= Beartooth =

Beartooth may refer to:

== Geography ==
- Absaroka-Beartooth Wilderness, in Montana and Wyoming, United States
- Beartooth Butte Formation, geologic formation in Wyoming
- Beartooth Glacier, located in the U.S. state of Montana
- Beartooth Mountain (British Columbia), in the Coast Mountains
- Beartooth Mountains, in south central Montana and northwest Wyoming, U.S
  - Beartooth Mountain, 3,766 m peak in the Beartooth Mountains
- Beartooth National Forest, established in Montana, United States

== Other ==
- Beartooth (band), American hardcore punk band from Columbus, Ohio
- Beartooth EP, album released by the Long Beach, California band, Boris Smile
- Beartooth Highway, the section of U.S. Highway 212 between Red Lodge and Cooke City, Montana
- Beartooth NBC or KTVH-DT, TV station serving Helena, Montana and the surrounding area

== See also ==
- Bears Tooth
