= Home, Like Noplace Is There =

Studio album by The Hotelier
- Released: February 25, 2014
- Genre: Indie rock; punk rock; emo; pop-punk
- Length: 36:15
- Label: Tiny Engines

The Hotelier chronology
It Never Goes Out (2011)	Home, Like Noplace Is There (2014)	Goodness (2016)

Home, Like Noplace Is There is the second studio album by American rock band The Hotelier. Released in 2014, the album received widespread critical acclaim and became recognized as one of the best emo revival albums of all time.

== Release ==
The band released their second album in 2014 titled Home, Like Noplace Is There, which brought the band to attention in the emo revival scene. After releasing the album, vocalist Christian Holden stated in a blog post on the band's Tumblr that "Our new album deals with some real dark stuff. So to all my brooding and slightly damaged friends, have your happy album or Rugrats in Paris nearby. It's partly about my experience with friends and loved ones in the past three years which were very complicated, toxic, and abusive. But laid within is a lot about the deconstruction of self for personal growth and transformation. I hope it helps you live and stuff. Apparently we are emo now."

In June, the group supported Modern Baseball on their headlining US tour. In July and August, the group went on a co-headlining US tour with Foxing. Prawn and Little Big League appeared on select dates. In October and November, the group supported The World Is a Beautiful Place & I Am No Longer Afraid to Die on their US tour. In August and September, the group supported The Get Up Kids on their headlining US tour. Following this, the group embarked on their own headlining US tour in October and November. They were supported by Runaway Brother, Oso Oso and The Spirit of the Beehive.

== Reception ==
Professional ratings
Aggregate scores
Source	Rating
Metacritic	91/100
Review scores
Source	Rating
AllMusic	4.5/5 stars
Alternative Press	4.5/5 stars
Now	4/5 stars
Pitchfork	8.2/10
Punknews.org	4.5/5 stars
Rock Sound	9/10
Sputnikmusic	4.6/5
Tom Hull	B+

Home, Like Noplace Is There received universal critical acclaim. At Metacritic, which assigns a normalized rating out of 100 to reviews from mainstream critics, the album received an average score of 91, indicating "universal acclaim".

In the review for AllMusic, Fred Thomas described the album as, "a beautiful blur of raw feelings and stark observations, supported by well-thought-out hooks and musicianship". Adam Thomas of Sputnikmusic stated that "Home, Like NoPlace Is There begs to be adapted to its listener's own fears and struggles, regardless of if it's grief, isolation, identity or even something a bit more abstract. It's a helping hand when you need it most – and that's the strongest compliment I could ever possibly give a record." Ian Cohen of Pitchfork declared that "This might be the sound of The Hotelier tearing the building down, but they're working towards something monumental."

=== Year-end lists ===
Home, Like Noplace Is There ranked at number two on Sputnikmusic's Staff's Top 50 of 2014 list. It was listed at number one on the AbsolutePunk staff's top 30 albums of 2014, and number six on the users' top 50 albums of 2000-2015. According to Marc Snitzer, writer for the Philadelphia City Paper, The Hotelier was named one of two bands "leading the emo revival". The band was ranked number seven on Alternative Press's list of the "12 Biggest Moments of The #EmoRevival in 2014" for releasing their sophomore album. Leor Galil, writer for the Chicago Reader named it his favorite record of 2014. The band was also featured (for their second album) in a Boston Globe article highlighting the best music from Boston in 2014. The album was included at number 29 on Rock Sound's "Top 50 Albums of the Year" list.

In 2017, Spin ranked Home, Like Noplace Is There at number one on their list of the 30 Best Emo Revival Albums, Ranked.

== Track listing ==
All music is composed by The Hotelier.

No.	Title	Length
1.	"An Introduction to the Album"	4:32
2.	"The Scope of All of This Rebuilding"	2:26
3.	"In Framing"	2:59
4.	"Your Deep Rest"	3:47
5.	"Among the Wildflowers"	5:48
6.	"Life in Drag"	2:21
7.	"Housebroken"	4:50
8.	"Discomfort Revisited"	3:59
9.	"Dendron"	5:27
Total length:		36:15

== Personnel ==
- Christian Holden – vocals, bass
- Chris Hoffman – guitar, vocals
- Ben Gauthier – guitar, vocals
- Sam Frederick – drums
