= Empire! Empire! (I Was a Lonely Estate) =

American emo band

Empire! Empire! (I Was A Lonely Estate)
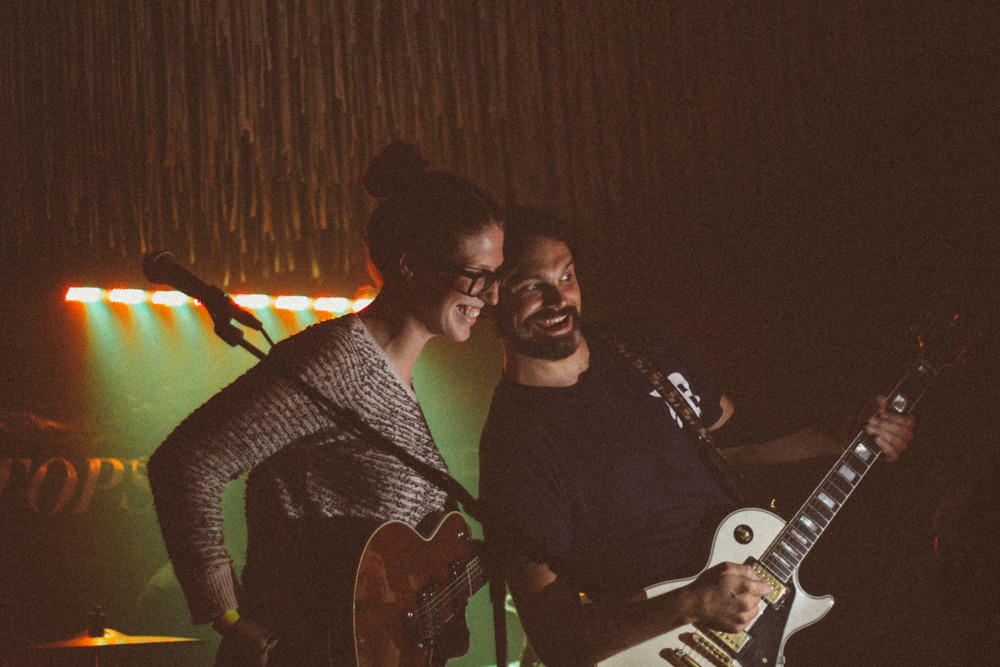
- Empire! Empire! (I Was a Lonely Estate) performing at the Topshelf Records CMJ show on October 24, 2014.

Background information
- Origin: Fenton, Michigan
- Genre: Emo
- Years active: 2006–2016 · 2025-present
- Labels: Count Your Lucky Stars, Topshelf
- Spinoff of: Anna Flyaway
- Past members: Keith Latinen; Cathy Latinen; Jon Steinhoff; Joseph Dane

Empire! Empire! (I Was a Lonely Estate) is an American emo band from Michigan. It was formed in 2006 originally as a solo project of band member Keith Latinen. The band's music is most often described as emotional indie rock reminiscent of 1990s emo bands such as Mineral and American Football. The band's first release was in 2007 with an EP titled When The Sea Became A Giant. The band released a full-length album, What It Takes To Move Forward, in 2009. The band is signed to Count Your Lucky Stars Records and has released albums on a number of other labels, such as strictly no capital letters (UK), Topshelf Records, Stiff Slack (Japan), and Hobbledehoy Record Co (Australia). The band released their second album You Will Eventually Be Forgotten on August 19, 2014. On February 16, 2016, the band announced their final tour before their breakup on their official Facebook page.

== History ==
=== 2006–2008: Early years ===
Empire! Empire! (I Was a Lonely Estate) was started as a solo project by Keith so that he "could get good enough to record" for his and Cathy's current project called Anna Flyaway. After they stopped making music under Anna Flyaway, they continued on with the new project.

In January 2007, Empire! Empire! self-released their first LP titled When The Sea Became A Giant on CD. Later, they would re-issue it on their label Count Your Lucky Stars Records.

=== 2009–2013: What It Takes To Move Forward ===
In September 2009, the band released their first studio album titled What It Takes To Move Forward on Count Your Lucky Stars Records. A few months later, a Japanese version would be released on Stiff Slack records which included alternate cover art and two bonus tracks.

Following their album release, the band went on a short US tour in 2010 with various supporting bands. Vulture.com listed "Keep What You Have Built Up Here" as number 87 of the 100 greatest emo songs.

Beginning in March 2012, the band went on a West Coast tour of the US with Warren Franklin, followed by a month-long tour of the United Kingdom in November with fellow Michigan band The Reptilian. The tour included stops in Ireland and Scotland.

In April 2013, Empire! Empire! returned to Europe for a tour supporting The World Is a Beautiful Place & I Am No Longer Afraid to Die.

=== 2014–2016: You Will Eventually Be Forgotten ===
Five years after the last full-length album was released, the band announced in June 2014 their next album You Will Eventually Be Forgotten would be released in August with an accompanying graphic novel, Ribbon. The first single from You Will Eventually Be Forgotten, entitled "If It's Bad News, It Can Wait", premiered on Stereogum on July 7.

In the summer of 2014, the band joined The Early November and Warren Franklin & the Founding Fathers on an all-acoustic US tour. According to Keith, this was their first such tour. The first song from the new album was released on July 22 entitled A Keepsake and premiered on NPR.

On August 13, 2014, Interview Magazine exclusively premiered the new album on their site, allowing users to stream the full album 6 days before the physical release. That fall, the band toured with Free Throw in support of the new album. The first chapter of the accompanying graphic novel Ribbon was posted on Wondering Sound and featured illustrations by Ben Sears with story by Keith. On the heels of this new album, the band released a split 7-inch record with Joie de Vivre in November, with a single premiering on stereogum a month prior to release.

Then, in late January 2015, a drunk man driving a pickup truck crashed into Keith and Cathy's house in rural Michigan. The driver slammed into Empire!'s parked van and lodged the truck in the front of their house. To help recoup the cost of a new used van, a GoFundMe page was created for donations. Despite this setback, the band followed through with their planned tour alongside Warren Franklin and The Founding Fathers which started just four days after the crash.

In May, Empire! Empire! toured the US with Dikembe, then went out with The Saddest Landscape in November on their record release tour. Later that year, the band posted two bonus tracks from You Will Eventually Be Forgotten that were included with the Japanese release on Stiff Slack records. The tracks were posted to the band's Bandcamp page. Then, in July 2016, they performed and recorded a 3-song set for Little Elephant which was available as a 12-inch record.

After making music for 10 years, the band announced on February 16, 2016, that they would be breaking up after going on one last tour with Warren Franklin & the Founding Fathers in April of the same year. The band played their final show On May 7, 2016, in Flint, MI at Flint Local 432. They had support from The Cardboard Swords, The Island of Misfit Toys, Mountains for Clouds, The Reptilian, Joie De Vivre, and Warren Franklin & the Founding Fathers.

On April 5, Empire! Empire! released a music video for "A Keepsake" off of their final album: a song which features vocals by Bob Nanna of Braid. It was released exclusively on music site Brooklyn Vegan and was the band's first-ever video.

=== 2025-present: Reunion ===
On March 4, it was announced that the band would reunite to play a one-off reunion show at the second annual iteration of the Best Friends Forever festival in Las Vegas in October. The band also reiterated their promise that they would properly reunite with new music and a proper tour should the Detroit Lions win the Super Bowl.

== Name ==
Latinen thought of the band's long name when it was still his solo project. He wanted a name that sounded "elaborate and artistic" but admits that if he would have known that the project would form into a full band he would have chosen something easier to remember.

Keith explains the name:

As for the meaning behind the name, I've had a lifetime of bands not working out, and so I chose a name to reflect my frustration. I tend to hide lyrics and names behind a lot of dense symbolism, so here's the general break-down of the name. "Empire! Empire!" is that one evasive dream that you want so badly, and you will always chase it, but it never seems quite in reach. The "(I Was a Lonely Estate)" portion was where I felt I was incomplete and insignificant. It's hard to get off the ground if you can't find reliable people to share your dream. The exclamation points mark how important the dream is, and the parenthesis signify that I feel like I am unimportant and unnoticed.

== Members ==
=== Final lineup ===
- Keith Latinen – vocals, guitar, bass, drums, trumpet, cello
- Cathy Latinen – guitar, vocals
- Jon Steinhoff – drums, vocals
- Joseph "Gooey" Dane – bass

=== Past members ===
- Drums – Jon Steinhoff, Ryan Stailey, Jon Murrell, Matt Brim
- Bass – DJ Degennaro, Ahmad Naboulsi, Rich Ayers, Danny Miller, Derek McNelly

Jon Murrell, Rich, Ahmad, or Danny have never written/recorded anything with the band.

== Discography ==
=== Studio albums ===
- What It Takes to Move Forward (2009)
- You Will Eventually Be Forgotten (2014)

=== EPs ===
- When the Sea Became a Giant EP (2007)
- Summer Tour EP '09 (2009)
- Home After Three Months Away 7-inch (2011)
- On Time Spent Waiting, or Placing the Weight of the World on the Shoulders of Those You Love the Most 7-inch (2011)
- In Which the Choices We Didn't Make Were Better Than the Ones That We Did (2013)

=== 7-inches ===
- Year of the Rabbit 7-inch (2008)
- SXSW Promo 7-inch (2011)
- Bramble Jam II Promo 7-inch (2012)

=== Splits ===
- Empire! Empire! (I Was a Lonely Estate) / Football, etc. Split (2009)
- Empire! Empire! (I Was a Lonely Estate) / Into It. Over It. Split (2010)
- Annabel/Empire! Empire! (I Was a Lonely Estate) / Joie De Vivre/The Reptilian 4-Way Split 7-inch (2011)
- Empire! Empire! (I Was a Lonely Estate)/ Mountains For Clouds/ Two Knights/ Driving On City Sidewalks 4-Way Split 7-inch (2012)
- Empire! Empire! (I Was a Lonely Estate)/ Arrows Split 7-inch (2012)
- Empire! Empire! (I Was a Lonely Estate)/ Rika Split 7-inch (2012)
- Empire! Empire! (I Was a Lonely Estate)/ Malegoat Split (2013)
- Empire! Empire! (I Was a Lonely Estate)/ Your Neighbour, the Liar/ The Smithsonian Split 7-inch (2013)
- Empire! Empire! (I Was a Lonely Estate)/Joie De Vivre Split 7-inch (2013)
- Empire! Empire! (I Was a Lonely Estate)/ Dikembe/ The Hotel Year/ Modern Baseball/ Old Gray/ Pentimento (2013)

=== Compilations ===
- Early Discography CS (2010)
- Middle Discography (2011)

== Reviews ==
- Collective Zine: What it Takes to Move Forward
- Sputnik Music: What it Takes to Move Forward
- Positivexposure: What it Takes to Move Forward
- Altsounds: Year of the Rabbit
- Decoy Music: Year of the Rabbit
- Music Emissions: When The Sea Became A Giant
- Absolute Punk: When The Sea Became A Giant
