= What It Takes to Move Forward =

Studio album by Empire! Empire! (I Was a Lonely Estate)
- Released: September 29, 2009
- Genre: Emo, indie rock
- Length: 55:39
- Label: Count Your Lucky Stars Records

Empire! Empire! (I Was a Lonely Estate) chronology
What It Takes to Move Forward (2009)	You Will Eventually Be Forgotten (2014)

What It Takes to Move Forward is the debut studio album by American emo band, Empire! Empire! (I Was a Lonely Estate), released in 2009 on Count Your Lucky Stars Records.

Vulture.com listed "Keep What You Have Built Up Here" as number 87 of the 100 greatest emo songs. Spin ranked the album number 13 out of the 30 best emo revival albums, writing that the album had "garnered a mythical cult status" after its release.

== Track listing ==
1. "How to Make Love Stay" – 4:24
2. "Keep What You Have Built Up Here" – 5:09
3. "What Safe Means" – 4:01
4. "It Happened Because You Left" – 8:09
5. "Rally the Troops! Poke Holes In Their Defenses! Line Our Coffers with Their Coffins!" – 4:23
6. "It's a Plague, and You're Invited" – 4:11
7. "Everything Is Connected and Everything Matters (A Temporary Solution to a Permanent Problem)" – 4:01
8. "The Next Step to Regaining Control" – 6:08
9. "With Your Greatest Fears Realized, You Will Not Be Comforted" – 3:07
10. "I Am a Snail, and You Are a Pace I Cannot Match" – 5:14
11. "An Idea Is a Greater Monument Than a Cathedral" – 6:52
