= It Never Goes Out =

Studio album by The Hotelier
- Released: January 2, 2011
- Recorded: 2010
- Genre: Indie rock; pop punk
- Length: 29:41
- Label: Tiny Engines

The Hotelier chronology
We Are All Alone (2009)	It Never Goes Out (2011)	Home, Like Noplace Is There (2014)

It Never Goes Out is the debut studio album by the American rock band The Hotelier. It was originally released on January 2, 2011, and later re-released in 2015 after the band was signed by the Carolina-based record label Tiny Engines.

== Style ==
The album's style has been described as "an auspicious album of anti-establishment pop-punk written by angsty high schoolers."

Professional ratings
Review scores
Source	Rating
Exclaim!	7/10 stars
Pitchfork	(7.7/10)

== Release ==
Following their founding in 2009, the group released a two-song demo and a short EP titled We Are All Alone under the name The Hotel Year. The releases didn't draw much attention outside of the band's home state of Massachusetts.

The debut full length was written when all of the band's members were in their late teens. It was recorded in 2010 and released on January 2, 2011. After the success of their second LP, titled Home, Like Noplace Is There, the record was re-released in early 2015 with a different album cover.

This is the band's only full-length with guitarist/vocalist Zack Shaw, who left the group in 2012. He was replaced by Cody Millett.

== Track listing ==
All music is composed by The Hotelier.

No.	Title	Length
1.	"Our Lives Would Make A Sad, Boring Movie"	3:05
2.	"Vacancy"	2:44
3.	"Lonely Hearts Club"	3:12
4.	"An Ode To The Nite Ratz Club"	3:53
5.	"Weathered"	4:13
6.	"I'm Gone"	3:02
7.	"Holiday"	1:05
8.	"Still-Water Spectacle"	3:55
9.	"Title Track (There Is A Light)"	4:32
Total length:		29:41

== Personnel ==
- Christian Holden – vocals, bass
- Zack Shaw – guitar, vocals
- Chris Hoffman – guitar
- Sam Frederick – drums
