= Born Without Bones =

American indie punk band

- Origin: Milford, Massachusetts, U.S.
- Genres: Indie punk, alternative rock, midwest emo
- Years active: 2010–present
- Label: Pure Noise Records
- Members: Scott Ayotte; Jonathan Brucato; Jim Creighton; Ryan McKenna
- Website: www.bornwithoutbones.com

Born Without Bones is an American indie punk band based in Milford, Massachusetts, currently signed with Pure Noise Records. The band was originally set up by lead vocalist Scott Ayotte as a solo project in 2009, but later grew into a band with the addition of guitarist Jonathan Brucato and bassist Jim Creighton. The group performed at the Boston Calling Music Festival in 2022. Their style and sound has been described as 'grungy alt-rock' and 'indie punk', "experimenting with punk, alt-rock, indie and everything in between."

== History ==
The project was initially started by The Hotelier ex-guitarist Scott Ayotte as a solo project in 2009. Eventually, guitarist Jonathan Brucato and bassist Jim Creighton would join the band, forming Born Without Bones. In 2010, they released their debut album Say Hello, which has been described as a predominantly pop-punk album. In 2013, the band released their second album, Baby, which was described as "Born Without Bones' most intimate album", and in 2017 their third album Young at the Bend. Much to frontman Ayotte's regret, the band did not gain much popularity and success in the beginning, with Ayotte even considering quitting. However, to the band's surprise, music streams started skyrocketing in 2021, which motivated the band to start working on their fourth album, Dancer, produced by Mike Sapone (Taking Back Sunday, Brand New) was released in 2022. On February 25, 2026, Ryan McKenna (Sorority Noise, Prawn) would join as bassist.

== Members ==
Scott Ayotte - Vocals/Guitar

Jonathan Brucato - Guitar

Jim Creighton - Bass

Ryan McKenna - Bass

Sam Checkoway - Drums

== Discography ==
- Say Hello (2010)
- Baby (2013)
- Young at the Bend (2017)
- Dancer (2022)
