= Frameworks (band) =

American post-hardcore band

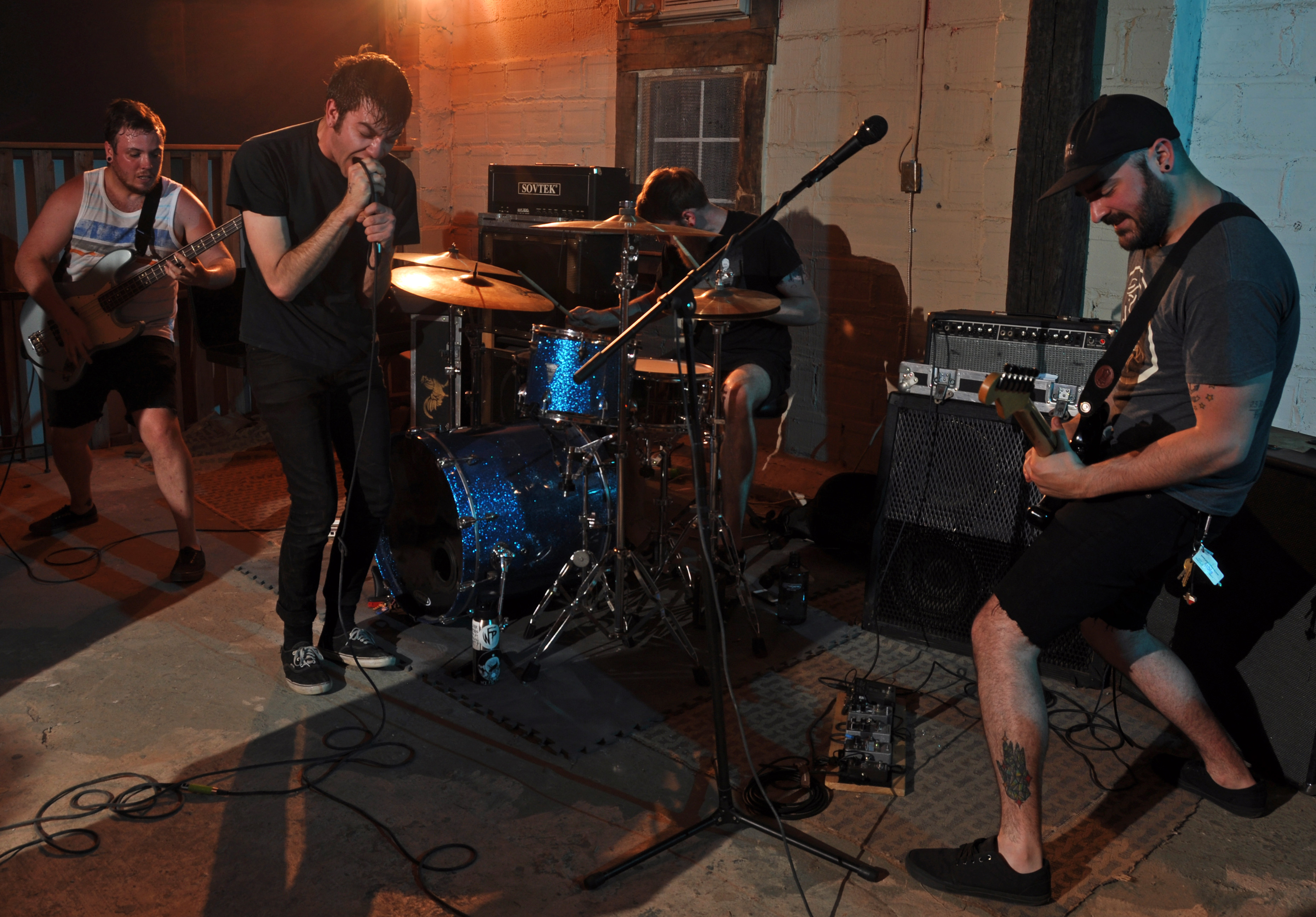
- Frameworks performing live in 2014 in Charlotte, North Carolina

Background information
- Origin: Gainesville, Florida, U.S.
- Genres: post-hardcore, melodic hardcore
- Years active: 2011–present
- Labels: Topshelf, Deathwish
- Members: Cory Fischer; Matthew Horner; Wyatt Rajer; Bobby Heilman; Luke Pate
- Past members: Taylor Agliata; Ryan McDonald; Andy Nicholl
- Website: frameworksband.com

Frameworks are an American post-hardcore band from Gainesville, Florida that formed in 2011. The band released its debut album, Loom, thorough Topshelf Records in 2014 before signing to Deathwish Inc. for its second studio album, Smother, released on July 8, 2016.

== History ==
Guitarist Cory Fischer invited vocalist Luke Pate to join his Gainesville, Florida metal band a week before they were set to record their debut EP after their previous vocalist quit. This metal band would eventually evolve into the screamo/post-hardcore band Frameworks in 2011. Recalling joining the metal band and starting his career as a screaming vocalist, Pate said: "I didn't have the slightest clue about what to do or how to do it, but I said yes for some reason [...] I just kind of fell into it, and that's how it started." Early EPs from Frameworks include the self-released Every Day Is the Same (2011) and Small Victories (2013) released through 13th Floor Records.

These early releases caught the attention of the indie label Topshelf Records, who announced they signed Frameworks in November 2013. On signing to and working with Topshelf, Pate said: "I'd say it's been the best case scenario. I've always really respected those guys and the bands they work with. We've meshed really well." Through the label, the band released its debut studio album Loom on April 29, 2014, which was met with generally favorable reviews from music critics. Loom was produced by Jack Shirley (Deafheaven, Loma Prieta) who was chosen to help create a "raw, but bright-sounding album and [Frameworks felt] that Shirley refined that vision." To support the album, Frameworks released a music video for the title track "Loom", embarked on an April-May 2014 tour with Gates and an August 2014 tour with United Nations. They closed out 2014 with a split EP between the Saddest Landscape featuring a Frameworks cover of the White Stripes' "Fell in Love with a Girl". All proceeds for the EP went to charity and both bands toured Europe together in support of its release in October 2014.

In February 2016, Frameworks released an EP titled Time Spent through Topshelf Records. The same month, the band announced they had signed to Jacob Bannon of Converge's indie label Deathwish Inc. and planned on releasing their second studio album later that year. Their second studio album, titled Smother, was released on July 8, 2016, though Deathwish.

== Members ==
- Cory Fischer – guitar
- Matthew Horner – drums, percussion
- Wyatt Rajer – bassman
- Luke Pate – vocals
- Bobby Heilman - guitar

== Discography ==
=== Studio albums ===
- Loom (2014, Topshelf)
- Smother (2016, Deathwish)

=== EPs ===
- Every Day Is the Same (2011, self-released)
- Small Victories (2013, 13th Floor)
- Time Spent (2016, Topshelf)

=== Splits ===
- Droughts / Frameworks / Kittyhawk / Prawn (split with Droughts, Kittyhawk and Prawn) (2014, Fair Weather)
- Frameworks / The Saddest Landscape (split with the Saddest Landscape) (2014, Soft Speak)

=== Music videos ===
- "Preamble" (2013)
- "Loom" (2014)
- "Purge" (2016)
