= Sinai Vessel =

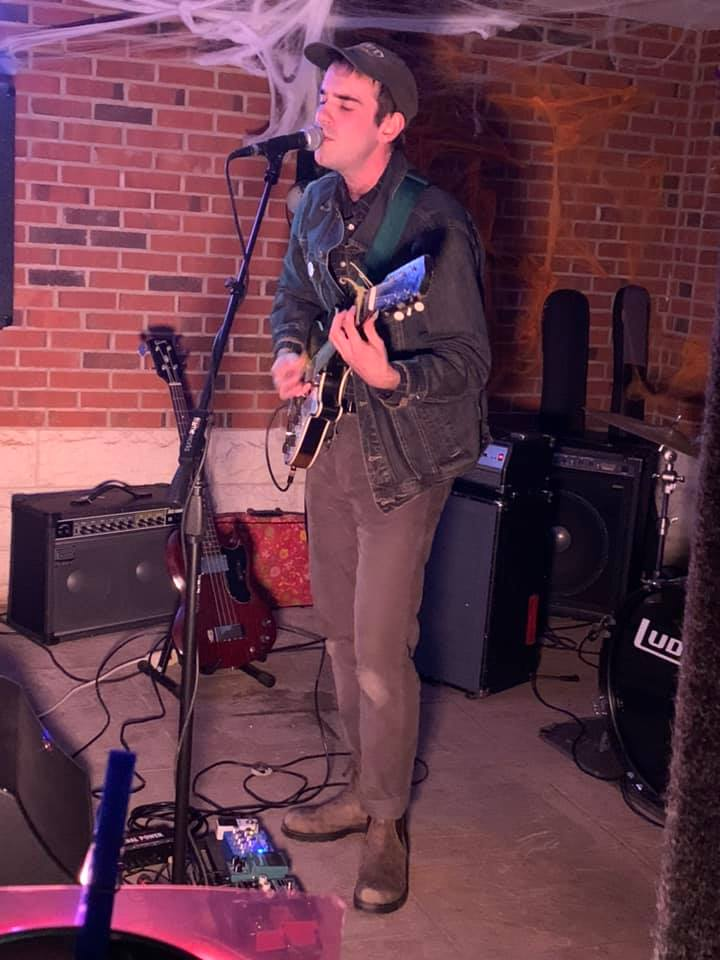

Background information
- Origin: North Carolina
- Genres: Emo, indie rock
- Years active: 2011-2024
- Labels: Tiny Engines
- Members: Caleb Cordes
- Website: sinaivessel.us

Sinai Vessel is the stage name of American indie rock musician Caleb Cordes from North Carolina. The project was originally a trio, but now consists just of Cordes.

== History ==
Sinai Vessel began as the solo project of musician Caleb Cordes. Since then, it had expanded into a three-piece band, but is now back to a solo project. In 2011, Sinai Vessel released their first album titled Labor Pains. They followed that release in 2013 with an EP titled Profanity. In 2015, Count Your Lucky Stars Records released a split with the bands Dowsing, Sinai Vessel, Long Knives, and The Cardboard Swords. On January 27, 2017, Sinai Vessel released their second full-length album after signing to Tiny Engines titled Brokenlegged. In 2020, Cordes released his third album as Sinai Vessel titled Ground Aswim.

== Band members ==
Current

- Caleb Cordes (vocals, guitars)

Former

- Daniel Hernandez (bass)
- Joshua Herron (drums)

== Discography ==
Studio albums

- Labor Pains (2011, self-released)
- Brokenlegged (2017, Tiny Engines)
- Ground Aswim (2020, self-released)
- I SING (2024, self-released)

EPs

- Profanity (2013, Flannel Gurl Records)

Splits

- Dowsing, Sinai Vessel, The Cardboard Swords, Long Knives - Dowsing, Sinai Vessel, The Cardboard Swords, Long Knives (2015, Count Your Lucky Stars)
