= Strange Relations =

Strange Relations may refer to:

- Strange Relations (band), an American rock band
- "Strange Relations" (Babylon 5), a 1998 TV episode
- "Strange Relations" (Power Rangers Dino Thunder), a 2004 TV episode
- Strange Relations, a 1960 collection of short stories by Philip José Farmer
- Strange Relations, or My Beautiful Son, a 2001 TV film starring Paul Reiser
