= Goodness (The Hotelier album) =

Studio album by The Hotelier
- Released: May 27, 2016
- Recorded: August–September, 2015
- Genre: Indie rock; emo
- Length: 47:19
- Label: Tiny Engines
- Producer: Seth Manchester

The Hotelier chronology
| Home, Like Noplace Is There (2014) | Goodness (2016) |

Singles from Goodness
- 1. "Piano Player" Released: March 21, 2016; 2. "Soft Animal" Released: April 22, 2016

Alternate cover
- censored album art used on digital retailers

Goodness is the third studio album by American indie rock band The Hotelier. After being announced in February 2016, it was released in May through independent label Tiny Engines.

== Artwork ==
The artwork was done by Brooklyn-based artist Xirin. It features a group of elderly people fully nude standing in a field. A censored version used for online retailers was noticeable for its extreme censoring, with the artists stating they took an "all or nothing" approach, saying "Instead of making a version of the image that was digestible or easy on the eyes, we just chose to obscure the photo entirely, to convey that we’re sorry you can’t see it... rather than compromise the image and the meaning behind it."

== Critical reception ==
Professional ratings
Aggregate scores
| Source | Rating |
|---|---|
| AnyDecentMusic? | 7.8/10 |
| Metacritic | 85/100 |
Review scores
| Source | Rating |
| AllMusic | 4/5 stars |
| The A.V. Club | A |
| Consequence of Sound | B+ |
| DIY | 3/5 stars |
| Exclaim! | 9/10 |
| The Line of Best Fit | 8/10 |
| Pitchfork | 8.0/10 |
| Rolling Stone | 3.5/5 stars |
| Spectrum Culture | 4/5 stars |
| Spin | 9/10 |

Goodness received mostly positive reviews from music critics. At Metacritic, which assigns a weighted mean rating out of 100 to reviews from mainstream critics, the album received an average score of 85, based on 10 reviews, which indicates "universal acclaim". Writing for Exclaim!, Conor Mackie gave the album an extremely positive review, hailing it as "their most mature, most complete record to date."

=== Accolades ===
| Publication | Accolade | Year | Rank | Ref. |
|---|---|---|---|---|
| The A.V. Club | The A.V. Club's Top 50 Albums of 2016 | 2016 | 5 | |
| Billboard | Billboard's 50 Best Albums of 2016 | 2016 | 37 | |
| Consequence of Sound | Top 50 Albums of 2016 | 2016 | 43 | |
| Pitchfork | The 20 Best Rock Albums of 2016 | 2016 | —N/a | |
| Pitchfork | Readers' Top 50 Albums of 2016 | 2016 | 49 | |
| Stereogum | The 50 Best Albums of 2016 | 2016 | 39 | |

== Track listing ==
| No. | Title | Length |
|---|---|---|
| 1. | "N 43° 59' 38.927" W 71° 23' 45.27"" | 0:48 |
| 2. | "Goodness Pt. 2" | 4:03 |
| 3. | "Piano Player" | 5:35 |
| 4. | "N 43° 33' 55.676" W 72° 45' 11.914"" | 1:33 |
| 5. | "Two Deliverances" | 3:58 |
| 6. | "Settle the Scar" | 4:18 |
| 7. | "Opening Mail for My Grandmother" | 3:24 |
| 8. | "N 42° 6' 3.001" W 71° 55' 3.295"" | 1:17 |
| 9. | "Soft Animal" | 4:04 |
| 10. | "Sun" | 6:42 |
| 11. | "You in This Light" | 3:39 |
| 12. | "Fear of Good" | 1:42 |
| 13. | "End of Reel" | 6:16 |
| Total length: | | 47:20 |

== Personnel ==
- Christian Holden – bass, vocals, piano, guitar
- Chris Hoffman – guitar, vocals
- Ben Gauthier – guitar, percussion
- Sam Frederick – percussion
