= Rockets EP =

EP by Boris Smile
- Released: 2010
- Genre: Indie rock, folk, orchestral
- Length: 31:17
- Label: Count Your Lucky Stars Records

Professional ratings
Review scores
Source	Rating
Rockfreaks.net	link
Thepunksite.com	link
Thealbumproject.net	link

Rockets EP is an album released by the Long Beach, California band, Boris Smile. The album was released by Count Your Lucky Stars Records in 2010.

== Track listing ==
All songs written by A. Wesley Chung and Boris Smile, except "Satellites" and "Life for Science" written by Seth Shafer.

1. "Satellites" – 3:00
2. "Adventures with Rockets (Revisited)" – 4:52
3. "Apollo" – 3:36
4. "Aurora" – 5:15
5. "Are We Alone?" – 2:12
6. "8.24.06 (The Humbling of a Planet)" – 12:20
- Bonus: "Apollo (Acoustic Version)"
- Bonus: "Life for Science"

== Personnel ==
- A. Wesley Chung: vocals, acoustic guitar, bass drum
- Abigail Davidson: vocals, clarinet
- Andrew Chen: violin
- Ashley Bradford: harmonica
- Avi Buffalo: electric guitar, vocals
- Beth Balmer: accordion
- David Goyette: trombone
- Doug Brown: bass, vocals
- Evan Trine: drums
- Jessica Garcia: cello
- Meagan Christy: trumpet
- Seth Shafer: piano, tuba, keyboards
- Steven Carlson: acoustic guitar
