= You Will Eventually Be Forgotten =

Studio album by Empire! Empire! (I Was a Lonely Estate)
- Released: August 19, 2014
- Genre: Emo, indie rock, post-rock
- Length: 37:42
- Label: Count Your Lucky Stars Records

Empire! Empire! (I Was a Lonely Estate) chronology
What It Takes To Move Forward (2009)	You Will Eventually Be Forgotten (2014)

You Will Eventually Be Forgotten is the second and final studio album by American emo band Empire! Empire! (I Was a Lonely Estate), released on August 19, 2014, on Count Your Lucky Stars Records and Topshelf Records. Pre-orders began on July 22, 2014, through the Count Your Lucky Stars store and the Topshelf Records store. The band has made "A Keepsake" and "If It's Bad News, It Can Wait" available for streaming ahead of the release date. Mineral's Chris Simpson and Braid's Bob Nanna have made guest appearances on the LP.

== Track listing ==
1. "Ribbon" – 2:04
2. "I Was Somewhere Cold, Dark... and Lonely" – 3:33
3. "We Are People Here. We Are Not Numbers" – 2:47
4. "A Keepsake" – 3:47
5. "You Have to Be So Much Better than You Ever Thought" – 4:58
6. "Stay Divided" – 3:10
7. "Foxfire" – 2:16
8. "Things Not Worth Fixing" – 4:25
9. "If It's Bad News, It Can Wait" – 3:17
10. "It's So Much Darker When a Light Goes Out than It Would Have Been If It Had Never Shone" – 4:37
11. "The Promise That Life Can Go on No Matter How Bad Our Losses" – 2:48
