= It Looks Sad. =

American band

- Also known as: It Looks Sad, That's Why I Said It's You, Our Years
- Origin: Charlotte, North Carolina
- Genres: shoegaze; indie rock; post-punk; electronic
- Years active: 2012-present
- Labels: Currently Unsigned ex Tiny Engines
- Members: Jimmy Turner; Will Schoonmaker; Vince D'Ambrosio; Ryan Halberg
- Past members: Brett Green; Josh Wilson; Lamont Brown; Garrett Herzfeld; Aimee Jenschke; Alex Ruiz; Leith Ali; Ben Bradford; Adam Cope - dead eye shot / animaux demos
- Website: https://itlookssad.bandcamp.com/

It Looks Sad. is an American emo band from Charlotte, North Carolina. The band has released two EPs and a full length LP. Their first self-titled EP was released in 2014. In 2015, the band released two new songs, "Creature" and "Nagoya" both part of their 2015 digital single, Kaiju. Sky Lake, the band's first studio album, was released in 2018. In March 2020, It Looks Sad. put out a four-track EP, Songs for Quarantine.

== History ==
=== Formation: 2012 ===
It Looks Sad. was originally formed as "It Looks Sad, That's Why I Said It's You", by Brett Green, Jimmy Turner, Lamont Brown, and Vince D’Ambrosio in early 2012. They released their first EP Welcome to Good Woods in May 2012 and their second EP Daughters Cottage in October 2012.

=== Self-Titled and Kaiju: 2013-2015 ===
In late 2013, the band emerged under the new and shortened name, "It Looks Sad." and also signing with local label Tiny Engines. Seasons was the first single they released under their new shortened name and in August 2014 they released their third EP with Tiny Engines called It Looks Sad. They continued touring into 2015 with them announcing they are working on new material. In June 2015 they released their digital single Kaiju with the songs "Creature" and "Nagoya" and went on another East Coast tour.

=== Lost Songs and Sky Lake: 2017-2018 ===
In late 2017 they released Lost Songs, it was released in order to help pay for one of the band members car, which broke down. On Twitter It Looks Sad. stated that it would cost $750 to repair his car and that he would release demos of unused songs or make new ones in-order to help pay for the repair costs.

In 2018 the first single "Light" from It Looks Sad's debut album Sky Lake was released on the Tiny Engines YouTube channel followed by the singles "Drool", "Bike" and "Visor". Sky Lake was released November 2018.

== Discography ==
Studio albums

- Sky Lake (2018, Tiny Engines)

EPs

- Welcome to Good Woods (2012)
- Daughters Cottage (2012)
- Kaiju (2015, Tiny Engines)
- Lost Songs (2017)
- Songs for Quarantine (2020)

Singles

- It Looks Sad. (2014, Tiny Engines)
- Light (2018)
- Bike (2018)
- Faded (2018)
- Visor (2018)
- Car (2020)
