= Empty Country =

Stage name of musician Joseph D'Agostino

Empty Country is the stage name of Cymbals Eat Guitars member Joseph D'Agostino.

== History ==
D'Agostino formed Cymbals Eat Guitars in 2007, where he was the vocalist and guitarist until 2017. After the breakup of Cymbals Eat Guitars, D'Agostino formed a solo project called Empty Country.

In 2020, D'Agostino released his first solo album under the Empty Country name. The album was originally set to be released in 2019, but was postponed due to the issues with the label D'Agostino was signed to at the time, Tiny Engines.

In 2023, D'Agostino released his second solo album under the Empty Country name, titled Empty Country II.
