= Why There Are Mountains =

Studio album by Cymbals Eat Guitars
- Released: January 20, 2009
- Genre: Indie rock
- Length: 44:42
- Label: Self-released (original issue); Sister's Den Records; Memphis Industries
- Producer: Kyle "Slick" Johnson

Cymbals Eat Guitars chronology
Why There Are Mountains (2009)	Lenses Alien (2011)

Alternative cover

Why There Are Mountains is an independently released studio album by the indie rock band Cymbals Eat Guitars. The album was initially self-released, then re-released after the band signed to Sister's Den Records in late 2009. The LP version of the album is currently only available via Insound.

== Track listing ==
All tracks are written by Joseph D'Agostino

No.	Title	Length
1.	"...And the Hazy Sea"	6:13
2.	"Some Trees (Merritt Moon)"	2:27
3.	"Indiana"	3:34
4.	"Cold Spring"	5:48
5.	"Share"	7:03
6.	"What Dogs See"	4:15
7.	"Wind Phoenix (Proper Name)"	5:16
8.	"Living North"	2:31
9.	"Like Blood Does"	7:33

== Personnel ==
The following people contributed to Why There Are Mountains

=== Cymbals Eat Guitars ===
- Daniel Baer – keyboards, piano
- Neil Berenholz – Bass
- Joseph D'agostino – guitar, vocals, composer
- Matthew Miller – drums, percussion

=== Recording personnel ===
- Kyle "Slick" Johnson – engineer, mixing, percussion, producer
- Dave McNair – mastering

=== Additional personnel ===
- Elizabeth Dotson-Westphalen – trombone
- Matt Gasiorowski – trumpet
- Marika Hughes – cello
- Megan Weeder – violin
- Lizzy Yoder – vocals

== Reception ==
Professional ratings
Review scores
Source	Rating
AllMusic	link
The A.V. Club	(B+) link
MusicOMH	link
NME	link
Pitchfork Media	(8.3/10) link
sputnikmusic	link

Why There Are Mountains received mostly positive reviews from critics. The album currently has a 78 out of 100 rating on the review aggregate site Metacritic, which indicates "generally favorable reviews".

Ian Cohen of Pitchfork Media gave the album an 8.3/10, writing "Why There Are Mountains ends up being like any great result of wanderlust—here, the journey is the end not the means; fortunately, that gives Why There Are Mountains astounding replay value." The album also received a "Best New Music" designation in the review.

The album has appeared on a few end-of-year albums lists. Pitchfork Media named Why There Are Mountains the 43rd best album of 2009. It was also named the number one album of the year on The Daily Cardinal's list of the Top 15 Albums of 2009.
