= Dowsing (band) =

American indie rock band

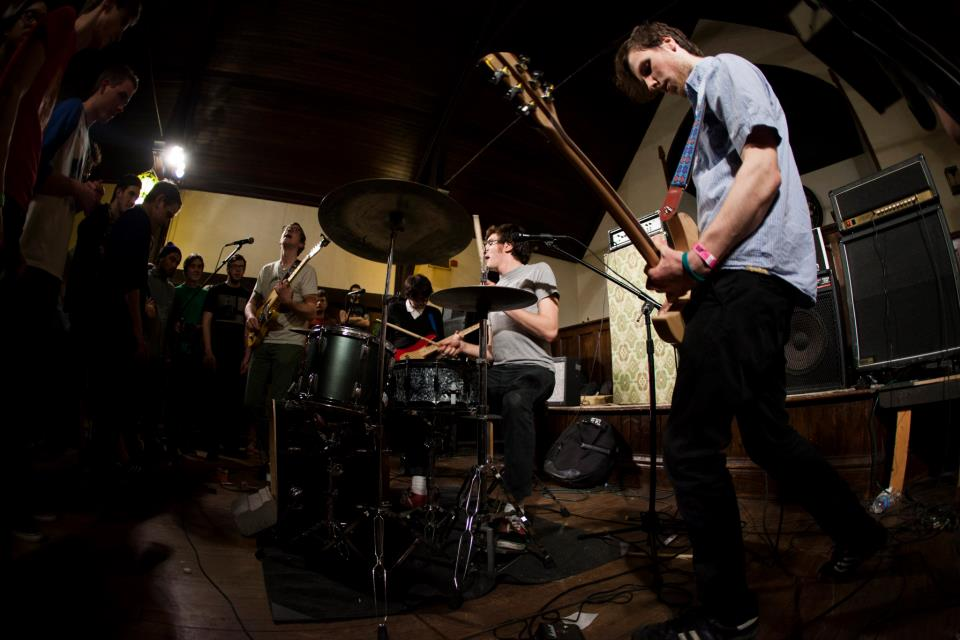
- Dowsing live in Champaign, IL

Background information
- Origin: Chicago, Illinois
- Genres: Emo; indie rock; pop punk
- Years active: 2011–present
- Labels: Count Your Lucky Stars; Asian Man
- Members: Erik Hunter Czaja; Michael Crotty; Michael Politowicz
- Website: dowsing.bandcamp.com

Dowsing is an American emo band from Chicago.

== History ==
Dowsing began in 2011 with the release of an EP titled All I Could Find Was You. They followed that release with a 7-inch split with Parker via Count Your Lucky Stars.

In 2012, Dowsing released their first studio album titled It's Still Pretty Terrible via Count Your Lucky Stars. The following year they released their second studio album titled I Don't Even Care Anymore. The album was recording at Atlas Studios at the Stayahead House from February 2, 2013 to February 10, 2013. Count Your Lucky Stars released a music video for the title track.

In 2013, Soft Speak Records released a split with Dowsing, Haverford, Run, Forever, and Captain, We're Sinking.

In May 2014, Dowsing released a 7-inch split with Annabel via Count Your Lucky Stars.

In July 2015, Count Your Lucky Stars Records released a 7-inch split with The Cardboard Swords, Dowsing, Long Knives, and Sinai Vessel.

On April 29, 2016, Dowsing released their third studio album entitled Okay via Asian Man Records.

In 2016, Dowsing featured a demo version of "Feeling Better" on "Forever Beautiful, A compilation of love for Orlando" after the Pulse nightclub shooting.

== Musical style and influences ==
Dowsing's sound has been described as "emotionally charged indie punk". The band's debut EP All I Could Find Was You has been described as "emo-infused indie rock". Hence, they have categorized as "emo-punk" and midwest emo. Alternative Press designated the band's early releases as "Mineral worship". Additionally, Dowsing are considered an emo revival band.

Frontperson Erik Czaja's vocal delivery has been characterized as "lax," and the band's overall style is described as "melancholy galore". According to a staff member at Punknews.org, "Dowsing are one of those bands who cut deep. There's a lot of tragedy, sorrow and heartache involved when they churn out their '90s-influenced emo. [...] When they do what they do, it's crisp, melodic and in tune with what the world needs - waves of honesty and conjectures of truth, told tenfold." The site also noted that Czaja and former bassist Gooey Fame "usually take the listener for a downward spiral of a trip, story-wise."

The tracks on I Don't Even Care Anymore have been described as "rife with emotion." Lyrical themes explored include romantic love, emotional pain, procrastination, and solace. The drumming has been characterized as "raw, cracking and coarse," and the production is described as "unpolished." Some tracks on the album contain elements of pop-punk. Additionally, the album's instrumentation occasionally incorporates organs.

== Band members ==
Current

- Erik Hunter Czaja - vocals, guitar
- Michael "Mikey" Crotty - guitar, vocals
- Michael "Mike P" Politowicz - bass, vocals
- Ian Paine-Jesam - drums, vocals
- Sean Neumann - band manager

Former

- Will Lange - drums
- Marcus Nuccio - drums
- Delia Hornik - keyboards
- Joeseph "Gooey Fame" Dane - bass
- Chris “The Wedge” French - guitar

== Discography ==
Studio albums

- It's Still Pretty Terrible (2012, Count Your Lucky Stars)
- I Don't Even Care Anymore (2013, Count Your Lucky Stars)
- Okay (2016, Asian Man)
- Sky Coffin (2019, Asian Man)
- No One Said This Would Be Easy (2023, Asian Man)

EPs and splits

- All I Could Find Was You (2011, Count Your Lucky Stars)
- Dowsing / Parker (2012, Count Your Lucky Stars)
- Dowsing / Haverford / Run Forever* / Captain, We're Sinking - Stay Sweet Split (2013, Soft Speak)
- Annabel / Dowsing (2014, Count Your Lucky Stars)
- Dowsing / The Cardboard Swords / Long Knives / Sinai Vessel - Dowsing / The Cardboard Swords / Long Knives / Sinai Vessel (2015, Count Your Lucky Stars)
