= Have Mercy (band) =

Rock band from Baltimore, Maryland, US

- Genres: Indie rock; emo; alternative rock; pop punk; post-hardcore
- Years active: 2009–2020, 2022–present
- Labels: Topshelf; Hopeless; Rude Records
- Members: Andrew Johnson; Brian Swindle; Nick Woolford; Steve Wootteon
- Past members: Joey(Cole) McCusker; Aaron Alt; Nate Gleason; Chris Speights; Luke Smartnick; Ryan Harris; Todd Wallace

Have Mercy is an American rock band from Baltimore, Maryland, currently signed to Rude Records.

== History ==
Have Mercy began in late 2009 after drummer Aaron Alt and guitarist Joey McCusker decided to disembark from their previous band. Looking for something different, following their formative years in the metal scene, they contacted long time friend Brian Swindle to head the group. Since then, they have released three albums, two EPs, and two splits. Their debut album, titled The Earth Pushed Back, was released in 2013 via Topshelf Records. Their second album, titled A Place of Our Own, was released in 2014 via Hopeless Records. They released their third album Make the Best of It on Hopeless Records on April 21, 2017.

On March 12, 2019, lead singer Brian Swindle announced that founding member and former drummer Aaron Alt had died. On December 18, 2019, the band announced their last tour via their social media accounts. Before the tour’s end, however, many of its dates had to be postponed due to COVID-19. As the pandemic continued, the band found it difficult to schedule what would have been their final shows.

On January 2, 2022, the band teased a new EP via Instagram with a studio photo featuring frontman Brian Swindle former members Andrew Johnson, Todd Wallace, and Nick Woolford. On August 26, 2022, Have Mercy released a self-titled EP containing seven new songs.

In August 2023, from the 10th to the 13th, they played four shows across four states as a reunion and 10 year celebration of their first album. That December, the band released their fifth album, NUMB, via Rude Records.

== Style ==
Have Mercy are described by AllMusic as an indie rock band that combines "warm, melancholic alt-rock with heavy emo and post-hardcore elements".

== Band members ==
Current Members

- Brian Swindle – lead vocals, guitar, keyboards (2009–2020, 2022–present)
- Andrew Johnson – guitar, backing vocals (2011–2017, 2022–present)
- Nick Woolford – bass guitar, backing vocals (2011–2017, 2019–2020, 2022–present)
- Steve Wootteon – drums (2023–present)

Former members

- Joey McCusker – lead guitar (2009–2013)
- Aaron Alt – drums, percussion (2009–2014; died 2019)
- Nate Gleason – guitar (2016–2019)
- Todd Wallace – drums (2014–2017, 2022–2023)

== Discography ==
Studio albums

- The Earth Pushed Back (2013)
- A Place of Our Own (2014)
- Make The Best of It (2017)
- The Love Life (2019)
- Numb (2023)
- the loneliest place i've ever been (2025)

EPs

- Land of the Pleasant Living (2011)
- My Oldest Friend (2012)
- Have Mercy (2022)

Splits

- You Blew It!, Dikembe, Have Mercy, Kittyhawk (2014)
- Daisyhead, Have Mercy (2014)
- Have Mercy, Somos (2015)

== Videography ==
- "Howl" (2014) Directed by Mike Henneberger and Bowie Alexander
- "The Place You Love" (Live) (2015) Directed by Taylor Rambo
- "Two Years" (2015) Directed by Ryan Berger and Jesse Cornaglia
- "Coexist" (2017) Directed by Erik Rojas
- "Good Christian Man" (2017) Directed by Roland Bingaman
- "Reaper" (2017) Directed by Danielle Elise Bartley
- "Mattress On The Floor" (2019) Directed by Corrine McBreen
- "Heartbeat" (2019)
- "Dressed Down" (2019) Directed by Dan Schepleng
- "Alive" (2023) Directed by Rick Barnwell
