= Merchant Ships =

American Midwest emo band

- Origin: South Bend, Indiana and Sturgis, Michigan
- Genres: Midwest emo; screamo; post-hardcore
- Years active: 2008–2009, 2010
- Spinoffs: Midwest Pen Pals; William Bonney
- Past members: Jack Senff; Nick Stutsman; Michael Gerstein; Dwayne Robinson

Merchant Ships was an American midwest emo and Screamo band from South Bend, Indiana.

== History ==
Merchant Ships was formed in 2008 by singer Jack Senff and drummer Dwayne Robinson after both being inspired by local bands performances. Nick Stutsman and Michael Gerstein were recruited as the guitarist and bassist, respectively. Their first demo titled LOL Cats demo was released in July 2008. Their first proper release was an EP titled I Want To Forget About Everything Bad That Ever Happened, Ever via Antietam Records. They later released their single "Old Grey" featured on the Simple Days Comp. in January 2009.

In May 2009, Merchant Ships parted ways for the first time. In the summer of the same year, Senff and Stutsman formed Midwest Pen Pals alongside Garrett Cabello and Mike Kenway and self-released their only official EP Inside Jokes. They ultimately broke up in September, 2009. In 2010, Merchant Ships reunited and released their single "Better Days Ahead" featuring "Sentinel" and "Good Weekend". They later signed with Count Your Lucky Stars Records and released their second EP (first on the label) titled For Cameron in July 2010.

In July 2010, Merchant Ships broke up for good, releasing their full discography for free via their Myspace page along with a compilation entitled "Shipsography". The band was featured in Funeral Sounds article titled "Five Emo One-Release Wonders". Jack Senff went on to play in William Bonney with Gerstein, Kenway, Josh Miller, and Ethan Coad. After William Bonney, Jack started North Folk, Sailor Heart, Boy Rex and Knola, and began to release acoustic folk music under his full name, "Jack M. Senff" on Skeletal Lightning Records. Michael joined East Lansing based band Lucy. Nick Stutsman went on to form emo band Park Jefferson, as well as the band Jingwei while Dwayne Robinson joined the Bloomington-based bands Hive Mind and House Olympics.

The band had planned a reunion show in late 2016 alongside longtime friends Sleep Patterns, but dropped the show shortly after.

== Band members ==
- Jack Senff – vocals (2008–2009, 2010)
- Nick Stutsman – guitar (2008–2009, 2010)
- Michael Gerstein – bass (2008–2009, 2010)
- Dwayne Robinson – drums (2008–2009, 2010)

== Discography ==
=== EPs ===
- LOL Cats Demo (2008, self-released)
- I Want To Forget About Everything That Ever Happened, Ever (2008, self-released)
- Bummer Times Demo (2009, self-released)
- For Cameron (2010, self-released)

=== Compilations ===
- Shipsography (2010, self-released)
- Merchant Ships a.k.a I Want To Remember (2025, self-released)
