= Kittyhawk (band) =

American emo band

- Genres: Emo, Midwest emo, indie pop, pop-punk
- Years active: 2011–2016, 2019–present
- Labels: Count Your Lucky Stars, Skeletal Lightning
- Members: Kate Grube; Mark Jaeschke; Erik Czaja; Evan Loritsch
- Website: www.facebook.com/kittyhawkchicago

Kittyhawk is an American emo band from Chicago, Illinois. The band has currently released two full-length albums, one extended play, and four splits. The band broke up in 2016, but announced their reunion in October 2019.

== History ==
Kittyhawk began in 2011. The following year it released its debut self-titled EP via Skeletal Lightning, and Storm Chaser Records, a record label owned by Evan Weiss (Into It. Over It.).

In 2013, the band released a 7" split EP with Cherry Cola Champions via Flannel Gurl Records.

In early 2014, the band released a split with Prawn, Droughts, and Frameworks. Later in 2014, the band was featured on a four way split from The Fest titled Sundae Bloody Sundae with The World Is a Beautiful Place & I Am No Longer Afraid to Die, Two Knights and Rozwell Kid via Skeletal Lightning.

In October 2014, Kittyhawk released their debut full-length album titled Hello, Again via Count Your Lucky Stars.

In late 2014, the band was featured on a split by Soft Speak Records with You Blew It!, Dikembe, and Have Mercy.

== Band members ==
- Kate Grube – vocals, keyboard
- Mark Jaeschke – guitar, vocals
- Erik Czaja – guitar, vocals
- Clare Teeling – bass, vocals
- Evan Loritsch – drums, vocals

== Discography ==
=== Albums ===
- Hello, Again (2014)
- Mikey's Favorite Songs (2021)

=== EPs ===
- Kittyhawk (2012)
