= Peaer =

American indie rock band

peaer
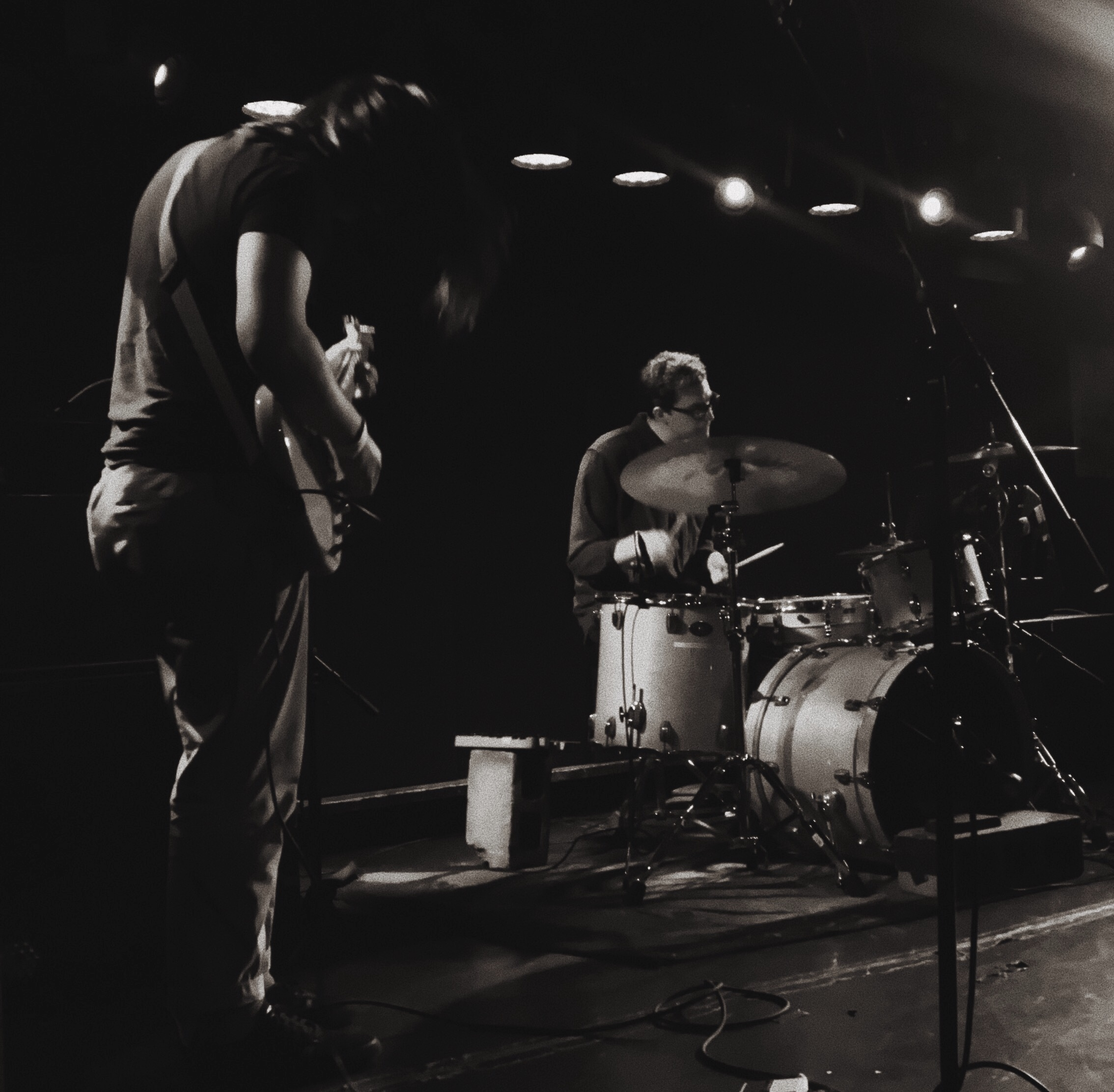

Background information
- Origin: Brooklyn, New York, U.S.
- Genres: Slowcore, math rock, indie rock
- Years active: 2014–present
- Labels: Tiny Engines
- Members: Peter Katz; Thom Lombardi; Jeremy Kinney

Peaer (stylised as peaer) is an American indie rock band from Brooklyn, New York. Beginning as the project of guitarist and vocalist Peter Katz, Peaer currently consists of Katz, Thom Lombardi and Jeremy Kinney. Peaer has released three full-length albums and was most recently signed to Tiny Engines. Their first album, released in 2014, is titled the eyes sink into the skull. In 2016, Peaer released their self-titled second album. In 2019, Peaer released their third full-length album titled A Healthy Earth. In 2020, they contributed to the benefit compilation The Song is Coming from Inside the House, organized by Strange Ranger in light of the COVID-19 pandemic.
