= Beartooth Glacier =

Glacier in Montana, United States

- Location within Montana
- Type: Mountain glacier
- Location: Beartooth Mountains, Carbon County, Montana, U.S.
- Coordinates: 45°03′55″N 109°33′33″W
- Terminus: Talus
- Status: Unknown

Beartooth Glacier is in the U.S. state of Montana. The glacier is situated in a cirque northeast of Beartooth Mountain at an average elevation of 10,500 feet (3,200 m) above sea level.

== See also ==
- List of glaciers in the United States
