= Boris Smile =

American band

- Origin: Long Beach, California, United States
- Genres: Indie rock, folk, orchestral
- Years active: 2004–2011
- Labels: Toy, Count Your Lucky Stars
- Past members: A. Wesley Chung; Abigail Davidson; Avi Zahner; Doug Brown; Jon Carman; Matt Profitt; Meagan Christy; Seth Shafer
- Website: www.myspace.com/borissmile

Boris Smile was an American indie-pop collective from Long Beach, California, United States. Started in 2004 by leader A. Wesley Chung, the band's hallmark characteristic was its blend of singer-songwriter pop with orchestral arrangements. Their style is often compared to David Bazan, Page France, The Long Winters, and Sufjan Stevens. The band was signed to Count Your Lucky Stars Records. They disbanded in the summer of 2011.

== Music ==
Boris Smile was formed in 2004 by A. Wesley Chung. While originally created as a solo project named after his young Russian neighbor, it quickly became a band with a rotating door of musicians. Boris Smile released their first full-length record entitled "Chapter I" in the summer of 2007. The album follows Chung's personal experiences in high school, documenting the angst, self-doubt, and absurdity of youth.

During the final stages of "Chapter I," the band began working on the next full-length record, a collection of lo-fi home recordings entitled "Young and it Feels So Good." Chung produced, engineered, and mixed the 18 track record, recording almost all of it in his dining and living room. After six months of work, the album was released in the spring of 2008. "Young and it Feels so Good" is an exploration of youth culture that touches on four main themes: celebration, social separation, the "culture of cool", and growth. The album was considered in the top ten best albums of 2008 by music blog The Album Project.

In the Fall of 2008, Boris Smile released the "Beartooth EP." Produced by Chung and newest recruit Seth Shafer (tuba, keys, arrangements), "Beartooth" stands out as the darkest release in the Boris Smile catalog. The "Beartooth EP" was Boris Smile's first release with Michigan indie label Count Your Lucky Stars Records. The EP stays true to the pop sensibilities of older Boris Smile while entering a moodier world of Chung's writing, which is only enhanced by Shafer's brooding arrangements.

Boris Smile released their "Rockets EP" in March 2010, to mostly positive reviews. The six-track album focuses on a central theme involving the exploration of space and the fears and wonders involved. The growth of the band is made quite clear in this album, from their most recent rendition of the Boris Smile classic "Adventures With Rockets" to the closing track "8.24.06 [The Humbling of a Planet].”

In the Spring of 2011, the band released their final album, "My Love Powered by 10,000 Practice Amps," a 23 track magnum opus celebrating Chung's 2009 experience of living at the L'Abri community in England. The album is characterized by an eclectic mix of songs and styles and revolves around the themes of community, faith/doubt, and strength in weakness.

With the prospects of marriage, moving, and graduations, the band decided to dismantle in the summer of 2011. Boris Smile played their final show on September 5, 2011 at Fingerprints record store in Long Beach, CA. Band members since have continued to work on their own or in other musical projects: The Great Albatross, Avi Buffalo, Day Nurse, Talip Peshkepia, Chase Long Beach, Korey Dane, The Red River, Rainman, Crowd Theory.

== Members ==
- A. Wesley Chung: vocals, acoustic guitar, piano, arrangements
- Abigail Davidson: vocals, clarinet, percussion
- Avi Zahner: electric guitar, lap steel
- Doug Brown: bass
- Jon Carman: drums, percussion
- Jonathan Morin: violin
- Matt Proffitt: trombone
- Meagan Christy: trumpet
- Seth Shafer: tuba, keys, arrangement
- Alan Archambault: electric guitar, lap steel
- Andrew Chen: violin
- Chuck Maizland: electric guitar
- Hannah Davis: vocals
- Heather Trine: vocals
- Jason Chung: bass
- Jon Palsgrove: drums
- Rory Felton: bass
- Stevie Kugelberg: bass

=== Contributors ===
- Brad Lindsay: mandolin, guitar, bass
- Ben Vanderbeek: trombone
- Beth Balmer: keys, viola, cello, accordion
- Bill Roberts: vocals
- Christie Melby-Gibbons: vocals
- David Melby-Gibbons: vocals
- Ed Keller: French horn, trumpet, glockenspiel
- Jessica Garcia: cello
- Jessica "Dobson" Manson: guitar, vocals, bass
- Johanna Vanderbeek: flute, oboe
- Korey Dane: harmonica
- Randy Baranosky: drums
- Rebecca Coleman: vocals
- Rebecca Rivera: bassoon
- Steven Carlson: guitar
- Tess Shapiro: vocals

== Discography ==
=== Albums ===
- Chapter I (2007, self-released)
- Young and It Feels So Good (2008, self-released)
- My Love Powered by 10,000 Practice Amps (expected 2011, Count Your Lucky Stars)

=== EPs ===
- Beartooth EP (2008, Count Your Lucky Stars)
- Rockets EP (2010, Count Your Lucky Stars)
