= Young and It Feels So Good =

Young and it Feels So Good

Studio album by Boris Smile
- Released: 2008
- Genre: Indie rock, folk, orchestral
- Length: 66:05
- Label: (Self-released)

Professional ratings
Review scores
| Source | Rating |
|---|---|
| Absolutepunk.net | Rating: 68% |
| Thealbumproject.net | 4/5 stars |

Young and it Feels So Good is the full-length studio album released by the Long Beach, California band, Boris Smile. The album was self-released in 2008.

== Track listing ==
All songs written by A. Wesley Chung and Boris Smile, except "Seasons" (written by A. Wesley Chung, Jon Palsgrove, and Stevie Kugelberg).

1. "Young and It Feels So Good" – 2:43
2. "Seasons" – 4:13
3. "A Cruel Time in Life" – 3:21
4. "Leper King" – 4:00
5. "False Words and Hummingbirds" – 4:01
6. "Birthday" – 1:51
7. "Home [Sing Along]" – 4:41
8. "Keep It Safe" – 3:56
9. "Beartooth" – 3:45
10. "Marco Polo" – 2:57
11. "Love's Gotta Come from the Heart" – 4:25
12. "Megan Eve of Destruction" – 2:09
13. "Kids Wearing Business Casual" – 2:05
14. "Will It Last" – 2:17
15. "Las Aventuras Con Cohetes" – 6:35
16. "True Colors" – 2:50
17. "Goodnight Moon (Revisited)" – 2:26
18. "When We Found the Truth" – 7:12

Tracks "Love's Gotta Come from the Heart," and "Seasons" have been used on PBS's Roadtrip Nation.

== Personnel ==
- A. Wesley Chung: vocals, guitar, percussion, piano, tape recorder
- Abigail Davidson: vocals, clarinet
- Adam Edwards: trombone
- Alan Archambault: electric guitar, lap steel, dobro
- Andrew Chen: violin
- Avi Buffalo: electric guitar, vocals
- Brad Lindsay: mandolin, guitar
- Brian Chung: piano
- Christian Turner: bass clarinet, bass
- Ed Keller: French horn
- Hannah Davis: vocals
- Jason Chung: bass
- Jon Carman: keys, vocals, flute
- Jon Palsgrove: drums, vocals
- Matt Proffitt: trombone, vocals
- Meagan Christy: trumpet, vocals
- Rebecca Rivera: bassoon
- Rory Felton: bass
- Seth Shafer: tuba, keys
- Stevie Kugelberg: bass
