= Cymbals Eat Guitars =

American indie rock band

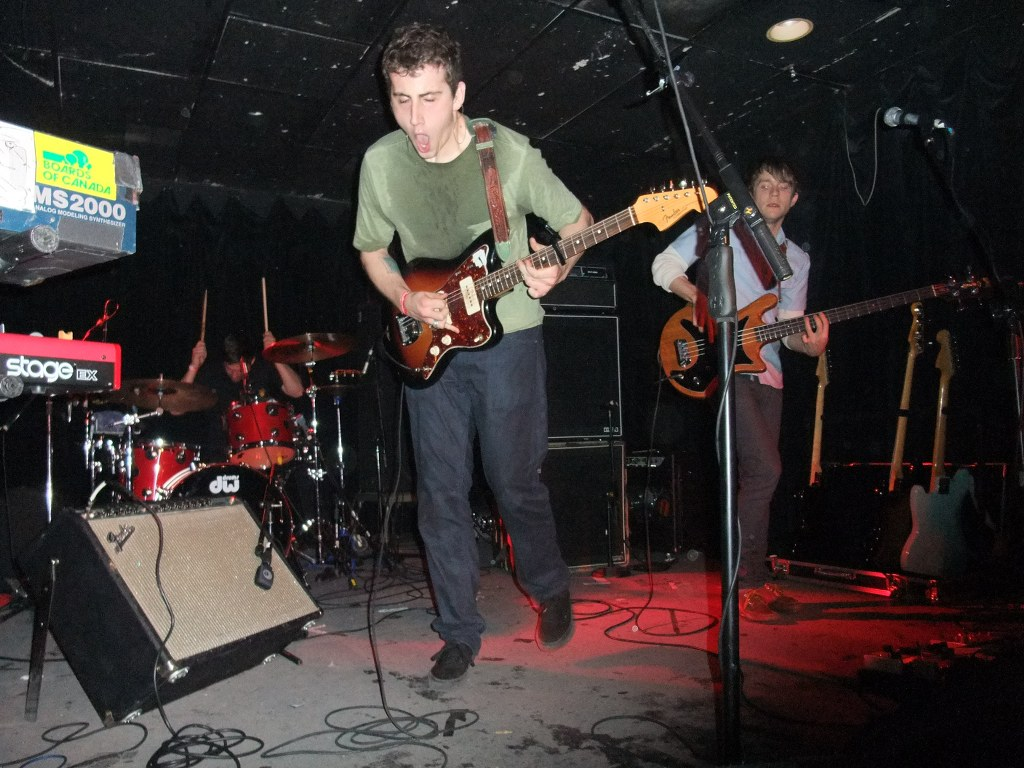
- Cymbals Eat Guitars in 2010

Background information
- Also known as: CEG
- Origin: New York City
- Genres: Indie rock, punk rock, shoegazing, emo
- Years active: 2007–2017
- Labels: Barsuk Records, Sinderlyn
- Spinoffs: Empty Country
- Members: Joseph D'Agostino; Anne Dole; Matt Whipple; Brian Hamilton
- Past members: Neil Berenholz; Daniel Baer; Matthew Cohen; Jon Levine; Matthew Miller
- Website: Band website

Cymbals Eat Guitars were an indie rock band from Staten Island, New York, founded by high school friends Joseph D'Agostino and Matthew Miller. The band's name comes from a Lou Reed quote describing the sound of The Velvet Underground.

== History ==
Cymbals Eat Guitars was founded in 2007 by guitarist Joseph D’Agostino and drummer Matthew Miller, who both graduated from Southern Regional High School in Manahawkin in 2006. Neil Berenholz, guitarist Matt Cohen, and keyboardist Daniel Baer joined the band after responding to an ad D'Agostino posted on Craigslist. 90's alternative bands such as Pavement heavily influenced the band's sound. An early version of the song "Share" was released on the Indiecater Vol. 1 compilation in June 2008.

The band first gained buzz in 2009 when their self-released debut album Why There Are Mountains was included in Pitchfork Media's "Best New Music", earning 8.3/10 in the website's review. Later that year, Cymbals Eat Guitars went on tour with The Pains of Being Pure at Heart and opened a couple of shows for The Flaming Lips. In addition, the band played at the 2009 College Music Journal festival and the Pitchfork Music Festival. In late 2009, the band was chosen as of one Beyond Race Magazine's "50 Emerging Artists," resulting in a spot in the publication's No. 11 issue (with Bodega Girls and J. Cole on the cover), as well as an exclusive Q&A for the magazine's site.

2009 also saw a change in Cymbals Eat Guitar's lineup. Dan Baer, the band's original keyboardist, left the band due to an illness, while the band's original bassist, Neil Berenholz, left due to his dislike of touring. Baer and Berenholz were replaced by Brian Hamilton and Matthew Whipple respectively.

In March 2011, Cymbals Eat Guitars signed with Barsuk Records to produce a follow-up to Why There Are Mountains. The band released their second album Lenses Alien on August 30, 2011. In May 2014, the band announced that their third studio album LOSE will be released on August 26, 2014.

The band opened for Brand New in 2014, and D'Agostino credited the Brand New tour for exposing them to a larger fanbase that would not have occurred on their own.

In October 2015, the band released the song "Aerobed", produced by Brand New lead singer Jesse Lacey, in Kevin Devine’s Devinyl Split series. SPIN gave the song a favorable review, noting its juxtaposition of a quiet acoustic melody and vigorous guitar lines.

The band released their fourth studio album Pretty Years on September 16, 2016.

The band quietly disbanded in late 2017. D'Agostino would form a solo project called Empty Country following the band's breakup.

== Band members ==
Final lineup

- Joseph D'Agostino – guitar, lead vocals (2007–2017)
- Brian Hamilton – keyboards, backing vocals (2009–2017)
- Matt Whipple – bass, backing vocals (2009–2017)
- Anne Dole – drums (2013–2017)

Former

- Matthew Cohen – guitar (2007–2008)
- Daniel Baer – keyboards (2007–2009)
- Matthew Miller – drums (2007–2013)
- Neil Berenholz – bass (2008–2009)
- Jon Levine – bass (2007–2008)

== Discography ==
Albums

- Why There Are Mountains (2009)
- Lenses Alien (2011)
- LOSE (2014)
- Pretty Years (2016)

Singles

| Year | Title | Album |
|---|---|---|
| 2009 | "...And the Hazy Sea/Tunguska" | PureGroove.co.uk exclusive w/slap bracelet |
| 2012 | "Hawk Highway" | Masters From Their Day |
| 2014 | "Jackson" | LOSE |
| 2014 | "Warning" | LOSE |
| 2014 | "Chambers" | LOSE |
| 2016 | "Wish" | Pretty Years |
