= Onsloow =

Norwegian band

- Origin: Trondheim, Norway
- Years active: 2021–present
- Labels: Tiny Engines
- Members: Helene Brunæs; Mathias Nylenna; Morten Samdal; Lasse Berg
- Past members: Johanne Rimul

Onsloow are a band from Trondheim, Norway. The original members of Onsloow were Johanne Rimul (vocals), Mathias Nylenna, Morten Samdal (drums), and Lasse Berg (bass guitar). After their debut album, Rimul left the band and Helene Brunæs joined as vocalist.

Onsloow released their debut album S/T on 21 January 2022. God Is in the TV described the album as sounding like "Avril Lavigne's 15 year old sister eating chips on the beach." In 2024 Onsloow signed to record label Tiny Engines. They released their second album Full Speed Anywhere Else on 25 October 2024. The album was preceded by singles "Taxi", "Brakes", and "Body Parts".

Stereogum included Onsloow on their list of the forty best new artists of 2024.

== Discography ==
=== Albums ===
- S/T (2022)
- Full Speed Anywhere Else (2024, Tiny Engines)

=== Singles ===
- "Overthinking" (2021)
- "A Good Day to Forget" (2021)
- "Being with You" (2021)
- "Taxi" (2024)
- "Brakes" (2024)
- "Body Parts" (2024)
