= Bowback Mountain =

Mountain in Montana, United States

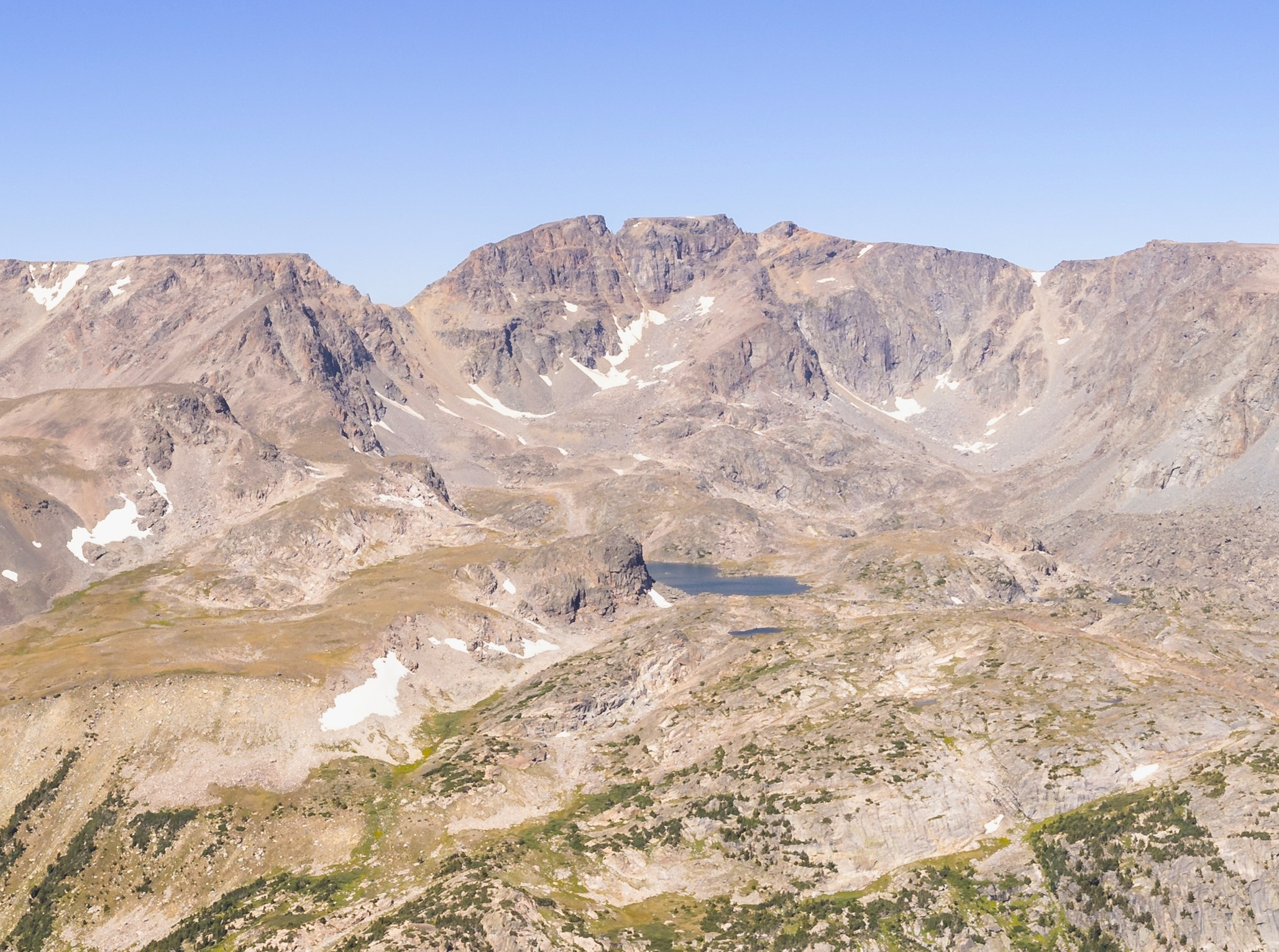
- East aspect

Highest point
- Elevation: 12,356 ft (3,766 m)
- Prominence: 1,711 ft (522 m)
- Coordinates: 45°07′40″N 109°37′06″W

Geography
- Location within Montana Location within the United States
- Location: Carbon County, Montana, U.S.
- Parent range: Beartooth Mountains
- Topo map: USGS Sylvan Peak

Bowback Mountain (12,356 feet (3,766 m)) is in the Beartooth Mountains in the U.S. state of Montana. The peak is one of the tallest in the Beartooth Mountains, the 11th tallest in Montana (tied with Beartooth Mountain) and is in the Absaroka-Beartooth Wilderness in Custer National Forest.
