= Museum Mouth =

North Carolina-based indie rock group

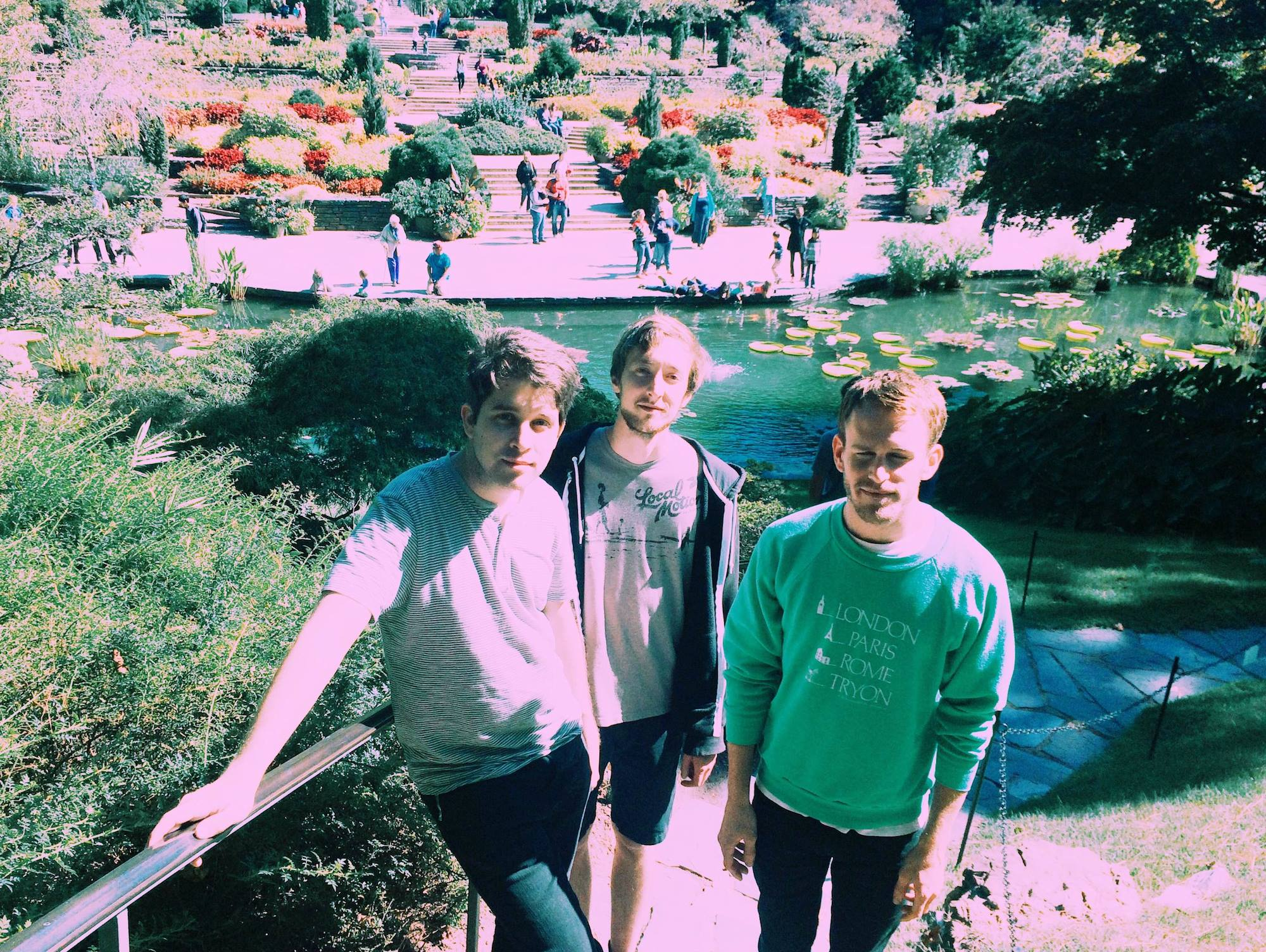

Background information
- Origin: Southport, North Carolina
- Genres: Indie rock, noise pop
- Years active: 2009–present
- Labels: Tiny Engines, Equal Vision, Rory
- Members: Karl Kuehn, Kory Urban, Morgan Roberts
- Past members: Savannah Levin, Graham High
- Website: http://www.museummouth.com/

Museum Mouth is a band that originated in Southport, North Carolina, in 2009. It consists of three members: Karl Kuehn who also played in the band Family Bike (drums, vocals), Kory Urban (bass), and Morgan Roberts (guitar). Originally, Savannah Levin played bass and provided vocals but left the band in September 2010. Their band name is a reference to a line in the song "Little League" by Cap'n Jazz. Their musical genres include pop punk and rock. Museum Mouth is one of the more famous and long lasting bands to come out of the Wilmington DIY scene.

"Tears In My Beer", "Sexy But Not Happy", and "Alex I Am Nothing" received four-star reviews from Punknews.org.

== Discography ==
Full-Lengths

- Tears In My Beer (3/10/2010)
- Sexy But Not Happy (1/23/2012)
- Alex I Am Nothing (5/27/2014)
- Popcorn Fish Guinea Pig (4/29/2016)

EPs

- I Am The Idiot Of The Jungle (2/2/2010)
- U R WHO U LET DIE (12/21/2012)
- Most Likely To Be Conflicted (7/24/2015)

Singles

- "Outside" (3/1/2010)
- "Egghead" (Appears on the Pastepunk 12th Anniversary Compilation, 10/12/2010)
- "Blood Mountain" (1/11/2012)
- "End of Days Reprise" (10/25/19)
