= Lenses Alien =

Studio album by Cymbals Eat Guitars
- Released: August 30, 2011
- Recorded: 2011
- Genre: Indie rock
- Length: 39:13
- Label: Memphis Industries, Barsuk Records
- Producer: John Agnello

Cymbals Eat Guitars chronology
Why There Are Mountains (2009)	Lenses Alien (2011)	LOSE (2014)

Original cover

Lenses Alien is the second album by the indie rock band Cymbals Eat Guitars, released August 30, 2011 on Barsuk Records. The album was produced by John Agnello and received generally positive reviews.

== Background and recording ==
Cymbals Eat Guitars had gained much buzz following the release of their self-released debut album Why There Are Mountains, touring with The Pains of Being Pure at Heart in 2009 and playing at the 2010 Lollapalooza. In addition, the band saw a change in its lineup following the release of their debut album. Dan Baer, the band's original keyboardist, left the band due to an illness, while the band's original bassist, Neil Berenholz, left due to his dislike of touring. Baer and Berenholz were replaced by Brian Hamilton and Matthew Whipple respectively. In March 2011, the band signed with Barsuk Records to record a follow-up to Why There Are Mountains.

Lenses Alien was recorded in Brooklyn and took only 15 days to record. According to an interview with Stereogum, the album's sound was influenced by Spiritualized, Bedhead and slowcore. In July 2011, the band premiered the first track from the album: "Rifle Eyesight (Proper Name)" as a free MP3 download. On August 23, 2011, the album was streamed in its entirety on Spin.

The album cover was originally a collage that the band did as a homage to an artist the band admired. However, the artist was not happy with the cover, so the band changed the cover out of respect for the artist.

== Musical style ==
Many critics compared Lenses Alien to 90's indie rock bands such as Superchunk and Built to Spill. Allmusic described the album as "darker" and "moodier" than Why There Are Mountains. NME noted a diverse range of genres on the album, such as noise rock, post-hardcore and progressive rock.

== Track listing ==
No.	Title	Length
1.	"Rifle Eyesight (Proper Name)"	8:32
2.	"Shore Points"	2:35
3.	"Keep Me Waiting"	3:00
4.	"Plainclothes"	4:13
5.	"Definite Darkness"	4:52
6.	"Another Tunguska"	3:12
7.	"The Current"	2:07
8.	"Wavelengths"	2:54
9.	"Secret Family"	3:29
10.	"Gary Condit"	4:19

== Reception ==
Professional ratings
Review scores
Source	Rating
Allmusic	3.5/5 stars
The A.V. Club	(B+)
Consequence of Sound	4/5 stars
Drowned in Sound	(8/10)
The Guardian	4/5 stars
NME	(7/10)
Pitchfork Media	(8.0/10)
Slant Magazine	4/5 stars
Spin	(8/10)

Lenses Alien has received mostly positive reviews. On the review aggregate site Metacritic, the album has a score of 79 out of 100, indicating "Generally favorable reviews".

Allmusic's Gregory Heaney praised the album's darker sound, writing "This kind of shift marks Cymbals Eat Guitars as a band that is willing to grow their sound rather than just be content to release the same album again and again, making Lenses Alien an album that's not only a great follow-up to their first album, but a promise of good things yet to come." Mike LeChevallier of Slant Magazine, comparing the album positively to Built to Spill, Pavement, and Superchunk, wrote "All three of those bands masterfully juggle creative lyrics with equally inventive music, something Cymbals Eat Guitars comes very close to achieving on Lenses Alien." In another positive review, Drowned in Sound's Simon Jay Catling wrote "With their nerve held, this is Cymbals Eat Guitars at an impressively high creative watermark still early in their career." Winston Robbins of Consequence of Sound praised the album for getting over the sophomore slump, writing "The album could have gone a bit smoother or carried a simpler, more cohesive theme, but at the end of the day, Cymbals Eat Guitars have succeeded in creating one of the year's most surprisingly transcendental sophomore albums."

NME's Tom Pinnock was less receptive to Lenses Alien writing "While they mainly hit a balance between shifting symphonics, subtle keys and pyroclastic guitar, sometimes – such as on 'Plainclothes', a ballad/disco/punk-funk/noise jigsaw – there's just too much going on." However, Pinnock concluded, "But hey, layabouts, that's called taking a risk." Ian Cohen of Pitchfork Media, in an otherwise positive review, agreed with Pinnock's sentiment, writing "The downside is how the music occasionally buckles under the weight of its own restlessness and D'Agostino's words-- a slightly skewed ratio of visceral immediacy to cerebral satisfaction making it a slight notch below Why There Are Mountains."

== Personnel ==
The following people contributed to Lenses Alien:

=== Cymbals Eat Guitars ===
- Joseph D'Agostino – guitar, vocals
- Brian Hamilton – keyboards, vocals
- Matthew Miller – percussion, drums
- Matthew Whipple – bass guitar, vocals, guitar (baritone)

=== Additional personnel ===
- Heide Vanderlee – cello
- John Agnello – producer, engineer
- Greg Calbi – mastering
- Ted Young – engineer
- Theo Aronson – engineer
- Jeremy Withers – layout
