= Joie De Vivre (band) =

American emo band

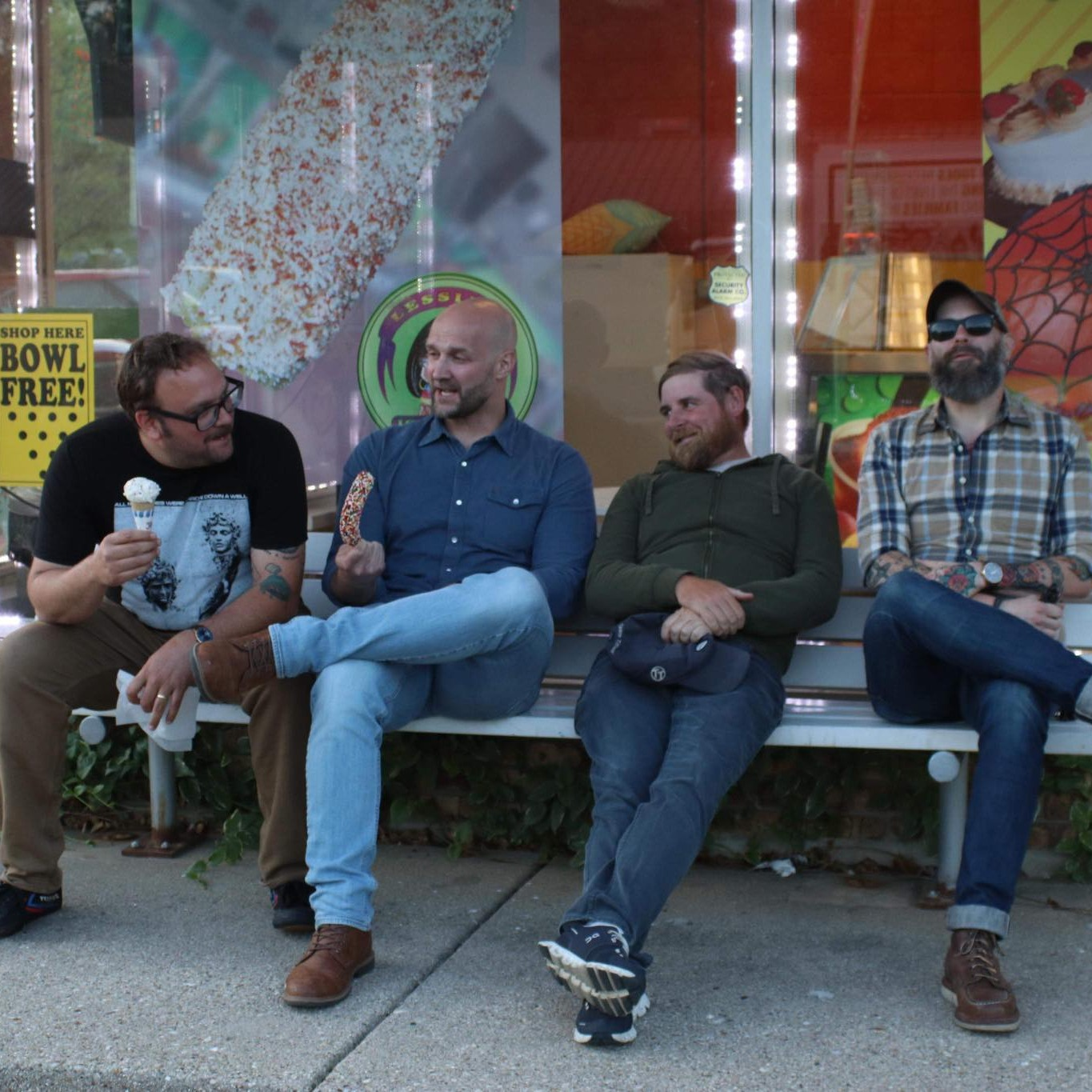

Background information
- Origin: Rockford, Illinois
- Genres: Midwest emo; indie rock; indie pop; post-rock
- Years active: 2007–2011, 2012-present
- Labels: Count Your Lucky Stars; Run For Cover; Topshelf; Stiff Slack; Keep It Together
- Members: Brandon Lutmer; Patrick Delehanty; Chris French; Stewart Oakes
- Past members: Warren Franklin; Mark Jaeschke; Steven Kurzac; Paul Karnatz; Zach Staas; Geoffrey Schott
- Website: joiedevivreband.com

Joie De Vivre is an American emo band from Rockford, Illinois, United States.

== History ==
Joie De Vivre formed in 2007. Since then, they have released two full-length albums, an EP, and several splits. The band temporarily broke up in 2011, when they finished their sophomore album, We're All Better Than This. Following the completion of the album, the band reunited in 2012 and completed a tour of Europe in June / July 2012. Since 2012, they have released two splits, one with Empire! Empire! (I Was a Lonely Estate) and Prawn. While still an active band since 2012, they've limited their activity to spot shows around the Midwest.

They are currently recording a new album.

== Band members ==
Current members

- Brandon Lutmer (vocals, bass)
- Patrick Delehanty (guitar)
- Stewart Oakes (drums)
- Chris French (guitar)

Former members

- Warren Franklin (guitar)
- Steven Kurzac (drums)
- Paul Karnatz (cornet, mellophone)
- Zach Staas (organ)
- Geoff Schott (guitar)
- Mark Jaeschke (trumpet)

== Discography ==
Studio albums

- The North End (2010)
- We're All Better Than This (2012)

EPs

- Summer Months (2009)

Splits

- Empire! Empire! (I Was a Lonely Estate) / Joie De Vivre (2014)
- Joie De Vivre / Prawn (2014)
- Joie De Vivre / The Please & Thank Yous / Emo Side Project (2012)
- Annabel / Empire! Empire! (I Was a Lonely Estate) / Joie De Vivre / The Reptilian (2011)
- Joie De Vivre / Sleep Bellum Sonno (2011)

Compilations

- Breaking Up With (2011)
