= Lose (album) =

Studio album by Cymbals Eat Guitars
- Released: August 26, 2014
- Recorded: 2013
- Genre: Indie rock
- Length: 44:45
- Labels: Barsuk Records, Tough Love Records
- Producer: John Agnello

Cymbals Eat Guitars chronology
Lenses Alien (2011)	Lose (2014)	Pretty Years (2016)

Singles from Lose
- 1. "Jackson" Released: May 19, 2014; 2. "Chambers" Released: July 3, 2014; 3. "Warning" Released: November 3, 2014

Professional ratings
Aggregate scores
Source	Rating
Metacritic	78/100
Review scores
Source	Rating
Tiny Mix Tapes	4.5/5 stars
Paste Magazine	(8.8/10)
Pitchfork Media	(8.2/10)
PopMatters	(8/10)
Under the Radar	(7/10)

Lose is the third studio album by the American indie rock band Cymbals Eat Guitars, released by Tough Love Records on August 25, 2014 in the UK and by Barsuk Records on August 26, 2014 in the U.S.

== Track listing ==
All lyrics are written by Joseph D'Agostino; all music is composed by Cymbals Eat Guitars.

No.	Title	Length
1.	"Jackson"	6:14
2.	"Warning"	3:20
3.	"XR"	2:34
4.	"Place Names"	6:15
5.	"Child Bride"	3:25
6.	"Laramie"	8:07
7.	"Chambers"	3:48
8.	"LifeNet"	3:23
9.	"2 Hip Soul"	6:29
Total length:		44:45
