= Beartooth EP =

EP by Boris Smile
- Released: 2008
- Genre: Indie rock, folk, orchestral
- Length: 20:11
- Label: Count Your Lucky Stars Records

Professional ratings
Review scores
Source	Rating
Absolutepunk.net	76%
Thealbumproject.net	3/5 stars

Beartooth EP is an album released by the Long Beach, California band, Boris Smile. The album was released by Count Your Lucky Stars Records in 2008.

== Track listing ==
All songs written by A. Wesley Chung and Boris Smile.

1. "Beartooth (spooky version)" – 3:35
2. "Hour of the Wolf" – 2:49
3. "Tut Tut" – 5:54
4. "Program me to Love" – 4:14
5. "Books of Blank Pages" – 3:39

== Personnel ==
- A. Wesley Chung vocals, acoustic guitar, percussion, piano, saxophone
- Abigail Davidson: vocals, percussion
- Amy Sundahl: vocals
- Avi Buffalo: electric guitar, looper, vocals
- Beth Balmer: violin, viola, cello
- Doug Brown: bass
- Hannah Ellis: vocals
- Jessie Flasschoen; vocals
- Jonathan Holden: vocals
- Jon Palsgrove: drums, vocals
- Meagan Christy: trumpet
- Rebecca Coleman: vocals
- Ryan Smernoff: vocals
- Seth Shafer: keyboard/synth, tuba
- Stevie Kugelberg: bass
