= Football, etc. =

American emo band

- Origin: Houston, Texas
- Genres: Midwest emo, emo, indie rock
- Years active: 2009–present
- Members: James Vehslage; Lindsay Minton; Mercy Harper

Football, etc. is an American midwest emo band from Houston, Texas.

== History ==
Football, etc. began in 2009 with the release of a four song EP titled First Down. They signed to Count Your Lucky Stars Records in June 2009. Later the same year, Football, etc. released a split with fellow emo band Empire! Empire! (I Was a Lonely Estate). Football, etc. released their first full-length in 2011 titled The Draft on Count Your Lucky Stars and Strictly No Capital Letters. In 2013, Football, etc. released a split with the band Plaids. Also in 2013, Football, etc. released their second full-length album titled Audible, on Count Your Lucky Stars and Strictly No Capital Letters. In 2015, Football, etc. released an EP titled Disappear on Count Your Lucky Stars and Strictly No Capital Letters. In 2017, Football, etc. released their third full-length album, Corner, on Community Records and Barely Regal Records. In 2022 Football, etc. released a four song EP titled Vision, recorded and mixed by J. Robbins of Jawbox.

== Discography ==
Studio albums

- The Draft (2011)
- Audible (2013)
- Corner (2017)

EPs

- First Down (2009)
- Football, etc. (2010)
- Disappear (2015)
- Vision (2022)

Splits

- Football, etc./Empire Empire (I Was A Lonely Estate) (2009)
- Football, etc./Square Business (2012)
- Football, etc./Plaids (2013)
