= Gay Meat =

American musician

Gay Meat is the stage name of American musician Karl Kuehn. Kuehn is formerly a member of the bands Museum Mouth and Family Bike. Kuehn is from Wilmington, North Carolina. Kuehn is currently signed to the record label Skeletal Lightning.

== History ==
Kuehn attended Savannah College of Art and Design but ended up dropping out. Kuehn founded the band Museum Mouth in 2009, which he sang and drummed for until the band went on hiatus due to Kuehn's mother having seizures. After six years of working on the album, Kuehn launched a solo career under the name "Gay Meat" and released his debut album titled "Blue Water". The album received positive reviews.

== Discography ==
Studio albums

- Blue Water (2026, Skeletal Lightning)
