= Youth Pictures of Florence Henderson =

- Origin: Bodø, Norway
- Genres: Post-rock
- Years active: 2003 - present
- Labels: How is Annie Records
- Website: ypofh.com

Youth Pictures of Florence Henderson is a Norwegian post-rock band, formed by journalism students in Bodø in 2003. The band is now located in Oslo.

== History ==
Youth Pictures of Florence Henderson came to be when a group of four classmates—Morten (drums), Gjermund (guitar), Torbjørn (guitar) and Audun (bass) -- at the Bodø University College decided to start a band in the fall of 2003. Their first demo, recorded in early 2004, consisted of everything from pop, via country and punk, to long and dreamy post-rock tunes. They decided they liked the latter genre, represented by the song "A List Not To Be Read At Your Wedding", the best, and thus started making more songs similar to that one.

During the following year they recorded a series of songs in their school's bomb shelter, six of which ended up on their début album, Unnoticeable In A Tiny Town, Invisible In The City, released on their own newly started label, How is Annie Records, on May 21, 2005.

"Unnoticeable..." received a number of quite complimentary reviews nationally. Norway's largest and longest running online music newspaper, Panorama, called it "A flood of feelings" and "world class post-rock", deeming it the second best Norwegian album of 2005. They were hailed as the Norwegian newcomers of the year by the magazine Puls. Their début also made it into The Silent Ballet's top 50 list of 2005. The Silent Ballet's reviewer was taken by the band's "warm, honest approach to song writing through gentle guitars and smooth drumming".

In 2010, they released the self-titled follow-up, which was a continuation and expansion of their mix of old-school emo and modern post-rock. The physical release came as two discs (entitled Puzzle and The Detective)) in a 32-paged A5 book with art by Hans Hansen and Hanne Grieg Hermansen. The album was well received by critics. It was chosen to be part of AudioSuede's "The Best Albums of 2010 (So Far...)" list in June, and received generally favourable reviews all over. It is the first of their albums to be distributed in the USA, where it is sold by the label Robotic Empire. The album has a complete lack of programmed sounds, thus resulting in a more organic sound.

Following the release of their second album, the band did a European tour in September 2010.

== Discography ==
=== Full Lengths ===
- Unnoticeable in A Tiny Town, Invisible in the City CD (How Is Annie Records/Dead Letter Records, 2004)
- Youth Pictures of Florence Henderson CD (How Is Annie Records/Friend of Mine Records, 2010)

=== EP ===
- Small Changes We Hardly Notice (Count Your Lucky Stars Records, 2012)
