= Truth Club =

American band

- Origin: Raleigh, North Carolina
- Genres: Indie rock; Post-punk revival; Slowcore
- Members: Travis Harrington; Kameron Vann; Yvonne Chazal; Elise Jaffe

Truth Club is an American indie rock band from Raleigh, North Carolina.

== History ==
Truth Club released their debut album, Not an Exit, in 2019 through Tiny Engines. The group returned in January 2023, releasing a new song "It's Time". Six months later, the band released another new song "Blue Eternal". In June 2023, the band announced they had signed to Double Double Whammy. In August 2023, the band announced their second album Running from the Chase, due out on October 6, 2023, and released the song "Exit Cycle" featuring fellow North Carolina musician Indigo De Souza.

== Discography ==
Albums

- Not an Exit (2019)
- Running from the Chase (2023)
