= Thank You, I'm Sorry (band) =

American emo band

- Origin: Chicago, Illinois, U.S.
- Genres: Indie rock; emo
- Years active: 2018–2025
- Label: Count Your Lucky Stars
- Spinoffs: Mealworm
- Past members: Abe Anderson; Colleen Dow; Sage Livergood; Bethunni Schreiner
- Website: thankyouimsorryband.com

Thank You, I'm Sorry was an American indie rock band from Chicago, Illinois.

== History ==
Thank You, I'm Sorry began in 2018. The band started as the solo project of lead singer Colleen Dow. In early 2020, the group signed to Michigan based record label Count Your Lucky Stars Records. As a solo project, Dow recorded and released an acoustic album in February 2020 titled The Malta House. The album title is a reference to the village of Malta, Illinois. After the release of The Malta House, the project expanded to a four-piece, consisting of Dow, bassist Bethunni Schreiner, guitarist Abe Anderson, and drummer Sage Livergood. The group released their debut album I'm Glad We're Friends on August 21, 2020, through Count Your Lucky Stars. The album received positive reviews. In early 2022, the band released a new song titled "Parliaments". Their sophomore album, Growing in Strange Places, was released on September 29, 2023, which was their final release under Count Your Lucky Stars. On January 31, 2024, they announced an EP titled Repeating Threes to be self-released on March 8.

On May 29, 2024, it was announced that Anderson and Schreiner would be leaving the band to pursue other endeavors, and that Dow and Livergood would continue Thank You, I’m Sorry "alongside some new members".

=== Hiatus and disbandment ===
On October 22, 2024, Dow announced that Thank You, I'm Sorry's concert in Portland, Oregon on October 29 would be the band's last show "for awhile". While Dow stated that the band wasn't necessarily done forever, they elaborated, "for now I need to take a step back and allow the work I've done to speak for itself or simply be a sign that this time in my life is wrapping up". Dow also stated that they would be focusing on their other band, Mealworm, calling it "a project that doesn't make me feel perpetually 19".

On July 16, 2025, Dow announced via Instagram that Thank You, I'm Sorry had officially "come to an end".

== Discography ==
=== Studio albums ===
Title	Details
Title	Details
The Malta House	Released: February 7, 2020; Label: Count Your Lucky Stars; Formats: Cassette, digital download, streaming
I'm Glad We're Friends	Released: August 21, 2020; Label: Count Your Lucky Stars; Formats: LP, digital download, streaming
Growing in Strange Places	Released: September 29, 2023; Label: Count Your Lucky Stars; Formats: LP, digital download, streaming

=== EPs ===
Title	Details
Repeating Threes	Released: March 8, 2024; Label: Self-released; Format: 7”, digital download

=== Demo EPs ===
Title	Details
The Malta House Demos	Released: March 25, 2019 (Bandcamp only); Label: Self-released; Format: Digital download

=== Compilation EPs ===
Title	Details
Quarantine Comp (with Abe Anderson, The Acid Flashback at Nightmare Beach, Jimmy Montague, Marco Aziel, and Ness Lake)	Released: March 27, 2020 (Bandcamp only); Label: Self-released; Format: Digital download

=== Singles ===
Title	Year	Album
"How Many Slugs Can We Throw Against the Wall Until We Question Our Own Mortality" / "Manic Pixie Dream Hurl"	2020	The Malta House
"Cell Phone"	2020	Quarantine Comp
"Manic Pixie Dream Hurl"	2020	I'm Glad We're Friends
"Backpack Life"	2020	I'm Glad We're Friends
"Follow Unfollow"	2020	I'm Glad We're Friends
"Parliaments"	2022	Non-album singles
"Christmas Lights"	2022	Non-album singles
"Chronically Online"	2023	Growing in Strange Places
"This House"	2023	Growing in Strange Places
"Autonomy Shop"	2023	Growing in Strange Places
"Mirror"	2023	Growing in Strange Places
"When I Come East"	2024	Repeating Threes
