= CSTVT =

American emo band

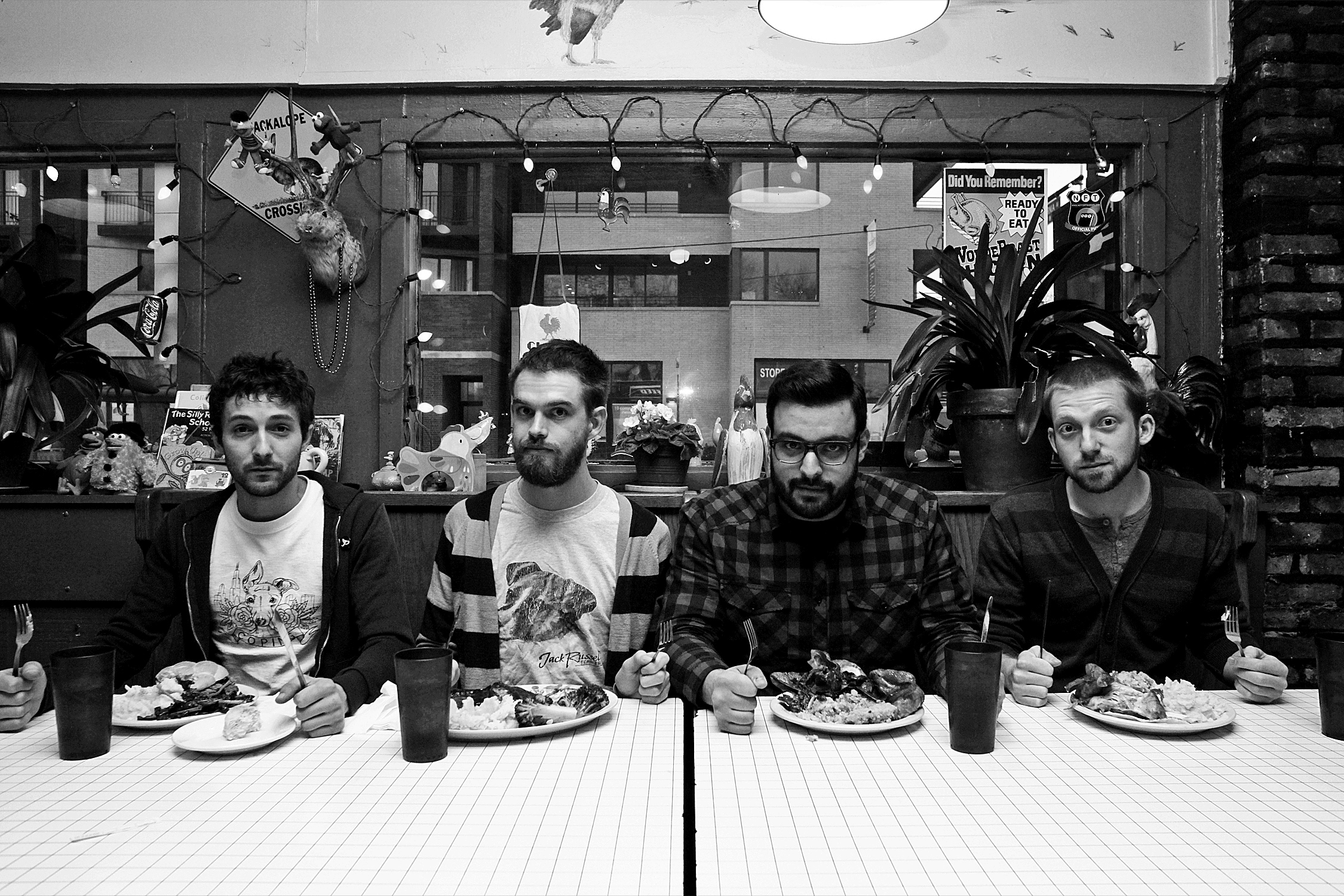
- CSTVT pictured at Feed restaurant in Chicago, Illinois on April 27, 2011. From left to right: Josh Snader, Will McEvilly, Nick Wakim and Ron Petzke.

Background information
- Also known as: Castevet
- Origin: Chicago, Illinois
- Genres: Emo; indie rock; post-hardcore; punk rock
- Years active: 2007–2013
- Labels: Big Scary Monsters; Count Your Lucky Stars; Ice Age; Kid Sister Everything; Run for Cover; Stiff Slack; Tiny Engines; Topshelf
- Past members: Nick Wakim; Will McEvilly; Ron Petzke; Josh Snader

CSTVT, originally known as Castevet, was an American emo band from Chicago. The band was founded in mid-2007, by lead vocalist and guitarist Nick Wakim, guitarist Will McEvilly, backing vocalist and bass guitarist Ron Petzke, and drummer Josh Snader; the line-up remained intact until its demise in 2013. Members of Castevet have also played in Bongripper, Into It. Over It., Lifted Bells, Tower of Rome, and Weekend Nachos. In December 2010, the band changed the spelling of its name from Castevet to CSTVT, though the pronunciation remained the same.

The band released two full-length albums: Summer Fences on Count Your Lucky Stars Records in 2009, and The Echo & The Light on Tiny Engines / Stiff Slack in 2010. Its discography also includes a 2008 self-released EP, I Know What a Lion Is, the EP version of The Echo & The Light, released on Ice Age Records / Kid Sister Everything in 2009, a split with Into It. Over It., titled Snack Town, on Topshelf Records in 2010, and the eponymous single, CSTVT, on Run for Cover Records in 2011. The band was working on a third full-length album at the time of its break-up.

== History ==
=== Summer Fences and The Echo & The Light EP (2007–2009) ===
Castevet formed in mid-2007, when guitarists Will McEvilly and Nick Wakim got together and wrote the song "Beating High Schoolers at Arcade Games". Bass guitarist Ron Petzke joined two days later after hearing McEvilly and Wakim play the song for him. Drummer Josh Snader was the final member to join the band, while Wakim assumed lead vocal duties and Petzke took up backing vocals. The band's influences include Hot Water Music, Saves the Day, Braid, Texas Is the Reason, Jawbreaker, American Football, Mineral, and The Promise Ring.

Castevet played its first show on March 1, 2008, in Urbana, Illinois. Later that summer, the band recorded eight songs for its debut album, Summer Fences, with producer Dennis Pleckham (who played in the band Bongripper with Petzke) at Comatose Studio. The band then self-released a demo CD-R that included three unmastered songs ("Between Berwyn and Bryn Mawr," "Plays One on TV," and "I Know What a Lion Is") from the session under the title I Know What a Lion Is, followed by a handful of self-released CD-Rs of its debut album to sell at shows. On the strength of Summer Fences, Michigan-based record label Count Your Lucky Stars Records signed Castevet and properly released the band's debut album on compact disc and digitally on June 9, 2009.

The band entered Mainstay Audio Recording in September 2009, to record six new songs ("Narrow Hallways," "Hiccups," "Lautrec," "Midwest Values," "Bike Notes," and "Cities & Memory") with producer Adam Tatro for its follow-up EP, The Echo & The Light. The new material garnered the attention of British record label Big Scary Monsters Recording Company, which signed Castevet to a multi-record deal in November 2009, and announced that it would release The Echo & The Light on 12-inch vinyl and digitally on February 23, 2010. Meanwhile, the band embarked on its first tour: a nine-date winter trip with label-mates Grown Ups, spanning from December 26, 2009 to January 3, 2010. During this tour, Castevet sold limited edition versions of The Echo & The Light: a cassette tape edition released through Ice Age Records and a CD-R edition released through Kid Sister Everything.

=== The Echo & The Light LP and Snack Town (2010) ===
By January 2010, the band had parted ways with Big Scary Monsters Recording Company and opted to fully re-record The Echo & The Light, adding in the process two new songs ("Six Parts Summer" and "Model Trains"). The band cited that it had been unhappy with the mix of the original version of The Echo & The Light, and returned to Comatose Studio in February 2010 to re-record the songs with producer Dennis Pleckham, upgrading the release from an EP into an album.

In April 2010, Castevet was signed to North Carolina–based record label Tiny Engines, announcing the release of the album version of The Echo & The Light on 12-inch vinyl and digitally for June 29, 2010. The album was, however, delayed until August 17, 2010. Japanese record label Stiff Slack, which had originally planned to release the six-song EP version, ended up releasing a compact disc edition of the eight-song album version on July 20, 2010. Tiny Engines later repressed the 12-inch vinyl in December 2011.

In May 2010, Castevet was signed to Massachusetts-based record label Topshelf Records. The label announced that it would release a split 7-inch vinyl between Castevet and Into It. Over It. as part of its Twelve Towns Series. The split, titled Snack Town, included two new Castevet songs ("Chilsen" and "(Get) Bucktown") recorded at the end of May 2010 at Drasik Studios with producer Mark Michalik, and was released on vinyl on July 28, 2010, and digitally on August 14, 2010. Castevet embarked on its second tour: six dates with Into It. Over It. spanning from June 29 to July 4, 2010.

=== CSTVT and unfinished third album (2010–2013) ===
In September 2010, Castevet was signed to Massachusetts-based record label Run for Cover Records (which shared offices with Topshelf Records), announcing that it was recording two more new songs ("Ghost Boat" and "Rogers Alexandra") that month at Drasik Studios with producer Mark Michalik, planned for a 7-inch vinyl single due out in late 2010 (eventually released in February 2011). It was also announced that the label would be releasing the band's forthcoming third full-length album, scheduled for 2011. The band then embarked on an eight-date winter tour with Stay Ahead of the Weather, spanning from December 26, 2010 to January 2, 2011. On December 25, 2010, on the eve of leaving for its third tour, Castevet announced that it was changing the spelling of the band's name to CSTVT, due to conflicts with the homonymous New York post-black metal band Castevet.

CSTVT released its eponymous two-song 7-inch vinyl and digital single through Run for Cover Records on February 15, 2011. In April 2011, CSTVT recorded the song "Bassett St." at Drasik Studios with producer Mark Michalik, exclusively for the Run for Cover Records Various Artists compilation Mixed Signals, which was released on 12-inch vinyl, compact disc, and digitally on September 6, 2011; although the band continued to compose material for its planned third album, and played shows until 2013, it would be the band's final recorded output.

== Legacy ==
In December 2009, Punk News ranked Summer Fences number 16 in its list Top 20 Albums of 2009. In December 2010, Washington City Paper listed The Echo & The Light in its top-ten list The Best New Old Emo of 2010, while Rockfreaks ranked Snack Town number 8 in its list Best Music of 2010.

In June 2017, Spin magazine ranked Summer Fences number 29 in its list 30 Best Emo Revival Albums. In November 2019, New Noise Magazine included Summer Fences in its list of "essential records that played a role in elevating the influence of American Football." In January 2020, Chicago Reader ranked The Echo & The Light number 28 in its list The Best Chicago Albums of the 2010s. In February 2020, Vulture ranked Castevet's song "Between Berwyn and Bryn Mawr" number 80 in its list The 100 Greatest Emo Songs of All Time.

Bands that have cited CSTVT as influential include Foxing, Vision Eternel, Kerosene Heights, Dead Sailors, ThreadBear, and Edward Joseph.

== Members ==
- Nick Wakim – lead vocals, guitar
- Will McEvilly – guitar
- Ron Petzke – bass guitar, backing vocals
- Josh Snader – drums

== Discography ==
Studio albums

- Summer Fences (self-released, 2008 / re-issued by Count Your Lucky Stars, 2009)
- The Echo & The Light (Tiny Engines/Stiff Slack, 2010)

EPs and splits

- I Know What a Lion Is (self-released, 2008)
- The Echo & The Light (Ice Age/Kid Sister Everything, 2009)
- Snack Town – split with Into It. Over It. (Topshelf, 2010)
- CSTVT (Run for Cover, 2011)
