= Thelma (musician) =

American indie-folk musician

Natasha Jean Jacobs, professionally known as Thelma, is an American indie-folk musician from upstate New York.

== Music career ==
=== Thelma ===
In 2017, Jacobs released Thelma via Tiny Engines. The album was ranked 23rd on the UPROXX "50 Best Albums of 2017" list and received an 8/10 rating from Clash. AdHoc wrote, "Thelma’s self-titled LP was one of the best debuts of 2017. Her voice plunges and climbs and ricochets through sparse fields of percussion, strings, and synth. And she does these things with breathless focus and poise." Jacobs wrote Thelma while studying at SUNY Purchase. The album featured Juan Pablo Siles on guitar, Daniel Siles on drums, and Maciej Lewandowski on bass.

=== The Only Thing ===
In 2019, Jacobs self-released The Only Thing. The album featured Daniel Siles on drums, Maciej Lewandowski on bass, Roan Ma on violin, and Laura Wolf Schatz on cello. Jacobs wrote the project while recovering from surgery. The Only Thing received a 4.5 star rating on Tiny Mix Tapes. Stereogum wrote about the project, "Many of its songs stem from a reckoning with what it means to be an artist, and how it feels when the body that’s meant to support you tries to sabotage your goals at every turn." Exclaim! called Jacobs' music, "just so beautifully alive, especially amongst the craggy obstacles, which echo back the sounds of her ghostly voice."

== Personal life ==
Jacobs is based in Brooklyn, New York.

Jacobs refers to herself as “a music maker and sound explorer”. She was previously a sound designer for Vice News Reports. She is currently an audio engineer and sound designer for Lemonada Media.

== Releases ==
=== Albums ===
- The Only Thing, 2019
- Thelma, 2016

=== Singles ===
- "Stranger Love", 2019
- "Sway", 2019
- "Take Me to Orlando", 2018
- "If You Let It", 2016

=== Music videos ===
- "Stranger Love", 2019
- “Take Me to Orlando”, 2019
- "Spool", 2017
- "Peach", 2017
