= Annabel (band) =

American emo band

- Origin: Akron, U.S.
- Genres: emo
- Years active: 2009–present

Annabel is an American emo band from Akron, Ohio. To date, Annabel has released four full-length albums. Their first album, titled Each and Everyone, was released in 2009. Annabel released an EP titled Here We Are Tomorrow in 2010. In 2012, Annabel released their second full-length album titled Youth In Youth. In 2014, Annabel released a split with Chicago emo band Dowsing. In 2015, Annabel released their third full-length album titled Having It All.

In June 2024 the band returned with the album Worldviews.
