= Strange Relations (band) =

American indie rock band

Strange Relations is an American indie rock band from Minneapolis, Minnesota.

== History ==
Strange Relations began in 2011, shortly after the members moved to Minneapolis. Their debut album, -CENTRISM, was released in 2015. The band released an EP in 2016 titled Going Out. In 2017, Strange Relations released their sophomore album, Editorial You, on Tiny Engines.

== Discography ==
Studio albums

- -CENTRISM (2015, self-released)
- Editorial You (2017, Tiny Engines)

EPs

- Going Out (2016, Tiny Engines)

== Band members ==
- Casey Sowa (vocals, drums)
- Maro Helgeson (vocals, bass, synth)

== Former members ==
- Andrew ‘Theramu’ Shaw (Guitar).
- Nate Hart-Andersen (Guitar).
