= Bears Tooth =

Mountain spire in the state of Montana

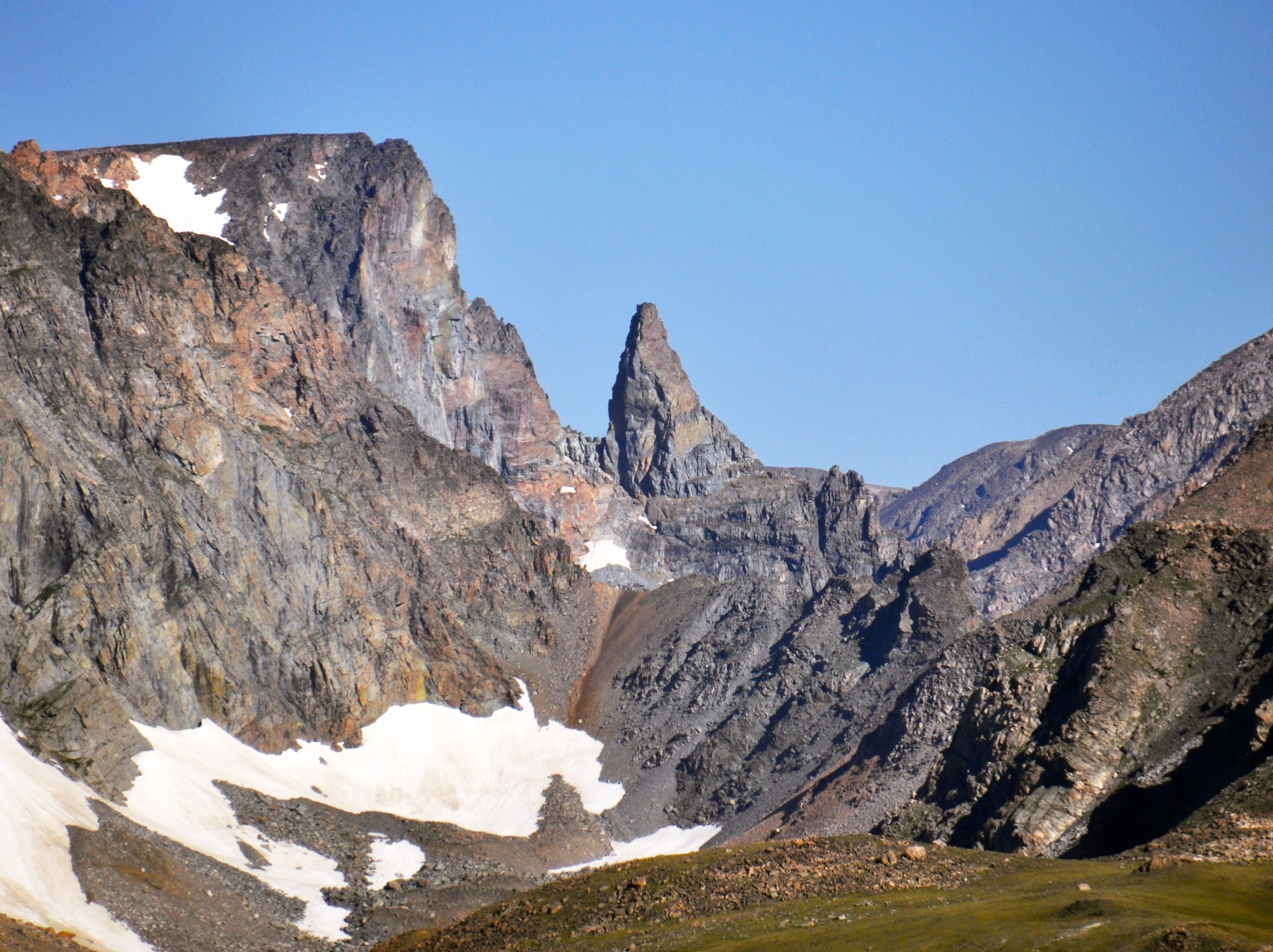
- The Bears Tooth

Highest point
- Elevation: 11,920 ft (3,630 m)
- Prominence: 315 ft (96 m)
- Coordinates: 45°03′46″N 109°33′45″W

Geography
- Location within Montana Location within the United States
- Location: Carbon County, Montana, U.S.
- Parent range: Beartooth Mountains
- Topo map: USGS Silver Run Peak

Bears Tooth (11,920 feet (3,630 m)) is a mountain spire in the Beartooth Mountains in the U.S. state of Montana. The peak is in the Absaroka-Beartooth Wilderness in Custer National Forest, and is adjacent to Beartooth Mountain. Bears Tooth is the namesake for numerous other points in the region and the Beartooth Mountains themselves. Known by the Native American Crow as "Na Piet Say", translated as bears tooth, the spire can be seen from the Beartooth Highway.
