= The Hotelier =

American indie rock band

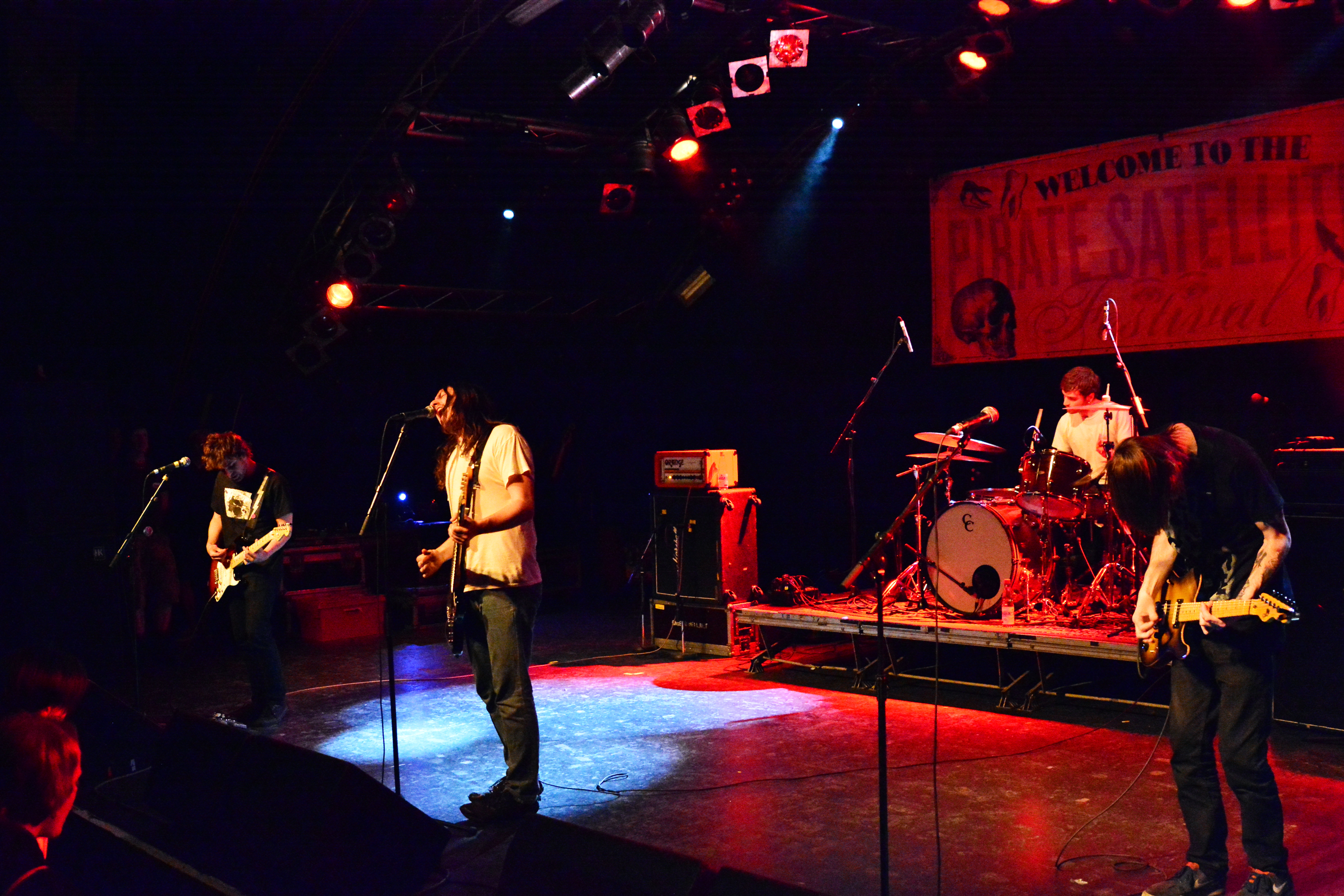
- The Hotelier at Pirate Satellite Festival Hamburg 2015

Background information
- Also known as: The Hotel Year
- Origin: Worcester, Massachusetts
- Genres: Emo; indie rock; post-hardcore; pop punk
- Years active: 2009–present
- Labels: Counter Intuitive; Tiny Engines
- Members: Christian Holden; Chris Hoffman; Sam Frederick; Ben Gauthier
- Past members: Zack Shaw; Cody Millett; Scott Ayotte
- Website: thehotelier.bandcamp.com

The Hotelier is an American indie rock band from Worcester, Massachusetts, currently signed with Dreams of Field Recordings. The band's second album, Home, Like Noplace Is There, has been featured on Spin's "The 101 Best Albums of the 2010s" list and is considered an "essential emo album" by AltPress. The group has performed at the Pirate Satellite Festival, the Pitchfork Music Festival, and the Primavera Sound festival.

== History ==
=== Early years and It Never Goes Out (2009–2014) ===
The Hotelier formed in June 2009 when lead singer Christian Holden met Chris Hoffman, Zack Shaw, and Sam Frederick while attending high school in Dudley, Massachusetts.

In 2009, the band released their first EP, titled We Are All Alone, which received little success outside of Massachusetts. In 2010, the band released Two Song Demo. In 2011, the band released their first album, titled It Never Goes Out, receiving some attention.

Originally named The Hotel Year, the band changed its name because they did not think the name was particularly good, and there was a band called My Hotel Year which they did not want to be confused with.

=== Home, Like Noplace Is There (2014–2015) ===
The band released their second album in 2014 titled Home, Like Noplace Is There, which brought the band to attention in the emo revival scene. After releasing the album, vocalist Christian Holden stated in a blog post on the bands Tumblr that "Our new album deals with some real dark stuff. So to all my brooding and slightly damaged friends, have your a happy album or Rugrats in Paris nearby. It’s partly about my experience with friends and loved ones in the past three years which were very complicated, toxic, and abusive. But laid within is a lot about the deconstruction of self for personal growth and transformation. I hope it helps you live and stuff. Apparently we are emo now." Home, Like Noplace Is There ranked at number 1 on the AbsolutePunk staff's top 30 albums of 2014, and number 6 on the users' top 50 albums of 2000-2015. According to Marc Snitzer, writer for the Philadelphia City Paper, The Hotelier was named one of two bands "leading the emo revival". The release of the band's sophomore album was ranked number seven on Alternative Press's list of the "12 Biggest Moments of The #EmoRevival in 2014". Leor Galil, writer for the Chicago Reader named it his favorite record of 2014. The band was also featured (for their second album) in a Boston Globe article highlighting the best music from Boston in 2014. The album was included at number 29 on Rock Sound's "Top 50 Albums of the Year" list.

The band was featured on Property of Zack's "Artists To Watch in 2015". The band performed at the 2015 Primavera Sound festival in Barcelona, Spain. In the spring of 2015, the band supported La Dispute and Title Fight on their co-headlining tour.

=== Goodness (2016–present) ===
On February 15, 2016, Christian Holden wrote a blog post on the band's Tumblr account in which they mentioned an impending album announcement for an album entitled Goodness. The album was formally announced the next day. At the same time the band released a trailer for the album set to the song Goodness Pt I, a song sold as a limited edition numbered vinyl during the band's 2015 tour.

The band premiered their second single titled "Soft Animal" on April 22, 2016. The album itself was released a little over a month later, on May 27, through Tiny Engines.

== Musical style ==
Simon Spreyer of AllMusic said the Hotelier's sound is "distinctly emo revival". The band's lyrical themes include gender dysphoria, police brutality, social welfare, and state failure.

== Band members ==
=== Current ===
- Christian Holden – lead vocals, bass, occasional guitar (2009–present)
- Chris Hoffman – guitar, backing vocals (2009–present)
- Ben Gauthier – guitar, backing vocals (2014–2016, 2018–present)
- Scott Ayotte – guitar (2016–2018, 2024–present)
- Justine DeFederico - guitar, backing vocals (2026–present)
- Samuel DeFederico (Frederick) – drums (2009–present)

=== Former ===
- Zack Shaw – guitar, backing vocals (2009–2012)
- Cody Millett – guitar (2012–2014)
- Jade Dmitri – guitar, backing vocals (2016)

== Discography ==
=== Studio albums ===
- It Never Goes Out (2011)
- Home, Like Noplace Is There (2014)
- Goodness (2016)

=== Extended plays ===
- We Are All Alone (2009, as The Hotel Year)
- Two Song Demo (2010, as The Hotel Year)
- Fest 12 Split (2013)
