= Beartooth Mountain =

Mountain in Montana, United States

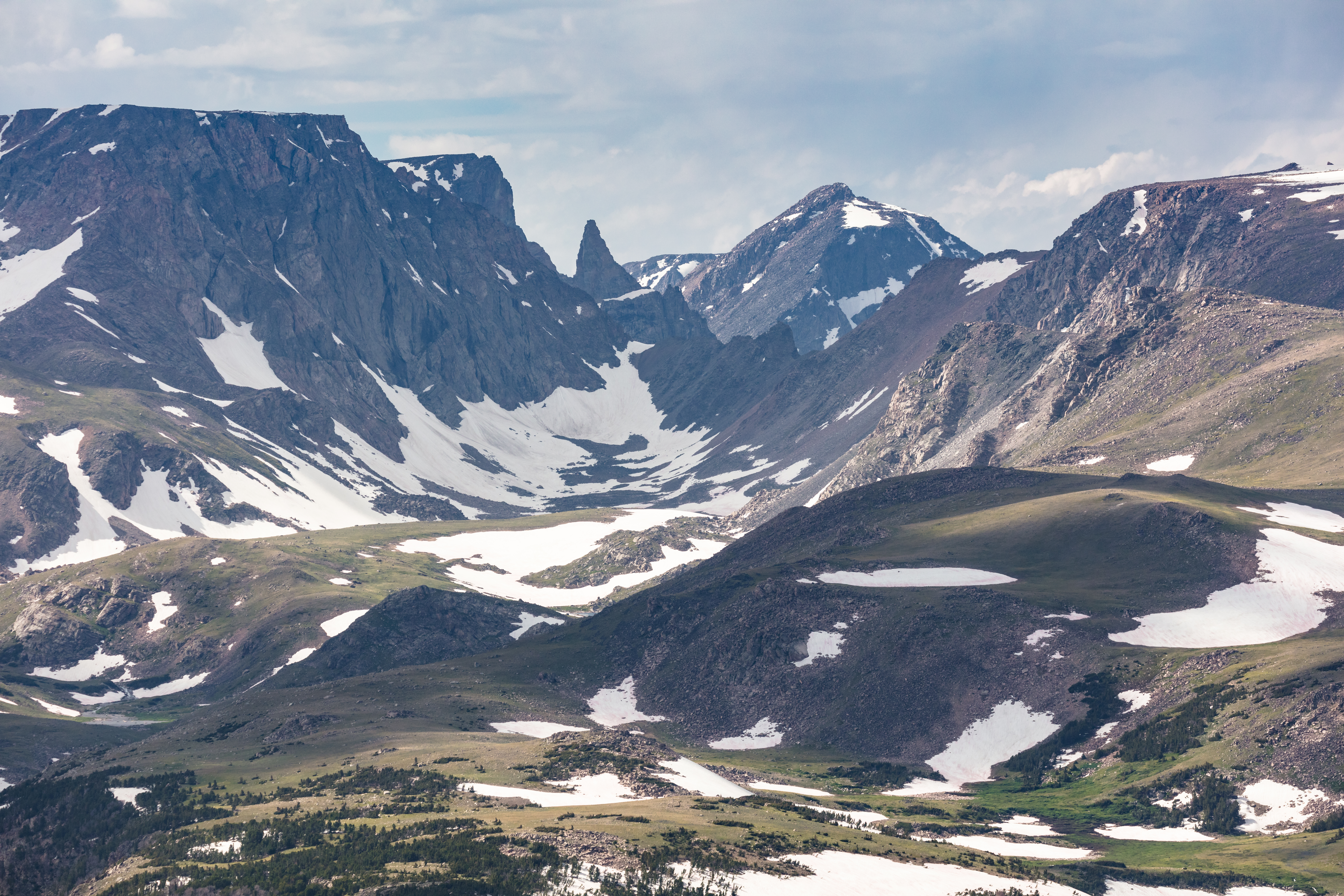

Highest point
- Elevation: 12,356 ft (3,766 m)
- Prominence: 1,471 ft (448 m)
- Coordinates: 45°03′39″N 109°34′07″W

Geography
- Location within Montana Location within the United States
- Location: Carbon County, Montana, U.S.
- Parent range: Beartooth Mountains
- Topo map: USGS Silver Run Peak

Beartooth Mountain (12,356 feet (3,766 m)) is in the Beartooth Mountains in the U.S. state of Montana. The peak is one of the tallest in the Beartooth Mountains, the 11th tallest in Montana (tied with Bowback Mountain) and is in the Absaroka-Beartooth Wilderness in Custer National Forest. Along a ridge .29 mi (0.47 km) to the northeast lies the spire known as Bears Tooth (11,920 ft (3,630 m)).
