= Tiny Engines =

Record label

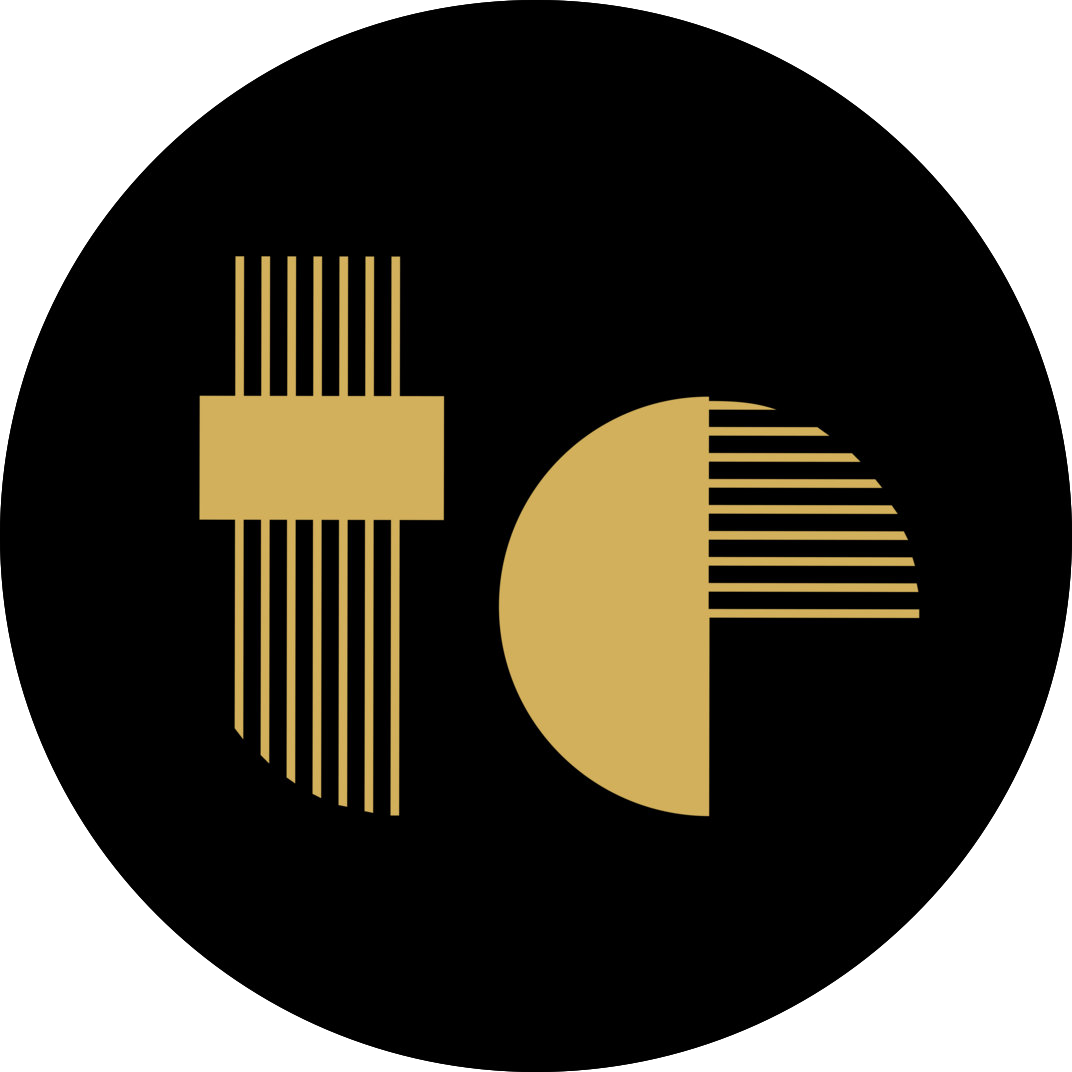
- Founded: 2008
- Founder: Chuck Daley, Will Miller
- Genre: Emo, indie rock, post-hardcore, pop punk, punk rock
- Country of origin: U.S.
- Location: The Carolinas
- Official website: www.tinyengines.net

Tiny Engines is an American record label based in the Carolinas.

== Controversy ==
In November 2019, Stevie Knipe of Adult Mom accused Tiny Engines of a breach of contract due to the delayed payment of $8,000 in royalties. Knipe claimed that Tiny Engines sent no royalty payments between 2015 and May 2018 to the band. Other artists such as Mannequin Pussy and Christian Holden claimed to have experienced similar circumstances. The co-founder of the record label, Chuck Daley, admitted to the delay of payments in an interview with Billboard.

== Current artists ==
- Adult Mom
- Alien Boy
- awakebutstillinbed
- Bewilder
- Club Night
- Eerie Gaits
- Emperor X
- Empty Country
- Faye
- floral print
- Footballhead
- Haybaby
- It Looks Sad.
- Jouska
- Kid Fears
- Long Neck
- Look Mexico
- Mannequin Pussy
- Museum Mouth
- Nanami Ozone
- Oceanator
- Onsloow
- Peaer
- Pendant
- Personal Space
- Pretty Bitter
- Restorations
- Runaway Brother
- Seedbed
- See Through Dresses
- Sinai Vessel
- Somos
- The Spirit of the Beehive
- Strange Ranger
- Summer Cannibals
- The Hotelier
- Wild Pink

== Former artists ==
- Annabel
- Beach Slang
- Best Practices
- Cattle Drums
- Cayetana
- CSTVT
- Dikembe
- Direct Effect
- Everyone Everywhere
- Frontier(s)
- Illuminati Hotties
- Jowls
- Little Big League
- Monument
- Places to Hide
- Red collar
- Run Forever
- Save Ends
- Signals Midwest
- Springtime
- State Faults
- State Lines
- Strange Relations
- Sweet John Bloom
- Thelma
- Tigers Jaw
- Truth Club
- Walleater
- Wavelets
- Weller
- Yeesh
