= The Cardboard Swords =

2010s American indie pop band

- Origin: Grand Rapids, Michigan
- Genres: Indie rock, Indie pop, Midwest emo
- Years active: 2015–2018
- Labels: Count Your Lucky Stars
- Members: Tim Barrett; Tyler DeCoeur; Jeremy Dye; Sam Padalino

The Cardboard Swords were an American indie pop rock band from Grand Rapids, Michigan.

== History ==
In early 2015, The Cardboard Swords signed to Count Your Lucky Stars Records. Not long after, they were featured on a split released by the label alongside Dowsing, Sinai Vessel, and Long Knives. In late 2015, The Cardboard Swords released their self-titled first full-length album.

== Band members ==
- Tyler DeCoeur – Vocals and Guitar
- Tim Barrett – Guitar and Vocals
- Jeremy Dye – Bass and Vocals
- Sam Padalino – Drums and Vocals

== Discography ==
Studio albums

- The Cardboard Swords (2015, Count Your Lucky Stars)
- Once More, There Is Nothing Left To Figure Out (2018, self-released)

Extended plays

- Remnants (2014, self-released)
- The Cardboard Swords on Audiotree Live (2016, Count Your Lucky Stars)
- Me / You (2020, self-released)
- More to Figure Out (2022, self-released)

Splits

- CYLS Split Series 4 (2015, Count Your Lucky Stars)
