= Count Your Lucky Stars Records =

American independent record label

- Founded: 2007
- Genre: Indie rock, emo
- Country of origin: U.S.
- Location: Fenton, Michigan
- Official website: www.cylsrecords.com

Count Your Lucky Stars Records is an American independent record label based in Fenton, Michigan. The label has released albums by bands such as Empire! Empire! (I Was a Lonely Estate), Joie De Vivre, Annabel, Moving Mountains, Benton Falls, Snowing, Into It. Over It. and CSTVT. It is involved in the emo revival movement and is run by Keith and Cathy Latinen of Empire! Empire!.

== Bands ==
=== Current ===
- Be Safe
- Bottom Bracket
- Camp Trash
- The Cardboard Swords
- Certain People I Know
- Colleen Dow
- CSTVT
- Dowsing
- Driving on City Sidewalks
- Drunk Uncle
- Empire! Empire! (I Was a Lonely Estate)
- Football, etc.
- Free Throw
- The Goalie’s Anxiety At The Penalty Kick
- The Great Albatross
- Innards
- Joie De Vivre
- Kid Brother Collective
- Kittyhawk
- Long Knives
- Mimisiku
- Mountains for Clouds
- Parting
- Recreational Drugs
- Star Funeral
- Superdown
- Thank You, I'm Sorry
- The Reptilian
- Tiny Blue Ghost
- Rika
- Two Knights
- Warren Franklin & the Founding Fathers
- Zookeeper

=== Past ===
- American Thunder Band
- Annabel
- Ape Up!
- Arrows
- Benton Falls
- Boris Smile
- Boyfriends
- Brave Bird
- Brave Captain, the Rescue
- Calculator
- Cloud Mouth
- Denison Witmer
- Dikembe
- Foxing
- Glocca Morra
- Hightide Hotel
- I Am the Branch
- Into It. Over It.
- Jet Set Sail
- Kind of Like Spitting
- Lindsay Minton
- List
- Malegoat
- Merchant Ships
- Mikey Erg
- Monument
- Moving Mountains
- Parker
- Penfold
- Pennies
- Perfect Future
- Prawn
- Pswingset
- Sinai Vessel
- Sirdidymous
- Snowing
- Victor! Fix the Sun
- Youth Pictures of Florence Henderson

== See also ==
- List of record labels
