= Prawn (band) =

American Indie rock band

- Origin: Ridgewood, New Jersey
- Genres: Indie rock, post-rock, post-hardcore
- Years active: 2008–present
- Label: Topshelf Records
- Members: Tony Clark; Jamie Houghton; Kyle Burns; Andrew Vilchez; Ryan McKenna
- Website: prawnmusic.tumblr.com

Prawn is an American indie rock band from Ridgewood, New Jersey.

== History ==
Prawn was formed in 2007. In 2011, Prawn self-released their first full-length album, You Can Just Leave It All, in 2011. The band followed up this release with their first EP titled Ships. In 2014, Prawn released their second full-length album, Kingfisher, in 2014. Later in 2014, Prawn's label Topshelf Records, alongside Count Your Lucky Stars Records, released a four way split with Prawn, Kittyhawk, Frameworks, and Droughts. In 2015, Prawn released a split with Moving Mountains. Prawn's latest album, Run, was released in 2017.

== Band members ==
- Tony Clark - vocals/guitar
- Jamie Houghton - drums
- Kyle Burns - bass guitar/guitar/vocals
- Ryan McKenna - bass guitar/guitar/vocals
- Andrew Vilchez - guitar

== Discography ==
Studio albums

- You Can Just Leave It All (2012)
- Kingfisher (2014)
- Run (2017)

EPs

- Ships (2012)
- Settled (2014)

Splits

- Droughts, Frameworks, Kittyhawk, Prawn (2014)
- Joie De Vivre / Prawn
- Moving Mountains / Prawn - Split (2015)
