= Emo =

Music genre derivative of punk rock

- Other names: Emotional hardcore; emocore
- Stylistic origins: Post-hardcore; hardcore punk; indie rock; post-punk
- Cultural origins: Mid-1980s; Washington, D.C.
- Derivative forms: Soft grunge (grungegaze)

Subgenres
- Screamo; Midwest emo; pop screamo

Fusion genres
- Emo pop; emo rap

Regional scenes
- Midwestern U.S.; New Jersey

Local scenes
- Chicago; Philadelphia; San Diego; Washington, D.C.

Other topics
- Scene; alternative rock; pop-punk; melodic hardcore; emo revival

Emo (/ˈiːmoʊ/ EE-moh) is a genre of rock music that combines musical characteristics of hardcore punk with emotional, often confessional lyrics. It emerged as a style of hardcore punk and post-hardcore from the mid-1980s Washington, D.C., hardcore scene, where it was known as emotional hardcore or emocore. The bands Rites of Spring and Embrace, among others, pioneered the genre. In the late 1980s, Maryland bands Moss Icon and the Hated adopted and reinvented this sound, putting less influence on its punk roots. In the early-to-mid 1990s, their influence led emo to be adopted by alternative rock, indie rock, and pop-punk bands, including Sunny Day Real Estate, Jawbreaker, Cap'n Jazz, Mineral, and Jimmy Eat World. By the mid-1990s, Braid, the Promise Ring, American Football, and the Get Up Kids emerged from Midwest emo, and several independent record labels began to specialize in the genre. Meanwhile, screamo, a more aggressive style of emo using screamed vocals, also emerged, pioneered by the San Diego bands Heroin and Antioch Arrow. Its derivative form pop screamo achieved mainstream success in the 2000s with bands like Hawthorne Heights, Silverstein, Story of the Year, Thursday, the Used, and Underoath.

The emo subculture signifies a specific relationship between fans and artists and certain aspects of fashion, culture, and behavior. Emo fashion includes skinny jeans, black eyeliner, tight t-shirts with band names, studded belts, and flat, straight, jet-black hair with long bangs. Since the mid-to-late 2000s, fans of emo music who dress like this are referred to as "emo kids" or "emos". The emo subculture was stereotypically associated with social alienation, sensitivity, misanthropy, introversion, and angst. Purported links to depression, self-harm, and suicide, combined with its rise in popularity in the 2000s, inspired a backlash against emo, with some bands, including My Chemical Romance and Panic! at the Disco, rejecting the emo label because of the social stigma and controversy surrounding it. There has long been controversy over which bands are labeled "emo", especially for bands that started outside traditional emo scenes; a website, Is This Band Emo?, was created to explain the classification of bands in the genre with humorous responses.

Emo and its subgenre emo pop entered mainstream culture in the early 2000s with the success of Jimmy Eat World and Dashboard Confessional, and many artists signed contracts with major record labels. Bands such as My Chemical Romance, AFI, Fall Out Boy, and The Red Jumpsuit Apparatus continued the genre's popularity into the mid-late 2000s. By the early 2010s, emo's popularity had declined, with some emo bands changing their sound and others disbanding. Meanwhile, however, a mainly underground emo revival emerged, with some bands, such as the World Is a Beautiful Place & I Am No Longer Afraid to Die and Modern Baseball, drawing on the sound and aesthetic of 1990s emo. During the late 2010s, a fusion genre called emo rap became mainstream; its most famous artists included Lil Peep, XXXTentacion, and Juice Wrld. The emo revival movement ended in the late 2010s, giving way to the more experimental "post-emo" sounds of Origami Angel, Awakebutstillinbed and Home Is Where.

== Characteristics ==
Emo originated in hardcore punk and is considered a form of post-hardcore. Early emo bands used melody and emotional or introspective lyrics and that were less structured than regular hardcore punk, differentiating them from the aggression, anger, and verse-chorus-verse structures of traditional hardcore punk. According to Ryan De Freitas of Kerrang: "Emo in the '90s was about scrappy, emotionally fuelled imperfection."

According to Chris Payne, author of Where Are Your Boys Tonight?: The Oral History of Emo's Mainstream Explosion, emo is "often more melodic, more vulnerable [than traditional hardcore] — and often really over the top. [There are also] really performative aspects in emo." Sandra Song of CNN describes emo as a "softer approach to hardcore punk, with warbly vocals and evocative lyrics that have other bands derisively calling it the sound of 'teen angst.'" Em Casalena of American Songwriter stated that the genre is characterized by an "angsty yet kind of miserable vibe".

Despite being rooted in hardcore punk, emo has also been associated with other related genres, such as alternative rock, indie rock, punk rock, and pop-punk. During the 2000s, it became common for bands to fuse emo with harder styles such as heavy metal and metalcore to varying degrees by incorporating metallic riffs, guitar solos and breakdowns into their songwriting. Bands who have released songs in this style include From First to Last, Bullet for My Valentine, Escape the Fate, Underoath and My Chemical Romance.

Andrew Sacher of Brooklyn Vegan has expressed his belief that the year 2001 was a "crossroads" of sorts for the genre, stating that "emo came in a lot of different varieties" during that year. He said: "There were bands who were still playing the style of second wave emo that was prominent in the 1990s, as well as bands beginning to define the sound of the third wave. Some bands leaned more towards post-hardcore, others more towards pop punk, others towards indie rock, and others towards softer, acoustic guitar and piano-based music." The New York Times described emo as "emotional punk or post-hardcore or pop-punk. That is, punk that wears its heart on its sleeve and tries a little tenderness to leaven its sonic attack. If it helps, imagine Ricky Nelson singing in the Sex Pistols." Author Matt Diehl called emo a "more sensitive interpolation of punk's mission".

Lyrics, a focus in emo music, are typically personal and confessional, or according to Merriam-Webster, "introspective and emotionally fraught". Themes usually deal with topics such as failed romance, self-loathing, pain, insecurity, suicidal thoughts, love, and relationships. AllMusic described emo lyrics as "usually either free-associative poetry or intimate confessionals". According to The New Grove Dictionary of Music and Musicians: "In its most basic sense, the term 'emo' is short for emotional, an indication that the music had left behind punk's heavily politicized public protest for more private and reflective concerns. Musically, this new emotional sense was best captured in the nostalgic and poetic lyrics of the Rites of Spring singer Guy Picciotto and his cracked, almost distraught, intense vocal style."

Emo guitar dynamics use both the softness and loudness of punk rock music. According to AllMusic, most 1990s emo bands "borrowed from some combination of Fugazi, Sunny Day Real Estate, and Weezer". Some emo leans toward the characteristics of progressive music with the genre's use of complex guitar work, unorthodox song structures, and extreme dynamic shifts.

== Etymology ==
Emo means different things to different people. Actually, that's a massive understatement. Emo seems to solely mean different things to different people − like pig latin or books by Thomas Pynchon, confusion is one of its hallmark traits. [...] The word has survived and flourished in three decades, two milleniums, and two Bush administrations. [...] It's older than most of its fans. It's been a source of pride, a target of derision, a mark of confusion, and a sign of the times. It's been the next big thing twice, [and] the current big thing once. And yet, not only can no one agree on what it means, [but] there is not now, nor has there ever been, a single major band that admits to being emo. Not one.

— Music critic Andy Greenwald in the book Nothing Feels Good: Punk Rock, Teenagers, and Emo. (published November 15, 2003). St. Martins Griffin. pp. 1–2.

Although the origins of the word "emo" are uncertain, evidence shows that the word "emo" was coined in the mid-1980s, specifically 1985. According to Andy Greenwald, author of Nothing Feels Good: Punk Rock, Teenagers, and Emo, "The origins of the term 'emo' are shrouded in mystery ... but it first came into common practice in 1985. If Minor Threat was hardcore, then Rites of Spring, with its altered focus, was emotional hardcore or emocore." Michael Azerrad, author of Our Band Could Be Your Life, also traces the word's origins to the mid-1980s: "The style was soon dubbed 'emo-core,' a term everyone involved bitterly detested". Steve Niles and Brian Baker, of Minor Threat and Dag Nasty, say the term "emotional hardcore" was coined by Baker during emo's formative years. Baker used the term disparagingly, referencing what he perceived as being an "ancillary" and "posturing" nature to the bands. The term was quickly adopted by Thrasher magazine. Other accounts attribute the word to an audience member at an Embrace show, who shouted as an insult that the band was "emocore". Others have said that MacKaye coined the word when he used it self-mockingly in a magazine, or that it originated with Rites of Spring. The "emocore" label quickly spread through the DC punk scene, and was associated with many bands associated with Ian MacKaye's Dischord Records. Although many of the bands rejected the term, it stayed. Jenny Toomey recalled, "The only people who used it at first were the ones that were jealous over how big and fanatical a scene it was. [Rites of Spring] existed well before the term did and they hated it. But there was this weird moment, like when people started calling music 'grunge,' where you were using the term even though you hated it."

The term "emo" has been the subject of debate and disagreement amongst artists, critics, and fans alike. Some find the label to be loosely defined with the term at times being used to describe any music that expresses emotion. "The mainstream success of emo and its related subculture caused the term to be conflated with other genres. Additionally, fans of traditional emo music have expressed distaste for the genre's expanding definition, and what they perceive as "commercialization" of the genre.

Chris Payne, author of Where Are Your Boys Tonight?: The Oral History of Emo's Mainstream Explosion, assessed: "Emo has a lot of different definitions for different people. For me, it can be like the old DIY stuff, like Cap'n Jazz [and] American Football, and then also the more popular stuff like … My Chemical Romance, Paramore and even the emo-rap stuff like Lil Peep."

Many bands labeled as emo rejected the emo label. Ian MacKaye, after an article in Thrasher magazine referring to Embrace and other Washington, D.C., bands as "emo-core", he called it "the stupidest fucking thing I've ever heard in my entire life" during a live performance. Sunny Day Real Estate's members said they consider themselves simply a rock band, and said that back in the early days, the word "emocore" was an insult: "While I don't disrespect anyone for using the term emo-core, or rock, or anything, but back in the day, emo-core was just about the worst dis that you could throw on a band."

In Chris Payne's book Where Are Your Boys Tonight? (2023), Bayside vocalist Anthony Raneri stated that he believed emo became "a dirty word" around the time of its mainstream success in the 2000s. He explains this derogatory use of the word derived from hipsters adopting the term to demean rock artists they saw as being "not as cool as" the popular indie rock groups of the time, namely the Strokes. My Chemical Romance singer Gerard Way said in 2007 that emo is "a pile of shit [...] I think there are bands that we get lumped in with that are considered emo and, by default, that starts to make us emo. All I can say is that anyone actually listening to the records, putting the records next to each other and listening to them, [would know there are] actually no similarities." Additionally, Quinn Villarreal of SiriusXM stated that "having 'feelings' in the 2000s and 2010s wasn't 'cool.' So, the term 'emo' became a pejorative, which is why it's oftentimes rejected by bands and fans."

Brendon Urie of Panic! at the Disco said : "It's ignorant! The stereotype is guys that are weak and have failing relationships write about how sad they are. If you listen to our songs, not one of them has that tone." Adam Lazzara of Taking Back Sunday said he always considered his band rock and roll instead of emo. Guitarist of the Get Up Kids, Jim Suptic, noted the differences between the 2000s mainstream acts when compared to the emo bands of the 1990s, saying, "The punk scene we came out of and the punk scene now are completely different. It's like glam rock now. We played the Bamboozle fests this year and we felt really out of place... If this is the world we helped create, then I apologise." Vocalist of AFI, Davey Havok, described emo as "such a strange and meaningless word". Early emo musicians also have rejected the label. Guy Picciotto, the vocalist of Rites of Spring, said he considers the emo label "retarded" and always considered Rites of Spring a punk rock band: "The reason I think it's so stupid is that – what, like the Bad Brains weren't emotional? What – they were robots or something? It just doesn't make any sense to me."

The term "mall emo" has been used to separate mainstream bands like Paramore, Hawthorne Heights, My Chemical Romance, Panic! at the Disco, and Fall Out Boy from the less commercially viable bands that proceeded and succeeded them. The term "mall emo" dates back to around 2002, when many emo fans did not like the change emo was going through at the time when the genre became mainstream.

Tom Mullen, editor of the Anthology of Emo book, created the website Washed Up Emo in 2007 in response to the mainstream perceptions of the genre, intending to impart information about the genre's history. He later created the website Is This Band Emo? in 2014, which explains whether various bands are classified under the genre alongside humorous responses.

== History ==
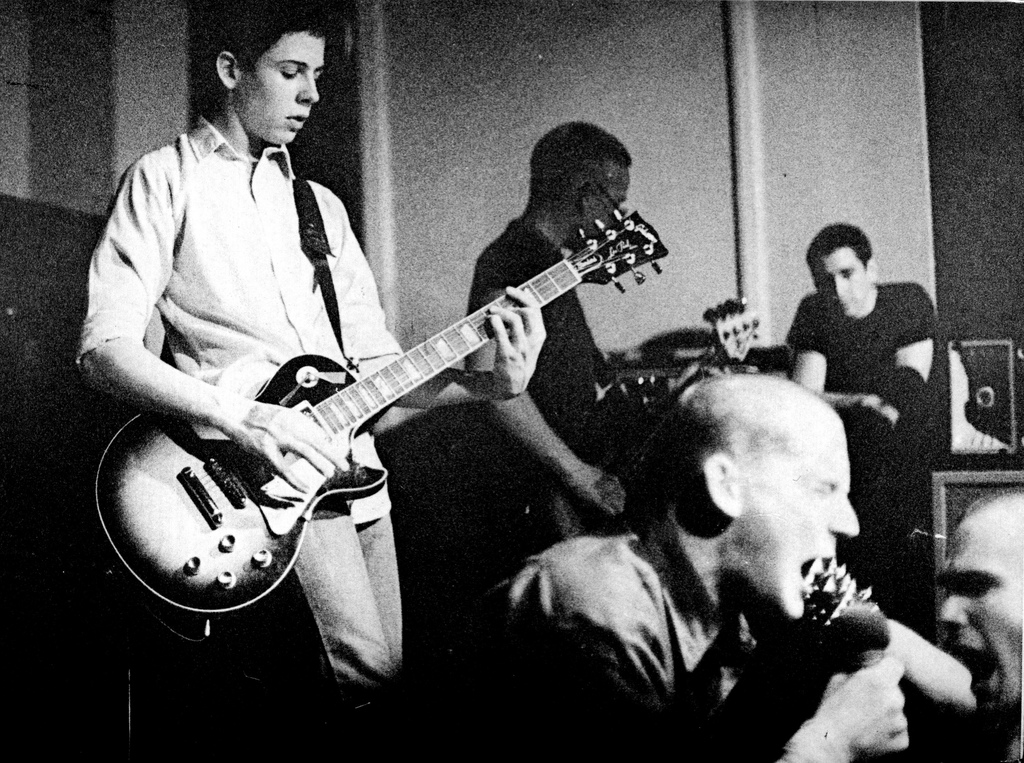
Hardcore punk band Minor Threat in 1981

=== Predecessors ===
From the late 1970s through the early 1980s, the Washington, D.C., hardcore scene was thriving. By 1984, the scene was awash in violence: racist skinheads came to hardcore punk concerts in the city to fight; shows devolved into vandalism; and many participants in the scene developed an ethos of toxic masculinity. When the Faith put out the EP Subject to Change in 1983, it marked a critical evolution in the sound of D.C. hardcore and punk music in general. AllMusic writer Steve Huey described their music as "hint[ing] at what was to come, softening the standard-issue hardcore approach somewhat with better-developed melodies and a more inward-looking perspective" Marginal Man's emotional performance style too laid the groundwork for emo. This is particularly prominent in their song "Forever Gone", about the suicide of guitarist Pete Murray's friend. The band eventually removed this song from their setlists due to the emotional impact it would have on Murray, leaving him unable to finish the set, on one occasion even fainting during the song's performance.

According to music writer Luke Britton, "it's generally accepted that the genre's pioneers" came in the late 1980s. During the decade, many hardcore punk and post-hardcore bands formed in Washington, D.C. Post-hardcore, an experimental offshoot of hardcore punk, was inspired by post-punk. Hardcore punk bands and post-hardcore bands who influenced early emo bands include Minor Threat, Black Flag and Hüsker Dü.

=== 1984–1991: Origins and emotional hardcore ===
The one fact that no one seems to debate − or at least debate that loudly − is that emo emerged from hardcore.

— Music critic Andy Greenwald, in the book Nothing Feels Good: Punk Rock, Teenagers, and Emo (2003)

Emo, which began as a post-hardcore subgenre, was part of the 1980s hardcore punk scene in Washington, D.C., as something different from the violent part of the Washington, D.C., hardcore scene. Rites of Spring formed in 1983, using the musical style of hardcore punk and combining the musical style with melodic guitars, varied rhythms, and personal, emotional lyrics. Many of the band's themes, including nostalgia, romantic bitterness and poetic desperation, became familiar tropes of later emo music. Its performances were public, emotional purges where audience members sometimes wept. Ian MacKaye of Minor Threat became a Rites of Spring fan (recording their only album and being their roadie) and formed the emo band Embrace, which explored similar themes of self-searching and emotional release. Similar bands followed in connection with the "Revolution Summer" of 1985, an attempt by members of the Washington scene to break from the usual characteristics of hardcore punk to a hardcore punk style with different characteristics. Bands such as Gray Matter, Beefeater, Fire Party, Dag Nasty, and Soulside were associated with the movement.

"Remainder" by Rites of Spring (1985)
The melodic guitars, varied rhythms and personal lyrics of Rites of Spring changed the hardcore punk scene and helped launch the "emotional hardcore" or "emocore" style in the 1980s.

The Washington, D.C., emo scene lasted only a few years, and by 1986, most of emo's major bands (including Rites of Spring, Embrace, Gray Matter and Beefeater) had broken up. However, its ideas and aesthetics spread quickly across the country through a network of homemade zines, vinyl records and hearsay. According to Greenwald, the Washington, D.C., scene laid the groundwork for emo's subsequent incarnations:

What had happened in D.C. in the mid-eighties—the shift from anger to action, from extroverted rage to internal turmoil, from an individualized mass to a mass of individuals—was in many ways a test case for the transformation of the national punk scene over the next two decades. The imagery, the power of the music, the way people responded to it, and the way the bands burned out instead of fading away—all have their origins in those first few performances by Rites of Spring. The roots of emo were laid, however unintentionally, by fifty or so people in the nation's capital. And in some ways, it was never as good and surely never as pure again. Certainly, the Washington scene was the only time "emocore" had any consensus definition as a genre.

Maryland bands Moss Icon and the Hated formed at the tail end of Revolution Summer. Unlike previous emo bands, Moss Icon's music often disregarded the conventional rhythms and drive of punk. This is the point at which some music historians draw the distinction between "emo-core" and simply "emo", with Journalist D.I. Kravchek calling Moss Icon and the Hated the pioneers of emo, as opposed to emocore. Subsequently, the sound of emo spread through a number of separate scenes that although being disparate, were also intertwined.

=== 1991–1994: Reinvention ===
As the Washington, D.C., emo movement spread across the United States, local bands began to emulate its style. Emo combined the fatalism, theatricality and isolation of the Smiths with hardcore punk's uncompromising, dramatic worldview. Despite the number of bands and the variety of locales, emocore's late-1980s aesthetics remained more-or-less the same: "over-the-top lyrics about feelings wedded to dramatic but decidedly punk music." During the early–mid 1990s, several new bands reinvented emo.

Around 1990, a number of bands began pushing the sound of early emo into more extreme and chaotic territory. San Diego's Heroin is the band generally cited as either pioneering or being the band that inspired the earliest acts in screamo, one segment of this more extreme wave. This became a popular style in their city, with other acts including Antioch Arrow and Swing Kids, which led to their style sometimes being called the "San Diego sound". The most influential acts were those signed to Gravity Records, a label founded in 1991 by Matt Anderson, a member of Heroin, as a means to release the music of his band and of other related San Diego groups. In a 2024 interview, Aaron Montaigne of Heroin and Antioch Arrow, credited the bands' influence largely as coming from Revolution Summer bands, in addition to the Birthday Party and that their vocal style was inspired by San Francisco emo band Fuel. Gravity Records also featured releases by non-San Diego bands including Mohinder (from Cupertino, California) and Angel Hair (from Boulder, Colorado), who were also labelled with the San Diego sound.

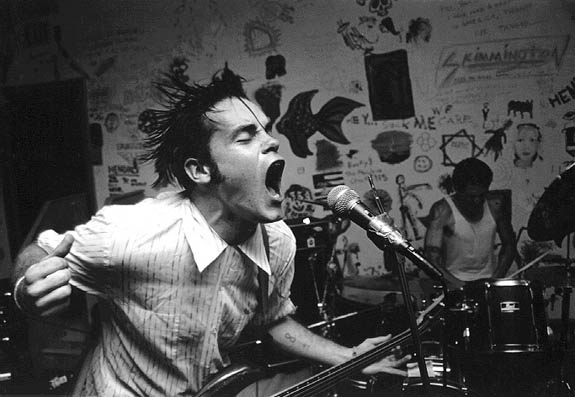
Still Life performing in 1996

Gravity Records bands were closely related to the scenes based on Paramus' Gern Blandsten Records and Santa Barbara County's Ebullition Records. On those labels, styles similar to the San Diego sound were produced by Downcast, Born Against, Rorschach, Econochrist, 1.6 Band and Merel. The influence of these three labels initiated a wave of bands that Zap magazine called "Gravity-core" in 1991, including Chino Horde, Policy of 3, Native Nod and Still Life. This was particularly prevalent in San Francisco Bay Area, beginning when Cory Linstrum of End of the Line moved there from San Diego in 1991. Linstrum formed John Henry West with Fuel guitarist Sarah Kirsch. Alongside Downcast from Santa Barbara and Manumission from Goleta, the band occupied a state-wide space, equally playing San Diego's Ché Café, Hollywood's Macondo, Isla Vista's the Red Barn and Berkley's 924 Gilman Street. These bands helped to define a more hardcore-leaning and often metal-influenced strand of emo, that came to be called "hardcore emo".

In the wake of the 1991 success of Nirvana's Nevermind and the associated rise of grunge, underground music and subcultures were widely noticed in the United States, with record labels seeking tofind the next big rock subgenre. New distribution networks emerged, touring routes were codified, and regional and independent acts accessed the national stage. Young people across the country became fans of independent music, and punk culture became mainstream. Sunny Day Real Estate formed in Seattle at the height of the early 1990s grunge boom, which was also primarily associated with that city. The music video for "Seven", lead track of the band's debut album Diary (1994), was played on MTV, giving the band more attention. Alongside Seaweed, they helped to define a sound merging emo with grunge.

"Kiss the Bottle" by Jawbreaker (1992)
"Kiss the Bottle" is considered one of Jawbreaker's definitive and most-appreciated songs.

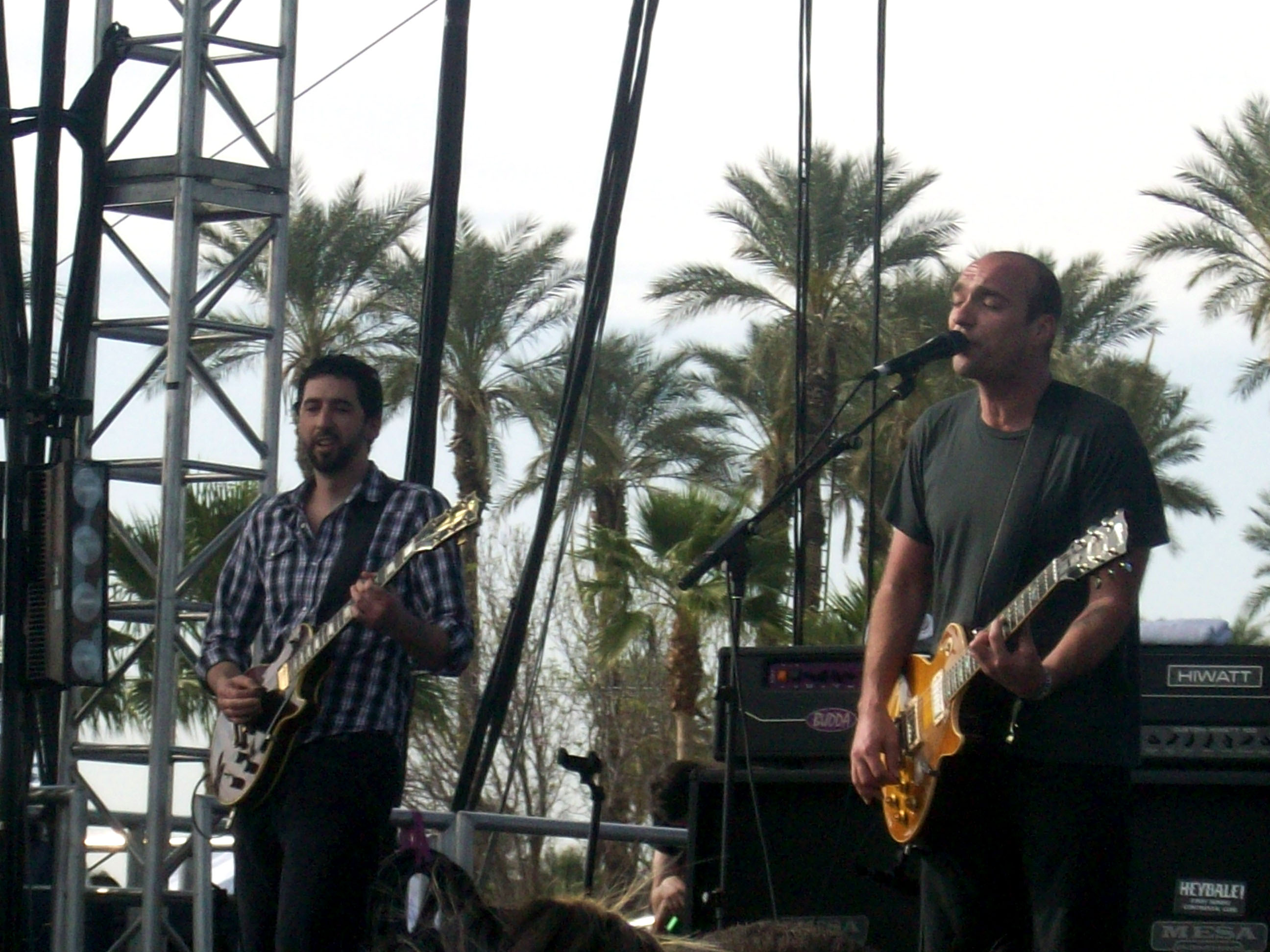
Sunny Day Real Estate performing in 2010

Pioneers of emo pop, Samiam and Jawbreaker were early examples of the fusion of emo with pop-punk and signed major record labels in the following year following the success of Green Day's Dookie (1994). The Ringer named Samiam's song "Tired of Waiting" (1990) and Jawbreaker's "Chesterfield King" (1992) as "the most important emo song" of their respective year. Jawbreaker vocalist Blake Schwarzenbach focused his lyrics on personal, immediate topics often taken from his journal. Often obscure and cloaked in metaphors, their relationship to Schwarzenbach's concerns gave his words a bitterness and frustration which made them universal and attractive to audiences. Schwarzenbach became emo's first idol, as listeners related to the singer even more than to his songs. Jawbreaker's 1994 album, 24 Hour Revenge Therapy, was popular with fans and is a touchstone of mid-1990s emo. Although Jawbreaker signed with Geffen Records and toured with mainstream bands Nirvana and Green Day, Jawbreaker's 1995 album Dear You did not achieve mainstream success. Jawbreaker broke up soon afterwards, with Schwarzenbach forming emo band Jets to Brazil.

=== 1994–2001: Second-wave ===
==== 1994–1997: Underground popularity ====
The American punk and indie rock movements, which had been largely underground since the early 1980s, became part of mainstream culture during the mid-1990s. With Nirvana's success, major record labels capitalized on the popularity of alternative rock and other underground music by signing and promoting independent bands.

In 1994, the same year that Jawbreaker's 24 Hour Revenge Therapy and Sunny Day Real Estate's Diary were released, punk rock bands Green Day and the Offspring broke into the mainstream with diamond album Dookie and multi-platinum album Smash, respectively. After underground music went mainstream, emo retreated and reformed as a national subculture over the next few years. A number of emo bands emerged in the underground around this time, the most famous of which was the Arizona band Jimmy Eat World, which issued its debut album in 1994 and was influenced by pop punk bands such as the Mr. T Experience and Horace Pinker. Jimmy Eat World released its self-titled debut album in 1994. As they rose to fame, Jimmy Eat World toured with a number of peer bands, including Mineral, another key group during this era with a more melodic sound. California's Weezer is another band sometimes considered to be emo which rose to fame during this period, though Weezer's membership in the emo genre is debated.

Inspired by Jawbreaker, Drive Like Jehu and Fugazi, 1990s emo abandoned the elements of hardcore punk and used elements of indie rock, with punk rock's do-it-yourself work ethic but smoother songs and emotional vocals. According to Theo Cateforis of Grove Music Dictionary: "These groups portrayed a sense of emotional volatility in their music by using extended song forms that oscillated between straight and double time and clean guitar timbres and bursts of distortion. Vocalists deliberately avoided punk's shouted style and sang melodic lines in a breathy head voice, often straining at the top of their range, which contributed to the music's sense of emotional urgency."

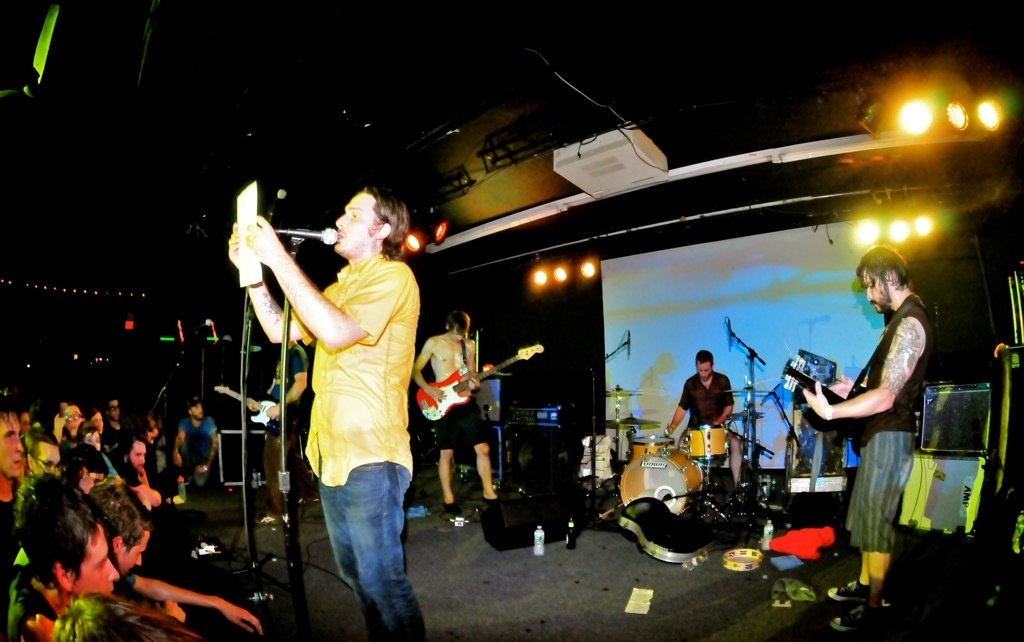
Cap'n Jazz live in 2010

Many 1990s emo bands, such as Cap'n Jazz, Braid, Christie Front Drive, Mineral, Jimmy Eat World, the Get Up Kids and the Promise Ring, originated in the central U.S. Many of the bands had a distinct vocal style and guitar melodies, which was later called Midwest emo. According to Andy Greenwald, "this was the period when emo earned many, if not all, of the stereotypes that have lasted to this day: boy-driven, glasses-wearing, overly sensitive, overly brainy, chiming-guitar-driven college music." Emo band Texas Is the Reason bridged the gap between indie rock and emo in their three-year lifespan on the East Coast, melding Sunny Day Real Estate's melodies and punk musicianship and singing directly to the listener. In New Jersey, the band Lifetime played shows in fans' basements. Lifetime's 1995 album, Hello Bastards on Jade Tree Records, fused hardcore punk with emo and eschewed cynicism and irony in favor of love songs. The album sold tens of thousands of copies, and Lifetime paved the way for New Jersey and Long Island emo bands Brand New, Midtown, the Movielife, My Chemical Romance, Saves the Day, Senses Fail, Taking Back Sunday and Thursday.

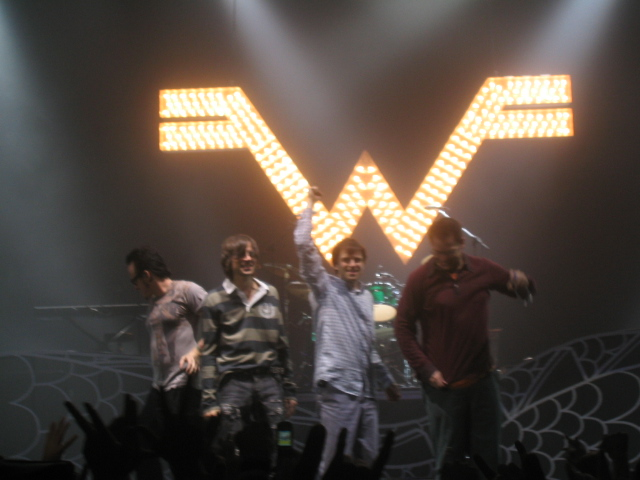
The band Weezer (pictured) released the album Pinkerton, an album that was originally a critical and commercial failure. Nonetheless, Pinkerton is considered one of the most important 1990s emo albums.

The Promise Ring's music took a slower, smoother, pop-punk approach to riffs, blending them with singer Davey von Bohlen's imagist lyrics delivered in a froggy croon and pronounced lisp and playing shows in basements and VFW halls. Jade Tree released their debut album, 30° Everywhere, in 1996; it sold tens of thousands of copies and was successful by independent standards. Greenwald describes the album as "like being hit in the head with cotton candy". Other bands, such as Karate, the Van Pelt, Joan of Arc and the Shyness Clinic, played emo music with post-rock and noise rock influences. Their common lyrical thread was "applying big questions to small scenarios". A cornerstone of mid-1990s emo was Weezer's 1996 album, Pinkerton. After the mainstream success of Weezer's self-titled debut album, Pinkerton showed a more dark and abrasive style. Frontman Rivers Cuomo's songs focused on messy, manipulative sex and his insecurity about dealing with celebrity. A critical and commercial failure, Rolling Stone called it the third-worst album of the year. Cuomo retreated from the public eye, later referring to the album as "hideous" and "a hugely painful mistake". However, Pinkerton found enduring appeal with young people who were discovering alternative rock and identified with its confessional lyrics and theme of rejection. Sales grew steadily due to word of mouth, online message boards and Napster. "Although no one was paying attention", writes Greenwald, "perhaps because no one was paying attention—Pinkerton became the most important emo album of the decade." In 2004, James Montgomery of MTV described Weezer as "the most important band of the last 10 years". Pinkerton's success grew very gradually, being certified gold by the RIAA in July 2001 and eventually being certified platinum by the RIAA in September 2016.

"If I Could" by Mineral (1997)
Andy Greenwald calls "If I Could" "the ultimate expression" of 1990s emo.

1990s emo was embodied by Mineral, whose The Power of Failing (1997) and EndSerenading (1998) encapsulated emo tropes: somber music, accompanied by a shy narrator singing seriously about mundane problems. Greenwald calls "If I Could" "the ultimate expression" of 1990s emo, writing that "the song's short synopsis—she is beautiful, I am weak, dumb, and shy; I am alone but am surprisingly poetic when left alone — sums up everything that emo's adherents admired and its detractors detested." Another significant band was Braid, whose 1998 album Frame and Canvas and B-side song "Forever Got Shorter" blurred the line between band and listener; the group mirrored their audience in passion and sentiment, and sang in their fans' voice.

"Why Did We Ever Meet" by The Promise Ring (1997)
The Promise Ring's Nothing Feels Good achieved wide success with an effective blend of pop and punk.

Although mid-1990s emo had thousands of young fans, it did not enter the national consciousness. A few bands were offered contracts with major record labels, but most broke up before they could capitalize on the opportunity. Jimmy Eat World signed to Capitol Records in 1995 and developed a following with their album, Static Prevails, but did not break into the mainstream yet. The Promise Ring were the most commercially successful emo band of the time, with sales of their 1997 album Nothing Feels Good reaching the mid-five figures. Greenwald calls the album "the pinnacle of its generation of emo: a convergence of pop and punk, of resignation and celebration, of the lure of girlfriends and the pull of friends, bandmates, and the road"; mid-1990s emo was "the last subculture made of vinyl and paper instead of plastic and megabytes".

==== 1997–2001: Independent success ====
Emo's popularity grew during the late 1990s, laying the foundation for mainstream success. Deep Elm Records released a series of eleven compilation albums, The Emo Diaries, from 1997 to 2007. Emphasizing unreleased music from many bands, the series included Jimmy Eat World, Further Seems Forever, Samiam and the Movielife. Jimmy Eat World's 1999 album, Clarity, was a touchstone for later emo bands. In 2003, Andy Greenwald called Clarity "one of the most fiercely beloved rock 'n' roll records of the last decade". Despite a warm critical reception and the promotion of "Lucky Denver Mint" in the Drew Barrymore comedy Never Been Kissed, Clarity was commercially unsuccessful. Nevertheless, the album had steady word-of-mouth popularity and eventually sold over 70,000 copies. Jimmy Eat World self-financed their next album, Bleed American (2001), before signing with DreamWorks Records. The album sold 30,000 copies in its first week, went gold shortly afterwards and went platinum in 2002, making emo become mainstream. Drive-Thru Records developed a roster of primarily pop-punk bands with emo characteristics, including Midtown, the Starting Line, the Movielife and Something Corporate. Drive-Thru's partnership with MCA Records enabled its brand of emo-inflected pop to reach a wider audience. Drive-Thru's unabashedly populist, capitalist approach to music allowed its bands' albums and merchandise to sell in stores such as Hot Topic.

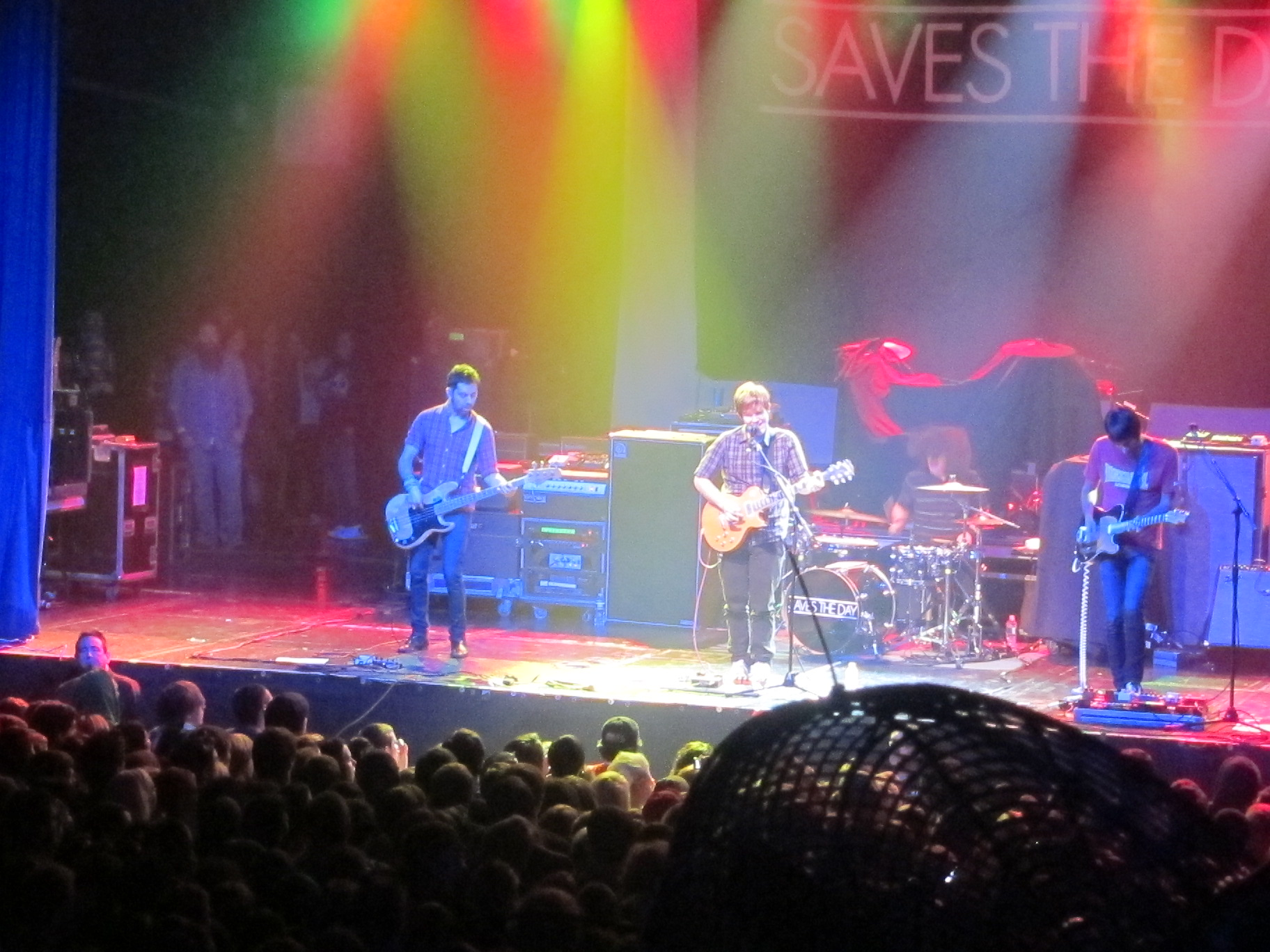
Saves the Day was one of the more successful emo bands during the late 1990s and early 2000s, when emo was still primarily underground.

Independent label Vagrant Records signed several successful late-1990s and early-2000s emo bands. The Get Up Kids had sold over 15,000 copies of their debut album, Four Minute Mile (1997), before signing with Vagrant. The label promoted them aggressively, sending them on tours opening for Green Day and Weezer. Their 1999 album, Something to Write Home About, reaching number 31 on Billboard's Top Heatseekers chart. Vagrant signed and recorded a number of other emo-related bands over the next two years, including the Anniversary, Reggie and the Full Effect, the New Amsterdams, Alkaline Trio, Saves the Day, Dashboard Confessional, Hey Mercedes and Hot Rod Circuit. Saves the Day had developed a substantial East Coast following and sold almost 50,000 copies of their second album, Through Being Cool (1999), before signing with Vagrant and releasing Stay What You Are (2001). Stay What You Are sold 15,000 copies in its first week, reached number 100 on the Billboard 200 and sold at least 120,000 copies in the United States. Vagrant organized a national tour with every band on its label, sponsored by corporations including Microsoft and Coca-Cola, during the summer of 2001. Its populist approach and use of the internet as a marketing tool made it one of the country's most-successful independent labels and helped popularize the word "emo". According to Greenwald, "More than any other event, it was Vagrant America that defined emo to masses—mainly because it had the gumption to hit the road and bring it to them." During this period, emo was often presented by the media as an alternative to nu metal acts like Limp Bizkit and Korn.

=== 2001–2010 Third-wave ===
==== 2001–2004: Mainstream breakthrough ====
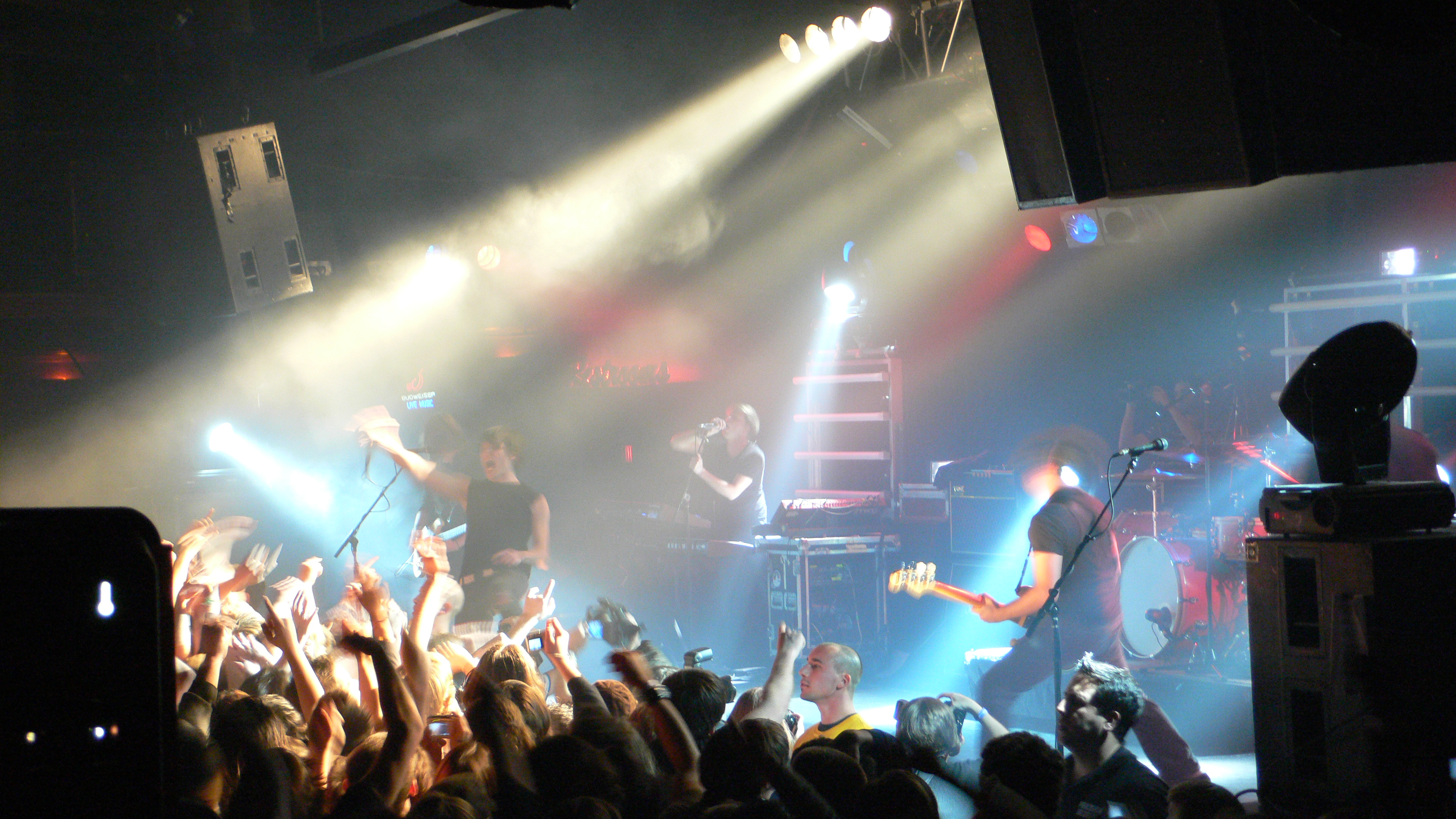
The emo band Thursday performing live in 2006

A darker, more aggressive style of emo emerged in the early 2000s. New Jersey–based Thursday signed a multimillion-dollar, multi-album contract with Island Def Jam after their 2001 album, Full Collapse, reached number 178 on the Billboard 200. Their music was more political and lacked pop hooks and anthems, influenced instead by the Smiths, Joy Division, and the Cure. However, the band's accessibility, basement-show roots and touring with Saves the Day made them part of the emo movement. Thursday's 2003 album, War All the Time, reached number seven on the Billboard 200. Hawthorne Heights, Story of the Year, Underoath, and Alexisonfire, four bands frequently featured on MTV, have popularized pop screamo. Other bands in the style include Silverstein, Senses Fail and Funeral for a Friend. Underoath's albums They're Only Chasing Safety (2004) and Define the Great Line (2006) both were certified gold by the RIAA. The Used's self-titled album (2002) was certified gold by the RIAA on July 21, 2003, and platinum by the RIAA on February 28, 2019. The Used's self-titled album, as of August 22, 2009, sold 841,000 copies. The Used's album In Love and Death (2004) was certified gold by the RIAA on March 21, 2005, and platinum by the RIAA on February 28, 2019. In Love and Death, as of January 2, 2007, sold 689,000 copies in the United States, according to Nielsen SoundScan. Four Alexisonfire albums were certified gold or platinum in Canada.

"The Middle" by Jimmy Eat World (2001)
"The Middle" topped Billboard's Modern Rock Tracks chart and helped Bleed American to go platinum.

Emo broke into the mainstream media during the summer of 2002. During this time, many fans of emo music had an appearance of short, dyed black hair with bangs cut high on the forehead, glasses with thick and black frames, and thrift store clothes. This fashion then became a huge part of emo's identity. Jimmy Eat World's Bleed American album went platinum on the strength of "The Middle", which topped Billboard's Alternative Songs chart. The mainstream success achieved by Jimmy Eat World paved the way for emo pop music that would appear during the rest of the 2000s, with emo pop becoming a very common style of emo music during the 2000s.

The band Dashboard Confessional also broke into the mainstream. Started by the band's guitarist and lead vocalist Chris Carrabba, Dashboard Confessional are known for sometimes creating acoustic songs. Dashboard Confessional originally was a side project, as Carrabba was also a member of the emo band Further Seems Forever, and Vacant Andys, a punk rock band Carraba helped start in 1995. Dashboard Confessional's album The Places You Have Come to Fear the Most peaked at number 5 on the Independent Albums chart. Dashboard Confessional was the first non-platinum-selling artist to record an episode of MTV Unplugged. The 2002 resulting live album and video long-form was certified platinum by the RIAA on May 22, 2003, topped the Independent Albums chart, and, as of October 19, 2007, sold 316,000 copies. With Dashboard Confessional's mainstream success, Carrabba appeared on a cover of the magazine Spin and according to Jim DeRogatis, "has become the 'face of emo' the way that Moby was deemed the prime exponent of techno or Kurt Cobain became the unwilling crown prince of grunge." Three of Dashboard Confessional's studio albums, The Places You Have Come to Fear the Most (2001), A Mark, a Mission, a Brand, a Scar (2003), and Dusk and Summer (2006), all were certified gold by the RIAA during the mid-2000s. As of October 19, 2007, The Places You Have Come to Fear the Most has sold 599,000 copies. As of October 19, 2007, Dusk and Summer and A Mark, a Mission, a Brand, a Scar have sold 512,000 copies and 901,000 copies in the United States, respectively. As of October 19, 2007, Dashboard Confessional's 2000 debut album The Swiss Army Romance sold 338,000 copies. On August 10, 2003, The New York Times reported how, "from the three-chord laments of Alkaline Trio to the folky rants of Bright Eyes, from the erudite pop-punk of Brand New" to the entropic anthems of Thursday, much of the most exciting rock music" was appearing from the emo genre.

Brand New also became an influential band in the emo scene in 2003 upon release of their second album Deja Entendu, garnering commercial success as well as critical acclaim for their musical innovation within the genre, bringing in indie rock influences. Its two singles "The Quiet Things That No One Ever Knows" and "Sic Transit Gloria... Glory Fades" both entered the top 40 on the UK singles chart and Deja Entendu was eventually certified gold in the US on May 3, 2007. Shortly after the release of the album, Brand New toured with Blink-182 and Incubus, playing in large arenas in Australia and the UK, respectively.

Saves the Day toured with Green Day, Blink-182 and Weezer, playing in large arenas such as Madison Square Garden. Saves the Day performed on Late Night with Conan O'Brien, appeared on the cover of Alternative Press and had music videos for "At Your Funeral" and "Freakish" in rotation on MTV2. Taking Back Sunday released their debut album, Tell All Your Friends, on Victory Records in 2002. The album gave the band a taste of success in the emo scene with singles such as "Cute Without the 'E' (Cut from the Team)" and "You're So Last Summer". Tell All Your Friends was eventually certified platinum by the RIAA in 2023 and is considered one of emo's most-influential albums. As of May 8, 2009, Tell All Your Friends sold 790,000 copies. Articles on Vagrant Records appeared in Time and Newsweek, and the word "emo" became a catchall term for non-mainstream pop music.

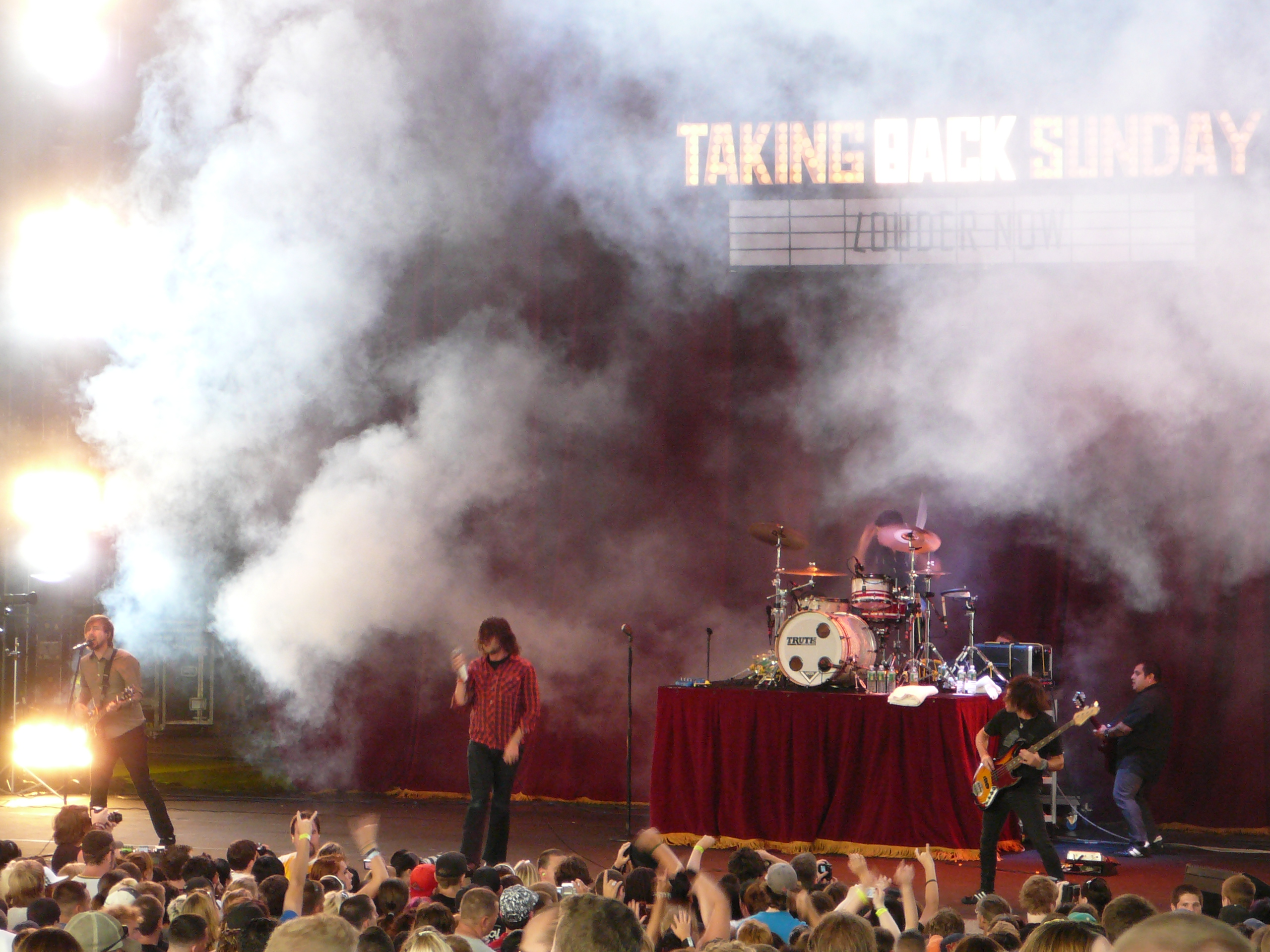
Taking Back Sunday performing on August 24, 2007

In the wake of this success, many emo bands were signed to major record labels and the genre became marketable. According to DreamWorks Records senior A&R representative Luke Wood, "The industry really does look at emo as the new rap rock, or the new grunge. I don't think that anyone is listening to the music that's being made—they're thinking of how they're going to take advantage of the sound's popularity at retail."

Taking Back Sunday had continued success in the next few years, with their 2004 album Where You Want To Be both reaching number three on the Billboard 200 and being certified gold by the RIAA in July 2005. The album, as of February 17, 2006, sold more than 700,000 copies in the United States, according to Nielsen SoundScan. The band's 2006 album, Louder Now, reached number two on the Billboard 200, was certified gold by the RIAA a little less than two months after its release date, and, as of May 8, 2009, sold 674,000 copies. Brand New also continued their commercial and critical success in the next few years with their 2006 album The Devil And God Are Raging Inside Me, which was certified gold in the United States and is widely considered by music critics as one of the best and most influential emo albums of all time. Many critics have also referred to The Devil And God Are Raging Inside Me as one of the best albums of the 2000s decade, positively comparing Brand New's lyricism and musicianship to Radiohead.

==== 2004–2010: Mainstream dominance ====
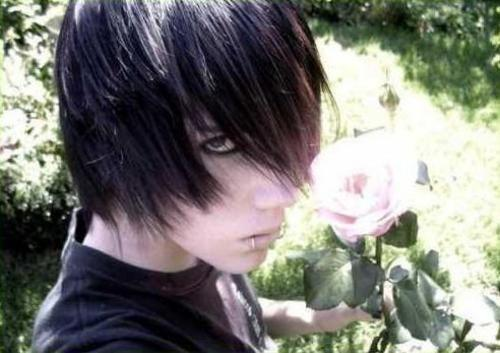
The typical mid-late 2000s emo hairstyle

Emo pop, a pop punk-oriented subgenre of emo with pop-influenced hooks, became the main emo style during the mid-to late 2000s, with many of these bands being signed by Fueled by Ramen Records and some adopting a goth-inspired look. My Chemical Romance broke into the mainstream with their 2004 album Three Cheers for Sweet Revenge. My Chemical Romance is known for their goth-influenced emo appearance and creation of concept albums and rock operas. Three Cheers for Sweet Revenge was certified platinum by the RIAA in 2005 just over a year after its release, eventually being certified triple platinum by the RIAA in 2017. The band's success continued with its third album, The Black Parade, which sold 240,000 copies in its first week of release was certified platinum by the RIAA in less than a year after its release, eventually being certified quadruple platinum by the RIAA in 2023.

Emo pop's apolitical nature, catchy music and accessible themes had broad appeal for a young, mainstream audience. Emo bands that emerged or broke into the mainstream during this time were rejected by many fans of older emo music. As emo continued to be mainstream, it became quite common for emo bands and fans to have black hair and wear eyeliner. Emo had become a full-blown subculture during this time, with many emo teens using early social media sites such as Myspace.

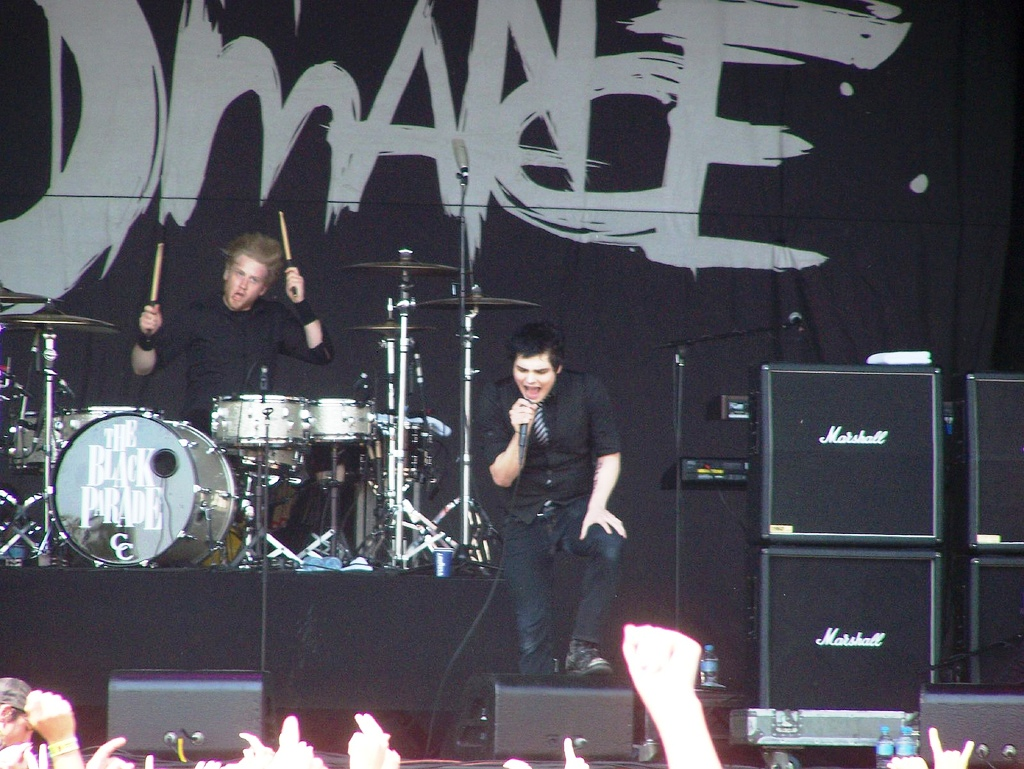
My Chemical Romance is known for their use of eyeliner and black clothing associated with emo fashion.

Fall Out Boy's album, From Under the Cork Tree, sold 2,700,000 copies in the United States by February 2013 and was eventually certified five-times platinum. The band's album, Infinity on High, topped the Billboard 200, sold 260,000 copies in its first week of release and sold 1,400,000 copies in the United States. Multiple Fall Out Boy songs reached the top ten of the Billboard Hot 100. Panic! at the Disco's album, A Fever You Can't Sweat Out, was certified quadruple platinum by the RIAA and its single, "I Write Sins Not Tragedies", reached number seven on the Billboard Hot 100. Panic! at the Disco are known for combining emo with electronics and their album A Fever You Can't Sweat Out is an emo album with elements of dance-punk and baroque pop. The Red Jumpsuit Apparatus' "Face Down" peaked at number 24 on the Billboard Hot 100 and its album, Don't You Fake It, sold 852,000 copies in the United States. AFI's albums Sing the Sorrow and Decemberunderground both were certified platinum by the RIAA, with Decemberunderground peaking at number 1 on the Billboard 200. Paramore's 2007 album Riot! was certified triple platinum by the RIAA and several Paramore songs appeared on the Billboard Hot 100 in the late 2000s, including "Misery Business", "Decode", "Crushcrushcrush", "That's What You Get", and "Ignorance".

=== 2010–present: Mainstream decline, underground revivals ===
By 2010, emo's popularity began to decline. Many emo bands lost popularity or had changed genres; My Chemical Romance's album, Danger Days: The True Lives of the Fabulous Killjoys, featured a traditional pop-punk style. Paramore and Fall Out Boy both abandoned the emo genre with their 2013 albums, Paramore and Save Rock and Roll, respectively. Paramore moved to a new wave-influenced style. Panic! at the Disco also abandoned the emo pop genre to a synth-pop style on Too Weird to Live, Too Rare to Die!. Many emo bands, including My Chemical Romance, Alexisonfire, and Thursday, disbanded, raising concerns about the genre's viability. Andrew Sacher of Brooklyn Vegan explains, "The popularity led to backlash, and a rapidly-changing music industry eventually turned its attention away from punk-adjacent bands in the mainstream, leaving the genre stigmatized by the end of the 2000s, and eventually — as far as the mainstream was concerned — dead."

==== Late 2000s–late 2010s: fourth-wave emo ====
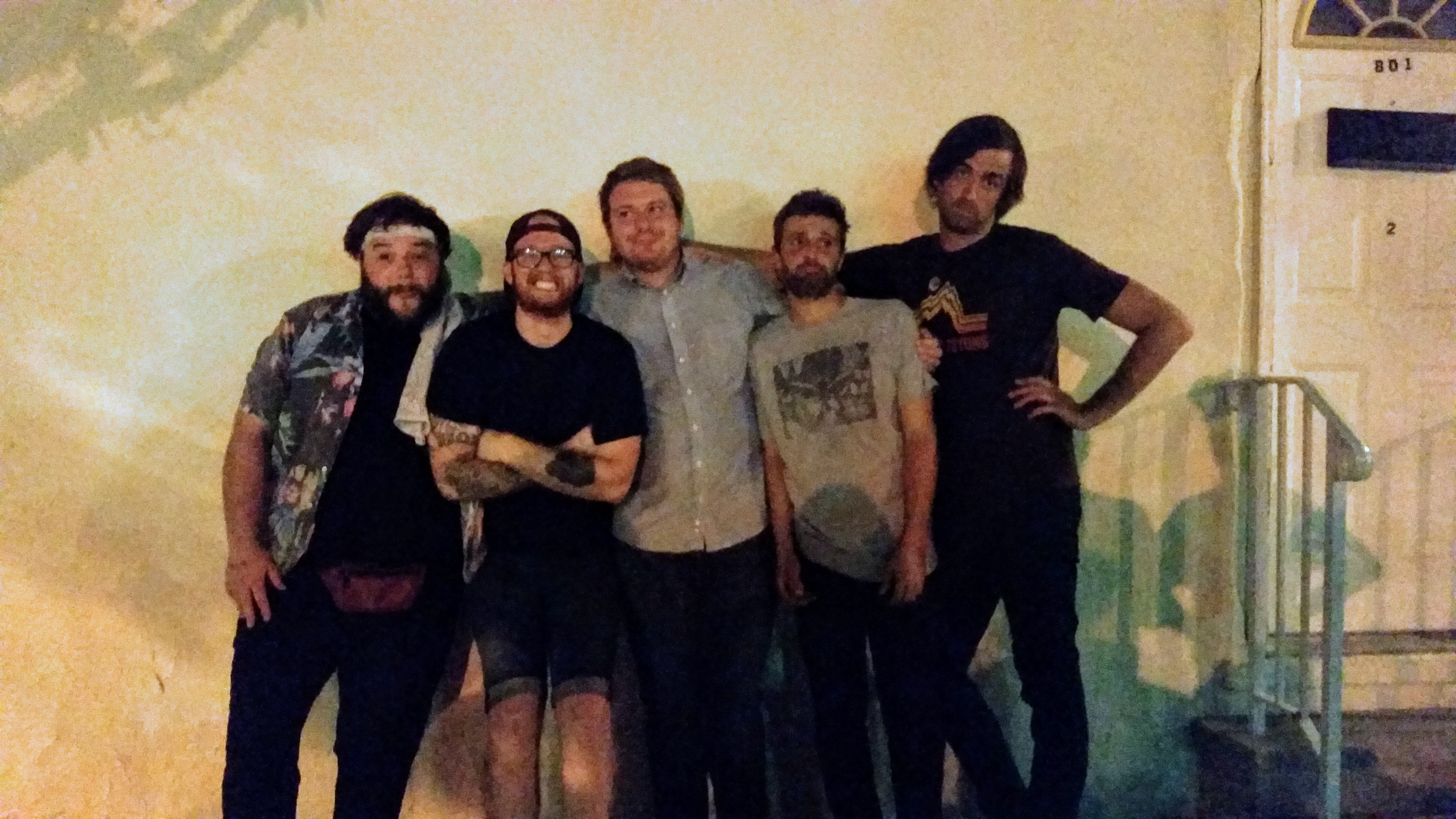
Stereogum cited Algernon Cadwallader's album Some Kind Of Cadwallader (2008) as the emo revival's watershed release

The emo revival or fourth-wave emo began in the late 2000s, taking influence from the sound of second wave Midwest emo, as a reaction against the perceived commerciality of the third-wave emo sound. The movement began with Pennsylvania-based groups Tigers Jaw, Glocca Morra, Snowing and Algernon Cadwallader and the English band TTNG. A 2018 Stereogum article cited Algernon Cadwallader's 2008 LP Some Kind Of Cadwallader as the emo revival's watershed release, while a 2020 article by Junkee called Tigers Jaw's 2008 self-titled second album "a true landmark release for the era". Philadelphia's scene remained prominent throughout the wave, contributing bands such as Everyone Everywhere, Modern Baseball, Hop Along, Jank, Balance and Composure, and mewithoutYou. These bands embraced a DIY ethos and reintroduced basement shows to the emo scene. Under their influence, underground emo scenes formed across the United States in such localities as West Virginia, Willimantic, Connecticut, and Chicago.

One prominent element of the emo scene at the time was a movement called "the wave", made up of bands reviving 1990s emo, screamo and post-hardcore sounds. The name was originally coined to refer to only Touché Amoré, La Dispute, Defeater, Pianos Become the Teeth and Make Do and Mend, however by 2014 had expanded to also include groups Balance and Composure, Into It. Over It. and Title Fight. The Wave style was influential upon many groups in Australia and the United Kingdom, especially Wales. At this time, the YouTube channel Dreambound was one of the most prominent sources for finding bands, uploading music videos for many prominent bands. The most prominent act in this scene was Casey from South Wales, with Australian bands Vacant Home and Ambleside too gaining international success. In the later years of this scene, bands began decreasing the influence they took from hardcore, when Crooks, Holding Absence and Endless Heights were instead leaning further into post-rock and shoegaze.

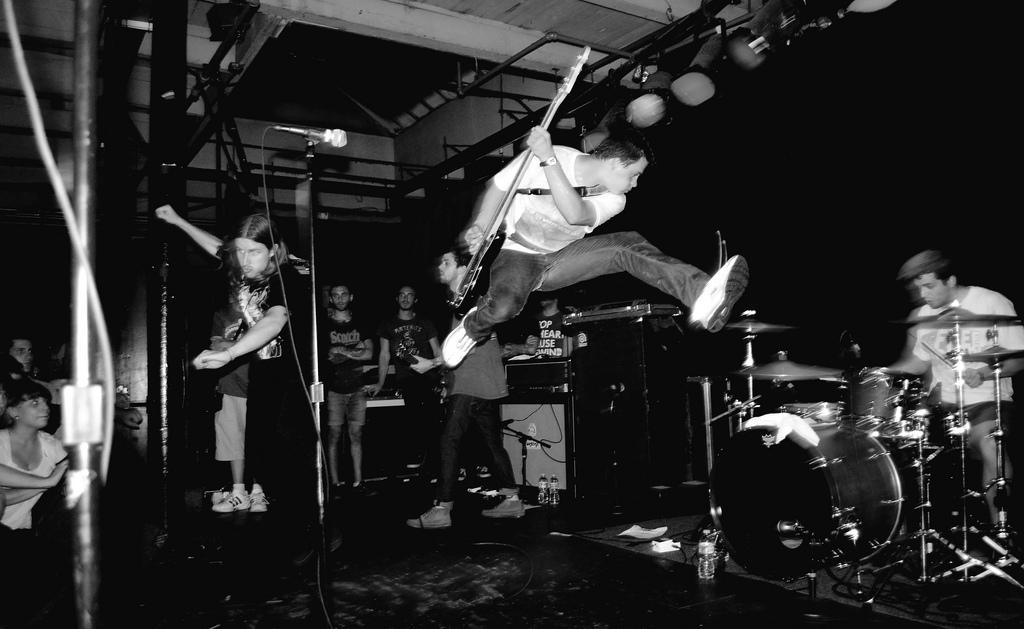
Title Fight, a forefront act in fourth-wave emo

Another notable segment within this wave of emo was the sound of soft grunge. Merging elements of emo, pop-punk and alternative rock the genre originated with bands from the hardcore punk scene who began making music inspired by 1990s emo and post-hardcore as well as early 1990s alternative rock groups like the Smashing Pumpkins, Soundgarden and Alice in Chains. The first wave of bands emerged in the early 2010s, including Adventures, Balance and Composure, Basement, Citizen, Pity Sex, Superheaven and Turnover. The majority of these bands were signed to Run for Cover Records, made use of fuzz pedals and filmed their music videos using 8 mm film. Title Fight stood at the forefront of the genre with the success of their 2012 album Floral Green.

By the end of the 2010s, many of the most influential bands in fourth wave emo had disbanded: Modern Baseball in 2017, Title Fight in 2018 and Balance and Composure in 2019. Meanwhile, other bands who had previously been prolific, such as Defeater and La Dispute, entered periods of inactivity.

In the 2020s, emo's impact on mainstream music of the 2010s, as well as a revival of the genre itself, was noted in media outlets. The BBC observed in 2018 "beyond guitar-based bands, the influence of emo can be seen in much of modern music, both in style and lyrical content" and "addressing mental health issues has become increasingly more common in pop".

==== Late 2010s–present: fifth-wave emo ====
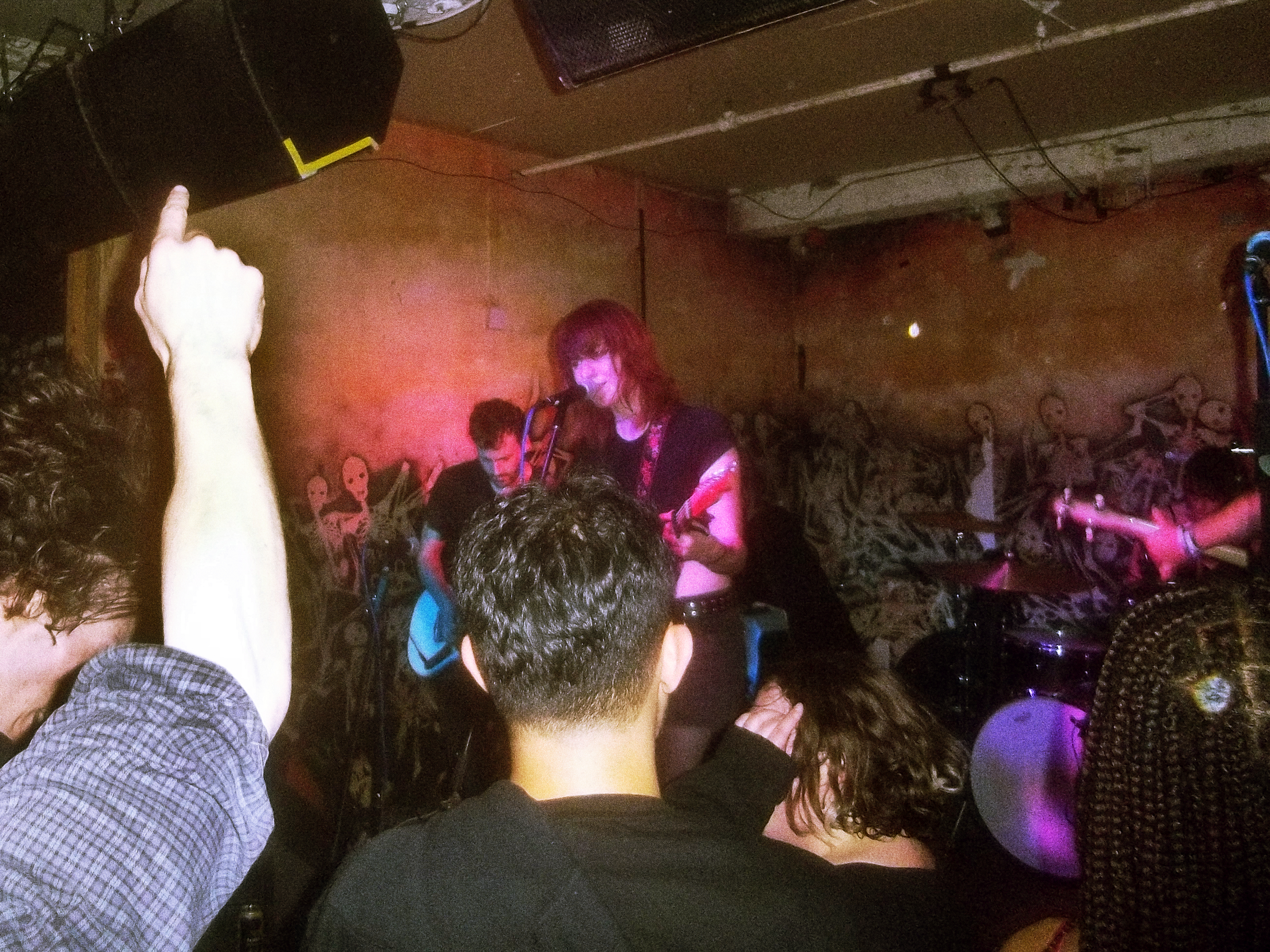
Awakebutstillinbed were a forefront band in early fifth-wave emo

Following the revival era in the early 2010s, a number of new bands emerged in the emo genre, grouped into a distinct fifth-wave wave starting from the late 2010s to the early 2020s. The Ringer writer Ian Cohen states fifth-wave emo began as early as 2017. That year, Spin discussed a wave of "newer darlings" who were reviving the emo revival sound, calling this the "emo revival revival". Notable early fifth-wave artists included Dogleg, Glass Beach, Origami Angel, Pool Kids and Awakebutstillinbed. Around 2019, an international, online wave of musical artists merging emo and shoegaze began, particularly under the influence of Ovlov and Pity Sex. This wave included Weatherday, Asian Glow, Computerwife and Hotline TNT, many of whom were solo artists.

During the late 2010s, much of the fifth-wave of emo was in disparate, disconnected scenes. However, amidst the COVID-19 lockdowns, these scenes began to converge online, coalescing into a unified fifth-wave of emo by 2021. A major part of this converge was Home Is Where's heavy use of the term on social media, and the popularity of their EP I Became Birds (2021). The fifth-wave of emo was also noted by Buzzfeed writer Pauline Woodley as having a focus on inclusivity of bands with transgender, queer, female and black artists as well as other artists of color.

During the later years of the fourth-wave, bands such as Crying and the Brave Little Abacus experimented with emo, developing the "post-emo" genre. Post-emo was the forefront style of the fifth-wave of emo, pushing the genre even more experimental, and often using elements of styles outside the boarders of rock. In particular, many acts in the wave embraced elements of electronic music. At this time, Origami Angel incorporating elements of nu metal, trap music and bosa nova, Parannoul with digicore and shoegaze, Really From with jazz, Hey ILY! with chiptune and Foxtails with art rock while also making use of violins. Cohen also noted the Spirit of the Beehive and Snowing as "a blueprint" for much of the wave.

The sound of the fifth-wave was a reaction against the progressive music elements that entered the later years of the fourth-wave. Its online prominence led to a rise in bands whose membership was international, such as Gingerbee, and incorporated a chronically online mentality into the music, particularly through unorthodox arrangements and genre fusions. Some groups imbued their music with a layer of irony which Cohen compared to shitposting. He particularly cited Captain Jazz (whose name is a play on Cap'n Jazz) and their maximalist Garry's Mod aesthetic, amongst a fusion of twinkle emo, screamo, electronic music and post-rock. Cohen noted the online emo community as mostly based around the websites Album of the Year and Rate Your Music, and particularly focusing on the projects Weatherday, Parannoul and What is Your Name?

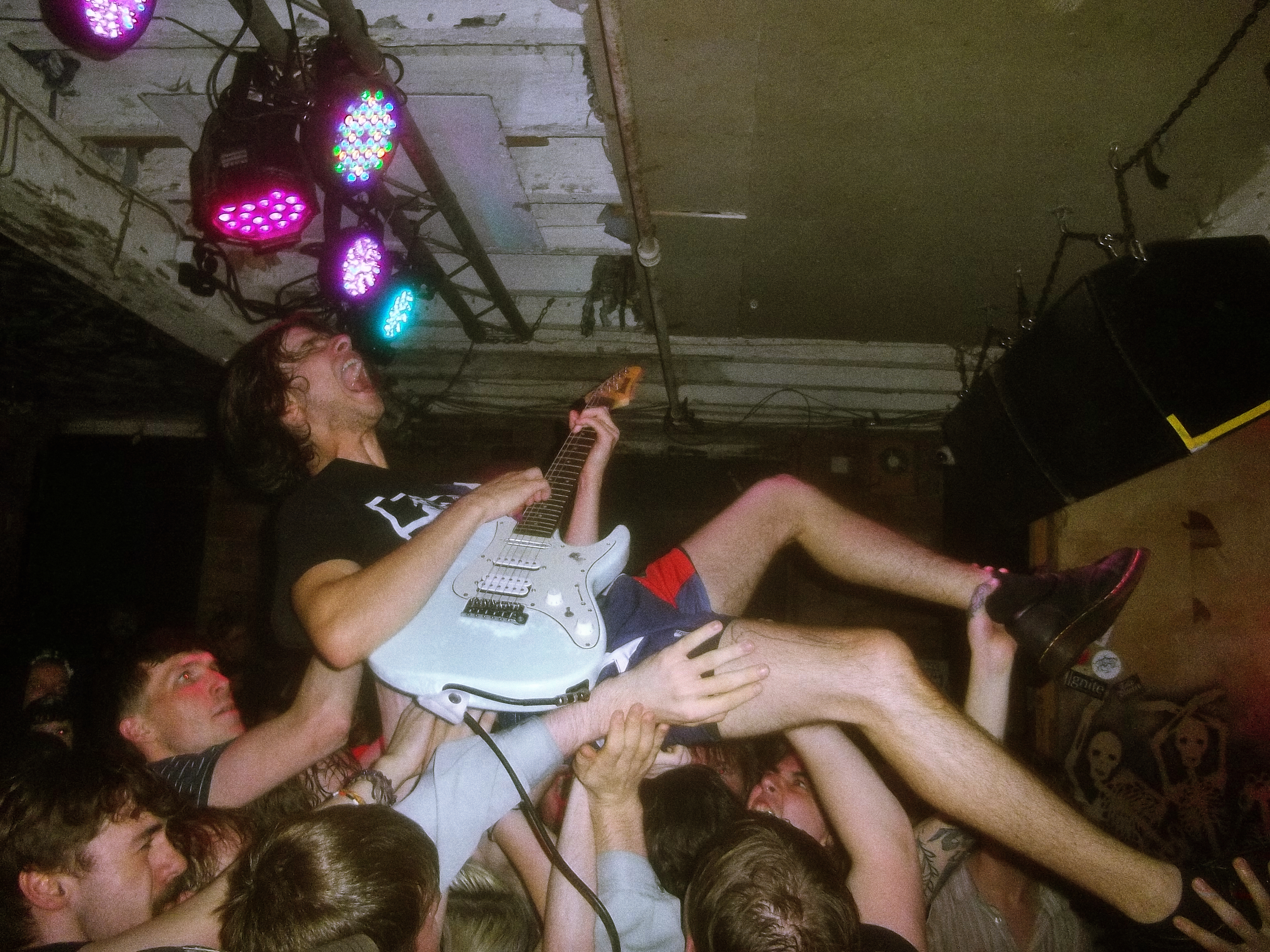
In the 2020s, Your Arms Are My Cocoon pioneered bedroom skramz, a fusion of screamo, Midwest emo and bedroom pop

Your Arms Are My Cocoon's 2020 self-titled debut EP pioneered a style that merged screamo and bedroom pop called bedroom skramz, which was widely influential, particularly amongst uploads by artists on Bandcamp. Boolin Tunes called Your Arms Are My Cocoon "a cornerstone of [emo's] fifth wave". The project also incorporated elements of chiptune. Oftentimes, subsequent bedroom skramz projects incorporated Midwest emo's riffing style and screamed vocals with major key synthesiser melodies and calm drum samples. By February 2022, the style had been adopted by Rookie Card, That Same Street, the Civil War in France, Calendar Year and Garden Angel. Amongst these articles, experimentation with other genres continued, with Garden Angel taking from Nintendocore, house music and country music and That Same Street making use of vocaloid vocals. On their 2025 album Apiary, Gingerbee took bedroom skramz in a more progressive direction.

Cohen credited Home is Where, Your Arms Are My Cocoon, Hey, Ily!, Lobster Fight, Rookie Card and Summer 2000 as "rerout[ing]" the fifth-wave away from the emo revival and the sound of Midwest emo. Around this time, many artists outside of emo incorporated elements of Midwest emo into their style, including Jim Legxacy and Jamila Woods. Hyperpop artists Jane Remover and Brakence incorporated elements of Midwest emo. Sources including Cohen cited Brakence's second album Hypochondriac (2022) as the "most important emo album since [the World is a Beautiful Place's] Harmlessness". Revolver editor Eli Enis said Jane Remover "mastered fifth-wave emo in one shot". Meanwhile, a separate group of bands defined another path for the genre that was still based in the hardcore scene and lacked the mainline fifth-wave scene's internet-centricity, including One Step Closer, Koyo and Anxious. Cohen hailed Anxious' song "In April" as "The Most Important Emo Song" of 2022.

In January 2025, Cohen observed that the fifth-wave of emo was declining and a sixth-wave was beginning. His conclusion was based on an increased number of bands distancing themselves from the fifth-wave's experimentation, instead reviving the sounds of the fourth-wave, citing the increased success of late 2010s bands Ogbert the Nerd and Oolong, as well as new bands such as Pomfret. That year, many prominent fifth-wave emo bands disbanded or pivoted their styles away from emo. BrooklynVegan editor Andrew Sacher credited the "emo revival revival" tag to See Through Person and Ben Quad on their album I'm Scared That's All There Is (2022). The term was also used as a self-identifier by Kerosene Heights, to reference their embrace of the early emo revival sound of Algernon Cadwallader and Glocca Morra.

At the same time, some established fifth-wave emo bands shifted their sound towards pop screamo, this included Ben Quad on Ephemera (2024) and Asian Glow on IIIVIII (2026). This coincided with a new wave of bands practicing the style including I Promised the World and Car Underwater.

== Subgenres and fusion genres ==
=== Subgenres ===
==== Screamo ====
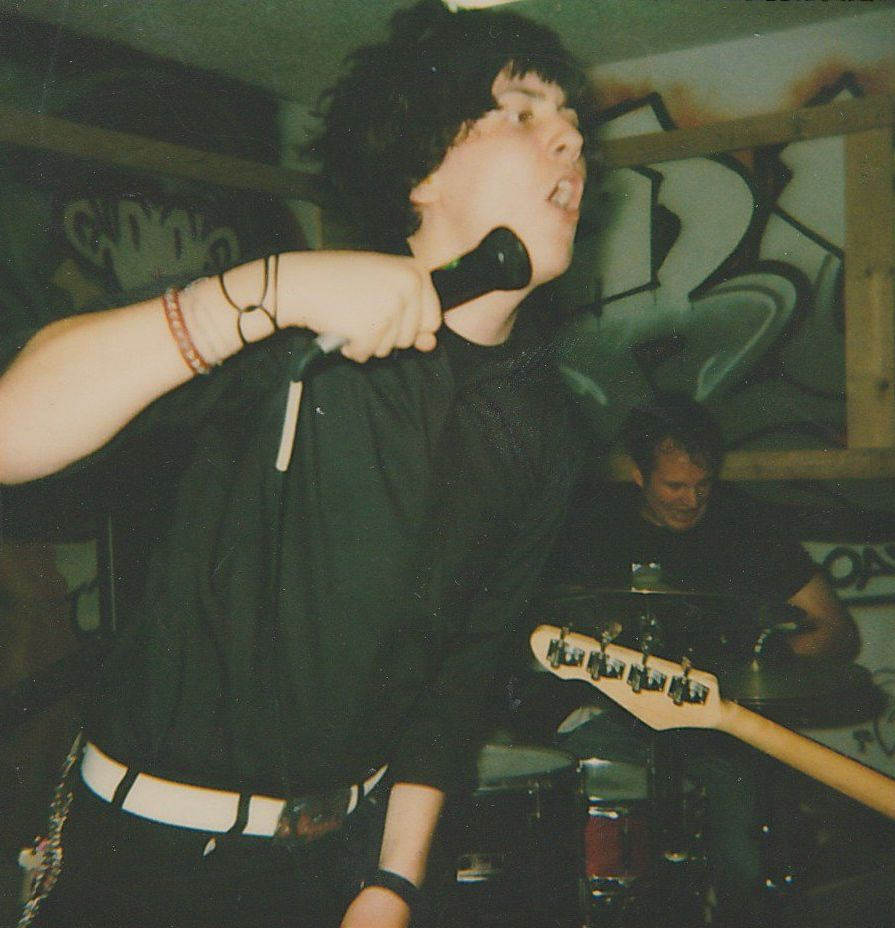
Screamo band Orchid performing in Bloomington, Indiana in 2000

The term "screamo" was initially applied to an aggressive offshoot of emo which developed in San Diego in 1991 and used short songs grafting "spastic intensity to willfully experimental dissonance and dynamics". Screamo is a dissonant form of emo influenced by hardcore punk, with typical rock instrumentation and noted for short songs, chaotic execution and screaming vocals.

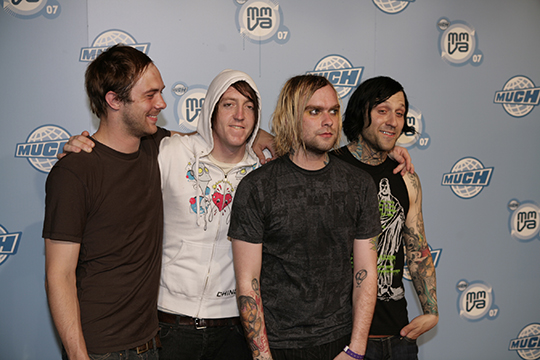
The Used's self-titled album was called "one of the masterworks of the screamo movement" by The Kansas City Star.

The genre is "generally based in the aggressive side of the overarching punk-revival scene". It began at the Ché Café with groups such as Heroin, Antioch Arrow, Angel Hair, Mohinder, Swing Kids, and Portraits of Past. They were influenced by Washington, D.C. post-hardcore (particularly Fugazi and Nation of Ulysses), straight edge, the Chicago group Articles of Faith, the hardcore-punk band Die Kreuzen and the post-punk and gothic rock bands like Bauhaus. I Hate Myself is a band described as "a cornerstone of the 'screamo' genre" by author Matt Walker: "Musically, I Hate Myself relied on being very slow and deliberate, with sharp contrasts between quiet, almost meditative segments that rip into loud and heavy portions driven by Jim Marburger's tidal wave scream." Other early screamo bands include Pg. 99, Saetia, and Orchid.

The Used, Thursday, Thrice and Hawthorne Heights, who all formed in the United States during the late 1990s and early 2000s and remained active throughout the 2000s, helped popularize screamo-influenced music as a part of the pop screamo style. Post-hardcore bands such as Refused and At the Drive-In paved the way for these bands. Pop screamo bands from the Canadian emo scene such as Silverstein and Alexisonfire also emerged at this time.

By the mid-2000s, the saturation of the screamo scene caused many bands to expand beyond the genre and incorporate more-experimental elements. Non-screamo bands used the genre's characteristic guttural vocal style. Some screamo bands during this time period were inspired by genres like pop-punk and heavy metal.

Jeff Mitchell of the Iowa State Daily wrote, "There is no set definition of what screamo sounds like but screaming over once deafeningly loud rocking noise and suddenly quiet, melodic guitar lines is a theme commonly affiliated with the genre."

===== Sass =====
Sass (also known as sassy screamo, sasscore, white belt hardcore, white belt, sassgrind or dancey screamo) is a style that emerged from the late-1990s and early-2000s screamo scene. The genre incorporates elements of post-punk, new wave, disco, electronic, dance-punk, grindcore, noise rock, metalcore, and mathcore. The genre is characterized by often incorporating overtly flamboyant mannerisms, erotic lyrical content, synthesizers, dance beats and a lisping vocal style. Sass bands include the Blood Brothers, An Albatross, The Number Twelve Looks Like You, the Plot to Blow Up the Eiffel Tower, Daughters's early music, Orchid's later music and SeeYouSpaceCowboy.

=== Fusion genres ===
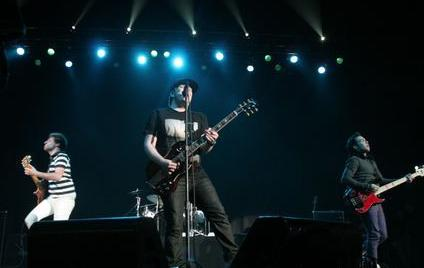
Fall Out Boy performing in 2006

==== Emo pop ====
Emo pop (or emo pop punk) is a subgenre of emo known for its pop music influences, more concise songs and hook-filled choruses. AllMusic describes emo pop as blending "youthful angst" with "slick production" and mainstream appeal, using "high-pitched melodies, rhythmic guitars, and lyrics concerning adolescence, relationships, and heartbreak". The Guardian described emo pop as a cross between "saccharine boy-band pop" and emo.

Emo pop developed during the 1990s. Bands like Jawbreaker and Samiam are known for formulating the emo pop punk style. According to Nicole Keiper of CMJ New Music Monthly, Sense Field's Building (1996) pushed the band "into the emo-pop camp with the likes of the Get Up Kids and Jejune". As emo became commercially successful in the early 2000s, emo pop became popular with Jimmy Eat World's 2001 album Bleed American and the success of its single "The Middle". Jimmy Eat World, the Get Up Kids and the Promise Ring also are early emo pop bands. The emo pop style of Jimmy Eat World's album, Clarity influenced later emo. The emo band Braid's 1998 album Frame & Canvas has been described as emo pop by Blake Butler of AllMusic, who gave the Braid album four out of five stars and wrote that Frame & Canvas "proves to be one of Braid's best efforts". Emo pop became successful during the late 1990s, with its popularity increasing in the early 2000s. The Get Up Kids sold over 15,000 copies of their debut album, Four Minute Mile (1997), before signing with Vagrant Records. The label promoted them, sending them on tours to open for Green Day and Weezer. Their 1999 album, Something to Write Home About, reached number 31 on Billboard's Top Heatseekers chart. As of May 2, 2002, Something to Write Home About sold 134,000 copies in the United States, according to Nielsen SoundScan.

As emo pop coalesced, the Fueled by Ramen label became a center of the movement and signed Fall Out Boy, Panic! at the Disco, and Paramore (all of whom had been successful). Two regional scenes developed. The Florida scene was created by Fueled by Ramen; midwest emo-pop was promoted by Pete Wentz, whose Fall Out Boy rose to the forefront of the style during the mid-2000s. Cash Cash released Take It to the Floor (2008); according to AllMusic, it could be "the definitive statement of airheaded, glittery, and content-free emo-pop ... the transformation of emo from the expression of intensely felt, ripped-from-the-throat feelings played by bands directly influenced by post-punk and hardcore to mall-friendly Day-Glo pop played by kids who look about as authentic as the "punks" on an old episode of Quincy did back in the '70s was made pretty much complete". You Me at Six released their 2008 debut album, Take Off Your Colours, described by AllMusic's Jon O'Brien as "follow[ing] the 'emo-pop for dummies' handbook word-for-word". The album was certified gold in the UK.

==== Emo rap ====
Emo rap, a genre that combines emo music with hip-hop, began in the mid–to late 2010s. Prominent artists of emo hip-hop include Lil Peep, XXXTentacion, and Nothing,Nowhere. In the mid-to late 2010s, emo rap broke into the mainstream. Deceased rapper XXXTentacion's song "Sad!" peaked at number 1 on the Billboard Hot 100 on June 30, 2018. Lil Uzi Vert's song "XO Tour Llif3" peaked at number 7 on the Billboard Hot 100 and the song was certified 14× platinum by the RIAA for sales of over 14 million copies.

== Subculture and stereotypes ==
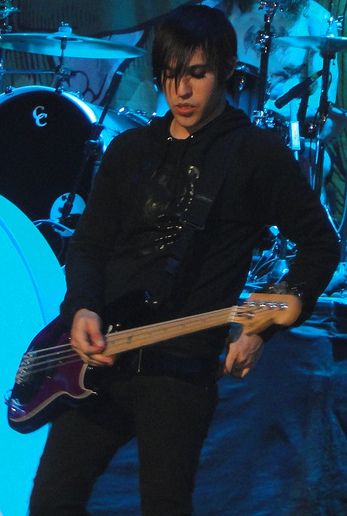
Pete Wentz of Fall Out Boy displaying features of emo fashion: skinny jeans, eye liner, and flat, straight, jet-black hair with long bangs covering the face

Emo emerged as a pervasive buzzword in the early 2000s as many of the groups associated with the style became among the decade's bestselling rock acts. As emo grew in notoriety, the popular press tended to reduce emo to stereotypes of weepy male vulnerability, and the label was often met with critical derision. At the same time female emo fans like the music writer Jessica Hopper lamented how the music's focus on subjective male suffering served to limit women's roles and reduce them to voiceless, unattainable objects. The majority of groups lumped together as part of the genre were well aware of emo's various negative connotations and unsurprisingly steadfastly refused any allegiance to an emo movement.

— Theo Cateforis of Grove Music Dictionary (July 25, 2013)

The beginning of emo as a subculture rather than just a style of music dates back to the mid-1990s San Diego screamo scene. The scene's bands, such as Heroin, Antioch Arrow and Swing Kids, and participants in this scene were often called "spock rock", in reference to their black-dyed hair with straight fringes. As the vocalist of Swing Kids, Justin Pearson had choppy spikes protruding from the back of his head alongside straight fringes, which was a prototype for the emo haircut. During this time, emo fashion was clean-cut and tended towards geek chic, with clothing items like thick-rimmed glasses resembling 1950s musician Buddy Holly, button-down shirts, t-shirts, sweater vests, tight jeans, converse shoes, and cardigans being common.

Emo fashion in the mid-to late 2000s included skinny jeans, tight T-shirts (usually short-sleeved, and often with the names of emo bands), studded belts, Converse sneakers, Vans and black wristbands. Thick, horn-rimmed glasses remained in style to an extent, and eye liner and black fingernails became common during the mid-2000s. The best-known facet of emo fashion is its hairstyle: flat, straight, usually jet-black hair with long bangs covering much of the face, which has been called a fad. As emo became a subculture, people who dressed in emo fashion and associated themselves with its music were known as "emo kids" or "emos".

Emo has occasionally been associated with the stereotypes of emotion, sensitivity, shyness, introversion or angst. More controversially, stereotypes surrounding the genre included depression, self-harm and suicide, in part stoked by depictions of emo fans as a "cult" by British tabloid Daily Mail. Emos and goths were often distinguished by the stereotype that "emos hate themselves, while goths hate everyone." In 2020, The Independent wrote on such stereotypes, that "emo was singled out for the destructive behaviour of teenagers who'd found a home in a subculture that offered them community and a vehicle for self-expression."

== Social impact ==
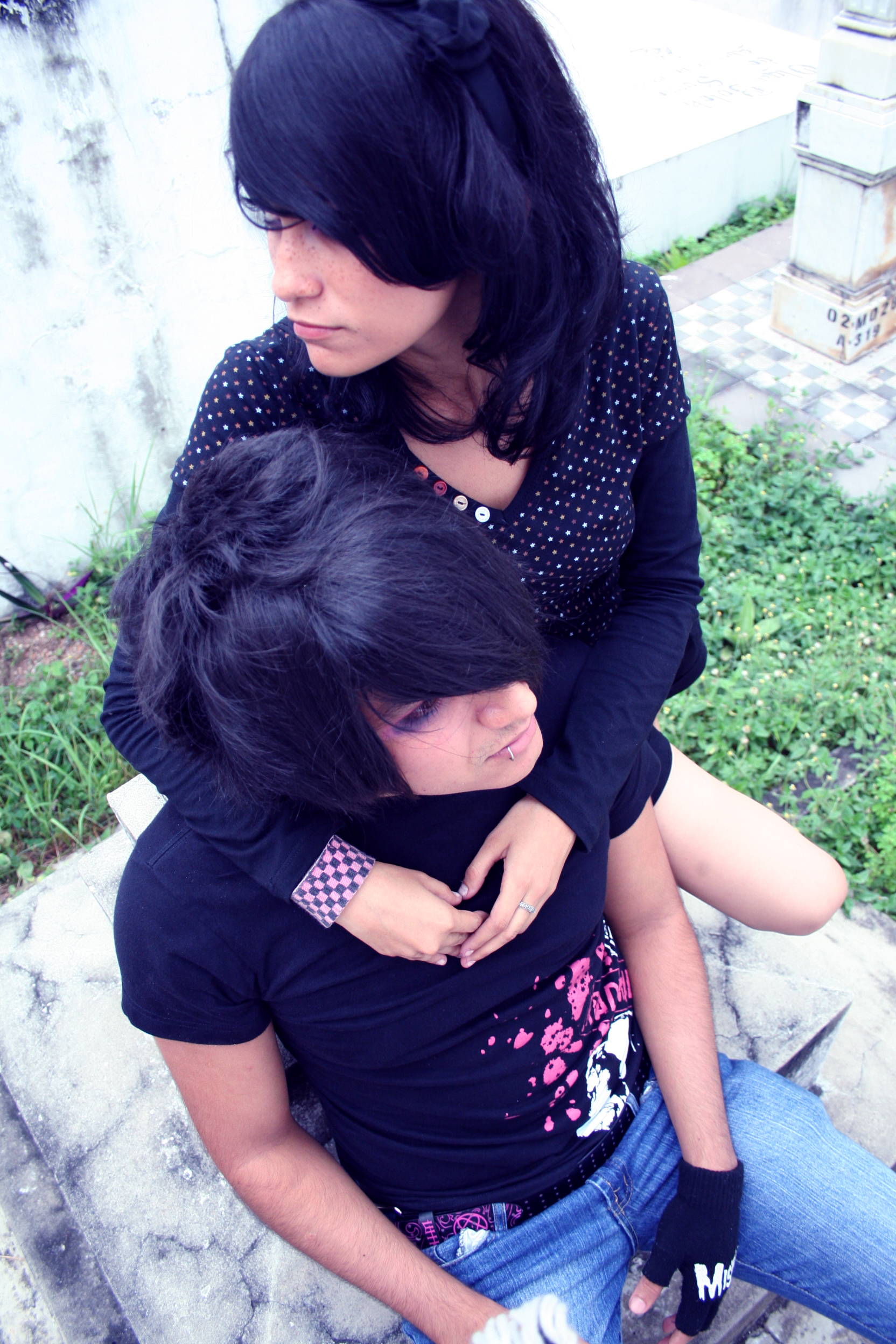
Two emo teens

=== Cultural reception and impact ===
This is such a funny time... I think just because so much of this language, it's like a youth code where heavy topics like suicide, depression, self-harm, things like that were like being grappled with in the music, but very rarely in a way that glorified it... Their music was a way out of it, or offering hope — a way that people could process these things and deal with it.

— Chris Payne, author of Where Are Your Boys Tonight?: The Oral History of Emo's Mainstream Explosion, as quoted by Amelia Eqbal of CBC (Jun 19, 2023).

In 2008, emo music was blamed for the suicide by hanging of British teenager Hannah Bond by the coroner at her inquest and her mother, Heather Bond, who suggested that the music and fandom glamorized suicide. They suggested Hannah's apparent obsession with My Chemical Romance was linked to her death. It was said at the inquest that she was part of an Internet "emo cult", and an image of an emo girl with bloody wrists was on her Bebo page. Hannah reportedly told her parents that her self-harm was an "emo initiation ceremony". Heather Bond criticised emo culture: "There are 'emo' websites that show pink teddies hanging themselves." The coroner's statements were featured in a series of articles in the Daily Mail, one of which featured the headline, "Why no child is safe from the sinister cult of emo." After they were reported in NME, fans of emo music contacted the magazine to deny that it promoted self-harm and suicide. Hundreds of teenagers protested and marched to the offices of Daily Mail to voice their opposition. "The kids stood up to it. The kids won," My Chemical Romance reacted online: "We have recently learned of the suicide and tragic loss of Hannah Bond. We'd like to send our condolences to her family during this time of mourning. Our hearts and thoughts are with them". The band also posted that they "are and always have been vocally anti-violence and anti-suicide".

The Guardian later described the purported link and subsequent backlash against emo in the 2000s as a "moral panic", while Kerrang! compared it to historic controversies involving Judas Priest and Ozzy Osbourne, unduly demonizing the subculture, and poorly examining mental health issues of young people.

Feminist rock journalist and former riot grrrl Jessica Hopper criticized emo for its valorization of male suffering and inclusion of women only as distant and silent objects. "Records by a legion of done-wrong boys lined the record store shelves. Every record was a concept album about a breakup, damning the girl on the other side. Emo's contentious monologue — it's balled fist Peter Pan mash-note dilemmas — it's album length letters from pussy-jail — it's cathedral building in ode to man-pain and Robert-Bly-isms — it's woman-induced misery has gone from being descriptive to being prescriptive. Emo was just another forum where women were locked in a stasis of outside observation, observing ourselves through the eyes of others."

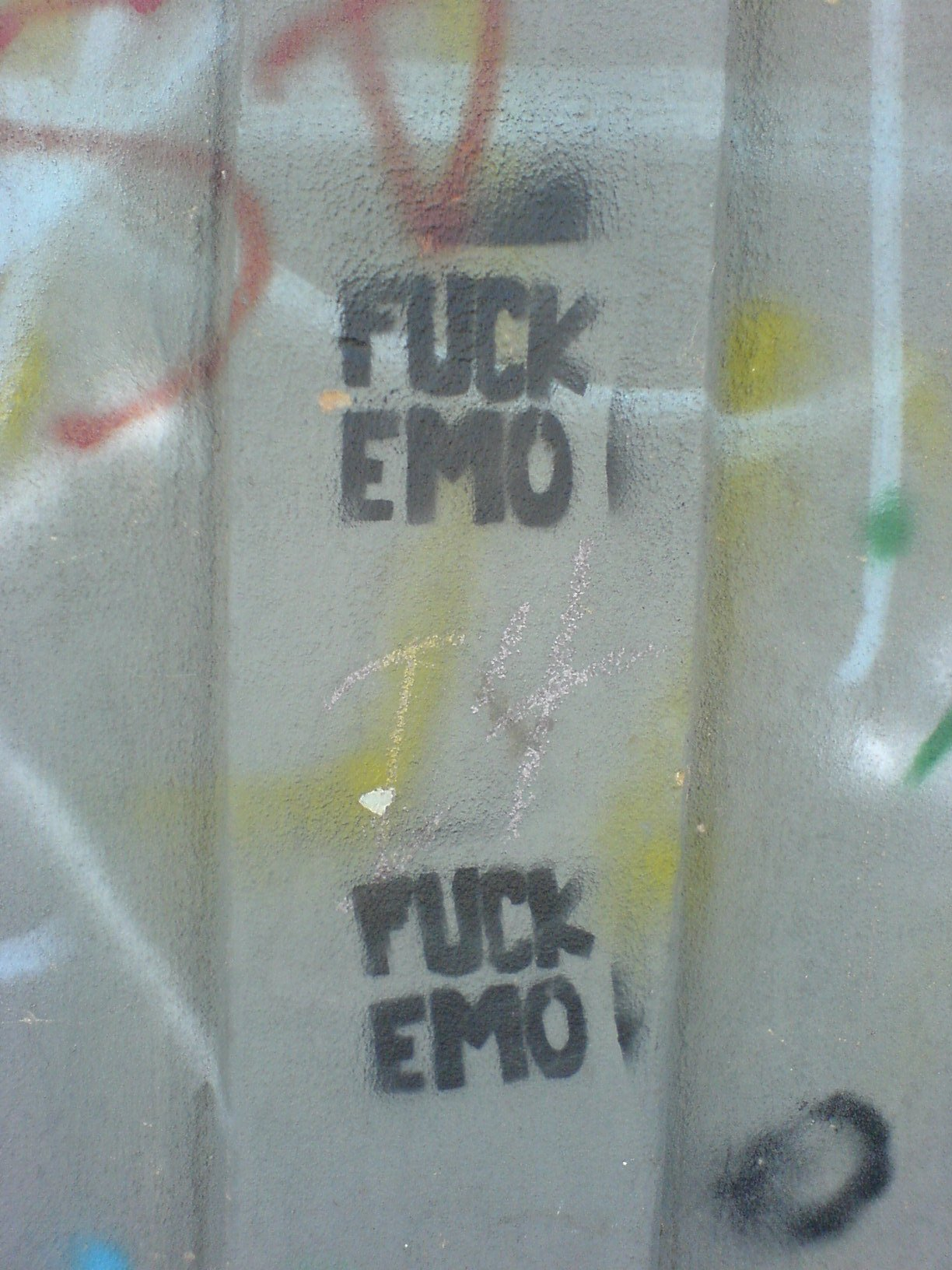
"Fuck emo" graffiti in Mexico

Warped Tour founder Kevin Lyman said that there was a "real backlash" by bands on the tour against emo groups, but he dismissed the hostility as "juvenile". The backlash intensified, with anti-emo groups attacking teenagers in Mexico City, Querétaro, and Tijuana in 2008. Legislation was proposed in Russia's Duma regulating emo websites and banning emo attire in schools and government buildings, with the subculture perceived as a "dangerous teen trend" promoting anti-social behaviour, depression, social withdrawal and suicide. The BBC reported that in March 2012, Shia militias in Iraq shot or beat to death as many as 58 young Iraqi emos. Some metalheads and punks often were known for disliking emos and criticizing the emo subculture.

In 2025, a mollusk fossil was named after the genre as Emo vorticaudum. The name was chosen to reflect the distinct characteristics of the mollusk. According to Sanjana Gajbhiye of Earth.com, "[Emo] was named for its elongated, folded posture, which suggested unusual and unconventional ways of moving. Its name reflects individuality and adaptability, much like the cultural association with the emo style."

=== Musicology ===
Emo studies or emo musicology is a developing area of study, with a growing body of academic content being written about the emo genre. The first official emo studies conference entitled "A Conference…, but it's Midwest Emo", shortened to "EmoCon", was hosted in April 2026 at Washington University's School of Music. The conference was opened with a talk by Steve Lamos, scholar and drummer of the band American Football, with the keynote address given by American music writer Dan Ozzi.

== See also ==
- List of emo artists
- Scene (subculture)
