= Emo revival =

2010s underground emo movement

- Branch: Emo
- Years active: Late 2000s–mid-2010s
- Location: United States (Philadelphia, Chicago), United Kingdom
- Major figures: Tigers Jaw; Algernon Cadwallader; Modern Baseball; the Hotelier; Joyce Manor; Basement; Citizen; Title Fight
- Influences: Midwest emo; screamo; indie rock; math rock; post-hardcore; pop punk
- Influenced: Emo rap; soft grunge; defend pop punk era; fifth-wave emo

The emo revival, or fourth wave emo, was an underground emo movement which began in the late 2000s and flourished until the mid-2010s. The movement began towards the end of the 2000s third-wave emo, with Pennsylvania-based groups such as Tigers Jaw, Algernon Cadwallader and Snowing eschewing that era's mainstream sensibilities in favor of influence from 1990s Midwest emo (i.e., second wave emo).

The movement had become prominent in underground music by the mid-2010s, with influential releases from era-defining groups like Modern Baseball, the Hotelier and Joyce Manor. It also expanded in scope and sonic diversity during this period. Soft grunge was pioneered by such groups as Title Fight, Basement, Citizen and Turnover. Fourth-wave emo entered a decline toward the decade's end, as influential bands disbanded or entered periods of hiatus. A fifth-wave of bands began pushing the genre into more experimental territory, often embracing post-rock; examples include Pool Kids, Glass Beach and Awakebutstillinbed.

== Characteristics ==
Bands of the emo revival are predominately influenced by acts from the Midwest emo scene of the 1990s and early 2000s; according to Ultimate Guitar staff writer Maria Pro, the terms second-wave emo and Midwest emo are used interchangeably to describe that time period's scene. Revival bands often display a "DIY sound" and lyrical themes ranging from nostalgia to adulthood. Pro, however, further writes that the revival only borrowed from the second wave in terms of aesthetics; sonically, it featured a distinct fusion of math rock, post-hardcore and pop punk.

The emo revival ran parallel to the wave, and as, around 2013, the definition of "emo revival" expanded, some of the major groups in the wave began to also be considered a part of the emo revival.

== History ==
=== Midwest emo revival ===
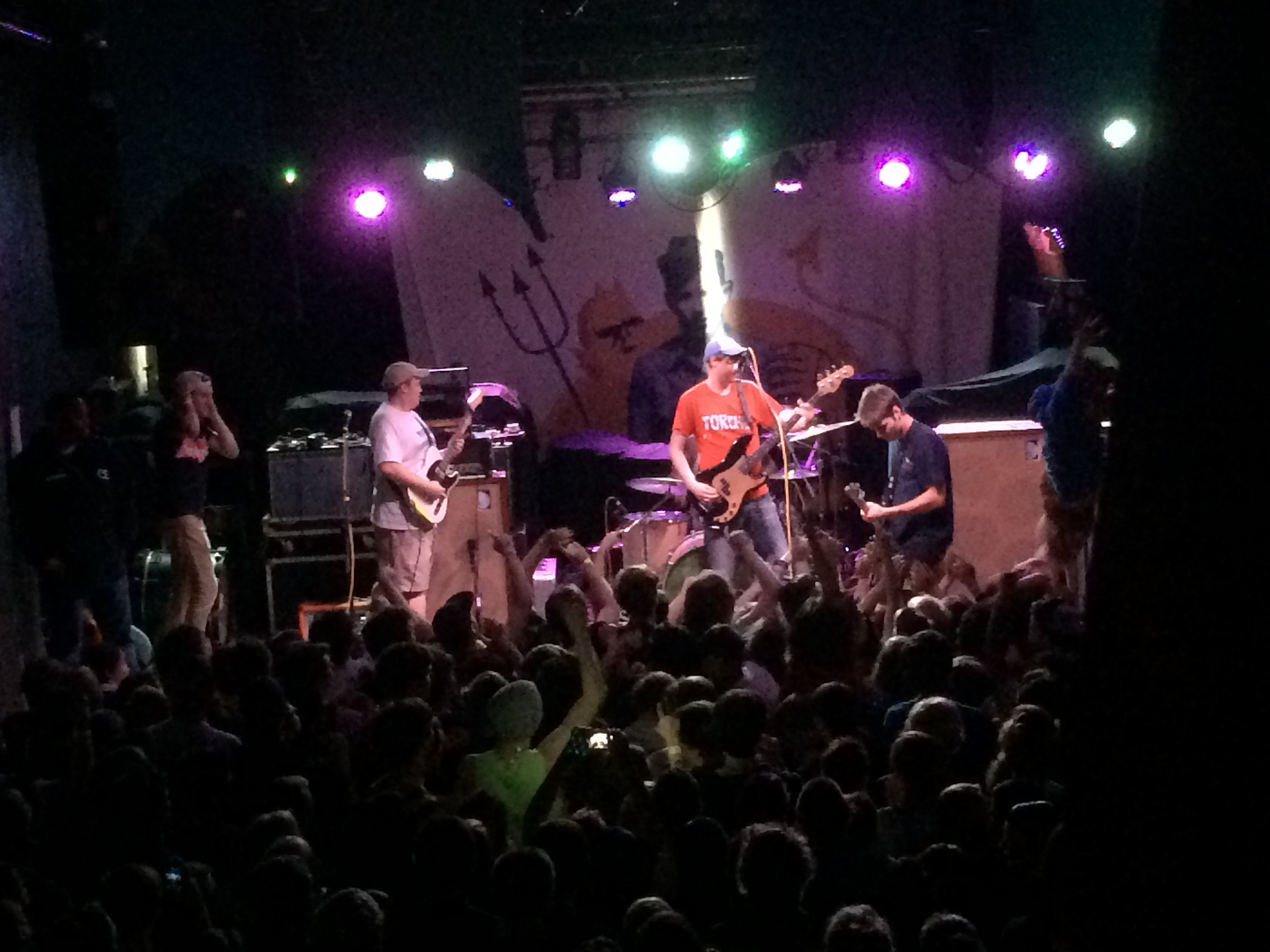
Philadelphia's Modern Baseball were one of the bigger players in the emo revival.

While third-wave emo was reaching its commercial peak in the mid-to late 2000s by embracing the sounds of mainstream radio music, fourth-wave emo's forerunners began taking influence from the second-wave Midwest emo scene. The fourth wave was spearheaded by the Pennsylvania-based groups Tigers Jaw, Glocca Morra, Snowing and Algernon Cadwallader and the English band TTNG. A 2018 Stereogum article cited Algernon Cadwallader's 2008 LP Some Kind Of Cadwallader as the emo revival's watershed release, while a 2020 article by Junkee called Tigers Jaw's 2008 self-titled second album "a true landmark release for the era". These bands embraced a DIY ethos and reintroduced basement shows to the emo scene. Under their influence, underground emo scenes formed across the United States in such localities as West Virginia, Willimantic, Connecticut, and Chicago. Notable fourth-wave acts from the Chicago scene included Into It. Over It., CSTVT, Pet Symmetry, Joie de Vivre, Their / They're / There, Lifted Bells, and Dowsing. Fourth-wave emo had become a fully-realised movement by 2011. Philadelphia's scene remained prominent throughout the wave, contributing bands such as Everyone Everywhere, Modern Baseball, Hop Along, Jank, Balance and Composure, and mewithoutYou.

By 2013, the emo revival had become a dominant force in underground music. The year saw high-profile by Balance and Composure, Empire! Empire! (I Was A Lonely Estate), Brave Bird, Crash of Rhinos, Foxing, the Front Bottoms, Little Big League and the World Is a Beautiful Place & I Am No Longer Afraid to Die. The same year, Huntsville-based Camping in Alaska released their debut album, please be nice, which became a cult classic with the success of "c u in da ballpit" online. Spin named the Hotelier's second album Home, Like Noplace Is There (2014) as the best album of fourth wave emo, opining that it "made it undeniably clear that the most thoughtful, the most progressive and the most exciting thing in indie right now was happening right here".

During the movement, various emo bands from the 1990s and early 2000s have reunited for reunion tours or permanent reunions American Football and the Get-Up Kids. Furthermore, through this era, contemporary emo bands maintained a close associated with the hardcore scene and pop punk's ongoing Defend Pop Punk Era, which bore the influence of both hardcore and Midwest emo. In particular, the Wonder Years, Jeff Rosenstock, Charly Bliss and PUP were prominent acts during emo's fourth wave, who sonically were closer to pop punk.

=== Soft grunge ===
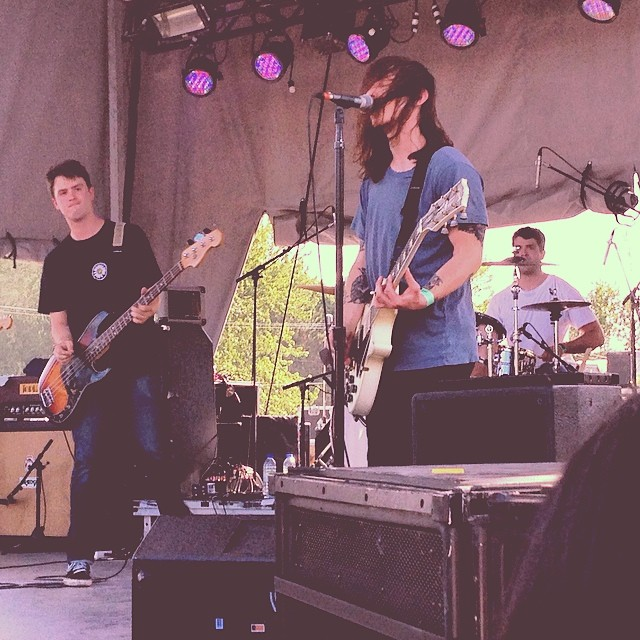
Title Fight were one of the forefront acts in soft grunge.

One notable segment within fourth wave emo was the sound of soft grunge. Originally coined as the "grunge revival", soft grunge merges elements of 1990s-style emo and grunge. Acts in the genre often embrace elements from a diverse array of styles including pop punk, alternative rock, shoegaze, indie rock and post-hardcore. Lyrics in the genre are often emotional, accompanied by a "brooding" vocal style, often mixed quietly and using slow, "droning" melodies. Guitar tones are modified using effects units, such as the atmospheric effects reverb and delay, as well as the fuzz effect. Many bands filmed their music videos using 8 mm film. Uproxx writer Ian Cohen called the genre "the midpoint" between Stone Temple Pilots's song "Sex Type Thing" (1993) and Sunny Day Real Estate's song "In Circles" (1994).

Soft grunge began when bands from the late 2000s hardcore punk scene began making music inspired by 1990s emo and post-hardcore groups like Rival Schools and the Promise Ring as well as early 1990s alternative rock groups like the Smashing Pumpkins, Soundgarden and Alice in Chains. In the early 2010s, the first wave of bands in the genre emerged, largely based around Run for Cover Records, including Adventures, Balance and Composure, Basement, Citizen, Pity Sex, Superheaven and Turnover. Title Fight stood at the forefront of the genre with the success of their 2012 album Floral Green. The album was widely influential, inspiring many bands to pursue a similar sound and reshaping Run for Cover into a label renowned for its grunge influence. Often, albums were produced by Will Yip. Some groups in this early era of the genre were made up of former easycore musicians, who shifted their sound into soft grunge. This included Citizen, In This for Fun who became Basement and Bangerang who became Superheaven.

Turnover's second album Peripheral Vision merged the genre with elements of dream pop and shoegaze. The album was widely influential, Movements vocalist Patrick Miranda stated in a 2025 interview that "Every band wanted to sound like Title Fight Floral Green. Every local band... until Turnover put out Peripheral Vision and then it was like the whole scene flipped". That year, many North American Defend Pop Punk Era acts shifted their sound in favor of soft grunge, becoming one of the most prominent sounds in the pop punk scene during the mid-2010s. Stereogum writer Ian Cohen described "the sound of popular punk" in the mid-2010s as being a "Warped Tour traditionalism, soft-grunge, emo revival, and indie-leaning pop-punk", particularly citing pop-punk band the Wonder Years's tour in support of their album The Greatest Generation as being "a time capsule" of the time, due to its openers being the soft grunge band Citizen, emo revival band Modern Baseball and pop-punk band Real Friends. In 2016, some prominent pioneers of the genre began to shift their sound closer to pop rock, particularly Balance and Composure on Light We Made and Basement on Promise Everything, with Citizen also taking a more commercial sound on As You Please (2017). Other acts in the genre from this time included Major League, Movements and Teenage Wrist.

=== Decline ===
By the middle of the decade many bands had begun experimenting considerably with their sound, creating music less indebted to the 1990s emo bands that defined the fourth wave's early years and instead morphing the style towards what many critics began to call post-emo. As early as 2015, Vice writer Ian Cohen referenced the end of the emo revival and the beginning of the post-emo era with the release of the World Is a Beautiful Place & I Am No Longer Afraid to Die's second album Harmlessness, while BrooklynVegan writer Andrew Sacher recalled the same sentiment retrospectively in 2021 about Foxing's 2018 third album Nearer My God.

By the end of the decade many of the most influential bands in fourth wave emo had disbanded: Modern Baseball in 2017, Title Fight in 2018 and Balance and Composure in 2019. mewithoutYou originally announced their break in 2019, after a final 2020 tour, however this tour was postponed due to COVID-19 pandemic and the band eventually broke up in 2022.

== Influence ==
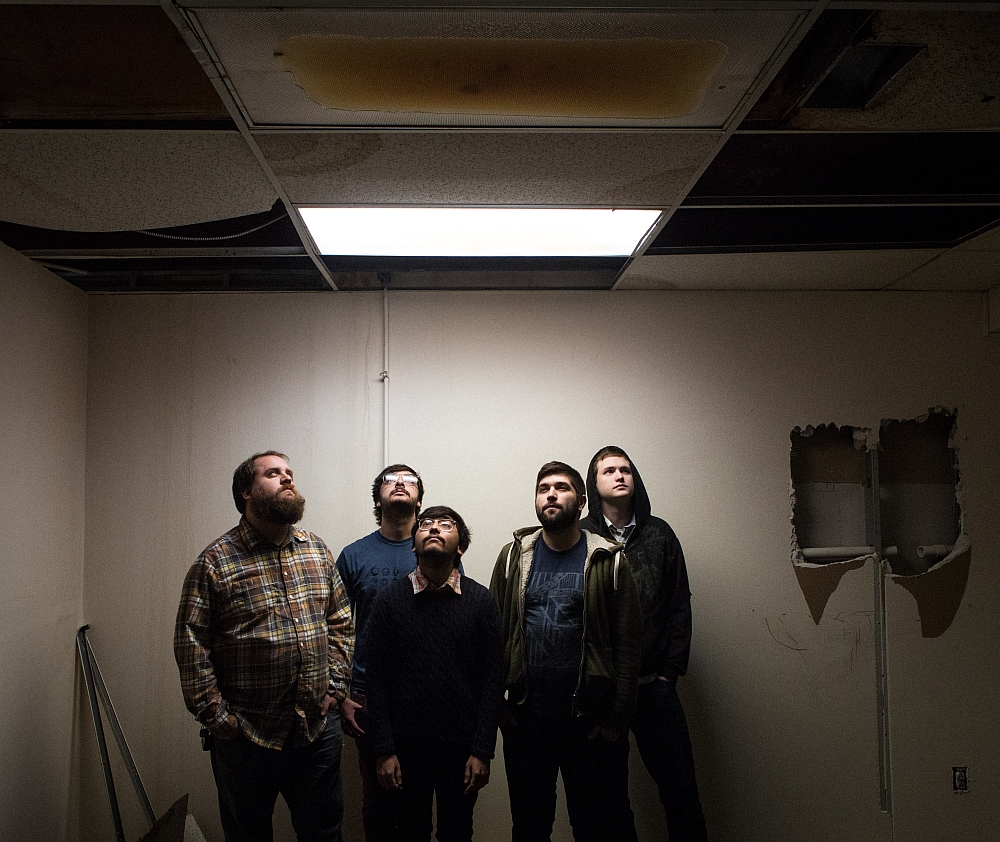
Fourth wave emo band Foxing's album Nearer My God (2018) helped pioneer the sound of fifth wave emo.

The underground success of fourth wave emo influenced the rise of the emo rap genre, which received significant mainstream success in the late 2010s with artists like Lil Peep, Lil Uzi Vert and Juice Wrld. One of the earliest pioneers of this sound was former Tigers Jaw guitarist and vocalist Adam McIlwee, who began the solo project Wicca Phase Springs Eternal and formed the influential emo rap collective GothBoiClique.

Following the revival era in the early 2010s, a number of new bands emerged in the emo genre which have often been grouped into a distinct wave starting from the late 2010s to the early 2020s. The Ringer writer Ian Cohen states fifth wave emo began as early as 2017 and that these emo groups were influenced by bands such as Crying and the Brave Little Abacus. This fifth wave of emo maintained many of the stylistic elements of the revival era, but also began to incorporate sounds from other genres such as jazz and electronic music. The fifth wave of emo has also been noted for its focus on inclusivity of bands with transgender, queer, female and black artists as well as other artists of color. Notable fifth-wave artists include Home Is Where, Dogleg, Glass Beach, Origami Angel, Pool Kids and Awakebutstillinbed.

In a 2017 article, Spin discussed a wave of "newer darlings" who were reviving the emo revival sound, calling this the "emo revival revival". By 2024, this title was being attributed to See Through Person and Ben Quad on their album I'm Scared That's All There Is (2022), and was being used as a self-identifier by Kerosene Heights, to reference their revival of the very early emo revival sound Algernon Cadwallader and Glocca Morra.

By 2023, remaining fourth-wave emo bands like Citizen, the Hotelier, Foxing and the Wonder Years began touring for the tenth anniversaries of their most influential records and receiving renewed critical acclaim.

During 2025, many bands who had been involved in the emo revival pushed their sound to be more aggressive and political. Algernon Cadwallader did so on their fourth album Trying Not to Have a Thought, which criticised anti-homeless architecture and the 1985 MOVE bombing; The World Is a Beautiful Place did so on Dreams of Being Dust, which discussed the Israeli–Palestinian conflict; and La Dispute did on No One Was Driving the Car which discussed the climate crisis.

== Criticism ==
The term "emo revival" has been the cause of controversy. Numerous artists and journalists have stated that it is not a revival at all and that, as a result of increasing usage of the Internet to discover music, people have stopped paying attention to locale-based underground emo. In 2013, Evan Weiss stated, "It's funny that people are only noticing it now because I feel like that revival has been happening for the last six years [...] It doesn't seem new to me, but if it's new to them, let them enjoy it."

During the emo revival, music scholars began to consider emo music's relationship to misogyny and sexism. The emo revival was also notable for revelations of sexual harassment and assault committed by members of emo bands, such as Brand New, leading to a wider conversation about sexism within emo scenes.
