= Gingerbee =

Internet screamo band

- Genres: Bedroom skramz; jazz pop
- Years active: 2022–2026
- Label: Self-released
- Past members: Dani Giguere; Gustavo Nome; Melody Sohani; James Witte-Cook; Nicholas Garza
- Website: gingerbee.bandcamp.com

Gingerbee was an internet screamo band formed in April of 2022. Throughout its existence, the band members were Dani Giguere (vocals, lyrics, and guitar), Gustavo Nome (guitar, bass), Melody Sohani (drums, synthesizer), James Witte-Cook (sax, backing vocals), and Nicholas Garza (violin).

== History ==
Gingerbee formed after the group met together in the Discord server Bedroom Skramz/DIY Jams. Following the groups formation, they soon self-released their debut single, "Raindrops," in August of 2022. Following minor attention that came from the release, they later released their debut extended play the following year, Our Skies Smile, in March. A few months later, they also collaborated with fellow internet bands lobster fight, Cicadahead, and godfuck to release the extended play a lobster, bee, & cicada walk into a bar and find god in August of the same year.

The band had started to receive a cult following after their collaboration extended-play, as they released their second single, "Petal Dance," in July of 2024. This song would be included in their debut album, Apiary, which was released in August of 2025. This release had been described to establish the band as 'a new contributor to 2020s emo canon,' due to the genre-blending elements of the album, that included many influences ranging from samba to chiptune.

Following success from their newly released album, the band would shortly after announce its disbandment following their final show in March of 2026, in Chicago's Thalia Hall. After their dissolution, the live album Gingerbee At Thalia Hall would be released in August of 2026, a collection of recordings from the live show.

== Influences ==
Critics have categorized Gingerbee's music as bedroom skramz and jazz pop.

The band have cited influences including Your Arms Are My Cocoon, Hey ILY, Lobsterfight, Weatherday, Glass Beach, the Brave Little Abacus and Car Seat Headrest.

== Discography ==
Studio albums

- Apiary (2025)

Live albums

- Gingerbee at Thalia Hall (2026)

Extended plays

- Our Skies Smile (2023)
- a lobster, bee, & cicada walk into a bar and find god (2023)

Singles

- Raindrops (2022)
- Petal Dance (2024)
