= Is This Band Emo? =

Website founded in 2014

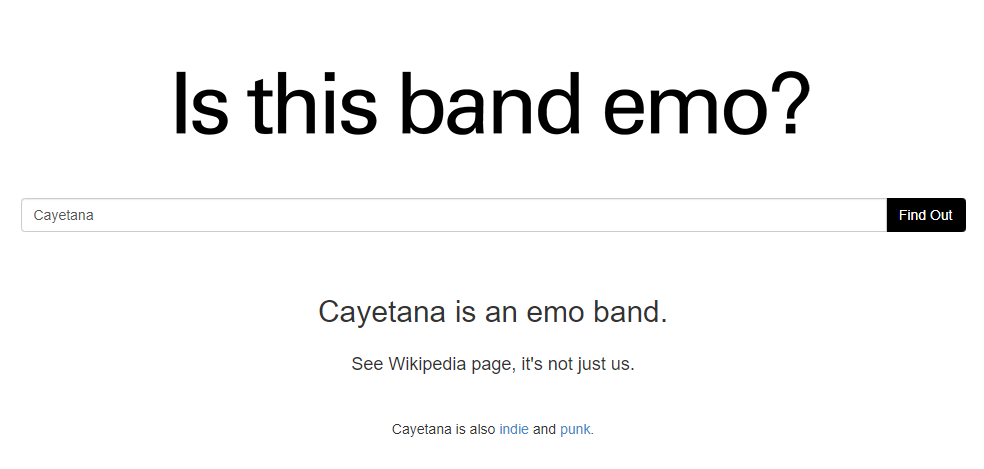
- Screenshot Is This Band Emo's page when searching for the band Cayetana
- Website type: Music, comedy, search engine
- Founded: 2014
- Founder: Tom Mullen
- Website: isthisbandemo.com
- Current status: Active

Is This Band Emo? is a website that classifies various bands and musicians based on whether they are included in the emo music genre, with some responses accompanied by comedic comments. Created by Tom Mullen, founder of the Washed Up Emo podcast and website, it is intended to inform about the history of emo music. It has been featured in various music publications such as Alternative Press, Consequence, and Rolling Stone.

== Origins ==
The emo genre formed in the Washington D.C. music scene as a subgenre of hardcore punk in the 1980s, before reaching mainstream popularity in the 1990s and 2000s. Tom Mullen, who had discovered the genre through the underground punk scenes, first created the blog Washed Up Emo in 2007 in response to its increasing mainstream prevalence. Likening emo's popularity in the 2000s to the "hair metal" genre, Mullen lamented what he perceived as the shifting legacy of the genre, noting how the mainstream press often emphasized and covered the genre's popularity and aesthetics in the decade, while overlooking the genre's hardcore punk origins and Midwest developments. Mullen later created the Is This Band Emo? site with various friends, musicians and writers around the world, facetiously called the Emo Council. He designed the logo for the council "in five seconds" based on the United Nations logo, and spent several months including bands with jokes on the site. The website launched in late 2014 and crashed on its first day, according to Mullen.

== Content ==
"What I try to do with the site is remind people that if you came in through MCR, if you came in through Armor for Sleep or Fall Out Boy, there's more… There's more for you to experience, and let me show you where."

— Tom Mullen discussing the purpose of the website.

The website functions as a basic search engine that generates a response on whether a band or musician is classified as emo or not emo. As opposed to an algorithm or artificial intelligence models, the decision for the bands is manually determined by the Emo Council, who collectively discuss and vote for their inclusion. Several of the responses include explanations on why a particular artist is or is not classified in the genre, often containing humorous and ironic commentary. Bands listed as emo on the site include Dashboard Confessional, Death Cab for Cutie, Jawbreaker, Taking Back Sunday, and The Promise Ring. Bands such as Fall Out Boy, My Chemical Romance, and The Used are listed as not emo on the website, despite their association with the Third Wave of the genre; searching My Chemical Romance yields the result "Unlike high school, emo has a history longer than four years" as of 2022. Bands not listed on the site may be requested through Twitter/X. The website also contains several Easter eggs and references, such as a reference to a Saturday Night Live sketch upon searching Weezer, Bernie Sanders listed as emo among indie and punk, and basketball players such as Kevin Durant. The site has received notice from Alternative Press, Consequence, and Rolling Stone, along with musicians such as Phoebe Bridgers. Similar websites, Is This Band Punk? Is This Band Metal?, Is This Band Hardcore?, and Is This Band Indie? were also created by Washed Up Emo to educate music listeners and encourage exploration of these alternative music genres.

== See also ==
- List of emo artists
