= Foxtails (band) =

American screamo band

- Origin: Monroe, Connecticut
- Genres: Screamo; post-hardcore; math rock
- Years active: 2015–present
- Members: Blue Luno Solaz; June Benham; Jared Schmidt; Michael Larocca
- Past members: Josh Garcia
- Website: foxtails.co

Foxtails is an American screamo band from Monroe, Connecticut. The band currently consists of Blue Luno Solaz (vocals and bass), June Benham (guitar), Michael Larocca (drums), and Jared Schmidt (violin). All four members of the band are nonbinary, and use they/them pronouns. The band released their debut album This Is Not for You (stylized in all lowercase) in 2015.

== History ==
Foxtails was founded by Blue Luno Solaz, June Benham, Michael Larocca, and Josh Garcia. The four met while attending the Regional Center for the Arts, a performing arts high school in Trumbull, Connecticut. During their junior year, Benham began recruiting members to form a band, and invited Larocca to audition. Larocca, then a freshman, initially declined the offer, but later auditioned and successfully joined a year later. They later recruited Blue Luno Solaz on vocals and Josh Garcia on bass.

Following the release of their 2015 debut This Is Not for You (stylized in all lowercase) Garcia briefly switched to playing guitar, before returning to bass, and subsequently leaving the band. The band continued as a three-piece, with Solaz playing bass on their 2017 sophomore record Ill. The album was recorded at Dead Air Studios in Amherst, Massachusetts, and was produced by Orchid guitarist Will Killingsworth. The band went on to release their third record Querida Hija (stylized in all lowercase) in 2019, which was their first to feature a song entirely in Spanish. Solaz cited inspiration from bands such as Amygdala, Lord Snow, Entierralos, and Massa Nera, that "bring Latinx voices to the forefront and aren’t afraid to speak in Spanish".

In 2022, Foxtails released their fourth album Fawn (stylized in all lowercase), the first to feature violinist Jared Schmidt. The record was mixed and produced by Steve Roche (Off Minor, Saetia), and recorded at Permanent Hearing Damage studio in Philadelphia, Pennsylvania. Fawn received positive reviews from publications including Sputnikmusic, Stereogum, Paste Magazine, and Brooklyn Vegan.

The band's latest release is their 2024 extended play Home (stylized in all lowercase). Home was the band's first release to be mixed by vocalist/bassist Blue Luno Solaz. All of the proceeds made in the first week of sales were donated to the Sylvia Rivera Law Project, a charity which provides legal funds for transgender, intersex, and gender-nonconforming individuals who are low-income or people of color.

== Members ==
Current

- Blue Luno Solaz (vocals, bass)
- June Benham (guitar)
- Michael Larocca (drums)
- Jared Schmidt (violin)

Past

- Josh Garcia (bass)

== Discography ==
Studio Albums

- This Is Not for You (2015)
- Ill (2017)
- Querida Hija (2019)
- Fawn (2022)

Singles & EPs

- O Tempora! O Mores! (2016)
- Split (2018)
- Violeta (2022)
- Home (2024)
