= Jank (band) =

American midwest emo band

- Origin: Philadelphia, Pennsylvania, U.S.
- Genres: Indie rock; pop punk; emo; math rock
- Years active: 2015–2016
- Labels: Creep; Honest Face
- Spinoffs: Little Tyrant; Fail Better Heal Faster; Exilius Bliss
- Spinoff of: Panucci's Pizza
- Past members: Lou Diamond; Ruben Polo; Sam Becht

Jank (stylized as JANK or J A N K !) were an American DIY band from Philadelphia, Pennsylvania. It formed in 2015 following the disbanding of vocalist Lou Diamond's previous group, Panucci's Pizza, and was dissolved in 2016 due to sexual assault allegations against Diamond.

== History ==
Jank formed following the break-up of Downingtown, Pennsylvania duo Panucci's Pizza, which consisted of Lou (formerly Matt) Diamond and Blair Benzel. During Panucci's tenure, Diamond had been introduced to bassist Ruben Polo through mutual friends in the Philadelphia DIY scene, and they later met drummer Sam Becht during the trio's studies at the University of the Arts. After Diamond's other projects disbanded, they decided to start a new band containing light-hearted, tongue-in-cheek lyrics and upbeat, energetic instrumentals, in contrast to the emotional lyricism and acoustic instrumentation of Panucci's Pizza.

Jank released their debut album, Awkward Pop Songs, in 2015 via Honest Face Records and Funeral Sounds.

In early 2016 they recorded a new EP called Versace Summer. The band self-released a remixed version of Awkward Pop Songs, entitled Awkward Chopped Songs, on July 5, 2016, before releasing Versace Summer on July 27, 2016, through Creep Records. The album was named one of Vice's "100 Best Albums of 2016".

== Breakup and aftermath ==
Following the release of Versace Summer, Diamond was accused of sexual assault, causing bassist Ruben Polo to leave the band. After Diamond and drummer Sam Becht released a new album under the name Fail Better, Heal Faster, a Reddit user made further allegations of assault by Diamond, including that of an underage girl.

Polo played guitar in the hardcore punk band Soul Glo until 2022, when he himself was accused of sexual assault and departed the band. Meanwhile, Becht joined the band Remo Drive as a touring drummer, and in 2019 he joined a new band called Oolong.

== Members ==
- Lou Diamond – guitar, vocals (2015–2016)
- Ruben Polo – bass guitar (2015–2016)
- Sam Becht – drums (2015–2016)

== Discography ==
Studio albums

- Awkward Pop Songs (Honest Face Records, 2015)

EPs

- Versace Summer (Creep Records, 2016)

Remix albums

- Awkward Chopped Songs (Self-released, 2016)

Compilation Albums

• B-Sides and Dem-Os (Self-released, 2021)
