= Computerwife =

Computerwife is the solo project of Addie Warncke. She is based in New York City.

She released her debut album Computerwife in 2023.
