= Your Arms Are My Cocoon =

American musical group

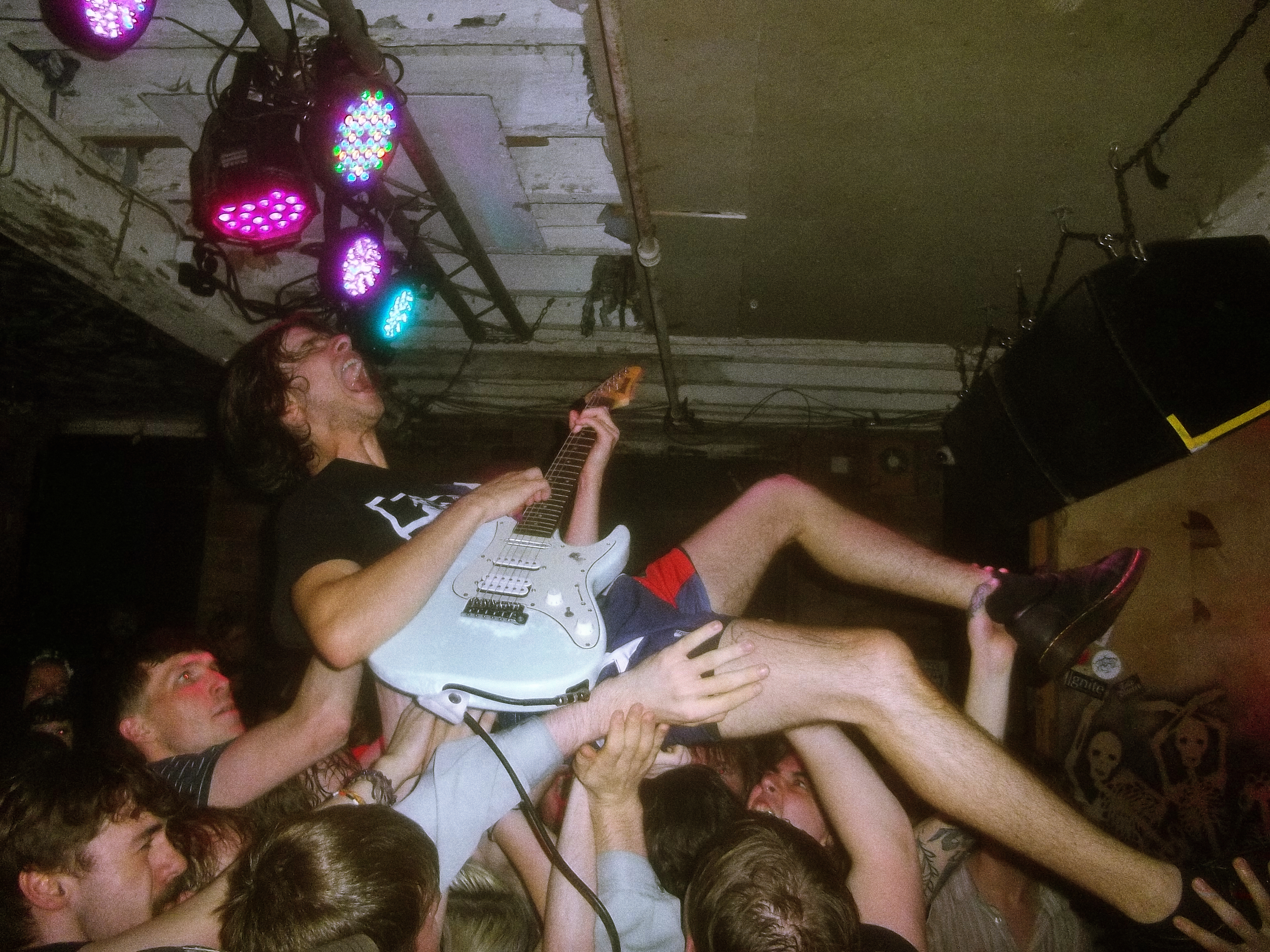
- Your Arms Are My Cocoon performing live in 2024

Background information
- Origin: Katy, Texas, United States
- Genres: Bedroom skramz, emo
- Years active: 2020–present
- Members: Tyler Odom; Dom Baylock; Alyssa Mandel; Naser Mansour

Your Arms are my Cocoon (abbreviated as YAAMC) is an American experimental screamo project created by musician Tyler Odom based in Chicago, Illinois. The project is known for merging bedroom pop influences with the harshness of screamo.

== Career ==
=== Origins and self-titled EP (2020–2023) ===
Odom launched the project in 2020, with his debut EP release Your Arms are my Cocoon, which was recorded in his bedroom in Katy, Texas prior to his move to Chicago. He submitted the demos for the EP to Isaiah "Kit" Carson, who released the EP on a limited set of fifty cassette tapes on Sun Eater.

Early in the project, Odom toured on his own with backing tracks played from his laptop. He stated that he "hated the way the backing tracks sounded, and I hated the way the live sets as a whole sounded". Through social media, Odom recruited other musicians to be able to play as a full live band.

=== Live band and death of a rabbit (2024–present) ===
Following the formation of a full band, Your Arms are My Cocoon toured globally with Awakebutstillinbed and Algae Bloom. In 2024 the band self-released their debut album death of a rabbit. The release was noted to retain the low-fi production style that Odom had established, but was noted by critics to be fuller in sound with elements of maximalism. The album featured a wide range of instrumentation including banjos, acoustic guitars and layered screamed vocals.

== Musical style ==
Considered part of the "5th wave emo" movement, Your Arms are My Cocoon is known for blending elements of screamo and emo music with a low-fi production approach typical of bedroom pop. This style has colloquially been referred to as "bedroom skramz".

Odom has cited the artists The Brave Little Abacus and Bedbug as main influences to his style, adding that “I was just making something that I had kind of envisioned in my head for a long time. While I was making it, I just considered it like my emo project.”

Reviewers have praised the emotional depth and rawness of Odom's lyricism, with noted themes including heartbreak, loss, and internal growth.
