= Awakebutstillinbed =

Stage-name of American musician Shannon Taylor

awakebutstillinbed
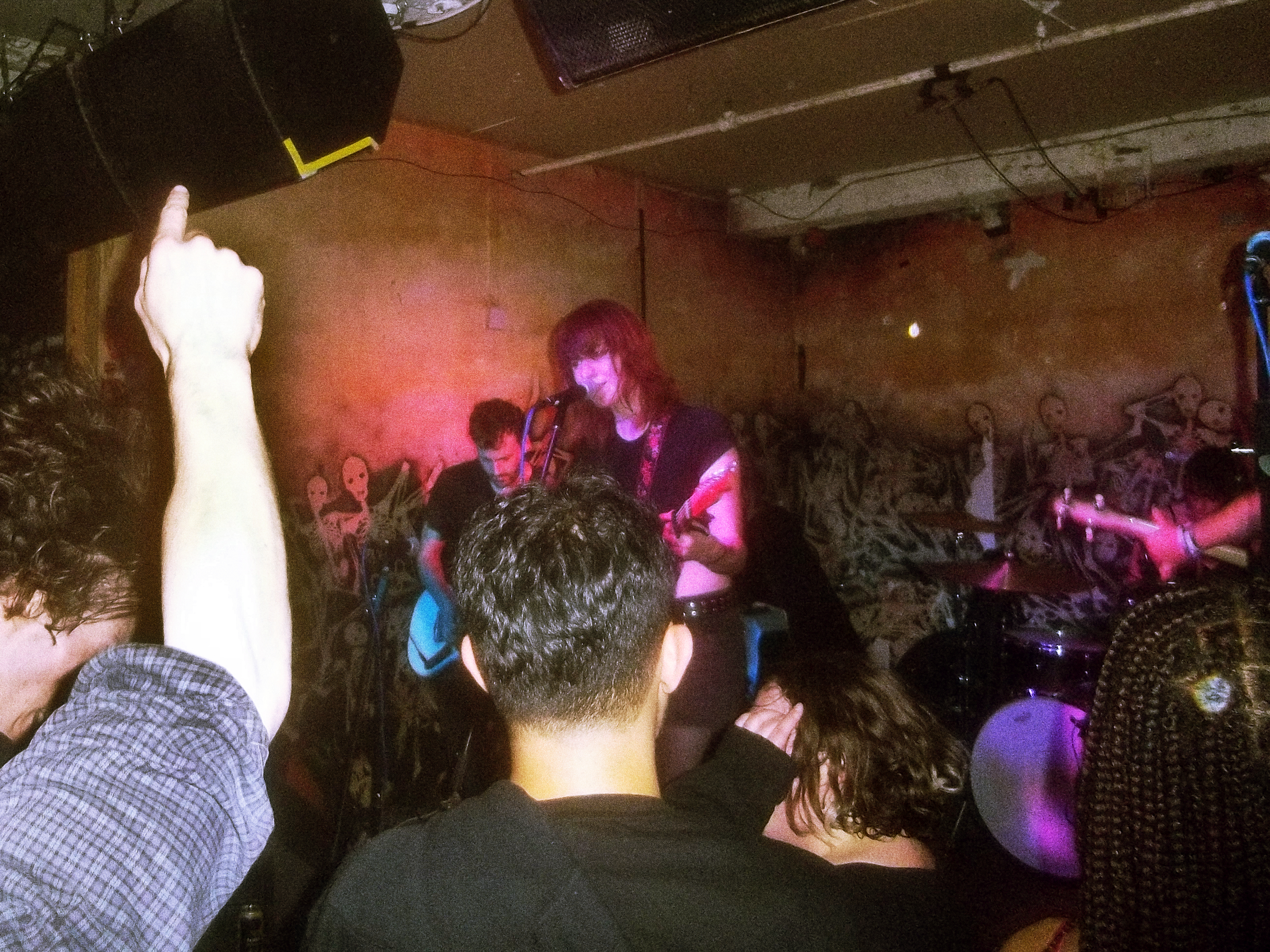
- Awakebutstillinbed performing live in 2024

Background information
- Origin: San Jose and Berkeley, California, U.S.
- Genres: Midwest emo; math rock; post-hardcore; alternative rock
- Years active: 2017–present
- Labels: Tiny Engines; Twelve Gauge Records
- Members: Shannon Taylor; Brendan Gibson; Erik Lobo; Alex Botkin; Marcy Krasnova
- Past members: Borin Bou; Ben Truong; Elijah Stoll; Angeles Garcia jpegstripes Cat Egbert; Jason Hallyburton; Erik Lobo
- Website: www.facebook.com/awakebutstillinbed

Awakebutstillinbed, stylized as awakebutstillinbed, and abbreviated as absib, is the solo project of American musician Shannon Taylor.

== History ==
Taylor (born November 13, 1991) grew up in Mesquite, Texas, a suburb of Dallas, Texas. Taylor later moved from Mesquite to York, Pennsylvania with her family at the age of fifteen. Later, Taylor moved to San Jose, California, where she currently resides. In January 2018, Taylor released her first album as awakebutstillinbed titled What People Call Low Self-Esteem Is Really Just Seeing Yourself the Way That Other People See You. The album was re-released on Tiny Engines upon Taylor's signing with the label in February. The album received a 7.7 out of 10 rating from Pitchfork. The album was featured at number 98 on Brooklyn Vegan's list titled "100 Best Punk & Emo Albums of the 2010s". The band was named after a lyric from the song "Maine" off of the album State Songs by John Linnell.

== Members ==
Current members

- Shannon Taylor – vocals, guitar, bass (2017–present)
- Brendan Gibson - guitar, keyboard, backing vocals (2020–present)
- Alex Botkin - bass (2023–present)
- Marcy Krasnova - drums (2024–present)

Past members

- Borin Bou - guitar (2017–2020)
- Ben Truong - bass (2017–2020)
- Elijah Stoll - drums, backup vocals (2017–2020)
- Angeles Garcia - bass, backing vocals (2020–2022)
- jpegstripes - drums, synth, piano (2020–2022)
- Cat Egbert - drums (2020–2022)
- Jason Hallyburton - drums (2020–2022)
- Erik Lobo - drums, backing vocals (2022–2024)

== Discography ==
Albums

- what people call low self-esteem is really just seeing yourself the way that other people see you (Tiny Engines, 2018)
- chaos takes the wheel and i am a passenger (Tiny Engines, 2023)

EPs and Splits

- stay who you are (self-released, 2020)
- Hymns for the Scorned (Twelve Gauge Records, 2022) - split EP with For Your Health
- fourwaysplit w/ Aren't We Amphibians, california cousins, and Your Arms Are My Cocoon (2025)

Singles

- "Life" (2017)
- "me (The 1975 cover)" (2020)
- "Ride" (2022)
- "Airport/Redlight" (2023)
- "far" (2023)
- "Clearview" (2023)

Compilation appearances'

- Grave Neighbors v.2 (2018)
- Don't Stop Now II: A Collection of Covers (2018)
- 12 Days of Chillmas (Vol. 3) (2020)
- we share the same insects: an i became birds tribute compilation (2023)
