= List of Midwest emo bands =

This is a list of Midwest emo bands. This is not a list of emo bands from the Midwestern United States, but bands that are a part of the specific Midwest emo genre.

== A ==
- A Great Big Pile Of Leaves
- Algernon Cadwallader
- American Football
- The Anniversary
- Anxious
- The Appleseed Cast
- Arm's Length
- Aren't We Amphibians
- Arrows in Her

== B ==
- Balance and Composure
- Barely Civil
- Ben Quad
- Boys Life
- Braid
- The Brave Little Abacus

== C ==
- Camping in Alaska
- Canadian Softball
- Cap'n Jazz
- The Cardboard Swords
- Carly Cosgrove
- The Casper Fight Scene
- Chamberlain
- Charmer
- Cherry Cola Champions
- Chinese Football
- Christie Front Drive
- Cliffdiver
- Crash Of Rhinos
- CSTVT

== D ==
- Dads
- Dear Cincinnati
- Dear Maryanne
- Dikembe
- Dogleg
- Dowsing

== E ==
- Empire! Empire! (I Was a Lonely Estate)
- Everyone Asked About You
- Everyone Everywhere
- Excuse Me, Who Are You?

== F ==
- First Day Back
- Football, etc.
- Forests
- Foxing
- Foxtails
- Frat Mouse
- Free Throw
- The Front Bottoms
- Further Seems Forever

== G ==
- Gauge
- The Get Up Kids
- Ghosts and Vodka
- Glocca Morra
- Gods Reflex
- Gulfer

== H ==
- Harrison Gordon
- Hop Along
- Home Is Where
- Holden Place
- Hot Mulligan
- The Hotelier

== I ==
- Into It. Over It.

== J ==
- Jank
- Jets to Brazil
- Joan of Arc
- Joie De Vivre
- Joyce Manor
- Just Neighbors

== K ==
- Kittyhawk
- Knapsack

== L ==
- Laughing Matter
- Lifted Bells
- Live Tetherball Tonight

== M ==
- Macseal
- Marietta
- Melanie
- Merchant Ships
- Michael Cera Palin
- Midwest Pen Pals
- Mineral
- Modern Baseball
- Modest Mouse
- Mom Jeans
- MooseCreek Park
- Mush

== N ==
- Nai Harvest
- Newfound Interest in Connecticut

== O ==
- Oakwood
- The Obsessives
- Ogbert the nerd
- Oliver Houston
- Oolong
- Origami Angel
- Oso Oso
- OWEL
- Owls

== P ==
- Party Hats
- Perspective, a Lovely Hand to Hold
- Pet Symmetry
- Pianos Become the Teeth
- Pinegrove
- Pity Sex
- Prince Daddy & the Hyena
- The Promise Ring

== R ==
- Rainer Maria
- Red Sun
- Remember Sports
- Retirement Party

== S ==
- Saturdays At Your Place
- Signals Midwest
- Slaughter Beach, Dog
- Snowing
- Sorority Noise
- Street Smart Cyclist
- Sunny Day Real Estate
- Sweet Pill

== T ==
- Townhouse
- Texas Is the Reason
- The World Is a Beautiful Place & I Am No Longer Afraid to Die
- Their / They're / There
- This Town Needs Guns
- Thoughts On Bowling
- Tigers Jaw
- Tiny Moving Parts
- Tiny Voices
- Title Fight
- Train Breaks Down
- TRSH

== V ==
- The Van Pelt
- Vs Self

== W ==
- Waterpistol
- Worst Party Ever

== Y ==
- Yeesh
- You Blew It!
