= Feeling Not Found =

Studio album by Origami Angel
- Released: September 27, 2024
- Genres: Pop-punk, emo, easycore
- Length: 40:25
- Label: Counter Intuitive
- Producer: Will Yip

Origami Angel chronology
The Brightest Days (2023)	Feeling Not Found (2024)

Singles from Feeling Not Found
- 1. "Fruit Wine" Released: May 6, 2024; 2. "Dirty Mirror Selfie / Where Blue Light Blooms" Released: July 24, 2024; 3. "Wretched Trajectory" Released: August 21, 2024; 4. "Sixth Cents (Get It?) / secondgradefoofight" Released: September 17, 2024

Feeling Not Found is the third studio album by American pop punk band Origami Angel. It was released on September 27, 2024.

== Background and recording ==
Band members Ryland Heagy (vocals, guitars, bass) and Pat Doherty (drums) began work on the album as early as 2020, despite a multitude of releases by the band between 2020 and 2023. The band began recording demos for the album in 2020, and while Heagy liked the material's shared thematic and sonic ties, he felt it wasn't quite ready for release. Heagy noted that he felt they could get the songs about 80% complete, but struggled to get them to the 100% level. The material was set aside while they worked on recording a sprawling double album, Gami Gang (2021), and the mixtape The Brightest Days (2023).

The band revisited the material in 2023. In January 2023, Heagy's cousin - a fellow musician and big influence on Heagy - died. Heagy recounted that the last thing they talked about prior to his death was Heagy informing him that Origami Angel was to begin working with music producer by Will Yip for the album. His cousin was very excited for the band, making the recording sessions with Yip particularly meaningful for Heagy.

== Themes and composition ==
The album is a concept album. Thematically, the album's title is a play on phrase "file not found". The band describes the album's concept as an exploration of an "emotional and spiritual 404 error, a sensation of cellular-level malfunction and data corruption, of being lost in an oblivion of digital information, and the desperate struggle to reconnect to how it feels to be human and whole." A recurring theme is society's overreliance on social media and the internet in a quickly changing world, and being "too online". Heagy expanded on the concept:

"The narrative of this record isn’t necessarily an honest narration. A lot of it is very ambiguous and confused. And I think that’s really what the main ethos of the whole spiritual error thing is: a lot of bad shit has happened in the past four years – especially related to how digitised and disconnected pretty much everything is. I'm just like, 'I don't know what to do.'"

Appealing to nostalgia as a reaction to stressful modern times is another recurring theme across the album. The track "HM07 Waterfall" is a reference to Pokemon, specifically a battle move with the video games. Darker themes include album opener "Lost Signal" being about Heagy's grief experienced from the death of his cousin, while "Sixth Cents (Get It?)" is a criticism of the modern music industry, and the lengths an artist must go to market themselves.

Musically, the album has been described as moving in and out of many styles, while more generally being in the vein of pop punk and emo. Paste described the album as a "high-energy [20]00'... pop-punk sound" that "occasionally flirts with hardcore, post-punk and ska influences. "Fruit Wine" was described as "chaotically grungey". "Dirty Mirror Selfie" was described as "pop punk" with "metallic riffs and a blistering breakdown". The album features production by Will Yip.

== Release and promotion ==
Prior to the announcement of the album, the band released the single "Fruit Wine" on May 6, 2024. The album's name, Feeling Not Found, and release date of September 27, 2024, was first announced on July 24, 2024. The album will be announced via Counter Intuitive Records. Two singles were released on the same day – "Dirty Mirror Selfie" and "Where Blue Light Blooms" – along with accompanying music videos directed by Kay Dargen. The band later released a joint music video that spanned both songs "Sixth Sense" and "Secondgradefoodfight" where the band paid visual tribute to rock musicians such as Green Day, Phoebe Bridgers, and Modern Baseball.

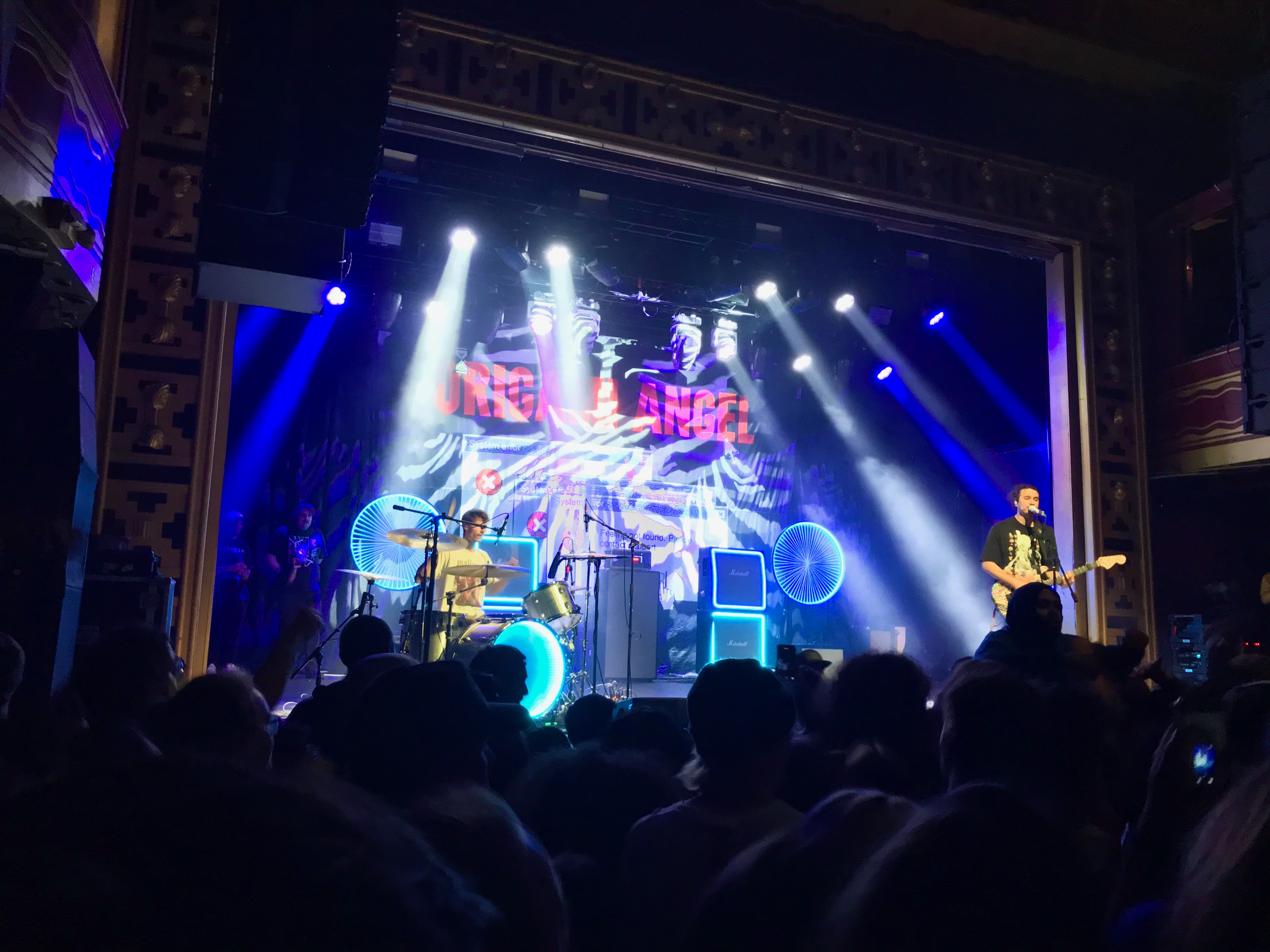
Origami Angel performing at Webster Hall in November 2024, for the end of the tour

The band embarked on a tour with US alternative rock band Microwave leading up to the album's release. Following release, the band promoted the album with a tour with Arm's Length and Macseal.

== Reception ==
The album was generally well-received by critics. It was named Stereogum's album of the week upon its release, with the publication concluding that "Brash, sharp, and innovative, Feeling Not Found is an exemplary portrait of the state of pop-punk in 2024" Paste praised the album for "spinning economic, political and interpersonal disillusionment into raucous hooks" and concluded that "It's a logical continuation of everything that made longtime listeners fall in love with their sound on 2019’s Somewhere City and 2021’s Gami Gang—but even better. Heagy and Doherty are more in-sync with one another than ever before.

== Track listing ==
Feeling Not Found track listing
No.	Title	Length
1.	"Lost Signal"	1:24
2.	"Dirty Mirror Selfie"	3:37
3.	"Where Blue Light Blooms"	3:20
4.	"Viral"	2:39
5.	"Underneath My Skin"	2:38
6.	"Wretched Trajectory"	2:46
7.	"AP Revisionist History"	2:53
8.	"Living Proof"	3:16
9.	"Fruit Wine"	2:51
10.	"Sixth Cents (Get It?)"	2:15
11.	"Secondgradefoodfight"	2:17
12.	"HM07 Waterfall"	3:01
13.	"Higher Road"	3:13
14.	"Feeling Not Found"	4:15
Total length:		40:25

== Personnel ==
- Ryland Heagy – vocals, guitars, bass
- Pat Doherty – drums
