= Kobayashi Maru (disambiguation) =

Kobayashi Maru is a training exercise in the fictional Star Trek universe.

Kobayashi Maru may also refer to:

- "Kobayashi Maru", the first fourth season episode of the American television series Star Trek: Discovery
- The Kobayashi Maru (novel), a 1989 Star Trek science fiction novel by Julia Ecklar
- "Kobayashi Maru (My Very Own)", a song from the 2023 mixtape The Brightest Days by Origami Angel

== See also ==
- "Kobayashi", a first-season episode of the American animated television series Star Trek: Prodigy
- Kobayashi (disambiguation)
- Maru (disambiguation)
- Kobyashi Naru, 1987 adventure video game
