= Cosmic Thrill Seekers =

2019 sophomore album by Prince Daddy & the Hyena

Studio album by Prince Daddy & The Hyena
- Released: June 28, 2019
- Recorded: January & February 2019
- Studio: Ponderosa, Horse County, New Jersey
- Genre: Indie rock; pop punk; emo pop
- Length: 40:43
- Label: Counter Intuitive Records
- Producer: Nick "Scoops" Dardaris

Prince Daddy & The Hyena chronology
I Thought You Didn't Even Like Leaving (2016)	Cosmic Thrill Seekers (2019)	Prince Daddy & The Hyena (2022)

Singles from Cosmic Thrill Seekers
- 1. "Lauren (Track 2)" Released: April 26, 2019; 2. "The Prototype of the Ultimate Lifeform" Released: May 17, 2019; 3. "C'mon and Smoke Me Up" Released: June 7, 2019

Cosmic Thrill Seekers is the second studio album by American rock band Prince Daddy & The Hyena, released June 28, 2019 through Counter Intuitive Records. It was recorded at Ponderosa studios in Horse County, New Jersey with producer Nick "Scoops" Dardaris during January and February 2019.

Lead vocalist Kory Gregory states that the writing of the album took place over five years, including a full demo session recorded at University of North Carolina Asheville's studio through drummer Daniel Gorham's enrollment in their audio engineering program.

== Background ==
Much of the album's lyrical content was written while vocalist and guitarist Kory Gregory had been suffering from severe anxiety following an acid trip.

During the trip, you can convince yourself to give it however many hours and it'll be gone. But when two weeks go by and you're still having little panic attacks about it. It starts to weigh on your mind: Did I permanently pollute my thought process and my appreciation and excitement for life?

Conceptually, the record mirrors The Wizard of Oz split into three acts: The Heart, The Brain, and The Roar. "We just want to make it sound like the soundtrack to a Disney film played by a punk rock band," says Gregory, citing My Chemical Romance and Green Day as influences.

== Track listing ==
All tracks are written by Kory Gregory.

No.	Title	Length
1.	"I Lost My Life"	3:25
2.	"Lauren (Track 2)"	3:26
3.	"Fuckin' A"	1:22
4.	"Dialogue"	2:26
5.	"Cosmic Thrill Seeking Forever"	4:53
6.	"Slip"	2:46
7.	"The Prototype of the Ultimate Lifeform"	2:22
8.	"Breather"	2:15
9.	"Ursula Merger"	3:11
10.	"Dream Nails"	1:07
11.	"C'mon & Smoke Me Up"	1:55
12.	"Trying Times"	3:42
13.	"Klonopin"	2:08
14.	"Wacky Misadventures of the Passenger"	5:49
Total length:		40:43
