= Runaway Dog =

Studio album by Retirement Party
- Released: May 15, 2020
- Genre: Punk rock, indie rock, pop punk
- Length: 34:37
- Label: Counter Intuitive Records

Retirement Party chronology
Somewhat Literate (2018)	Runaway Dog (2020)	Retirement Party (2022)

Runaway Dog is the second album by Chicago rock band Retirement Party, released on May 15, 2020, through Counter Intuitive Records.

== Critical reception ==
Professional ratings
Review scores
Source	Rating
Exclaim!	7/10
Chicago Tribune	4/4
Pitchfork	6.9/10

Exclaim!'s Adam Feibel gave the album a positive review, saying it "leaps out of the speakers with booming, upbeat power-pop, and the band makes a way bigger racket than you'd ever expect a trio to be able to make.". The Chicago Tribune gave it a 4/4.

== Track listing ==
All tracks are written by Retirement Party

No.	Title	Length
1.	"Runaway Dog"	4:01
2.	"Compensation"	2:23
3.	"Old Age"	4:46
4.	"Fire Blanket"	3:12
5.	"No Tide"	3:30
6.	"I Wonder If They Remember You"	2:26
7.	"Ebb"	2:40
8.	"Better Off Now"	3:21
9.	"Afterthought"	3:48

== Personnel ==
Retirement Party

- Avery Springer – lead vocals and guitar
- James Ringness – drums
- Eddy Rodriguez – guitar/bass
