= Kobayashi (disambiguation) =

Kobayashi (小林, 古林) is a Japanese surname.

Kobayashi may also refer to:

== Places ==
- Kobayashi, Miyazaki, a city in Japan
- Kobayashi Station (disambiguation), multiple railway stations in Japan

Fictional locations

- Kobayashi, a planet in the Yakawa system of Mass Effect 2

== Other uses ==
- "Kobayashi", a 2022 episode of Star Trek: Prodigy
- Kobayashi, a jazz-meets-funk-meets-hip hop-meets-electronica band from Montreal.
- Kobayashi, a character in the 1995 film The Usual Suspects, played by Pete Postlethwaite

== See also ==
- Kobayashi Electronics, a corporation in the film Cyborg 2
- Kobayashi Maru (disambiguation)
  - "Kobayashi Maru", the fictional test in Star Trek
