= Just Friends (band) =

American funk rock band

- Origin: Dublin, California
- Genres: Funk rock, alternative rock, pop rap, emo, hardcore punk
- Years active: 2013–present
- Label: Pure Noise Records
- Members: Sam Kless; Brianda "Brond" Goyos Leon; Brandon Downum; Matt Yankovich; Avi Dey; Ben Donlon
- Past members: Sean Kenney; Chris Palowitch; Kevin Prochnow
- Website: http://jfcrewfanclub.com/

Just Friends (commonly known as Bay Area Party Ppl) is an American alternative rock band founded in Dublin, California, in 2013. Their style incorporates elements of punk, power pop, emo, funk, hip-hop, and jazz, blending these genres to create a unique, high-energy sound. They are currently based in the East Bay and signed to Pure Noise Records with whom they have released 4 studio albums.

== History ==
=== Formation ===
The band formed in early 2013 by Sam Kless in his parents' garage in Dublin, California. Enlisting help from his former high school marching band and jazz band classmates Just Friends began as a punk rock band, but quickly evolved, incorporating elements of funk, R&B, hip-hop, and power pop. While punk remains a core part of their identity, their sound is best described as a fusion of funky, high-energy power pop, rock, and beyond. Coming from diverse musical backgrounds, the band thrives on exploring different styles and pushing genre boundaries.

=== Rock to the Rhythm (2015-2016) ===
In 2015 the band released its first studio album, Rock to the Rhythm through Open Door Records. Their writing at the time was largely influenced by pop punk and emo bands like Jeff Rosenstock and Joyce Manor. The album showcased their raw, DIY energy, capturing the spirit of early punk and setting the foundation for the band's evolving sound. During this period, the band toured extensively across the U.S., including several DIY tours, and released a split with Prince Daddy & The Hyena in 2016. This marked the beginning of Just Friends' journey as an eclectic, genre-blending band.

=== Nothing but Love (2017-2019) ===
Nothing but Love marked a pivotal moment in Just Friends' evolution, both musically and as a band. In 2017, the band welcomed Brond as their new vocalist, whose dynamic vocal presence and energy brought a fresh, exciting layer to the band's sound. The addition of Brond played a key role in the creation of Nothing but Love, which was released in 2018 through Counter Intuitive Records. The album was a significant departure from their earlier punk rock influences, blending genres like punk, indie rock, R&B, funk, and more.

Nothing but Love received critical acclaim for its diverse and genre-blending sound, with many highlighting the chemistry between Brond and the rest of the band. The band embarked on extensive tours across the U.S., U.K., and Europe, and in early 2019, they signed with Pure Noise Records and re-released the album. Nothing but Love was supported by major tours, including sharing the stage with Mayday Parade, State Champs, and The Wonder Years on the first Sad Summer Fest. The album solidified Just Friends as one of the most exciting and unpredictable bands in the indie and punk scenes.

=== Hella (2020–2022) ===
Following the success of Nothing but Love, Just Friends began working on their next full-length album, Hella, their debut release on Pure Noise Records. Originally slated for release in 2020, the album faced multiple delays due to the COVID-19 pandemic. To maintain momentum and build excitement for the record, the band released a three-part EP series, JF Crew Vol. 1-3, throughout the pandemic. These releases showcased their evolving sound, leaning further into alternative hip-hop, indie rock, and '90s-inspired influences.

When Hella was finally released, it highlighted the band's continued genre-blending approach and featured several high-profile collaborations, including tracks with Hobo Johnson and Lil B. To celebrate the album, Just Friends embarked on The Love Letter Tour in March 2022, selling out multiple dates. Later that year, they hit the road again, joining Mom Jeans and Free Throw for a nationwide tour in the fall of 2022.

=== Gusher (2023–Present) ===
After the release of Hella, Just Friends continued to push their sound forward, embracing an even more eclectic mix of influences. In 2023, the band released their next album Gusher. This era saw Just Friends refining their signature blend of infectious hooks, explosive horn sections, and dynamic vocal performances.

In April 2024, Just Friends hit the road with Hot Mulligan, bringing their high-energy live show to a new audience. Later that year, in the fall of 2024, the band toured with Microwave and reunited with longtime friends Prince Daddy & The Hyena for a run of dates, marking a special moment in their history as they shared the stage once again.

== Band members ==
Current members

- Sam Kless - vocals, guitar, percussion (2013–Present)
- Brianda "Brond" Goyos Leon - vocals (2017–Present)
- Brandon Downum - guitar, vocals (2013–Present)
- Matt Yankovich - guitar (2014–Present)
- Avi Dey - trumpet, percussion, spd (2013–Present)
- Ben Donlon - drums, percussion (2013–Present)

Touring & Contributing members

- Luke Clingerman - bass (2024–present)
- Kent Soliday - bass (2013–2016, 2018; contributing musician on recordings since 2013-present)
- Eric Butler – trombone, vocals, percussion (2014–2020, 2025)
- Cody Furin – guitar (2024; music video director since 2021)
- Bart Starr - bass (2017–2019)
- Kory Gregory - bass (2016)
- Sean Kenney - drums (2013)

Past members

- Chris Palowitch - trombone, keyboards (2013–2021)
- Kevin Prochnow - bass (2013, 2019–2024)

== Discography ==
=== Studio albums ===
- Rock to the Rhythm (2015)
- Nothing but Love (2018)
- Hella (2022)
- Gusher (2023)

=== EPs and singles ===
- Nothing but Love Promo Tape (2017)
- Fever/Stupid - single (2019)
- JF Crew Volume 1-3 (2021)
