= Bare Minimum =

Bare Minimum or The Bare Minimum may refer to:

- Bare minimum Monday, an initiative where employees do the minimal amount of work necessary on Mondays
- "Bare Minimum", a 2022 song by Anna Clendening
- "Bare Minimum", a 2023 song by Jillian Rossi from the album Never Fully Loved
- The Bare Minimum, a 2018 EP by Kicksie
- "The Bare Minimum" (Battle for Dream Island), a 2026 web series episode
- "The Bare Minimum", a 2009 episode of Launch My Line
