= Best Buds (album) =

Studio album by Mom Jeans
- Released: July 3, 2016
- Recorded: late 2014–late 2015
- Studios: Home studio; The Panda Studios
- Genres: Midwest emo; indie rock
- Length: 36:11
- Language: English
- Labels: Fourth Row Records; Counter Intuitive Records
- Producers: Eric Butler; Ryan Ellery; Austin Carango; Gabriel Paganin; James Trevascus

Mom Jeans chronology
Allergic (2014)	Best Buds (2016)	Puppy Love (2018)

Singles from Best Buds
- 1. "Movember (with Sarah Levy)" Released: July 27, 2015

Best Buds is the debut studio album by American indie emo band Mom Jeans. It was self-released on July 3, 2016, by the label Fourth Row Records on digital and cassette tape. The album was re-released on vinyl in November 2016, when the band signed with Counter Intuitive Records. Though it received little attention when first released, the album became an influential release in the emo revival in the late 2010s, and gained a cult following. The album features a guest appearance from Sarah Levy of Pity Party.

== Background and release ==
Mom Jeans formed in early 2014 while the members Eric Butler and Austin Carango were still attending University of California, Berkeley. After releasing their second EP Allergic in July of the same year, Butler and Carango met Ryan Ellery in late 2014, and began working on the album in early 2015, with Ellery serving as executive producer and engineer. Butler has stated in interviews that they never intended to get famous, and that they were just friends having a good time doing what they loved.

== Writing and recording ==
All of the tracks for the album were written by lead vocalist and guitarist Eric Butler and backing vocalist and drummer Austin Carango. Additional writers include Sarah Levy, who wrote her verse for "Movember", and Eric Carr, who helped write the verses and chorus for "Edward 40hands".

The album was recorded in two separate places, with drums and Gabriel Paganin's bass being recorded at The Panda Studios in Fremont, California, and guitar and vocals being recorded at record producer and engineer Ryan Ellery's home.

=== Composition ===
Best Buds blends a mixture of genres and emotions, taking midwest emo, indie rock, and acoustic tracks to tell emotion, such as grief, depression, acceptance, and anger. Butler has denied that the album is intended to be only about heartbreak, instead sharing that the album is taken from his personal experiences, including a death of a close friend. The album is consistent with heavy guitar melodies and riffs, while also slowing down with raw acoustic tracks as well.

== Critical reception ==
Professional ratings
Review scores
Source	Rating
AllMusic	4/5 stars
The Alternative	Positive
New Noise Magazine	Positive
TheHardTimes	Excellent

Upon its release, Best Buds did not receive much attention, besides a small cult following within the emo revival community. Initial reviews were positive, but also skeptical, pointing out the similarity with other popular emo bands such as Modern Baseball and The Front Bottoms. The album was a success for the band, being their breakthrough release and has become one of the most influential albums of the 2010s emo scene. Butler has stated that the album is a "foundation" for the band, and that the album will remain one of his favorites' forever.

The album saw a surge in popularity in the early 2020s, as the songs, "Death Cup" and "Scott Pilgrim vs. My GPA", began reemerging and going viral on the social platform TikTok.

== Track listing ==
All tracks were written by Eric Butler and Austin Carango, with additional writers listed. All tracks were produced by Butler and Carango, along with Ryan Ellery and Gabriel Paganin. All tracks were mastered by James Trevascus.

Best Buds track listing
No.	Title	Writer(s)	Length
1.	"Death Cup"		4:36
2.	"Danger Can't"		3:34
3.	"Movember" (with Sarah Levy)	Sarah Levy	3:37
4.	"Edward 40hands"	Evan Carr	4:26
5.	"*Sobs Quietly*"		1:58
6.	"Poor Boxer Shorts"		3:53
7.	"Remy's Boyz"		3:00
8.	"Girl Scout Cookies"		3:46
9.	"Scott Pilgrim vs. My GPA"		3:59
10.	"Vape Nation"		3:04

== Personnel ==
=== Lead ===
- Eric Butler - lead vocals, lead guitar
- Austin Carango - backing vocals, drums
- Gabriel Paganin - bass guitar

=== Production ===
- Ryan Ellery - Record producer, engineer
- James Trevascus - Audio mixing
- Sarah Levy - feature vocals, songwriter ("Movember")
- Evan Carr - songwriter ("Edward 40hands")
