= Cliffdiver =

- Origin: Tulsa, Oklahoma, U.S.
- Genres: Midwestern emo; emo revival; pop punk
- Years active: 2018–2026 (haitus)
- Label: SideOneDummy Records

Cliffdiver was an emo band from Tulsa, Oklahoma. They released two albums, two EPs, and several singles. The band went on indefinite hiatus in 2026.

== Personnel ==
- Joey Duffy - vocals
- Briana Wright - vocals
- Matt Ehler - guitars, vocals
- Gilbert Erickson - guitars, vocals
- Tyler Rogers - bass
- Dony Nickles - saxophone, vocals
- Eliot Cooper - drums

Erickson and Nickles left the band after recording Birdwatching in 2024.

== Discography ==
Studio albums

- Birdwatching (2024)
- Exercise Your Demons (2022)

EPs

- C-SIDES (2026)
- At Your Own Risk (2019)
- Small Hours (2018)

Singles

- F.A.K.E. (2023)
- Oh Bondage, Up Yours! (feat. Stephen Egerton) (2023)
- Gas City (2020)
- The Water Temple Is Filled... (2020)

== See also ==
- List of Midwest emo bands
- Emo revival
