= Hobo Johnson =

American hip hop artist

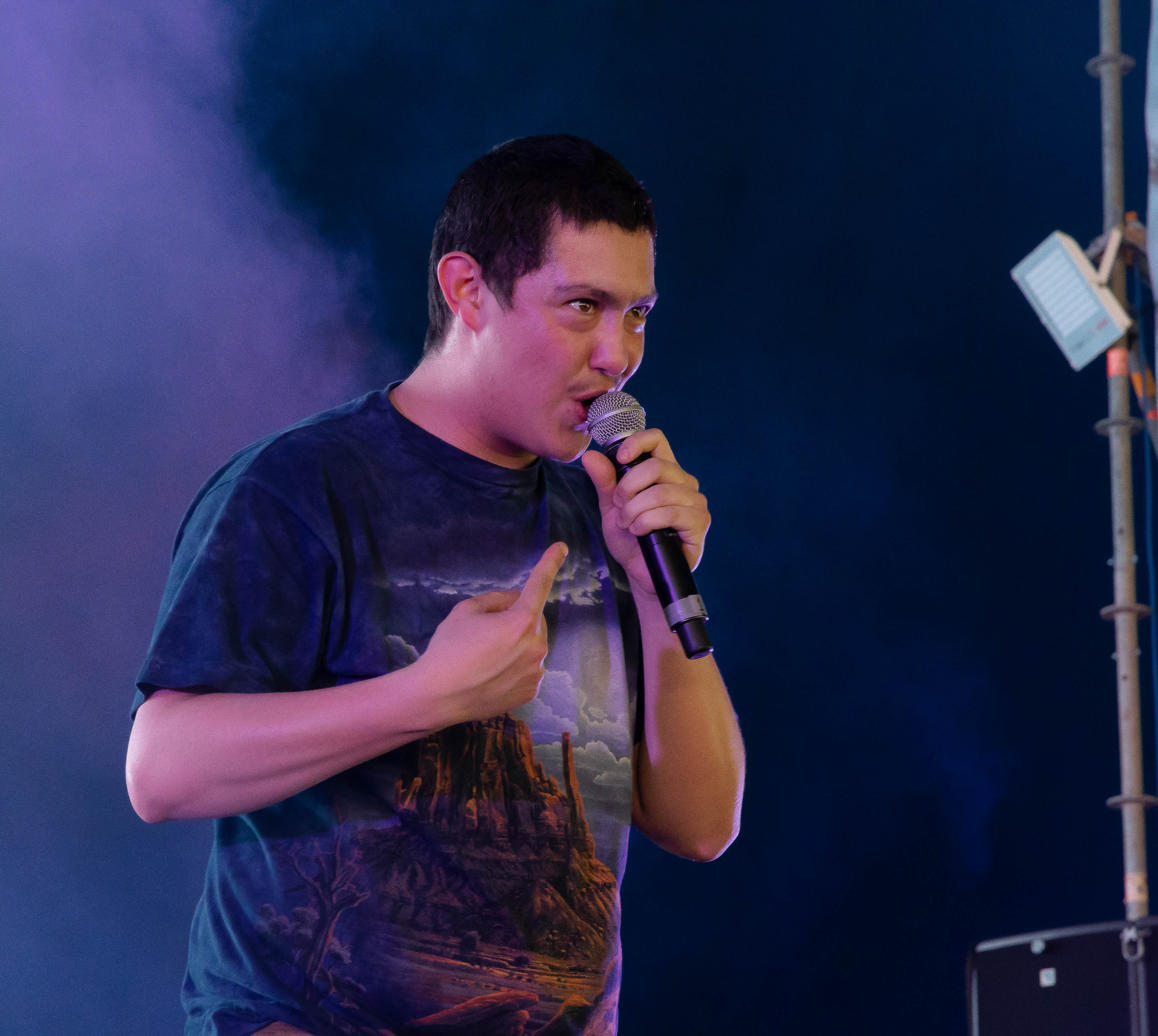
- Hobo Johnson performing at Falls Festival in Byron Bay, 2018

Background information
- Born: Frank Jorge Lopes Jr. December 22, 1994 (age 31)
- Genres: Emo rap; hip-hop; spoken word
- Occupation: Vocalist
- Years active: 2015–present
- Labels: Reprise; Warner
- Website: hobojohnson.com

Frank Jorge Lopes Jr. (born December 22, 1994), known professionally as Hobo Johnson, is an American vocalist and rapper, and the frontman of the band Hobo Johnson & the LoveMakers.

Hobo Johnson is known for his genre-bending music, with elements of hip-hop and spoken word.

== Early life ==
Lopes is a Mexican/Portuguese American from California. When he was 19, he was kicked out of his house by his father and subsequently lived in his car. For a stretch of time, Lopes worked at a pizza restaurant in Sacramento, but he soon quit to pursue his passion for music. He is a fan of the Sacramento Kings and has referenced them in the lyrics to his song "Sacramento Kings Anthem (We're Not That Bad)", written about the struggles the Kings have in the NBA.

== Music career ==
=== Early work and The Rise of Hobo Johnson (2015–2017) ===
At age 15, Lopes began performing hip-hop. He came up with his stage name "Homeless Johnson" but soon made it "Hobo Johnson" while living in his car, a 1994 Toyota Corolla, and named his 2015 debut album in honor of his car. Starting in December 2016, he released a series of live recordings on YouTube subtitled "Live from Oak Park". In 2018, Lopes drew criticism from the Sacramento chapter of Black Lives Matter, who accused him of using Oak Park's name without consent and of cultural appropriation. On May 12, they staged a small protest that delayed the beginning of his sold-out show at Sacramento's Ace of Spades nightclub.

"Peach Scone"
A 24-second sample of a live rendition of the single "Peach Scone." Hobo Johnson & the LoveMakers performed the song for the 2018 NPR Tiny Desk Contest. The video clip of the performance was filmed in a backyard and went viral.

In 2016, he released the album The Rise of Hobo Johnson independently, but later created a new version of the album in 2017 which had changes to the production and a different tracklist. After the release of the second version of The Rise of Hobo Johnson, Lopes signed to Reprise Records. That year, he won four Sacramento Area Music Awards: Artist of the Year, Best Hip-Hop/Rap, Best Emcee and Best New Artist.

=== Tiny Desk Concert, "Peach Scone", and The Fall of Hobo Johnson (2018–2019) ===
Hobo Johnson and the LoveMakers released a music video on Facebook as part of NPR's Tiny Desk Contest on March 7, 2018. The song "Peach Scone" collected millions of views in just a few weeks. Following the attention of the "Peach Scone" video, their album The Rise of Hobo Johnson charted at #11 on the Billboard Heatseekers Chart for the week ending March 31, 2018.

While not winning the Tiny Desk Contest, Hobo Johnson & the LoveMakers appeared on Tiny Desk on an episode released on September 12, 2018.

In 2018, the band toured North America and Europe and appeared at Australia's Falls Music & Arts Festival. In 2019, the band appeared at Bonnaroo Music and Arts Festival in Manchester, Tennessee.

In 2019 he released the singles "Typical Story" and "UglyKid" from the album The Fall of Hobo Johnson, which was released by Warner Records on September 13, 2019. That same day, EA Sports released the video game NHL 20, which featured the single "Typical Story" on its soundtrack.

=== The Revenge of Hobo Johnson, Hobo Johnson Alienates His Fanbase, and hiatus (2021–2024) ===
Lopes released the single "I Want to See the World" in June, 2021. He announced that the album The Revenge of Hobo Johnson would follow later that month. The Revenge of Hobo Johnson was subsequently released on June 23, 2021. On August 1, 2021 he released the album Hobo Johnson Alienates His Fanbase.

In 2022, Lopes canceled several upcoming tours and broke up the LoveMakers band, citing a focus on school over music.

In 2023, Lopes began performing shows again and released a new song on Instagram and YouTube, titled Sacramento 12 Step.

=== Hobo Johnson Drinks (2024) ===
In March of 2024, Hobo Johnson released a double single titled Hobo Johnson Drinks, featuring the songs "Dad's Bed" and "Metaverse" (stylized in all caps). The band released another two songs simultaneously on the 3rd of May titled "Flood The Earth Again" and "Jansports". Hobo Johnson then hosted a US tour which ran from June to August 2024.

Hobo Johnson announced the release of Hobo Johnson Drinks as a full album on May 9, 2025.

== Hobo Johnson & the LoveMakers ==
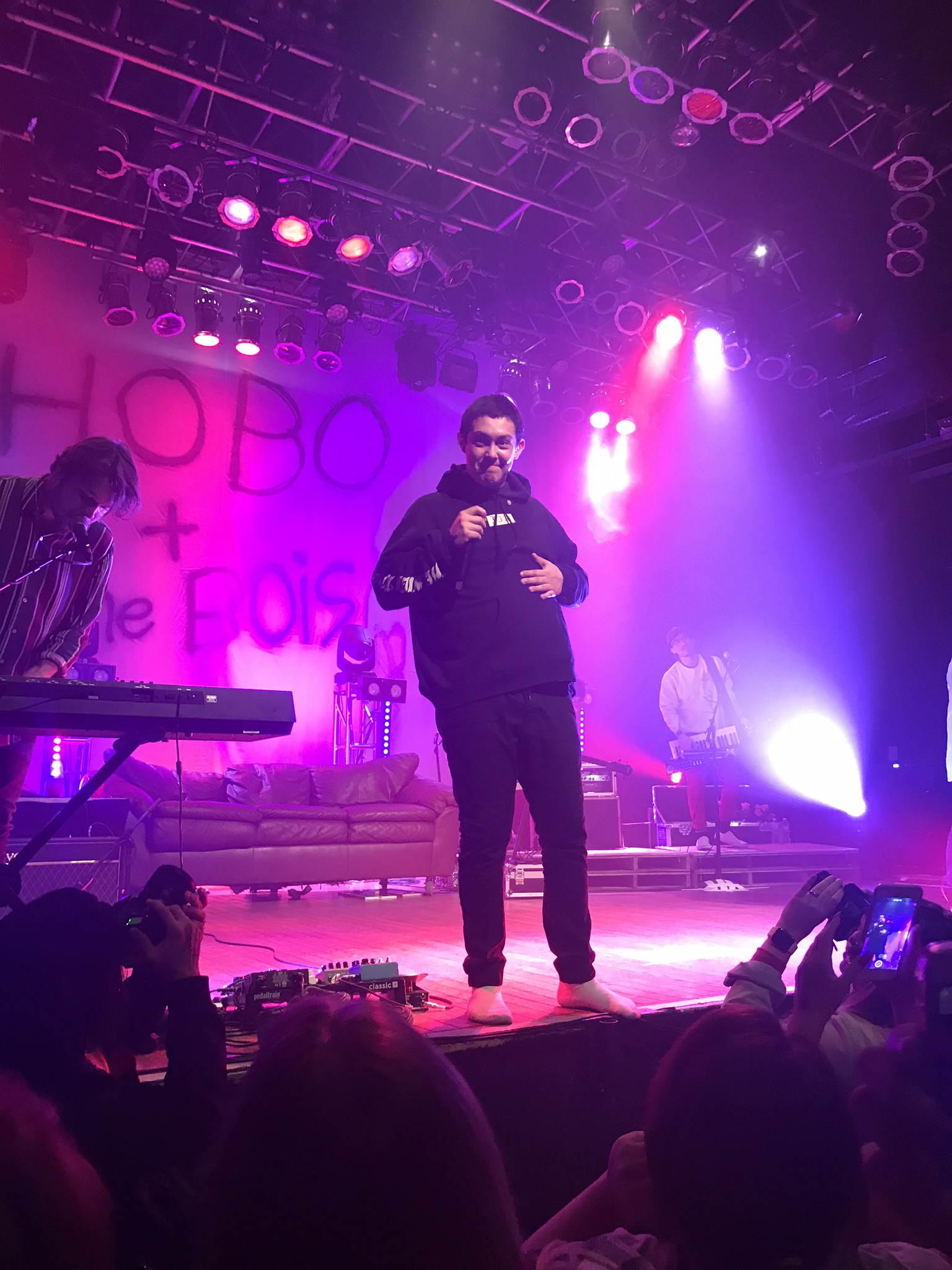
Hobo Johnson performing at the House of Blues in Cleveland, 2018

Current members

- Frank Lopes Jr. – lead vocals, guitar, keyboards, production
- Derek Lynch – guitar
- Jordan Moore – guitar, keyboards
- David Baez-Lopez – bass guitar
- Jmsey – keyboard, guitar

== Discography ==
Hobo Johnson discography
- Studio albums: 5
- Singles: 8
- Music videos: 14

=== Studio albums ===
Title	Details	Chart positions		
Title	Details	US	US Heat.	UK
Hobo Johnsons 94 Corolla	Released: October 14, 2015; Label: Self-released; Formats: Digital	—	—	—
The Rise of Hobo Johnson	Released: November 7, 2017 (Originally self-released in 2016); Label: Reprise; Formats: Digital, CD, vinyl	—	11	—
The Fall of Hobo Johnson	Released: September 13, 2019; Label: Warner; Formats: Digital, CD, vinyl	99	—	98
The Revenge of Hobo Johnson	Released: June 23, 2021; Label: Self-released; Formats: Digital	—	—	—
Hobo Johnson Alienates His Fanbase	Released: August 1, 2021; Label: Self-released; Formats: Digital, CD	—	—	—
Hobo Johnson Drinks!	Released: May 9, 2025; Label: Self-released; Formats: Digital	—	—	—

=== Singles ===
Title	Year	Chart positions		Album
Title	Year	US Alt.	US Rock	Album
"Peach Scone"	2018	—	—	Non-album single
"February 15th"	2018	—	—	The Fall of Hobo Johnson
"Typical Story"	2019	25	30	The Fall of Hobo Johnson
"Uglykid" (ft. Elohim)	2019	—	—	The Fall of Hobo Johnson
"Subaru Crosstrek XV"	2019	—	—	The Fall of Hobo Johnson
"I Want To See The World"	2021	—	—	The Revenge of Hobo Johnson
"I Want You Back"	2021	—	—	The Revenge of Hobo Johnson
"You want a Baby"	2021	—	—	The Revenge of Hobo Johnson

=== Music videos ===
Title	Year	Album	Director
"Sex in the City"	2017	The Rise of Hobo Johnson	Hobo Johnson
"Romeo & Juliet"	2017	The Rise of Hobo Johnson	Hobo Johnson
"Mario & Link"	2017	The Rise of Hobo Johnson	Frank Lopes, Derek Lynch, Jordan Moore
"Peach Scone"	2018	Non-album single	Hobo Johnson
"Father"	2018	The Rise of Hobo Johnson	Claire Marie Vogel
"DeMarcus Cousins & Ashley"	2018	The Rise of Hobo Johnson	Hobo Johnson
"Typical Story"	2019	The Fall of Hobo Johnson	Dan Ospal
"Uglykid" (ft. Elohim)	2019	The Fall of Hobo Johnson	Taylor Fauntleroy
"Subaru Crosstrek XV"	2019	The Fall of Hobo Johnson	Hobo Johnson & The Boys
"You & the Cockroach"	2019	The Fall of Hobo Johnson	Geoffrey C Knecht
"I want to see the World"	2021	The Revenge of Hobo Johnson	Adam Rioux
"I want you Back"	2021	The Revenge of Hobo Johnson	Hobo Johnson & The Boys
"You want a Baby"	2021	The Revenge of Hobo Johnson	Frank, D, and Fish
"Song 9 (The Government's Not Great)"	2021	The Revenge of Hobo Johnson	Hobo & the Bois

=== As a featured artist ===
Song	Year	Album	Artist
"Feb 20"	2018	A Tuesday Morning	Tel Cairo
"Mama's House"	2018	The Philharmonik	The Philharmonik
"Same Drugs"	2018	Non-album single	Jordan Moore & Jmsey
"No Toast"	2018	Obscura	Sparks Across Darkness
"See You Again - Live"	2018	Non-album single	Jmsey
"Tamales and Sadness"	2019	Pocket Buddha Mixtape	Pocket Buddha
"See You Again"	2019	Moments	Jmsey
"Color Out The Lines (Demo)"	2021	Non-album single	Peak Eyes
"Basic"	2022	Hella	Just Friends (ft. Lil B)
"Caretaker"	2022	Sawubona	Peak Eyes
"Color Out The Lines"	2022	Sawubona	Peak Eyes
