= Gami Gang =

Studio album by Origami Angel
- Released: April 30, 2021
- Genres: Emo; easycore
- Length: 51:21
- Label: Counter Intuitive
- Producer: Ryland Heagy

Origami Angel chronology
Somewhere City (2019)	Gami Gang (2021)	The Brightest Days (2023)

Gami Gang is the second studio album by emo band Origami Angel, It was released as a double LP by Counter Intuitive Records on April 30, 2021. The album was recorded and completed during the COVID-19 pandemic.

== Critical reception ==
Professional ratings
Review scores
Source	Rating
Pitchfork	7.3/10
Exclaim!	7/10

Writing for Pitchfork, Abby Jones enjoyed the album. She states that when the album is at its best, "It can feel limitless with ear-splitting power chords and double-bass drums paired with lighthearted humor and mathy elements." She also describes the album as "wistful", "daring", and "heartfelt".

== Track listing ==
Disc 1
No.	Title	Length
1.	"#GamiGang"	0:28
2.	"Self-Destruct"	3:00
3.	"Möbius Chicken Strip"	3:12
4.	"Noah Fence"	3:14
5.	"Mach Bike"	2:48
6.	"Isopropyl Alchemy"	3:24
7.	"You Wont."	2:42
8.	"Neutrogena Spektor"	2:55
9.	"Greenbelt Station"	1:59

Disc 2
No.	Title	Length
10.	"Bossa Nova Corps"	2:52
11.	"Kno U"	2:47
12.	"/trust"	3:07
13.	"[Spoons Rattling]"	1:23
14.	"Tom Holland Oates"	3:15
15.	"Caught in the Moment"	2:18
16.	"Dr. Fondoom"	1:13
17.	"Bed Bath & Batman Beyond"	0:55
18.	"Footloose Cannonball Brothers"	2:39
19.	"Blanket Statement"	2:06
20.	"GG"	4:54

== Personnel ==
- Ryland Heagy – guitar, bass, vocals, synthesizers, production, engineering
- Pat Doherty – drums, percussion
- Jake Checkoway - mixing, mastering
