= Everything Nice (EP) =

EP by Arm's Length
- Released: 25 February 2021
- Genre: Emo
- Length: 16:59
- Producer: Anton DeLost

Arm's Length chronology
What's Mine Is Yours (2019)	Everything Nice (2021)	Never Before Seen, Never Again Found (2022)

Everything Nice is the second EP from Canadian emo band Arm's Length. The EP was digitally released on Bandcamp on 25 February 2021. After the band signed to Wax Bodega, the EP was reissued as one side A of a 12" vinyl, with side B containing their previous release, What's Mine Is Yours.

== Critical reception ==
Professional ratings
Review scores
Source	Rating
Pitchfork	7.5/10
New Noise Magazine	(positive)
Brooklyn Vegan	(positive)
Stereogum	(positive)
Spinning Thoughts	(positive)

The EP was received well by critics, with Pitchfork's Ian Cohen praising the band's "modern updates" to early 2000s pop-punk and emo, to which they add "a couple of tricky breakdowns sourced from the New Wave of Post-Hardcore and lyrics that deal primarily in identity, familial strife, and therapeutic frameworks". Chris Deville of Stereogum noted that while the songs are short, they still achieve "anthem status", while a review in New Noise Magazine highlighted the growth from the band's previous release, stating that Everything Nice "provides more sonic depth and quality, as well as a refreshing songwriting approach to the emo-rock genre".

== Track listing ==
All tracks are written by Arm's Length.

No.	Title	Length
1.	"Theme Song"	1:37
2.	"No Sleep"	3:30
3.	"Gallows Humour"	3:26
4.	"Safer Skin"	2:23
5.	"Eve (Household Name)"	3:04
6.	"Garamond"	2:59
Total length:		16:59
