= The Brightest Days =

Mixtape by Origami Angel
- Released: June 16, 2023
- Genre: Emo
- Length: 22:09
- Label: Counter Intuitive

Origami Angel chronology
Gami Gang (2021)	The Brightest Days (2023)	Feeling Not Found (2024)

Singles from The Brightest Days
- 1. "Thank You, New Jersey" Released: April 10, 2023; 2. "My PG County Summer" Released: May 17, 2023

The Brightest Days is a mixtape by American emo duo Origami Angel, released on June 16, 2023. According to the band, the reason it is called a mixtape is because "the differences between each track on The Brightest Days are what makes it such a special release."

== Reception ==
Professional ratings
Review scores
Source	Rating
Exclaim!	8/10
CaliberTV	8.5/10
Paste	7.2/10

Writing for Paste, Grant Sharples enjoyed the record, calling it "an eight-song mixtape that barrels forward at a faster pace than a chaotic 200cc race in Mario Kart 8", he also stated that the record was a good way to get into the Emo genre, featuring many of the core characteristics of the genre. The Alternative also gave a positive review of the tape, stating how it felt like the band was realizing their sound and coming into their own, stating that the album is about a conscious effort to construct your own reality. Summarize there thoughts as "using a barrage of riffs and brutal drumming to exorcise all of the evil oozing out of D.C." Writing for CaliberTV, Matthew Abraham also enjoyed the album, describing the whole album as having a more warm and summer-esque than other releases, overall calling it a standout in the band's discography as a whole.

== Track listing ==
The Brightest Days track listing
No.	Title	Length
1.	"The Brightest Days"	2:26
2.	"Thank You, New Jersey"	2:39
3.	"Picture Frame"	2:36
4.	"Kobayashi Maru (My Very Own)"	2:29
5.	"Second Best Friend"	3:47
6.	"Looking Out"	1:21
7.	"My PG County Summer"	2:28
8.	"Few and Far Between"	4:22
Total length:		22:09
