= The Fall of Hobo Johnson =

Studio album by Hobo Johnson
- Released: September 13, 2019
- Genre: Rap, spoken word
- Label: Warner

Hobo Johnson chronology
The Rise of Hobo Johnson (2016)	The Fall of Hobo Johnson (2019)	The Revenge of Hobo Johnson (2021)

Singles from The Fall of Hobo Johnson
- 1. "Typical Story"; 2. "Uglykid"; 3. "Subaru Crosstrek XV"

The Fall of Hobo Johnson is the third album by American musician Hobo Johnson, released on September 13, 2019.

It is his first major-label album. It was preceded by the singles "Typical Story" and "Uglykid".

== Content ==
The Fall of Hobo Johnson is a departure stylistically from Johnson's previous album, incorporating more musical elements instead of the first album's predominantly spoken word focus. The album explores a wide range of genres and influences, with ABC's Debbie Carr saying that "From hard rock and punk to rap, jazz and neo-soul, there’s a multitude of influences trickling into all twelve tracks." Thematically, the album covers the theme of "raw, unadulterated emotions: anger, sadness, lust, self-hatred, [and] longing", among others.

Album opener and lead single "Typical Story" is a rap rock song with lyrics telling a "wildly improbable tale", and what NPR's Robin Hilton described as a "ridiculously catchy group chorus". "Uglykid" is a "jazzy slow jam", and features electropop artist and singer-songwriter Elohim.

The song "You & the Cockroach" is in a slam poetry style, and contains lyrics humorously covering the topics of religion, government, and then-president Donald Trump's interactions with North Korea.

"Subaru Crosstrek XV" is a "playful story-song" with lyrics praising Johnson's Subaru Crosstrek. The Atlantic's Spencer Kornhaber said the song was a "rejoinder to hip-hop boasting", comparing it to the satirical hits made by the rapper Macklemore.

The song "Ode to Justin Bieber" contains lyrics relating to singer Justin Bieber's struggles with fame at a young age. "February 15th" is a short breakup song recorded live. "Sorry, My Dear" contains lyrics referencing suicide, and uses "robotic vocal manipulation" alongside explosive passages of drums and guitars, in what Kornhaber calls "an inversion of the suffering-worship behind '90s and 2000s nu metal".

The album closer "I Want a Dog" is about Johnson's tendency of setting unrealistically high expectations of what he wants in life, and not being able to be satisfied with what he has.

== Release and singles ==
"Typical Story", released as a single in the leadup to the album's release, reached the No. 30 spot on Billboard's US Hot Rock Songs chart and No. 25 on the US Alternative Songs chart.

The album itself debuted at No. 99 on the US Billboard 200, and No. 98 in the United Kingdom.

== Reception ==
=== Critical reception ===
Professional ratings
Review scores
Source	Rating
AllMusic	2.5/5 stars
NME	4/5 stars
Pitchfork	3.6/10

In a positive review, NME's Will Lavin praised the album's relatability and humor and Johnson's "addictive persona", comparing the sonic textures and personality of the record to Macklemore and Chance the Rapper, while criticizing moments he felt were too left-field and poorly arranged on "Ode to Justin Bieber" and "Sorry, My Dear".

In a mixed review, AllMusic's Timothy Monger said that despite there being an "odd sweetness to [Johnson's] rants", the album is "a kitchen sink of unfocused ideas" which "nervously pings in too many directions to really make an impact.

=== Accolades ===
Publication	List	Rank	Ref.
The Needle Drop	Top 50 Albums of 2019	30	

== Track listing ==
No.	Title	Writer(s)	Length
1.	"Typical Story"	Hobo Johnson, Jason Evigan	3:11
2.	"Mover Awayer"	Johnson, Evigan, Patrick Wimberly	3:36
3.	"Uglykid" (feat. Elohim)	Johnson, Evigan, David Baez-Lopez, Derek Lynch	3:01
4.	"You & the Cockroach"	Johnson	4:02
5.	"Subaru Crosstrek XV"	Johnson, Ryan Lewis, Phillip Peterson, Josh Rawlings	2:35
6.	"Moonlight"	Johnson, Christian James Gates‐Bahlhom, Jordan Moore	2:48
7.	"Happiness"	Johnson	3:16
8.	"All in My Head"	Johnson, Evigan	3:16
9.	"Ode to Justin Bieber" (feat. Jack Shoot & JMSEY)	Johnson, Lynch, James Nguyen	3:45
10.	"February 15th"	Johnson	1:49
11.	"Sorry, My Dear"	Johnson, Baez-Lopez, Lynch, Lerch	3:46
12.	"I Want a Dog"	Johnson	2:30
