= I Love Your Lifestyle =

Swedish emo band

- Origin: Jönköping, Sweden
- Genres: Emo, indie rock
- Years active: 2012–present
- Labels: Dog Knight Productions; Counter Intuitive Records
- Members: Lukas Feurst; Joel Bjurbo; Jonathan Bjurbo; Oscar Brask; Fredrik Dahlqvist

I Love Your Lifestyle is a Swedish emo band from Jönköping, currently based in Gothenburg and Malmö. The band was formed in 2012, and has released four full-length albums. Their second album The Movie received a positive review from Pitchfork, who described their music as "a combustible flashpoint where emo’s unhinged rhythms meets indie-pop song forms".

Their third album, No Driver, was released by Counter Intuitive Records and Dog Knight Productions on 23 October 2020.

== Discography ==
=== Studio albums ===
- We Go Way Back (2016)
- The Movie (2019)
- No Driver (2020)
- Summerland (Torpa or Nothing) (2024)

=== EPs ===
- I Love Your Lifestyle (2013)
- I Was a Loser in School (2015)

=== Singles ===
- My Yard (2015)
- Jazz Nights (2015)
- Touch / Fire (2017)
- 23 (2019)
- Dreamy Dreams (2019)
- Shilly-Shally (2020)
- Car (2020)
- Plot Twist (2024)
- Givet (2024)
