= There's a Whole World Out There =

Studio album by Arm's Length
- Released: May 16, 2025
- Recorded: September 2024
- Studio: EMAC (London, Ontario)
- Length: 46:25
- Label: Pure Noise
- Producer: Anton DeLost

Arm's Length chronology
Never Before Seen, Never Again Found (2022)	There's a Whole World Out There (2025)

Singles from There's a Whole World Out There
- 1. "Funny Face" Released: February 13, 2025; 2. "You Ominously End" Released: March 18, 2025; 3. "The Weight" Released: April 25, 2025

There's a Whole World Out There is the second studio album by Canadian emo band Arm's Length. It was released on May 16, 2025, by Pure Noise Records in vinyl, CD and digital formats. It was preceded by the singles, "Funny Face", "You Ominously End" and "The Weight", and it received favorable reception from multiple publications.

== Background ==
Released three years after the band's second album, There's a Whole World Out There was noted as encompassing themes of mental health. It features a total runtime of approximately forty-six minutes comprising twelve songs, all except the closing track range between two and four minutes.

The album's lead single, "Funny Face", was released on February 13, 2025. The band's lead vocalist Allen Steinberg described the song as "straightforward, desperate sounding" and one of the band's "darkest, heaviest tracks". "You Ominously End" was released as the second single on March 18, 2025, and "The Weight" followed as the third single on April 25, 2025.

== Reception ==
Professional ratings
Review scores
Source	Rating
Distorted Sound	9/10 stars
Dork	4/5 stars
New Noise	5/5 stars
Spectrum Culture	85%
Sputnikmusic	3.7/5

Dork rated There's a Whole World Out There four out of five, describing it as "a blistering, brilliant and bold follow-up, which builds on the group's debut full-length in every way," while Distorted Sound gave the album a rating of nine out of ten and remarked, "This time around, Arm's Length are much more contemplative, finding the kind of profound reflections on insecurities, trauma, and identity that come with distance and retrospect," comparing it with Never Before Seen, Never Again Found.

Spectrum Culture described the album as balancing "innovation with fundamentals, creating an album that hits hard while bringing a few surprises," giving it a percentage score of 85 and referring to it as "fantastic". New Noise stated it "warrants zero criticism", because its "authenticity makes it contagiously good," giving it a five-star rating, and Sputnikmusic commented that "remains a fresh and enticing listening experience throughout its entirety, and retains its thematic and experiential flow all the way to its closing acoustic meanderings."

BrooklynVegan compared the album with its predecessor, commenting "The wisdom, life experience, and musical experience that only comes with time and effort is all over There's a Whole World Out There, which improves upon Never Before Seen, Never Again Found in just about every way."

== Track listing ==
All lyrics are written by Allen Steinberg; all music is composed by Steinberg, Jeff Whyte, and Jeremy Whyte; "The World" and "Morning Person" composed with Patrick Lewis.

There's a Whole World Out There track listing
No.	Title	Length
1.	"The World"	3:42
2.	"Fatal Flaw"	4:10
3.	"Funny Face"	2:47
4.	"The Weight"	3:46
5.	"Palinopsia"	4:10
6.	"The Wound"	3:22
7.	"You Ominously End"	3:33
8.	"Early Onset"	3:56
9.	"Genetic Lottery"	3:36
10.	"Attic"	3:31
11.	"Halley"	3:05
12.	"Morning Person"	6:47
Total length:		46:25

== Personnel ==
Credits adapted from the album's liner notes.

=== Arm's Length ===
- Allen Steinberg – vocals, guitars, banjo
- Jeremy Whyte – bass
- Jeff Whyte – drums
- Ben Greenblatt – vocals

=== Additional contributors ===
- Anton DeLost – production, engineering, mixing, banjo
- Ted Jensen – mastering
- Ryan Fitzpatrick – additional production
- Kirk Jones – co-engineering
- Bonnie Brooksbank – strings
- Alex Scalzo-Brown – piano on "Attic"
- Morongod – album art
- Nicolas Spearman – layout

== Charts ==
Chart performance for There's a Whole World Out There
Chart (2025)	Peak position
US Top Album Sales (Billboard)	25
