= Strange Ranger =

American indie rock band

- Also known as: Sioux Falls (2009–2016)
- Origin: Portland, Oregon, U.S.
- Genres: Indie rock; dream pop
- Years active: 2009–2023
- Labels: Broken World; Tiny Engines; Fire Talk
- Past members: Isaac Eiger; Fred Nixon; Benjamin Scott; Fiona Woodman; Nathan Tucker; Asher Groh

Strange Ranger was an American indie rock band formed in Bozeman, Montana in 2009. Originally named Sioux Falls, they changed the moniker in 2016. The group announced their disbandment on October 30, 2023, via an Instagram post.

== History ==
The group began as the high school project of guitarist and vocalist Isaac Eiger and bassist Fred Nixon in their hometown of Bozeman, Montana. Eiger and Nixon bonded over their love of bands like Modest Mouse and Pixies, which influenced their sound. In 2010, Eiger and Nixon relocated to Portland and started putting out music on Bandcamp in the early 2010s under the name Sioux Falls.

On May 7, 2012, Sioux Falls released their first EP on Bandcamp, Odds 'n' Ends. In 2013, the group released their second EP, Big Krackel. In 2014, the band recruited drummer Benjamin Scott. On May 14, 2014, Sioux Falls released their third EP, Lights Off For Danger. On February 10, 2015, Sioux Falls released Fadeaway, a split EP with indie band Snow Roller via Broken World Media.

On February 19, 2016, Sioux Falls released their debut full-length album, Rot Forever, via Broken World Media. Later in 2016, the band saw the exit of drummer Benjamin Scott, and changed their name to Strange Ranger. On October 6, 2017, Strange Ranger released their first album under their new name, Daymoon. In 2017, the group added vocalist Fiona Woodman and drummer Nathan Tucker to their lineup. In 2019, Strange Ranger released their third full-length album as a band (second as Strange Ranger), titled Remembering the Rockets.

In 2020, Strange Ranger organized two benefit compilations, one in support of Bernie Sanders's 2020 presidential campaign, and one to benefit Groundswell's Rapid Response Funds in light of the COVID-19 pandemic.

The band's fourth album, Pure Music, was released July 21, 2023 via Fire Talk Records. The album signified a shift from indie rock into more poppy electronic sounds. In their disbandment announcement on Instagram, the band stated that Pure Music will be the last Strange Ranger album.

== Discography ==
Studio albums

as Sioux Falls

- Rot Forever (2016, Broken World Media)

as Strange Ranger

- Daymoon (2017, Tiny Engines)
- Remembering the Rockets (2019, Tiny Engines)
- Pure Music (2023, Fire Talk)

EPs

as Sioux Falls

- Odds 'n' Ends (2012, self-released)
- Big Krackel (2013, self-released)
- Lights off for Danger (2014, self-released)
- Fadeaway with Snow Roller (2015, Broken World Media)

as Strange Ranger

- Sunbeams Through Your Head (2016, self-released)
- How It All Went By (2018, Tiny Engines)

Mixtapes

as Strange Ranger

- No Light in Heaven (2021, Fire Talk)
