= Retirement Party =

American emo band

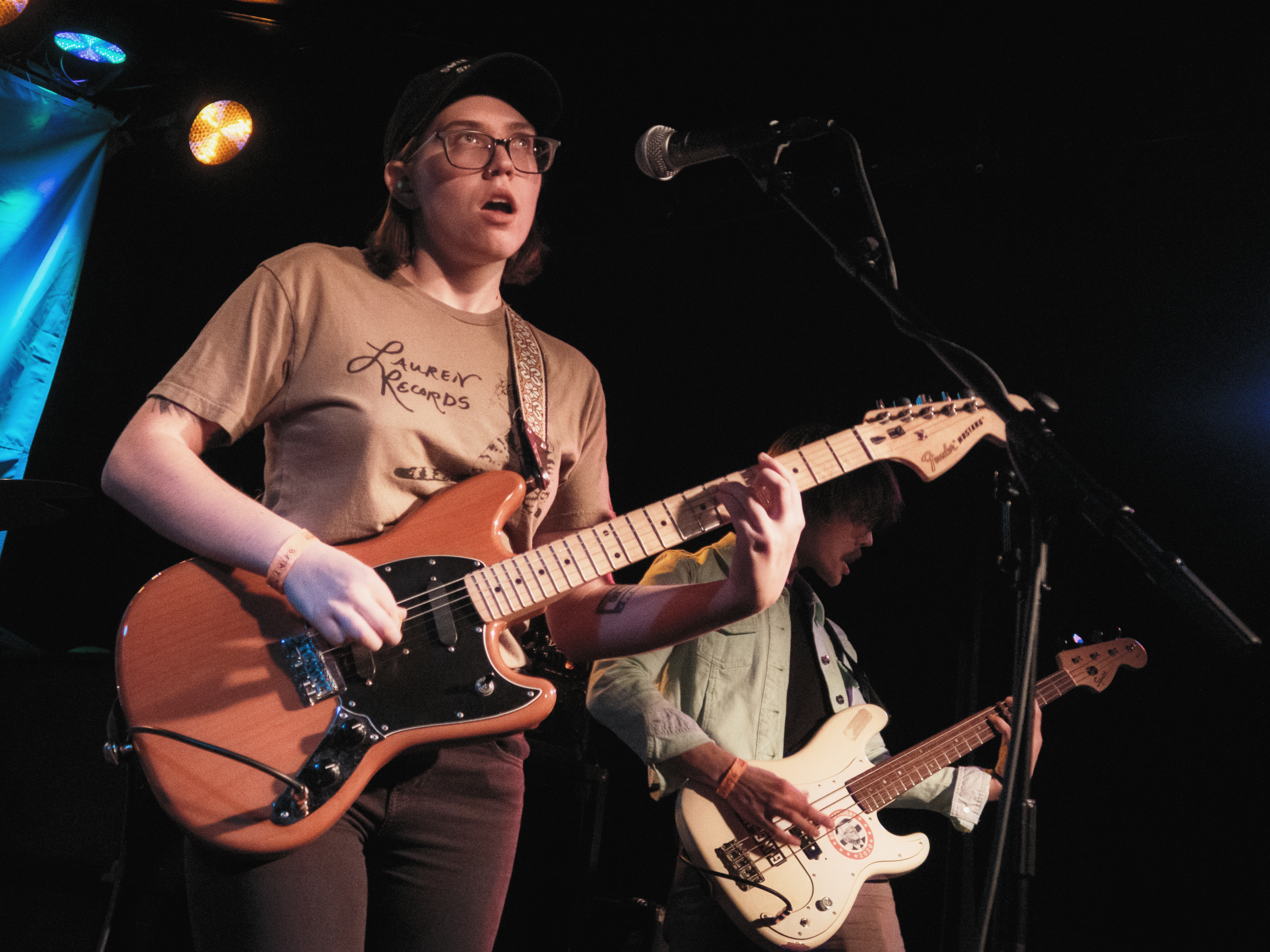
- Retirement Party at Beat Kitchen in Chicago, January 2020

Background information
- Origin: Chicago, Illinois
- Genre: Emo
- Years active: 2016–2022, 2023–present
- Label: Counter Intuitive Records
- Members: Avery Springer; James Ringness; Nick Cartwright
- Past members: Eddy Rodríguez; Kevin Mandell
- Website: retirementparty.bandcamp.com

Retirement Party is an American emo group from Chicago, Illinois.

== History ==
The group originally began in Troy, Michigan under the name Sunglasses on a Plane. Under that name, the group was just a duo fronted by Avery Springer, whose sole release was an EP titled Excess Company. After changing their name to Retirement Party, the band – now consisting of Springer, guitarist Nick Cartwright, bassist Kevin Mandell, and drummer James Ringness – self-released their first EP, titled Strictly Speaking.

In early 2018, the band signed to Boston-based label Counter Intuitive Records. Soon after signing to the label, the band released their debut full-length album, Somewhat Literate. The song "Passion Fruit Tea" was named in "Songs We Love" by NPR Music.

The band was featured on Paste Magazine's list "The 15 Chicago Bands You Need To Know in 2018" as well as Stereogum's "40 Best New Bands Of 2018".

In 2020, the band released their second full-length album titled Runaway Dog.

In 2022, the band announced their split via social media, with the band citing a change in their personal lives as the reason to discontinue the group. In the same post, they announced three final songs to release soon, a short farewell tour, and the cancellation of their European tour. The final Retirement Party show was held on April 14 at the Ukie Club in Philadelphia, Pennsylvania. The self-titled EP, Retirement Party, released on June 15, 2022.

On March 23, 2023, the band announced, via social media, that they were 'coming out of retirement' and supporting Pet Symmetry as part of their 10 year celebration tour.

== Discography ==
Studio albums

- Somewhat Literate (2018, Counter Intuitive Records)
- Runaway Dog (2020, Counter Intuitive Records)

EPs

- Strictly Speaking (2017, self-released)
- Retirement Party (2022, Counter Intuitive Records)
- Nothing To Hear Without A Sound (2025, self-released)
