= Kobayashi Station =

Kobayashi Station may refer to:

- Kobayashi Station (Chiba) on the Narita Line in Inzai, Chiba, Japan
- Kobayashi Station (Miyazaki) on the Kitto Line in Kobayashi, Miyazaki, Japan
