= Kicksie =

Canadian Indie Rock Musician

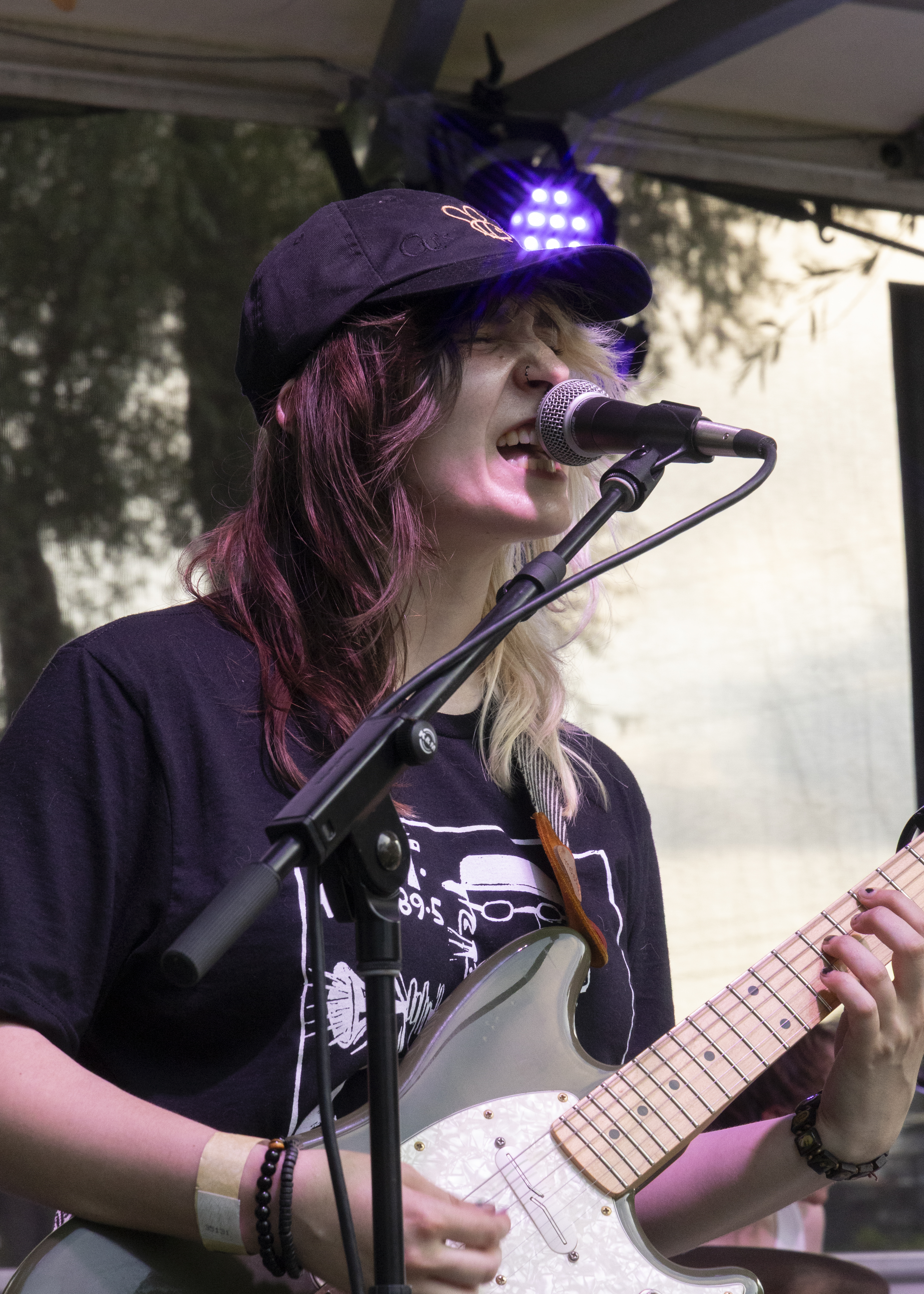
- Kicksie Performing at Buddies' Fest in July of 2025

Background information
- Origin: Toronto, Ontario, Canada
- Genres: Alternative rock; Indie Rock; Alternative R&B; Emo; Pop rock
- Years active: 2017–present
- Labels: Bedhead Records; Counter Intuitive Records
- Members: Giuliana Mormile; Alex Kessler; Morgan Dunbar

Kicksie is a Canadian Indie Rock musician, singer-songwriter, and producer based in Toronto, Ontario. The project began in 2017 with Giuliana Mormile writing, recording, and producing her own music. She released four full-length albums independently before signing with Counter Intuitive Records in 2023 for her album Slouch. After parting ways with the label, Kicksie returned to independent releases for her sixth studio album, BIG SUCKER, on June 6, 2025.

Kicksie has toured extensively in North America as a headlining act, as well as with bands such as Wheatus and Oso Oso.

== Discography ==
=== Studio Albums ===
- Doghouse (2018)
- This Summer (2018)
- Mad Dash (2019)
- All My Friends (2020)
- Slouch (2023)
- BIG SUCKER (2025)

=== Extended Plays ===
- The Bare Minimum (2018)

=== Singles ===
List of singles, showing year released and album
| Title | Year | Album |
|---|---|---|
| "Confidence" | 2018 | Non-album Singles |
| "Talk Again" | 2018 | Non-album Singles |
| "Headfirst" | 2019 | Non-album Single |
| "Too Well" | 2021 | Non-album Single |
| "You're On" | 2023 | Slouch |
| "Sinking In" | 2023 | Slouch |
| "PRETTYGIRL" | 2025 | "Non-album single" |
| "MY CAR" | 2025 | BIG SUCKER |
| "NICOLE" | 2025 | BIG SUCKER |
