= Somewhere City =

Studio album by Origami Angel
- Released: November 15, 2019
- Genre: Emo; math rock; indie rock; pop punk; easycore; indie
- Length: 30:02
- Label: Chatterbot Records

Origami Angel chronology
Somewhere City (2019)	Gami Gang (2021)

Singles from Somewhere City
- 1. "24 Hr Drive-Thru" Released: 2019; 2. "Doctor Whomst" Released: 2019

Somewhere City is the debut studio album by American emo band Origami Angel. It was released by Chatterbot Records on November 15, 2019. The lyrics describe a town called "Somewhere City" the lead singer, Ryland Heagy likes to go when he feels sad. Vinyl pressings of the album also feature a map of the fictional Somewhere City.

== Critical reception ==
Professional ratings
Review scores
Source	Rating
Pitchfork	7.0/10

Writing for Pitchfork, Ian Cohen liked the album stating how everything they had released before this had felt meaningless and unserious with this album giving them a newfound purpose. He stated that Somewhere City is an invigorating album to listen to for half an hour. Leor Galil for Chicago Reader complimented the album's energy, saying "Heagy and Doherty use their instrumental skills to work flamboyant, sometimes playful parts into neat, hook-filled songs, lending emotional resonance to what might otherwise seem like merely athletic displays."

== Track listing ==
Somewhere City track listing
No.	Title	Length
1.	"Welcome To..."	3:05
2.	"24 Hr Drive-Thru"	2:44
3.	"666 Flags"	2:47
4.	"Doctor Whomst"	2:59
5.	"Say Less"	2:25
6.	"Escape Rope"	2:16
7.	"The Title Track"	2:31
8.	"Skeleton Key"	3:02
9.	"Find Your Throne"	3:26
10.	"The Air Up Here"	4:44
Total length:		30:02

== Personnel ==
- Ryland Heagy – vocals, guitar, bass
- Pat Doherty – drums
- Jake Checkoway – engineer, mixing, mastering
