= Arm's Length =

Canadian emo band

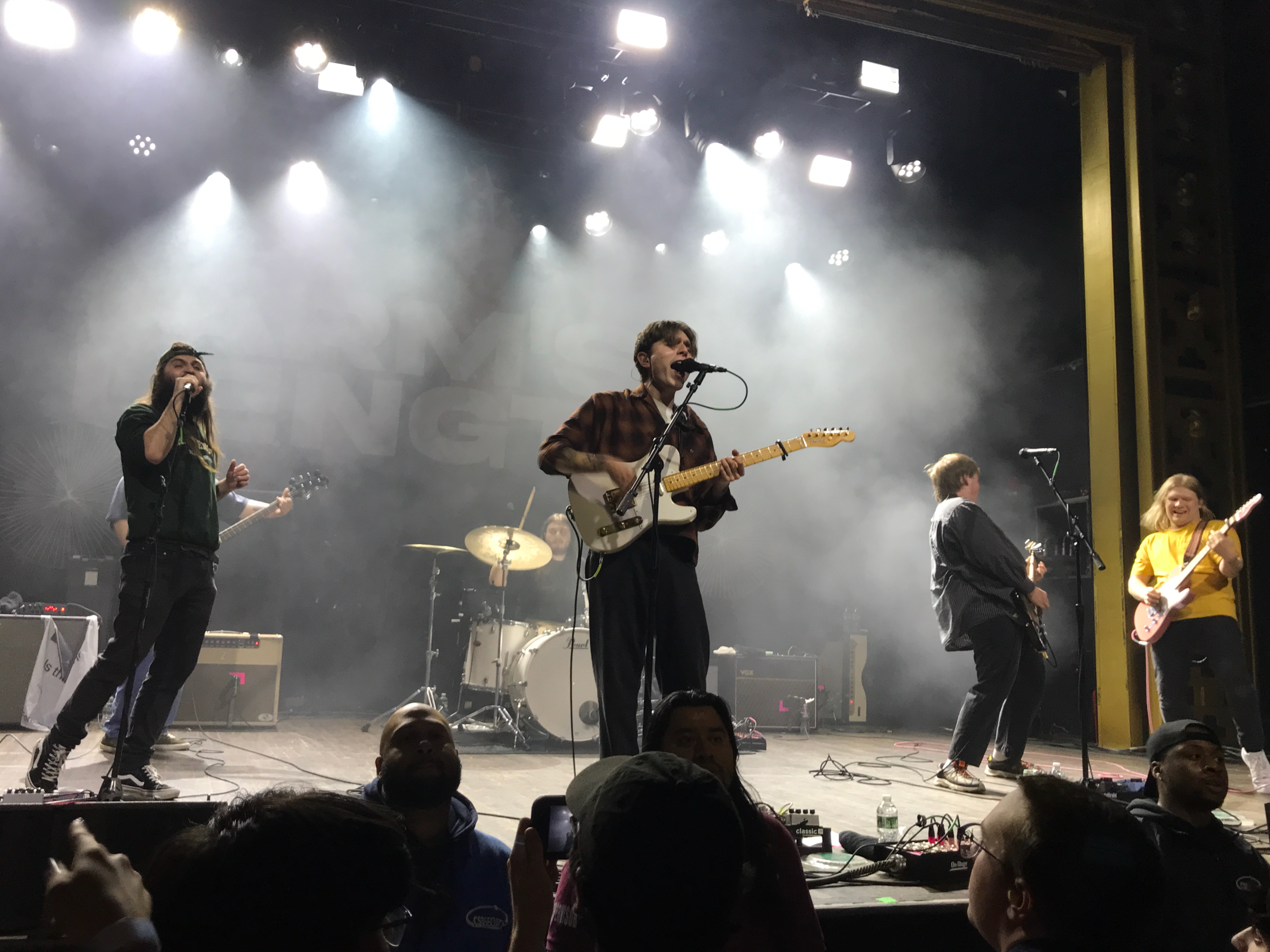
- Arm's Length at Webster Hall in November 2024 opening for Origami Angel

Background information
- Origin: Quinte West, Ontario, Canada
- Genres: Emo; post-hardcore; pop-punk
- Years active: 2019–present
- Labels: Pure Noise; Wax Bodega
- Members: Allen Steinberg; Jeremy Whyte; Jeff Whyte; Benjamin Greenblatt

Arm's Length is a Canadian emo band from Quinte West, Ontario.

== History ==
Arm's Length formed in 2018 with Allen Steinberg on guitar and vocals, and brothers Jeremy and Jeff Whyte on guitar and drums, respectively. Benjamin Greenblatt, originally from New Jersey, joined the band on bass in 2022, and former merch rep Marty Hacker-Mullen joined the group on guitar for their 2024 spring tour. Ryan Fitzpatrick (formally of Bearings) played the guitar on their 2025 album-release tour.

In February 2025, the band signed with Pure Noise Records, announcing their second studio album, There's a Whole World Out There, which was released on May 16. They then went on tour across the United States to support the album.

== Band members ==
=== Current ===
- Allen Steinberg – guitar, vocals (2018–present)
- Jeremy Whyte – guitar, bass, backing vocals (2018–present)
- Jeff Whyte – drums (2018–present)
- Benjamin Greenblatt – bass (2022–present)

=== Touring ===
- Marty Hacker-Mullen – guitar (2024)
- Ryan Fitzpatrick – guitar (2025–2026)
- Charlie Burket – guitar (2026–present)

== Discography ==
=== Studio albums ===
- Never Before Seen, Never Again Found (2022)
- There's a Whole World Out There (2025)

=== Extended plays ===
- What's Mine Is Yours (2019)
- Everything Nice (2021)

=== Singles ===
List of singles, showing year released and album
Title	Year	Album
"Watercolour"	2019	What's Mine Is Yours
"Garamond"	2021	Everything Nice
"No Sleep"	2021	Everything Nice
"Object Permanence"	2022	Never Before Seen, Never Again Found
"In Loving Memory"	2022	Never Before Seen, Never Again Found
"Up In Smoke"	2023	Wax Bodega Tour
"Arm's Length"	2023	Wax Bodega Tour
"I Don't Love You"	2024	Non-album single
"Really Big Shrimp"	2024	Wax Bodega Tour
"Funny Face"	2025	There's a Whole World Out There
"You Ominously End"	2025	There's a Whole World Out There
"The Weight"	2025	There's a Whole World Out There
