= Broken World Media =

American record label

- Founded: 2012
- Founder: Nicole Shanholtzer
- Defunct: 2017
- Genre: Various
- Country of origin: U.S.
- Location: Pittsburgh, Pennsylvania
- Official website: www.brokenworldmedia.com

Broken World Media was an American record label based in Pittsburgh, Pennsylvania, founded in 2012 by Nicole Shanholtzer (formerly of The World Is a Beautiful Place & I Am No Longer Afraid to Die) and subsequently closed in 2017. While active, Broken World Media worked with a wide variety of artists on a project-by-project basis.

== Selected artists ==
- Brightside
- Camping in Alaska
- Empire! Empire! (I Was a Lonely Estate)
- Funeralbloom
- Old Gray
- Oliver Houston
- Rozwell Kid
- Saintseneca
- Sorority Noise
- Tiny Moving Parts
- Told Slant
- Perspective, A Lovely Hand To Hold
- Sioux Falls
