= Saturdays At Your Place =

American emo band

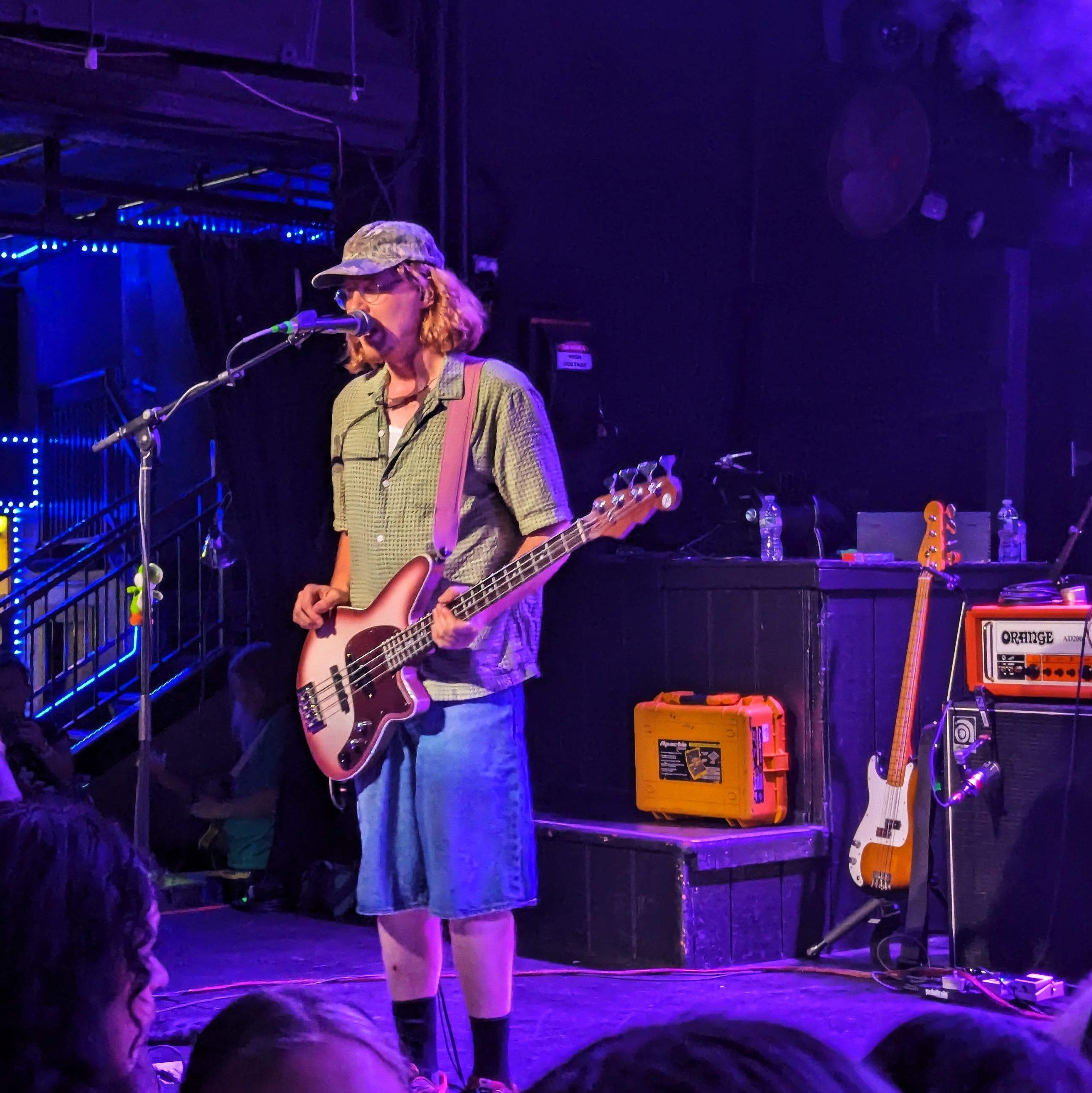
- Esden Stafne playing at Toad's Place, in 2026

Background information
- Origin: Kalamazoo, Michigan
- Genres: Midwest emo
- Years active: 2021–present
- Members: Esden Stafne; Gabe Wood; Mitch Gulish
- Website: www.saturdaysatyourplace.com

Saturdays At Your Place is an American midwest emo band formed in Kalamazoo, Michigan in 2021. The band consists of vocalist and bassist Esden Stafne, vocalist and drummer Gabe Wood, and guitarist Mitch Gulish.

The band was formed by three friends at Western Michigan University, releasing their debut album, something worth celebrating, in 2021. This was followed by the EP always cloudy in 2023. They released their second album, these things happen, in September 2025.

== Band members ==
Current

- Esden Stafne – bass, vocals (2021–present)
- Gabe Wood – drums, vocals (2021–present)
- Mitch Gulish – guitar, backing vocals (2021–present)

Former

- Paxton Earl – guitar, vocals (2021)

== Discography ==
=== Studio albums ===
- something worth celebrating (2021)
- these things happen (2025)

=== EPs ===
- always cloudy (2023)
