= Mom Jeans =

American emo band

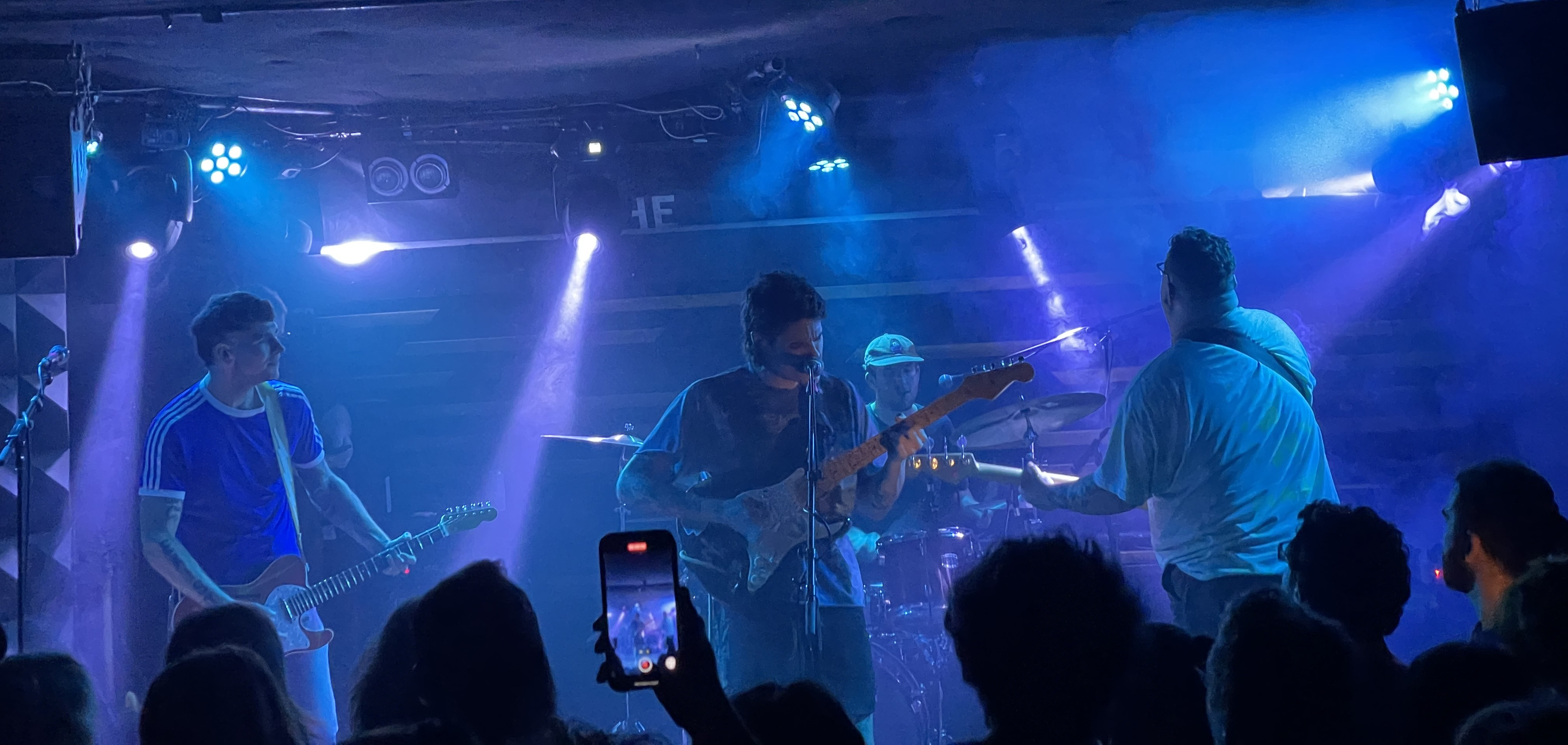
- Mom Jeans performing in 2023

Background information
- Origin: Berkeley, California, United States
- Genres: Indie rock; pop-punk; emo
- Years active: 2014–present
- Labels: Counter Intuitive; Big Scary Monsters
- Members: Eric Butler; Bart Thompson; Austin Carango; Sam Kless
- Past members: Josh Perline; Matt Falls; Gabriel Paganin
- Website: momjeansca.com

Mom Jeans (stylized Mom Jeans.) is an American alternative rock/indie rock band formed in Berkeley, California in 2014.

== History ==
Mom Jeans was founded in early 2014 at UC Berkeley, with drummer Austin Carango and lead singer Eric Butler. The duo recorded Spring Demo in May 2014, a six-track EP which would later be released as the band's self-titled debut on cassette tape by Northern California-based label, Fourth Row Records. Tracks on Spring Demo feature only Butler and Carango performing in an acoustic style, while the later release of the self-titled EP included electric instrumentation with new members Josh Perline on bass/vocals and David McDowall on drums. McDowall left the band shortly after release.

Later in 2014, the trio recorded their last EP before their first full-length album, titled Allergic which featured Carango switching to drums, Perline switching to guitar, and bass recordings being handled by both members. Post-release, Gabriel "Gabe" Paganin joined the band as live bassist and Josh Perline exited the band.

Mom Jeans self-released their first full-length album, Best Buds, on July 3, 2016. Like their self-titled EP, the album was first released on cassette tape by Fourth Row Records. Soon thereafter, the group signed with Massachusetts-based label Counter Intuitive Records, who then re-released the band's first full-length album on vinyl in November 2016.

On March 7, 2017, Mom Jeans released a split EP with the Fresno-based band Graduating Life. Afterward, Bart Thompson of Graduating Life and Meet Me in Montauk became a guitarist for the band.

On October 6, 2017, Counter Intuitive Records released another split EP titled NOW That's What I Call Music Vol. 420, featuring music from Mom Jeans as well as the bands Pictures of Vernon and Prince Daddy & the Hyena.

The same month, the band announced they had signed with SideOneDummy Records, and had plans to release their second album through the label in 2018. However, in a Reddit post, Eric Butler confirmed that they would no longer be working with the label and instead continue to work with Counter Intuitive Records to release their second album.

The band's second full-length album, Puppy Love, was released on July 3, 2018, with Counter Intuitive Records, as well as a limited independent label run of the record and a select variant being put out by UK based label Big Scary Monsters.

In early 2019, the band began recording demos for a new LP, named Sweet Tooth, following the departure of Gabriel Paganin. Later in the year it was announced the band would be direct support for Hobo Johnson in the fall of 2019. Sweet Tooth was released on February 25, 2022, with the first single "What's Up?" being released on September 28, 2021.

On November 13, 2023, the band announced an acoustic studio album, Bear Market. The album comprises primarily acoustic rerecorded songs from their previous albums. The album was released on November 17, 2023.

== Band members ==
Current members

- Eric Butler – vocals, guitar, trombone (2014–present)
- Austin Carango – drums, vocals, trumpet (2014–present)
- Bart Thompson – guitar, vocals (2017–present)
- Sam Kless – bass, percussion, vocals (2019–present)

Past members

- Josh Perline – guitar, bass (2014)
- Matt Falls – drums (2014)
- Gabriel Paganin – bass (2014-2019)

Touring members

- Billy Bouzos – bass (2019)
- Matt Yankovich - guitar (2022-2023)

== Discography ==
Studio albums

- Best Buds (2016)
- Puppy Love (2018)
- Sweet Tooth (2022)
- Mom Jeans LP 4 (2027)

Acoustic albums

- Bear Market (2023)

EPs

- Mom Jeans/Graduating Life Split EP (2017, Riff castle records, Counter Intuitive Records)
- Mom Jeans/Prince Daddy & the Hyena/Pictures of Vernon - "NOW That's What I Call Music Vol. 420" (2017, Counter Intuitive Records)

Compilation Appearances

- The Alt's Best of 2018 Comp (2019, The Alternative) - contributes "Glamorous"
