= Camping in Alaska =

American emo band

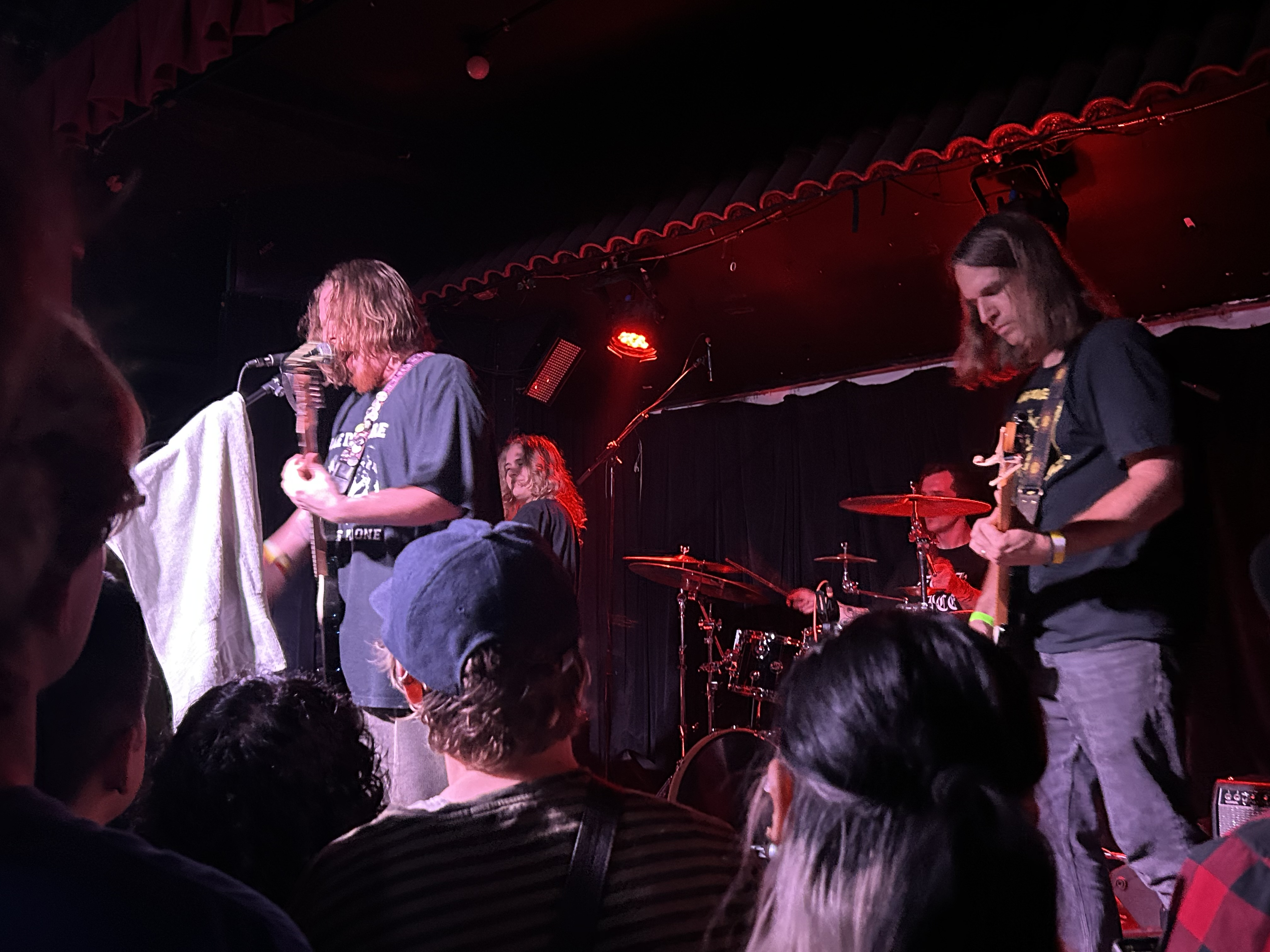
- Camping in Alaska performing at El Cid in 2026

Background information
- Origin: Huntsville, Alabama, US
- Genres: Midwest emo; emo revival
- Years active: 2012–present
- Label: Broken World Media
- Members: Austin Davis; Jacob Stewart; Jacob Hill; Dani Fandre
- Past members: Ben Cape; Eli Long; Robin; Geoffery Swanson
- Website: campinginalaska.bandcamp.com

Camping in Alaska is an American Midwest emo band from Huntsville, Alabama, founded in 2012, and credited with having had a significant influence on the emo revival genre.

== History ==
Band members Austin Davis and Jacob Stewart met when they were 11 at a taekwondo class. They initially bonded through a shared disinterest in the class and interest in punk music. The two began writing music together at the age of 15. After developing their sound in Davis's parents' garage, the band began playing DIY shows in northern Alabama with the addition of Ben Cape and Jacob Hill. In 2013, the band released their debut album, Please Be Nice (stylized with all lowercase), which became a hit with the 2010s Midwest emo scene after the song "C U in da Ballpit" (also stylized with all lowercase) gained significant traction on YouTube. The demo was originally recorded in Davis's mom's garage before the band rented out a studio space for several hours to record the album more professionally. The band has stated that despite the success of "C U in da Ballpit", they all hate it. The song was not originally meant to be on the album; it was written in two hours after the band realized they had overestimated the studio time needed to record the other songs, so they used the opportunity to write and record one more.

Cape left shortly after the release of Please Be Nice and the band put out their sophomore album – Bathe (stylized with all caps) – in 2014; the album was picked up by Broken World Media shortly thereafter and it was re-released on cassette with the label in 2015. In 2016, the band released Welcome Home Son (also stylized with all caps), which took a darker and more serious tone than previous releases; the album is primarily concerned with the themes of addiction, homelessness, and loss, as all of the band members have experiences battling addiction. The darker tone contrasts with Please Be Nice, which focuses on themes of skating, being in high school, and hanging out in parking lots.

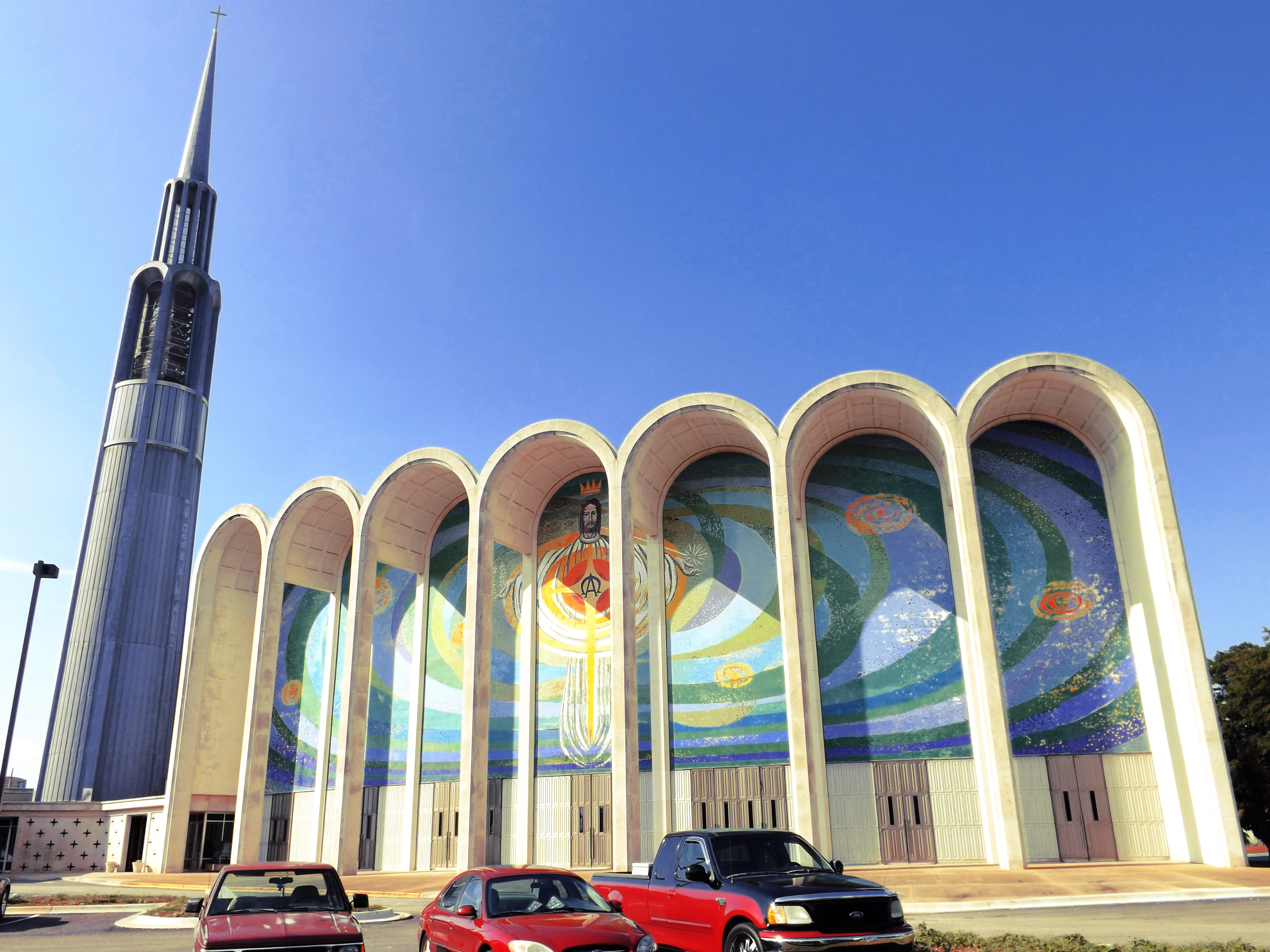
The band's 2024 album is named after the mural at First Baptist Church in Huntsville, colloquially known as "Eggbeater Jesus".

A hiatus caused by the band's drug use followed the release of Welcome Home Son, but in 2022 – with the addition of Dani Fandre, Davis's partner – the band released Lost and Found, a collection of acoustic demos recorded between 2017 and 2018. In 2023, the band released Hollow Eyes (again stylized with all caps) which was followed by a tenth-anniversary tour for Please Be Nice. The band announced their album entitled Eggbeater Jesus, named after a local landmark mural on a church in Huntsville. The name was chosen because, during his bout with homelessness, Davis had slept outside of the church in below-freezing weather.

== Influence ==
Camping in Alaska has been considered influential to Midwest emo and the emo revival movement, particularly its debut album, which has been described as a cult classic. The band has cited Sunny Day Real Estate, Modest Mouse, Fugazi, Pavement, and Jawbreaker as influences.

== Members ==
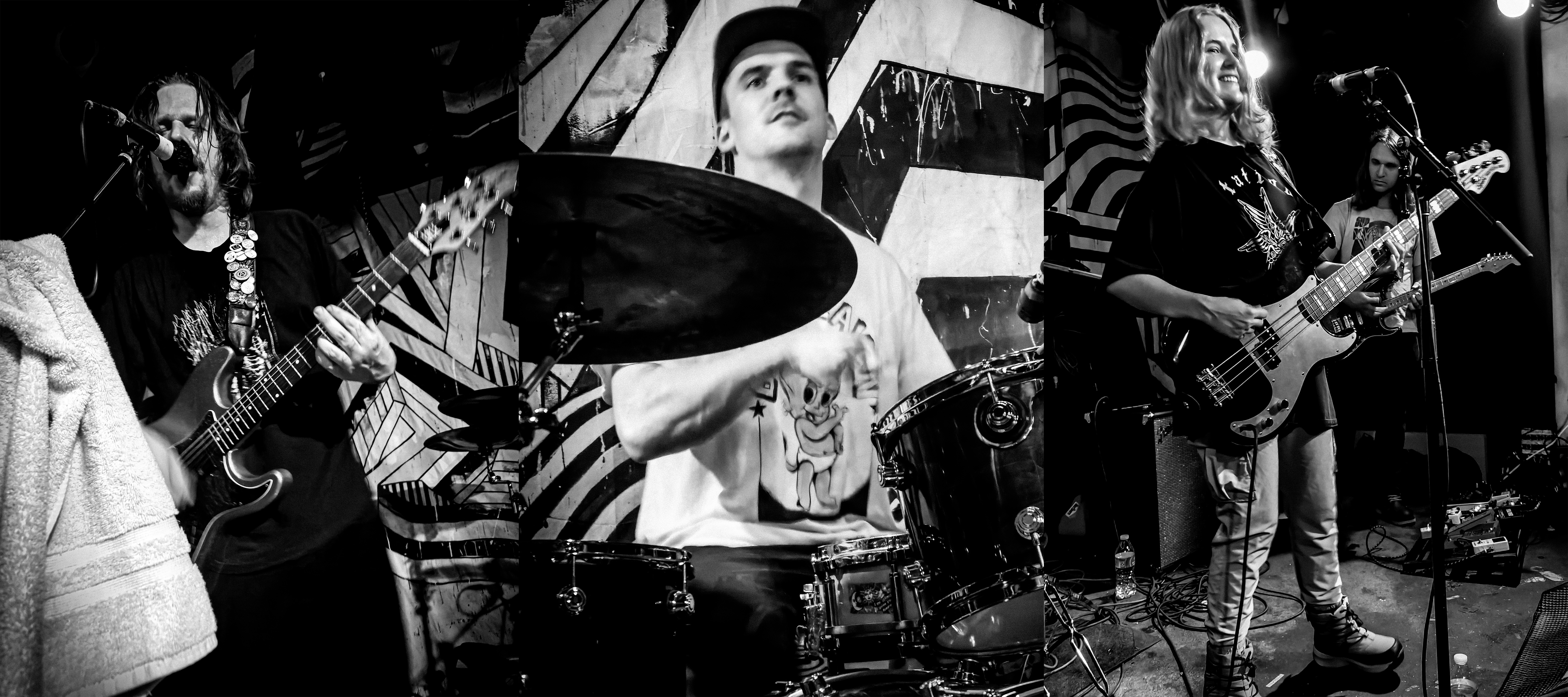
Camping in Alaska in 2025. From left: Austin Davis, Jacob Stewart, Dani Fandre (front) and touring member Steven Whaley (back)

Current members

- Austin Davis – lead vocals, rhythm guitar (2012–present)
- Jacob Stewart – drums (2012–present)
- Jacob Hill – rhythm guitar, bass (2012–present)
- Dani Fandre – bass (2022–present)

Former members

- Ben Cape – guitar, vocals (2012–2013)
- Eli Long – bass (2012–2022), lead guitar (2022–2025)
- Robin – drums (? (Note: In Cortés (2023), Davis recounts that the band's name was chosen by "our old drummer, Robin". The last name is not mentioned, nor is the time frame in which they were in the band.))
- Geoffery Swanson – trumpet (2012–2016)

== Discography ==
- please be nice (2013)
- BATHE (2014)
- WELCOME HOME SON (2016)
- Lost and Found (2022)
- HOLLOW EYES (2023)
- Eggbeater Jesus (2024)
