= Prince Daddy & the Hyena =

American punk rock band

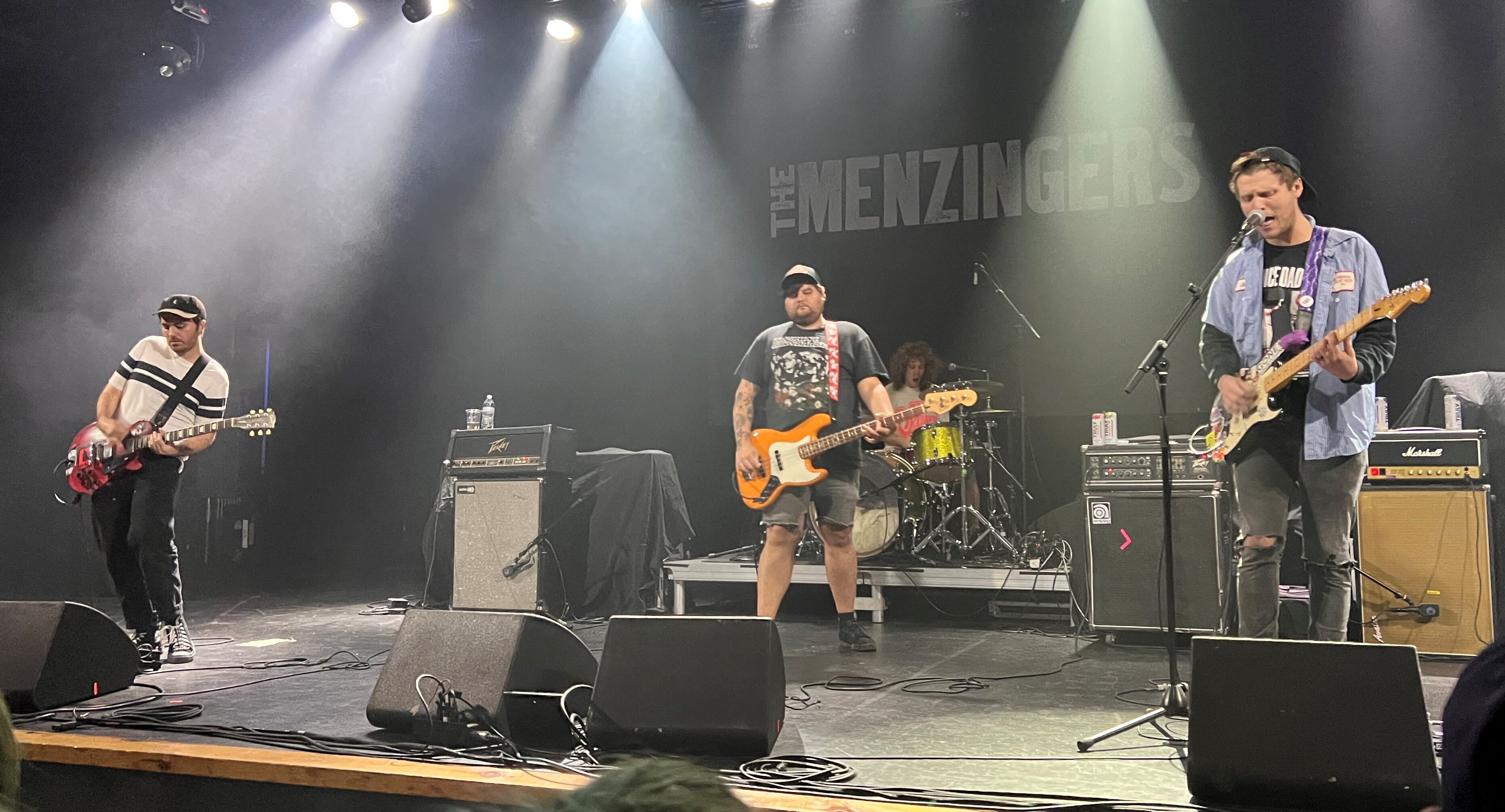
- Prince Daddy & the Hyena performing at the Mill & Mine music venue in Knoxville, Tennessee, August 18, 2023. Left to right: Handford, Chmielowski, Gorham and Gregory.

Background information
- Origin: Albany, New York, U.S.
- Genres: Punk rock; pop punk; power pop; post-hardcore; emo
- Years active: 2014–present
- Labels: Pure Noise, Counter Intuitive, Big Scary Monsters (EU)
- Members: Kory Gregory; Cameron Handford; Daniel Gorham; Jordan Chmielowski
- Past members: Adam Dasilva; Zahra Houacine; Alex Ziembiec

Prince Daddy & the Hyena is an American punk rock band from Albany, New York, formed in 2014. They have released four full-length albums and four extended plays.

== History ==
=== Formation and early years ===
Prince Daddy and the Hyena was formed in 2014 when Kory Gregory, Alex Ziembiec and Zahra Houacine were inspired to start a band after seeing Rozwell Kid live. According to Gregory, Rozwell Kid was a substantial influence on much of his early songwriting. The origin of the band's name is obscure; Gregory has stated that, when questioned about it in interviews, he "would make up a different dumbass story each time". He has variously explained that it was derived from a game that Gregory played with the band's TM & merch person – Luis Wiest – at recess in elementary school, that it was the name of Gregory's childhood guinea pig, or that it is his parents' anniversary. He has also tweeted that there is a comma missing between Prince and Daddy, due to a grammatical error.

The band met lead guitarist Cameron Handford through house shows and mutual friends eventually leading up to his joining of the band.

Prince Daddy & the Hyena began in 2014 with the release of an extended play titled Skip Cutscenes! Blow Loud!

The band released the EP Adult Summers in 2015 through Broken World Media and again in 2017 through Counter Intuitive Records.

Their first full-length album I Thought You Didn't Even Like Leaving was finally released in 2016 on Broken World Media.

In 2017, Ziembiec left the band and was replaced by Daniel Gorham, a founding member of both Wednesday and Pictures of Vernon.

=== Cosmic Thrill Seekers ===
In 2019, the band released its second full-length album titled Cosmic Thrill Seekers on Counter Intuitive Records, and embarked on several extensive tours in support of the album. This tour would prove difficult for the band, as they were involved in a traffic accident which left the band and members of their team temporarily disabled. After recovering from this incident, the band's tour van was broken into, leading to the loss of $7,500 worth of equipment.

The band toured Europe with Oso Oso in support of the album in the fall of 2019, and in 2020, the band embarked on a co-headlining tour with Oso Oso, with support from Just Friends.

=== Self-titled album and Hotwire Trip Switch ===
In 2021, the band signed to Pure Noise Records and released the single "Curly Q.", which Gregory wrote for his nephew.

In 2022, they announced their third album, Prince Daddy & the Hyena, to release on April 15. The album is conceptually about the fear of death, and was inspired by a van crash the band experienced. The album was also supported by the singles "A Random Exercise In Impermanence (The Collector)," "El Dorado," and "Shoelaces," as well as a headlining tour throughout the United States with Macseal, Insignificant Other, and California Cousins.

Original drummer Alex Ziembiec died in November 2022.

In February 2023, they embarked on a co-headlining tour with Drug Church, with support from Anxious and Webbed Wing.

On March 3, 2026, the band released the song "Big-Box Store Heart" as the lead single for their fourth album, Hotwire Trip Switch, which released on April 17, from Counter Intuitive Records.

== Musical style ==
The band has self-identified themselves as a punk rock band in an interview with The Fader. Critically, the band has been described as "smartly crafted slacker punk" with elements of power pop, post-hardcore, and emo by AllMusic. Pitchfork has identified the band as both punk rock and emo.

Frontman Kory Gregory has cited Weezer, the Strokes, Jeff Rosenstock, and Green Day as major influences on the sound. In an interview with The Fader, Gregory described the sound on the band's second album Cosmic Thrill Seekers as "the soundtrack to a Disney film played by a punk rock band."

== Band members ==
Current

- Corey "Kory" Joseph Gregory – lead vocals, guitar (2014–present)
- Cameron "Cambo" Handford – guitar (2014–present)
- Daniel "Podwick" Gorham – drums, backing vocals (2017–present)
- Jordan "J Nasty" Chmielowski – bass (2022–present)

Past

- Zahra "Z" Houacine – bass (2014–2019)
- Alex "Al Al Bean" Ziembiec – drums (2014–2017; died 2022)
- Adam Dasilva – bass (2020–2022)

Touring

- Jake Sulzer – drums (2017), bass (2023)
- Sam Kless - drums (2016-2017)
- Matt Yankovich - bass (2016)
- James Ringness – drums (2017)
- Cole Syzilagyi – bass (2022)

== Discography ==
=== Studio albums ===
- I Thought You Didn't Even Like Leaving (2016, Broken World Media/2017, Counter Intuitive Records)
- Cosmic Thrill Seekers (2019, Counter Intuitive Records)
- Prince Daddy & the Hyena (2022, Pure Noise Records)
- Hotwire Trip Switch (2026, Counter Intuitive Records)

=== EPs ===
- Skip Cutscenes! Blow Loud! (2014, Wallflower Records)
- Adult Summers (2015, Broken World Media, 2017 Counter Intuitive Records)

=== Splits ===
- Prince Daddy & The Hyena/Just Friends (2016, Broken World Media)
- Now That's What I Call Music Vol. 420 (2017, Counter Intuitive Records)

=== Singles ===
- Adult Summers Pt. 2 (2015, Broken World Media)
- *HIDDEN TRACK* (2015, Broken World Media)
- I Thought You Didn't Even Like Leaving (2016, Broken World Media)
- Hundo Pos (2016, Broken World Media)
- I Forgot To Take My Meds Today (2017, Broken World Media)
- I Lost My Life (2019, Counter Intuitive Records)
- Lauren (Track 2) (2019, Counter Intuitive Records)
- Fuckin' A (2019, Counter Intuitive Records)
- Prototype of The Ultimate Life-form (2019, Counter Intuitive Records)
- Curly Q (2021, Pure Noise Records)
- A Random Exercise in Impermanence (The Collector) (2022, Pure Noise Records)
- El Dorado (2022, Pure Noise Records)
- Shoelaces (2022, Pure Noise Records)
- God Complex / La Da Da (2024, Counter Intuitive Records)
- Mr. Transistor (2025, Counter Intuitive Records)
- Big-Box Store Heart (2026, Counter Intuitive Records)
- 24-03-04_Birthday_B4 (2026, Counter Intuitive Records)
- 30days30days30days / SHITSHOW or Boulevard of Soaking Dreams (2026, Counter Intuitive Records)
