= Macseal =

American indie rock band

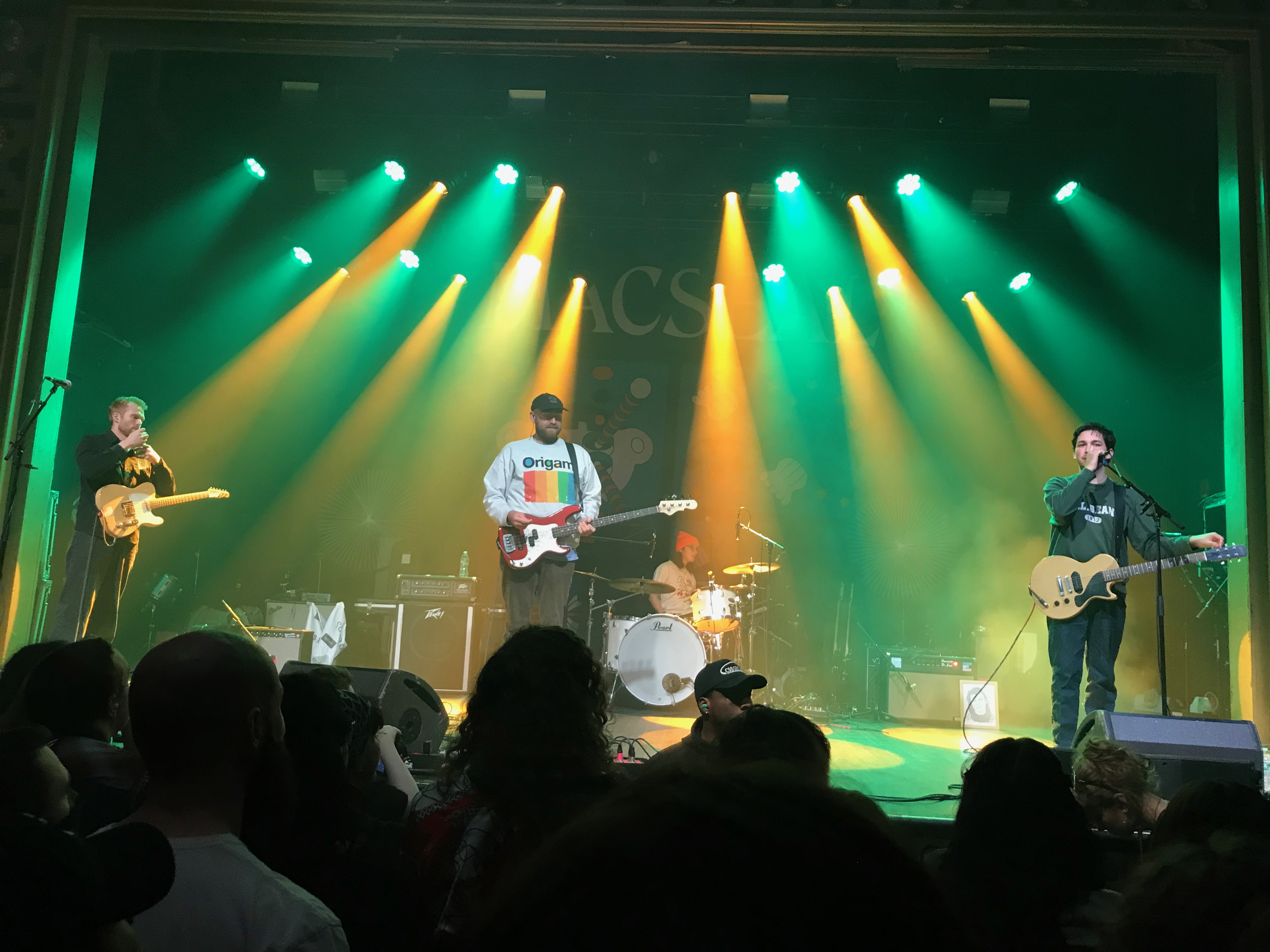
- Macseal at Webster Hall in November 2024 opening for Origami Angel

Background information
- Origin: Farmingdale, New York
- Genres: Midwest emo; math rock; pop punk
- Years active: 2014–present
- Label: Counter Intuitive Records
- Website: macsealband.bandcamp.com

Macseal is an American indie rock band from Farmingdale, New York.

== History ==
Macseal began with the release of a self-titled EP in August 2015. In May 2017, the band released another EP titled Yeah, No, I Know . In 2018, Macseal released an EP titled Map It Out. On November 11, 2019, Macseal released their debut full-length album, Super Enthusiast, on 6131 Records.

== Members ==
- Ryan Bartlett – vocals, guitar, keyboards
- Cole Szilagyi – vocals, guitar
- Justin Canavaciol – bass
- Francesca Impastato – drums

== Discography ==
Studio albums

- Super Enthusiast (2019, 6131 Records)
- Permanent Repeat (2024, Counter Intuitive Records)

Extended plays

- Macseal EP (2015)
- etc. (2016)
- Yeah, No, I Know (2017)
- Map It Out (2018)

Singles

- Every Dream (2025)
