= Oliver Houston =

American emo band from Michigan

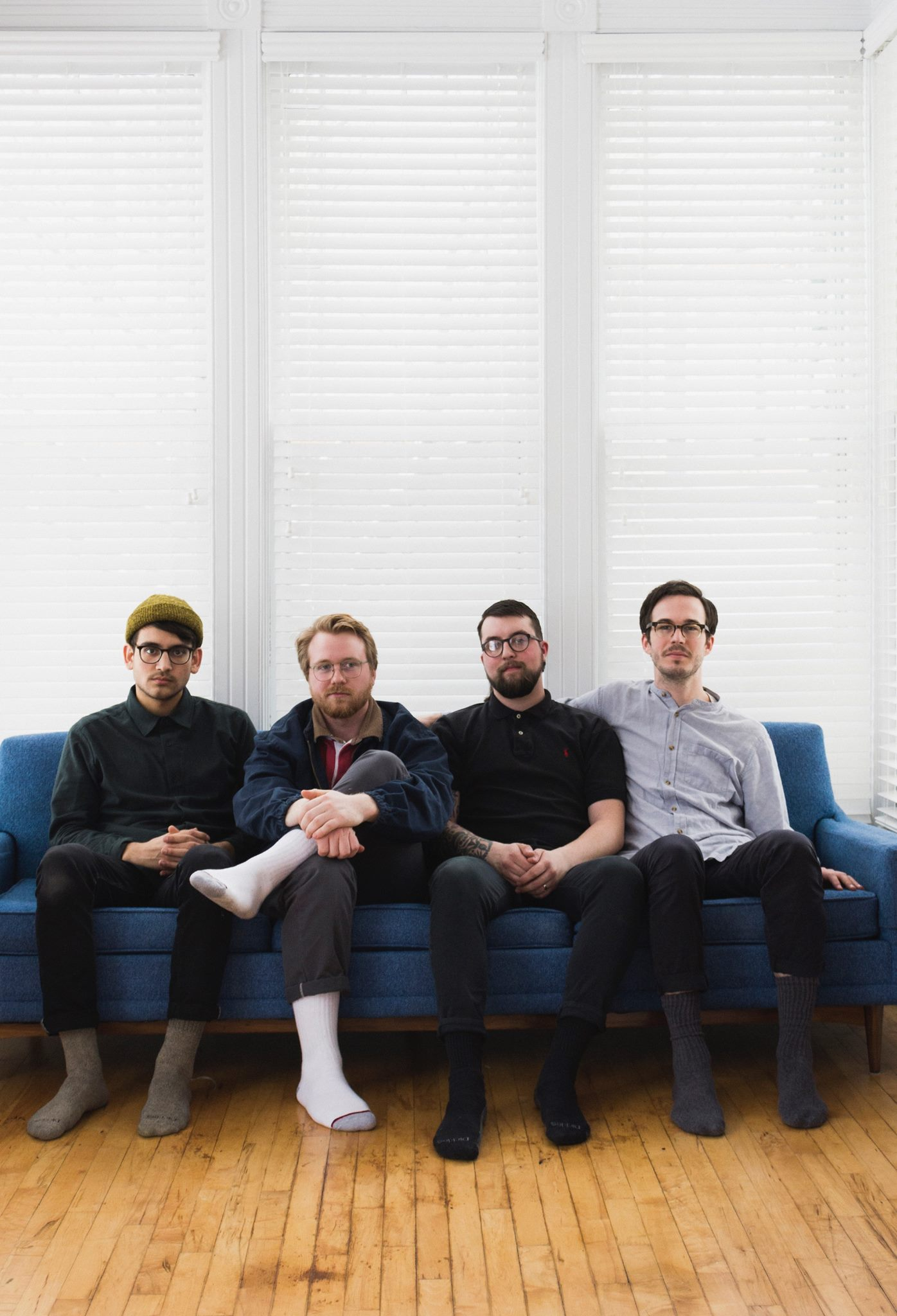

Background information
- Origin: Grand Rapids, Michigan
- Genres: Emo
- Years active: 2015–2018
- Spinoff of: The Exploration
- Members: Kyle Luck; Matthew Mancilla-McCue; Garret Cabello; James Sullivan
- Past members: Matthew Terrian; Caleb Jorgensen
- Website: oliverhouston.bandcamp.com

Oliver Houston was an American emo band from Grand Rapids, Michigan.

== History ==
Oliver Houston formed in 2011 as a side project for vocalist Kyle Luck and drummer Garret Cabello's band The Exploration. The band released their first EP, The Dork Ages, in early 2015, and released it on 7" vinyl through Broken World Media and Too Far Gone Records later the same year. The band's debut full-length album, titled Whatever Works, was self released on January 23, 2017. They released their final EP, Mixed Reviews, on November 29, 2018, along with an announcement of their breakup. Oliver Houston played their final show, an unannounced set, on Friday, September 28, 2018, at The Witch House in Grand Rapids.

== Band members ==
- Kyle Luck (vocals, guitar)
- Matthew Mancilla McCue (vocals, bass)
- Garret Cabello (drums)
- James Sullivan (guitar)

Former members

- Matthew Terrian (guitar) (2016-2017)
- Caleb Jorgenson (guitar) (2015)

== Discography ==
Studio albums

- Whatever Works (2017, Self Released)
- Mixed Reviews (2018, Self Released)

EPs

- The Dork Ages (2015, Too Far Gone Records / Broken World Media / Self Released)
