= Origami Angel =

American rock band

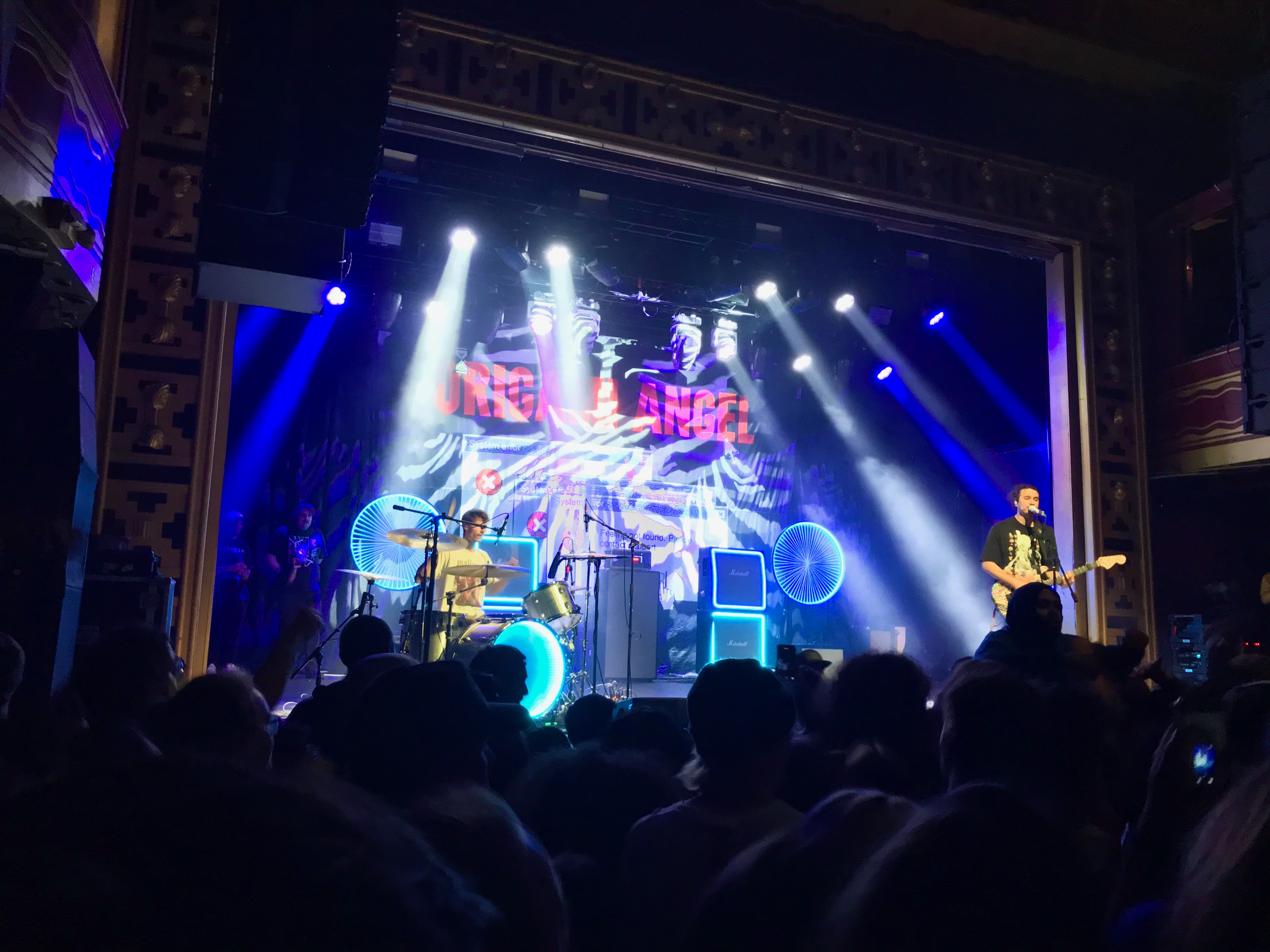
- Origami Angel performing at Webster Hall in November 2024

Background information
- Origin: Washington DC, U.S
- Genres: Emo; indie rock; pop punk
- Years active: 2016–present
- Labels: Chatterbot; Counter Intuitive
- Members: Ryland Heagy; Pat Doherty

Origami Angel is an American rock band from Washington D.C., consisting of singer and guitarist Ryland Heagy and drummer Pat Doherty. The duo formed the band in 2016 after the demise of a common prior band, and released a series of EPs leading up to their debut studio album, Somewhere City in 2019. The COVID-19 pandemic limited the ability to tour in support of the album, so they instead focused on recording material written during the prior sessions to release their second studio album, Gami Gang in 2021, and wrote and recorded further material for a series of smaller releases, including a mixtape, The Brightest Days, released in 2023. A third studio album, Feeling Not Found, was released on September 27, 2024.

== History ==
=== Formation and early EPs (2016–2018) ===
Band members Ryland Heagy and Pat Doherty first met in late 2015. Doherty had been drumming for a local band named RYK, and after attending a performance and being impressed, Heagy and a friend asked Doherty to join their band Idle Empire, which he accepted. The band had struggled to retain a consistent drummer, and were excited to have a dedicated one in Doherty, but just as Heagy had written some material to record over the course of a few months, the band broke up. Instead, Heagy chose to record the material as a duo with Doherty, and started the band "Origami Angel". Heagy handled vocals, guitars, and bass, and Doherty played drums. Early recording sessions were tough due to their busy schedules - both worked full-time to help finance the recording process, while Doherty attended school. In addition to this, the duo agreed early on to emphasize a "DIY ethic" where they do as much of the work on the albums as possible. Both pooled all of the income into the band, while Heagy wrote material whenever time was found between work and other life obligations.

Their first EP, Quiet Hours, was released in April 2017. The band toured locally in support of the EP for a short period, but eventually paused to focus on school. They returned to recording, and the following year, released a second EP, titled Doing The Most. While Quiet Hours had a softer, more stripped-down sound, Doing the Most saw the band discover their guitar-heavy pop punk sound found in subsequent releases.

=== Somewhere City and Gami Gang (2019–2021) ===
After the completion of their first 2 EPs, the band continued to record music for a series of releases throughout 2019. The duo wrote a large volume of material, but limited finances caused them to break up the releases into three main parts - two small ones that would be used to build momentum into releasing their first studio album. First, in early 2019, was a split EP with the band Commander Salamander titled Holy Split, consisting of two new songs from the band. Second, on May 30, 2019, the band released their third EP, Gen 3. The EP's title is an allusion to the third generation of games in the Pokémon series of video games. The song's lyrical content is not necessarily about Pokémon - the song "Ruby" was even originally called "Sophie" and intended for the Holy Split EP. However, there are allusions to the series, and all of the songs' titles are references to Pokémon games - "Ruby" for Pokémon Ruby, "Sapphire" for Pokémon Sapphire, "Emerald" for Pokémon Emerald, and "XD Gale of Darkness" for Pokémon XD: Gale of Darkness. The two chose the subject matter as a "love letter" to the series, with it being important to both of their childhoods, and something they bonded over as band members.

The band next turned to completing their debut album. Heagy continued to write material any time he had free time from his 50-hour a week job, and would present it to Doherty when he would return from being away from college. After a few months, Heagy realized that he had accumulated over 35 rough song ideas; knowing they could only finance a single album for their debut, the duo split the material into two main groups. They separated 15 of the strongest songs of a similar thematic and conceptual nature to create their debut album, and the remaining 20 were left for a potential future album of more varying musical stylings. The material kept for the debut album were themed around the concept of their ideal utopia, countering the typically negative lyrical content found in emo music with more positive content, and allusions to the pop culture of their childhood and past. The resulting album, Somewhere City was released on November 15, 2019.

The album was well received by music publications, with the band beginning to get recognition beyond their local scene. Pitchfork described Somewhere City as "[embodying] the sound of emo in 2019", and the Chicago Reader asserted it "set the tone for emo's next decade" and was "one of the best emo albums of 2019". The band toured for approximately three months in support of the release, with Heagy noting that the band began playing bigger venues with higher enthusiasm after its release. While the COVID-19 pandemic halted touring, the band continued to livestream performances. In place of a canceled live show at Bowling Green's Summit Shack, the band livestreamed a concert through the video game Minecraft. Attendance was so high that it crashed the servers, leading to the live EP release, Origami Angel Broke Minecraft.

With the band's newfound success, but inability to tour, they focused on developing a follow-up album. They developed the diverse material set aside from the Somewhere City sessions. The duo had recorded 20 demo songs and had a rough outline for the album around the time of Somewhere City's release. Heagy described the album's music direction as "half Somewhere City 2 and half "experimental...[The Smashing Pumpkins] Mellon Collie And The Infinite Sadness if the songs were about 60% as long". Heagy noted that he knew that the album would likely be interpreted to be about the COVID-19 pandemic, but was entirely written prior to it in 2019, and was only recorded during the pandemic. On March 25, 2021, the band announced their sophomore double-album Gami Gang, releasing the lead single "Neutrogena Spektor" the following day. Gami Gang released on April 30, 2021, with reviewers generally believing they had released a very different, yet equally good, album as Somewhere City. Exclaim! concluded that "With so much happening, it's inevitably not as musically or thematically concise and poignant as Somewhere City... [but Gami Gang is] like a room full of toys: You can pick up wherever you want and play for as long as you like, and you're bound to end up with a smile on your face." Post-release, the band spoke of touring in support, but only sparingly when and where it was deemed safe for people to be together during the COVID-19 pandemic.

=== Further EPs and The Brightest Days (2022–2023) ===
On September 30, 2022, the band surprise-released a new, three song EP, Re: Turn, followed by a second three song EP, Depart, four days later. The releases showed even further extremes for the band's sound than illustrated in Gami Gang. With Re: Turn, the band explored a stripped down, mellow sound of acoustic guitars and drum machine that was created to sound like "coffee shop friendly indie pop". Depart, on the other hand, consisted of three songs in a frantic, dissonant hardcore music style. The two had been recorded in secrecy during the early days of the COVID-19 pandemic. The duo had always planned on recording some more mellow content found in Re: Turn, and Depart was recorded as a counterpoint to the release, as both a way to make sure their ideas for heavier music were not wasted, and as an outlet of their frustrations and fears about the COVID pandemic.

On June 16, 2023, the band released a mixtape The Brightest Days. The release had been written during the initial 2020 COVID-19 lockdowns, and later revisited and recorded in August 2022. The release sees the duo grappling with the loss of summers of their youth, something they specifically felt with the lockdowns. Unlike prior releases, where they would take songs to create a theme, with The Brightest Days, they started with the theme, and then wrote songs around it. The album's uncommon length of 22 minutes across 8 songs - longer than an EP but shorter than a typical traditional studio album - lead the band to label it a mixtape instead. Like their prior albums, the mixtape was well-received, with Paste concluding that "these eight songs that are over as quickly as they begin. But that's a vital part of the appeal. What's fleeting can also be memorable." The band embarked on an international tour following its release, including North America, the United Kingdom, and Japan.

=== Feeling Not Found (2024–present) ===
In May 2024, the band released a new single, "Fruit Wine", ahead of their North American tour with alternative rock band Microwave. In July 2024, they released two further new songs and announced their third studio album, Feeling Not Found which was released September 27, 2024 on Counter Intuitive Records. The album received Stereogum's "Album of the Week", while "Dirty Mirror Selfie" made the publication's top "Songs of the Year" list. In September 2025, the duo released their first new music in a year, with the song "Back to Life", their contribution to their record label's tenth anniversary compilation album Cosmic Debris Vol. 2.

They will support Silverstein and Story of the Year on tour in 2026.

== Musical style and influences ==
Origami Angel's style of rock music is often described as emo, indie rock, pop punk, and easycore. They have been described as being part of the fifth wave of emo, though Heagy has stated it is more accurate to label them as part of a hypothetical "second wave of easycore".

Heagy cites influence from Barenaked Ladies, Yes, Prince Daddy & The Hyena, Weezer, Lil Uzi Vert, and fellow D.C. emo bands like The Obsessives.

== Members ==
- Ryland Heagy – vocals, guitars, bass (2016–present)
- Pat Doherty – drums (2016–present)

== Discography ==
Studio albums

- Somewhere City (2019, Chatterbot Records)
- Gami Gang (2021, Counter Intuitive Records)
- Feeling Not Found (2024, Counter Intuitive Records)

Mixtapes

- The Brightest Days (2023, Counter Intuitive Records)

EPs

- Quiet Hours (2017, Chatterbot Records)
- Doing the Most (2018, Chatterbot Records)
- Holy Split (2019, Counter Intuitive Records, collaboration with Commander Salamander)
- Gen 3 (2019, Counter Intuitive Records)
- Origami Angel Broke Minecraft (2020, Counter Intuitive Records, remix album)
- Re: Turn (2022, Counter Intuitive Records)
- Depart (2022, Counter Intuitive Records)

Singles

- "Hey There" (2017)
- "Mark My Words" (2017)
- "24 Hr Drive-Thru" (2019)
- "Doctor Whomst" (2019)
- "Jazzy Whomst" (2020, charity single)
- "Neutrogena Spektor" (2021)
- "Greenbelt Station" (2021)
- "Footloose Cannonball Brothers" (2021)
- "Blanket Statement" (2021)
- "Thank You, New Jersey" (2023)
- "My PG County Summer" (2023)
- "Fruit Wine" (2024)
- "Dirty Mirror Selfie / Where Blue Light Blooms" (2024)
- "Wretched Trajectory" (2024)
- "Sixth Cents (Get It?) / secondgradefoofight" (2024)
- "Back to Life" (2025)
- "Play Around the Crit / Compound Eyes" (2026)
