= Counter Intuitive Records =

Independent record label based in Boston

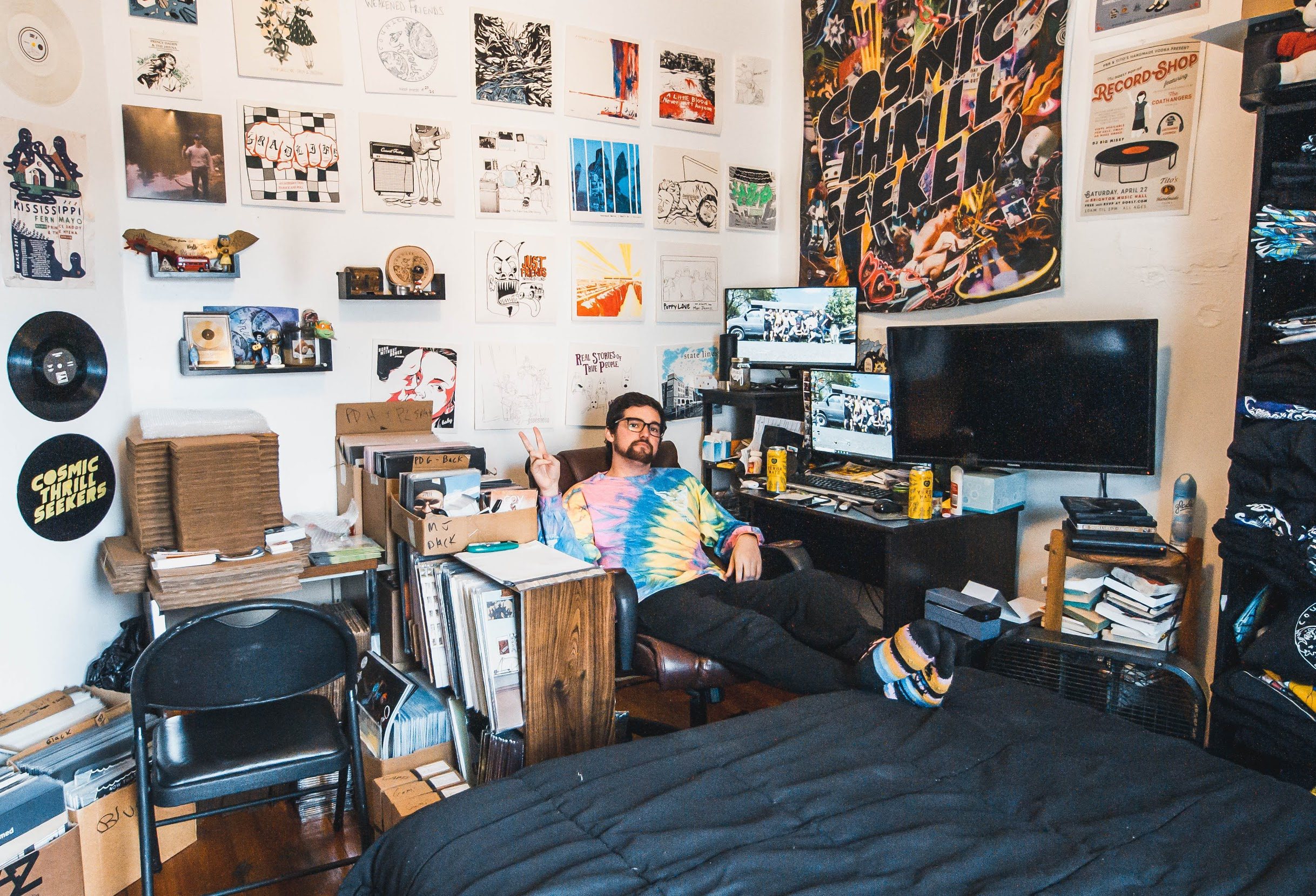
- Jake Sulzer in Boston based Label HQ
- Founded: 2015
- Founder: Jake Sulzer
- Genre: Indie rock, emo, punk, pop-punk, ska
- Country of origin: United States
- Location: Boston, Massachusetts
- Official website: counterintuitiverecords.com

Counter Intuitive Records is an American independent record label based in Boston, Massachusetts, known for working with bands such as Oso Oso, Mom Jeans, Origami Angel, and Prince Daddy & The Hyena. The label has also handled distribution for artists such as The Hotelier.

== History ==
The label was started in 2015 by Jake Sulzer, shortly after his college graduation. After stumbling across a demo by the band Bay Faction, Sulzer offered them a record contract. Gaining most traction from releasing records of band's such as Origami Angel, Oso Oso, Skatune Network, Prince Daddy & The Hyena, & Mom Jeans, the label funded the releases of many lesser-known bands in the scene, like Pictures of Vernon.

Counter Intuitive Records opened a storefront in Brookline, Massachusetts on February 15, 2025, where they have records, apparel, and merchandise available for purchase, as well as a section dedicated to retro video games.

== Current artists ==
- Bigger Better Sun
- Combat
- Charmer
- Coupons
- Computer
- Gaffa Tape Sandy
- The Losing Score
- I Love Your Lifestyle
- Insignificant Other
- Kicksie
- Leisure Hour
- Mom Jeans
- Motel TV
- Nervous Dater
- oldsoul
- The Hotelier
- Macseal
- Origami Angel
- Pictures of Vernon
- Plainclothes
- Prince Daddy & The Hyena
- Shalfi
- Skatune Network
- Sleeping Patterns
- Snooze
- Teamonade
- Yeah Is What We Have
- Riley!
- Tiger Really?

== Former artists ==
- Bay Faction
- Bears in Trees
- Born Without Bones
- Casual Friday
- Equipment
- FES
- Graduating Life
- Hemingway
- Hospital Bracelet
- Jail Socks
- Jordan Krimston
- Just Friends
- Kississippi
- Kicksie
- Meet Me in Montauk
- Motel TV
- Natural Flavor
- No Better
- Oliver Houston
- Oso Oso
- Plainclothes
- Retirement Party
- Rozwell Kid
- Shiver.
- Sleeping Patterns
- sports.
- State Lines
- Toy Cars
- Walter Etc.
- Weakened Friends
- Who Are The Toms
- Who Loves You
