= Modern Baseball discography =

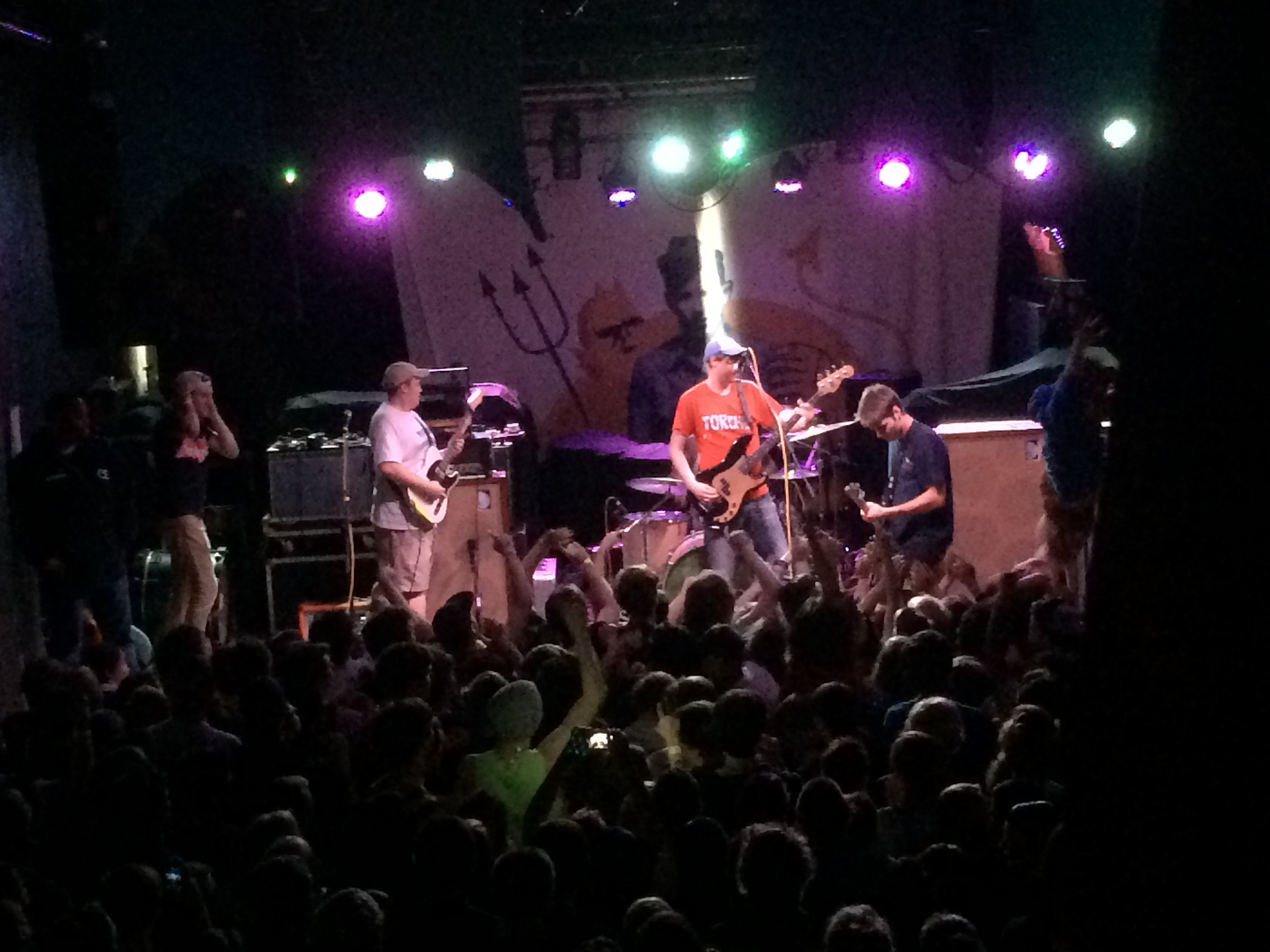
- Studio albums: 3
- EPs: 5
- Live albums: 1
- Compilation albums: 1
- Singles: 4
- Music videos: 5

The discography of Modern Baseball, an American rock band formed in 2011, consists of three studio albums, four extended plays, six singles, and five music videos.

== Studio albums ==
List of studio albums
Title	Album details	Peak chart positions			Sales
Title	Album details	US	AUS	UK	Sales
Sports	Released: November 27, 2012; Label: Lame-O (LMO:001); Format: CD, CS, DL, LP	—	—	—	
You're Gonna Miss It All	Released: February 11, 2014; Label: Run for Cover (RFC:096); Format: CD, CS, DL, LP	97	—	—	WW: 12,000+; US: 30,000
Holy Ghost	Released: May 13, 2016; Label: Run for Cover (RFC:152); Format: CD, CS, DL, LP	53	26	161	
"—" denotes releases that did not chart or were not released in that territory.

== Live Albums ==
Title	Album details
MOBO Presents: The Perfect Cast LP feat. Modern Baseball (30th Anniversary Ultimate Edition)	Released: October 23, 2025; Label: Lame-O

== Compilation albums ==
List of compilation albums
Title	Album details
Techniques	Released: September 15, 2014; Label: Lame-O (LMO:013); Format: CD, DL

== Extended plays ==
Title	Album details
The Nameless Ranger	Released: November 20, 2011; Label: Self-Released, Lame-O
Couples Therapy (with Marietta)	Released: May 10, 2012; Label: Self-Released, Lame-O
Modern Baseball/The Hundred Acre Woods	Released: July 16, 2013; Label: Lame-O
MoBo Presents: The Perfect Cast	Released: October 23, 2015; Label: Lame-O
Modern Baseball/The Superweaks/Thin Lips	Released: February 24, 2017; Label: Big Scary Monsters

== Singles ==
List of singles, showing year released and album name
Title	Year	Album
"The Weekend"	2012	Sports
"Phone Tag"	2013	4-way V-Day split
"Voting Early"	2013	Fest 12 Split
"Your Graduation"	2014	You're Gonna Miss It All
"Charlie Black"	2014	You're Gonna Miss It All
"Revenge of the Nameless Ranger"	2015	MoBo Presents: The Perfect Cast
"The Thrash Particle"	2015	MoBo Presents: The Perfect Cast
"Everyday"/"Apple Cider, I Don't Mind"	2016	Holy Ghost
"Bart to the Future Part 2: The Musical"	2016	30 Days, 50 Songs
"Rock Bottom - Demo"	2024	Two Demos
"Pothole - Demo"	2024	Two Demos

== Videography ==
List of music videos, showing year released and director
Title	Year	Director
"The Weekend"	2013	Kyle Thrash
"Pothole"	2014	Kyle Thrash
"Your Graduation"	2014	Kyle Thrash
"Rock Bottom"	2015	Kyle Thrash
"Wedding Singer"	2016	Kyle Thrash
