= MoBo Presents: The Perfect Cast =

MOBO Presents: The Perfect Cast EP featuring Modern Baseball

EP by Modern Baseball
- Released: October 23, 2015
- Genre: Midwest emo
- Label: Lame-O
- Producer: Modern Baseball

Modern Baseball chronology
Techniques (2014)	MOBO Presents: The Perfect Cast EP featuring Modern Baseball (2015)	Holy Ghost (2016)

MoBo Presents: The Perfect Cast EP Featuring Modern Baseball is the second EP by rock band Modern Baseball.

== Background ==
On October 23, 2015, Modern Baseball released MOBO Presents: The Perfect Cast EP featuring Modern Baseball via Lame-O Records. The album was the first after a long wait since the band's previous full-length album You're Gonna Miss It All. Two singles were released from the EP ("Revenge of the Nameless Ranger" and "The Thrash Particle").

In 2025, the EP was rereleased as MOBO Presents: The Perfect Cast LP feat. Modern Baseball (30th Anniversary Ultimate Edition), which included the original six tracks from the EP, and seven live recordings mixed by Jake Katz and mastered by Ian Farmer.

PunkNews gave the album 4 out of 5 stars, describing the sound like a bridge between the band's first two studio albums.

== Track listing ==
No.	Title	Writer(s)	Length
1.	"The Waterboy Returns"	Bren Lukens; Cameron Boucher	2:43
2.	"Alpha Kappa Fall of Troy the Movie Part Deux (2 Disc Director's Cut)"	Jake Ewald	2:54
3.	"Infinity Exposed"	Lukens; Ewald; Ian Farmer; Sean Huber	2:08
4.	"The Thrash Particle"	Lukens	3:23
5.	"...And Beyond"	Lukens; Ewald; Farmer; Huber	2:22
6.	"Revenge of the Nameless Ranger"	Lukens	2:35
Total length:			16:05

== Personnel ==
Modern Baseball

- Bren Lukens – vocals, guitar
- Jake Ewald – vocals, guitar
- Ian Farmer – bass, vocals
- Sean Huber – drums, vocals

Others

- Producers – Modern Baseball
- Engineers – Jacob Ewald, Ian Farmer
- Mix – Matt Schimelfenig
- Mastered – Ryan Schwabe
- Artwork – Beau Brynes
- Photography – Jessica Flynn
- Calligraphy – Perry Shall
- Additional Lyrics – Cameron Boucher
- Tambourine – Andrew Dole
