= Kississippi =

Musical artist (born 1995)

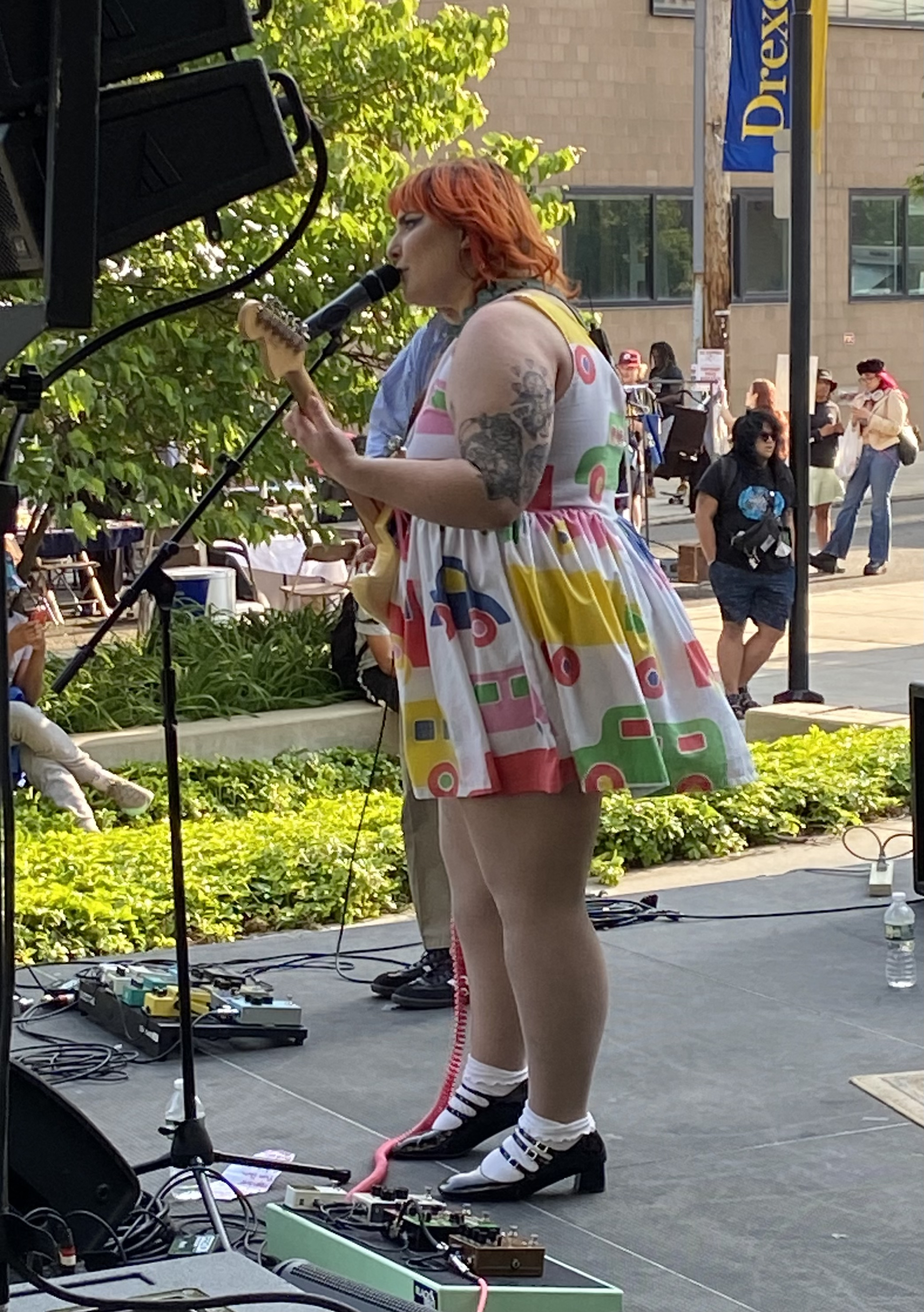
- Reynolds performing as Kississippi at Drexel University in 2023

Background information
- Birth name: Zoe Allaire Reynolds
- Also known as: Kissy
- Born: April 24, 1995 (age 29); Philadelphia, U.S.
- Genres: Indie rock; indie pop; indie folk; dream pop
- Occupations: Singer-songwriter; musician
- Instruments: Vocals; guitar; keytar
- Years active: 2014–present
- Labels: Alcopop! Records; Soft Speak Records; Triple Crown Records
- Website: kississippiband.com

Kississippi is the solo pop and indie folk project of Philadelphia-based singer-songwriter Zoe Allaire Reynolds.

== History ==
Zoe Reynolds recorded her first acoustic demos – which later became the 2014 EP I Can Feel You in my Hair Still — in her mom's laundry room, and the EP's online release received early attention from music publications.

Together with guitarist Colin Kupson, Reynolds wrote and recorded her second EP, 2015's We Have No Future, We’re All Doomed with Jake Ewald of Modern Baseball and Slaughter Beach, Dog. The album, released on Soft Speak Records, was named after a friend's yearbook message, and ultimately became a memorial line after their death.

After parting ways with Kupson post-tour, Reynolds emerged once again as a solo artist. The result of these occupations was her debut full-length album Sunset Blush, named after a boxed wine she and her friends drank and their subsequent long, late-night conversations. She recorded the album with friend Kyle Pulley of Thin Lips, who acted as a collaborator, at Headroom Studios in Philadelphia. After the album was picked up by SideOneDummy, a label that later downsized, Reynolds chose to self-release it on a vanity label she named Bug Crusher Records to stay true to the original April 2018 release date.

On October 8, 2020, Reynolds announced her signing to Triple Crown Records, alongside a new single called "Around Your Room".

== Discography ==
EPs

- I Can Feel You in My Hair Still (2014)
- We Have No Future, We're All Doomed – Soft Speak Records (2015)
- damned if i do it for you (2024)

Full Length Albums

- Sunset Blush – Alcopop! Records (UK) / Bug Crusher Records (US) (2018)
- Mood Ring – Triple Crown Records (2021)
