= Small Circle =

- Origin: Philadelphia, Pennsylvania
- Genres: Emo, indie rock
- Years active: 2016–present
- Label: Flower Girl Records
- Members: Cameron Boucher; Marissa D'Elia; Charlie Singer; Adam Ackerman
- Past members: Sean Hallock
- Website: smallcircle.bandcamp.com

Small Circle is an American emo punk band from Philadelphia, Pennsylvania. The group was founded by vocalist Marissa D'Elia, vocalist/guitarist Cameron Boucher (Sorority Noise/Old Gray), bassist Adam Ackerman (Sorority Noise/Old Gray), and drummer Sean Hallock (Rozwell Kid). Following Hallock's departure, he was replaced on the drums by Charlie Singer, also of Old Gray and later Sorority Noise.

== History ==
Singers Marissa D'Elia and Cameron Boucher first met in 2012. In January 2016, Boucher sent D'Elia several instrumentals he had recorded with Adam Ackerman, his bandmate in Sorority Noise and Old Gray, and Sean Hallock, drummer for Rozwell Kid, for her to write and record vocals for. At this time, Boucher had never heard her sing or even read anything she had written. They would go on to release their first song, "Please Don't Touch The Moon", through The A.V. Club on March 30, 2016, who noted that due to the members' other projects, the band could be considered a "supergroup". On April 1, 2016, the band released their first EP, Melatonin. Later that month, Small Circle were part of a benefit album for several charities through Get Better Records. Melatonin was re-released physically on cassette in May 2017, including a new song, "Sameness".

In August 2017, Small Circle announced their first full-length record, Cyclical, and premiered a song off of the forth-coming record on The Fader. A second song, "Mornings", was debuted through Stereogum on August 23, 2017 before the album's release on September 8, 2017. The album was supported with a short tour with Remo Drive and McCafferty. On release, Exclaim! gave Cyclical a 7 out of 10, drawing comparisons to Death Cab for Cutie and Tigers Jaw while also noting that D'Elia "has things to say and is still developing the voice with which to say them." Other reviewers alternatively praised D'Elia's inexperience, noting that it felt charming or relatable.

On October 13, 2017, Small Circle opened for Modern Baseball on the first night of their final three night run of shows.

== Band members ==
Current members

- Cameron Boucher - Vocals/Guitar
- Marissa D'Elia - Vocals
- Charlie Singer - Drums
- Adam Ackerman - Bass

Former members

- Sean Hallock - Drums

== Discography ==
Studio albums

- Cyclical (2017)

EPs

- Melatonin (2016)

Compilations

- Get Better Records: Benefit Mix Tape Vol. 4 (2016)
