= Holy Ghost (Modern Baseball album) =

Studio album by Modern Baseball
- Released: May 13, 2016
- Studio: The Headroom, Philadelphia, Pennsylvania, U.S.
- Genre: Emo; indie rock
- Length: 27:24
- Label: Run for Cover
- Producer: Joe Reinhart

Modern Baseball chronology
| MoBo Presents: The Perfect Cast (2015) | Holy Ghost (2016) |

Holy Ghost is the third and final studio album by the American rock band Modern Baseball, released on May 13, 2016. The album follows their third EP, The Perfect Cast, which was released on October 23, 2015, via Lame-O Records, as well as their sophomore studio album, You're Gonna Miss It All, released in 2014, and their compilation album, Techniques, also released in 2014.

== Background ==
Holy Ghost is the first Modern Baseball album that was not recorded by the band themselves—instead, the members obtained the help of Joe Reinhart (Hop Along, Algernon Cadwallader). The album was recorded at Headroom Studios in Philadelphia. The album is split in half between both guitarist/frontmen, Jake Ewald and Bren Lukens (Ewald wrote the first six songs and Lukens wrote the last five). Ewald's songs mainly revolved around the passing of his grandfather while Lukens focuses on their struggles with mental illness and depression.

== Release and promotion ==
On February 24, 2016, the album was officially confirmed. On March 3, two songs were published online for free via NPR. The first, "Everyday", was written by Jake Ewald and the second, "Apple Cider, I Don't Mind", was written by Bren Lukens. On April 4, the band released a documentary directed by actor and director Kyle Thrash entitled "Tripping in the Dark". The documentary focused mainly on the formation of the band and the making of the album, including Ewald's struggle with his grandfather's death and Lukens' near suicide attempt and subsequent recovery. The video for "Wedding Singer" was released on May 5.

The album's Vinyl release is unique in that the sides are titled Side J and Side B named after Jake Ewald having written the songs on side A and Bren Lukens having written the songs on side B. Additionally the Vinyl release includes an undocumented hidden track on side B of the vinyl release. This track is not found on any other release.

Modern Baseball announced plans to tour on March 3, 2016, setting the first dates for shortly after the release of the new album. The tour kicked off on May 25, 2016, with Joyce Manor and Thin Lips opening. On August 3, Modern Baseball announced they would be supporting Brand New and The Front Bottoms on tour starting in October 2016. At the conclusion of the Brand New tour, Modern Baseball will be playing a string of shows internationally.

== Critical reception ==
Professional ratings
Aggregate scores
| Source | Rating |
|---|---|
| Metacritic | 81/100 |
Review scores
| Source | Rating |
| The A.V. Club | A− |
| Consequence of Sound | B− |
| The Line of Best Fit | 9/10 |
| Pitchfork | 7.7/10 |
| Allmusic | 3.5/5 stars |

The album was met with acclaim by critics, with most of them noting that Modern Baseball showed growth and maturity with the content of Holy Ghost. Holy Ghost holds a score of 81/100 on Metacritic indicating universal acclaim. On June 4, 2016, Holy Ghost reached No. 53 on the US Billboard 200.

=== Accolades ===
| Publication | Accolade | Year | Rank | Ref. |
|---|---|---|---|---|
| The A.V. Club | The A.V. Club's Top 50 Albums of 2016 | 2016 | 14 | |
| Stereogum | The 50 Best Albums of 2016 | 2016 | 50 | |

== Track listing ==
All music is composed by Modern Baseball.

| No. | Title | Length |
|---|---|---|
| 1. | "Holy Ghost" | 1:01 |
| 2. | "Wedding Singer" | 2:48 |
| 3. | "Note to Self" | 3:49 |
| 4. | "Mass" | 1:45 |
| 5. | "Everyday" | 3:04 |
| 6. | "Hiding" | 3:45 |
| 7. | "Coding These to Lukens" | 1:29 |
| 8. | "Breathing in Stereo" | 1:43 |
| 9. | "Apple Cider, I Don't Mind" | 1:57 |
| 10. | "What If..." | 2:07 |
| 11. | "Just Another Face" | 3:57 |
| 12. | "Stranger Rises (Hidden Track, Vinyl Exclusive)" | 1:32 |

== Personnel ==
Modern Baseball

- Jake Ewald – vocals, guitars, keyboards
- Bren Lukens – vocals, guitars
- Ian Farmer – bass guitar, vocals, keyboards
- Sean Huber – drums, percussion, vocals

Additional Musicians

- Cameron Boucher – additional vocals (track 7)

Technical

- Joe Reinhart – producer; recording engineer
- Mark Quinlan – drum technician
- Ryan Schwabe – mastering engineer
- Kyle Pulley – editing
- Drew Taurisano – studio assistant
- Shane Woods – studio assistant
- Isabel Imperatore – layout
- Jessica Flynn – photography

== Charts ==
| Chart (2016) | Peak position |
|---|---|
| Australian Albums (ARIA) | 26 |
| UK Albums Chart | 161 |
| US Billboard 200 | 53 |
| US Top Alternative Albums (Billboard) | 3 |
| US Vinyl Albums (Billboard) | 1 |
