= Your Graduation =

Single by Modern Baseball

from the album You're Gonna Miss It All
- Released: December 10, 2013
- Genre: Pop-punk; emo; folk-punk
- Length: 2:43
- Label: Run for Cover
- Songwriter: Modern Baseball
- Producer: Modern Baseball

Modern Baseball singles chronology
"The Weekend" (2012)	"Your Graduation" (2013)	"Rock Bottom" (2015)

Music video
- "Your Graduation" on YouTube

"Your Graduation" is a song recorded by the American emo band Modern Baseball for their second studio album, You're Gonna Miss It All (2014). It was released as its debut single from You're Gonna Miss It All on December 10, 2013, through Run for Cover Records. "Your Graduation" centers on the nostalgia and angst of a high school graduation, with its central narrator struggling to get over a break-up.

"Your Graduation" became the band's most popular song, and music critics commended its sound and tone. The single's music video was directed by Kyle Thrash and filmed at FDR Skatepark in the band's hometown of Philadelphia in the midst of a polar vortex. Vulture put the song on a list of all-time great emo songs.

== Background ==
Modern Baseball emerged in the early 2010s as part of the fourth-wave emo scene in the U.S. The quartet formed in Philadelphia, Pennsylvania, the combination of vocalist/guitarists Bren Lukens and Jacob Ewald, both originally from Maryland. At college, they met and added Sean Huber on drums and Ian Farmer on bass. Their first full-length, Sports (2012), was released through local label Lame-O Records, and showcased a mix of upbeat and catchy lo-fi pop-punk. The group developed a following, particularly on social media, and soon secured a deal with Boston-based independent label Run for Cover, the home of emo luminaries Tigers Jaw, Title Fight, Citizen, and Turnover. In 2014, they released their second LP through the label, titled You're Gonna Miss It All.

"Your Graduation" depicts a narrator at a high school graduation party, mulling over a failed relationship. In the intro, they admit it has been difficult to get over a break-up: "It’s been three whole years of me thinkin' bout you everyday / Sometimes for hours, sometimes in passing." Lukens largely carries the vocals throughout the track, with drummer Sean Huber making an appearance for the song's second verse. The song was first made available to stream on December 10, 2013, alongside an announcement of the band's second album.

== Music video ==
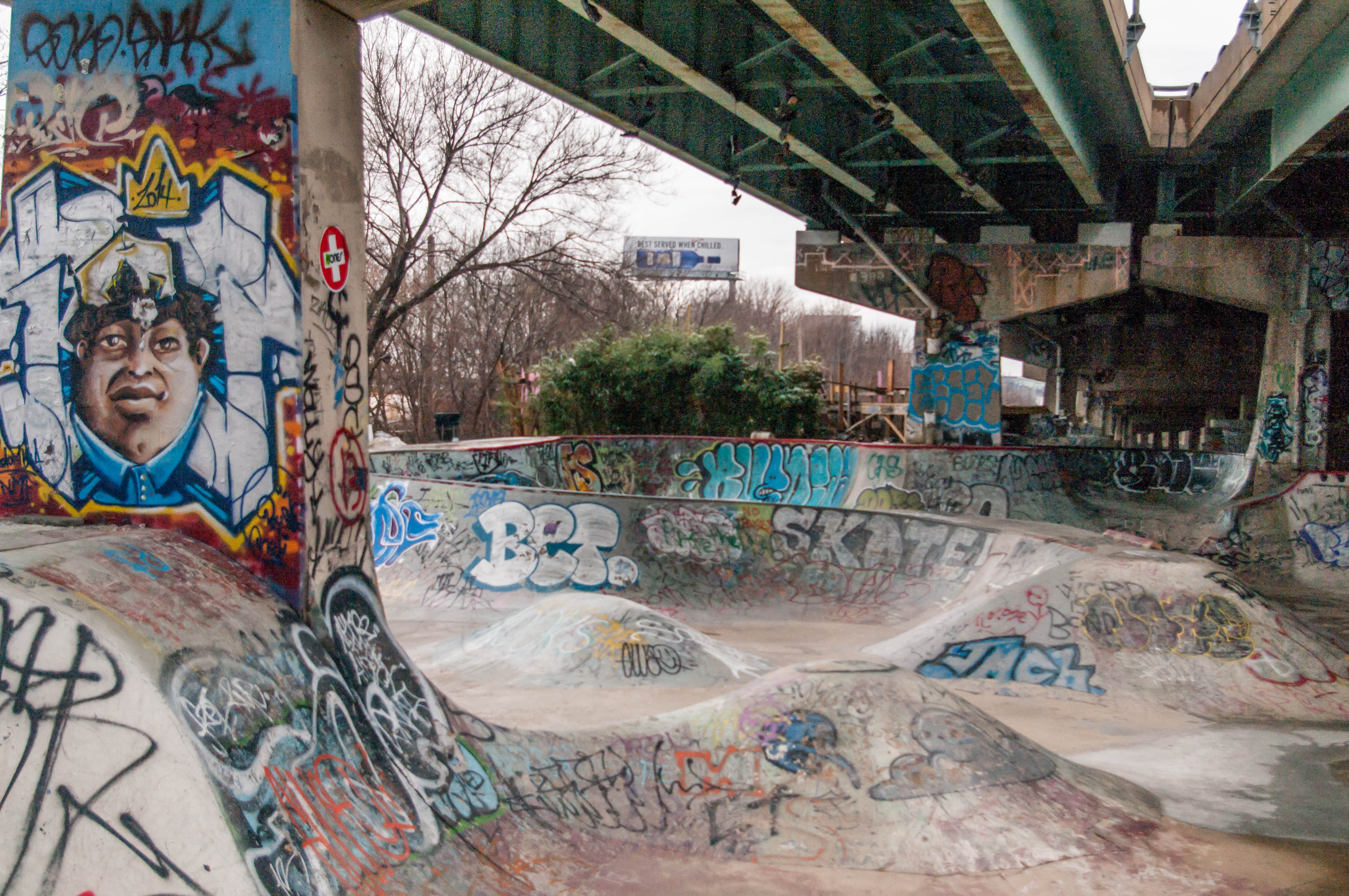
The FDR Skatepark in 2014, where part of the music video was filmed.

The music video for "Your Graduation" was released on March 5, 2014, premiering on the music site Noisey, an offshoot of Vice. The video was directed by Kyle Thrash, who also helmed the band's debut single, "The Weekend". The clip was shot in Philadelphia, with live performance shots filmed at FDR Skatepark, a historic skatepark beneath an overpass of Interstate 95. The band invited fans on their personal Facebook page to take part in the video, with fan-site Property of Zack furthering promotion. It ended up snowing during the video shoot, as it was filmed amid a polar vortex taking the country by hold at the time. "Standing in the rain while it was 17 degrees outside was one of the worst things I have ever experienced, but it was definitely worth it," Lukens admitted. The band posted a behind-the-scenes clip later that month, documenting the video shoot.

John Vettese at WXPN opined that "its long shots of a forlorn [Bren] Lukens staring off into the distance with various lady friends at his side, the video depicts late-college ennui and post-college depression to a tee." Writer Dan Ozzi at Noisey noted that "The video captures all those nostalgic moments: the long awkward conversations, the crippling isolation, and also the skateboarding and partying with your buds."

== Reception ==
"Your Graduation" received positive reviews from contemporary music critics. Collin Brennan at Consequence called the track a distillation of "everything Modern Baseball does well, with its taut song structure and painfully honest lyrics rising to a climax in Huber's explosive verse." James Rettig at Stereogum concurred, writing that the charms of the band shine best on "Graduation". Kevin McFarland at the A.V. Club said it "captures exactly the right mood for dwelling on the minute details of past regrets." Ian Cohen at Pitchfork compared the sound to fellow Philadelphia punk rock heroes the Dead Milkmen. Fred Thomas at AllMusic singled out the song as the most biting among the album's rush of "peppy and ceaselessly upbeat tunes."

Retrospective reviews have similarly remained positive. In 2017, Rob Arcand at Spin wrote that the song "crystalized a certain adolescent experience with a racing intensity as perfect for partying as it is those late nights alone post-breakup." Vulture later placed the song on its list of the 100 Best Emo Songs at number 72, with columnist Emma Garland writing, "It's such a vivid retelling of unrequited love it almost prompts a smile. [...] A far cry from the revenge fantasy of emo's mainstream tenure in the aughts, Modern Baseball have upgraded the narrative to include not just the sadness of giving up but the release of moving on."

== Credits and personnel ==
Credits adapted from the liner notes for You're Gonna Miss It All.

Locations

- Mixed at Miner Street Studios in Philadelphia, Pennsylvania.
- Mastering at Studio 4 in Conshohocken, Pennsylvania.

Personnel

- Bren Lukens – vocals, guitar, production, engineer
- Jacob Ewald – vocals, guitar, production, engineer
- Ian Farmer – vocals, bass guitar, production, engineer
- Sean Huber – vocals, drums, production, engineer
- Patrick Loundas – drum engineering
- Jonathan Low – mixing
- Will Yip – mastering engineer
