= The Flat Stanleys =

American emo band

The Flat Stanleys were an American emo band from Baltimore County, Maryland, consisting of Brian Radin, Colin Lagator, Steven Richards and Dustin Magidson. The band formed in 2016 and released four EPs over the course of 2 years.

== History ==
The band was formed in June 2016, originally consisting of Radin and Lagator performing 'joke songs' in their basement. Their first album, The Flat Stanleys, was released on October 6, 2016, with a demo version being released the following year. Packing was released on March 25, 2017, as a split EP with Tim Neil. Dancing to Dad Rock, their third EP, was released on July 7, 2017. The album was recorded with Jake Ewald, vocalist and guitarist of Modern Baseball and later Slaughter Beach, Dog, with Ewald's name making an appearance on a track.. Jake Ewald also is listed as a producer for the EP "Dancing to dad rock".Their final release, the single Too Much and Not The Mood, was released on July 21, 2018. In 2020, the band posted on their X (twitter) account a post detailing mental health issues, and not since released nor posted.

== Musical Style ==
The band has been described as folk punk and indie emo, and are compared to bands such as Modern Baseball and The Front Bottoms.

== Discography ==
EPs

- The Flat Stanleys (2016)
- The Sad Stanleys (2017)
- Packing (2017)
- Dancing to Dad Rock (2017)

Singles

- Too Much and Not The Mood (2018)
