= Techniques (album) =

Compilation album by Modern Baseball
- Released: September 15, 2014
- Genre: Emo, indie rock
- Label: Lame-O

Modern Baseball chronology
You're Gonna Miss It All (2014)	Techniques (2014)	The Perfect Cast (2015)

Techniques is a compilation album by rock band Modern Baseball. It contains 16 tracks which are songs compiled from previous EPs Couples Therapy, The Nameless Ranger and demos from albums Sports and You're Gonna Miss It All. There is also an original song titled "Secret Bonus Track". The name of the album is a reference to the book that the band lifted their name from, Modern Baseball Techniques. Although it is believed they were misremembering the book Modern Baseball Strategies by Paul Richards.

== Track listing ==
1. "Best Friend"
2. "Short"
3. "My Love"
4. "Casket"
5. "Home"
6. "Hope"
7. "It's Cold Out Here"
8. "The Weekend" (Demo)
9. "Tears Over Beers" (Demo)
10. "Phone Tag"
11. "(240)"
12. "Re-Do" (Acoustic)
13. "Voting Early"
14. "Rock Bottom" (Demo)
15. "Pothole" (Demo)
16. "Secret" (Bonus track)
