= Slaughter Beach =

Slaughter Beach may refer to:

- Slaughter Beach, Delaware, a town and beach
- Slaughter Beach (band), Danish indie pop band

== See also ==
- Slaughter Beach, Dog, American indie rock band
- Sunrise on Slaughter Beach, album by Clutch
