= Hurry (band) =

American indie rock band

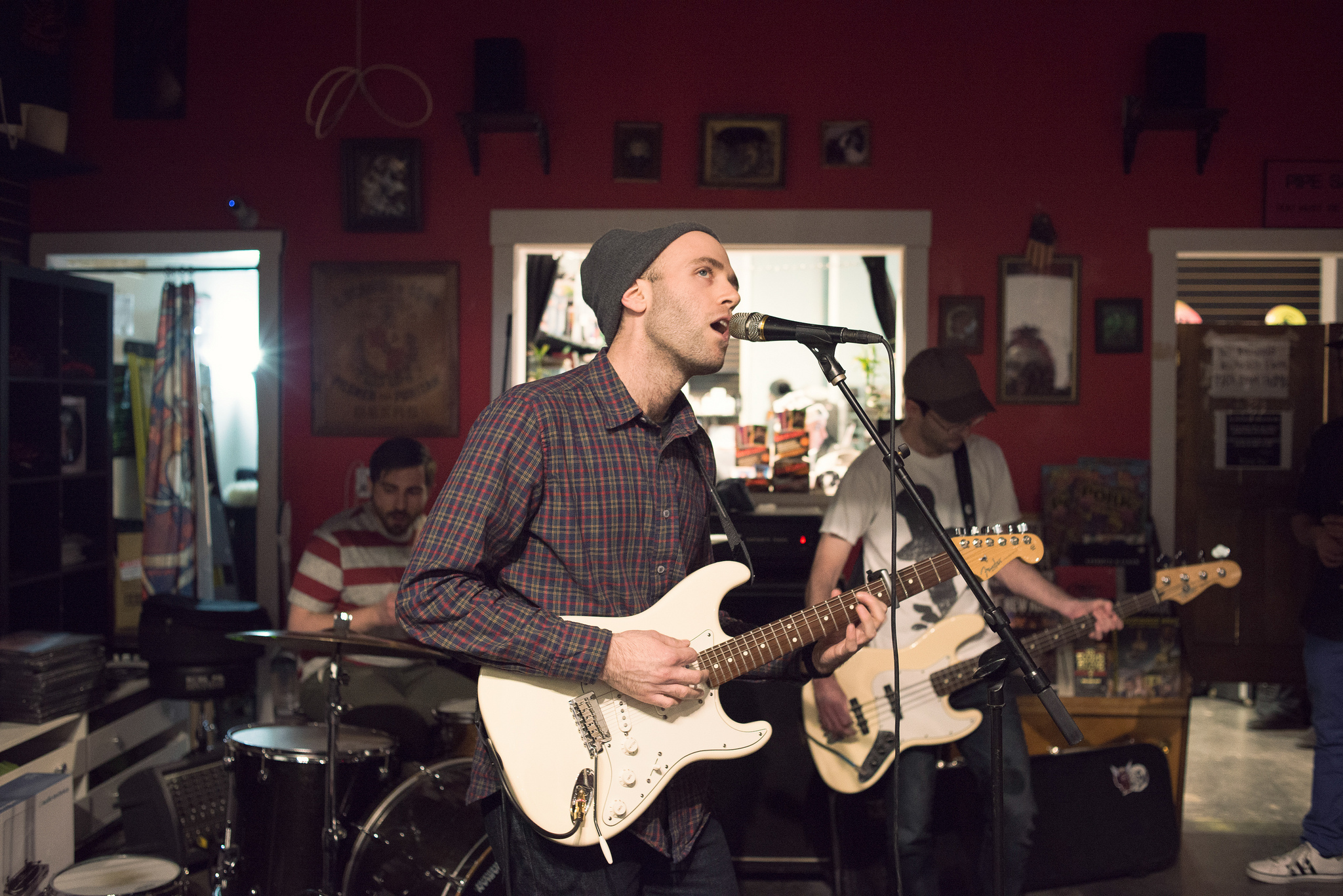
- Hurry performing in February 2015

Background information
- Origin: Philadelphia, Pennsylvania, United States
- Genres: Indie rock, indie pop, power pop, noise pop, emo
- Years active: 2012–present
- Labels: Hot Green, Stereophonodon, Lame-O, Forward Fast
- Spinoff of: Everyone Everywhere
- Members: Matt Scottoline; Joe DeCarolis; Rob DeCarolis; Justin Fox
- Past members: Brendan McHugh; Peter Helmis; Ted Quann; Nick Colletta
- Website: hurrymusic.com

Hurry is an American indie rock band formed in Philadelphia, Pennsylvania, in 2012. The band is composed of Matthew William Scottoline (vocals, guitar), Joseph DeCarolis (bass), Robert DeCarolis (drums), and Justin Fox (guitar).

== History ==
Hurry began as a solo project for principal songwriter Matt Scottoline, bassist of emo revival band Everyone Everywhere. He wrote the first ten to twenty Hurry songs as a way to write his own material and play guitar rather than bass. Scottoline decided to release his home recordings on Bandcamp under the moniker "Hurry," chosen as a self-deprecating joke about his writing process; he writes quickly and rarely finishes a song if it is not completed in a single session. After releasing the demos, Scottoline recruited other musicians to perform the songs live, including Everyone Everywhere guitarist Brendan McHugh and Univox bassist Rob DeCarolis on drums.

As Everyone Everywhere became less active, Hurry coalesced into a trio, adding DeCarolis's cousin and Psychic Teens/Exmaid bassist Joe DeCarolis to round out the lineup. The band signed to Hot Green Records and announced their first album, Everything/Nothing, which was recorded at The Headroom by labelmate Joe Reinhart of Hop Along. The record was preceded by its first single, "Oh Whitney," as a limited cassette release. Its accompanying music video features the band attempting to set a world record for fireworks launched off a guitar, though the record-setting display is blocked by Rob DeCarolis standing in front of the camera. Though the explosive effects were added in post-production, the fireworks were live and caused some anxiety during filming. The band later released a video for "Oozing Positivity" to coincide with Everything/Nothing's cassette release; the video took director Dave Peterson six months to make and depicts the band as "delightfully retro" CGI characters.

Hurry announced their second record Guided Meditation in March 2016 and was released on April 29, 2016 by Lame-O Records. It was recorded at Noisy Little Critter with Mike Bardzik. Prior to release, Scottoline said Guided Meditation will be "more confident" and "not [hide] behind noise as much".

Their third record, Every Little Thought, was announced in January 2017 and was released on February 23.

Their fourth record, Fake Ideas, was announced in May 2021 and was released on June 25. The record is their first as a quartet with the addition of guitarist Justin Fox, who joined the band in August 2019 for live performances.

Their fifth record, Don't Look Back, was announced in June 2023 and was released on August 11.

Their sixth record, Zoned Out, was announced in April 2026 and was released on July 10th.

== Musical style ==
Hurry's sound has been described as power pop, fuzz or noise pop, indie pop, alternative rock and garage rock. They are often cited as early-90s rock revivalists; their influences include Weezer, Teenage Fanclub, Guided by Voices and Dinosaur Jr., though their influences also include older artists such as The Beach Boys and Paul McCartney and peers such as Yuck and Pure X. Yo La Tengo has been cited as a major influence; Scottoline has said their music showed him how an upbeat pop song could be "drenched in noise," which he cites as an important touchstone for Hurry's music. In a separate interview, he said Hurry is "better when [they're] loud."

== In popular culture ==
The song "When I'm With You" was featured in the episode "Bagel" of the FXX series Man Seeking Woman.

"When I'm With You" also appeared in the episode "Here's Where the Story Ends" of the Netflix series Special.

== Discography ==
=== Studio albums ===
Everything/Nothing

- Released: 7 October 2014 (LP, digital), 5 May 2015 (cassette)
- Format: LP, cassette, digital download
- Label: Hot Green Records (LP, digital), Stereophonodon Records (cassette)

Guided Meditation

- Released: 29 April 2016
- Format: LP, CD, cassette, digital download
- Label: Lame-O Records (LP, digital), Forward Fast (cassette)

Every Little Thought

- Released: 23 February 2018
- Format: LP, CD, digital download
- Label: Lame-O Records (LP, CD, digital)

Fake Ideas

- Released: 25 June 2021
- Format: LP, CD, digital download
- Label: Lame-O Records (LP, CD, digital)

Don't Look Back

- Released: 11 August 2023
- Format: LP, digital download
- Label: Lame-O Records (LP, digital)

Zoned Out

- Released: 10 July 2026
- Format: LP, CD, digital download
- Label: Lame-O Records (LP, CD, digital)

=== EPs ===
Hurry

- Released: February 2012 (digital download), 16 May 2012 (CD, cassette)
- Format: cassette, digital download
- Label: Self-released

Casual Feelings

- Released: 21 October 2016
- Format: EP, digital download
- Label: Lame-O Records (EP, digital)

AGL Presents: Hurry [5.5.18]

- Released: 30 May 2018
- Format: EP, digital download
- Label: The Alternative (digital)

Frustrate You

- Released: 26 April 2019
- Format: EP, digital download
- Label: Lame-O Records (EP, digital)

=== Singles ===
"Oh Whitney" from the album Everything/Nothing

- Released: 14 January 2014
- Format: Cassette, digital download
- Label: Hot Green Records

"Nothing to Say" from the album Guided Meditation

- Released: 22 March 2016
- Format: Digital download
- Label: Lame-O Records

=== Other appearances ===
Strength in Weakness (Split EP with Modern Baseball, Beach Slang, Spraynard, Marietta and The Weaks to raise money for United Cerebral Palsy)

- Released: 3 February 2015
- Format: 12" EP, digital download
- Label: Lame-O Records
- Tracks: "Shake It Off"

Silver Linings (Charity compilation to raise money for Punk Talks, an organization providing free mental health services to musicians and industry workers)

- Released: 30 September 2015
- Format: Digital download
- Tracks: "Oozing Positivity"

Philly Rock Comp Volume 3 (Compilation by 502 South, a Philadelphia DIY collective, and The Art is Not Dead, a Philadelphia non-profit for supporting artists)

- Released: 30 January 2016
- Format: Digital download, CD
- Tracks: "Oozing Positivity"

A Song A Day Keeps The Pain Away (Charity compilation to raise money for the Southern Poverty Law Center)

- Released: 1 January 2017
- Format: Digital download
- Tracks: "When I'm With You (Live)"

Don't Stop Now (Charity compilation to raise money for the ACLU)

- Released: 20 January 2017
- Format: Digital download
- Tracks: "Love Vigilantes" (New Order cover)

Don't Stop Now II (Charity compilation to raise money for RAICES)

- Released: 5 November 2018
- Format: Digital download
- Tracks: "The Waiting" (Tom Petty and the Heartbreakers cover)

Don't Stand So Close to Me: A Lame-O Compilation for Self-Isolation

- Released: 31 March 2020
- Format: Digital download
- Tracks: "How to Keep Composure (Demo)"

A Compilation of Love (Charity compilation to raise money for Women Against Abuse, a Philadelphia-based organization providing services for people experiencing domestic abuse)

- Released: 2 October 2020
- Format: Digital download
- Tracks: "After the Quarantine"
