= Marietta (band) =

American midwest emo band

- Origin: Philadelphia
- Genres: Midwest emo
- Years active: 2011–2015; 2025–present
- Labels: Lame-O; Dog Knights Productions; Kat Kat Records
- Members: Evan Lescallette; Andrew Weigel; Ethan Willard; Ben Johnson

Marietta is an American emo band from Philadelphia, formed in 2011. The band consists of vocalist and guitarists Evan Lescallette and Ethan Willard, bassist Ben Johnson and drummer Andrew Weigel.

== History ==
In 2012, they released a split EP titled Couples Therapy with Modern Baseball, followed by their debut album Summer Death the following year. In 2015, they released their second album As It Were, and "Tucked Into Old Joe" on Strength in Weakness, a split EP with various artists including Modern Baseball and Beach Slang before going on hiatus that December.

On May 1, 2020, Marietta released an EP titled Summer Demos 2012, which contains demos of songs recorded during the band's existence.

The band returned ten years later, playing their first reunion show in October 2025 at the Ukrainian American Citizens' Association in Philadelphia.

== Members ==
- Evan Lescallette – vocals, guitar
- Andrew Weigel – drums, background vocals
- Ethan Willard – guitar, vocals
- Ben Johnson – bass

== Discography ==
=== Studio albums ===
- Summer Death (2013)
- As It Were (2015)

=== EPs ===
- Couples Therapy (with Modern Baseball; 2012)
- Cuts (2016)
- Summer Demos 2012 (2020)
- Strength in Weakness (split EP between Modern Baseball, Spraynard, Hurry, and Beach Slang; 2015)
