= The Hundred Acre Woods (band) =

US musical group

- Genres: Indie folk
- Years active: 2009–present
- Label: Lame-O Records
- Members: Will Davis; Nick Diplacido; Brandon Harrison; Zack Reinhardt; Winthrop Stevens

The Hundred Acre Woods is an American indie folk band from Chester County, Pennsylvania.

== History ==
The Hundred Acre Woods began in 2009. A years later, they began recording their first self-titled EP, which was released in 2011. as well as their first full-length album, Mountaineers Are Always Free. In 2013, the band released a 7-inch split with fellow Pennsylvanian band Modern Baseball. Also in 2013, The Hundred Acre Woods were featured on a Topshelf Records split alongside Modern Baseball, Julia Brown, and Old Gray. In 2014, the band released a 7-inch EP titled Cold In The Morning.
