= Julia Brown (band) =

American indie pop band

- Origin: Baltimore, Maryland
- Genres: Indie rock; indie pop; lo-fi; bedroom pop
- Years active: 2013–2015
- Label: Birdtapes
- Past members: Sam Ray; John Toohey; Alec Simke; Caroline White; Dan Collins

Julia Brown was an American indie pop band from Baltimore, Maryland. Much of their music is defined by lofi recording, usually accomplished by recording directly onto cassette tapes.

== History ==
Julia Brown began in early 2013 after the break up of the band Teen Suicide, with the release of their debut studio album to be close to you via Birdtapes. They would feature on a split with Modern Baseball and Old Gray the same year and toured throughout the year until their last concert in October, and the band fell inactive as Sam and Torts reformed Teen Suicide with J2 on guitar soon after. The band (alongside Teen Suicide) would feature prominently on the collaborative project 420 Love Songs, released on various Bandcamp accounts.

In 2014, Julia Brown released their second studio album independently (and on Joy Void Recordings in 2016), titled An Abundance of Strawberries.

In 2018, a compilation, An Abundance of Bsides & Shit, was released on the group's Bandcamp page. In May 2021, the previous compilation was rereleased as An Abundance of B-sides, which contains one additional song, "Closing, On A Roof (Acoustic Demo)".

In December 2021, Ray stated in an Instagram post that no further projects would ever be released under the Julia Brown name.

== Band members ==
- Sam Ray – lead vocals, lead guitar (2013–2015)
- Dan Collins – rhythm guitar, keyboards, bass (2013)
- Alec Simke – bass, keyboards, backing vocals (2013–2015)
- John Toohey – drums (2013–2015)
- Caroline White – viola, backing vocals (2013–2015)

Timeline

== Discography ==
Studio albums

- to be close to you (2013, Birdtapes)
- An Abundance of Strawberries (2014, self-released; 2016, Joy Void Recordings)
- An Abundance of Bsides & Shit (2018, self-released)

Singles

- "Library" B/W "I Wanna Be a Witch" (2013, Birdtapes)
