= The Obsessives =

American rock group

The Obessives
- Origin: Washington, D.C.
- Genres: Indie rock; emo; indie pop
- Years active: 2013-present
- Labels: Lame-O, Near Mint
- Members: Nick Bairatchnyi; Jackson Mansfield; Andrew Wilson; Ben Kaunitz; Joey "Carrotchamp" Cobin; Jordan Krimston
- Website: theobsessives.com

The Obsessives is an American rock band from Washington, D.C.

== History ==
Made up by best friends Nick Bairatchnyi and Jackson Mansfield, The Obsessives started in 2013 as a two-piece band. The outfit was often compared to similar sounding Emo bands, though Bairatchnyi cites a lot of his early inspiration from the band Weatherbox. They self-released their first EP, Die Trying on May 2, 2013.

In 2014 they released two EPs, Bad Friends and Manners, the latter would later be released on Near Mint Record, who also released their debut LP, Heck No, Nancy on September 18, 2015.

On May 6, 2016 the band released a two-song 7" entitled My Pale Red Dot

In late 2016 the band signed to Lame-O Records and self-released a new EP called A Great Meance Weighs Over The City. On March 17, 2017 they released their second full-length album, The Obsessives. In support of this album, the band went on tours with Sorority Noise, Forth Wanderers (band), and Sinai Vessel.

In February 2021 they released an EP titled "Monastery".

== Band members ==
- Nick Bairatchnyi—guitar, bass, vocals
- Jackson Mansfield—drums, guitar, keyboards
- Andrew Wilson - guitar, bass
- Ben Kaunitz - guitar
- Joey "Carrotchamp" Cobin - drums, percussion
- Jordan Krimston - drums, percussion

== Discography ==
Albums

- Heck No, Nancy (Near Mint Records, 2015)
- The Obsessives (Lame-O Records, 2017)
- The Obsessives Deluxe (Lame-O Records, 2019)

EPs

- Die Trying (2013)
- Bad Friends (2014)
- Manners (2014)
- 7" My Pale Red Dot (2016)
- A Great Menace Weighs Over the City (2016)
- Monastery (2021)

== Videography ==
- "Camping" (2015)
- "Surfer Rosa" (2017)
- "You're My God" (2017)
- "Lala" (2021)
