= Troper =

Troper may refer to:

- Morris C. Troper (1892–1962), Jewish-American accountant and US Army officer who helped save Jews from the Holocaust
- Mo Troper, American musician
- a member of TV Tropes
- Troper(s) (possibly related to Byzantine-Greek troparion), manuscript(s) containing musical tropes, such as the Winchester Troper
