= You're Gonna Miss It All =

Studio album by Modern Baseball
- Released: February 11, 2014
- Genres: Emo; indie rock; folk rock; indie folk; pop-punk; folk punk
- Length: 29:30
- Label: Run for Cover
- Producer: Modern Baseball

Modern Baseball chronology
Sports (2012)	You're Gonna Miss It All (2014)	Techniques (2014)

Singles from You're Gonna Miss It All
- 1. "Your Graduation" Released: December 10, 2013; 2. "Charlie Black" Released: January 2014

You're Gonna Miss It All (stylized as "you're gonna miss it all") is the second studio album by American pop punk band Modern Baseball.

== Background ==
Like their debut album Sports (2012), You're Gonna Miss It All was written while the band members were attending college. Unlike Sports which only featured Lukens and Ewald, "we were just excited to have a full band and make [You're Gonna Miss It All] that way", according to Ewald. Discussing writing, Ewald said one member of the group would come up with a lyric "and we'll go run off by ourselves and try to build around that". In an interview with Dirty Water Media, Brendan explained the title of the album was "a joke on Jake," who had gotten up to blow his nose before the finale of a firework show the group was watching when someone said to Jake, "you're gonna miss it all!"

== Release ==
On December 10, 2013, You're Gonna Miss It All was announced for release in February 2014, revealing its track listing. In addition, "Your Graduation" was made available for streaming. Later in December, the group performed a few shows with Bayside, immediately followed by a small number of shows with The Hundred Acre Woods & The Color and Sound in January 2014. You're Gonna Miss It All was made available for streaming on February 4 via Pitchfork, before being released on February 11 through Run for Cover Records. On March 6, a music video was released for "Your Graduation". In March and April, the group supported The Wonder Years on their North American headlining tour. In May, the band supported Real Friends on their tour of the UK and Europe. In June, the group went on a headlining US tour with support from Tiny Moving Parts, the Hotelier and Sorority Noise.

On August 27, a music video was released for "Pothole". In September, the group played a handful of US shows with I Am the Avalanche and Beach Slang, culminating in an appearance at Riot Fest. Following this, the group went on a headlining UK tour with support from Spraynard, Chewing on Tinfoil and Losing Sleep. "Your Graduation" was released as a single on September 29. In October, the group supported The Wonder Years on their headlining US tour. In November and December, the band went on a US tour alongside Knuckle Puck, Crying and Somos with additional support from Walter Mitty and His Makeshift Orchestra, Foxing and Hostage Calm on specific dates. In June and July 2015, the group supported Say Anything on their headlining US tour.

== Reception ==
Professional ratings
Aggregate scores
Source	Rating
Metacritic	76/100
Review scores
Source	Rating
AbsolutePunk	80%
AllMusic	3.5/5 stars
The AU Review	9/10
CMJ	Favorable
Consequence of Sound	B+
Pitchfork	7.2/10
PopMatters	6/10
Punknews.org	4.5/5 stars
Sputnikmusic	3.5/5 stars
Zumic	4/5 stars

It reached No. 97 on the US Billboard 200 and No. 15 on US Alternative Albums. By September 2014, the album had sold over 12,000 copies worldwide. By May 2016, the album had sold almost 30,000 copies in the U.S.

"Your Graduation" appeared on a best-of emo songs list by Vulture. In 2024, Duke Chronicle said the album "solidified [Modern Baseball's] placement in the canon of indie rock and Midwest emo revival."

== Track listing ==
All tracks are written by Modern Baseball.

No.	Title	Length
1.	"Fine, Great"	2:28
2.	"Broken Cash Machine"	1:50
3.	"Rock Bottom"	2:13
4.	"Apartment"	2:47
5.	"The Old Gospel Choir"	2:33
6.	"Notes"	2:16
7.	"Charlie Black"	2:10
8.	"Timmy Bowers"	2:05
9.	"Going to Bed Now"	3:05
10.	"Your Graduation"	2:44
11.	"Two Good Things"	2:49
12.	"Pothole"	2:36
Total length:		29:30

== Personnel ==
=== Modern Baseball ===
- Bren Lukens – lead vocals, guitar, engineer, producer, layout
- Jacob Ewald – lead vocals, guitar, engineer, producer, layout
- Ian Farmer – bass, backing vocals, engineer, producer
- Sean Huber – drums, vocals (lead track 10), engineer, producer

=== Additional personnel ===
- Craig Donatucci – cover photo
- William Lindsay – lap steel (track 6)
- Patrick Loundas – drum engineering
- Jonathan Low – mixing
- Allison Newbold – photography
- Will Yip – mastering

== Chart performance ==
Chart (2014)	Peak position
US Billboard 200	97
US Alternative Albums	15
