= Domino (Diners album) =

Studio album by Diners
- Released: August 18, 2023
- Studio: Trash Treasury, Portland, Oregon, United States
- Genre: Power pop
- Length: 24:54
- Label: Bar/None
- Producer: Mo Troper

Diners chronology
Four Wheels and the Truth (2022)	Domino (2023)

"That's such delicate territory, somewhere between a thematically disconnected 'collection of songs' and a three-hour concept album by The Decemberists about Alger Hiss, or whatever. Domino is one of those rare pop records that actually achieves this, where every song is its own self-contained thing that is also in service to the album."

—Producer Mo Troper on balancing contradictory musical instincts for Domino

Domino is the seventh studio album by American power pop act Diners, released through Bar/None Records on August 18, 2023.

== Reception ==
Editors at AllMusic rated this album 4 out of 5 stars, with critic Marcy Donelson writing this album displays a "knack for endearing melodies, Beatlesque complex harmonies..., lo-fi charm, and an affable bittersweetness". Writing for Paste, Matt Mitchell favorably reviewed single "The Power", comparing it to Big Star and Raspberries. The same publication chose it as the 33rd best song of the year in a mid-2023 list, with Mitchell calling it "a glorious, sun-soaked slice of power pop that lives up to its title". Finally, when the album was released, the publication devoted a feature to reviewing it and interviewing Diners' Blue Broderick and Mitchell again wrote the piece, calling Domino "an entire universe", "bubblegum mastery glossed with retro incantations that fit nicely in a modern, un-retro world", "a wondrous excursion into the limitlessness of epic hooks and saccharine storytelling", and "all killer, no filler for real". Brad Shoup of Pitchfork rated this release 7.3 out of 10, calling it "the most immediate rock Diners has ever attempted".

Paste included this among the 30 best rock albums of 2023.

== Track listing ==
All songs written by Blue Broderick.

1. "Working On My Dreams – 2:35
2. "Domino – 2:32
3. "So What – 2:30
4. "Someday I'll Go Surfing – 2:31
5. "The Power – 2:32
6. "Painted Pictures – 2:57
7. "I Don't Think About You the Way I Used To – 2:40
8. "From My Pillow – 2:31
9. "Your Eyes Look Like Christmas – 1:43
10. "Wisdom – 2:18

== Personnel ==
- Blue Broderick – lead vocals, guitar, bass guitar, piano, keyboard, percussion, vocal harmonies
- Nicolette Dolan – artwork
- Brenden Ramirez – guitar, vocal harmonies
- Jack Shirley – mixing and mastering at Atomic Garden, Oakland, California, United States
- Mo Troper – drums, bass guitar, guitar, percussion, vocal harmonies, recording, production

== See also ==
- 2023 in American music
- List of 2023 albums
