= Cartalk (musician) =

American indie rock musician

- Origin: Pasadena, California, United States
- Genres: Indie rock
- Labels: Lame-O

Chuck Moore, better known by their stage name Cartalk, is an American indie rock musician.

== Early life ==
Moore is from Pasadena, California. They studied songwriting in college at Berklee College of Music. Upon finishing school, Moore moved to Minneapolis before returning to Los Angeles.

== Career ==
In June 2019, Moore released their first song from their yet to be announced debut album, titled "Noonday Devil". Three months later, Moore released another song titled "Wrestling". A third song, "Sleep", was released in December 2019. On September 24, 2020, Moore announced their debut album, Pass Like Pollen, alongside another new song titled "Las Manos". The album was released on October 2, 2020 and was produced by Sarah Tudzin of Illuminati Hotties.

== Discography ==
=== Studio albums ===
- Pass Like Pollen (2020)
