= Headroom Studios =

Recording studio in Philadelphia, Pennsylvania

- Company type: Recording studio
- Industry: Music
- Founded: 2008; 18 years ago
- Founder: Kyle Pulley and Joe Reinhart
- Headquarters: Philadelphia, Pennsylvania
- Website: headroom.studio

Headroom Studios is a music recording studio in Clifton Heights, Pennsylvania outside Philadelphia. The studio was founded by Kyle Pulley and Joe Reinhart in 2008 in a warehouse in North Philadelphia.

Pulley and Reinhart were college classmates who were active in the Philadelphia DIY punk scene who decided to partner after graduation in order create the studio to start their careers in music. In addition to being producers, Pulley and Reinhart are active musicians playing in Thin Lips (Pulley) and Hop Along (Reinhart).

== Notable Artists ==
- Adult Mom
- Alex G
- Algernon Cadwallader
- Bad Moves
- Beach Bunny,
- Diet Cig
- The Districts
- Field Mouse
- Frances Quinlan,
- Hop Along
- Joyce Manor
- Katie Ellen
- Kississippi
- Mal Blum
- Modern Baseball
- Mt. Joy
- Prince Daddy & The Hyena
- Remo Drive
- Shamir
- Snowing
- Thin Lips
- Timeshares
- Vundabar
- The World Is a Beautiful Place & I Am No Longer Afraid to Die
