= Momentary Lapse of Happily =

Studio album by Adult Mom
- Released: July 31, 2015
- Genre: Bedroom pop; indie pop; lo-fi music
- Length: 31:36
- Language: English
- Label: Tiny Engines

Adult Mom chronology
Sometimes Bad Happens (2014)	Momentary Lapse of Happily (2015)	Soft Spots (2017)

Momentary Lapse of Happily is the debut full-length studio album by American bedroom pop act Adult Mom, released by Tiny Engines on July 31, 2015.

== Reception ==
Pitchfork Media's Sasha Geffen rated this release a 6.8 out of 10, comparing it to Xiu Xiu, but "in a lighter, warmer cadence" and writing that the listener can feel diverse emotions including the anxiety of songwriter Stevie Knipe. That outlet also published a review of the track "Survival" from this album, where Jenn Pelly favorably compares the song to Rilo Kiley and praises it for being politically conscious and "deceptively light" pop music. RENALDO69 of Punknews gave Momentary Lapse of Happily 4 out of 5 stars, for having a "vast array of sounds and influences" and strong emotional lyrics.

== Track listing ==
All songs written by Stevie Knipe.

1. "Be Your Own 3AM" – 2:12
2. "Survival" – 2:48
3. "2012" – 3:07
4. "Told Ya So" – 2:37
5. "Sorry I Was Sorry" – 2:23
6. "Sun Theory" – 1:47
7. "What's Another Lipstick Mark" – 1:58
8. "Sincerely Yours, Truly" – 2:08
9. "Laying on My Floor" – 2:04
10. "Meg Ryan" – 2:26
11. "Wake" – 2:50
12. "When You Are Happy" – 2:52
13. "Lose-Recover" – 2:23

== Personnel ==
Adult Mom

- Bruce Hamilton – guitar
- Steph Knipe – guitar, keyboards, vocals
- K. T. McManus – bass guitar
- Jen Sinski – bass guitar, drums
- Jack Tomascak – drums

Additional personnel

- Mike Dvorscak – keyboards, vocal harmony, recording, engineering, mixing
- Dave Eck – mastering
- Matt van Assalt – artwork

== See also ==
- List of 2015 albums
