= Diners (music) =

- Birth name: Blue Broderick
- Born: August 14, 1992 (age 32)
- Origin: Phoenix, Arizona, U.S.
- Genres: Indie rock, power pop
- Years active: 2012–present
- Labels: Asian Man Records, Lost Tapes Records, Phat N' Phunky Records, Lauren Records, Diet Pop Records, Snorin' Desert Tapes, Bar/None Records
- Website: diners.bandcamp.com

Diners is the stage name of guitar pop musician Blue Broderick (born August 14, 1992). They play both solo and with a full band.

== Career ==
The first Diners album titled Throw Me a Ten was released on cassette by Snorin' Desert Tapes in 2012, later issued on vinyl by Lauren Records 2016. A second album titled Always Room was released in 2014 with Lost Sound Tapes, Phat 'N' Phunky, and Diet Pop Records. In 2015, Diners released an EP titled It's All True. In 2016, Diners put out their third album titled Three via Asian Man Records, Lost Sound Tapes, and Diet Pop Records. Diners fifth album, Leisure World, was released on April 24, 2020, via Lauren Records.

== Discography ==
=== Studio albums ===
- Throw Me a Ten (2012, Snorin Desert Tapes; pressed on vinyl in 2016 by Lauren Records)
- Always Room (2014, Lost Sound Tapes, Phat 'N' Phunky, Diet Pop Records)
- Three (2016, Asian Man Records, Lost Sound Tapes, Diet Pop Records)
- A Soft Day (2017, Warped Your Records)
- Leisure World (2020, Lauren Records)
- Four Wheels and the Truth (2022, Lauren Records)
- Domino (2023, Bar/None Records)

=== EPs ===
- It's All True (2015, Phat 'N' Phunky)
- "Split" with Walter Etc. (2017, Lauren Records)
