= Timeshares (band) =

American rock band

- Origin: Downstate New York, U.S.
- Genres: Indie rock, alternative rock, punk rock
- Years active: 2009–present
- Labels: Wiretap Records; SideOneDummy Records; Dead Broke Rekerds; Kiss Of Death Records; Kind Of Like Records; All in Vinyl; Suburbia Records
- Members: Jon Hernandez; Mike Natoli; Eric Bedell; Maxwell Stern
- Past members: Jay Mosher
- Website: timeshares.bandcamp.com

Timeshares is an American rock band from Downstate New York.

== History ==
Timeshares was formed by members of the Oneonta, New York, band The Knockdown. Their first release was a self-titled demo CD in 2009. They began touring the eastern half of the United States regularly in 2010.

Kiss Of Death Records released a split 7-inch with Captain, We're Sinking on October 29, 2010, as Timeshares made their first appearance at The Fest in Gainesville, Florida.

The debut full length, Bearable was co-released by Kiss Of Death Records and Kind Of Like Records on October 25, 2011. Timeshares remained on the road in support of the album into 2012, touring with Bangers, Spraynard, Luther (Chunksaah Records) and Despite Everything.

The UK record label All in Vinyl released a split 7-inch with the Welsh band Dividers on October 19, 2012, as part of a series of splits between North American and UK bands.

Timeshares played their first international shows in 2013, appearing at Pouzza Fest in Montreal and touring Europe with the Dutch band Antillectual.

Suburbia Records released a split 7-inch with Luther on December 9, 2014, as part of a 7-inch box-set.

On February 10, 2015, Timeshares announced they had signed to SideOneDummy Records. The sophomore full length, Already Dead was released on April 28, 2015. A music video was shot and released for the song "The Bad Parts" in which puppets of the band members were set on fire. Timeshares returned to Europe in May 2015, appearing at Groezrock and co-headlining dates with Astpai. They toured the Midwestern US and Canada in August 2015 before circling the full US with Signals Midwest in October 2015.

Bearable was reissued on vinyl by Dead Broke Rekerds in 2016.

Timeshares released a digital EP called On Life Support on January 9, 2018. The release was followed by a tour with Restorations. A second digital EP called Out There was released on October 19, 2018, and followed by a tour with Iron Chic.

== Members ==
- Jon Hernandez – guitar, vocals
- Mike Natoli – bass, vocals
- Eric Bedell – drums, vocals
- Maxwell Stern – guitar, vocals

Former members

- Jay Mosher – guitar, vocals

== Discography ==
=== Studio albums ===
- Bearable (2011)
- Already Dead (2015)
- Limb (2022)

=== Extended plays ===
- On Life Support (2018)
- Out There (2018)
- In The Ground (2021)

=== Splits and Singles ===
- Split w/ Captain, We're Sinking (2010)
- Split w/ Dividers (2012)
- Split w/ Luther (2014)
- The Boot (GTFO) (2021)

=== Demos ===
- Timeshares (2009)

=== Music videos ===
- "The Bad Parts" (2015)
- "Spend The Night" (2015)
- "Siren Sound" (2022)
