= Captain, We're Sinking =

American punk band

- Origin: Scranton, Pennsylvania, US
- Genres: Punk rock, emo, indie rock
- Years active: 2006–2018, 2022–present
- Labels: Run For Cover Records, Kind of Like Records, Evil Weevil Records, Kiss Of Death Records, Lock and Key Collective
- Members: Bob Barnett; Leo Vergnetti; Ben Walsh; Bill Orender
- Past members: Mike May (2006–2008); Roberto Acosta (2009); Zack (Rug) Charette (2006-2018)
- Website: captainweresinking.tumblr.com

Captain, We're Sinking is an American punk band from Scranton, Pennsylvania. They released three full-length albums: The Animals Are Out, The Future Is Cancelled, and The King of No Man. Singer Bobby Barnett is the brother of Greg Barnett who is one of the two singers in The Menzingers. Former drummer Mike May, formerly of Tigers Jaw, is the brother of The Menzingers' second singer Tom May. Leo Vergnetti, Bobby Barnett, Greg Barnett, Mike May, and Adam McIlwee, formerly of Tigers Jaw, had membership of the former ska punk band Kos-Mos of Scranton, Pennsylvania. They announced on Facebook that they were no longer an active band on February 12, 2018.

The band has since played a limited number of shows with Ben Walsh, singer and guitarist of Tigers Jaw, playing bass.

== Members ==
- Bob Barnett – vocals, guitar
- Leo Vergnetti – vocals, guitar
- Ben Walsh – bass guitar
- Bill Orender – drums

=== Past members ===
- Mike May – drums
- Roberto Acosta – drums
- Chad Tissue - drums
- Zack (Rug) Charette - bass

== Discography ==
Albums

- The Animals Are Out (2007)
- The Future Is Cancelled (2013)
- The King of No Man (2017)

EPs and splits

- Captain, We're Sinking / Spraynard (2008)
- It's a Trap! (2009)
- Timeshares / Captain, We're Sinking (2010)
- With Joe Riley (2011)
- Dowsing / Haverford / Run Forever / Captain, We're Sinking (2013)

Compilations

- Captain, We're Sinking (2015)
