= Adult Mom =

American indie-pop band

Stevie Knipe
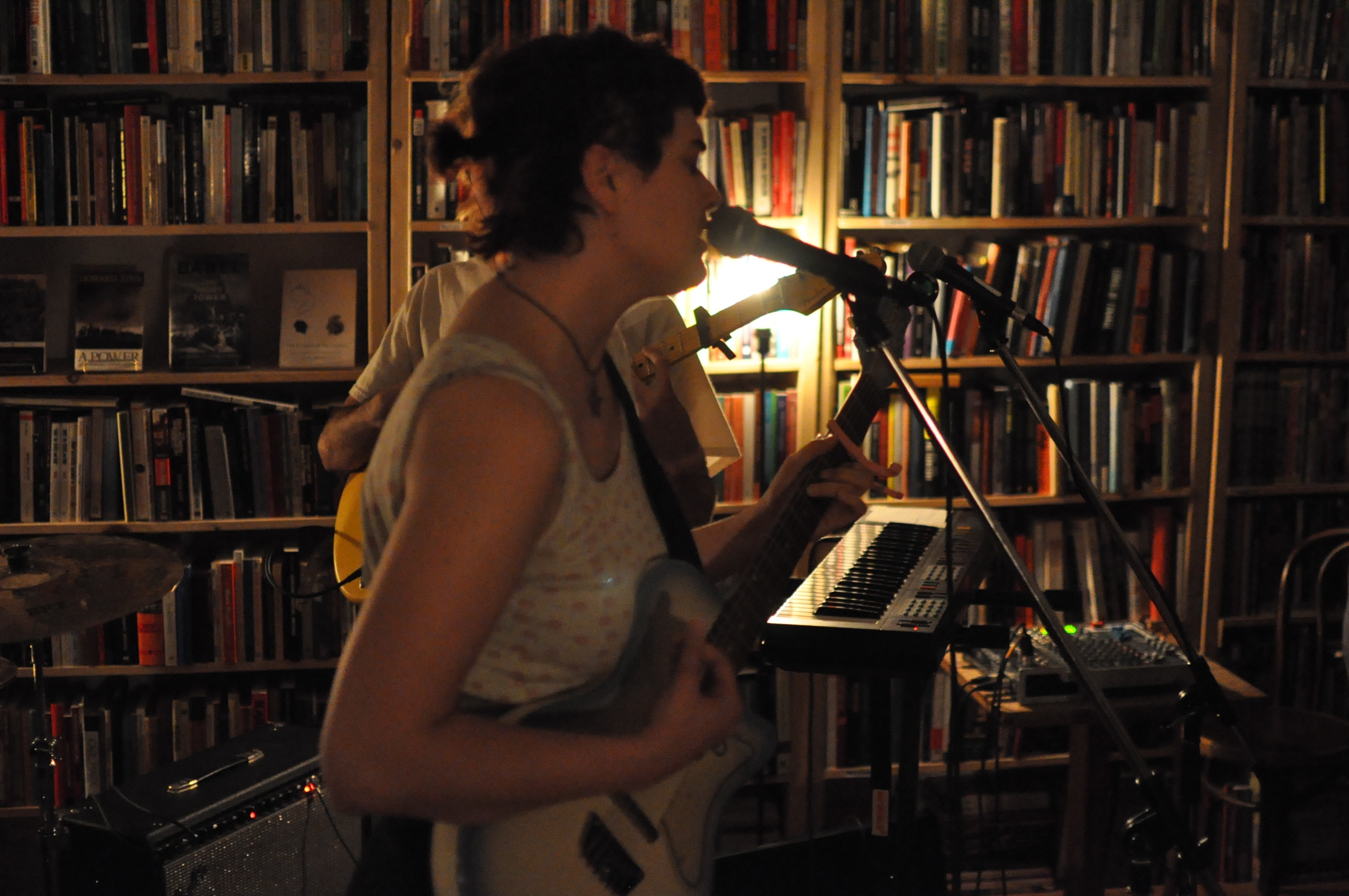

Background information
- Origin: Purchase, New York
- Genres: Bedroom pop, lo-fi, shoegaze
- Years active: 2012–present
- Labels: Tiny Engines; Epitaph Records
- Website: adultmom.bandcamp.com

Adult Mom is an indie rock band founded by musician Stevie Knipe. Initially a solo project, Adult Mom has now expanded into a full band including guitarist Allegra Eidinger, bassist Lily Mastrodimos, and drummer Olivia Battell. They have released four full-length albums and multiple EPs, most recently 2025's Natural Causes on Epitaph Records.

== History ==
Stevie Knipe started playing the guitar when they were fifteen. Adult Mom began in 2012 in Knipe's bedroom, where they recorded an EP and released on Bandcamp titled Bedroom Recordings. Knipe attended State University of New York at Purchase, where they studied anthropology and began writing music. The following year, Knipe released two EP's, one titled bstmommy and the other titled "Mom's Day".

In August 2014, Knipe released a mini-album titled i fell in love by accident. In July 2014, Knipe released another EP titled Sometimes Bad Happens. The EP was listed at number four on Rolling Stone's "10 Best Cassettes of 2014" list. Adult Mom was also part of a split alongside Cyberbully Mom Club and i tried to run away when i was 6.

In 2015, Knipe released their first album on Tiny Engines titled Momentary Lapse of Happily. Their second album with Tiny Engines, entitled Soft Spots, was released on May 19, 2017.

Six months after the release of Soft Spots, on November 9, 2019, Knipe published a series of tweets accusing Tiny Engines of withholding three years' worth of royalty payments. Tiny Engines ultimately repaid them and subsequently agreed to return the masters for both records released by the label.

Their third full-length album Driver, which was produced by Stevie Knipe and Kyle Pulley at Headroom Studios in Philadelphia, was announced for release on March 5, 2021, via Epitaph Records. It received a rating of 7.3 from Pitchfork. Also in March 2021, Adult Mom was featured in Guitar World Magazine, in which Stevie Knipe and Allegra Eidinger "discuss driving forward with intention and welcoming their pop sensibilities".

On May 9, 2025, Adult Mom released their fourth full-length album, Natural Causes, again via Epitaph Records.

== Musical style ==
Adult Mom's music has been characterized as "intimate, self-conscious indie pop," drawing comparisons to Frankie Cosmos. Themes explored in the band's lyrics include early adulthood.

Frontperson Stevie Knipe's cancer treatment, changing sexuality, and the isolation of COVID pandemic lockdowns informed the writing of Natural Causes.

Knipe cites Alanis Morissette, The Cranberries, Rilo Kiley, and Bright Eyes as musical influences. Their early musical interests also include The Jonas Brothers, Britney Spears, and The Spice Girls.

== Personal life ==
Knipe is genderqueer and uses they/them pronouns.

Knipe was diagnosed with breast cancer in 2021, and they underwent treatment that included a double mastectomy.

== Band members ==
- Stevie Knipe – songwriting, guitar, vocals
- Olivia Battell – drums
- Allegra Eidinger – lead guitar

== Discography ==
Albums

- Momentary Lapse of Happily (2015, Tiny Engines)
- Soft Spots (2017, Tiny Engines)
- Driver (2021, Epitaph)
- Natural Causes (2025, Epitaph)

EPs

- bedroom recordings (2012)
- i fell in love by accident (2013)
- bstmommy (2013)
- mom's day (2013)
- Sometimes Bad Happens (2014)

== See also ==
- LGBT culture in New York City
- List of LGBT people from New York City
- NYC Pride March
