= You're Not As As You Think =

You're Not As _____ As You Think

Studio album by Sorority Noise
- Released: March 17, 2017
- Studio: The Barber Shop, Hopatcong, New Jersey
- Genre: Emo; indie rock; pop punk; post-hardcore
- Length: 29:38
- Label: Triple Crown Records
- Producer: Mike Sapone

Sorority Noise chronology
Joy, Departed (2015)	You're Not As _____ As You Think (2017)	YNAAYT (2018)

You're Not As _____ As You Think is the third and final studio album by American emo band Sorority Noise. Produced by Mike Sapone, the album was released on March 17, 2017, through Triple Crown Records. The album is available to purchase on Bandcamp.

== Background ==
You're Not As _____ As You Think contains more reflective lyricism than Sorority Noise's previous efforts. The band described the album as an "emotional bulldozer". The main lyrical themes include depression and death of close friends. You're Not As _____ As You Think has been described as emo, indie rock, pop punk and alternative rock.

== Reception ==
Professional ratings
Aggregate scores
Source	Rating
Metacritic	81/100
Review scores
Source	Rating
AllMusic	3.5/5 stars
DIY	4/5 stars
Pitchfork	8.0/10
Rock Sound	6/10
Rolling Stone Australia	3.5/5 stars

You're Not As _____ As You Think received acclaim from music critics. At Metacritic, which assigns a normalized rating out of 100 to reviews from mainstream critics, the album has received an average score of 81, based on thirteen reviews, indicating "universal acclaim". Pitchfork gave it an 8/10, saying, "Sorority Noise know brutal honesty can be uncomfortable, but they employ it so well on their latest album, a rafter-reaching emo record about the raw stages of grief and loneliness." Rock Sound stated that the album is "Melancholy at its finest." Jessica Goodman from DIY praised "A Portrait Of" saying "Giving voice to anxieties and doubts only to shatter through them with a screaming crescendo of steadfast resolve, this is the sound of Sorority Noise at their strongest."

=== Accolades ===
Publication	Accolade	Rank	Ref.
Stereogum	The 50 Best Albums of 2017	16	
Vinyl Me, Please	The 30 Best Albums of 2017	24	

== Track listing ==
No.	Title	Length
1.	"No Halo"	2:50
2.	"A Portrait Of"	3:30
3.	"First Letter from St. Sean"	3:06
4.	"A Better Sun"	3:16
5.	"Disappeared"	2:50
6.	"Car"	2:05
7.	"Where Are You?"	3:00
8.	"Second Letter from St. Julien"	3:26
9.	"Leave the Fan On"	4:44
10.	"New Room"	1:56
Total length:		29:38

== Personnel ==
- Cameron Boucher – vocals, rhythm guitar
- Ryan McKenna – bass, vocals
- Adam Ackerman – lead guitar, keys, vocals
- Charlie Singer – drums

== Charts ==
Chart (2017)	Peak position
US Billboard 200	176
