= Everyone Everywhere =

Rock band from Philadelphia, U.S.

- Origin: Philadelphia, Pennsylvania, U.S.
- Genres: Emo, indie rock
- Years active: 2007–present
- Labels: Evil Weevil, Topshelf, Tiny Engines
- Members: Brendan McHugh; Tommy Manson; Matt Scottoline; Brendan Graham
- Past members: Chris Palmer; Luke Darigan

Everyone Everywhere is an American emo band from Philadelphia, Pennsylvania.

== History ==
Everyone Everywhere formed in 2007. They have released two self-titled albums, two EPs, and one split with Into It. Over It. since then.

== Personnel ==
- Brendan McHugh – guitar, vocals
- Brendan Graham – drums
- Matt Scottoline – bass
- Tommy Manson – guitar

== Discography ==
Studio albums

- Everyone Everywhere (2010)
- Everyone Everywhere (2012)

EPs

- Pants (2007)
- A Lot Of Weird People Standing Around (2008)

Splits

- Into It. Over It. / Everyone Everywhere (2010)

Compilations

- Everyone Everywhere (2021)
