= Old Gray =

American emo band

- Origin: Hooksett, New Hampshire and Auburn, New Hampshire
- Genres: Screamo; emo; post-hardcore
- Years active: 2011-2018
- Labels: Flower Girl Records, It's a Trap Records, Sea of Tranquility Records, Songs from the Road Records, Broken World Media, Dog Knights Productions, Soft Speak Records
- Past members: Zane McDaniel; Raphael Bastek; Cameron Boucher; Charlie Singer; Adam Ackerman
- Website: oldgray.bandcamp.com

Old Gray was an American emo band from Hooksett and Auburn, New Hampshire.

== History ==
Old Gray began in 2011. The band was formed by Cameron Boucher, Charlie Singer, Zane McDaniel, and Raphael Bastek. In 2013, Boucher would form punk band Sorority Noise in which would later feature Singer. Due to the prominent rise in popularity of Sorority Noise, Old Gray would often have to take long periods of inactivity aside for some one-off shows. Since then, they have released two full-length albums, three EPs, six splits, and two singles. Their debut album, An Autobiography, was released in 2013. Their second full-length album, Slow Burn was released on December 9, 2016 via Boucher's Flower Girl Records.

In April 2018, the band announced their final shows but cancelled them due to the Boucher's mental health, after a third party claimed Boucher had sexually assaulted a friend of theirs. In December 2018, these claims were refuted in a joint post by both Boucher and the person involved, saying that "they were pressured into making this statement" and that "anything that did occur was not purposeful or malicious."

== Members ==
Final line-up

- Cameron Boucher - guitar, vocals, bass, and piano (2011–2018)
- Charlie Singer - drums and spoken word (2011–2018)
- Adam Ackerman - bass and vocals (2015–2018)

Past

- Raphael Bastek - guitar, vocals, bass, and drums (2011-2014)
- Zane McDaniel - bass (2011)

Timeline

== Discography ==
=== Studio albums ===
- An Autobiography (2013)
- Slow Burn (2016)

=== EPs ===
- Demo (2011)
- Do I Dare Disturb The Universe (2011)
- Everything I Let Go & The Things I Refuse To (2012)
- Dex (2015)

=== Splits ===
- Old Gray & The Hundred Acre Woods - An Acoustic Split Among Friends (2011)
- Old Gray / Girl Scouts (2011)
- 4-way V-Day split - The Hundred Acre Woods / Julia Brown / Modern Baseball / Old Gray (2013)
- Old Gray / Tiny Moving Parts / Have Mercy / Unraveler (2013)
- Dikembe / The Hotel Year / Modern Baseball / Old Gray / Empire! Empire! (I Was a Lonely Estate) / Pentimento (2013)
- Old Gray / Tiny Moving Parts (2014)

=== Singles ===
- ""I Think I Might Love You" Is An Awfully Long Sentence" (2013)
- "The Artist" (2013)
- "Catharsis" (2011 demo) (2013)
