= Driver (Adult Mom album) =

Studio album by Adult Mom
- Released: March 5, 2021
- Studio: Headroom, Philadelphia, Pennsylvania, United States
- Genre: Bedroom pop
- Length: 30:05
- Language: English
- Label: Epitaph
- Producer: Stevie Knipe; Kyle Pulley

Adult Mom chronology
Some Covers (2019)	Driver (2021)	Driver (Live from Headroom Studios) (2021)

Driver is the third full-length studio album by American bedroom pop act Adult Mom, released by Epitaph Records on March 5, 2021.

== Reception ==
Driver received positive reviews from critics noted at review aggregator Metacritic. It has a weighted average score of 80 out of 100, based on four reviews. Writing for Pitchfork, Sophia June gave this album a 7.3 out of 10 for "layered arrangements and a renewed sense of confidence" with "lyrics so honest they border on awkward" and "a knack for storytelling that feels real". In Rolling Stone, Jon Dolan scored Driver 4 out of 5 stars, calling it "a coming-of-age indie pop masterpiece... with bright production and songs that carefully and vividly map out an early-twenties travelogue full of crisis, memory, hope, and the kind of intense moments that feel almost debilitatingly hard-hitting at that age".

== Track listing ==
All songs written by Stevie Knipe.

1. "Passenger" – 3:16
2. "Wisconsin" – 2:50
3. "Breathing" – 3:14
4. "Berlin" – 3:20
5. "Sober" – 2:57
6. "Dancing" – 3:07
7. "Adam" – 1:48
8. "Regret It" – 4:17
9. "Checking Up" – 2:37
10. "Frost" – 2:39

== Personnel ==
Adult Mom

- Olivia Battell – drums, percussion
- Allegra Eidinger – lead guitar
- Stevie Knipe – rhythm guitar, keyboards, vocals, production

Additional personnel

- Johanna Baumann – assistant engineering
- Hank Byerly – assistant engineering
- Nick “Scoops” Dardaris – engineering
- Erik Freedman – assistant engineering
- Zena Kay – pedal steel guitar on “Passenger” "Regret It" and “Frost”
- Kylie Lotz – backing vocals on “Passenger”
- Alex Melendez – assistant engineering
- Jackie Milestone – engineering
- Ava Mirzadegan – backing vocals on “Adam”
- Danny Murillo – engineering
- Kyle Pulley – bass guitar, chorus guitar on “Sober”, engineering, mixing, production
- Ryan Schwabe – mastering
- Luke Volkert – synthesizer arpeggio on “Sober”, Roland TR-808 programming on “Sober”
- Emma Witmer – backing vocals on "Frost" and “Wisconsin”
- Clara Zornado – backing vocals on "Regret It"

== See also ==
- List of 2021 albums
