= Trace Mountains =

American indie rock musician

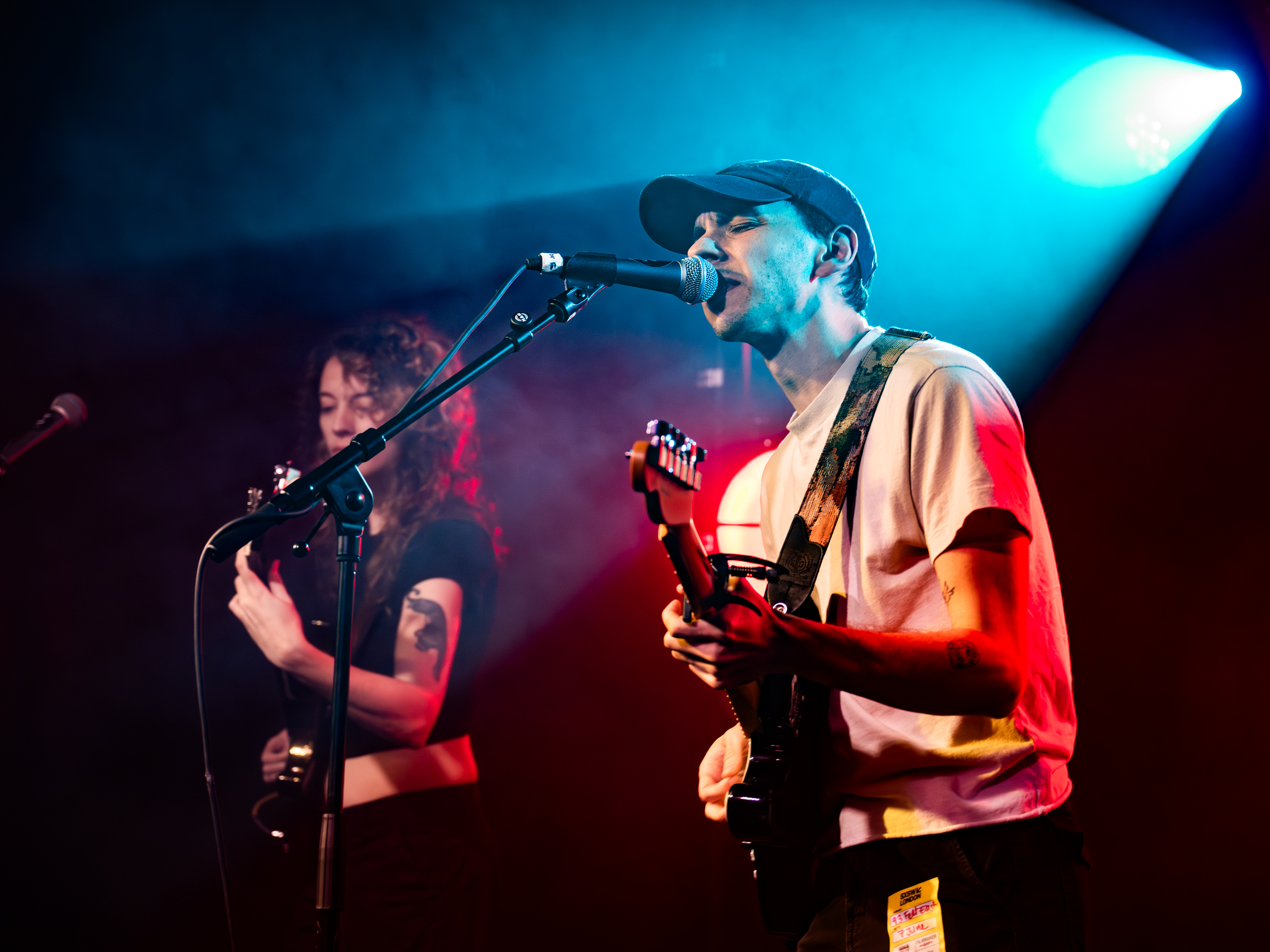
- At SXSW London, June 2025

Background information
- Born: Dave Benton
- Genre: Indie rock
- Occupation: Musician
- Years active: 2016–present

Trace Mountains is the musical project of American indie rock musician Dave Benton. Benton was formerly the lead singer of lo-fi band LVL UP.

== History ==
In 2016, Benton released a collection of songs titled Buttery Sprouts & Other Songs, his first release under the moniker Trace Mountains. Benton released his first full-length album as Trace Mountains in 2018 titled A Partner to Lean On. In 2020, Benton released his second album as Trace Mountains titled Lost in the Country. Benton released his third full-length album as Trace Mountains, House of Confusion, on October 22, 2021.

== Discography ==
Studio albums

- A Partner to Lean On (2018)
- Lost in the Country (2020)
- House of Confusion (2021)
- Into the Burning Blue (2024)
