= Infinity Crush =

American bedroom pop band

Infinity Crush is an American bedroom pop band from Raleigh, North Carolina.

== History ==
Infinity Crush started as the solo project of musician Caroline White in 2013. In that year, White released a number of extended plays, including Stumble Pretty and Sometimes Even In My Dreams I Am. White released her debut album as Infinity Crush in 2016 titled Warmth Equation. White released her second full-length album as Infinity Crush on August 9, 2019.
