= Thin Lips =

American indie rock band

- Origin: Philadelphia, Pennsylvania, United States
- Genres: Indie rock; Pop Punk
- Labels: Lame-O Records; Big Scary Monsters
- Members: Chrissy Tashjian; Mikey Tashjian; Kyle Pulley
- Past members: Chris Diehm

Thin Lips are an American indie rock band from Philadelphia, Pennsylvania.

== History ==
Thin Lips released their debut full-length album in 2016 titled Riff Hard, named for Chrissy Tashjian's knuckle tattoos that feature on the cover, on Lame-O Records. In 2017, Thin Lips released a split EP with Modern Baseball and The Superweaks. In 2018, Thin Lips released their second full-length album titled Chosen Family. Members Chrissy Tashjian and Kyle Pulley self-produce their albums at Headroom Studios, which Pulley is a co-owner of.
