= Somos (band) =

American rock band

- Genres: Indie rock; emo; pop punk; post-punk; dream pop
- Years active: 2012–2016, 2017–2019, 2025–present
- Labels: Tiny Engines; No Sleep; Hopeless
- Members: Michael Fiorentino; Justin Hahn
- Past members: Evan Deges; Phil Haggerty

Somos is an American rock band from Boston, Massachusetts.

== History ==
Somos began in July 2012 when they self-released a demo titled Demo 2012.

On March 25, 2014, Somos released their first full-length album titled Temple of Plenty via Tiny Engines. On November 4, 2014, Somos released a split with fellow emo band Sorority Noise via Bad Timing Records.

On February 24, 2015, Somos and Have Mercy released a split via No Sleep Records. On November 30, 2015, Somos announced they have signed to Hopeless Records with plans to release their sophomore full-length album sometime in 2016. Their second album, First Day Back was released on February 19, 2016. The band toured in support of the album, with what would end up being their final live show to date taking place on September 23, 2016 in Toronto.

On December 29, 2016, Somos announced via their Instagram that they would be taking an indefinite break but promised fans that it was not a permanent end to the band.

On August 22, 2017, Somos returned with the release of single "Strangers On the Train". The following year, the band shared on social media that they had begun writing a new album; its completion was confirmed by the band in January 2019 after posting a photo with producer Jay Maas (formerly of Defeater) in the studio. On August 10, 2019, it was announced that founding band member Phil Haggerty had died. In spite of this, Somos continued on with the release of their third album Prison On A Hill later that month on August 30, 2019. The album was released on Tiny Engines Records and reached #18 on the alternative Billboard music charts. The band entered a hiatus following the album's release.

In 2025, the band announced their reunion. Jay Maas was enlisted as a touring guitarist to play Haggerty's parts. The band played a run of shows in September 2025, and played Nice, A Fest in July 2026.

== Band members ==
Current members

- Michael Fiorentino – lead vocals, bass (2012–2016, 2017–2019, 2025–present)
- Justin Hahn – guitar (2012–2016, 2017–2019, 2025–present)

Former members

- Evan Deges – drums (2012–2016, 2017–2018)
- Phil Haggerty – guitar, backing vocals, synthesizer (2012–2016, 2017–2019; died 2019)

== Discography ==
Studio albums

- Temple of Plenty (2014, Tiny Engines)
- First Day Back (2016, Hopeless Records)
- Prison On a Hill (2019, Tiny Engines)

Splits

- Somos/Sorority Noise (2014, Bad Timing Records)
- Somos/Have Mercy (2015, No Sleep Records)

Demos

- Demo 2012 (2012, self-released)
