= Sports (Modern Baseball album) =

Studio album by Modern Baseball
- Released: November 27, 2012
- Studio: Drexel University (Philadelphia, Pennsylvania)
- Genre: Emo; pop punk; Folk punk
- Length: 30:48
- Label: Lame-O
- Producer: Ian Farmer; Modern Baseball

Modern Baseball chronology
| Couples Therapy (2012) | Sports (2012) | You're Gonna Miss It All (2014) |

Singles from Sports
- 1. "The Weekend" Released: August 20, 2012

Professional ratings
Review scores
| Source | Rating |
|---|---|
| Absolute Punk | 9.2/10 stars |
| Punknews.org | 3.5/5 stars |

Sports is the debut studio album by American emo band Modern Baseball released on November 27, 2012.

== Background ==
Sports was written while the band members were attending college. Bassist Ian Farmer (who had not yet joined the band) and guitarist Jake Ewald were studying audio engineering at Drexel University and were able to record the album for free as their "first real project". The band outsourced the album to have it mixed due to their lack of comfort or experience in that stage of the production process. The band had previously released the split EP Couples Therapy with fellow Philadelphia-based emo band Marietta and embarked on a short tour during the summer of 2012. Farmer later joined the band himself. Looking back on recording, Ewald said "it was mostly our singer Bren doing most of the legwork 'cos we didn't have a real band yet".

== Release ==
Sports was later released by Lame-O Records in December 2012. On June 22, 2013, a music video was released for "The Weekend". In June and July, the group went on a short US tour with Mixtapes, You Blew It! and Light Years. Later in July, the group appeared at I Got Brains Fest. In November, the group appeared at The Fest.

== Track listing ==
All tracks are written by Bren Lukens and Jake Ewald.

| No. | Title | Lead vocals | Length |
|---|---|---|---|
| 1. | "Re-Do" | Bren Lukens | 2:11 |
| 2. | "Tears Over Beers" | Jake Ewald | 2:48 |
| 3. | "The Weekend" | Lukens | 3:30 |
| 4. | "@chl03k" | Lukens | 1:40 |
| 5. | "Hours Outside in the Snow" | Lukens | 3:30 |
| 6. | "I Think You Were in My Profile Picture Once" | Lukens | 1:19 |
| 7. | "Re-Done" | Lukens | 4:32 |
| 8. | "Cooke" | Ewald | 3:45 |
| 9. | "See Ya, Sucker" | Lukens | 2:12 |
| 10. | "Look Out" | Lukens | 0:55 |
| 11. | "Play Ball!" | Lukens | 2:15 |
| 12. | "Coals" | Ewald | 2:11 |
| Total length: | | | 30:48 |

== Personnel ==
=== Modern Baseball ===
- Jake Ewald – vocals, guitars, drums
- Bren Lukens – vocals, guitars
- Ian Farmer - bass guitar

=== Additional musicians ===
- Adrianne Gold – vocals (tracks: 6, 11)
- Corey Rader – upright bass (track 4)

=== Production ===
- Ian Farmer – engineer, producer
- Ralph Nicastro – mixing
- Zakk Cervini – mastering
