= Slaughter Beach (band) =

Indie pop band

- Origin: Odense, Denmark
- Genres: Indie pop, Lo-fi, Indie, Pop music
- Years active: 2013–present
- Labels: New Vehicle
- Members: Nikolaj Westi; Mads Emil Aagaard; Hasse Mydtskov

Slaughter Beach is an Indie pop band, formed in Odense, Denmark. The band comprises Nikolaj Westi, Mads Emil Aagaard and Hasse Mydtskov.

== History ==
The band released their first tracks "Made-Up True Love" and "Spinning Globe" in 2013, via their SoundCloud page. In 2015 their track "Nuked" appeared and later that year their debut-EP "Love/Venice" was released. In 2016 they premiered the tracks "Glaze", and "Shere Khan", which are to be a part of their new EP "Heroic Dose". In September, 2016 their single "The Mo" was released.

In April of 2024, the band released their first single in eight years with "BFF", which the band announced on their social media platform. That year Slaughter Beach released three further singles "Serenity", "Big Promotion", and "Prep" all leading up to the release of their third EP called "EP", released October 2024 on New Vehicle.

== Musical style and influences ==
Slaughter Beach's music has been described as a mixture between Lo-fi, Indie and Pop music. According to indie music and rap blog Pigeons and Planes "Slaughter Beach draws on rock influences like Beach House, Girls (band), MGMT, and The Strokes to create a sound that expands upon today’s prevailing sounds and brings a little grunginess back into the fold".
