= Mo Troper =

American musician

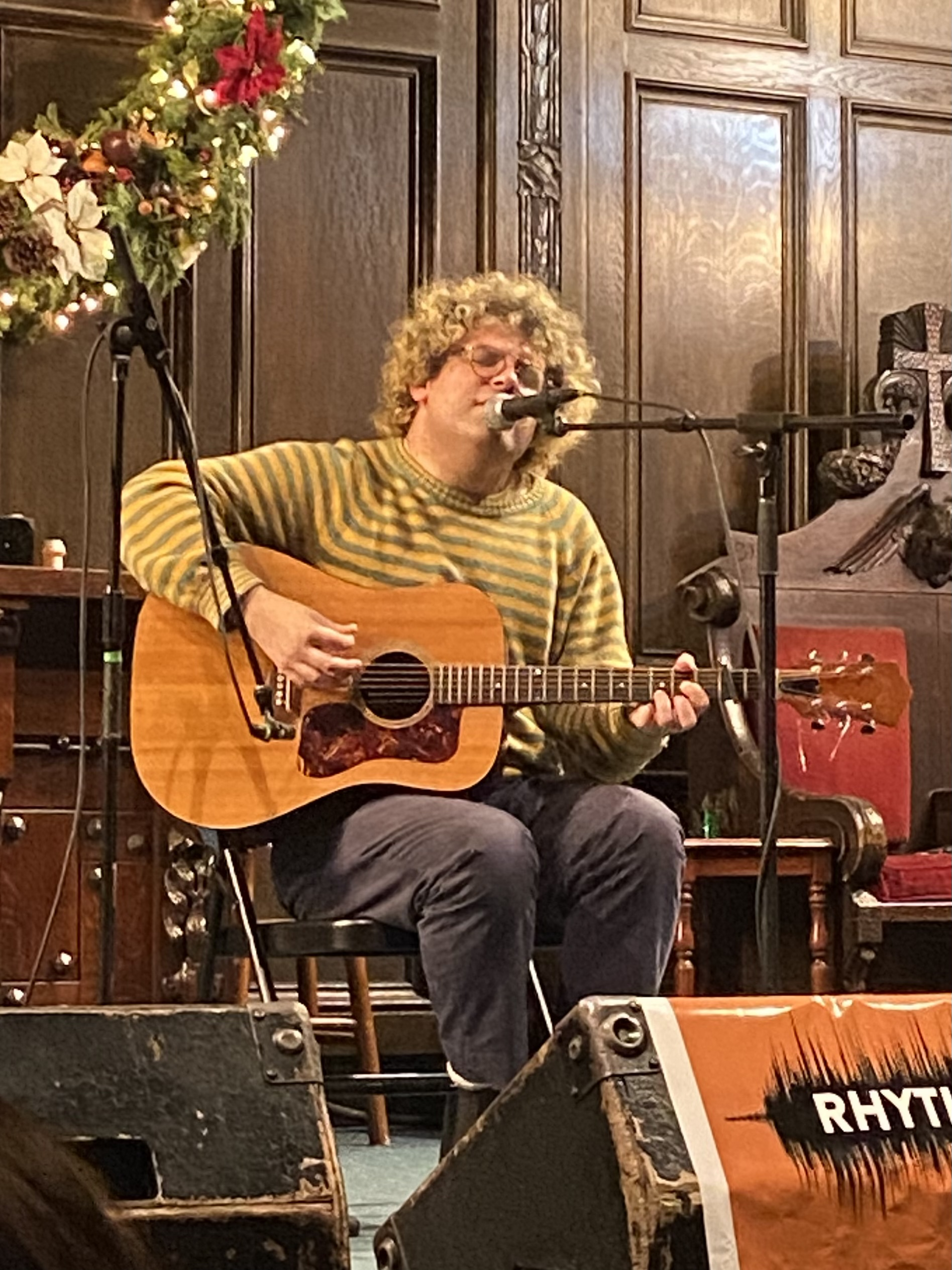
- Mo Troper performing at First Unitarian Church of Philadelphia in 2022

Background information
- Origin: Portland, Oregon, United States
- Genres: Power pop; orchestral pop; jangle pop; DIY
- Instruments: Vocals; guitar; bass; keys; drums
- Years active: 2010s–present
- Labels: Good Cheer; Lame-O; Day to Day
- Formerly of: Your Rival; Sancho

Mo Troper is an American power pop musician from Portland, Oregon.

Troper played in the bands Your Rival and Sancho in the early 2010s and released his debut album Beloved in 2016 through the record label Good Cheer. In 2017, Troper followed up that release with his second full-length album titled Exposure & Response. The album was named "Album of the day" by Bandcamp upon release. In February 2020, Troper released his third full-length album, Natural Beauty. Troper embarked on a tour in promotion of the album, but it was cancelled halfway through due to the COVID-19 pandemic. Troper contributed to the benefit compilation The Song Is Coming From Inside the House, organized by Strange Ranger to raise funds for marginalized communities during the pandemic. In 2021, Troper released an album where he covered the entire Beatles album Revolver. Troper's fourth full-length album, Dilettante, was released in 2021. Troper's fifth full-length album, MTV, was released in 2022 on Lame-O Records. In 2023, Troper released a cover album of unreleased Jon Brion songs, titled Troper Sings Brion.

In March 2024, Troper's ex-partner Maya Stoner publicly alleged that he had been physically and psychologically abusive. Troper was subsequently dropped by his management and publicity team, and Lame-O announced that they would no longer be releasing his upcoming album Svengali. Troper denied the allegations, released the album on his own label Day to Day Records, and sued Stoner for defamation. The lawsuit was settled in October of that year, with Stoner formally retracting the allegations via an affidavit and agreeing to a no-contact order. In June 2025, Spin magazine released an article titled "The Character Assassination of Mo Troper" detailing Stoner's "false and recanted" allegations, the reactions to them, and the toll taken on Troper's mental health.

== Discography ==
=== Albums ===
- Beloved (2016, Good Cheer Records)
- Exposure & Response (2017, Good Cheer Records)
- Natural Beauty (2020, Tender Loving Empire)
- Revolver (2021, Self-Released)
- Dilettante (2021, Self-Released)
- MTV (2022, Lame-O-Records / 2025, Day to Day Records)
- Troper Sings Brion (2023, Self-Released)
- Svengali (2024, Day to Day Records)

=== Compilations ===
- Gold! (2018, Good Cheer Records)

=== Live ===
- AGL Presents: Mo Troper [6.2.18] (2018, The Alternative)
