= Jake Ewald =

American musician (born 1993)

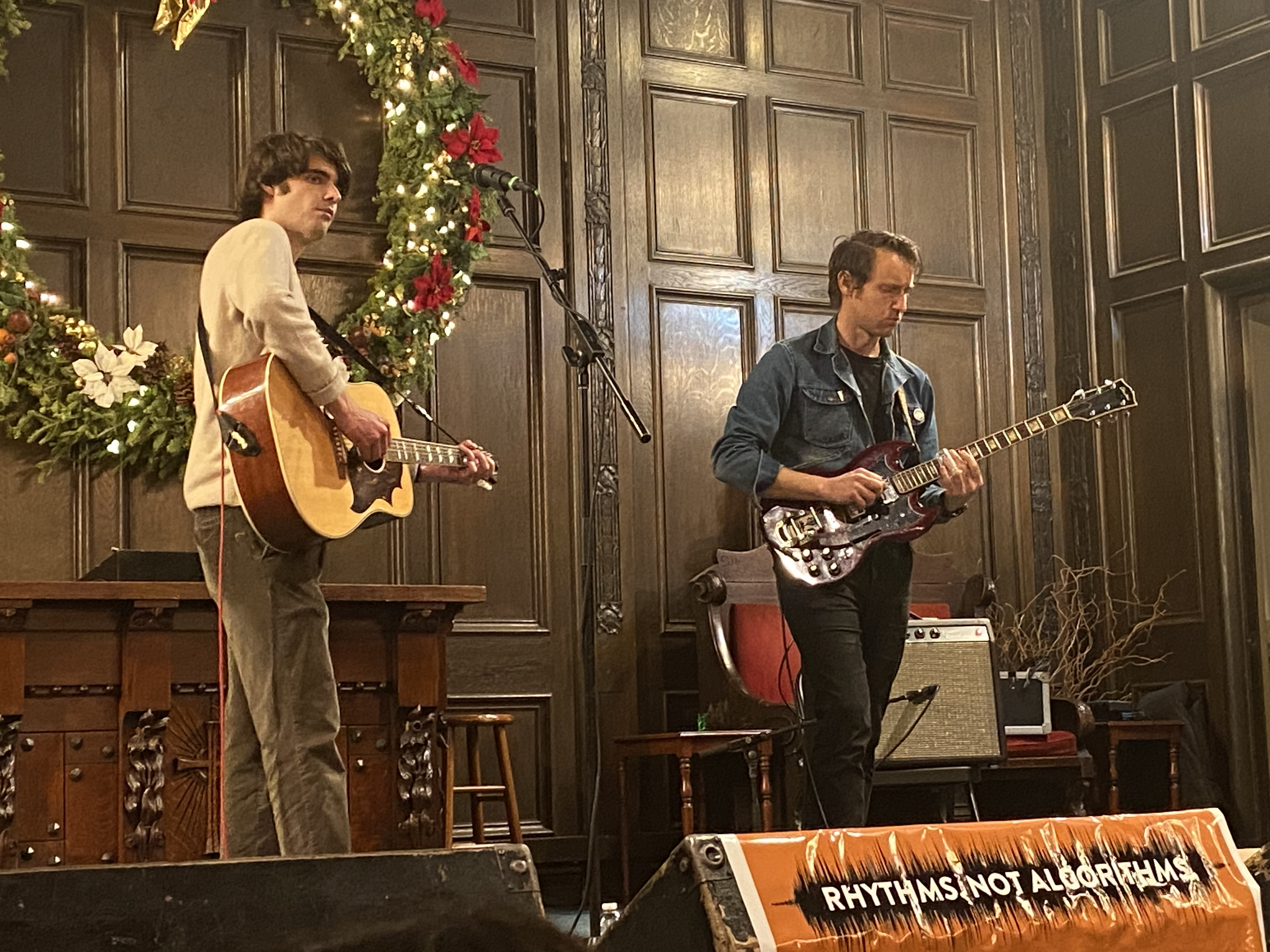
- Ewald (left) performing as Slaughter Beach, Dog in 2022

Background information
- Born: Jacob Starnes Ewald; February 28, 1993 (age 32)
- Origin: Frederick, Maryland, U.S.
- Genres: indie rock; folk rock; alternative rock; emo
- Occupations: Singer; musician; songwriter; producer
- Instruments: Vocals; guitar
- Years active: 2011–present
- Member of: Slaughter Beach, Dog
- Formerly of: Modern Baseball

Jacob Starnes Ewald (born February 28, 1993) is an American musician. He is best known as a founding member, co-lead vocalist, and guitarist of the emo band Modern Baseball. He is also the lead vocalist and guitarist of the folk-rock band Slaughter Beach, Dog, a solo project he began while still active in Modern Baseball. In addition to his performance work, Ewald has contributed to various recordings as a producer and audio engineer.

== Music career ==
=== Modern Baseball ===
Ewald, along with Bren Lukens, co-founded the band Modern Baseball in 2011. The duo were encouraged to start writing music together by Ewald's twin sister. Together they had released The Nameless Ranger that same year. In 2012, Lukens and Ewald began recording their debut album. There, they had met Ian Farmer, who produced the album. Both Farmer, and friend of the band Sean Huber, would join the band. Sports released in late 2012 on Lame-O Records.

In 2014, the band would released their second album You're Gonna Miss It All on Run For Cover Records, reaching No. 97 on the Billboard 200. In 2016, the band released their third and final studio album Holy Ghost, reaching No. 53 on the Billboard 200.

The band played their last three consecutive shows in Philadelphia. Ewald announced in an interview that they had no plans for any future shows in the foreseeable future.

=== Slaughter Beach, Dog ===
Ewald started Slaughter Beach, Dog as a solo project after experiencing writer's block. Ewald self-recorded and self-released the project's debut EP Dawg in 2014. in 2016, Ewald released the project's debut album Welcome.

In 2017, shortly after Modern Baseball went on hiatus, the band released their second studio album, Birdie. In 2019, the band had released their third studio album Safe And Also No Fear. On December 24, 2020 the band released their fourth studio album At The Moonbase. The album was written and recorded during the COVID-19 quarantine by Ewald. The band released Crying, Laughing, Waving, Smiling, their fifth studio album, on September 22, 2023.

== Discography ==
With Modern Baseball

- Sports (2012)
- You're Gonna Miss It All (2014)
- Holy Ghost (2016)

With Slaughter Beach, Dog

- Welcome (2016)
- Birdie (2017)
- Safe and Also No Fear (2019)
- At the Moonbase (2020)
- Crying, Laughing, Waving, Smiling (2023)
