= Sorority Noise =

American emo band

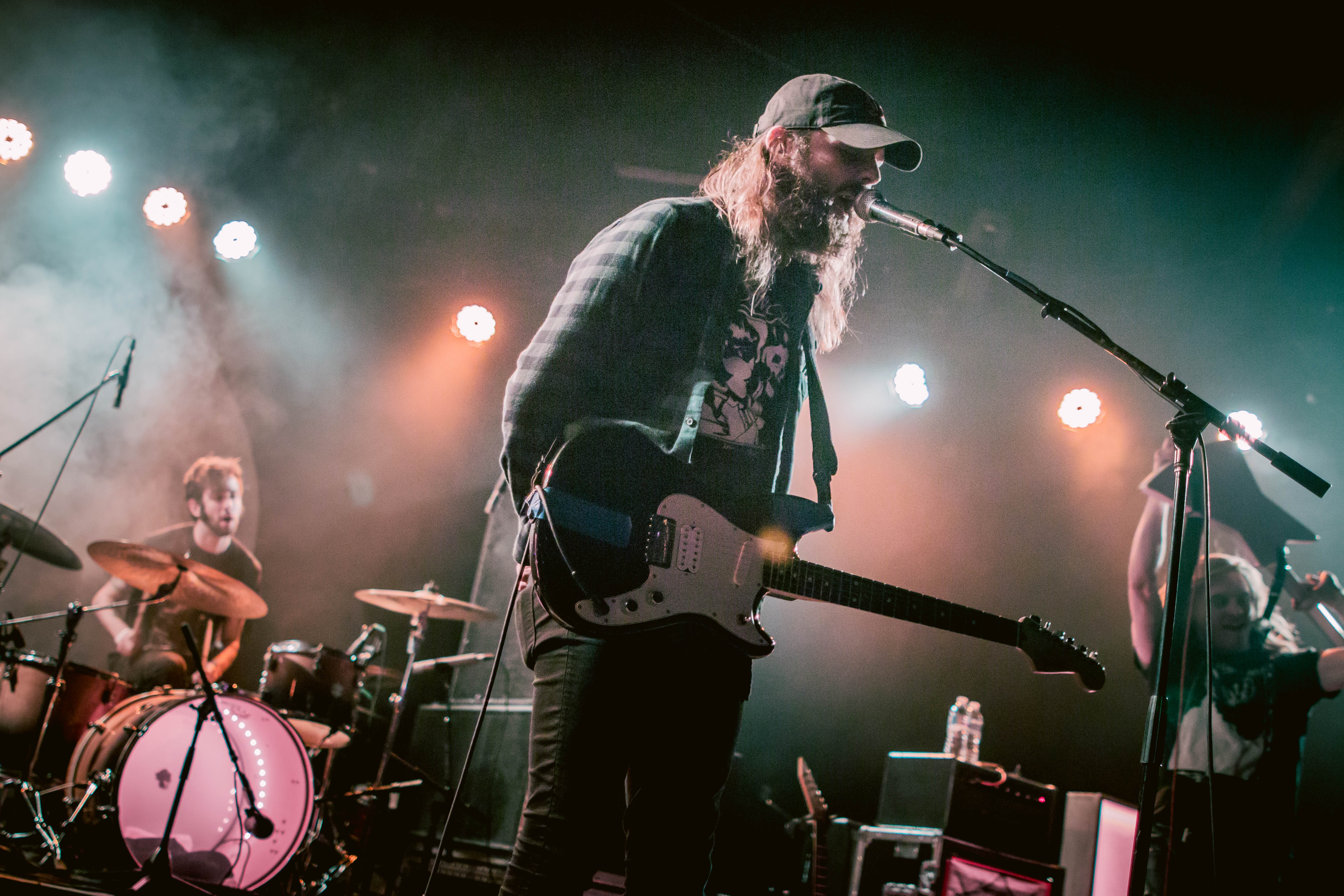
- Sorority Noise performing at The Glasshouse in November 2017

Background information
- Origin: Hartford, Connecticut
- Genres: Emo; indie rock; pop punk; post-hardcore
- Years active: 2013–2018 (indefinite hiatus)
- Labels: Topshelf; Triple Crown; Big Scary Monsters
- Members: Cameron Boucher; Adam Ackerman; Charlie Singer; Ryan McKenna
- Past members: John Rule 3; Kevin O'Donnell

Sorority Noise was an American emo band from Hartford, Connecticut. The band consisted of members from the bands Old Gray (Boucher and Singer, and Ackerman), Prawn (McKenna), Small Circle (Boucher, Singer, and Ackerman), and En Route (Singer).

On March 2, 2018, Sorority Noise announced that they would enter hiatus following the conclusion of their Spring 2018 tour.

== History ==
=== Formation and beginnings (2013–2016) ===
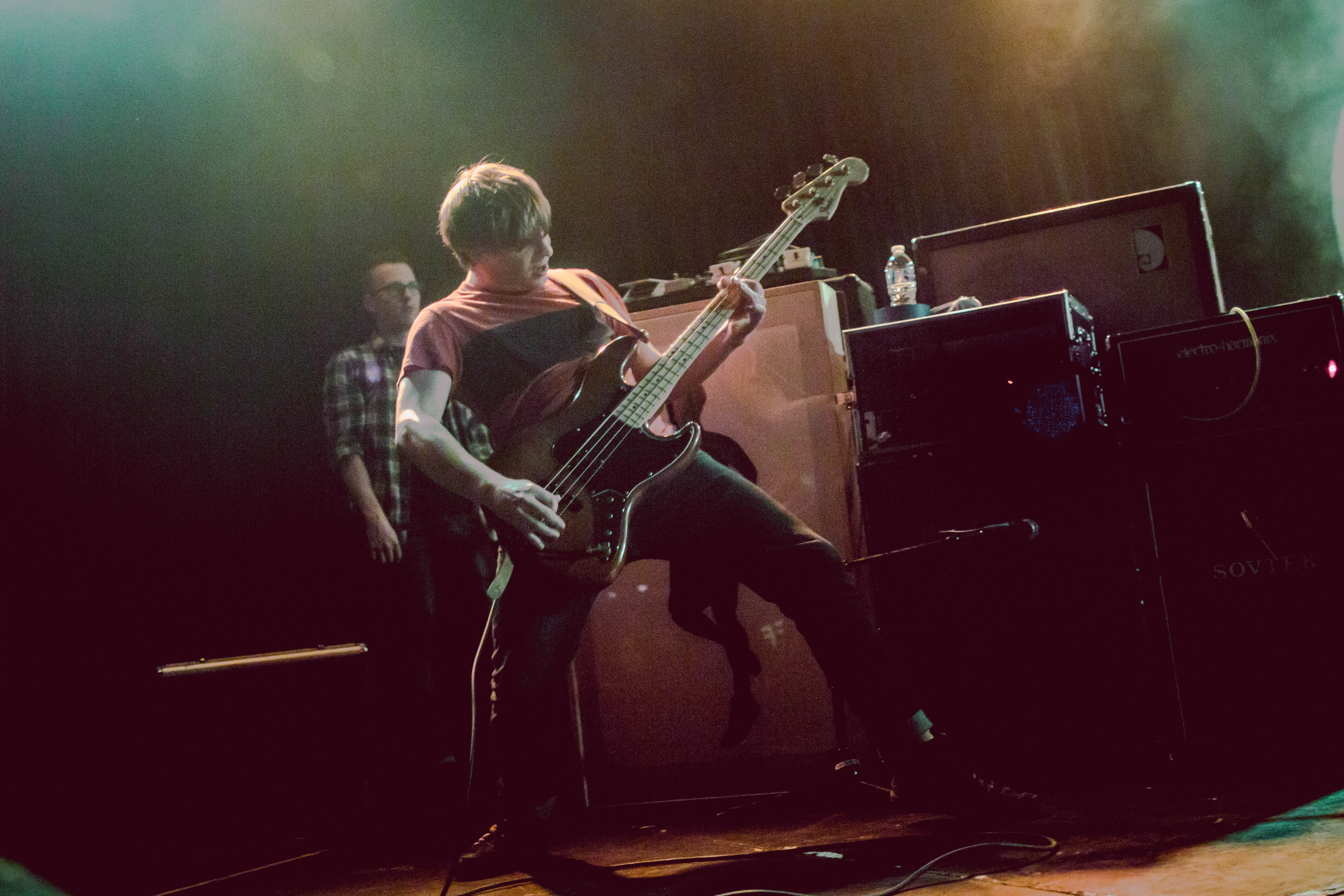
Ryan McKenna, Bass Player for Sorority Noise @ Glasshouse 2017

Sorority Noise was formed in 2013 by vocalist Cameron Boucher of the screamo band Old Gray. Joined by Old Gray drummer Charlie Singer, Prawn bassist Ryan McKenna, and second guitarist Adam Ackerman, the band formed in Hartford, Connecticut. They released their first cassette, titled Young Luck, in 2013 via Broken World Media. In May 2014, the band released their debut album, titled Forgettable, via Dog Knights Productions and Broken World Media.

In March 2014, the band supported three dates of McKenna's other band Prawn's headlining tour alongside Old Gray. In June 2014, the band supported Modern Baseball on their US headlining tour alongside Tiny Moving Parts, The Hotelier, and Old Gray on select dates. In October 2014, the band played a small string of co-headlining dates on the East Coast with the band Pinegrove. In November 2014, the band released a split extended play with Somos.

In February 2015, Sorority Noise opened for You Blew It! on select shows, and in the spring, they supported the band Hostage Calm at their final show in Wallingford, Connecticut as well as the band Fireworks on their final tour before their hiatus. Their sophomore album Joy, Departed was released on June 16, 2015 via Topshelf Records. In the summer of 2015, Sorority Noise opened for Motion City Soundtrack during their Commit This to Memory 10-year anniversary tour. They would also open for several other bands including Knuckle Puck and Modern Baseball. Alternative Press named them as one of the "100 Bands You Need to Know in 2015".

Sorority Noise released an EP titled It Kindly Stopped For Me on April 22, 2016. The EP was announced during a Nottingham show and promoted with the song "Either Way". In support of the EP, they opened for Citizen and Bayside. In October 2016, they released a split single with The World Is A Beautiful Place & I Am No Longer Afraid To Die titled "Leaf Ellis/Smoke & Felt" via Triple Crown Records. Later that month, Boucher announced his own independent record label, Flower Girl. The label re-released Sorority Noise's debut Forgettable. The band embarked on their first United States headlining tour in the fall of 2016, with support from Ratboys and Free Throw.

=== You're Not As ____ As You Think (2017–2018) ===
The band released their third album, You're Not As As You Think, on March 17, 2017 via Triple Crown Records. The album's lead single, "No Halo", was released on January 19, 2017. Originally slated to support Modern Baseball's Spring 2017 tour, Sorority Noise announced a cross-country headlining tour with support from The Obsessives, Forth Wanderers, Sinai Vessel, Shannen Mose, and Citizen frontman Mat Kerekes after Modern Baseball unexpectedly broke up.

On October 12, 2017, the band announced a 7" single called "Alone" as a followup to You're Not As As You Think'. It was announced that the word "alone" is supposed to fill in the gap of the album's title. In support of this single, the band played a three-date headlining tour in Australia with support from Yours and Owls Festival, and the band supported Citizen on their U.S. Fall 2017 tour alongside Great Grandpa. On December 8, 2017, the band supported Foxing at the 20th anniversary showcase of Triple Crown Records, playing their third album in entirety.

On February 21, 2018, the band announced a complete re-working of You're Not As _____ As You Think entitled YNAAYT on the one-year anniversary of the album. The record features all songs from their previous LP reworked with strings, except for "Where Are You?" and "New Room", which were replaced with a cover of Leonard Cohen's "Chelsea Hotel #2" and a new song, "Windowwww", respectively.

In March 2018, Sorority Noise announced that they would be going on hiatus following their Spring 2018 tour due to frontman Cam Boucher's mental health. However, the band cancelled some of their tour dates with The Wonder Years after Boucher was accused of sexual assault on social media site Reddit. Boucher denied the allegations. In December 2018, the band released a statement on their official Facebook page, stating that Boucher had spoken to the person in question, and they had both 'made peace' with a situation that was 'not purposeful or malicious'.

== Musical style ==
Sorority Noise are described as a "melodic" indie rock band fusing elements of emo, pop-punk, and "mellow alt-rock". The bands' lyrics have been described as "introspective" and "reflective".

== Band members ==
Final lineup

- Cameron Boucher – lead vocals, rhythm guitar (2013–2018)
- Ryan McKenna – bass, vocals (2014–2018)
- Adam "Scuff" Ackerman – lead guitar, vocals, keyboards (2013–2018)
- Charlie Singer – drums (2014–2018)

Former members

- Jason Rule – drums (2013–2014)
- Kevin O'Donnell – bass (2013–2014)

Timeline

== Discography ==
Studio albums

- Forgettable (2014)
- Joy, Departed (2015)
- You're Not As As You Think (2017)

EPs

- Young Luck (2013)
- Quiet Hours (2013)
- It Kindly Stopped for Me (2016)
- Alone (2017)

Splits

- Sorority Noise / Somos (2014)
- Sorority Noise / Radiator Hospital (2014)
- Leaf Ellis/Smoke & Felt - Sorority Noise / The World Is A Beautiful Place & I Am No Longer Afraid To Die (2016)

Remix albums

- YNAAYT (2018)
