= Spraynard =

American punk band from West Chester, Pennsylvania

- Origin: West Chester, Pennsylvania
- Genres: Punk rock, pop punk, emo, skate punk
- Years active: 2008–2012, 2014–present
- Labels: Jade Tree, Asian Man, Runner Up, Lame-O
- Members: Pat Graham; Mark Dickinson; Pat Ware
- Past members: Jake Guralnik

Spraynard is an American punk rock band from West Chester, Pennsylvania.

== History ==
Spraynard began in 2008 with the release of a split EP with Captain, We're Sinking via Creep Records.

In 2010 the band released a split with Paramedic! via Square of Opposition Records and a split with Sundials via Evil Weevil Records. In the same year Spraynard released their debut full-length album titled Cut and Paste via Runner Up Records.

On May 10, 2011 Spraynard released their second full-length studio album titled Funtitled via Asian Man Records.

On April 17, 2012 Spraynard released an EP titled Exton Square via Asian Man Records and Square of Opposition Records.

In 2014 Spraynard released a collection record titled The Mark Tom And Patrick Show via Asian Man Records.

On April 28, 2015, Jade Tree released a song titled "Bench" from Spraynard's then upcoming third full-length studio album. The album, titled Mable, premiered on July 8 via Stereogum and was officially released on July 10.

== Musical style and ideology ==
Spraynard's sound has been described as "melodic, suburban pop-punk." Their music has drawn comparisons to Iron Chic and Dude Ranch-era Blink-182. Randall Colburn of Consequence stated that "their sound, muscular and anthemic, reflects that homespun grit, though it belies the band’s fierce strain of positivity." The band espouses progressivism, and is described by Colburn as a "working-class band." Lyrical themes explored by Spraynard include friendship and community.

== Other projects ==
Pat Graham also sings and plays guitar in Big Nothing and Pat Ware plays drums in Joyce Manor.

== Band members ==
- Pat Graham - guitar, vocals
- Mark Dickinson - bass
- Pat Ware - drums, vocals

Past members

- Jake Guralnik - bass
