= Slaughter Beach, Dog =

Indie rock band from Philadelphia, Pennsylvania

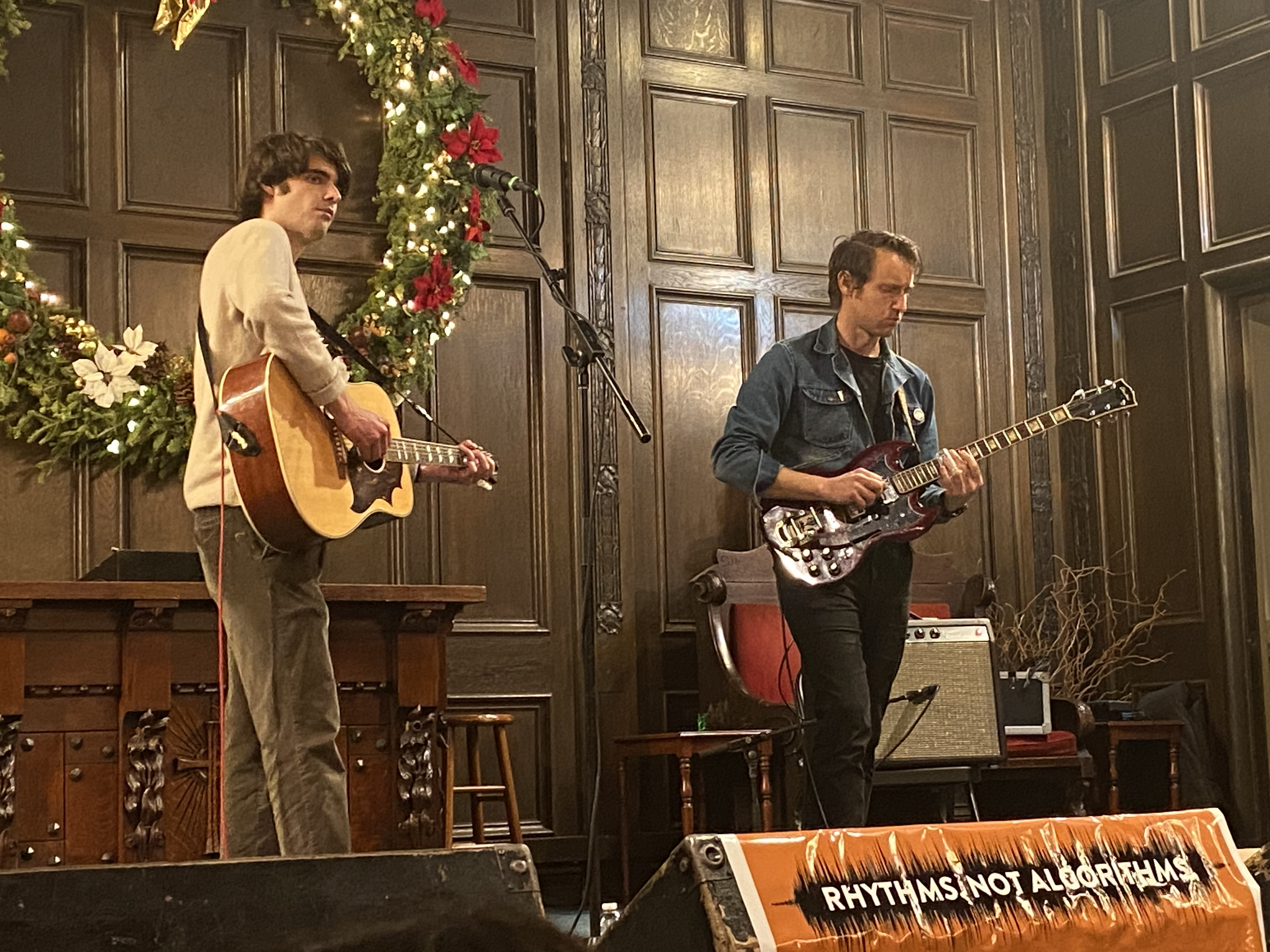
- Jake Ewald (left) and Adam Meisterhans (right) performing as Slaughter Beach, Dog in 2022

Background information
- Origin: Philadelphia, Pennsylvania
- Genres: Indie rock; alt-country; Americana; indie folk; folk rock
- Years active: 2014–present
- Labels: Lame-O Records; Big Scary Monsters
- Spinoff of: Modern Baseball, Superheaven, All Dogs
- Members: Jake Ewald; Ian Farmer; Zack Robbins; Adam Meisterhans; Logan Roth
- Past members: Nick Harris; Patrick Ware
- Website: slaughterbeachdog.com

Slaughter Beach, Dog is an indie rock band from Philadelphia, Pennsylvania, formed by former Modern Baseball co-lead vocalist Jake Ewald in 2014. Initially starting as one of Ewald's solo projects during his tenure with Modern Baseball, the group was realized after Modern Baseball went on indefinite hiatus. The lineup originally featured vocalist and guitarist Jake Ewald, bassist Ian Farmer (also from Modern Baseball), guitarist Nick Harris (departed in 2020) from All Dogs, and Superheaven drummer Zack Robbins.

== Background ==
The group had its beginnings as a solo project by Modern Baseball co-lead vocalist Jake Ewald after encountering writer's block. Ewald released the project's debut EP, Dawg, in 2014, under the new moniker. He was soon signed with Lame-O Records, the label responsible for managing Modern Baseball. Under his new label, in December 2016, Ewald introduced his self-produced debut LP as Slaughter Beach, Dog,Welcome, via Lame-O records, with generally positive reviews.

Following the announcement of Modern Baseball's hiatus in 2017, Ewald released EP Motorcycle.jpg in collaboration with former bandmate Ian Farmer in July. Ewald's second LP, Birdie, saw the project lineup expand with the addition of Farmer, Harris, and Robbins. With the project's newfound members, Slaughter Beach, Dog released Safe and Also No Fear in August of the following year, with a nationwide tour.

On December 24, 2020, the band's fourth studio album, At the Moonbase, was released. The album was written and recorded in solitude by Ewald due to the COVID-19 pandemic. The band's fifth studio album, Crying, Laughing, Waving, Smiling, released on September 22, 2023.

The name is derived from a town in Delaware called Slaughter Beach. Ewald expressed a desire to name the band Slaughter Beach, having come across the location traveling between his house in Philadelphia and his parents' house in Delaware. However, after discovering the name was already in use by another band in Europe, Ewald simply added a comma and the word "Dog".

== Members ==
Current members

- Jake Ewald – vocals, guitar, keyboards, harmonica (2014–present)
- Ian Farmer – bass, keyboards, backing vocals (2016–present), guitar (2015–2016)
- Adam Meisterhans – guitar (2022–present)
- Zack Robbins – drums, percussion, backing vocals, synth (2017–present)
- Logan Roth – keys, synth, percussion (2022–present)

Past members

- Patrick "Dos" Ware – drums (2015–2017)
- Nick Harris – guitar, keyboards, backing vocals (2015–2020)

== Discography ==
Studio albums

- Welcome (2016)
- Birdie (2017)
- Safe and Also No Fear (2019)
- At the Moonbase (2020)
- Crying, Laughing, Waving, Smiling (2023)

EPs

- Dawg (2014)
- Motorcycle.jpg (2017)

Singles

- "Monsters" (2016)
- "Building the Ark" (2017)
- "Acolyte" (2017)
- "Fish Fry" (2017)
- "Gold and Green" (2017)
- "Heart Attack" / "One Down" / "Good Ones" (2019)
- "Fair Shot" (2020)
- "Just Like Me" (2022)
- "Strange Weather" (2023)
- "Float Away" (2023)
- "Summer Windows" (2023)
- "Engine" (2023)
- "I'm In Love" (2024)

Live Albums

- Slaughter Beach, Dog on Audiotree Live (2017)
- Live at the Cabin (2022)
