= Lame-O Records =

American record label

- Founded: 2012
- Founder: Eric Osman
- Genre: Indie rock, punk rock
- Country of origin: United States
- Location: Philadelphia, Pennsylvania
- Official website: www.lameorecords.com

Lame-O Records is an independent record label based in Philadelphia, Pennsylvania. Founded by Eric Osman to release Modern Baseball's Sports, the label has been hailed as one of Philadelphia's best indie labels.

== History ==
Lame-O Records was founded in 2012 by Eric Osman, manager of the band Modern Baseball, to release the band's debut LP Sports. Osman funded the 300-copy pressing with savings earned working at coffee shops. Though Sports earned the label no profit, it quickly sold out and has subsequently been repressed four times.

The label was not originally supposed to continue beyond Sports, but Osman decided to take advantage of the opportunities afforded by the success of the first album. Lame-O began signing Philadelphia-area acts including Ma Jolie, Steady Hands, the Hundred Acre Woods, the Superweaks, and Three Man Cannon. Osman enlisted fellow Drexel University student Emily Hakes during the planning stages of the Hundred Acre Woods' Cold in the Morning 7" single, shortly before the label expanded beyond Philly in 2014, signing the London-based group Johnny Foreigner.

The label earned acclaim in 2015 for their successful Strength in Weakness compilation. The six-way split (featuring Lame-O's Modern Baseball and The Superweaks as well as Spraynard, Marietta, Hurry, and Beach Slang) was sold to raise money for United Cerebral Palsy in honor of Modern Vinyl managing editor James Cassar. The 500-copy pressing sold out immediately. The EP also served as Hakes' senior project for her music industry degree, while the accompanying shows at First Unitarian and Saint Vitus was Osman's for his entertainment & artist management degree.

Lame-O has earned praise for their DIY ethic and commitment; Ma Jolie frontman Kirk Malosh commented, "It’s like they’re in the band... Any time anyone puts that much of an investment into your music, it’s unbelievable."

== Artists ==
- An Horse
- Attia Taylor
- Big Nothing
- Cartalk
- Dazy
- Dominic Angelella
- Dust Star
- Gladie
- Golden Apples
- Great Cynics
- The Hundred Acre Woods
- Hurry
- Johnny Foreigner
- Lily Seabird
- Lithuania
- Loose Tooth
- Lowercase Roses
- Ma Jolie
- The Max Levine Ensemble
- Mike Bell & The Movies
- Modern Baseball
- No Thank You
- The Obsessives
- The Pooches
- Provide
- Saintseneca
- Shannen Moser
- Slaughter Beach, Dog
- Slippers
- Steady Hands
- superviolet
- The Superweaks
- Thin Lips
- Three Man Cannon
- Trace Mountains
- U.S. Highball
- Walter Etc.
- WPTR
- Yankee Bluff
- Year of Glad
- Yours Are The Only Ears

=== Former artists ===
- Mo Troper

== Compilations ==
Strength in Weakness (Split EP to raise money for United Cerebral Palsy)

- Released: 3 February 2015
- Format: 12" EP, digital download
- Tracks:
1. "Haulin' Oats" by Spraynard
2. "Call Me Away" by The Weaks (now the Superweaks)
3. "Alpha Kappa Fall Of Troy The Movie Part Deux" by Modern Baseball
4. "Old Joe" by Marietta
5. "Shake It Off" by Hurry
6. "Too Late to Die Young" by Beach Slang

Lame-O Records 2015 Sampler

- Released: 10 October 2015
- Format: Digital download
- Tracks:
1. "Divorce Year" by Thin Lips
2. "My Valerian" by The Max Levine Ensemble
3. "Heart Attack" by The Pooches
4. "Summer Sounds" by Lowercase Roses
5. "Grace" by Steady Hands
6. "Gold Or Silver" by Three Man Cannon
7. "Special Baby" by Cherry (now Golden Apples)
8. "JOBS" by Slaughter Beach, Dog
9. "Umbro Season" by Year Of Glad
10. "Frances Quinlan Will Have Her Revenge on Philadelphia" by The Superweaks
11. "Revenge Of The Nameless Ranger" by Modern Baseball
12. "Hardcore Friends" by Lithuania

Don't Stand So Close to Me: A Lame-O Compilation for Self-Isolation

- Released: 31 March 2020
- Format: Digital download
- Tracks:
1. "Friend Of Mine" by U.S. Highball
2. "How to Keep Composure (Demo)" by Hurry
3. "Yellow Teeth" by Slaughter Beach, Dog
4. "A Pace Far Different (Demo)" by Gladie
5. "Hallways of You" by Lowercase Roses
6. "My Light is Going Out" by Shannen Moser
7. "Ship Of Fools (Demo)" by An Horse
8. "Fallin' Rain (Demo)" by Trace Mountains
9. "Anything" by Dominic Angelella
10. "olfactory" by No Thank You
11. "Uninspired" by The Max Levine Ensemble
12. "Jetpack" by The Superweaks
13. "Wildflower" by Cherry (now Golden Apples)
14. "Red Yellow and Blue" by Thin Lips
15. "Evaline" by Mike Bell & the Movies
16. "Hardhat" by Yankee Bluff
17. "No More Funerals (Acoustic)" by Steady Hands
