= Modern Baseball =

American emo band

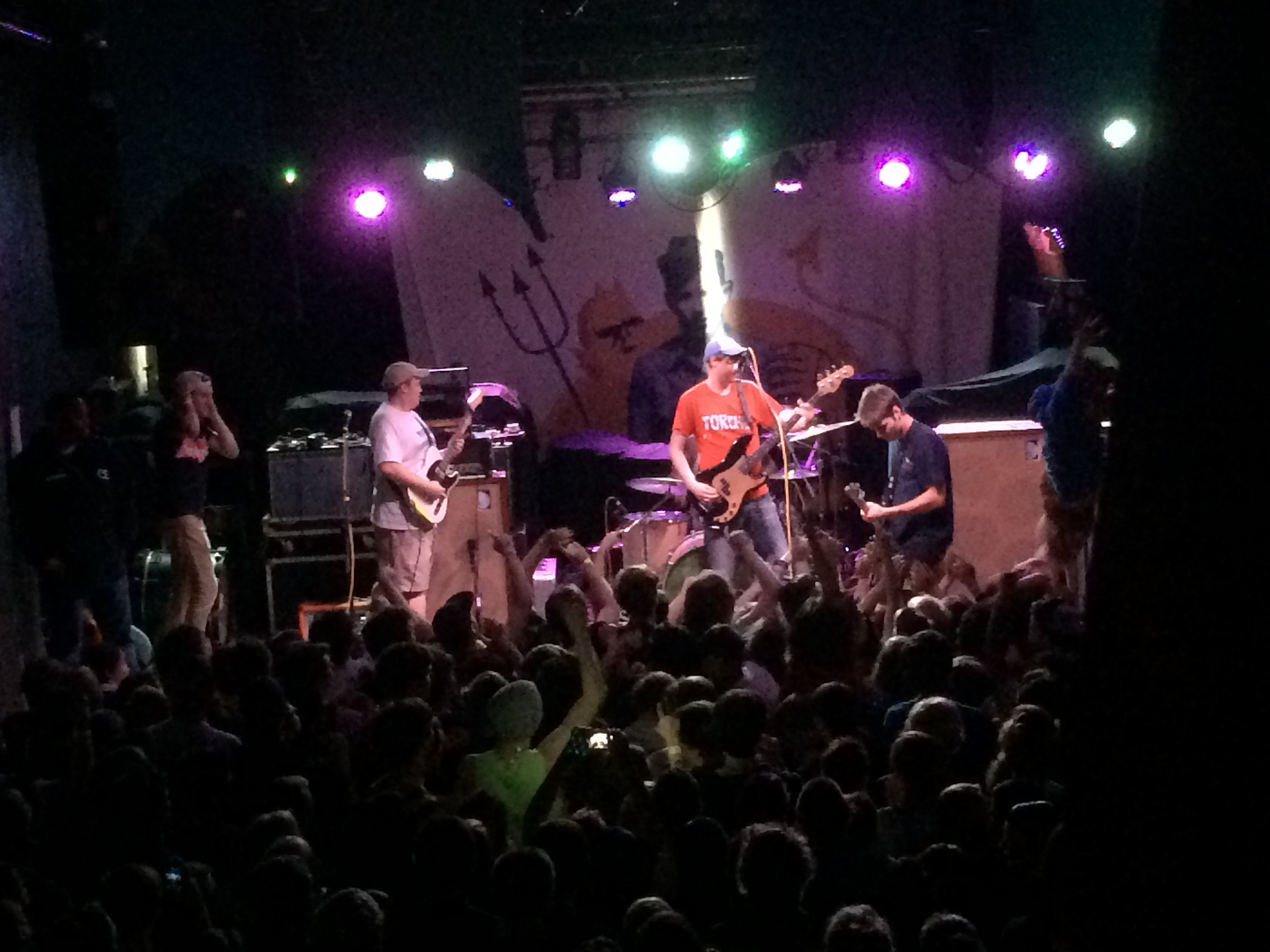

Background information
- Origin: Philadelphia, Pennsylvania, U.S.
- Genres: Emo; indie rock; pop punk; folk punk
- Years active: 2011–2017
- Labels: Lame-O; Run for Cover; Big Scary Monsters
- Spinoffs: Slaughter Beach, Dog
- Past members: Bren Lukens; Jake Ewald; Sean Huber; Ian Farmer
- Website: modernbaseballpa.com

Modern Baseball (sometimes abbreviated as MoBo) was an American emo band from Philadelphia, Pennsylvania, consisting of Bren Lukens, Jake Ewald, Sean Huber, and Ian Farmer. The band formed in 2012 at Drexel University and released their first album, Sports, on Lame-O Records that same year. Their following albums, You're Gonna Miss It All and Holy Ghost, were released on Run For Cover Records in 2014 and 2016 respectively. The group has been on hiatus since 2017.

== History ==
=== Early years and success (2011–2016) ===
Bren Lukens (Note: Born Brendan Lukens. Bren uses they/them pronouns.) and Jake Ewald met in high school when Lukens was interested in Ewald's twin sister. They belonged to different friend groups but found common ground through music. Their name was inspired by a book that Lukens and Ewald found in Ewald’s basement, titled Modern Baseball Techniques.

The duo would record the EP The Nameless Ranger in 2010. Lukens formed a solo project called BTFL, which released one EP, Dude: The Love of Your Life Has Some Serious Issues, which included the tracks "The Weekend" and "I Think You Were in My Profile Picture Once," that were rerecorded for Modern Baseball's debut studio album Sports in 2012.

Originally from Brunswick, Maryland, they relocated to Philadelphia to attend college, with Lukens attending Chestnut Hill College and Ewald attending Drexel University. In Philadelphia, they met fellow music lover Ian Farmer, who helped them record their first album, Sports, in Drexel's recording studios. Sports was released in 2012, and shortly thereafter the group temporarily left college to pursue music professionally.

The band's first concert was in their shared house near Drexel University. The price of entry was either $3 or a picture of Michael Jordan. The house was later dubbed "The Michael Jordan House", which became a center for underground bands in the area. The music video for "The Weekend" was centered within various parts of the house, including its basement. The quartet started playing house shows around the area with bands like the Menzingers, Ted Nguyent, and Cayetana.

The group's second full-length album, You're Gonna Miss It All, was released on Run For Cover Records in 2014, reaching #97 on the Billboard 200. The group toured the United States in early 2014 with the Wonder Years. Modern Baseball toured the United Kingdom in September 2014. The band spoke ahead of their tour explaining how they manage their busy schedules. In late 2015, the band announced plans for their third album that would be released in 2016 through Run For Cover Records, titled Holy Ghost. On February 25, 2016, the band announced that the album would be released on May 13, 2016 via Run For Cover and on Big Scary Monsters in the UK and Europe. Holy Ghost was produced by Joe Reinhart at Headroom Studios in Philadelphia.

In May 2016, Modern Baseball embarked on The Holy Ghost Tour with Thin Lips and Joyce Manor. In fall 2016, Modern Baseball supported Brand New on tour along with the Front Bottoms.

=== Hiatus (2017) ===
In January 2017, Bren Lukens released a statement saying they would not be joining the band on their upcoming Europe/UK tour, instead opting to stay at home to focus on their mental and physical well-being. In February 2017, the band announced that they would be canceling their US tour and taking a break to help protect their mental health and friendships.

The group played no shows in the spring of 2017, during which Ewald and Farmer worked on producing Ewald's project Slaughter Beach, Dog, and Lukens and Huber worked on solo material. When interviewed in June 2017, Ewald remarked: "Let's not call it a breakup and make a huge deal about it and have a 'Last Show Ever' or anything like that. Let's just take it easy for now, and if we wake up an[d] want to do it again, then let's do it."

A few shows followed; in July 2017, Modern Baseball played a one-off show with Daniel Johnston as part of his final US tour, and in October 2017, the band played three consecutive shows in their hometown of Philadelphia. In an October 2017 interview, Ewald confirmed that the band had no plans to play any more shows for the foreseeable future.

=== Current work (2017–present) ===
Despite currently being on hiatus, Modern Baseball still releases projects for anniversaries of their albums and EPs. In 2024, for the 10th anniversary of Modern Baseball's second album, You're Gonna Miss It All, they rereleased two old demos of "Rock Bottom" and "Pothole", previously released on their compilation album, Techniques.

In 2025, for the 10th anniversary of their EP, MoBo Presents: The Perfect Cast, Modern Baseball released the live album, MOBO Presents: The Perfect Cast LP feat. Modern Baseball (30th Anniversary Ultimate Edition). The album contained the 6 songs from the original EP and 7 live recordings.

Since 2026, Bren Lukens has played multiple solo, acoustic sets at various venues in the United States, their first performances since Modern Baseball's hiatus. On June 23, Lukens played a show at Johnny Brenda's in Philadelphia, PA. On July 21, they opened for Jeff Rosenstock at Metro Chicago in Chicago, IL. On September 24, they announced a performance at the Something In The Way Festival Pre-Show at the Sinclair in Cambridge, MA on February 4, 2027.

== Musical style and themes ==
The band's debut album, Sports, has been described as indie emo, folk punk, pop and pop punk. You're Gonna Miss It All has also been described as emo, midwest emo, folk rock, indie folk, indie rock, pop punk, power pop, and rock. Holy Ghost was described as emo and indie rock.

The band's lyrical themes include romance, death, addiction, mental illness and friendship, according to Consequence. A Pitchfork article said: "Where many second-wave pop punk and emo songwriters would respond to romantic rejection by shaming the opposite sex, Brendan Lukens and Jake Ewald strive for something more even-handed."

Bren Lukens has spoken about their mental health struggles, having been diagnosed with depression and Bipolar disorder. Most of the songs on the album Holy Ghost are about the depression Lukens experienced after their 2015 tour. “Tripping in the Dark” tells of an event in which Lukens climbed on the roof of their home, planning to die by suicide by jumping. They did not jump after getting a text from Ewald. After a few years of alcoholism, Lukens became sober on September 14, 2015.

== Band members ==
- Bren Lukens – guitar, lead vocals
- Jake Ewald – guitar, lead vocals
- Sean Huber – drums, backing vocals
- Ian Farmer – bass, backing vocals

== Discography ==
Studio albums

- Sports (2012)
- You're Gonna Miss It All (2014)
- Holy Ghost (2016)
