= Krazy Fest =

American music festival

- Genre: Emotional hardcore; melodic hardcore; post-hardcore; punk rock; metalcore
- Dates: May–August
- Locations: Louisville, Kentucky
- Years active: 1998–2003, 2011
- Founders: Scott Ritcher; Andy Rich; Jason Noble; Mark Brickey
- Organiser: Initial Records

Krazy Fest (originally stylized as Krazy✻Fest!) was an American music festival hosted in Louisville, Kentucky. It ran annually from 1998 to 2003, with a one-off comeback in 2011. The first three editions were held during Memorial Day Weekend in mid-late May. From 2001 to 2003, it was held between mid-June to early August.

The event was first organized by Scott Ritcher (then-vocalist of the band Metroschifter) and Andy Rich, who were both co-owners of the emotional hardcore record label Initial Records, in partnership with Jason Noble (then-vocalist of the band Shipping News), and Mark Brickey (then-vocalist of the band The Enkindels). Noble and Brickey were also involved with Initial Records in various functions. Ryan Patterson, senior vice-president of Initial Records, came on board in 2001. As such, the festival principally showcased emotional hardcore bands (including many signed to Initial Records), but also included melodic hardcore, post-hardcore, punk rock, hardcore punk, metalcore, and indie rock acts.

While in its seventh year's planning in early 2004, Patterson announced to the press that the festival would be postponed from its usual spring or summer date to later in the fall. Patterson stated that the issue rose from the lack of availability for headlining bands and the increased cost of getting bands to play the festival. Initial Records also became defunct around the same time. In late 2004, a VHS/DVD of Krazy Fest 4 and 5 was announced but it was never released.

After receiving Rich's blessing in 2010, new promoter Andrew Tinsley (former manager of the band Endpoint) brought back Krazy Fest for Memorial Day Weekend in 2011. Tinsley hoped to continue the festival in 2012, but was unable to due to scheduling conflicts.

== Krazy Fest lineups by year ==
=== May 29–31, 1998: Krazy✻Fest! ===
Location: Brewery Thunderdome.

Notes: The festival was originally to take place at Stage Door Johnnies in Louisville, Kentucky, but it was moved to the Brewery Thunderdome. The split CD between Metroschifter and Shipping News was released at the event, as was Cave In's debut studio album Until Your Heart Stops. Due to an electrical storm and a subsequent power outage on the evening of Sunday May 31, headlining bands Superchunk and Shipping News were not able to perform. Two bands did not perform on Saturday May 30 due to one breaking up and another breaking down in Pennsylvania; one of the bands that played on Friday May 29 was asked to play a second set on Saturday to compensate.

==== Friday, May 29 ====
- Apocalypse Hoboken
- Grade
- Silent Majority
- The Enkindels
- The Suicide Machines

==== Saturday, May 30 ====
- Automatic
- BoySetsFire
- Buried Alive
- Coalesce
- Converge
- Speak 714
- Snapcase
- Ten Yard Fight
- Today Is the Day
- Torn Apart

==== Sunday, May 31 ====
- Elliott
- Empire State Games
- Jejune
- King for a Day
- Metroschifter
- Shipping News
- Superchunk
- Uzeda

=== May 21–23, 1999: Krazy✻Fest 1999! ===
Location: The Belvedere.

Notes: Cave In did not perform due to a van fire earlier in its tour. Ink & Dagger was scheduled to perform, but did not show up.

==== Friday, May 21 ====
- H_{2}O
- Kill Your Idols
- Out
- The Enkindels
- The Get Up Kids
- Saves the Day

==== Saturday, May 22 ====
- Braid
- Buried Alive
- Burn It Down
- Cave In
- Fastbreak
- Jejune
- My Own Victim
- Shai Hulud
- Sick of It All
- Silent Majority
- Snapcase
- Zao

==== Sunday, May 23 ====
- Elliott
- Jimmy Eat World
- Le Shok
- Metroschifter
- Red Sun
- Sarge
- Shipping News
- The Jazz June
- Victory at Sea

=== May 19–21, 2000: Krazy Fest 3 K2K ===
Location: The Belvedere.

Notes: In addition to Initial Records, the festival was also sponsored by eMusic. The Dillinger Escape Plan vocalist Dimitri Minakakis injured audience members by swinging his microphone chord during the band's set and hitting people in the face with the microphone. The festival was announced as By the Grace of God's final show, though the band would perform one more show at the BRYCC House a few weeks later.

==== Friday, May 19 ====
- BoySetsFire
- Burn It Down
- River City High
- Skam Impaired
- The Enkindels
- The Suicide Machines

==== Saturday, May 20 ====
- AFI
- As Friends Rust
- Brother's Keeper
- Cave In
- Drowningman
- Grade
- One King Down
- Reach the Sky
- Saves the Day
- The Dillinger Escape Plan
- The National Acrobat
- Time in Malta

==== Sunday, May 21 ====
- Buried Alive
- By the Grace of God
- Good Clean Fun
- Hot Rod Circuit
- King for a Day
- Moods for Moderns
- Stretch Arm Strong
- The Jazz June
- The Juliana Theory
- The Movielife

=== July 27–29, 2001: Krazy Fest 4 ===
Location: Louisville Water Tower.

Notes: The Dillinger Escape Plan played with special guest vocalist Sean Ingram.

==== Friday, July 27 ====
- Avail
- Pflanz
- Holy Angels
- Hot Water Music
- Planes Mistaken for Stars
- Small Brown Bike
- The Story So Far

==== Saturday, July 28 ====
- American Nightmare
- Bane
- Blood Red
- Botch
- Burnt by the Sun
- BoySetsFire
- Christiansen
- Converge
- Ensign
- Harkonen
- Poison the Well
- Stretch Arm Strong
- The Dillinger Escape Plan
- The Hope Conspiracy

==== Sunday, July 29 ====
- Alkaline Trio
- Dashboard Confessional
- Elliott
- Fairweather
- Further Seems Forever
- Hey Mercedes
- Hot Rod Circuit
- Saves the Day
- The Jazz June
- The White Octave

=== June 21–23, 2002: Krazy Fest 5 ===
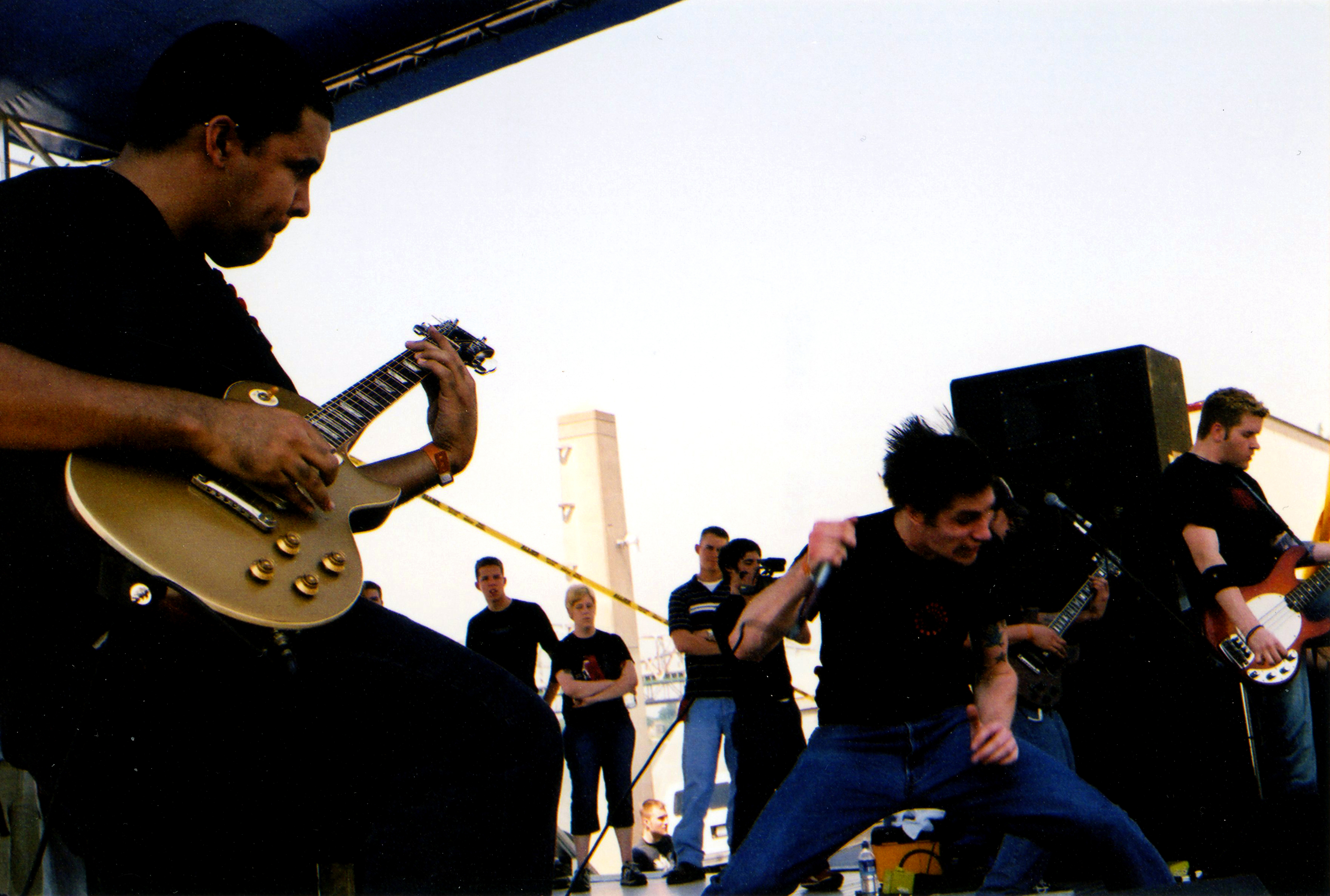
American melodic hardcore band As Friends Rust performing at Krazy Fest 5 on June 22, 2002.

Location: Louisville Waterfront Park.

Notes: Planes Mistaken for Stars and The Jazz June were booked for the festival but cancelled their appearances in May 2002. Planes Mistaken for Stars was replaced by Most Precious Blood. Drowningman was originally scheduled to perform on Friday June 21 but it was moved to Saturday June 22.

==== Friday, June 21 ====
- Bane
- Reach the Sky
- Sick of It All
- Snapcase
- Stretch Arm Strong
- The Hope Conspiracy

==== Saturday, June 22 ====
- AFI
- As Friends Rust
- Black Widows
- Blood Red
- Converge
- Corn on Macabre
- Drowningman
- From Autumn to Ashes
- Most Precious Blood
- NORA
- The Dillinger Escape Plan
- The Glasspack
- Tiger Army

==== Sunday, June 23 ====
- Cadillac Blindside
- Christiansen
- Elliott
- Milemarker
- Onelinedrawing
- Small Brown Bike
- The Reputation
- The Rocking Horse Winner
- Thursday
- Ultimate Fakebook

=== August 1–3, 2003: Krazyfest 6 ===
Location: Louisville Waterfront Park.

Notes: The Beautiful Mistake was booked to play on Friday August 1 but cancelled their appearances in July 2003; the band was replaced by Elliott.

==== Friday, August 1 ====
- A Static Lullaby
- Blue Sky Mile
- Elliott
- Midtown
- Reggie and the Full Effect
- This Day Forward
- Ultimate Fakebook

==== Saturday, August 2 ====
- Andrew W.K.
- Anodyne
- Atreyu
- Black Cross
- Burnt by the Sun
- Every Time I Die
- Hatebreed
- Hopesfall
- Mastodon
- Planes Mistaken for Stars
- Playing Enemy
- Terror
- The Blood Brothers
- The Hope Conspiracy
- The Locust
- The Suicide File
- Throwdown
- With Honor

==== Sunday, August 3 ====
- Armor for Sleep
- Dillinger Four
- Bear vs. Shark
- Cave In
- Christiansen
- Fairweather
- Helicopter Helicopter
- Hey Mercedes
- Paint It Black
- Recover
- Roy
- Rye Coalition
- Sense Field
- The Bouncing Souls
- The Explosion
- The Jazz June
- The Reputation

=== May 20–22, 2011: Krazy Fest 2011 ===
Location: Expo Five.

Notes: The 2011 come-back event was the first to include more than one stage; the bands were split onto three stages.

==== Friday, May 20 ====
===== Stage A =====
- Against Me!
- Bane
- By the Grace of God
- Chamberlain
- Lions Lions
- Moving Mountains
- Xerxes

===== Stage B =====
- End of a Year
- Kevin Seconds
- Reading Group
- Small Brown Bike
- Strike Anywhere
- The Bled
- Tigers Jaw

==== Saturday, May 21 ====
===== Stage A =====
- 7 Seconds
- Anti-Flag
- Cave In
- Dead End Path
- Evolett
- Fireworks
- Hot Water Music
- Lemuria
- Pianos Become the Teeth

===== Stage B =====
- Disembodied
- La Dispute
- Make Do and Mend
- Title Fight
- Touché Amoré

===== Stage C =====
- Another Mistake
- Defeater
- Former Thieves
- Hostage Calm
- Native

==== Sunday, May 22 ====
===== Stage A =====
- Coalesce
- Hot Rod Circuit
- I Hate Our Freedom
- Lucero
- Onelinedrawing
- The Bouncing Souls
- This Is Hell

===== Stage B =====
- Ensign
- Frontier(s)
- Samiam

===== Stage C =====
- A Great Big Pile of Leaves
- Dave Hause
- Daytrader
- Straight A's
