= Photorecording =

Compilation album by Elliott
- Released: October 4, 2005
- Recorded: Tracks 1-7 recorded in December 2003; Tracks 8-12 & 14 recorded variously Track 13 recorded in March 2000
- Genres: Emo, Indie rock
- Length: 70:42 (CD); 41:14 (DVD); 111:56 (total)
- Label: Revelation Records

Elliott chronology
Song in the Air (2003)	Photorecording (2005)	Songs in a Transit Wind (2013)

Professional ratings
Review scores
Source	Rating
LAS Magazine	6/10
Ox-Fanzine	8/10
Punknews.org	4/5 stars

Photorecording is a compilation album by American emo band Elliott. The songs were recorded live during the last years of the band's career. The first seven tracks were recorded live, direct-to-tape in December 2003. The album comes with a bonus DVD featuring a documentary about their last tour. The songs recorded are a collection of songs from all their albums, including b-sides and demos.

== Track listing ==
=== CD ===
No.	Title	Length
1.	"Away We Drift [Live]"	5:13
2.	"Drive Onto Me [Live]"	4:24
3.	"Dionysus Burning [Live]"	5:05
4.	"Blessed by Your Own Ghost [Live]"	7:11
5.	"Calm Americans [Live]"	4:53
6.	"Shallow Like Your Breath [Live]"	6:09
7.	"Drag Like Pull [Live]"	4:32
8.	"Bleed in Breathe Out"	4:32
9.	"Drive"	5:46
10.	"Believe (Alternate Version)"	4:35
11.	"Carry On (Alternate Version)"	4:15
12.	"This Program Is Not Responding"	7:36
13.	"Leona"	2:48
14.	"Intro to False Cathedrals"	3:43

=== DVD ===
No.	Title	Length
1.	"In Transition: A Film About Elliott"	36:30
2.	"Speed of Film (Live in Philadelphia)"	4:44
