= As Friends Rust =

American melodic hardcore band

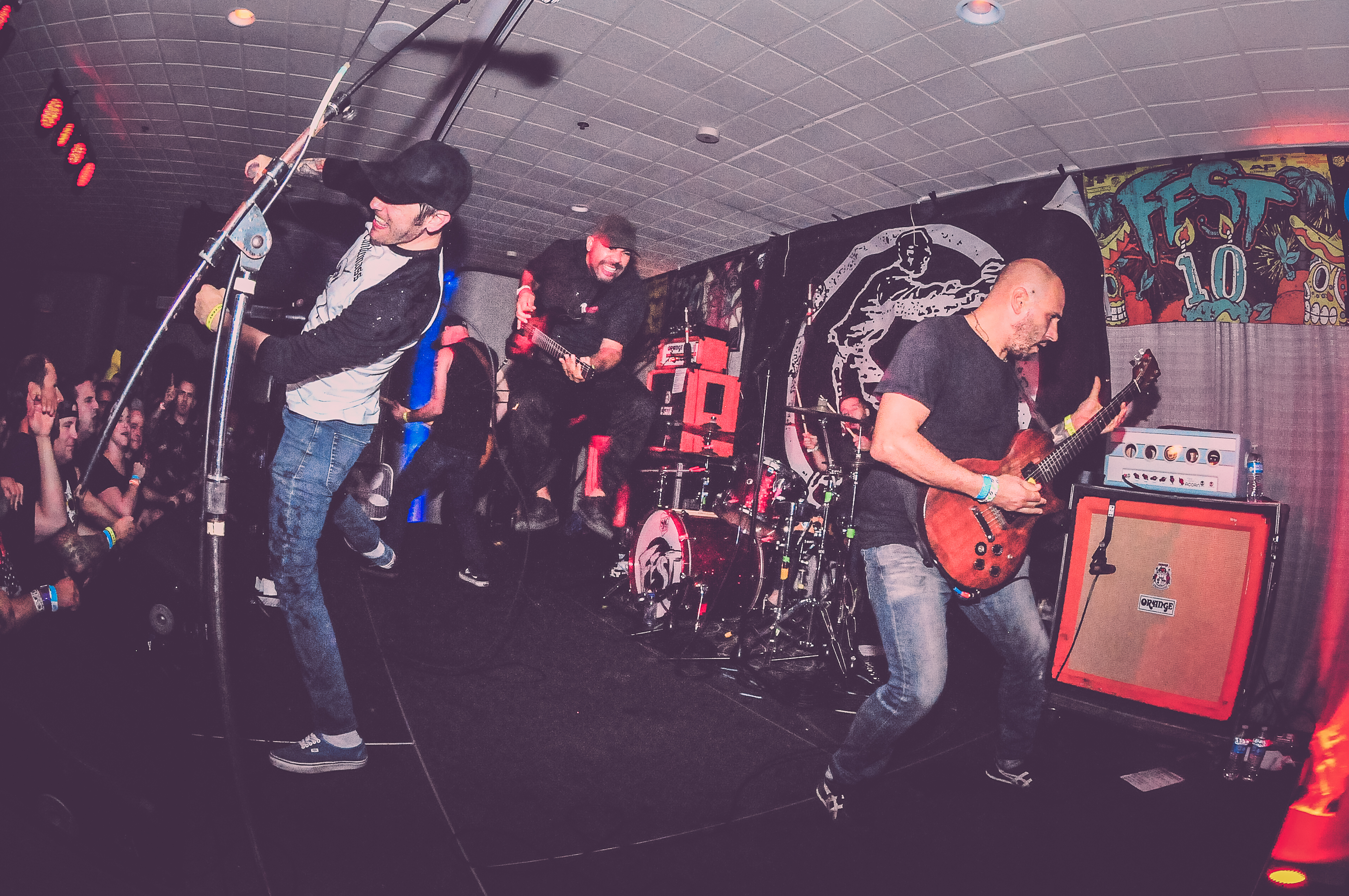
- As Friends Rust performing at The Fest 14 in Gainesville, Florida on October 31, 2015. From left to right: Damien Moyal, Kaleb Stewart, Joseph Simmons, Timothy Kirkpatrick, and James Glayat.

Background information
- Origin: Davie, Florida, United States
- Genres: Melodic hardcore
- Works: As Friends Rust discography
- Years active: 1996–1997, 1997–2002, 2008–present
- Labels: Cosmic Note; Defiance; Demons Run Amok; Doghouse; End Hits; Equal Vision; Golf; Good Life; Howling Bull; Initial; Punkervision; Shield; Stick to the Core; Unity Worldwide
- Members: Damien Moyal; Timothy Kirkpatrick; Joseph Simmons; James Glayat; Andrew Seward
- Past members: (see list of As Friends Rust members)

As Friends Rust is an American melodic hardcore band based in Gainesville, Florida. The original line-up, which included vocalist Damien Moyal, guitarist Henry Olmino, bass guitarist Jeronimo Gomez, and drummer Matthew Crum, formed in Davie, Florida in September 1996. After recording a demo tape but failing to secure a record deal, the band parted ways in February 1997.

Following his move to Gainesville, Florida, Moyal reformed As Friends Rust in June 1997, with a new line-up made-up mostly of then-members of his other band Culture, ultimately stabilizing the band with drummer Timothy Kirkpatrick, guitarists Gordon Tarpley and Joseph Simmons, and bass guitarist and backing vocalist Kaleb Stewart. The band released its debut EP, The Fists of Time, via Good Life Recordings in 1998, prior to which Tarpley was replaced by Peter Bartsocas. After an American tour, Bartsocas was replaced by James Glayat and As Friends Rust released a split with Discount, also on Good Life in 1998, supported by a European and British tour. The band signed with Doghouse Records and released the 1999 EP, As Friends Rust, ensuing a series of American, European, and British tours for the next two years, along with reissues of early material.

Inner tensions caused line-up changes in 2000, culminating with Glayat, Kirkpatrick, and Stewart quitting. Moyal and Simmons reconstructed the band by recruiting guitarist and backing vocalist Christopher "Floyd" Beckham, drummer Zachary Swain, and bass guitarist Thomas Rankine. The new line-up recorded As Friends Rust's debut full-length album, Won, for Doghouse / Defiance in 2001, and embarked on extensive American, European, and British tours. As Friends Rust signed with Equal Vision Records and released the 2002 EP A Young Trophy Band in the Parlance of Our Times, by which time tensions had again surfaced, resulting with Moyal quitting the band at the peak of its popularity. Beckham quickly took up lead vocals, until Adam D'Zurilla was welcomed as Moyal's replacement a month later. With D'Zurilla, As Friends Rust toured the United States, Canada, Europe, and the United Kingdom several times, before Beckham, too, quit the band. In September 2002, the remaining members of As Friends Rust announced their continuation under the new band name of Salem.

As Friends Rust reunited in March 2008, with Moyal, Kirkpatrick, Stewart, Simmons, and Glayat reprising the 1998–2000 line-up. The band embarked on a European and British tour in 2008, followed by a Japanese tour in 2014. As Friends Rust has since performed a series of American and European festival dates in 2015 and 2019, supporting its compilation albums Greatest Hits? and The Porch Days: 1998 to 2000. In 2019, Stewart was dismissed; the band has since been without a permanent bass guitarist. In 2020, As Friends Rust released the EP, Up from the Muck, through Unity Worldwide Records and Stick to the Core Records, containing its first-recorded material in eighteen years. The band's second full-length album, Any Joy, was released via End Hits Records in 2023. The material features contribution by bass guitarist Andrew Seward, who also accompanied the band during its European tour promoting the release. 2024 saw the band release another EP, Lightless, which coincided with another European tour.

== History ==
=== First incarnation (1996–1997) ===
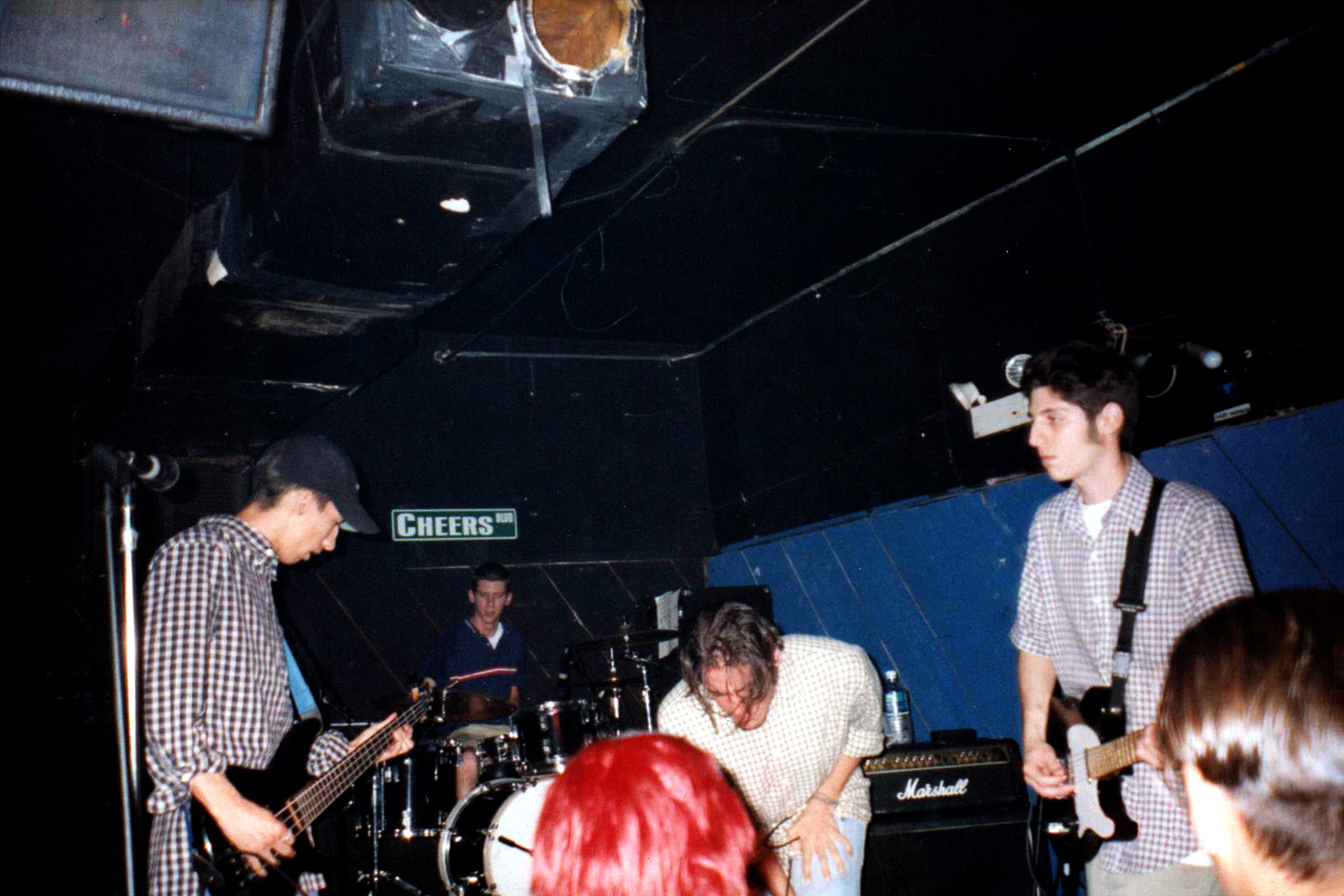
As Friends Rust performing with its original members at Cheers in Coconut Grove, Florida on November 11, 1996. From left to right: Jeronimo Gomez, Matthew Crum, Damien Moyal, and Henry Olmino.

In September 1996, vocalist Damien Moyal was invited to a band practice in Davie, Florida by guitarist Henry Olmino, bass guitarist Jeronimo Gomez, and drummer Matthew Crum; the three had been playing under the name Wayside, originally with vocalist Robert Rudas, since 1994. Moyal had previously been the vocalist in Culture, Shai Hulud, and Morning Again, and was then simultaneously playing in Bird of Ill Omen, and had just rejoined Culture (having originally left that band in April 1995).

Moyal named the new melodic hardcore band As Friends Rust, after the lyrics "as days count down and as friends rust from exposure to exposure," penned in early 1996 while in Shai Hulud, planned for a song titled "Now Ruin Is". Instead of using Moyal's lyrics, Shai Hulud guitarist Matthew Fox wrote new lyrics and the song became "My Heart Bleeds the Darkest Blood" (originally sung by Moyal, but later recorded with vocalist Chad Gilbert). After being kicked out of Shai Hulud, Moyal took the unused lyrics to his next band, Morning Again. While Morning Again did write a song titled "Now Ruin Is" using Moyal's lyrics, it was thrown out shortly after Moyal was kicked out in June 1996. Moyal again re-used the abandoned lyrics for a Bird of Ill Omen song in August 1996, and a month later As Friends Rust was formed. Bird of Ill Omen later recorded the song "Now Ruin Is" for its debut album, Self, Dare You Still Breathe?, but with vocalist William Shane Post, who replaced Moyal in April 1997.

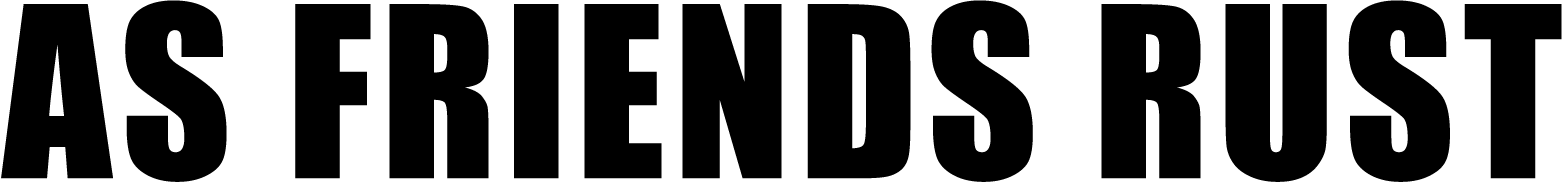
As Friends Rust's first logo, designed by Damien Moyal for the band's demo tape in November 1996. It was subsequently used on As Friends Rust and Eleven Songs in 1999, and a slightly modified version was used on Won (2001) and A Young Trophy Band in the Parlance of Our Times (2002).

Moyal later described the meaning behind the band's name:

"It's basically about relationships coming and going. Sometimes you place a lot of energy and focus on your relationships or friendships with the wrong people. Or sometimes you don't place enough focus or attention on your relationships with the right people, and people just come and go out of your life".

As Friends Rust played its first show on September 19, 1996, at Cheers in Coconut Grove, Florida. The event was a Pixies tribute show and As Friends Rust performed covers of the songs "Hey" and "The Sad Punk". After writing nearly a dozen original songs (including some that were never recorded, like "Superheroes," "Kid," and "I Know"), the band entered Wisner Productions in Davie, Florida to record six of them ("Encante," "Ruffian," "Broken Brain," "When People Resort to Name Calling," "The Only Point," and an untitled instrumental acoustic song) with producer James Paul Wisner from November 19–22, 1996. Three of the songs, "Encante," "Ruffian," and "Broken Brain," were used on a demo tape shopped to such record labels as Revelation Records (which had signed Moyal's previous band, Shai Hulud, earlier that year, and would shortly thereafter sign Morning Again, also based on material recorded with Moyal), Doghouse Records, Equal Vision Records, Jade Tree, Art Monk Construction, and Network Sound; however, the band only received rejection letters.

By February 1997, this incarnation of As Friends Rust had fallen apart as Moyal dedicated more time to Culture and Bird of Ill Omen. Olmino, Gomez, and Crum opted to continue playing together, renaming the band Red Letter Day and asking Rudas to return as vocalist. After releasing an extended play as Red Letter Day on Eulogy Recordings in October 1997, the same core members later formed The Rocking Horse Winner, while Olmino also played with Anchorman and Dashboard Confessional, Gomez also played with Poison the Well, and Crum also played with Helado Negro and Damien Done.

=== The "Porch House" era (1997–2000) ===
==== The Fists of Time and first tours (1997–1998) ====
The idea to reform As Friends Rust was brought up in June 1997, by Culture's guitarist, Stephen Looker, who had been a fan of the band's demo. Unbeknownst to Moyal, Looker had been approached by Olmino earlier that year as a potential second guitarist for As Friends Rust shortly before its first break-up. Moyal was still commuting from Miami, Florida to rehearse with Culture, but had made plans to move to Gainesville, Florida in August 1997, following the band's first European tour. To complete the second incarnation of As Friends Rust in Gainesville, Moyal and Looker invited Culture's new drummer, Jason Dooley, and Culture's bass guitarist, Gordon Tarpley, the latter of whom agreed to play guitar in the side-project. Looker then approached Hot Water Music's bass guitarist, Jason Black, who agreed to take up the same position in As Friends Rust. Inspired by the band's proposed line-up, Moyal dubbed a new batch of As Friends Rust demo tapes with updated liner notes announcing its new members, to take with him on Culture's first European and British tour and secure a record deal. Culture's Belgian record label, Good Life Recordings, showed immediate interest in signing As Friends Rust and plans were made for the band to become active again before the end of 1997. However, Culture and Hot Water Music's busy touring schedules and recording agendas kept As Friends Rust on the back-burner for several months, and neither Dooley nor Black took active parts in As Friends Rust's eventual activities.

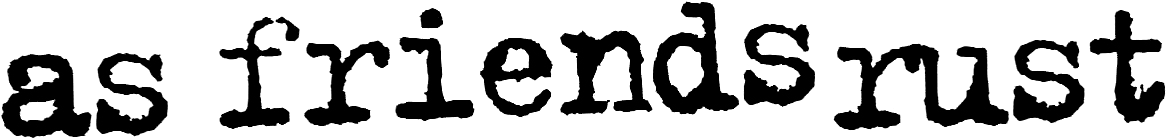
As Friends Rust's second logo, designed by Damien Moyal for the band's debut release, The Fists of Time, in 1998.

In September 1997, drummer Timothy Kirkpatrick (formerly of the emo band Roosevelt) replaced Dooley in both As Friends Rust and Culture. Though Looker and Kirkpatrick wrote a handful of new As Friends Rust songs together between Culture tours, the reformed band came to a halt when Looker quit both As Friends Rust and Culture to join Morning Again, moving to Coral Springs, Florida in March 1998. Looker would later join ex-As Friends Rust members in Red Letter Day (with Chris Carrabba having replaced Rudas), and play in Crucible, Poison the Well and Reggie and the Full Effect, until he became a band manager, representing such artists as Further Seems Forever, The Bled and As Friends Rust's successor, Salem. Moyal quickly asked recently fired ex-Morning Again guitarist and former Bird of Ill Omen band-mate, Joseph Simmons (who had just finished recording Morning Again's As Tradition Dies Slowly), to join both Culture and As Friends Rust (thereby switching places with Looker), and also recruited Hot Water Music's roadie, Kaleb Stewart, as bass guitarist and backing vocalist for As Friends Rust. With an intact line-up, As Friends Rust recorded the song "Home Is Where the Heart Aches" at Goldentone Studios in Gainesville, Florida in late March 1998, with producer Rob McGregor. Stewart invited three close friends, Chuck Ragan, George Rebelo, and Chris Wollard (all members of Hot Water Music), to provide backing vocals on the recording.

"Home Is Where the Heart Aches" was combined with four songs from the band's 1996 recording session ("Encante," "Ruffian," "When People Resort to Name Calling," and "Broken Brain") to make up the band's debut extended play, The Fists of Time, released by Good Life Recordings on compact disc and 10-inch vinyl on July 13, 1998. The cover art for The Fists of Time was painted by Moyal. In April 1998, Tarpley quit both As Friends Rust and Culture simultaneously, leading Moyal to recruit ex-Morning Again bass guitarist and then-guitarist of Bird of Ill Omen (though the band was on hiatus), Peter Bartsocas, as As Friends Rust's new guitarist and co-backing vocalist (Culture would recruit a different bass guitarist, Christopher "Floyd" Beckham, who, several years later, would also join As Friends Rust). With Bartsocas, As Friends Rust quickly wrote two more songs in May 1998, "The First Song on the Tape You Make Her" and the never-released "Some Sort of Radio." In promotion of the new line-up, new songs, and forthcoming debut release, the band embarked on a five-week tour of the United States, spanning from June 15 to July 18, 1998, accompanied by Florida punk rock band Discount and Minnesota pop punk band Dillinger Four. The tour included stops to perform at such festivals as More Than Music in Columbus, Ohio, Tin Can Full of Dreams in Lawrence, Massachusetts, and Wilkes-Barre Festival in Wilkes-Barre, Pennsylvania.

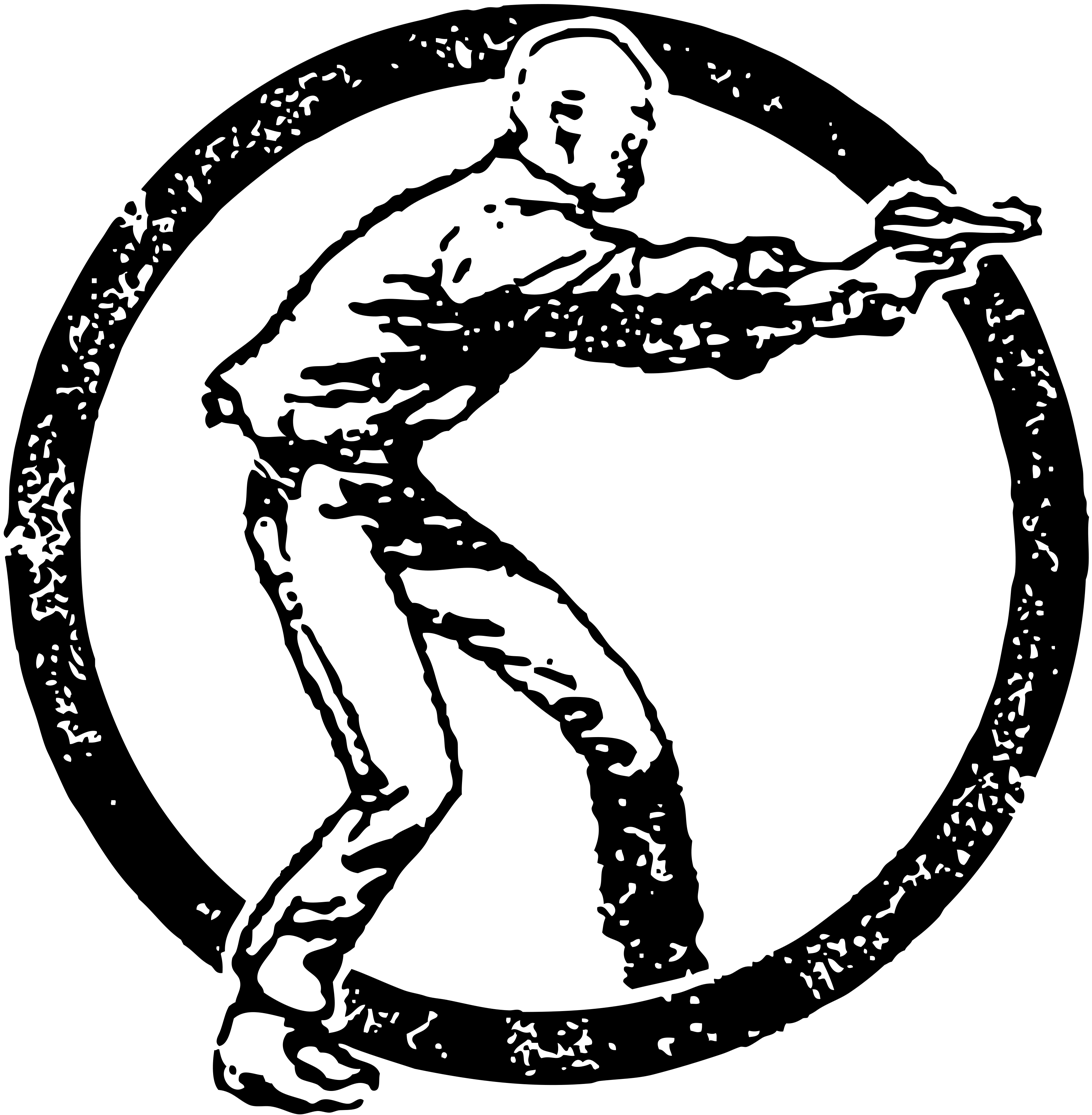
As Friends Rust's "guy with gun" logo, discovered and adapted by Damien Moyal in 1998. The emblem was first used on the As Friends Rust / Discount split and has since appeared on the majority of the band's merchandise.

Following this American tour, As Friends Rust was put on hold for a month as Moyal, Kirkpatrick, and Simmons toured Europe and the United Kingdom with Culture from August 14 to September 13, 1998; the latter band would disband shortly after returning home. After replacing Bartsocas with guitarist James Glayat (who had previously played in Roosevelt with Kirkpatrick) in October 1998, As Friends Rust returned to Goldentone Studios to record "The First Song on the Tape You Make Her" with McGregor; McGregor and local Gainesville musician Keith Welsh provided backing vocals on the recording. The song would appear on a split CD and 7-inch vinyl with Discount, released by Good Life Recordings in December 1998. The release was the first to feature As Friends Rust's new "guy with gun" logo, which Moyal had discovered on a wall while walking through an alleyway in Boston, Massachusetts' Chinatown in early July 1998 (while on tour with Discount). As Friends Rust and Discount embarked on a second tour together, this time travelling around Europe and the United Kingdom from December 3, 1998, to January 11, 1999, accompanied by Swedish hardcore band Purusam.

==== Signing with Doghouse Records and As Friends Rust (1998–1999) ====
As soon as The Fists of Time made its way to American distributor Lumberjack Distribution, As Friends Rust began to be courted by Toledo, Ohio-based record label Doghouse Records (which co-owned Lumberjack Distribution). The record label eventually signed the band to a three-record deal (one extended play and two full-length albums) in late 1998. On May 9, 1999, the band returned to Goldentone Studios to record six songs with McGregor for their Doghouse Records debut. The new material included "Half Friend Town," "Like Strings (Spell It with a K)," "Fire on 8th and 3rd," "Coffee Black," "Scapegoat Wets the Whistle," as well as a cover of Circle Jerks' "Operation" planned for a split 7-inch vinyl with Hot Water Music. The five original songs were released on an eponymous compact disc and 8-inch vinyl by Doghouse Records on September 17, 1999; the European version, released earlier in July 1999 on compact disc and double 7-inch vinyl, was erroneously promoted under the titles God Hour and 6-Song CD by Good Life Recordings (and included "Operation" as a bonus track once the split was cancelled).

As Friends Rust toured the east coast of the United States during three weeks, spanning from June 12 to July 4, 1999, accompanied by Gainesville-based acoustic musician Keith Welsh. The tour included stops to play the Wilkes-Barre Summer Music Festival in Kingston, Pennsylvania and Syracuse Hell Fest in Syracuse, New York. The band quickly followed up with a five-week European and British tour in July and August 1999, playing at such festivals as Good Life Midsummer Hardcore Festival in Kuurne, Belgium, Festival Hardcore in Sant Feliu de Guíxols, Spain, and Ieper Hardcore Festival in Ypres, Belgium. The European and British tour was originally intended to be shared with Hot Water Music, but due to a disagreement over top-billing, the two bands ended up booking separate tours. The incident caused a riff between the two bands that took decades to fully heal and lead As Friends Rust to include the text "Thanks to all of the Gainesville bands that were actually willing to play shows with us. There is division." in the liner notes of their upcoming eponymous extended play; a protesting reference to Hot Water Music's album No Division which was released around the same time. In retaliation, the Hot Water Music side-project band Unitas included a diss track, "Molotodd Cocktail," on its debut album, Porch Life. The disagreement also caused the cancellation of the split 7-inch vinyl of Circle Jerks covers which the two bands had planned to release through Good Life Recordings in promotion of the tour. Hot Water Music ended up booking a separate headlining tour with Discount as a supporting act, while As Friends Rust headlined its own tour, playing a handful of cross-over shows with New Jersey melodic hardcore band Ensign and California melodic hardcore band Ignite.

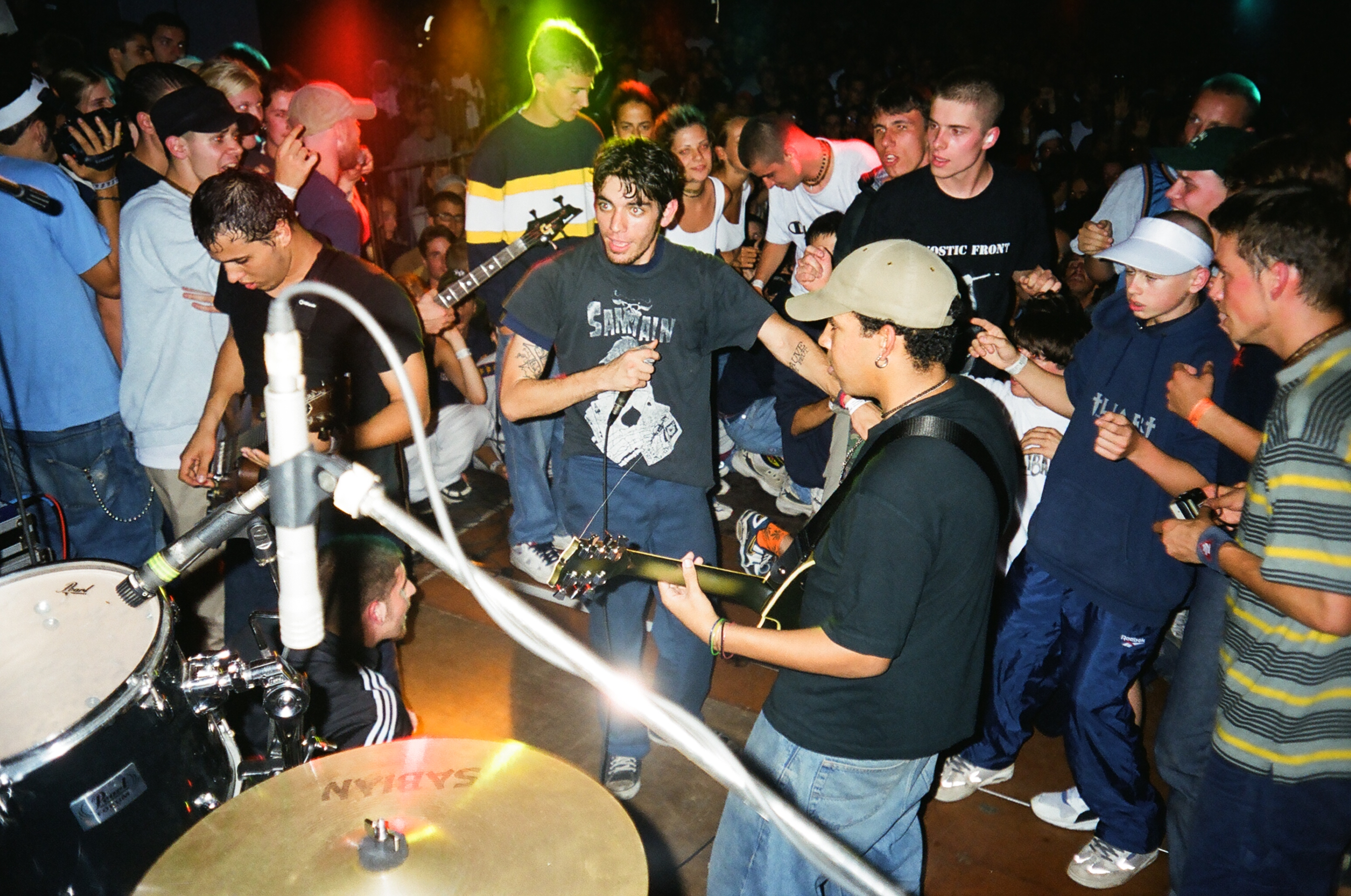
As Friends Rust headlining Ieper Hardcore Festival in Ypres, Belgium on August 20, 1999. From left to right: James Glayat, Kaleb Stewart, Damien Moyal, and Joseph Simmons.

On October 5, 1999, Japanese record label Howling Bull Entertainment released the compact disc compilation Eleven Songs, which included a selection of the band's recorded material from 1996–1999 (though it was technically a licensed edition of As Friends Rust with bonus tracks). As Friends Rust hoped to record a full-length album in late 1999 or early 2000, which was to include the newly written song "Shame on You," performed during the summer 1999 tours, but was unable to compose enough new material. A split 7-inch vinyl with Good Riddance, scheduled for release through Good Life Recordings, was also abandoned due to lack of material. In December 1999, the band played Gainesvillefest in Gainesville, Florida. The festival was intended to be followed by a two-week tour with New York metalcore band The August Prophecy and Florida metalcore band Dragbody, from late December 1999 to mid-January 2000, but As Friends Rust pulled out at the last minute.

==== Continued touring and membership changes (2000) ====
During the first half of 2000, As Friends Rust went on mini-tours with New Jersey hardcore band Fast Times and Washington D.C. hardcore band Good Clean Fun, and also played The Copper Sun Indie Records Winter Festival in Wilkes-Barre, Pennsylvania, Detroit Festival in Eastpointe, Michigan, and Krazy Fest 3 in Louisville, Kentucky. In March 2000, Good Life Recordings announced a long-delayed split 7-inch vinyl between As Friends Rust and Christian metallic hardcore band Disciple. The split, which had been in development since 1998, was scheduled to use the unreleased November 1996 recording of As Friends Rust's "The Only Point," a song with pro-choice lyrics, while Disciple contributed a December 1997 recording of "Candy Apple," a song with pro-life lyrics. However, the split was blocked by ex-As Friends Rust guitarist Olmino, who had since become a pro-life supporter, and opposed the use of the song which he had earlier co-written with Moyal. Another 7-inch vinyl release planned by As Friends Rust during this era was a three-song extended play of fellow Gainesville musician Tom Petty covers. This was scheduled for release through Dim Mak Records, but the songs were never recorded.

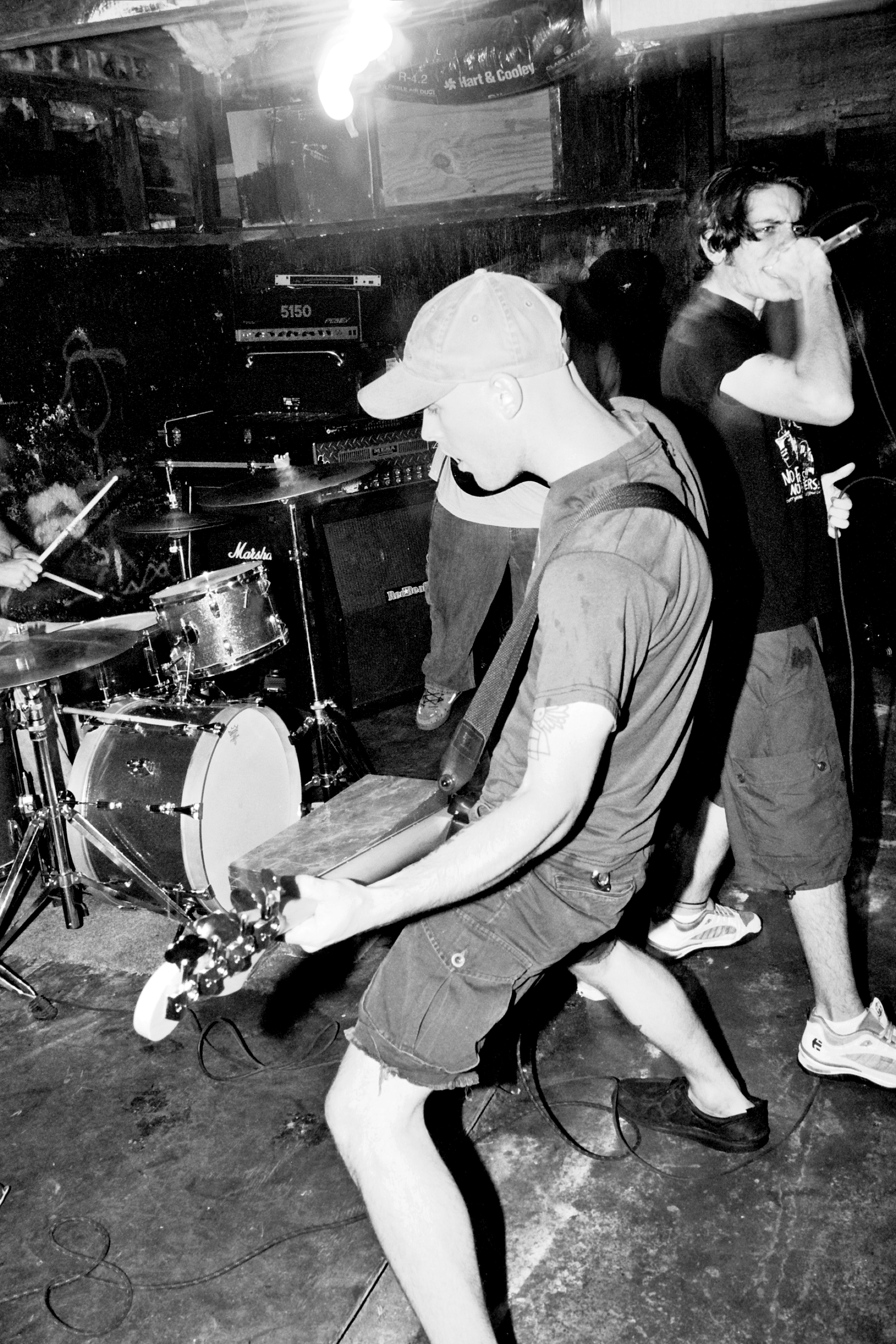
As Friends Rust performing at 33 Tyler Street in Buffalo, New York on June 29, 2000. From left to right: Timothy Kirkpatrick, Kaleb Stewart, Joseph Simmons, and Damien Moyal.

On June 22, 2000, Doghouse Records re-issued The Fists of Time, under the expanded title The Fists of Time: An Anthology of Short Fiction and Non-Fiction, on compact disc, 12-inch vinyl and digitally, adding the songs "The First Song on the Tape You Make Her" and "Operation," which had previously been exclusive to Good Life Recordings and the European market. Unbeknownst to the band, the re-issue did not count towards the existing three-record contract (which counted As Friends Rust as the EP, and two, yet-unfulfilled full-length albums). As Friends Rust immediately embarked on a four-week tour to promote the release, playing shows across the entire United States with Virginia hardcore band Strike Anywhere from June 1–30, 2000. The tour included several cross-over shows with Florida post-hardcore band Glasseater, Pennsylvania emo band Mid Carson July, and Florida emo band The Agency (the three of which were on a separate tour together), as well as stops to play at such festivals as Mixed Messages in Minneapolis, Minnesota, Pheer Festival in College Park, Maryland, and Hellfest 2K in Auburn, New York (the last of which As Friends Rust did not play due to a last-minute change in venue).

In July 2000, Good Life Recordings invited As Friends Rust back to Europe for a week's worth of shows in Belgium and the Netherlands, including a performance at Dour Festival in Dour, Belgium and Metropolis Festival in Rotterdam, Netherlands. A month later, the band returned to Europe and the United Kingdom for a full five-week tour, spanning from August 17 to September 25, 2000, which included a handful of cross-over shows with Canadian melodic hardcore band Grade, New Jersey melodic hardcore band Ensign, and Massachusetts post-hardcore band Garrison. This European and British tour also included stops to play the Ieper Hardcore Festival in Ypres, Belgium, TurboPunk Festival, in Poznań, Poland, Transmitter Festival in Hohenems, Austria, and Complete MADness Festival (organized by MAD Tour Booking) in Potsdam, Germany. The band again planned to work on a full-length album in late 2000, having written a handful of new songs, including "Tuesday Clad" and "Watch It Fall," described by Moyal as "calmer and more depressing," but this material was eventually abandoned due to line-up changes.

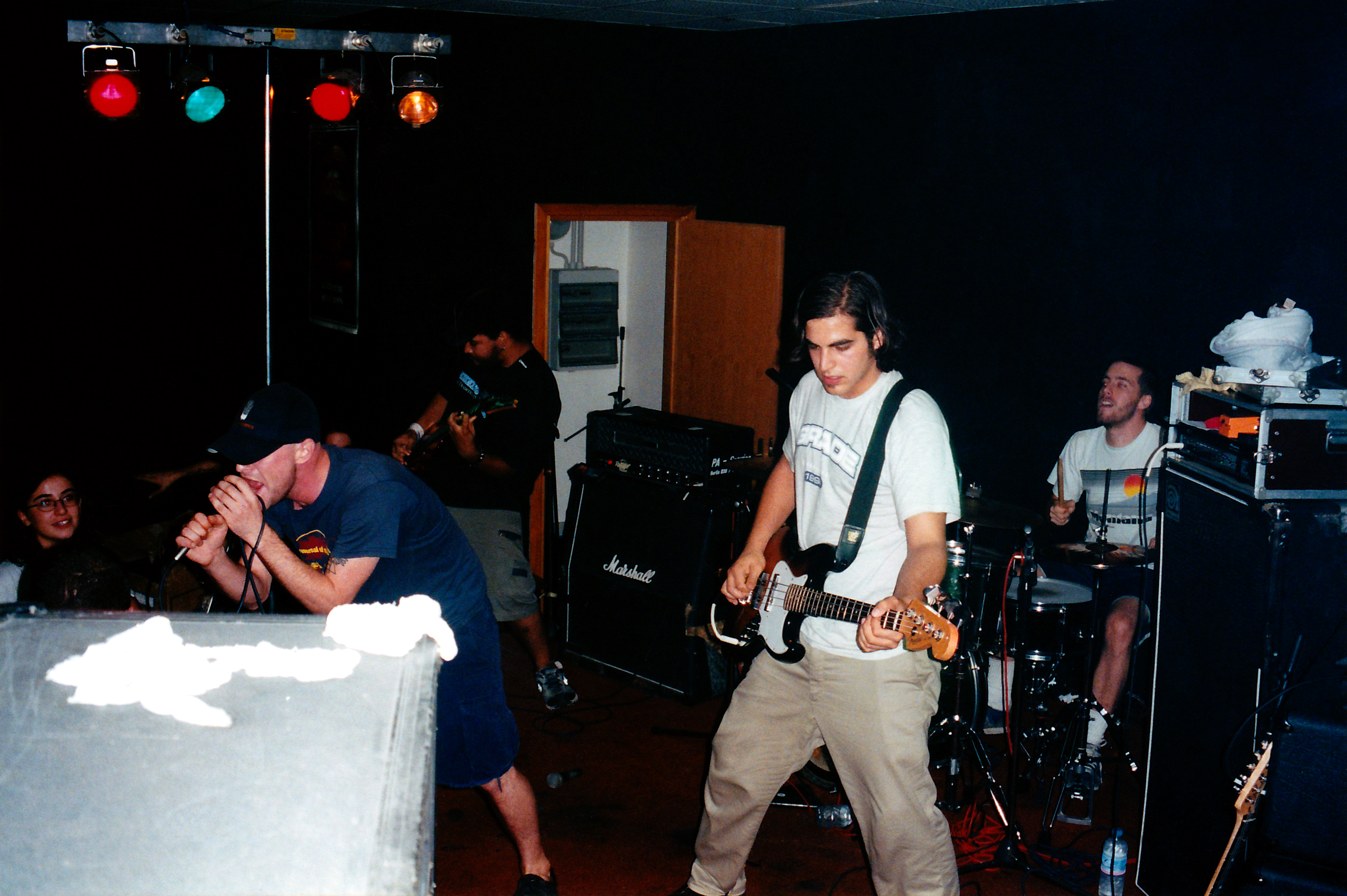
As Friends Rust performing at Plan 9 in Limena, Italy on September 16, 2000. One of the few shows when Kaleb Stewart took up lead vocals while Damien Moyal was sick. From left to right: Stewart, Joseph Simmons, Peter Bartsocas, and Timothy Kirkpatrick.

Prior to leaving for Europe and the United Kingdom in August 2000, Glayat and Kirkpatrick announced their desire to leave the band upon returning home. However, tensions during the tour and health issues ultimately caused a much bigger change in membership. On the way to Ieper Hardcore Festival, less than a week into the tour, the band was involved in a motor vehicle accident in Belgium, which badly damaged the touring van and resulted with Glayat suffering torn ligaments in his leg (and several other members enduring injuries and stitches). With Glayat wearing a splint, the band continued on to half a week's worth of shows in the United Kingdom, following which the injured guitarist opted to fly home to Florida instead of crossing back into Europe for the remaining four weeks of touring.

Ex-guitarist Bartsocas, who was visiting Europe at the same time and had been travelling with the band, filled the vacant guitarist position for the next four weeks of shows. Three weeks later, Moyal suffered from laryngitis and lost his voice, leading Stewart to switch from bass guitar and backing vocals to lead vocals, and Bartsocas temporarily filling in as bass guitarist (Simmons serving as sole guitarist). Not wanting to let the band deteriorate, Moyal and Simmons called ex-Culture, ex-Morning Again, and ex-Crucible bass guitarist Christopher "Floyd" Beckham (Glayat's at-the-time roommate) from Europe, asking him to join As Friends Rust as its new guitarist upon returning home, much to Stewart's dismay, leading the latter to quit the band. Moyal and Stewart were initially to stay in Europe following As Friends Rust's tour for a second tour with their side-project band, Bridgeburne R, but Moyal was forced to find a new bass guitarist for both bands. Glayat and Kirkpatrick went on to play in Moments in Grace, while Stewart joined The Sheryl Cro(w) Mags and started Grey Goose.

=== Won (2001) ===
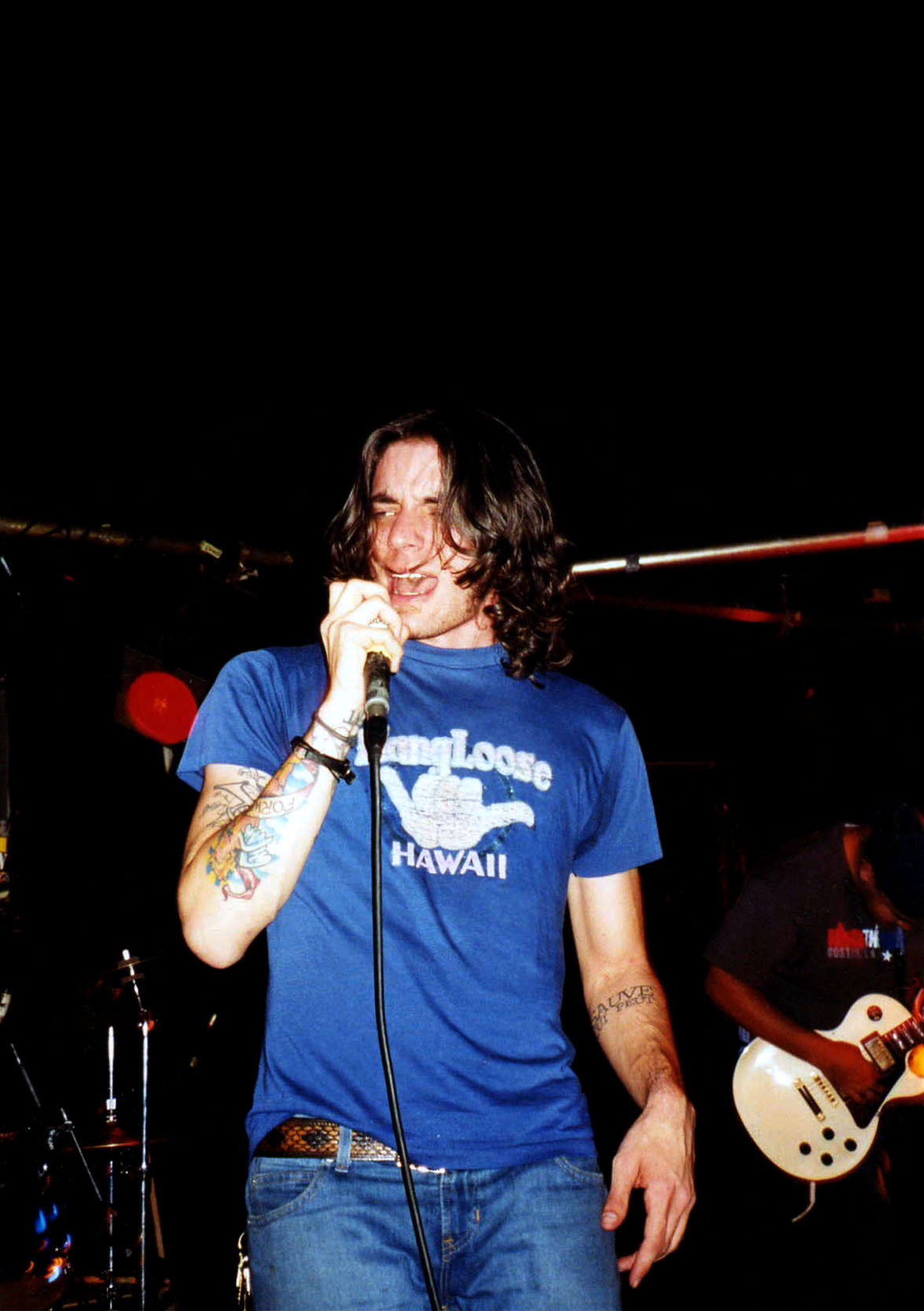
As Friends Rust performing at Underground in Cologne, Germany in promotion of Won on November 4, 2001. From left to right: Damien Moyal and Joseph Simmons.

In February 2001, Moyal, Simmons, and Beckham recruited former Twelve Tribes drummer Alexander Vernon (who had relocated from Ohio to Florida to play with metalcore band Red Roses for a Blue Lady), and future Rehasher bass guitarist Guillermo Amador. This line-up wrote and recorded two songs, "Morningleaver" and "This Is Me Hating You," at Goldentone Studios with McGregor in late February 2001, both of which were released as Morningleaver / This Is Me Hating You by Doghouse Records as part of its 7-inch vinyl Fan Series in March 2001. Further line-up changes resulted with Zachary Swain (formerly of Rosalind, Adversary, and Carlisle) replacing Vernon on drums in March 2001, and Thomas Rankine (formerly of Crestfallen, Bird of Ill Omen, Dead Men's Theory, Anchorman, and Crucible) replacing Amador on bass guitar in April 2001. Within four months, the band had written enough new songs for a full-length album.

As Friends Rust recorded ten songs for its debut full-length, Won, in July 2001, with producer James Paul Wisner at Wisner Productions. Recorded material included new versions of "Morningleaver" and "This Is Me Hating You," newly written songs "We on Some Next Level Shit," "Fourteen or So," "Austin, We Have a Problem," "Won't Be the First Time," "Perfect Stranglers," "Laughing Out Loud," and "Last Call," as well as "Ten" for which Moyal improvised lyrics in the studio. Former As Friends Rust drummer Matthew Crum contributed additional percussion, while backing vocals were provided by Beckham and Further Seems Forever bass guitarist Chad Neptune. Won's release was delayed by several months, ultimately coming out on October 5, 2001, in Japan through Howling Bull Entertainment, on October 15, 2001, in Europe through German record label Defiance Records, and on October 23, 2001, in the United States through Doghouse Records.

The band began touring full-time in support of Won, starting with an American summer tour with Vangard, Keepsake, and Further Seems Forever from early August to mid-September 2001. The last leg of the American tour was cut short due to the September 11 attacks in New York City (As Friends Rust was scheduled to play the city three days later), but the band managed to perform at the Orlando Magicfest in Orlando, Florida, Furnace Fest in Birmingham, Alabama, and Philly Music Festival in Philadelphia, Pennsylvania. Another North American tour with Where Fear and Weapons Meet was initially booked for October to December 2001, but was cancelled when Where Fear and Weapons Meet's original vocalist quit and the band announced its breakup (though the band would ultimately reform a year later).

As Friends Rust then reunited with Strike Anywhere for a five-week European and British tour from late October to early December 2001, supported by Planes Mistaken for Stars during the first leg and Durango 95 for most of the European shows. In promotion of these shows, British record label Golf Records reissued the band's earlier compilation album, Eleven Songs, on compact disc on October 22, 2001. A highlight performance at London, England's Camden Underworld from November 16, 2001, was filmed and later released on video and DVD by British home video company Punkervision on December 17, 2002. The chemistry shared between As Friends Rust and Strike Anywhere on tour also gave talk to releasing a split single by the two bands, but it never materialized. As Friends Rust played its last show of 2001 at Gainesvillefest in Gainesville, Florida.

=== Moyal's departure and transition into Salem (2002) ===
==== Recording A Young Trophy Band in the Parlance of Our Times ====
In mid-February 2002, As Friends Rust recorded five songs ("More Than Just Music, It's a Hairstyle," "The Most Americanest," "Temporary Living," "Born With a Silver Spoon Up Your Ass," and "Where the Wild Things Were") at Wisner Productions with producer James Paul Wisner, as part of a one-off loan-out to Equal Vision Records. Tension within the band resulted with Moyal recording his vocals separately and co-producing the material without the other four members' presence. During his studio session, Moyal recorded a guitar and vocal interlude titled "Up and Went" (with Wisner contributing additional guitar and synthesizer), which he later pointed out as a precursor to his solo project, Damien Done.

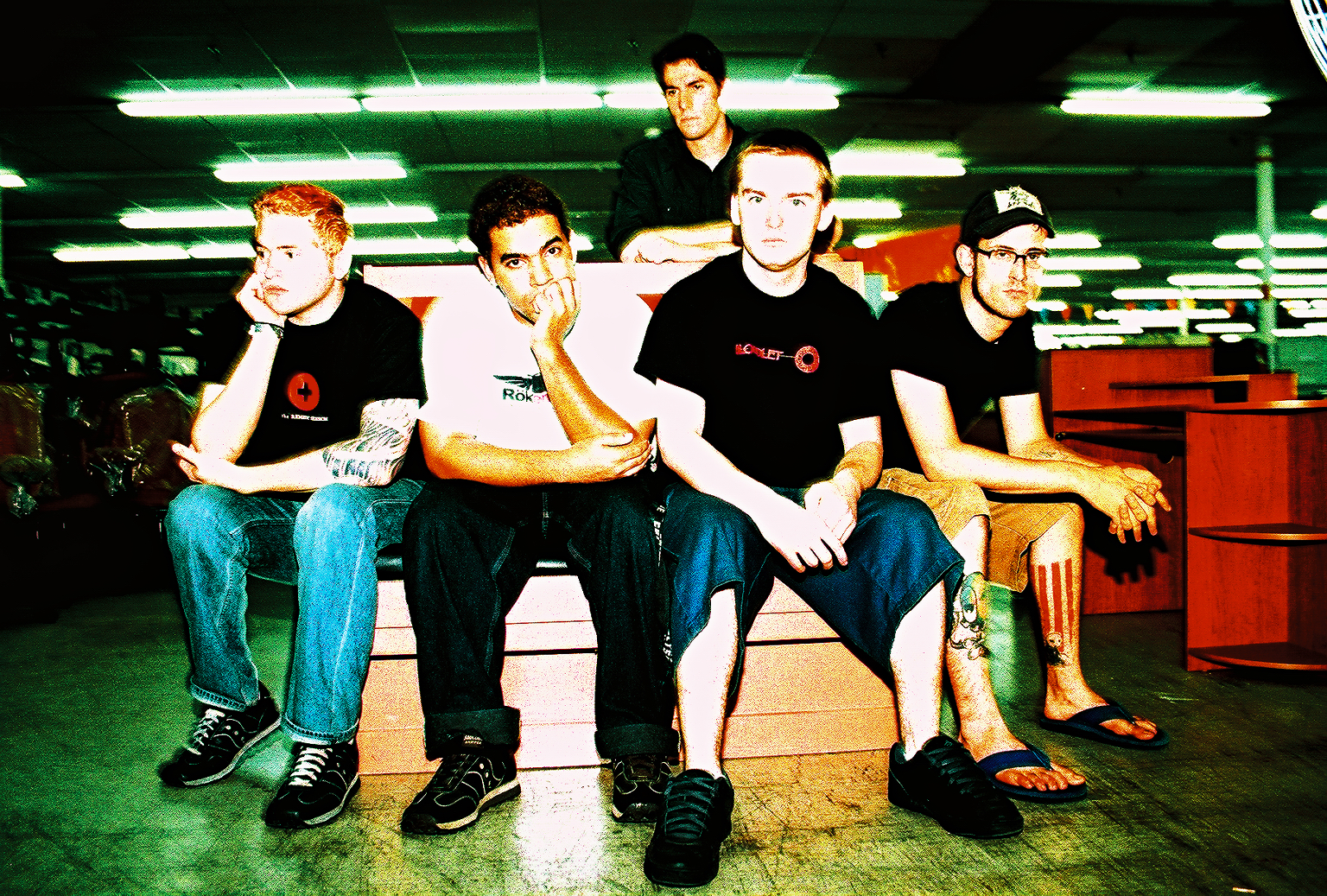
Promotional picture of As Friends Rust circa May 2002. From left to right: Thomas Rankine, Joseph Simmons, Adam D'Zurilla (top), Zachary Swain, and Christopher Beckham.

Less than two weeks after the recording session, Moyal quit As Friends Rust, citing dissatisfaction with touring and wanting to focus on school and his then-girlfriend. In retrospective interviews, Moyal reflected that the new members (Beckham, Swain, and Rankine) were taking As Friends Rust in a more mainstream and polished direction, which in turn led to his loss of interest.

In an interview conducted shortly after Moyal's departure, Rankine revealed that frictions with the vocalist had become increasingly problematic, especially since the band's European and British tour from October–December 2001. Rankine voiced that Moyal's attitude had been negative and holding back the band from progressing in a natural direction, and yet, by quitting suddenly, he had left the band in a precarious situation with record label and touring obligations to fulfill (for both Won and the forthcoming A Young Trophy Band in the Parlance of Our Times). At the time of Moyal's departure, As Friends Rust already had several upcoming shows scheduled and was in the midst of booking an entire year's worth of tours. The band was also talking about writing a second full-length album (to fulfill its Doghouse Records contract), and was being courted by larger record labels, including Victory Records. Moyal, nevertheless, encouraged the band to find a new vocalist and continue under the established name. The vocalist went on to form Damien Done, a solo project which eventually expanded into a full band.

==== Touring for Won and A Young Trophy Band in the Parlance of Our Times ====
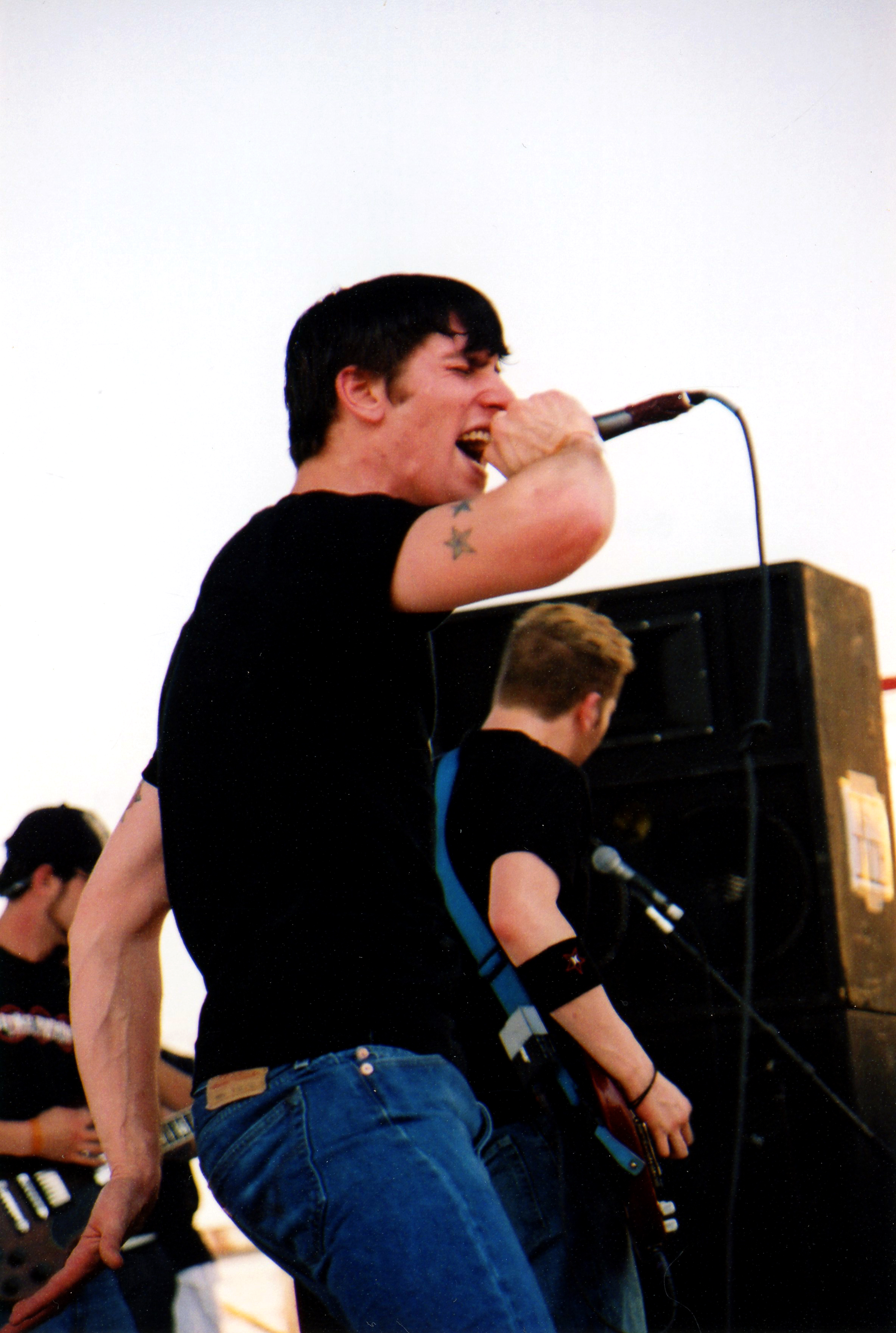
As Friends Rust performing at Krazy Fest 5 in Louisville, Kentucky on June 22, 2002. Adam D'Zurilla (front) replaced Damien Moyal as lead vocalist in March 2002. Also pictured Christopher Beckham (left) and Thomas Rankine (right).

Beckham initially stepped up as temporary lead vocalist, and Tarpley returned to fill the vacant guitarist position, as the band embarked on a short Midwest tour supporting Sick of It All, Shai Hulud, and Thursday during the first week of March 2002. This was immediately followed by a week-long east coast tour with This Day Forward, Coheed and Cambria, The Stryder, Fairweather, Liars Academy, and Prevent Falls as part of the Equal Vision Records Presents: Spring Showcase 2002 Tour, and a one-off date opening for Agnostic Front on Long Island, New York.

Adam D'Zurilla (formerly of Short Order, Esteem, Die Tomorrow, and Kumité) was finally welcomed as Moyal's replacement in late March 2002, allowing Beckham to return to playing guitar and providing backing vocals. D'Zurilla's first show was the Hell City Tattoo Festival in Columbus, Ohio on April 5, 2002, followed by a week-long east coast tour with Bloodlet and Hotwire, and a performance at Gorefest in Miami, Florida. A couple weeks' worth of shows were planned for mid-May 2002, with Gainesville punk rock band House on Fire and Texas emo band Pop Unknown, but most of the dates fell through and As Friends Rust ended up playing a series of one-off shows across the Southern United States. In the last week of May 2002, As Friends Rust supported Prevent Falls and Whippersnapper for a string of Florida shows.

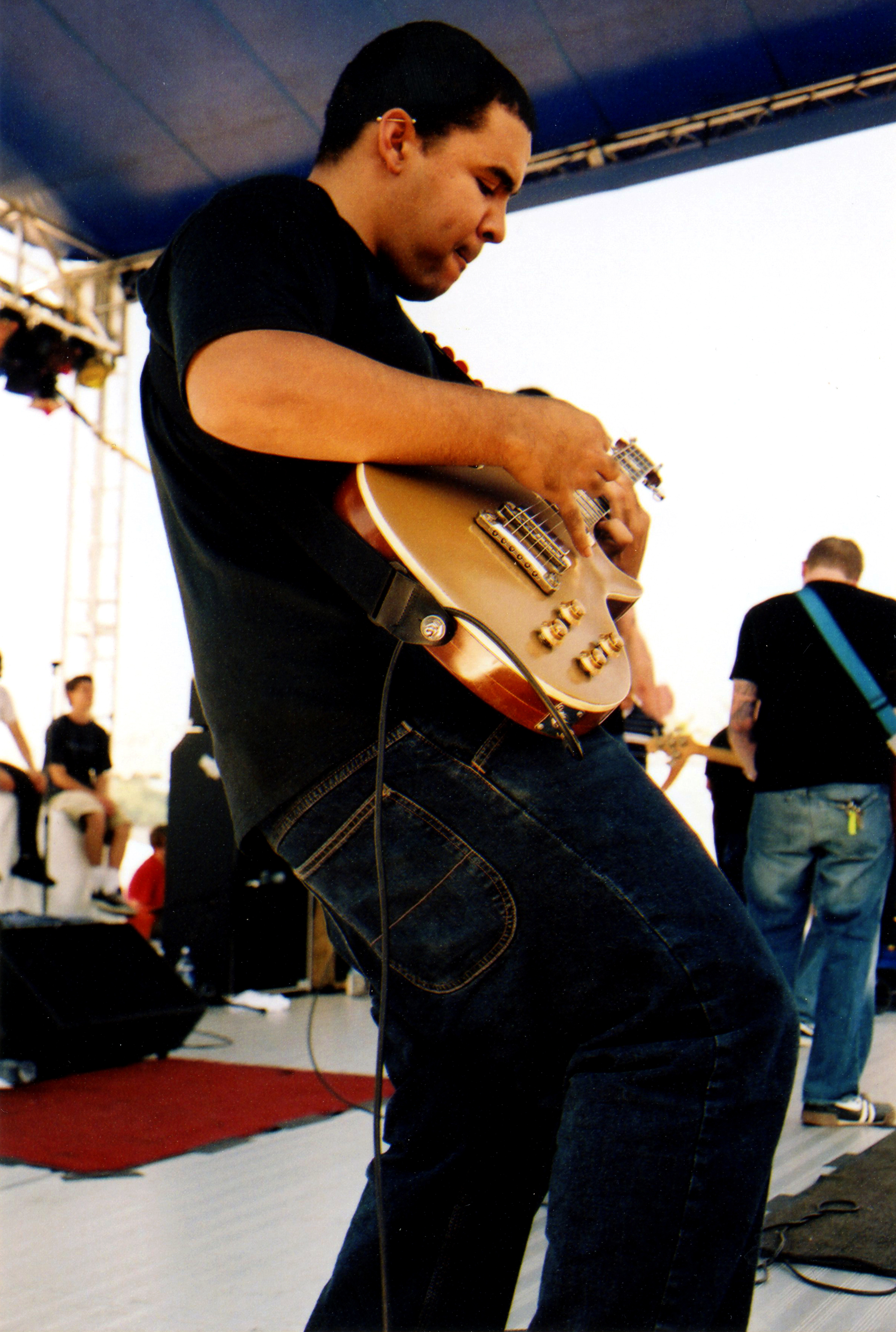
As Friends Rust performing at Krazy Fest 5 in Louisville, Kentucky on June 22, 2002. Joseph Simmons (front) remained as sole guitarist for the band's 2002 European and British tour. Also pictured Thomas Rankine (right).

The final recordings with Moyal were released on the extended play A Young Trophy Band in the Parlance of Our Times on compact disc and 12-inch vinyl on May 27, 2002, through Defiance Records in Europe, and on May 28, 2002, through Equal Vision Records in the United States. The band immediately hit the road non-stop for the next six months, beginning with a two-week Canadian tour in early June 2002, followed by a month and a half-long American tour with Prevent Falls, Garrison, and Clark, spanning from mid-June to late July 2002. During this tour, As Friends Rust played Krazy Fest 5 in Louisville, Kentucky, and three Van's Warped Tour dates in Los Angeles and San Francisco, California. Upon returning home in late July 2002, Beckham quit the band; he went on to play in the punk rock band J. Page.

As Friends Rust travelled as a four-piece, with Simmons as sole guitarist, for its month-long European and British tour, which spanned from early August to early September 2002. The tour included dates at the Defiance Records Festival in Cologne, Germany, the Sommerspektakel Open Air Festival in Sarstedt, Germany, and Ieperfest in Ypres, Belgium. The band was supported by The Copperpot Journals on its ten-date United Kingdom leg.

Prior to leaving for Europe, the band had already discussed abandoning the name As Friends Rust in favor of one that better reflected its new musical direction. It was while on this European and British tour that announcements were made to fans that this would be As Friends Rust's final tour, and that the band would be officially changing its name to Salem upon returning home. Although As Friends Rust officially played its last show on September 11, 2002, in Amsterdam, Netherlands, the band continued to be billed under its old name, as additional tours had been booked well-in-advance for the remainder of 2002. As such, Salem continued to play As Friends Rust songs and tour in promotion of Won and A Young Trophy Band in the Parlance of Our Times for several more months.

Back in the United States, the band was supposed to go on tour with Florida emo band The Remedy Session, from mid-September to early October 2002, but the tour was cancelled. Salem officially played its first show on September 28, 2002, at The Factory in Fort Lauderdale, Florida, opening for Further Seems Forever, though the band was billed as As Friends Rust. Salem was again billed as As Friends Rust during its week-long south-eastern American tour with Fairweather, Liars Academy, Open Hand, and Codeseven, and during another week-long south-eastern American tour with Shelter, Keepsake, and Running from Dharma, which together spanned most of mid-October 2002. It was only once touring began with The Movielife, Brand New, and The Reunion Show in late October 2002, that the previously booked billing was corrected to feature the band's new name. Upon returning home from this tour in mid-November 2002, Swain quit the band and Salem properly began moving onto new things away from As Friends Rust.

=== Reunion (2008–2019) ===
As Friends Rust's first reunion show at The Atlantic in Gainesville, Florida on August 15, 2008.

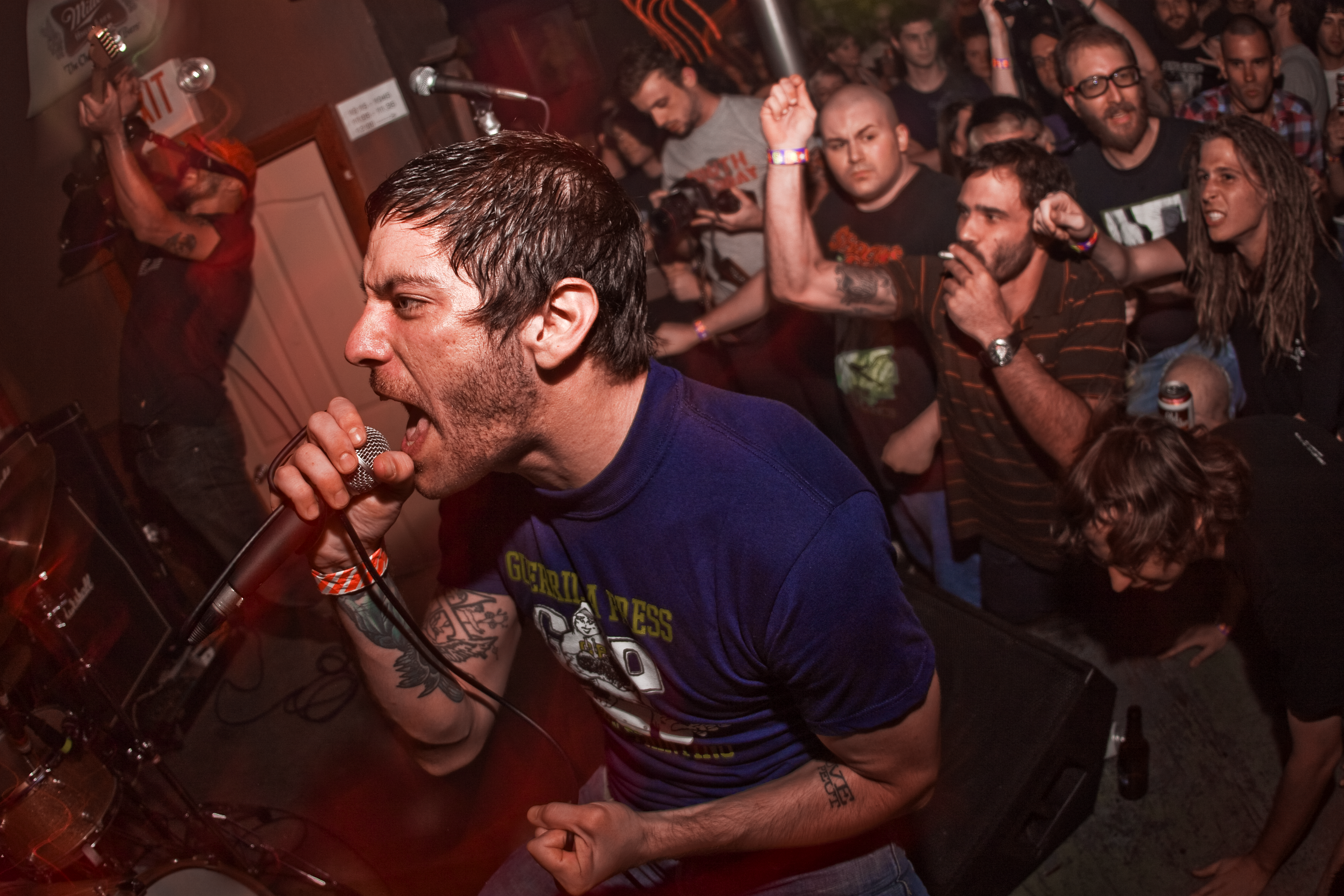
Damien Moyal

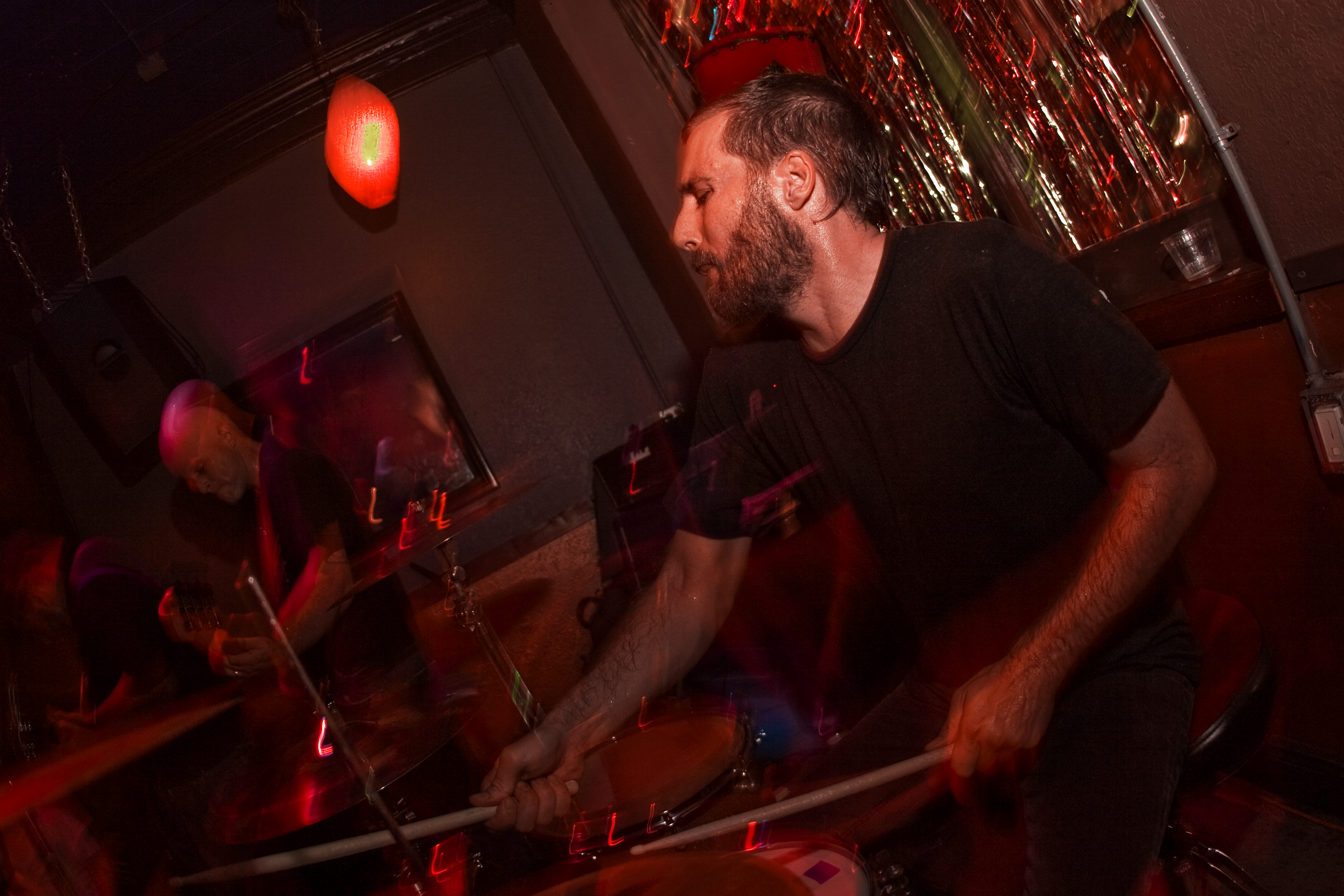
Timothy Kirkpatrick

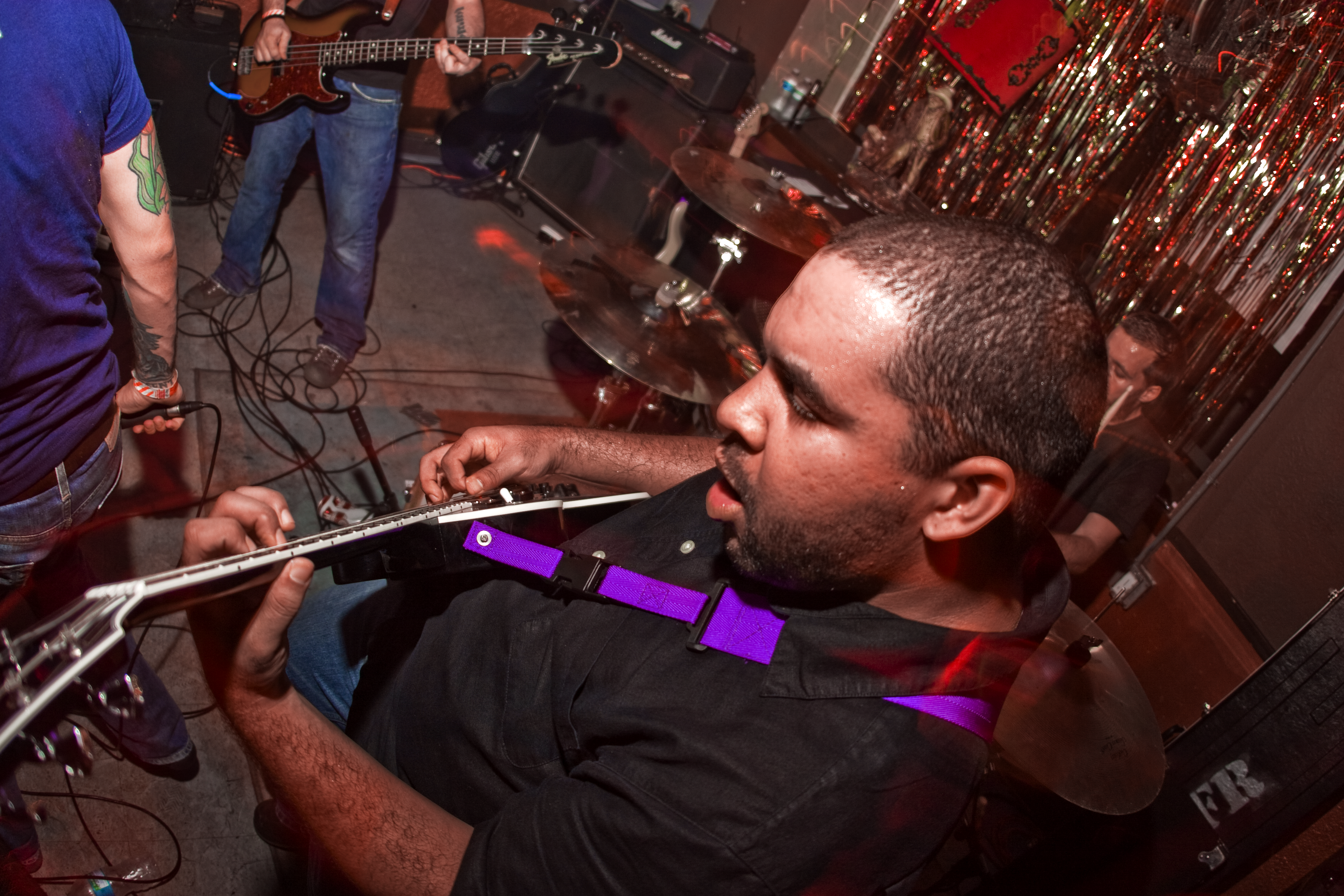
Joseph Simmons

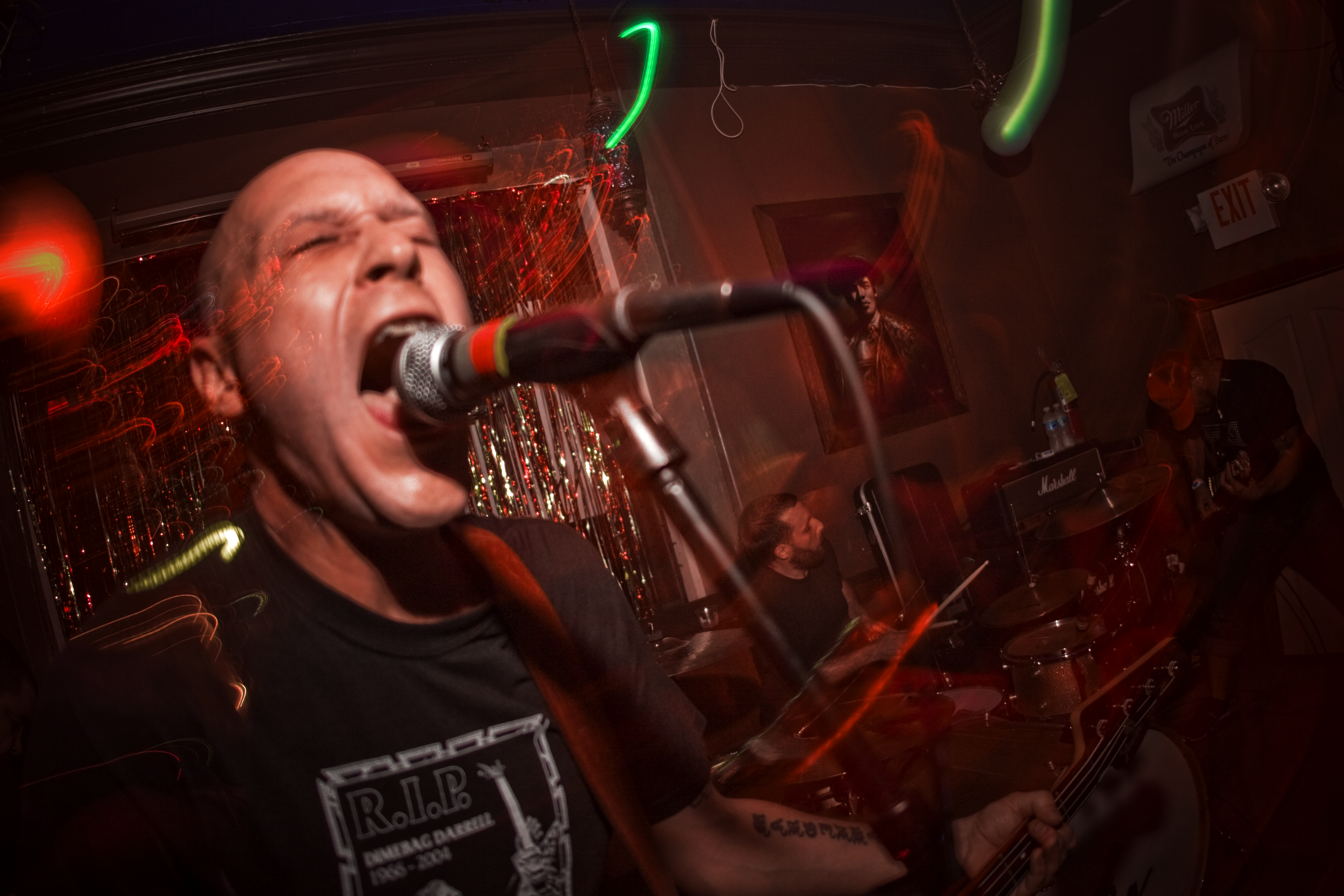
Kaleb Stewart

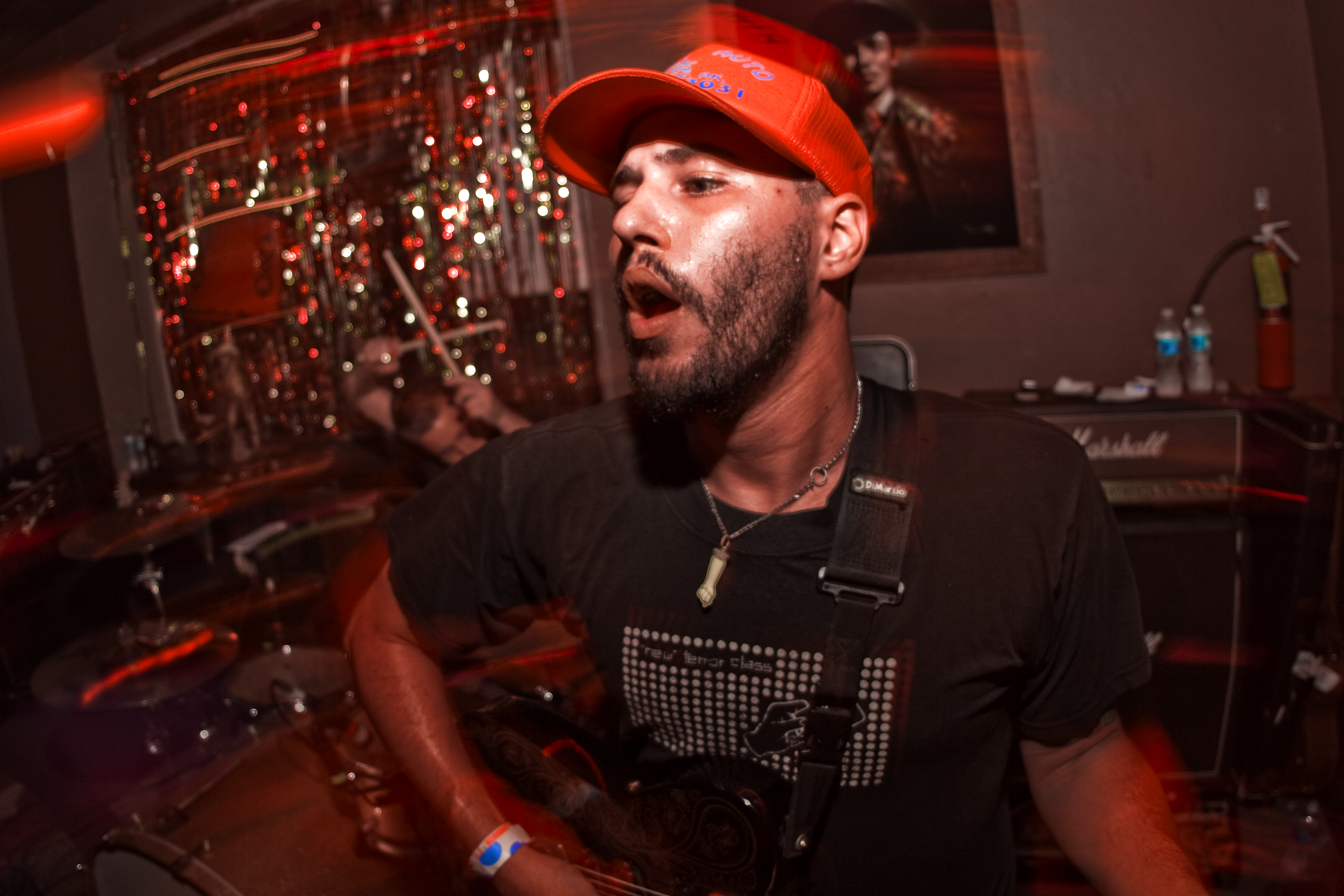
James Glayat

In March 2008, Moyal announced that As Friends Rust would reunite for a series of European and British shows as part of the band's Back in Coffee Black Tour '08. It was further revealed that the band would be performing with its 1998–2000 line-up (referred to as "The Porch Days" line-up), including Kirkpatrick, Simmons, Stewart, and Glayat. At the time, Simmons and Stewart were still living in Gainesville, Florida, but Moyal had relocated to Ann Arbor, Michigan in September 2006, Kirkpatrick had been living in Los Angeles, California since January 2005, and Glayat had been based in Brooklyn, New York since August 2002.

The Back in Coffee Black Tour '08 kicked off with a single American show at The Atlantic in Gainesville, Florida (a venue co-owned by Simmons and Rankine), on August 15, 2008. Three days later, the band flew to the United Kingdom and Europe for six shows spanning August 18–23, 2008. The reunion tour included concerts at the Camden Underworld in London, England, Conne Island in Leipzig, Germany, and Ieperfest in Ypres, Belgium. Due to a passport issue, Glayat was unable to travel with the band on its initial flight to England, so the band played its Camden Underworld show as a four-piece, with Simmons as sole guitarist.

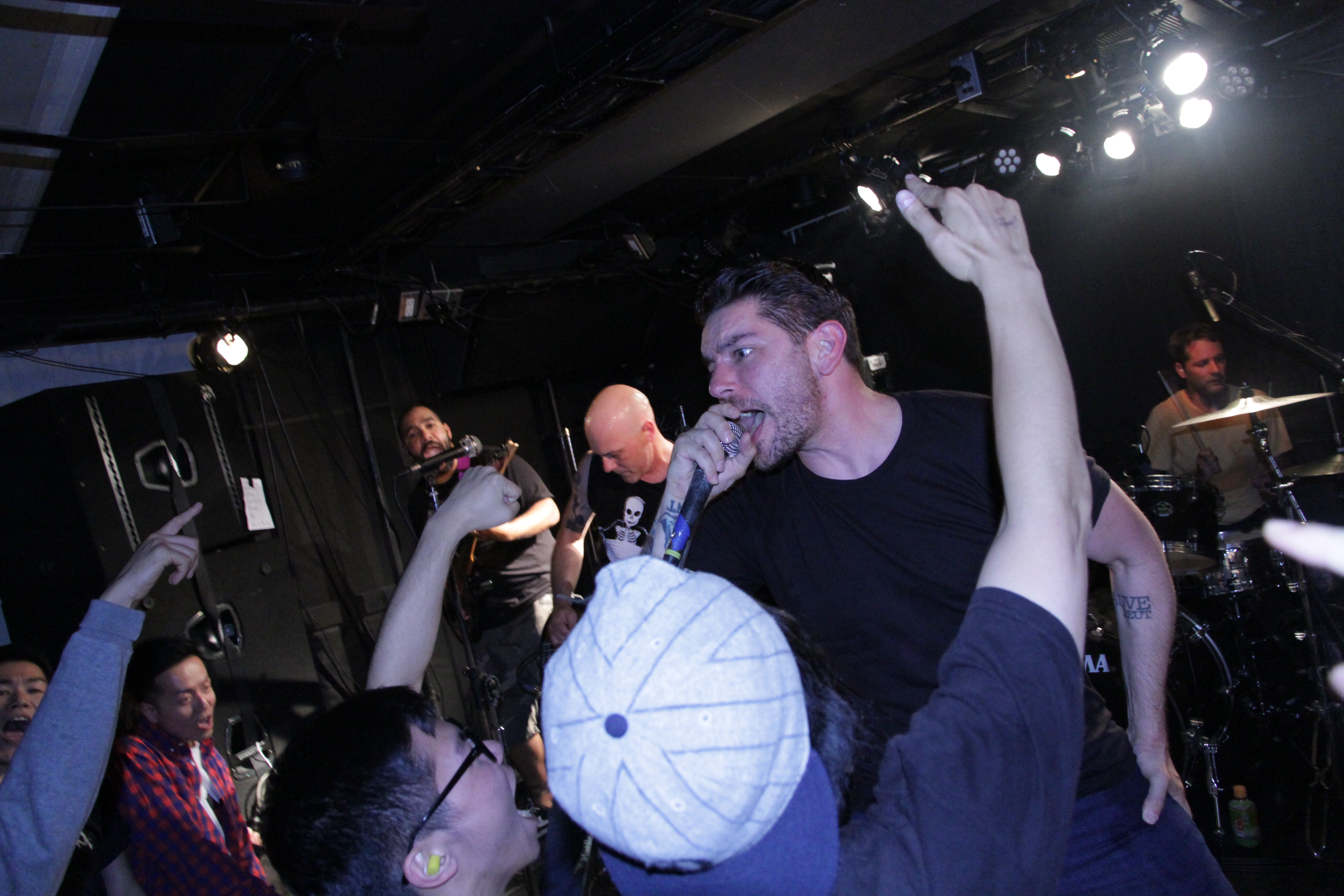
As Friends Rust performing at Shinjuku Nine Spices in Tokyo, Japan on June 12, 2014, as part of the Japan Tour 2014 in promotion of Greatest Hits?. One of only four shows played with drummer Joshua Williams. From left to right: Joseph Simmons, Kaleb Stewart, Damien Moyal, and Williams.

On April 24, 2011, As Friends Rust social media accounts were created on Facebook and Twitter (an official Myspace profile had previously been created on December 29, 2005). On June 6, 2011, As Friends Rust recorded demos of six new songs; although news leaked that an extended play was on the horizon, the band was not satisfied with the result and ultimately shelved the material. The band continued writing more material over the next several years.

As Friends Rust travelled to Asia for the Japan Tour 2014, which spanned from June 12–15, 2014, supported by Japanese hardcore bands Endzweck, Noy, and Nervous Light of Sunday. As Kirkpatrick was unable to tour, he was temporarily replaced by former Culture drummer Joshua Williams (Williams would join Morning Again two months later, and eventually played in the hardcore band On Bodies with Moyal). In promotion of the tour, the band created an Instagram account and Japanese record label Cosmic Note released a best-of compilation album on compact disc, titled Greatest Hits?, on June 4, 2014. The release included a selection of the band's recordings from 1996–2002, hand-picked by Moyal. The compilation was also released on compact cassette by Indonesian record label D'Kolektif on December 27, 2014, and on 12-inch vinyl and compact disc by Dutch record label Shield Recordings on April 29, 2015.

As Friends Rust played three shows in 2015: the first at the Saint Vitus in Brooklyn, New York on April 30, 2015 (during which Bartsocas joined the band to play a song); the second at Groezrock festival in Meerhout, Belgium on May 2, 2015; and the last at The Wooly as part of The Fest 14 in Gainesville, Florida on October 31, 2015. On May 22, 2015, German record label Demons Run Amok Entertainment released The Porch Days: 1998 to 2000 on 12-inch vinyl. The release compiled all of the band's studio recordings from 1998–2000, as well as previously unreleased live recordings of two songs ("Shame on You" and "Tuesday Clad") never recorded in the studio by the band with that line-up.

=== Up from the Muck, Any Joy, and Lightless (2019–present) ===
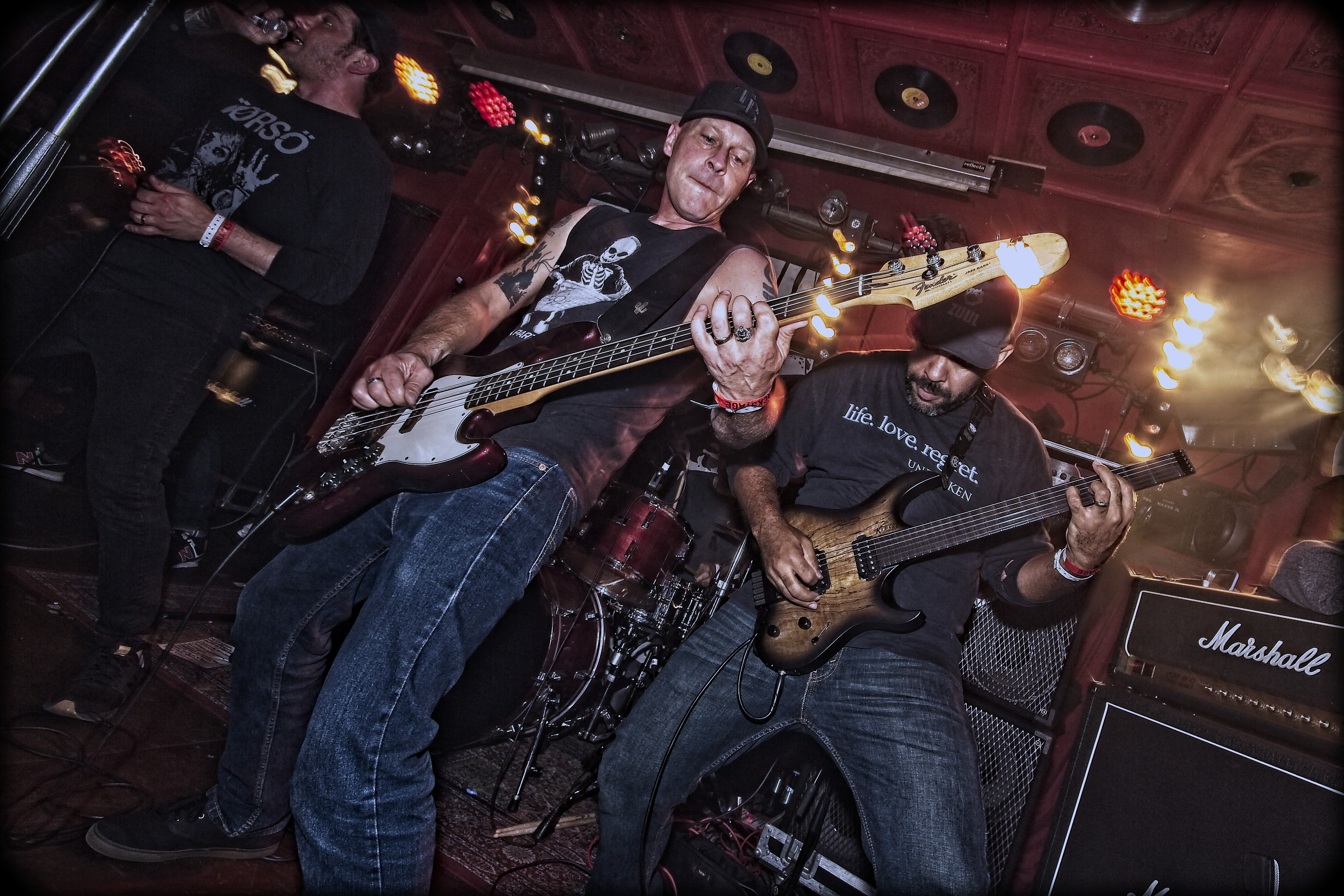
As Friends Rust performing at Booze Cruise Festival in Hamburg, Germany on June 8, 2019; the band's last show with bass guitarist and backing vocalist Kaleb Stewart. From left to right: Damien Moyal, Kaleb Stewart, and Joseph Simmons.

In January 2019, As Friends Rust announced that it had been actively writing and demoing new songs for its second full-length album since 2011, and that its songwriters were finally proud of and happy enough with the current material for it to be properly recorded and released. Kirkpatrick had since moved to St. Augustine, Florida in 2018, and with three members living in Florida, the logistics of getting together to record material became more feasible. Moyal also announced that the band would be recording and releasing a two-song extended play in mid-2019 (though this was ultimately delayed by a year), as a precursor to the band's sophomore album.

As Friends Rust performed three shows in 2019: one at The Kingsland in Brooklyn, New York on April 25, 2019, and two on the same day, on June 8, 2019, at the Molotow Musik Club in Hamburg, Germany, as part of the Booze Cruise Festival. Upon returning from Booze Cruise, As Friends Rust parted ways with Stewart, though the band did not immediately look for a replacement bass guitarist.

The band recorded two songs, "Up from the Muck" and "Last of the Famous International Scumbags," for its planned comeback extended play in early March 2020. The recording sessions were tracked individually at various studios in Florida and New York: Kirkpatrick recorded his drum tracks at Warhouse Studio in Gainesville, Florida; Simmons recorded his guitar tracks at his home studio, Jazzberry Jam Audio, in Tampa, Florida; Glayat recorded his guitar tracks at Tall Pine in Brooklyn, New York (engineered by Bartsocas); and Moyal recorded his vocal tracks at Wisner Productions in St. Cloud, Florida (Wisner having since relocated from Davie, Florida). The songs feature bass guitarist Chad Darby (who also plays in Samiam and Ship Thieves), who recorded his tracks at his home studio in Gainesville, Florida. The songs were then mixed by James Paul Wisner at Wisner Productions.

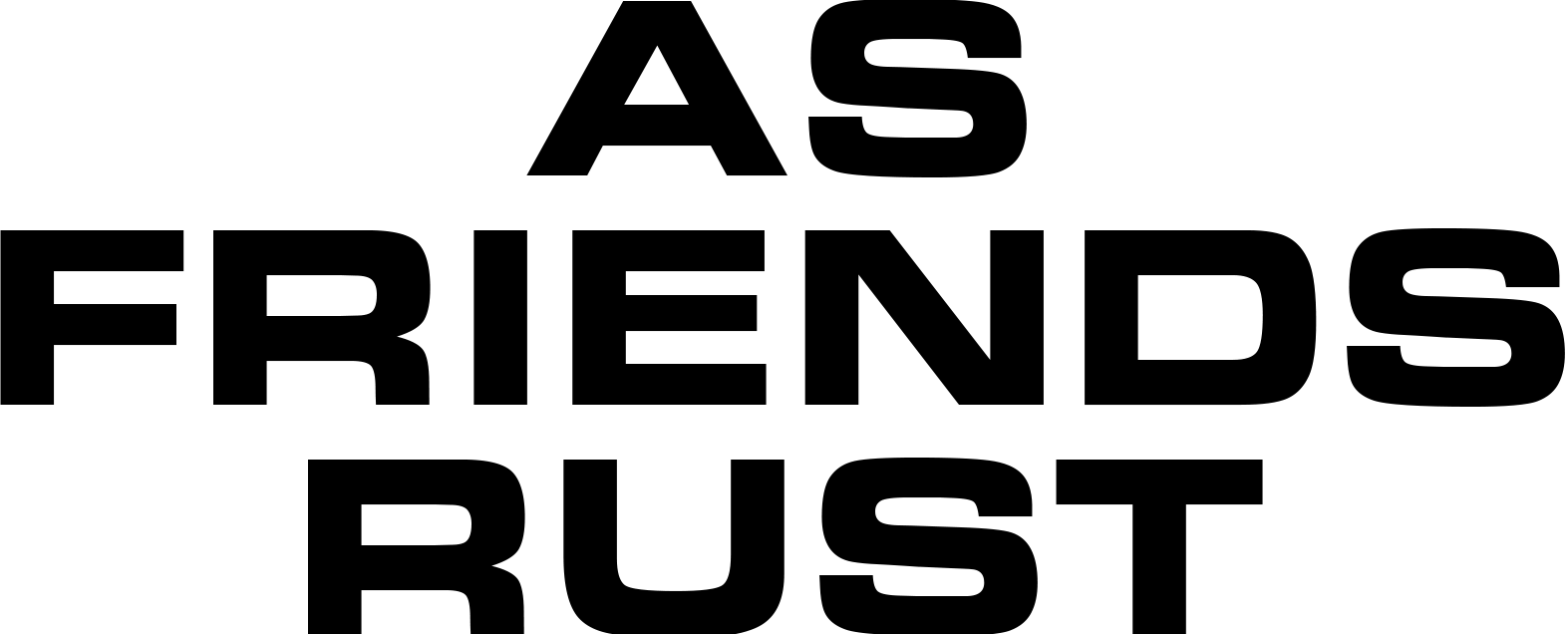
As Friends Rust's logo designed by Damien Moyal in promotion of the band's second full-length album, Any Joy, in 2023.

"Up from the Muck" premiered digitally on March 23, 2020, while "Last of the Famous International Scumbags" premiered digitally a week later on March 30, 2020. Both songs were released on a 7-inch vinyl by Unity Worldwide Records on July 3, 2020, and on a cassette tape by Stick to the Core on May 1, 2023. "Up from the Muck" was also included on the Moyal-produced Various Artists compilation, Peace Is Earned: A Benefit Compilation for Black Lives Matter, released on June 6, 2020. Both songs were later included as bonus tracks on the compact disc edition of Any Joy in 2023.

In January 2020, it was announced that As Friends Rust would perform at Furnace Fest in Birmingham, Alabama on September 20, 2020, though the festival was ultimately cancelled in June 2020, due to the COVID-19 pandemic. As Friends Rust was re-booked to perform at the next year's edition, and set to play on September 26, 2021, but the band cancelled its appearance due to the prolonged pandemic. The band was again re-booked for the 2022 edition. In a September 2021 interview, Moyal noted that the band was still working on its planned second full-length album. He also explained that there had been interest in celebrating the 20th anniversary of Won in 2021, but that due to last-minute planning, the celebration had been postponed to the album's 25th anniversary in 2026. During the COVID-19 pandemic, the band recorded the song "Laughing Out Loud (Quarantine Acoustic Version)," which was released exclusively on the Various Artists compilation Strength Thru Unity: A Conne Island Benefit Compilation, through Unity Worldwide Records on October 18, 2021.

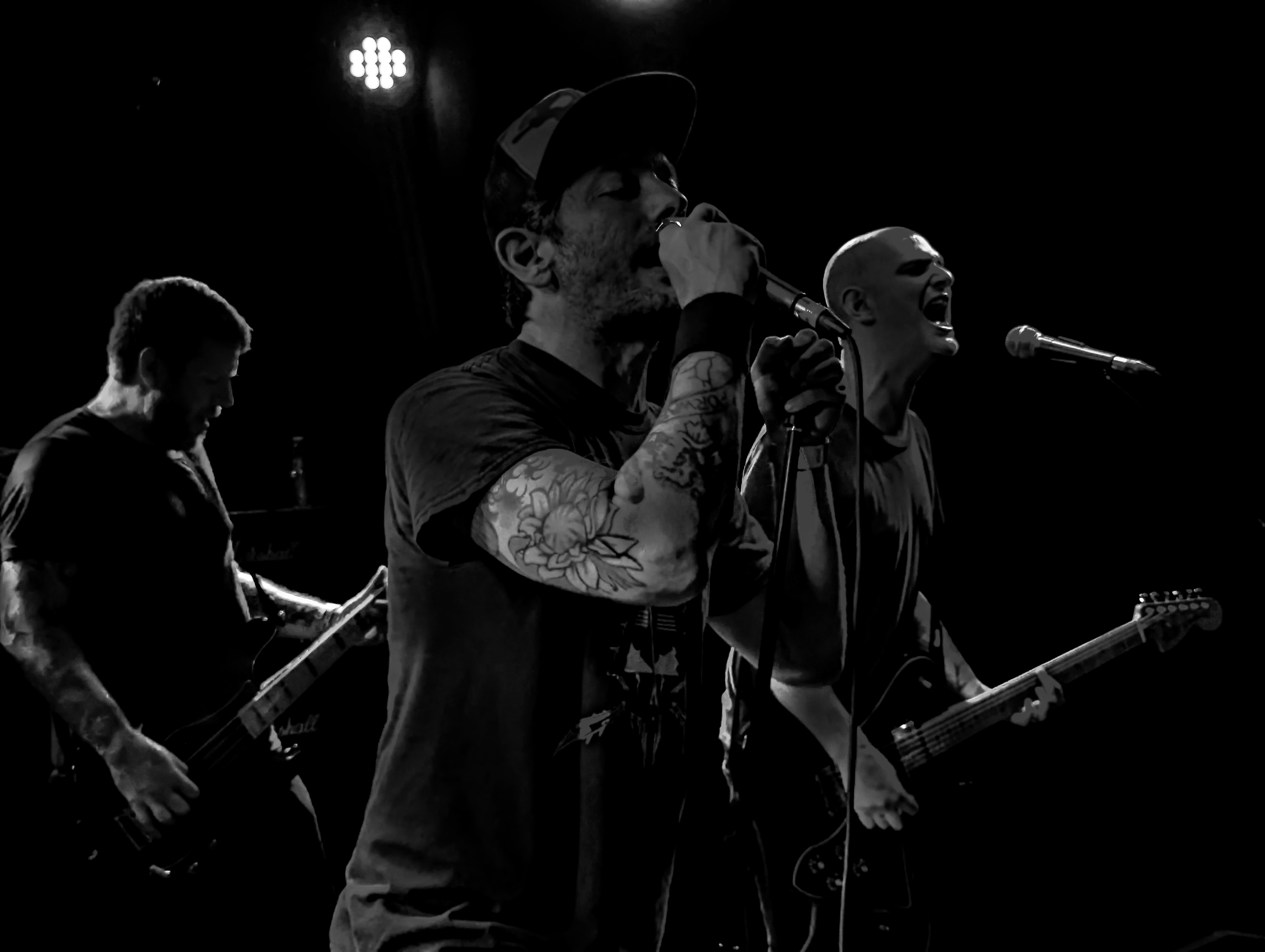
As Friends Rust performing at Boston Music Room in London, England on October 3, 2023. From left to right: Andrew Seward, Damien Moyal, and Ryan Mahon.

On September 25, 2022, As Friends Rust performed at the sixth edition of Furnace Fest. As Darby was on the road touring with Samiam, Michael Lipscomb (who played in the black metal band Rot in Coffins with Simmons) was brought in as bass guitarist. Only a week before the concert, Kirkpatrick injured his shoulder, leading Moyal to recruit ex-Culture and ex-On Bodies bandmate Richard Thurston to fill in on drums.

On June 22, 2023, the band released the single "Positive Mental Platitude," the first song from its second full-length album, Any Joy, which was originally scheduled for release on August 18, 2023, but was delayed to September 8, 2023, via German record label End Hits Records. The band also revealed that Against Me! member, Andrew Seward, had recorded bass guitar on the album and would be touring with the band. The second single from Any Joy, "Final Form," was released on July 20, 2023, followed by "No Gods, Some Masters" on August 17, 2023.

The band embarked on a European and British tour spanning from September 29 to October 7, 2023, accompanied by guitarist and backing vocalist Ryan Mahon filling in for Simmons, who was unable to make the trip due to a business endeavor. The tour was initially booked with American melodic hardcore band Don't Sleep as the supporting act, but Calling Hours (featuring four out of five members of Don't Sleep) came in as a replacement. In promotion of the album, As Friends Rust also performed at The Fest 21 in Gainesville, Florida on October 28, 2023, and at the Saint Vitus in Brooklyn, New York on November 18, 2023.

In March 2024, it was announced that As Friends Rust would be joining Hot Water Music and Quicksand on a two-week European tour scheduled for mid-November 2024. On October 18, 2024, the band released the single "Lost in Space," the first single from their fifth extended play, Lightless, which was released via End Hits Records on November 1, 2024.

== Members ==
=== Current members ===
- Damien Moyal – lead vocals (1996–1997, 1997–2002, 2008–present)
- Timothy Kirkpatrick – drums (1997–2000, 2008–present)
- Joseph Simmons – guitar (1998–2002, 2008–present)
- James Glayat – guitar, backing vocals (1998–2000, 2008–present)
- Andrew Seward – bass guitar (2022–present)

== Discography ==
Studio albums

- Won (2001)
- Any Joy (2023)

EPs

- The Fists of Time (1998)
- As Friends Rust (1999)
- A Young Trophy Band in the Parlance of Our Times (2002)
- Up from the Muck (2020)
- Lightless (2024)
