= Song in the Air =

Studio album by Elliott
- Released: April 23, 2003
- Genre: Emo, Indie rock
- Length: 49:07
- Label: Revelation Records
- Producer: Elliott

Elliott chronology
False Cathedrals (2000)	Song in the Air (2003)	Photorecording (2005)

Professional ratings
Review scores
Source	Rating
AllMusic	4/5 stars
Drowned in Sound	8/10
Pitchfork Media	6.9/10
Punknews.org	4/5 stars

Song in the Air is an album by American emo band Elliott, released in 2003.

== Critical reception ==
Drowned in Sound wrote that "this is Elliott finally realising the ideas exposed on previous recordings, taking the time to focus and fully indulge in glorious sound-scapes and soothing arrangements, and resulting in an album that is pure golden beauty throughout." CMJ New Music Report called the album a "collection of unshakably gratifying songs."

== Track listing ==
No.	Title	Length
1.	"Land and Water"	5:37
2.	"Carry On"	3:53
3.	"Believe"	3:41
4.	"Beijing (Too Many People)"	7:24
5.	"Drag Like Pull"	6:00
6.	"Bleed In Breathe Out"	4:46
7.	"Song in the Air"	3:05
8.	"Away We Drift"	6:06
9.	"Blue Storm"	5:51
10.	"Genea"	2:52
