= The National Acrobat =

American hardcore punk band

- Origin: Louisville, Kentucky, USA
- Genres: Hardcore punk
- Years active: 1998–2000
- Labels: Initial

The National Acrobat was an American hardcore punk band "whose popularity rose after its brief existence". The band was formed in late 1998 by guitarists Evan Patterson and Robby Scott, bassist Ty Kreft, vocalist Casper Adams, and drummer Phil Stosberg. Influenced by the Washington, D.C. hardcore punk scene and contemporary bands like Deadguy, The National Acrobat "quickly earned a reputation for their engaging, humorous, and often confrontational live performances".

In June 1999, The National Acrobat released its eponymous debut EP through a small record label that Kreft and Scott formed together. The band immediately embarked on an east coast and midwest American tour with Canadian post-hardcore band Dead Season. After playing in support of the record, dissent in the band's ranks resulted with the departure of the aforementioned members. Scott was replaced by Evan Patterson's elder brother Ryan (who had up until this point acted as their manager), and Kreft was replaced by Tod Depp. This new lineup recorded material for a planned split EP with Dead Season; but which was eventually released as The National Acrobat, for All Practical Purposes, Is Dead EP in May 2000. This last release featured the Patterson brothers handling bass duties, following Depp's departure, and crediting them to the common punk pseudonym Dale Nixon.

For the subsequent live performances, Stephen George filled on bass, as The National Acrobat played the Midwest and Northeast with groups like Isis and Burn It Down. The band's next release was the It's Nothing Personal EP in October 2000, recorded with the assistance of members of Elliott. In December, the band released the Can't Stop Casper Adams EP. According to Allmusic, "it was the band's defining work and sadly, their last, as internal tensions caused them to split up around the time of the EP's release".

== Discography ==
- The National Acrobat (1999)
- The National Acrobat, for All Practical Purposes, Is Dead (2000)
- It's Nothing Personal (2000)
- Can't Stop Casper Adams (2000)
- TNA: The Complete Recordings (comp., 2004)
