= Initial Records =

American record label

- Founded: 1992
- Founder: Andy Rich
- Defunct: 2004
- Distributor: Mordam
- Genre: Hardcore punk, metalcore, pop punk, post-hardcore, indie rock, emo
- Country of origin: United States
- Location: Louisville, Kentucky

Initial Records was an independent record label in Louisville, Kentucky, that was founded in 1992. The label released music by Falling Forward, Boysetsfire and Ink & Dagger, and created the annual weekend long music festival, Krazy Fest.

== History ==
Initial was founded in 1992 in a Dunkin' Donuts in suburban Detroit by three high school friends, Dennis Hepinstall, Carolyn Smith and Andy Rich. Their first issue was a re-release of the 7" single from local Detroit based hardcore band Pittbull.

Carolyn's interest waned early in the project after her long standing relationship with Dennis ended and she bowed out. Dennis would stick around for another few years while Andy attended the Haworth College of Business at Western Michigan University. By 1995 Dennis had enough and ended his tenure with the label as well. After graduating college with a bachelor of business administration in 1996 Andy relocated to Louisville, KY and took the label with him.

Over the next few years Initial would blossom into one of independent music's most well known labels. The April 1998 issue of Playboy magazine declared Initial one of the country's ten hottest record labels. The May 1998 issue of Alternative Press magazine named Initial as one of "Ten independent labels that have helped to change not only the way hardcore sounds, but the way it does business."

== Krazy Fest ==
Krazy Fest was founded by several Initial Records employees. It was a weekend long music and lifestyle festival that ran annually for six years from 1998 through 2003, with a reprisal in 2011.

== Final release ==
Initial's last release to date was a posthumous CD from Louisville hardcore band By The Grace Of God in 2004. It was a benefit to help pay medical bills for local Louisville scenester Adele Collins. The band also played a reunion show in conjunction with the release.

== Epilogue ==
Longtime Initial Records label chief Andy Rich now resides in Las Vegas where he is the Director of Poker Operations at Golden Nugget Hotel & Casino.

The label's impact was described by Alternative Press in 2013: "While largely associated with Louisville, Kentucky, hardcore, Initial did more than just (exhaustively) cover that scene—it focused on the Midwest, covering bands from Detroit, Chicago, Omaha and more."

== Bands ==
- Black Cross
- Black Widows
- Blood Red
- Boysetsfire
- Blue Sky Mile
- Criteria
- Despair
- Elliott
- The Enkindels
- Falling Forward
- Guilt
- Harkonen
- Helicopter Helicopter
- Ink & Dagger
- The Jazz June
- Lords
- Blue Sky Mile
- The Movielife
- The National Acrobat
- Paulson
- Pittbull
- Planes Mistaken for Stars
- The Reputation
- Ricochet
- Roy
- Peter Searcy
- Shipping News
- Silent Majority
- Slugfest
- Ultimate Fakebook
- The White Octave

== See also ==
- List of record labels
