= Hot Rod Circuit =

American emo band

- Origin: Auburn, Alabama
- Genres: Emo, indie rock
- Years active: 1997–2007, 2011, 2014-present
- Labels: New World, Montalban Hotel, Triple Crown, Vagrant, Immortal
- Members: Andy Jackson; Jay Russell; Casey Prestwood; Mike Poorman
- Past members: Dan Duggins; Jeff Turner; Brian Kiss; Wes Cross; Joe Ballaro; Dustin Hudson

Hot Rod Circuit (HRC) is an American emo band from Auburn, Alabama, established in 1997.

== History ==
=== Early years ===
The band released their first album, Mr. Glenboski, under the name Antidote, winning an award for "Best Unsigned Band of 1998" from Musician Magazine. The band subsequently moved to Connecticut and released If I Knew Now What I Knew Then under the name Hot Rod Circuit (HRC), on September 21, 1999. The band's line-up was Andy Jackson on vocals and rhythm guitar, Casey Prestwood on lead guitar, Jason Russell on bass and vocals, and Wes Cross on drums, who left before their next release. The band performed several shows that year in the New England area, also touring with The Get Up Kids, At the Drive-In and the Jazz June.

The next album was released in September 2000, entitled If It's Cool With You, It's Cool With Me, with new drummer Michael Poorman. The single "Radio Song" received the band's first radio airplay, reaching #2 on the college radio charts. In support of the release, HRC went on national tours with Jimmy Eat World and Reggie and the Full Effect, and an acoustic tour with The New Amsterdams.

=== Sorry About Tomorrow ===
By the fall of 2001, HRC had signed with Vagrant Records. Their third record, Sorry About Tomorrow was recorded at Salad Days Studio in Maryland, and released on March 12, 2002. During 2002, HRC played over 250 shows supporting various artists, as well as the first Vagrant America Tour. The music video for the single "The Pharmacist" aired on MTV and MTV2 nationwide. In 2003, the band toured England, where they played the Reading and Leeds festival. Sorry About Tomorrow was Hot Rod Circuit's highest-selling record. During 2002, Triple Crown Records released a B-Sides collection, Been There, Smoked That, composed of songs from HRC's original out-of-print EP. It also featured live songs and commentaries from tour with the New Amsterdams in 2001 and some covers. In late 2003, shortly after their tour in England, drummer Mike Poorman left the band.

=== Reality's Coming Through ===
In August 2004, Hot Rod released Reality's Coming Through, their second album for Vagrant Records, with new drummer Dan Duggins, and Brian Kiss on backing guitar and vocals. The music video for their single "Save You" appeared on MTV, FUSE, and MTV2. During 2004 and 2005, the band toured with Say Anything, Brand New, and Eisley.

In spring of 2005, bass player Jason Russell left the band to pursue other musical projects, meaning that Hot Rod Circuit had to drop out of The Get Up Kids farewell tour. They joined the 2005 Warped Tour with a substitute bassist, and saw multiple further guest musicians at live shows through the year.

After the Hit The Lights tour of 2005, Hot Rod Circuit began a break of over a year, except a few college shows in early 2006. Around Thanksgiving of 2006, HRC announced their departure from Vagrant Records, and signed with independent music label, Immortal Records. Joe Ballaro became the permanent bass player.

=== The Underground is a Dying Breed ===
In spring of 2007, after signing with Immortal Records, Hot Rod Circuit released The Underground is a Dying Breed. The record was recorded and produced by Andy Jackson at his studio in Montgomery, Alabama. With the release came a US/Canada tour with The Forecast & Limbeck.

HRC shot a video for the single, "Stateside", starring actress Eva Hamilton. The video was the winner of FUSE's "Oven Fresh".

=== Breakup ===
On October 8, 2007, Hot Rod Circuit announced on MySpace that they would be splitting after ten years together. They played an eight-date East Coast farewell tour, with the last show at Toad's Place in New Haven, Connecticut.

=== Reunion ===
On February 10, 2011, Hot Rod Circuit announced they would reunite for a one-off performance at Krazy Fest 2011 in Louisville, Kentucky. Jackson left his other band Terrible Things on April 20, 2011, and on September 1, 2011, it was announced that Hot Rod Circuit would embark on an eight-date tour of the US in November, and release a new three-track 7" vinyl EP.

In 2019, Hot Rod Circuit announced they would join Saves The Day on their "Through Being Cool" tour and would play Sorry About Tomorrow in its entirety.

== Band members ==
Current line-up

- Andy Jackson (vocals, rhythm guitar)
- Casey Prestwood (guitar, pedal steel)
- Jason Russell (bass, vocals)
- Mike Poorman(drums)

Former members

- Wes Cross (1996-1999)
- Dustin Hudson (1997-1999)
- Dan Duggins (2002-2007)
- Brian Kiss (2004–2005)
- Jake Turner (Fill In - 2005)
- Jeff Turner (Fill In - 2005)
- Jerry Morrison (Fill In - 2005)
- Rob Fitzgerald (Fill In - 2005)
- Matt Wilson (Fill In - 2024)

== Discography ==
=== Albums ===
- Mr. Glenboski - (1998 - New World Records)
- If I Knew Now What I Knew Then (1999 - Triple Crown Records)
- If It's Cool With You, It's Cool With Me (2000 - Triple Crown Records)
- Sorry About Tomorrow (2002 - Vagrant Records)
- Reality's Coming Through (2004 - Vagrant Records)
- The Underground Is A Dying Breed (2007 - Immortal Records)

=== EPs & Singles ===
- Hot Rod Circuit - 1999
- Split w/ The Anniversary - 2000
- Split w/ thisyearsmodel - 2001
- Pharmacist - 2003
- The Underground Is A Dying Breed (iTunes Acoustic EP) - 2007
- Hot Rod Circuit - 2011
- Default Setting - 2017

=== Compilations & Soundtracks ===
- Revelation-A-Pop-A-Lypse - 1999
- I ♥ Metal - 1999
- Y2K Proof - 2000
- Welcome To Triple Crown - 2000
- The Best Comp In The World - 2000
- Another Year On The Streets Volume 2 - 2001
- Been There, Smoked That - 2003
- Atticus ...Dragging The Lake II - 2003
- Beer: The Movie - 2003
- Last Nights Escape - 2003
- Outlaw Volleyball: Music From The Game - 2003
- Another Year On The Streets Vol. 3 - 2004
- A Santa Cause 2: Its A Punk Rock Christmas - 2006
- Yo! Indie Rock Raps (Warped Tour Edition) - 2007
- Punk Goes Crunk - 2008
- Friends - 2014
