= False Cathedrals =

Studio album by Elliott
- Released: August 22, 2000
- Genres: Emo, indie rock, alternative rock
- Length: 51:04
- Label: Revelation Records
- Producer: Tobias Miller

Elliott chronology
If They Do (2000)	False Cathedrals (2000)	Song in the Air (2003)

Professional ratings
Review scores
Source	Rating
AllMusic	4/5 stars
Ox-Fanzine	Favorable

False Cathedrals is the second studio album by American emo band Elliott. It was released in August of 2000.

== Background and recording ==
Elliott recorded demos for False Cathedrals at InTransit Studios, a recording studio co-owned by drummer Kevin Ratterman, which was based out of the same renovated warehouse in downtown Louisville where Ratterman and singer-guitarist Chris Higdon lived.

Higdon has cited Radiohead, PJ Harvey, and My Bloody Valentine as influences on the album. During the recording, Higdon also listened to Foo Fighters, Peter Gabriel, Phil Collins, Jawbreaker, Jawbox, Seaweed, and Sugar.

== Track listing ==
No.	Title	Length
1.	"Voices"	1:07
2.	"Calm Americans"	4:25
3.	"Blessed by Your Own Ghost"	5:01
4.	"Drive on to Me"	3:27
5.	"Calvary Song"	5:14
6.	"Lipstick Stigmata"	4:50
7.	"Dying Midwestern"	5:28
8.	"Shallow like Your Breath"	4:30
9.	"Superstitions in Travel"	4:12
10.	"Carving Oswego"	4:30
11.	"Lie Close"	3:51
12.	"Speed of Film"	4:35
