= The Jazz June =

American emo band

- Origin: Kutztown, Pennsylvania, United States
- Genres: Emo, indie rock, alternative rock
- Years active: 1996–2003; 2006; 2014–present
- Labels: Topshelf; Workshop; Initial
- Members: Andrew Low; Bryan Gassler; Daniel O'Neill; Justin Max
- Past members: Adam Gerhart; Nathaniel Duncan; Tim Holland

The Jazz June is an American emo band from Kutztown, Pennsylvania. During their initial run during the 1990s and 2000s, Jazz June played shows with such underground bands as Built to Spill, Hot Rod Circuit, and Mineral. In 2016, Rolling Stone placed the band's album The Medicine at number 33 on its list of the 40 Greatest Emo Albums of All Time.

== History ==
The Jazz June was formed in 1996 by students attending Kutztown University, with the intent of making "music with the same aggression as hardcore but with a more experimental spin on it."The band's name is derived from a passage in the Gwendolyn Brooks poem "We Real Cool."

The group recorded its first full-length album They Love Those Who Make the Music in 1997. The album, as well as The Boom, the Motion, and the Music EP were recorded through Canadian record label Workshop Records. In 1998, the band signed with Initial Records.

Following a tour with Hot Rod Circuit, Jazz June spent four days recording their following full-length, 2000's The Medicine, at Inner Ear Studios with producer J. Robbins. In 2002, Jazz June released their fourth studio album Better Off Without Air. The album saw the band break with their previous sound and incorporate more influences from bands on independent labels Dischord Records and Thrill Jockey.

Jazz June disbanded in 2003. However, the band reunited for benefit shows in 2006 to raise money for their former roadie, who had brain cancer. The band released an outtakes-and-rarities compilation the following year.

In 2014, the Jazz June reformed and recorded their fifth studio album After the Earthquake with producer Evan Weiss of Into It. Over It.. The same year, the band worked with their label Topshelf Records to release The Medicine for the first time on vinyl.

== Members ==
- Andrew Low – vocals, guitar
- Bryan Gassler – guitar
- Daniel O'Neill – bass
- Justin Max – drums
- Adam Gerhart
- Nathaniel Duncan
- Tim Holland – guitar, trumpet, keyboards

== Discography ==
- They Love Those Who Make The Music (Workshop Records, 1997)
- The Boom, the Motion, and the Music EP (Workshop Records, 1998)
- Breakdance Suburbia (Initial Records, 1998)
- The Medicine (Initial Records, 2000)
- Better Off Without Air (Initial Records, 2002)
- The Scars to Prove It compilation (Universal Warning, 2007)
- After the Earthquake (Topshelf Records, 2014)
