= Ultimate Fakebook =

American power pop band

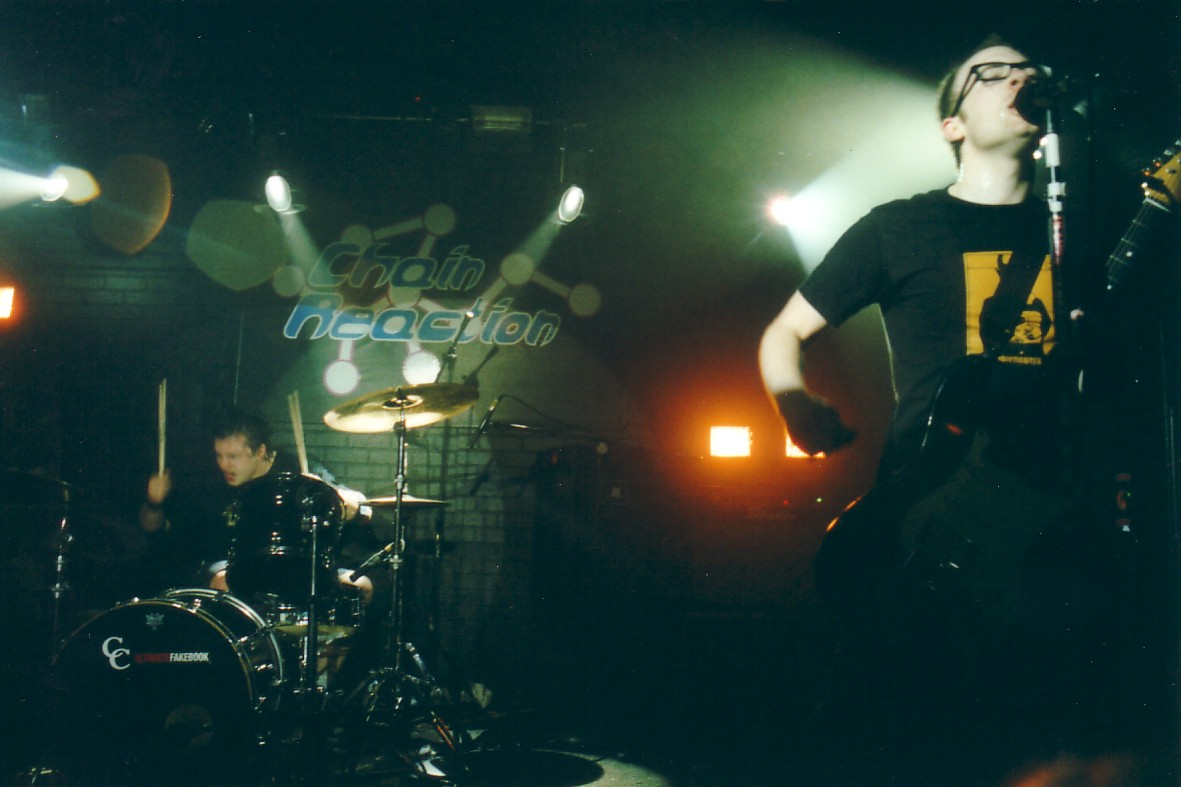
- Ultimate Fakebook performing at Chain Reaction in 2003

Background information
- Origin: Manhattan, Kansas, U.S.
- Genres: Indie rock power pop Alternative rock Emo
- Years active: 1994–2003; 2007; 2009; 2010–present
- Labels: Noisome Records; 550 Music/Epic Records; Initial Records; Rocket Heart Records; Sonic Ritual Recordings
- Members: Bill McShane; Nick Colby; Eric Melin
- Past members: J.D. Warnock; Jason "Mot" Waldmann

Ultimate Fakebook is an American three-piece power pop band from Manhattan, Kansas, United States.

== Albums and EPs ==
Ultimate Fakebook has released five albums and an EP: Electric Kissing Parties (1997, Noisome Records), This Will Be Laughing Week (1999, Noisome Records & 2000, 550 Music/Epic Records), Open up and Say Awesome (2002, Initial Records), Before We Spark (EP, 2003, Initial Records), Daydream Radio Is Smiling Static (2010, Self-Released) and The Preserving Machine (2020, Sonic Ritual Records).

== First break-up and post break-up activities ==
Shortly after releasing their 2003 EP Before We Spark they broke up to "branch off in search of new adventures". Later Melin stated that the break up was due to label pressure and opined "we signed to a major label (Epic Records) too early."

In 2007, Melin and Warnock both appeared on VH1's World Series of Pop Culture on the team "Westerberg High". They advanced to the quarterfinals before being eliminated by "Three Men & A Little Lazy". Together, they now run a movie review and film pop culture website, scene-stealers.com.

On December 30, 2008, Ultimate Fakebook played a small reunion show for a friend's birthday at the recordBar in Kansas City, Missouri.

On Thursday, February 5, 2009, Ultimate Fakebook reunited again, this time for a much larger "official" reunion show at the Uptown Theater in Kansas City. This was also a benefit for the JayDoc free clinic, where licensed volunteer physicians supervise University of Kansas School of Medicine students who provide care to the area's under-served populations. The clinic operates on a volunteer basis, with supplies and medicines purchased through grants and donations.

On December 18, 19, and 20, 2009, the band opened for former touring mates and friends Motion City Soundtrack at Lincoln Hall in Chicago, Illinois.

The band played a concert in Kansas City at Record Bar on December 28, 2013, performing material from Daydream Radio is Smiling Static.

In 2024 and 2025 the band played several shows across the United States in support of the 25th anniversary of the original indie release of This Will Be Laughing Week in which they played the album in its entirety.

== Newer releases ==
On July 27, 2010, the band self-released their first album since 2003. A digital download comprising 16 original songs and one cover, the album is entitled Daydream Radio Is Smiling Static and is available exclusively on the band's website.

In April 2020, they released The Preserving Machine on Sonic Ritual Records, which features the first new material in 16 years and singles After Hours at Melin's and Manhattan, KS.

== Members ==
Current Members

- Bill McShane - (vocals, lead guitar)
- Nick Colby - (bass guitar)
- Eric Melin - (drums)

Former Members

- Jason "Mot" Waldmann - (drums)
- J.D. Warnock - (rhythm guitar)

== Discography ==
Year	Title	Record label	Type
1997	Electric Kissing Parties	Noisome Records	album
1999	This Will Be Laughing Week	Noisome Records	album
2002	Open Up and Say "Awesome"	Initial Records	album
2003	Before We Spark	Initial Records	EP
2010	Daydream Radio Is Smiling Static	Self released	album
2020	The Preserving Machine	Sonic Ritual Recordings	album
