= Elliott (band) =

American emo band

- Origin: Louisville, Kentucky, U.S.
- Genres: Emo; indie rock
- Years active: 1995–2003; 2022–present
- Labels: Revelation, Initial
- Spinoff of: Falling Forward
- Members: Chris Higdon; Benny Clark; Jay Palumbo; Jason Skaggs; Jonathan Mobley; Billy Bisig; Kevin Ratterman; Ben Lord
- Website: Revelation Records Profile

Elliott is an American emo band from Louisville, Kentucky. They released three albums and several 7"s in their eight-year career, and were signed to Revelation Records.

== History ==
=== Formation and early releases (1995–1998) ===
After the dissolution of Louisville band Falling Forward, vocalist Chris Higdon, bassist Jonathan Mobley, and drummer Ben Lord would form Elliott in 1995. Higdon would take up guitar, and the band would recruit second guitarist Jay Palumbo. After a year with the band, Lord would quit, being replaced by Kevin Ratterman. The band's early influences included Quicksand, Jawbox, and Sunny Day Real Estate.

2000's False Cathedrals, their follow-up to U.S. Songs, a more polished affair than its predecessor, with Ratterman utilizing samplers and drum machines to fill out the band's sound. False Cathedrals was met with critical acclaim by a broad cross-section of the underground rock community.

Shortly after the completion of False Cathedrals, Mobley opted to reduce his involvement with Elliott, becoming an "honorary member" of the band, in order to spend more time with his growing family. After a tour with Hot Water Music, Palumbo decided to leave the band due to personal reasons and creative differences with the rest of the band. Jason Skaggs took over on bass, and Falling Forward's Benny Clark was enlisted to play guitar. Clark's ethereal, effects-heavy sound would go on to have a significant impact on Elliott's music. In May 2001, the band dropped off a tour with the Toadies amid a "disagreement with management decisions".

=== Song in the Air, departure of Skaggs, and break up (2003) ===
Between March and May 2002, the band was recording an EP, which eventually turned into an album's worth of material. Following this, they toured across the US in May and June with Christiansen and Liars Academy. In August 2002, the band performed at Furnace Fest. In February and March, Elliott supported Further Seems Forever on their headlining US tour. Song in the Air was announced in December 2002, and released in April 2003, through Revelation Records. It marked another stylistic shift for the group, incorporating more post-rock influences, as well as live string arrangements by the Louisville group Rachel's. Pitchfork Media called Song in the Air "a far more dynamic and internally cohesive record than any of the group's previous efforts.".

Skaggs left the group shortly after the completion of Song in the Air. He was replaced by Billy Bisig. Shortly after Song in the Air's release, Elliott announced their intention to break up. They completed final tours of Europe and the US, before disbanding in November 2003.

=== Posthumous ===
Members of Elliott have been busy since the group's demise. Singer/Guitarist Chris Higdon is now fronting the group Frontier(s) alongside members of Automatic, Mouthpiece, Enkindels, Stay Gold and others. They signed to No Sleep Records in March 2009; they later released their debut album There Will Be No Miracles through Arena Rock Recording Company in August 2010. Benny Clark is playing bass in a group named Parlour. Kevin Ratterman operates a recording studio called The Funeral Home. In 2025, Chris Higdon formed post-hardcore supergroup Mirrorless with Ryan Patterson (Fotocrime, Coliseum), Brian Roundtree (By The Grace Of The God), and Ben Sears (Xerxes, Black God).

=== Reformation ===
The band reunited in 2022.

== Discography ==
Date of Release	Title	Label	Format
1997	In Transit	Initial Records	7"
1998	Elliott / Sunday Evening Dinner Club / Kid Dynamite (Split EP)	I Stand Alone	7"
August 4, 1998	U.S. Songs	Revelation Records	CD, LP
January 11, 2000	If They Do (EP)	Initial Records	CD, 7"
January 11, 2000	Will You	Revelation Records	7"
August 22, 2000	False Cathedrals	Revelation Records	CD, LP
April 23, 2003	Song in the Air	Revelation Records	CD, LP
October 4, 2005	Photorecording	Revelation Records	CD/DVD Box Set
April 20, 2013	Songs in a Transit Wind	Simba Recordings	LP
