= Everynight Fire Works =

Studio album by Hey Mercedes
- Released: October 23, 2001
- Recorded: April 14–28, 2001
- Studios: Pachyderm, Cannon Falls, Minnesota
- Genres: Alternative rock; emo; indie rock; pop-punk
- Length: 43:02
- Label: Vagrant
- Producers: J. Robbins, Hey Mercedes

Hey Mercedes chronology
Everynight Fire Works (2001)	Loses Control (2003)

Everynight Fire Works is the debut studio album by American rock band Hey Mercedes. Following the demise of Braid, most of the members formed Hey Mercedes, with guitarist Mark Dawursk joining in early 2000. The band released a self-titled EP through Polyvinyl Record Co., before signing to Vagrant Records at the end of the year. They recorded their debut with Burning Airlines member J. Robbins at Pachyderm Studios in Cannon Falls, Minnesota in April 2001. Everynight Fire Works is an alternative rock, emo, indie rock and pop punk record that drew comparisons to Burning Airlines, Jets to Brazil, and Shudder to Think.

Everynight Fire Works was announced for release shortly after recording, but was delayed a few times because of distribution troubles or legal issues that Vagrant was having. It was eventually released on October 23, where it was met with a mixed-to-positive reaction from music critics, with some commenting on the group's maturity and guitar work, as well as Nanna's vocals. Sometime after release, Dawursk left the band and was replaced with Michael Shumaker, and drummer Damon Atkinson spent some time touring with Saves the Day. The band went on two stints of the US, one as part of the Vagrant America arena tour, with other acts on the label. In all, Everynight Fire Works was promoted with over 200 shows.

== Background ==
In June 1999, Braid announced they would be breaking up, and played their final shows in August. Guitarist Chris Broach focused his efforts on the Firebird Band, while the other members of Braid spent time at home. Vocalist/guitarist Bob Nanna, bassist Todd Bell and drummer Damon Atkinson began playing together in October 1999; the first Hey Mercedes practice was held in April 2000. After auditioning two people, former Alligator Gun guitarist Mark Dawursk joined that same month. The members lived in separate cities between Chicago, Illinois and Milwaukee, Wisconsin; Nanna had to travel from Chicago to Milwaukee to practice during weekdays, only to return home the following morning for work. In spite of this, the band worked on material. They recorded a four-track EP not long after Dawursk joined, and had planned to self-release it, despite them having no money. Nanna worked at a brokerage firm, Bell and Atkinson spent time at a bakery, and Dawursk served at a coffee shop. They eventually shopped it to different labels, before Polyvinyl Record Co. founder Matt Lunsford offered to release it.

Prior to its release, Atkinson was contacted by independent label Vagrant Records, who congratulated the band on the EP. In August, the group played their first show, which was followed by the release of the self-titled EP the following month through Polyvinyl. It showcased a mix of the syncopated drum parts of Braid with a more melodic structure, spotlight by Nanna's vocals. Long-time connections enabled to band to tour with the likes of Alkaline Trio, Saves the Day and Jets to Brazil. They flew out to California to play some gigs in December 2000. While there, they had a meeting with Vagrant founder Rich Egan. Hey Mercedes announced their signing to the label at the end of the month. Nanna told the label that "if there was an excellent sounding album to be made," they only required two weeks to record it and two weeks to mix it, which they subsequently greenlit. On March 2, 2001, the band demoed 15 tracks for potential inclusion on their debut album. In March and April, the group went on a short US tour, with Dashboard Confessional appearing on all dates. The Anniversary supported the first half, and Hot Rod Circuit covered the second half.

== Production ==
Hey Mercedes recorded their debut album with Burning Airlines member J. Robbins as the producer. He handled the recording with assistance from Neil Weir and Bruce Templeton. They picked Robbins as they worked well with him previously on Braid's last album Frame & Canvas (1998). Hey Mercedes tried to get Robbins to producer their EP, which was produced by Mark Haines, but was unable due to timing problems. They initially wanted both Haines and Robbins to produce the album, but settled on Robbins. Unlike that release, which was only recorded and mixed in five days, the band had more time and a bigger budget to work on Everynight Fire Works. The band travelled from Minneapolis, Minnesota to Pachyderm Studios in Cannon Falls, Minnesota. The group resided in a building next to the studio, which had multiple rooms and recreation areas. Robbins and Atkinson spent the first day of recording, April 14, working on drums and attempting to the get the best sound of them in room. By the end of the day, Atkinson and Bell had returned to Minneapolis to gather some supplies. A chart was drafted up and the band had a production meeting regarding some of the song details.

They did rough versions of "Haven't Been This Happy" and "Every Turn". The second day saw the basic outlines of "Every Turn", "A-List Actress", "Our Weekend Starts on Wednesday", "The Frowning of a Lifetime" and "Haven't Been This Happy" being recorded. Robbins, Atkinson and Dawursk laid down rhythm parts for the aforementioned tracks; Bell recorded his parts for these tracks the following day. Drums and bass were then recorded for "Quit", "Que Shiraz" and "Everybody's Working for the Weak", "Eleven to Your Seven" and "The Slightest Idea". Nanna and Dawursk spent time with Robbins on April 17 laying basic guitar parts for those tracks; Dawursk finished all of his parts, while Nanna only managed three. The next day, Nanna re-recorded his previous guitar tracks as the "head / speaker combo made them sound a little too 'oogey'... Meaning a tad muddy in the low end."

Drums were then recorded for "Let's Go Blue", "Save a Life", "That's Right I Said It" and "What You Are Up Against". The band spent April 19 re-listening to all of the drum tracks recorded up to that point, before Bell recorded bass on "Save a Life" and Nanna did guitar for "The Frowning of a Lifetime". The following day, Nanna then re-worked his guitar parts for 11 of the tracks, and added guitar to "What You're Up Against" and "The Promise". On April 21, Dawursk tracked guitars for "The Slightest Idea" and "Let's Go Blue", and finished all of his remaining parts the next day. Nanna recorded vocals from April 23, with Robbins making rough mixes as they went along. By April 27, Nanna's voice gave out, resulting in him tracking some guitar overdubs, including an intro to "The Frowning of a Lifetime". Haines mixed the recordings between May 1 and 15 at Smart Studios in Madison, Wisconsin, with supervision by Nanna and Bell. The recordings were then mastered by Scott Hull at Classic Sounds, Inc.

== Composition ==
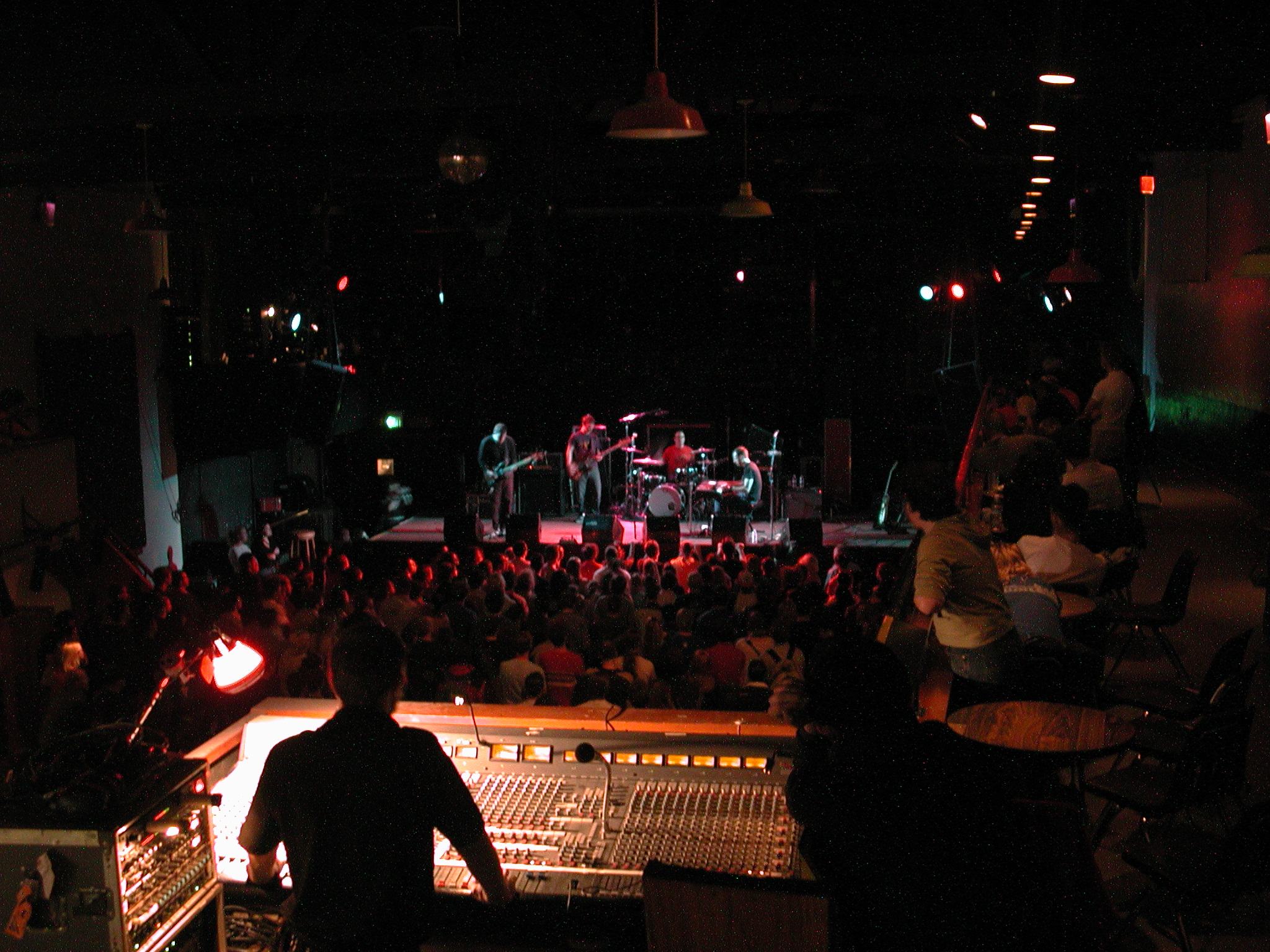
The music and lyrics of Everynight Fire Works earned the band a comparison to Jets to Brazil.

Musically, the sound of Everynight Fire Works has been described as alternative rock, emo, indie rock and pop-punk, with elements of 1980s pop, drawing comparisons to Burning Airlines, Jets to Brazil, and Shudder to Think. Nanna explained that the title referred to "'working' every night. ... It's about every night, non-stop, work work work." Atkinson theorised they had spent around a year writing for the record, breaking occasionally to perform shows. The main reason for the length of time was the band wishing to move away from the angular guitar work of Braid and into a sound of their own. Robbins and Christine Lubarsky contributed extra vocals and percussion to the recordings. The opening track "The Frowning of a Lifetime" displays the guitar interplay between Nanna and Dawursk. "Every Turn" sees Nanna use his vocals in a way that recalled Braid. "A-List Actress" is about turning one's life into a movie, including drama and romance. "The Slightest Idea" showcases Nanna's vocal ability, opening with a single-note guitar part. The pop track "Eleven to Your Seven" is done in the vein of Cheap Trick. It was written during a period of frustration for Nanna between the break up of Braid and the formation of Hey Mercedes. It talks about dealing with being unlucky; the numbers refer to a competitive score.

"Que Shiraz" is a power ballad; its name being a play on the phrase "que sera", with the latter word being swapped for the Australian wine name Shiraz. The breakdown during the song features Bell and Atkinson's instruments synching up, with the latter playing 16th notes on his hi-hat and the former playing sparse bass notes that synch with the kick drum. Nanna said this part was influenced by Jimmy Eat World. During the mixing stage, they found one note Nanna sung was out of key, and fixed it with Auto-Tune. The intro to "Our Weekend Starts on Wednesday" starts in the 6/4 time signature; the song incorporates punk rock and thrash metal influences. "What You're Up Against" talks about frustration and working. The closing track "Let's Go Blue" was reminiscent of "Never Surrender" by Corey Hart. It sees a guitar riff being played over a larger chord progression with bass and drum breakdowns, which Nanna said Dawursk or Bell came up with.

== Release ==
On May 16, 2001, Everynight Fire Works was announced for release two months' time. To promote an upcoming tour, the label asked the band if they would forego the release of a single, in return for their debut being released soon, which they agreed to. In late July, the band appeared at Krazy Fest 4 in Louisville, Kentucky. Around this time, the members quit their day jobs to focus entirely on the band. On August 8, 2001, the band announced that the album would be delayed "due to production issues and legal issues" on the label's side. Vagrant were in legal trouble with another label of the same name who attempted to trademark "Vagrant", resulting in their website being taken down. On September 16, 2001, the band said the album was delayed to late October 2001, citing distribution problems; Universal stopped distributing the label's releases, which were now being handled by TVT Records.

Everynight Fire Works was eventually released on October 23, 2001, through Vagrant Records. Designer Gregg Bernstein and photographer Christopher Strong worked together to come up with the artwork concept after discussing with the rest of the band. Nanna said he gave them the songs and the album's title and left them to work on it. Bernstein brought several ideas to show the band while they were in the mixing process. The first one they saw was the final artwork, which they were "speechless" upon viewing it. In November and December 2001, the group went on tour with Saves the Day and Thursday. Nanna, Atkinson and Bell felt that having Dawursk in the group "wasn't the best thing", and subsequently let him go. Nanna said Dawursk and the rest of the band seemed to be on "different pages – not really even musically, but just kind of everything else". They announced his departure on February 2, 2002; he was temporarily replaced by Sean O'Brien, who previously played with Nanna in Orwell. Atkinson spent some time touring with Saves the Day as their temporary drummer, before returning to Hey Mercedes in early March 2002. They played the occasional US show throughout the month, with one date in Japan in the middle. They held auditions for a new guitarist, selecting Michael Shumaker of Sheilbound after he learned all of the tracks within a week. On May 6, 2002, Shumaker was officially announced as their newest member.

The companion EP The Weekend was released in July 2002. The band were due to film a music video for "Our Weekend Starts on Wednesday" during the same month, however, the shoot was cancelled three days prior to filming. The band recorded an alternative version of the song that was meant to appear in the video; it was later posted on their website. In July and August 2002, the group went on a US tour with Piebald, Audio Learning Center, and Koufax; Piebald had to drop off a few of the shows due to a throat illness, and were replaced by Schatzi. The band had planned to appear on the Vagrant America arena tour, alongside other Vagrant Records bands, until the trek was pushed back to early 2003. In October 2002, the band performed at the Grand Rapids Skate Fest. In November and December 2002, the band toured across the US with Avail and the Curse; Planes Mistaken for Stars and the Reunion Show appeared on select dates. Hey Mercedes embarked on a celebratory tour for the album in July and August 2016. Everynight Fire Works was reissued to coincide with the stint.

== Reception ==
Professional ratings
Review scores
Source	Rating
AllMusic	3/5 stars
CMJ New Music Report	Favorable
LAS Magazine	Favorable
Modern Fix	Favorable
Ox-Fanzine	Favorable
Pitchfork	3/10
Spin	4/10
Tiny Mix Tapes	3.5/5 stars

Everynight Fire Works received mixed-to-positive reviews from music critics. CMJ New Music Report writer Nicole Keiper said fans of Braid would like the release a lot, from Nanna's "pleading yelps and stop-start guitar breaks" to Atkinson's "neck-snapping snare smashes". The album showed "men who are comfortable in their skin, wearing well-crafted vocal melodies and simple, catchy riffs". Ox-Fanzine's Joachim Hiller considered it "mature, elegant indie rock". Modern Fix editor Mike Bushman praised Nanna for having "a good command of his vocal range and fills in the vocal dynamic well". Though he likened the band to a more "direct, melodic" branch away from Braid, he enjoyed the "smoother take on the indie guitar rock that searches for melody and mood within its pumping chord strums."

LAS Magazine founder Eric J. Herboth said that despite him "expecting the worst", he eventually saw it as "the best album that Vagrant has put out", "packed from beginning to end with slickness, [and] a furiously catchy, meaty guitar sandwich". The band had "thoroughly floored" him with the release, applauding the "increasing complexity" of the guitar work, combined with a "more streamlined approach by the rhythm section, that makes this album tick". AllMusic reviewer Tom Semioli said it was an "aggressive collection of guitar driven emo-rock tracks built upon melody and passion." The group's "clever two-guitar arrangements" that fused "basic voicings with linear phrases" were backed by a stable "rhythm section that turns the beat around when you least expect it."

Tiny Mix Tapes wrote that the record encapsulated the group's "live energy and their studio perfectionism", with the band sometimes fitting into the "genre they are clumsily lumped into, but other times, don't; they come across as the big intelligent independent brother" to acts such as Saves the Day. Lollipop Magazine's Tim Den noted Nanna's evolution as a vocalist, writing that his "dipping register, tricky punctuation, and odd-tempo melody breaks (thanks in large part to the entire band’s fondness for math rock time signatures) have leapt beyond indie rock expectations and into the realm of just pure songwriting." Den also praised J. Robbins' production and the band's "angular riffs".

In a review for Spin, author Andy Greenwald said the band were "a competent facsimile of their peers, but too late too late", and said they had the same modus operandi as Braid, complete with "choruses that aim for the bleachers but stop at first base." He expanded further, saying that "everything" on the release was "tentative–from the meandering melodies to the wan, froggy vocals" of Nanna. Pitchfork contributor Rob Mitchum said he couldn't "decide whether I'm disappointed or just plain angry about the vanilla ice-cream blandness of Everynight Fire Works." He said Nanna was "determined to dumb down his songs to reach a wider audience, trading in the polyrhythms and unusual dynamics of old for power chords, power chords, power chords."

Audiogalaxy listed it as their album of the year. Everynight Fire Works has appeared on a best-of emo album list by Drowned in Sound.

== Track listing ==
Track listing per booklet.

No.	Title	Length
1.	"The Frowning of a Lifetime"	4:15
2.	"Every Turn"	4:13
3.	"A-List Actress"	3:29
4.	"The Slightest Idea"	3:17
5.	"Eleven to Your Seven"	3:54
6.	"Que Shiraz"	4:17
7.	"Our Weekend Starts on Wednesday"	2:15
8.	"Haven't Been This Happy"	3:30
9.	"What You're Up Against"	4:19
10.	"Quit"	5:14
11.	"Let's Go Blue"	4:19
Total length:		43:02

== Personnel ==
Personnel per booklet.

Hey Mercedes

- Damon Atkinson – drums
- Todd Bell – vocals, bass
- Mark Dawursk – vocals, guitar
- Bob Nanna – lead vocals, guitar

Additional musicians

- J. Robbins – extra vocals, percussion
- Christine Lubarsky – extra vocals, percussion

Production

- J. Robbins – producer, recording
- Hey Mercedes – producer
- Neil Weir – assistant
- Bruce Templeton – assistant
- Mark Haines – mixing
- Scott Hull – mastering
- Christopher Strong – photography
- Gregg Bernstein – art direction, design
