= Loses Control =

Studio album by Hey Mercedes
- Released: October 7, 2003
- Recorded: April–May 2003
- Studios: Camp Street, Cambridge, Massachusetts
- Genres: Indie rock, pop-punk, power pop
- Length: 42:49
- Label: Vagrant
- Producers: Sean Slade, Paul Q. Kolderie

Hey Mercedes chronology
Everynight Fire Works (2001)	Loses Control (2003)	Unorchestrated (2005)

Loses Control is the second and final studio album by American rock band Hey Mercedes. Following the release of Everynight Fire Works (2001), guitarist Mark Dawursk left the band was replaced by Michael Shumaker in May 2002. Between then and the end of the year, the band spent time writing new material. They recorded Loses Control in April and May at Camp Street Studios in Cambridge, Massachusetts with producers Sean Slade and Paul Q. Kolderie. Loses Control is an indie rock, pop-punk and power pop record that used bigger and thicker guitar sounds, and Nanna double-tracking his voice.

Preceded by a co-headlining national US tour with Sense Field, Loses Control was released on October 7, 2003, through Vagrant Records. It received a generally positive reaction from music critics, with some praising the guitar tones, and finding it a worthy follow-up to Everynight Fire Works. It was promoted with a North American trek and a music video for "Quality Revenge at Last". Subsequent touring consisted of supporting or headlining stints with the likes of Wheat, the Early November and Saves the Day. The members reunited their former band Braid in mid-2004; following a European tour later in the year, Hey Mercedes broke up in early 2005.

== Background and production ==
Hey Mecedes released their debut album Everynight Fire Works in October 2001 through independent label Vagrant Records. It was promoted with over 200 shows, across the label-sponsored Vagrant America tour, and stints with Saves the Day, Jimmy Eat World and New End Original. The band announced the departure of guitarist Mark Dawursk in February 2002; his role was temporarily filled by Sean O'Brien, who played with Nanna previously in Orwell. The band spent April and May writing new material; alongside this, Michael Shumaker of Sheilbound was announced as their new guitarist in May. In October, the band spent two weeks in Spread Eagle, Wisconsin writing new material. In December, the band debuted two new songs live. In February and March 2003, the band embarked on a headlining US tour with support from Armor for Sleep, Breaking Pangaea, Panic in Detroit, and Aloha.

On February 18, the band revamped their website to promote their second album Loses Control, which was due for release towards the end of the year. Pre-production was done at Q Division in Cambridge, Massachusetts. Loses Control was recorded in April and May 2003 at Camp Street Studios, also in Cambridge, Massachusetts, with producers Sean Slade and Paul Q. Kolderie. They strayed from using J. Robbins, as they had done previously, and wanted to see what other people could bring to their sound. The pair acted as engineers with assistance from Adam Taylor, while Matt Beaudoin handled editing. Slade and Kolderie were familiar with the band's work, and were able to tell which of their guitars were needed for a certain part for each song. Nanna said the guitars were "really layered -they just sound big and fat." Slade and Kolderie mixed the recordings at Camp Street, before they were mastered by Emily Lazar at The Lodge in New York City.

== Composition ==
Loses Control has been described as an indie rock, pop-punk and power pop release, which shifted away from the group's earlier emo stylings. It was compared to the likes of Something to Write Home About by the Get Up Kids, Bleed American by Jimmy Eat World, Jawbox, and Guided by Voices. The band utilized bigger and thicker sounding guitars for the record. Nanna's vocals are double-tracked for the majority of the album, drawing a comparison to Alkaline Trio frontman Matt Skiba on that band's Good Mourning (2003) album. Nanna said the lyrics were "pretty bleak and desolate."

The opening track "Quality Revenge at Last" it includes instances of staccato and palm-muted guitar parts. The chorus section discuses late-night car journeys through the suburbs of Illinois. "It's Been a Blast" was the first track written for the album, after the release of Everynight Fire Works. The power pop track "Playing Your Song" was reminiscent of Smile, and is followed by the New Romantic-indebted "Knowing When to Stop" and the post-punk number "The Boy Destroyers". "Oh Penny" recalls the Jawbox song "Tongues". "Lashing Out" talks about the aggression inside everyone, and is followed by the slow-tempo track "Police Police Me". "Absolute Zero Drive" was planned as a B-side until Slade and Kolderie persuaded the group. The closing track "Go on Drone" details an evening spent at a bar between a couple.

== Release ==
On July 23, 2003, an MP3 of "Quality Revenge at Last" was posted online. In August and September, the group embarked on a co-headlining national US tour with Sense Field. They were supported by Damone and Soundtrak. On August 20, "It's Been a Blast" and "Knowing When to Stop" were posted online. Though Loses Control was planned for release on September 2, it was eventually released on October 7 through Vagrant. The band was due to appear on the CMJ tour in November, however, due to complications, the band instead went on a headlining North American trek in November and December, dubbed Hurry Up Offense Tour. The first half of the dates were supported by JamisonParker, Jet by Day, the remainder was supported by Hopesfall, Bear vs. Shark, Haste and Jude the Obscure.

A split single with Favez was released through UK label Sound Fiction on November 19, featuring the Hey Mercedes tracks "Quality Revenge at Last" and "Warm Chords". A music video for "Quality Revenge at Last" was filmed and premiered on MTV.com on November 24, directed by Matt Barry and Maureen Egan. Nanna said they wished to make a "fun, non-dramatic" visual counterpart to the track's upbeat nature. It was filmed in a single day and features the band going through a car wash; the members subsequently contracted pneumonia from this. Nanna said his original concept was for only one person to go through the car wash, but this plan was changed to the band at the insistence of the directors. In February 2004, the group went on tour with Wheat; partway through it their touring van broken down, resulting in them dropping off two shows.

In March, the band toured with the Early November, Spitalfield and Limbeck, leading up to a support slot for Saves the Day and Grandaddy on their co-headlining tour in March and April. When one of the other support acts, the Fire Theft, dropped off the tour, Hey Mercedes were given a longer set time. In May, Nanna went on a solo tour; Nanna, Atkinson and Bell reunited Braid for some shows between May and July. In October, Hey Mercedes went on a tour of Europe, before taking time off. On January 20, 2005, the band announced they would be breaking up; they later played their final show in April. Outtakes and demos from the album's sessions were released on the Unorchestrated EP in May through independent label Grand Theft Autumn.

== Reception ==
Professional ratings
Review scores
Source	Rating
AllMusic	4.5/5 stars
CMJ New Music Monthly	Unfavorable
Exclaim!	Favorable
LAS Magazine	Mixed
Modern Fix	Favorable
The Nerve	Favorable
PopMatters	Favorable
Punknews.org	3.5/5 stars
Spin	C

By July 2004, it had sold around 13,000 copies.

Loses Control received generally positive reviews from music critics. AllMusic reviewer Tim Sendra said the group "cashes in on the promise it exhibited on its previous records" with "12 streamlined, hooky pop songs that just happen to have loud guitars." He complimented Nanna's "sweet and powerful" vocals, adding that he "should be in Fotomaker or Artful Dodger or some other long lost and forgotten power pop band." Exclaim! writer Sam Sutherland said it was a "gorgeous sounding record, the care that has gone into guitar tone alone on this record is outstanding." He wrote that Nanna "retains the distinct delivery" throughout his various guises, with a vocal effect that provides the "melodies [with] a very ethereal quality unique to this release."

Modern Fix said it was a "hook-laced indie rock" record that is "firing on all cylinders. It’s emotional, without whining. It’s smooth without being dull." Christine Klunk of PopMatters said it included "12 tracks of slickly put together rock" with the group having improved since their debut, "both lyrically and instrumentally". The Nerve writer Adam Simpkins said the band grew "in scope and sound", without abandoning their roots. Writing for CMJ New Music Report, Amy Sciarretto stated that the band "wisely strays from the lovelorn 'my grrrl left me' topics, instead centering in a wealth of impressive hooks" and described the album as "a well-thought out, eloquently executed indie rock record."

LAS Magazine reviewer Jake M. Rizy said it was "characterized by very crisp and slick production that makes it come off as planned and restrained", though considered it "a marked improvement" from their debut. The record "showcases some better songwriting ability [over the debut] alongside some skilled pop songs", with the guitars "sound[ing] bigger and thicker, and everything sounds like a clear and calculated effort." Spin's Jon Caramanica said "Loses Control is an optimistic title" as "nearly everything here is competent and methodical".

Punknews.org staff member Scott Heisel said the release "just didn't sit right with me", saying Nanna's vocals came across as "too polished", and questioning the production choices. He expanded on the latter: "[the band has] two guitars that generally play different things, but one of them almost always gets buried in the mix behind mounds of distortion." Andrew Bonazelli of CMJ New Music Monthly said the album was "ironically (given the title), the most measured, incombustible output of Nanna's career." The group seemed "too comfortable in their zone as the 'radio-friendly Braid,' unwilling to take compositional risks" which could remove them from an "increasingly generic pack."

== Track listing ==
Track listing per booklet.

1. "Quality Revenge at Last" – 3:30
2. "It's Been a Blast" – 3:15
3. "Playing Your Song" – 3:24
4. "Knowing When to Stop" – 3:16
5. "The Boy Destroyers" – 3:27
6. "Unorchestrated" – 3:26
7. "Lashing Out" – 3:38
8. "Police Police Me" – 3:53
9. "Oh Penny" – 4:19
10. "The Switch" – 3:02
11. "Absolute Zero Drive" – 3:48
12. "Go on Drone" – 3:51

== Personnel ==
Personnel per booklet.

Hey Mercedes

- Damon Atkinson – drums
- Todd Bell – bass
- Bob Nanna – lead vocals, guitar
- Mike Shumaker – guitar, vocals

Production

- Sean Slade – mixing, engineer, producer
- Paul Q. Kolderie – mixing, engineer, producer
- Adam Taylor – assistant
- Matt Beaudoin – editing
- Emily Lazar – mastering
- Chris Strong – concept photography
- Nicole Radja – band portrait
- Celbee Booth – band portrait
- Gregg Bernstein – art direction, design
