= Midwest emo =

Music subgenre

- Other names: Midwestern emo
- Stylistic origins: Emo; indie rock; math rock
- Cultural origins: 1990s, Midwestern United States
- Typical instruments: Vocals; guitar; bass; drums
- Derivative forms: Emo revival

Other topics
- Post-rock; post-hardcore

Midwest emo (or Midwestern emo) is a subgenre and scene of emo music that emerged in the Midwestern United States during the 1990s. Employing unconventional vocal stylings, distinct guitar riffs and arpeggiated melodies, Midwest emo bands shifted away from the genre's hardcore punk roots and drew on indie rock and math rock approaches. According to the author and critic Andy Greenwald, "this was the period when emo earned many, if not all, of the stereotypes that have lasted to this day: boy-driven, glasses-wearing, overly sensitive, overly brainy, chiming-guitar-driven college music." Midwest emo is sometimes used interchangeably with second-wave emo, and when referenced as a genre is often conflated with indie emo or post-emo indie rock. While Midwest emo was initially associated specifically within the region, its sound and aesthetic gradually spread beyond that boundary. The style was adopted by artists across the United States and internationally.

== Characteristics ==
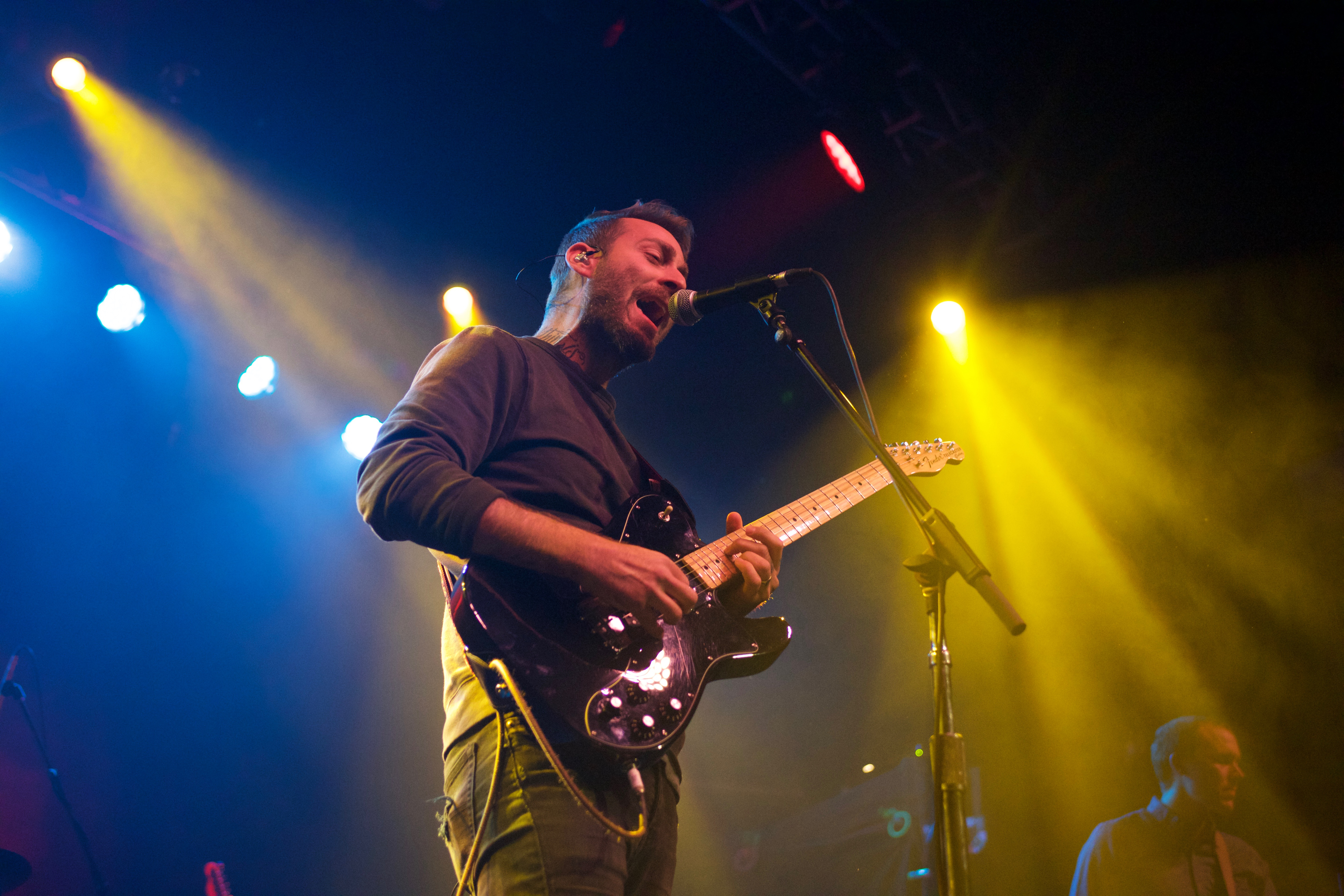
American Football merged Midwest emo with elements of jazz and math rock

According to The Chicago Reader critic Leor Galil, the second-wave bands of the Midwest emo scene "transformed the angular fury of D.C. emo into something malleable, melodic, and cathartic—its common features included cycling guitar parts, chugging bass lines, and unconventional singing that sounded like a sweet neighbor kid with no vocal training but plenty of heart." According to Loudwire, midwest emo is sometimes incorrectly believed to be the sound of emo's first wave: "Depending on who you ask, we are currently on either our fourth or fifth wave of emo music. [...] Midwest emo is widely considered to be the second wave of emo. The first wave of emo music had a punk lean."

Incorporating elements from indie rock, the genre also features "gloomy chord progressions" and arpeggiated guitar melodies, which according to The Post, results in "a much less intense version of emo." Midwest emo is also commonly associated with the use of math rock elements, which were utilized by 1990s bands such as Sunny Day Real Estate and American Football to "create the backbone" of the subgenre. Texas Is the Reason guitarist Norman Brannon has stated that the 1993 albums The Problem with Me by Seam, In on the Kill Taker by Fugazi, and On the Mouth by Superchunk were particularly influential, having been "name-checked by every second-wave emo band I knew." Post-hardcore band Jawbox also impacted the sound of Midwest emo, being cited as an influence by such bands as Braid, Elliott, the Jazz June, and Boys Life.

The definable traits of the Midwest emo have proven to be easily fused with other genres of underground independent music. Revival bands including The World Is a Beautiful Place & I Am No Longer Afraid to Die mixed the Midwestern emo sound with genres such as post-rock and orchestral music. Other outfits, including Patterns Make Sunrise, The Pennikurvers, and Everyone Asked About You, introduced elements of twee pop and indie pop into the sound of Midwest emo. This proved influential to the aforementioned emo revival scene, with groups like Dowsing and Empire! Empire! (I Was a Lonely Estate) taking a similar approach. Midwest emo has also been described as a "whole band potluck" with several bands bringing in experimental sounds to develop the genre. The result is "a musical casserole of introspective lyrics, DIY sprinkles, and heartfelt garnishes that cooked up the signature Midwest Emo scene, where everyone brought their own instruments to the party". This style of shared sound and experimentation in the scene helped to develop the scene in the Midwest, where many alternative people feel there is a lack of culture.

== History ==
=== Precursors (1983–1991) ===
As early as 1983, Squirrel Bait from Louisville, Kentucky were creating what PunkNews called "early Midwestern emotional hardcore" noting "their influence can be heard in many contemporary pop-punk and emo bands". AllMusic writer Steve Huey credited their music as "foreshadow[ing] the intense prog-punk that would become one wing of the emo movement". The same year, Honor Role were formed in Indiana, the band played a major part in the establishing of the Chicago hardcore and emo scene. The band was later based in Richmond, Virginia, in reference to which Spin writer Andrew Beaujon noted the band "happened a little too early and a little too far south", to enter into traditional emo canon.

Articles of Faith's posthumously released In This Life (1987) was Chicago's first emo record. Previously playing a conventional hardcore punk sound, the album saw the band experimenting with introspective lyrics and elements of indie rock, and would go on to influence the rise of emo and indie rock in the city. AllMusic credited it as "kick-starting the emocore sound".

Louisville band Slint created experimental music that Spin called "King Crimson gone emo", they left an influence upon the subsequent fusion of emo and math rock.

=== Origins and popularity (1991–2000) ===
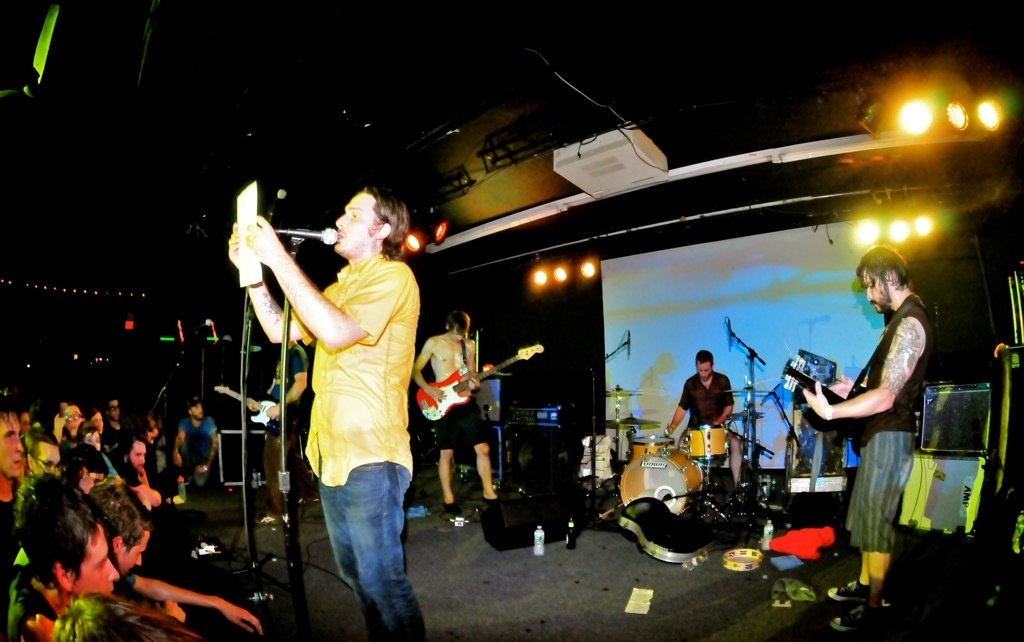
Cap'n Jazz in 2010

In the western suburbs of Chicago, particularly Downers Grove, Illinois, an emo scene formed in the early 1990s, centred around Shakefork Records, including the bands Ivy League, Friction and Manneqvin Hand. The earliest of these bands was Gauge, who created a distinct, Midwestern take upon emo that was informed by hard rock and was the beginning of the Midwest emo genre, making use of elements of math rock in order to create tension. By 1994, the Midwest emo scene had begun to gain significant attention, largely due to their influence, inspiring the sounds of Braid, Cap'n Jazz, Joan of Arc and the Promise Ring. That same year Gauge disbanded.

Braid was as an important act to propel the Midwest emo sound across the United States. At the same time, some first wave emo bands within the Midwest began to change their style in favor of the new Midwest emo style, including Falling Forward, who became Elliot; and Split Lip who became Chamberlain. According to critic Jason Heller, 1996 saw the release of a number of "influential, epochal emo albums," including Christie Front Drive's self-titled debut, Chamberlain's Fate's Got a Driver, and Braid's The Age of Octeen.

The Midwest emo scene came to prominence starting in the late-1990s as notable additional bands including Cursive, Rainer Maria, and the Get Up Kids, released their debuts. According to Andy Greenwald, "this was the period when emo earned many, if not all, of the stereotypes that have lasted to this day: boy-driven, glasses-wearing, overly sensitive, overly brainy, chiming-guitar-driven college music."

The Promise Ring's music took a slower, smoother, pop punk approach to riffs, blending them with singer Davey von Bohlen's imagist lyrics delivered in a froggy croon and pronounced lisp and playing shows in basements and VFW halls. Jade Tree released their debut album, 30° Everywhere, in 1996; it sold tens of thousands of copies and was successful by independent standards. The Get Up Kids sold over 15,000 copies of their debut album, Four Minute Mile (1997), before signing with Vagrant. The label promoted them aggressively, sending them on tours opening for Green Day and Weezer. Their 1999 album, Something to Write Home About, reached number 31 on Billboard's Top Heatseekers chart.

American Football were one of the most defining bands of the late 1990s Midwest emo scene and subgenre. The band created a distinct sound by merging emo with jaggling guitars and elements of jazz, pop, math rock and slowcore. One distinct technique of their music was the use of "twinkly" guitar, an element which has led to genre label "twinkle emo" or "twinkle daddies". Some other Midwest emo bands began embracing elements of post-rock and noise rock, in the case of Karate, the Van Pelt, Joan of Arc and the Shyness Clinic.

Starting in 1999, Midwest emo experienced a brief brush with notoriety as publications such as Spin released articles on the scene. Guitar World ran Jim DeRogatis' article "Emo (The Genre That Dare Not Speak Its Name)," which featured quotes from the Promise Ring's Jason Gnewikow, Braid's Bob Nanna, Jimmy Eat World's Jim Adkins, and Burning Airlines' J. Robbins, while Spin Magazine included the Promise Ring's Very Emergency and Rainer Maria's Look Now Look Again on their list of the twenty best albums of 1999. That same year, K-tel released Nowcore! The Punk Rock Evolution, a CD compilation which included tracks by scene staples such as Braid and the Promise Ring.

According to scholar Peter Trigg, second wave emo ended in the year 2000.

=== Revival (2007–2019) ===
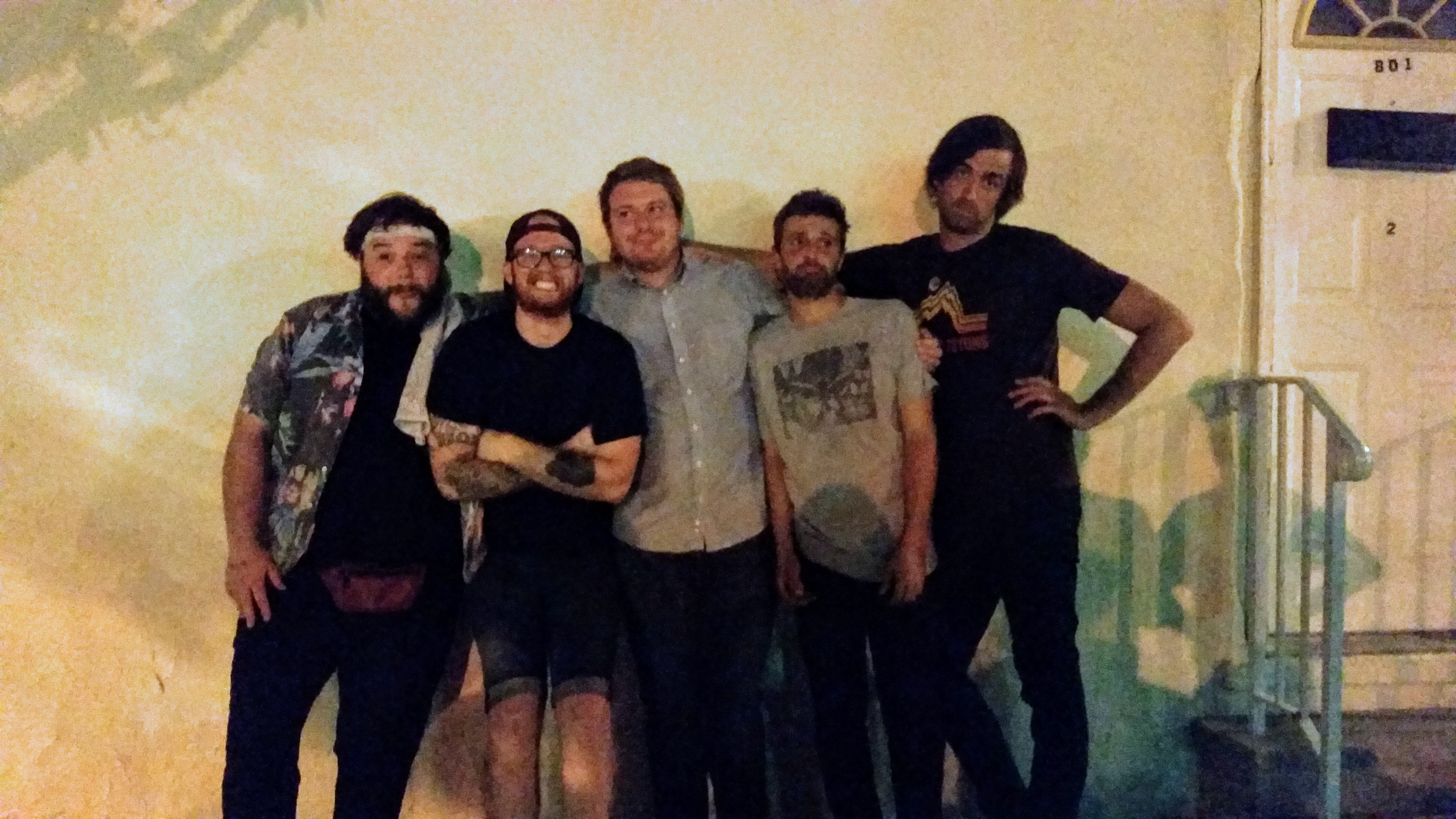
Algernon Cadwallader pioneered a Midwest emo revival in the late 2000s

In the mid-to late 2000s, a revival of the Midwest emo sound was spearheaded by the Pennsylvania-based groups Tigers Jaw, Glocca Morra, Snowing and Algernon Cadwallader and the English band TTNG. Under their influence, underground emo scenes formed across the United States in such localities as West Virginia, Willimantic, Connecticut and Chicago. Notable fourth-wave acts from the Chicago scene included Into It. Over It., CSTVT, Pet Symmetry, Joie de Vivre, Their / They're / There, Lifted Bells, Camping in Alaska, Oliver Houston, and Dowsing. Fourth-wave emo had become a fully-realised movement by 2011. Philadelphia's scene remained prominent throughout the wave, contributing bands such as Everyone Everywhere, Modern Baseball, Hop Along, Jank, Balance and Composure, and mewithoutYou.

By 2013, the Midwest emo revival had become a dominant force in underground music. The year saw high profile releases by Balance and Composure, Brave Bird, Crash of Rhinos, Foxing, the Front Bottoms, Little Big League and the World Is a Beautiful Place & I Am No Longer Afraid to Die. During the movement, various emo bands from the 1990s and early 2000s have reunited for reunion tours or permanent reunions American Football and the Get-Up Kids.

By the mid-2010s, many Midwest emo revival bands had begun experimenting considerably with their sound, creating music less indebted to the 1990s emo bands that defined the fourth wave's early years and instead morphing the style towards what many critics began to call post-emo. As early as 2015, Vice writer Ian Cohen referenced the end of the emo revival and the beginning of the post-emo era with the release of the World Is a Beautiful Place & I Am No Longer Afraid to Die's second album Harmlessness, while BrooklynVegan writer Andrew Sacher recalled the same sentiment retrospectively in 2021 about Foxing's 2018 third album Nearer My God. By the end of the decade many of the most influential bands in fourth wave emo had disbanded: Modern Baseball in 2017, Title Fight in 2018 and Balance and Composure in 2019.

=== Continued interest (2020–present) ===
In the 2020s, Midwest emo became a meme on TikTok with videos parodying the genre's stylings. This includes the use of long naming schemes, relationships, and poor singing quality. Also at the beginning of the 2020s, developments started leading towards a revival of a more rawer, screamo and second-wave emo oriented sound inspired by prior releases from earlier bands such as Oakwood; with west-coast bands including Vs Self, Train Breaks Down, and Circa 40 gaining underground popularity primarily through word-of-mouth as well as online platforms like TikTok.

During the mid-2020s, many emo bands moved away from the experimentalism that defined the fifth-wave of emo, instead reviving the Midwest emo revival sound. This included 2010s bands Ogbert the Nerd and Oolong, as well as new bands such as Pomfret. Around 2025, many prominent fifth-wave emo bands disbanded or pivoted their styles away from emo.

== See also ==
- List of Midwest emo bands
- Math rock
- Midwestern United States
- Post-rock
