= Bob Nanna =

American musician (born 1975)

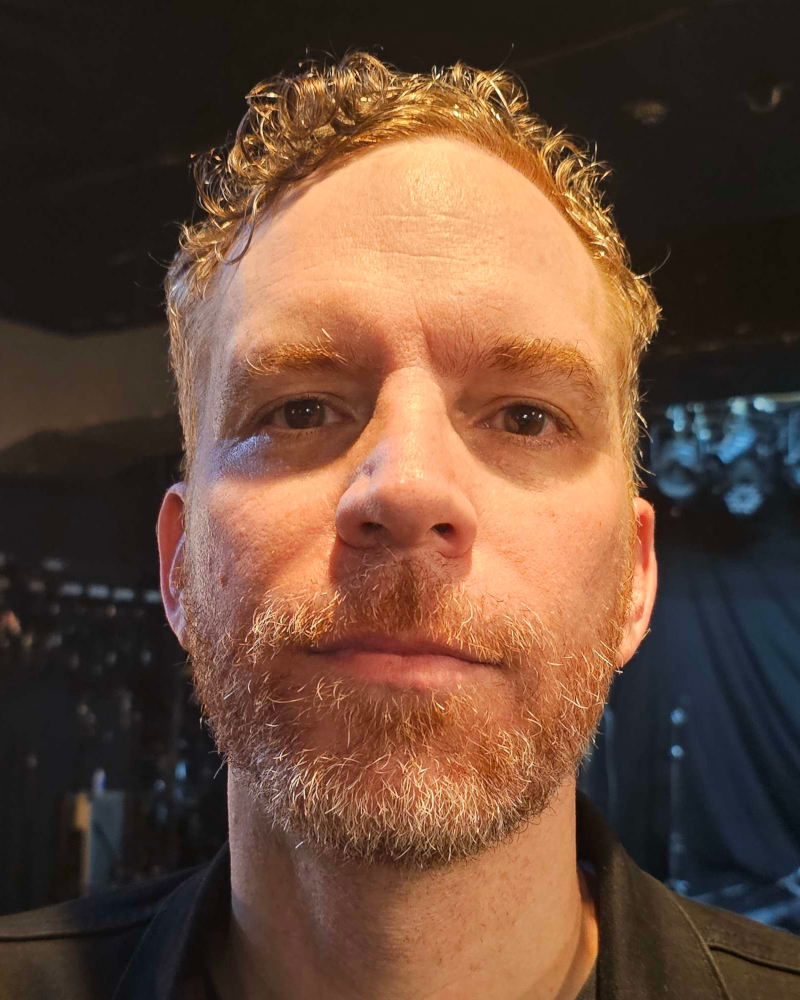

Background information
- Born: Robert Thomas Nanna; June 14, 1975 (age 51)
- Origin: Chicago, Illinois, United States
- Genres: Alternative rock, indie rock, emo
- Instruments: vocals, guitar, drums
- Years active: 1991–present

Bob Nanna (born June 14, 1975) is an American musician best known as the singer and guitarist for the bands Braid and Hey Mercedes. Nanna also currently performs as part of the band Lifted Bells, as well as solo releases under the handle The City on Film as well as his own name.

== Biography ==
Robert Thomas Nanna was born in Chicago, Illinois. In 1993, Nanna moved to Urbana, Illinois to attend the University of Illinois Urbana-Champaign. Inspired by post-hardcore bands such as Jawbox and Hoover, Nanna founded the band Braid soon after. During their initial run, Braid played a total of 537 shows, and toured with such bands as Jimmy Eat World and The Get Up Kids. Braid released three full-lengths, 1995's Frankie Welfare Boy Age Five, 1996's The Age of Octeen and 1998's Frame & Canvas, before breaking up in 1999. Nanna graduated from the University of Illinois in 1997 with a degree in communications and advertising, in his words, "the easiest [degree] I thought I could do with the least amount of effort."

During his tenure with Braid, Nanna was also part of the short-lived Orwell, playing post-hardcore influenced by Indian Summer and Lync. Nanna subsequently began his solo project The City on Film and formed Hey Mercedes with his Braid bandmates Todd Bell and Damon Atkinson and guitarist Mark Dawursk. From 2000 to 2005, Hey Mercedes released two full-lengths, 2001's Everynight Fire Works and 2003's Loses Control, and shared stages with such bands as the Early November, Armor for Sleep, Piebald, and Hopesfall.

Braid reformed for a reunion tour in 2004. After Hey Mercedes broke up, Nanna played in Certain People I Know, before joining Lifted Bells. In 2013 he co-founded Downwrite, a website for commissioning custom songs, with Mark Rose of the band Spitalfield.

Braid reunited in 2011, releasing the EP Closer to Close soon after, followed by their first full-length since 1998, No Coast in 2014. Hey Mercedes has also played occasional shows, including a 2016 reunion tour.

In 2020, Nanna released his first album under his own name, Celebration States, a largely acoustic album recorded in one day. Orwell released an anthology, Orwell 1995, made up largely of old recordings from that year, in 2020 on Expert Work Records. The anthology was reissued in 2025.

== Influences ==
Nanna has cited numerous bands and artists as influences, including Gauge, Fugazi, Jawbreaker, Blake Schwarzenbach, Bob Dylan, J. Robbins, Will Oldham, and Morrissey.

== Discography ==
=== with Orwell ===
- 1995 (Expert Work, 2020) - LP 2020

=== with Friction ===
- Blurred In Six (Allied, 1993) - LP 1993
- Hours of Operation (Polyvinyl, 2002) - 2xCD 2002

=== with Braid ===
- Frankie Welfare Boy Age Five
- The Age of Octeen
- Frame and Canvas
- Movie Music, Vol. 1
- Movie Music, Vol. 2
- Lucky to Be Alive
- Closer to Closed
- No Coast

=== with Hey Mercedes ===
- Everynight Fire Works (Vagrant)
- Loses Control (Vagrant)

=== with The City On Film ===
- In Formal Introduction (Grand Theft Autumn)
- La Vella (Topshelf, 2014)

=== with The Sky Corvair ===
- The Sky Corvair - Unsafe At Any Speed (Actionboy Records, 2005) CD

=== with Certain People I Know ===
- Certain People I Know - Certain People I Know (Count Your Lucky Stars, 2012)

=== with Lifted Bells ===
- Lifted Bells - Minor Tantrums (Run For Cover, 2018)

=== Singles and EPs ===
- Friction / Cap'n Jazz - 'Nothing Dies with Blue Skies (Shadefork Records, 1994) - single
- Friction - Makeshift (Shadefork Records, 1993) - 3 song 7"
- Braid - Rainsnowmatch (Enclave /Polyvinyl 1993) - EP
- Braid - I'm Afraid of Everything / Radish White Icicle / Now I'm Exhausted (Grand Theft Autumn, 1994) - single
- Braid - Niagara / That Car Came Out Of Nowhere (Grand Theft Autumn, 1994) - single
- Braid - First Day Back / Hugs From Boys (Polyvinyl, 1995) - single
- The City On Film / Kind Of Like Spitting / Sterling Silver - Slowdance Tour (Slowdance, 1998) - EP
- Braid - Please Drive Faster Polyvinyl (1998) - EP
- The City On Film - Two Hour Anniversary (About Midnight, 1997) - 7"
- The City On Film / Kind Of Like Spitting - Split (Sport, 1998) - 7"
- Braid / Eversor / The Lovemen / 3minutemovie - Japan Tour CD (1999) - 3" CD
- Hey Mercedes - Hey Mercedes Polyvinyl, (2000) - EP
- Bob Nanna / Elizabeth Elmore - Bob Nanna/Elizabeth Elmore EP (Troubleman Unlimited, 1999) - EP
- Hey Mercedes - The Weekend (Vagrant, 2003) - single, EP
- Hey Mercedes / Favez - Split (Sound Fiction, 2003) - 7"
- The City On Film - I'd Rather Be Wine Drunk (Post 436, 2004) - EP
- The City On Film / The Novi Split - The Sea Was Angry That Day My Friends (Eat The Fly, 2004) - EP
- Hey Mercedes - Unorchestrated (Grand Theft Autumn, 2005) - EP, compilation
- The City On Film - Little Informal (Grand Theft Autumn, 2005) - EP
- The City On Film - American Diary (Redder, 2005) - EP
- The City on Film / Minus the Bear - Split (Polyvinyl, 2006) - 7"
- The City on Film / Owen - Split (Red Cars Go Faster, 2007) - 7"
- Bob Nanna & Lauren Lo / Into It Over It - "Split" (Evil Weevil, 2010) - 7"
- Braid / Balance and Composure - "Split" (No Sleep, 2013) - 7"
- Lifted Bells - s/t EP (Naked Ally, 2013) - 12" EP
- Lifted Bells - "Lights Out" (Naked Ally, 2014) - 7"
- Braid "Kids Get Grids" (Topshelf, 2015) - Record Store Day Exclusive 7"
- Lifted Bells - "Overreactor" (Run For Cover, 2016) - 12" EP

=== Compilations ===
- Various - Direction (Polyvinyl) - Braid - "I'm Glowing and You're The Reason"
- Various - Direction (Polyvinyl) - Orwell - "Angular Momentum" (guest artist)
- Various - My Pal God Holiday Record (My Pal God, 1997) - The City On Film - "Fairytale Of New York"
- Various - World Domination in Thirteen Easy Steps (Stratagem, 1998) - Braid - "Collect From Clark Kent"
- Various - Where Is My Mind? A Tribute To The Pixies (Glue Factory, 1998) - Braid - "Trompe Le Monde"
- Various - Another Year On The Streets Vol. 2 (Vagrant, 2001) - Hey Mercedes - " Our Weekend Starts On Wednesday"
- Friction - Hours of Operation: Discography, 1991-1993 Polyvinyl (2004) - compilation
- Various - THICK: Oil (Thick, 2003) - The City On Film - "Lost My Lights (acoustic)"
- Various - In The Film They Made Us A Little More Articulate (Escape Goat, 2003) - The City On Film - "Bad Liver And A Broken Heart"
- Various - My Favorite Songwriters (Five One Inc., 2004) - The City On Film - "I'd Rather Be Wine Drunk (demo)"
- Various - Polyvinyl Does Polyvinyl (Polyvinyl, 2016) - Braid- "Next of Kin"
- Various - Planet Home Series Vol 2. (Arctic Rodeo, 2017) - Bob Nanna - "Valparaiso / Smallpox Champion"

=== Miscellaneous ===
- Various - Exquisite Corpse (Polyvinyl) - "So Much To See"
- Various - The Actuality Of Thought (Bifocal Media, 2001) -- live footage of Braid's "What A Wonderful Puddle" - VHS
- Hubcap - Those Kids Are Weirder LP/CD (Actionboy, 1996 54'40 Or Fight!, reissue 2001)
- Bob Nanna - Threadless Songs LP (Self-released, 2014)

== See also ==
- Braid
- Hey Mercedes
- The City on Film
