= Braid discography =

- Studio albums: 4
- Extended plays: 3
- Live albums: 1
- Compilation albums: 2
- Singles: 4
- Video albums: 1

The discography for the American emo band Braid consists of four studio albums, five split 7-inch vinyl EPs, four 7-inch vinyl singles, and one home video release.

== Studio albums ==
Year	Title	Record label
1995	Frankie Welfare Boy Age 5	Divot
1996	The Age of Octeen	Mud
1998	Frame & Canvas	Polyvinyl
2014	No Coast	Topshelf

== Live albums ==
Year	Title	Record label
2000	Lucky to Be Alive	Glue Factory

== Compilation albums ==
Year	Title	Record label
2000	Movie Music, Vol. 1	Polyvinyl
2000	Movie Music, Vol. 2	Polyvinyl

== Singles/EPs ==
Year	Title	Record label
1994	Rainsnowmatch	Enclave
1996	I'm Afraid Of Everything	Grand Theft Autumn / Polyvinyl
1997	"Niagra"	Grand Theft Autumn
1997	"First Day Back"	Polyvinyl
1999	"Please Drive Faster"	Polyvinyl
2011	Closer to Closed	Polyvinyl
2015	"Kids Get Grids"	Topshelf

== Split releases ==
Year	Title	Record label
1996	The Get Up Kids / Braid	Tree
1996	Braid / Beezus	Mud
1996	Braid / Pohgoh	New Granada
1997	Braid / Corm	Polyvinyl
1998	Braid / Burning Airlines	DeSoto
1999	Braid / Eversor / Lovemen / Three Minute Movie	Snuffy Smile
2013	Braid / Balance and Composure	Polyvinyl

== Videography ==
Year	Title	Notes	Record label
2001	Killing a Camera	VHS documentary of the band's last 5 shows together in August 1999. Re-released on DVD in 2004 with bonus content.	BiFocal Media
