= Hey Mercedes =

US musical group

- Origin: Milwaukee/Illinois, United States
- Genres: Emo, pop punk, pop rock
- Years active: 1999–2005, 2007, 2016–2017, 2025-
- Labels: Polyvinyl, Vagrant
- Spinoff of: Braid
- Members: Damon Atkinson; Todd Bell; Bob Nanna; Michael Shumaker
- Past members: Mark Dawursk

Hey Mercedes is an alternative rock band from Milwaukee, Wisconsin and Chicago, Illinois, United States, formed after the dissolution of Braid by its former members Bob Nanna, Todd Bell, and Damon Atkinson.

== History ==
=== Early years and Everynight Fire Works (1999–2002) ===
In June 1999, Braid announced they would be breaking up, and played their last shows that August. While guitarist Chris Broach remained active in music focusing his attention on the Firebird Band, Braid's remaining former members spent some time at home. Toward the end of 1999, those members reconvened and formed Hey Mercedes: Bob Nanna, Damon Atkinson, and Todd Bell returned as lead vocalist, drummer, and bassist, respectively. After auditioning two people, former Alligator Gun guitarist Mark Dawursk completed the band's lineup in April 2000, and the band began practicing that month. The members lived in separate cities between Chicago, Illinois and Milwaukee, Wisconsin; Nanna had to travel from Chicago to Milwaukee to practice during weekdays, only to return home the following morning to work at his job. In spite of these busy schedules, the band still managed to work on material.

Not long after Dawursk joined, the group recorded a four-track EP. Although they had planned to self-release it, the band had no money to fund that endeavor. They eventually shopped it to different labels, eventually drawing interest from Polyvinyl Record Co. founder Matt Lunsford, who offered to release it. The band accepted Lunsford's offer, and prior to its release, drummer Damon Atkinson was contacted by independent label Vagrant Records, who congratulated the band on the EP. In August, the group played their first show, and the self-titled EP was released in September 2000. It showcased a mix of the syncopated drum parts of Braid with a more melodic structure, highlighted by Nanna's different vocal approach than that which was shown with Braid. Long-time connections in the American emo scene enabled the band to tour with the likes of Alkaline Trio, Saves the Day and Jets to Brazil.

In December 2000, Hey Mercedes traveled to California to play a string of shows. While there, they met with Vagrant founder Rich Egan; they signed to the label at the end of the month. On March 2, 2001, the band demoed 15 tracks for potential inclusion on their debut album, and followed this with a brief US tour, with Dashboard Confessional appearing on all dates. The Anniversary supported the first half, and Hot Rod Circuit covered the second half. The album was recorded over a period of about two weeks in April, beginning on April 13 and finishing on April 27. They recorded their debut album with Burning Airlines member J. Robbins as the producer, who had previously produced Braid's final album Frame & Canvas (1998). Although Frame & Canvas was recorded and mixed in only five days, the band had a bigger budget to work on Hey Mercedes' and thus took more time to produce the record.

Although initially slated for a July release, Vagrant entered legal trouble with another label of the same name who attempted to trademark "Vagrant", and the former label's website was taken down. The album, whose title was revealed to be Everynight Fire Works, was delayed as a result. Further problems with distribution delayed the album further to late October. Everynight Fire Works was eventually released on October 23, 2001, through Vagrant Records. In November and December, the group went on tour with Saves the Day and Thursday. In 2001 alone, they performed 114 shows.

Nanna, Atkinson and Bell eventually grew dissatisfied with Dawursk's presence in the group, and subsequently parted ways with the guitarist. They announced his departure in February 2002; he was temporarily replaced by Sean O'Brien, who previously played with Nanna in Orwell. Atkinson spent some time touring with Saves the Day as their temporary drummer, returning in early March. They played the occasional US show throughout March 2002, with one date in Japan in the middle. Michael Shumaker of Sheilbound, became the band's new guitarist in May. Companion EP The Weekend, made up of leftover tracks from the Every Night Fire Works sessions, was released in July. The band were due to film a music video for "Our Weekend Starts on Wednesday" during the same month, however, the shoot was cancelled; an alternative version of the song which was supposed to appear in the video later surfaced. Starting that July, the group went on a US tour over the course of six weeks with Piebald, Audio Learning Center, and Koufax. In October, the band performed at the Grand Rapids Skate Fest. In all, Everynight Fire Works was promoted with over 200 shows.

=== Later years: Loses Control and disbandment (2002–2005) ===
During the previous April and May, Hey Mercedes spent time writing new material. After finishing the touring cycle for Everynight Fire Works in October, the band spent two weeks in Spread Eagle, Wisconsin writing new material. In February and March 2003, the band embarked on a headlining US tour with support from Armor for Sleep, Breaking Pangaea and Panic in Detroit. During this stint, they performed several of the new songs they had written.

During that tour, Hey Mercedes revamped their website to promote their second album Loses Control, which was due for release towards the end of the year. Loses Control was recorded in April and May 2003 at Camp Street Studios in Cambridge, Massachusetts, this time choosing producers Sean Slade and Paul Q. Kolderie. Slade and Kolderie were familiar with the band's work, and took a meticulous approach on the guitar sounds, noting specifically which guitars were needed for a certain part in each song. Nanna described the general sound of these guitars as "really layered - they just sound big and fat." Although the record was scheduled for release on September 2, Hey Mercedes once again faced an album delay, and it was eventually released on October 7 through Vagrant. "Quality Revenge at Last", "It's Been a Blast" and "Knowing When to Stop" were all leaked before the album's release.

The band was set to appear on the CMJ tour that November, however, due to complications, the band instead went on a headlining North American trek in November and December, dubbed the Hurry Up Offense Tour. The first half of the dates were supported by JamisonParker and Jet by Day; the remaining shows were supported by Hopesfall, Bear vs. Shark, Haste and Jude the Obscure.

A split single with Favez was released through UK label Sound Fiction that November. Hey Mercedes contributed the tracks "Quality Revenge at Last" and "Warm Chords". A music video for "Quality Revenge at Last" premiered on MTV.com on November 24, directed by Matt Barry and Maureen Egan. It was filmed in a day and features the band going through a car wash; as a result of this, the members believe they contracted pneumonia. In February 2004, the group went on tour with Wheat; partway through it their touring van broken down, resulting in them dropping off two shows.

In March, the band toured with the Early November, Spitalfield and Limbeck, followed shortly by a support slot for Saves the Day and Grandaddy on their co-headlining tour in March and April. When one of the other support acts, the Fire Theft, dropped off the tour, Hey Mercedes were given a longer time to perform.

After this extensive tour cycle, the band members began pursuing projects outside of Hey Mercedes. In May, Nanna went on a solo tour; he joined Atkinson and Bell for some Braid reunion shows between May and July. In October, Hey Mercedes went on a tour of Europe, and decided to take time to rest after this string of shows ended. The break would prove permanent, as on January 20, 2005, the band announced they would be breaking up; they later played their final show in April. Outtakes and demos from the album's sessions were released on the Unorchestrated EP in May through independent label Grand Theft Autumn.

=== Post-break up (2006–present) ===
Hey Mercedes group performed two shows in September 2007, alongside a performance at the Chicago Threadless store. Unorchestrated was pressed on vinyl through Hobbledehoy Record Co and Grand Theft Autumn in August 2008. The band remains inactive, but plays occasional shows.

In early 2009 lead singer Nanna confirmed via Twitter that a new band with drummer Atkinson is in the works. The band will be somewhat the same style as Hey Mercedes.

In 2016, it was announced that the band would perform at the Wrecking Ball festival in Atlanta, Georgia. They followed this up with a 15th anniversary tour for Everynight Fire Works in the US July and August; the album was re-released to coincide with it. A Japanese leg was undertaken in early 2017.

In March 2025, it was announced that the band would reunite for the Best Friends Forever festival in Las Vegas, Nevada (October 10–12, 2025).

In January 2026, it was announced that the band would once again reunite, alongside a reissue of their complete discography on vinyl and a UK tour opening for Braid in July. They would play their first shows in the Midwest in 10 years in January, followed by a tour of Japan in March and April. Hey Mercedes also joined Jimmy Eat World to open for a select few shows of their tour in June.

== Members ==
Current members

- Bob Nanna – lead vocals, rhythm guitar (1999–2005, 2007, 2016–2017, 2025–present)
- Todd Bell – bass guitar (1999–2005, 2007, 2016–2017, 2025–present)
- Damon Atkinson – drums (1999–2005, 2007, 2016–2017, 2025–present)
- Michael Shumaker – lead guitar (2002–2005, 2007, 2016–2017, 2025–present)

Former members

- Mark Dawursk – lead guitar (2000–2002)

== Discography ==
Studio albums

| Title | Details |
|---|---|
| Everynight Fire Works | Released: October 23, 2001; Label: Vagrant; Format: CD, CS, DL, LP |
| Loses Control | Released: October 7, 2003; Label: Vagrant; Format: CD, DL, LP |

Extended plays

| Title | Details |
|---|---|
| Hey Mercedes | Released: September 12, 2000; Label: Polyvinyl; Format: CD, DL, 12-inch vinyl |
| The Weekend | Released: July 16, 2002; Label: Vagrant; Format: CD, DL |
| Hey Mercedes + Favez – A Split Seven Inch Release | Released: November 19, 2002; Label: Sound Fiction; Format: 7-inch vinyl |
| Unorchestrated | Released: May 10, 2005; Label: Grand Theft Autumn; Format: CD, DL, 12-inch vinyl |

Compilation albums

| Title | Details |
|---|---|
| Hey Mercedes / Unorchestrated | Released: March 27, 2026; Label: Polyvinyl; Format: 12-inch vinyl |

Music videos

| Title | Year | Director(s) |
|---|---|---|
| "Quality Revenge at Last" | 2003 | Matt Barry and Maureen Egan |
