= Hopelessly Incapable of Standing in the Way =

Studio album by Spain Colored Orange
- Released: November 22, 2005
- Genre: indie rock indie pop jazz
- Length: 33:48
- Label: Lucid Records

Spain Colored Orange chronology
Hopelessly Incapable of Standing in the Way (2005)	Sneaky Like a Villain (2009)

Hopelessly Incapable of Standing in the Way is the debut CD/EP by Spain Colored Orange released in 2005. It preceded their first full-length album, Sneaky Like a Villain, on the label Shout it Out Loud Music.

Spain Colored Orange combines a variety of musical genres, including indie rock, indie pop, '70s rock, psychedelic rock, and jazz.

== Track listing ==
1. "Momentary Drama" - 5:09
2. "Maybe It's True" - 6:54
3. "Let It Go" - 4:02
4. "Remember One Thing" - 4:02
5. "Persistent Intermission" - 3:37
6. "Will You Catch On" - 4:45
7. "I Kid You Not" - 5:16

== Personnel ==
- Gilbert Alfaro - (vocals/piano/synth)
- Eric Jackson - (trumpet/organ)
- Randy Platt - (guitars)
- Steve Burnett - (bass)
- James Diederich - (drums)
- Justin Peak - (keys/production)
- Bill Matney - guest percussionist

== Awards ==
2006 Houston Press Music Awards:

- Album of the year
