= Lucky to Be Alive =

Lucky to Be Alive may refer to:

- Lucky to Be Alive (Braid album), 2000
- Lucky to Be Alive (Confederate Railroad album), 2016
