= The City on Film =

The City on Film is the official name of Bob Nanna's solo act.

== History ==
Nanna began solo recordings in 1997 during the off-time between Braid tours. These recordings began to accumulate, and in May 2004 he recorded I'd Rather Be Wine Drunk (his first solo EP) in a Salt Lake City hotel room during a Hey Mercedes tour. Thus far, he has released three EPs, an LP, and a 7" vinyl, and several split EPs.

"Forgiveness" was posted online as a free MP3 in anticipation of the band's upcoming debut. In Formal Introduction was released on June 21, 2005, through the label Grand Theft Autumn. It was promoted with a full-band tour running into July, which was co-headlined with Rescue, and an appearance at the Smashachusetts festival. Following this, Nana embarked on a solo UK tour with Owen in July and August 2005. The City on Film then toured the Midwest with Spitalfield in November 2005.

In January 2007, Nanna went to Seattle to record a number of songs at Red Room, with the intention of releasing a double-disc set of 30 to 60 tracks. Later that year, the Hobbledehoy Record Co. reissued In Formal Introduction in Australia with bonus tracks. Nanna toured that country in August 2007 and then the UK; Owen appeared on the latter leg.

== Musical style ==
The City on Film's sound is generally lighter, slower, and more cerebral than that of either Braid or Hey Mercedes. There are several lyrical connections and similarities across all three acts (e.g. in Hey Mercedes' "Frowning of a Lifetime", the line the lady's a raven / new Elenora Fagan compares with our baby will be a raven / we'll name her Elenora Fagan from The City on Film's "How a Helicopter Sounds").

== Discography ==
=== Albums / LPs ===
- In Formal Introduction (Grand Theft Autumn, 2005) - LP
- In Formal Introduction - Australian Edition (Hobbledehoy, 2007) - CD
- La Vella (Topshelf Records, 2014)

=== Singles and EPs ===
- The City on Film / Kind of Like Spitting / Sterling Silver - Slowdance Tour (Slowdance, 1998) - EP
- Two Hour Anniversary (About Midnight, 1999) - 7"
- The City on Film / Kind Of Like Spitting - Split (Sport, 1999) - 7"
- I'd Rather Be Wine Drunk (Post 436, 2004) - EP
- The City on Film / Novi Split - The Sea Was Angry That Day My Friends (Eat The Fly, 2004) - EP
- The City on Film - Little Informal (Grand Theft Autumn, 2005) - EP
- The City on Film - American Diary (Redder, 2005) - EP
- The City on Film / Minus the Bear Split 7" (Polyvinyl)
- The City on Film / Owen Split 7" (Red Cars Go Faster)
