= Friendships Often Fade Away =

Studio album by Audio Learning Center
- Released: February 26, 2002
- Recorded: June 2000 – June 2001
- Genres: Post-punk, alternative rock
- Length: 57:00
- Label: Vagrant
- Producers: Adam Kasper, Christopher Brady

Audio Learning Center chronology
Friendships Often Fade Away (2002)	Cope Park (2004)

Professional ratings
Review scores
Source	Rating
AllMusic	4/5 stars
Los Angeles Times	2.5/4 stars
Pittsburgh Post-Gazette	3.5/4 stars
Punknews.org	4/5 stars

Friendships Often Fade Away is the debut album by the American post-punk band Audio Learning Center, released in 2002 through Vagrant Records.

== Critical reception ==
The Pitch wrote that singer "[Christopher] Brady’s most effective material recalls mournful tales of souls haunted by tainted love and shattered pasts."

== Track listing ==
All lyrics are written by Christopher E. Brady; all music is composed by Christopher E. Brady, Steven Birch, Paul Johnson.

No.	Title	Length
1.	"The Shell"	4:51
2.	"Hand Me Downs"	5:05
3.	"Favorite"	3:20
4.	"Winter"	7:03
5.	"The Dream"	4:54
6.	"A Dedication"	1:41
7.	"Broken"	5:07
8.	"Prescription"	5:59
9.	"December"	1:18
10.	"If You Choose"	5:45
11.	"I Love Robot"	11:57
Total length:		57:00

Hidden track
No.	Title	Length
1.	"untitled"	2:56

== Personnel ==
Audio Learning Center

- Christopher E. Brady – Lead vocals, bass, art direction, engineer, producer
- Steven Birch – Guitar, backing vocals art direction, design, layout design, wurlitzer
- Paul Johnson – Drums, percussion

Artwork

- Rick Boston – Cover painting
- Marc Trunz – Artwork

Production

- Adam Kasper – Producer, engineer, mixing
- Adam Ayan – Mastering
- Rob Bartleson – Assistant Engineer
- Dave Friedlander – Engineer
- Sam Hofstedt – Engineer
- John McBain – Engineer
- Lars Fox – Pro-Tools
- Sean Cox – Technical Assistance
- Greg Keplinger – Technical Assistance
