= Mock Orange (band) =

American indie rock band

- Origin: Evansville, Indiana, U.S.
- Genres: Indie rock, emo, punk rock
- Years active: 1993–present
- Labels: Wednesday Records, Topshelf Records
- Members: Ryan Grisham; Heath Metzger; Joe Asher; Zach Grace

Mock Orange is an American indie rock band from Evansville, Indiana, United States. They debuted in 1998 during a growing emo and punk musical climate.

== Overview ==
The first album released by Mock Orange was “Nines & Sixes” in 1998. In 2000, the band followed up with “The Record Play.” Produced by Mark Trombino (Pinback, Jimmy Eat World).

In 2002, just after the release of the "First EP", the band's label, Dead Droid Records, was sued by George Lucas for copyright infringement. The suit resulted in the collapse of the label.

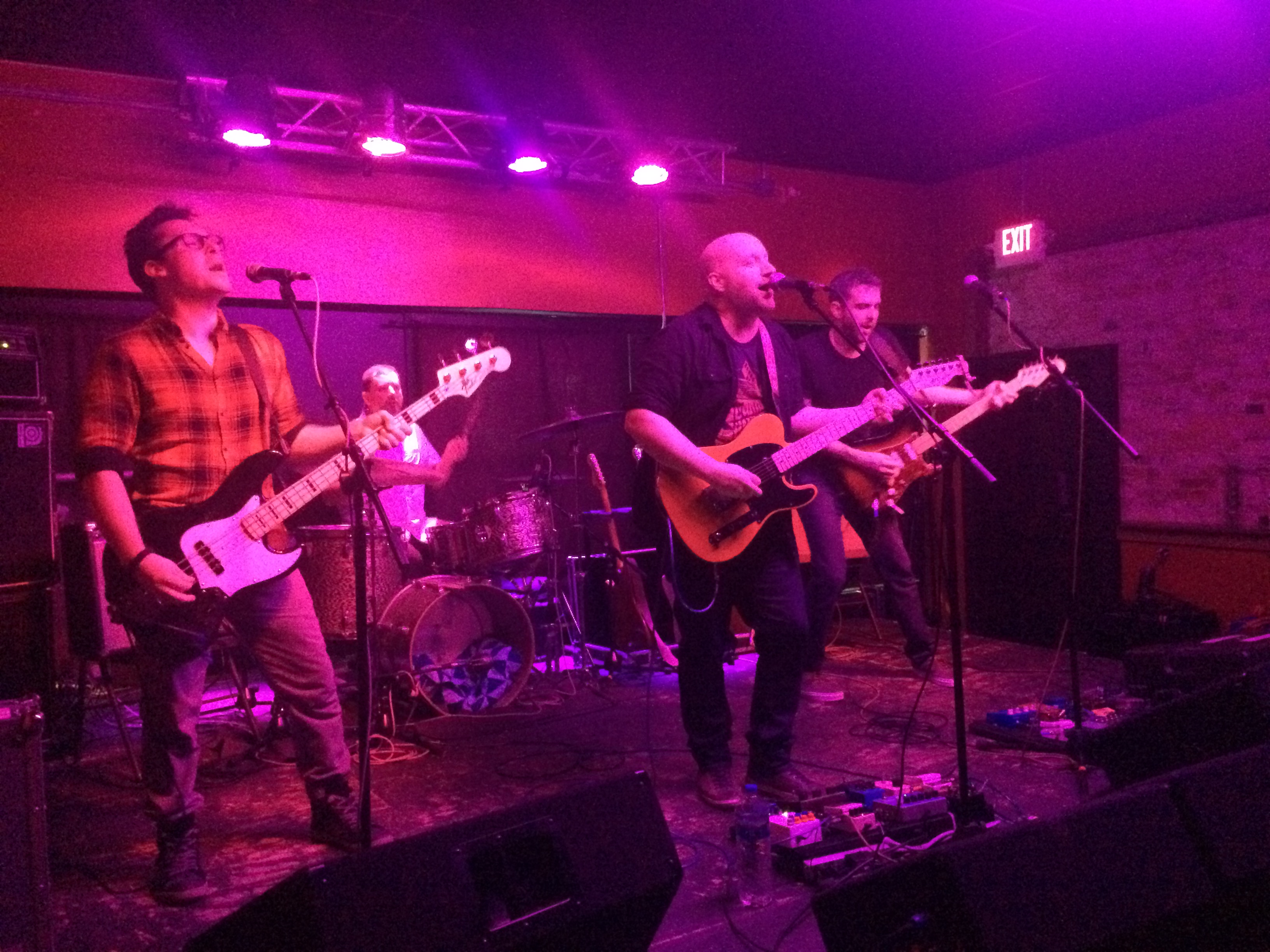
Mock Orange performs Aug. 10, 2016, at The Bishop Bar in Bloomington, Indiana.

After this, Mock Orange returned to the studio, this time with producer J. Robbins (Dismemberment Plan, The Promise Ring). During this time the band performed alongside bands like Rogue Wave, Ted Leo, and Minus the Bear, and had live appearances on MTV2 and songs on shows like CSI Miami, MTV's Real World and ESPN.

On September 9, 2008, Wednesday Records released Mock Orange's Captain Love. The record was recorded over the better part of a year in Nashville, Tennessee with producer Jeremy Ferguson (Be Your Own Pet, Josh Rouse). Punctuated by the engaging artwork of Kathleen Lolley (My Morning Jacket's Z).

Mock Orange have also developed a significant following in Japan, touring the country five times with Japanese band, The Band Apart and releasing a split EP titled Daniels EP. 2006 also saw the band making their European debut, touring in Germany, Spain, France and Switzerland. The UK portion of the tour was cancelled after the band's van was broken into in Spain.

Mock Orange released their latest full-length album, Disguised As Ghosts, in 2011 on Wednesday Records. The album was recorded by bassist Zach Grace with Jeremy Ferguson returning to help produce. The album has been released on both CD and vinyl.

In 2016, the band signed with Topshelf Records (Braid, The Jazz June) to release their follow-up to "Disguised As Ghosts". According to Mock Orange's Twitter account, Alan Douches was recruited to master the album in late March. Described as a melding of their two conflicting past sounds, Put The Kid On The Sleepy Horse has a May 20, 2016 release date.

== Band members ==
Current members

- Ryan Grisham – guitar, vocals (1993–present)
- Heath Metzger – drums (1993–present)
- Zach Grace – bass, backing vocals (2002–present)
- Matt McGuyer – guitar, backing vocals (2021–present)

Former members

- Joe Asher – guitar, backing vocals (1993–2021)
- Brandon Chappell – bass (1993–2002)

== Discography ==
=== Albums ===
- Open Sunday (1995, Minus 7)
- Mock Orange (1997, Minus 7)
- Nines & Sixes (1998, Lobster Records)
- The Record Play (2000, Lobster Records)
- Mind is Not Brain (2004, Silverthree)
- Captain Love (2008, Wednesday Records)
- Disguised as Ghosts (2011, Wednesday Records)
- Put the Kid On the Sleepy Horse (2016, Topshelf Records)

=== Live ===
- Live in Brooklyn (2009, Wednesday Records)

=== EPs ===
- The First EP (2002, Dead Droid Records)
- Daniels EP (2006, Asian Gothic)
- Daniels EP 2 (2016, Asian Gothic)
- The Bridge EP (2020, Bedfire Records)

=== Singles ===
- Mock Orange/The Borgo Pass (1999, Northern Lights)

=== Compilations ===
- Lobster Records: Greetings (2001, Lobster Records)
- Firework Anatomy (2001, Engineer Records)
- Not One Light Red: A Desert Extended (2002, Sunset Alliance)
- Rock Music: A Tribute to Weezer (2002, Dead Droid Records)
- Gems (2006, Lobster Records)
- Play (2007, Desoto Records)

== Soundtracks ==
- Tony Hawk's Gigantic SkatePark Tour 2002 - "We Work", "Growing Crooked" 2002
- Scott Baio Is 45...and Single -"Mind is not Brain", "Old Man", "Oh My God", and "Birds"
- Bella - Metanoia Films - "East Side Song" appears in the trailer of the movie 2006
- CSI: Miami - "All You Have", "Drinking Song" and "We Work"
- LEVI's BMX Clip of the Week -"Lila" and "Smile On
- Maloof Money Cup, NBC -"Song in D" and "Supergang"
- 16 and Pregnant MTV - "I Keep Saying So Long" 2009
- Raising The Bar TNT - "Captain Love" 2009
- Greek, ABC Family -"Smile On"
- MTV's Made - "Drinking Song"
- Vh1's Free Radio - "Smile On"
- Viva La Bam - Five Songs
- MTV's College Life - Seven Songs
- MTV's Maui Fever - Six Songs
- MTV's There and Back - Three Songs
- MTV's Real World
- Fox Sports
- ESPN2
- Past Life Warner Bros.
- The Vicious Kind Movie trailer-"Song in D" 72nd Street Productions

== Contests ==
- The Mt. Dew Break Out Contest MTV2 - performed live, placed second
- International Songwriting Competition - placed first in Rock category
