= Spain Colored Orange =

US musical group

- Genres: Indie rock, indie pop, jazz, psychedelic rock
- Years active: 2000–present
- Labels: Lucid Records (2005–2008); Shout It Out Loud Music
- Members: Gilbert Alfaro; Will Evans; Jared Arceneaux; Coy Matula; Jake Allen
- Past members: Keith Palumbo; Erica Cruz; James Diederich; Justin Peak; Mikey Deleon; Randy Platt; Ryan Chavez; Steven Burnett; Steve Torres; Mike Dugat; Ben Jarrad

Spain Colored Orange is an indie rock band from Houston, Texas. The group formed in 2000, was signed by Lucid Records from 2005 to 2008 and then represented by Shout It Out Loud Music through 2012. They are currently with Diverse Chorus Records. Their sound has been characterized as a blend of indie rock and indie pop with elements of psychedelic rock, '70s rock, swing and jazz.

Known for energetic live performances, Spain Colored Orange has performed with Modest Mouse, Ben Kweller, The Octopus Project, The Fiery Furnaces, Of Montreal, Ra Ra Riot and Trail of Dead. They also served as backing band and headlining opener for Daniel Johnston on a number of various occasions, including his 50th birthday celebration in 2011.

Spain Colored Orange has licensed music for commercial use by companies including Ford, Olay, and Avon. The band has toured nationally and consecutively featured in large-scale regional festivals including South by Southwest and Free Press Summer Fest.

== History ==
The band was established in 2000 as a solo project by frontman Gilbert Alfaro, former founding member of Houston-based national-touring bands Blueprint/In Echoes and Refuse To Fall.

Other original members joined after they heard Alfaro's initial taped recordings. The band was originally called "8 Track Charade," but changed their name just days before signing a record deal with Lucid Records. According to Alfaro, the band's final name, Spain Colored Orange, originated from an elementary school project that his grandmother had hanging in her house.

After signing with Lucid Records in 2005, the band released their debut EP Hopelessly Incapable of Standing in the Way.

They ultimately negotiated a break from their contract with Lucid Records in 2008, while in the process of recording a freshman full-length at Houston's historic Sugar Hill Studios. The group signed with Shout It Out Loud Music and released that first full-length record, Sneaky Like a Villain, in 2009.

After a long hiatus the band reformed in late 2023, began performing live again, and started writing new material. In 2026, after teasing a new EP by releasing a couple of singles, "Confiding in Ghosts" was released that summer by Diverse Chorus Records.

== Band members ==
Current members

- Gilbert Alfaro (vocals, electric piano, synths)
- Will Evans (guitar, vocals)
- Jared Arceneaux (bass guitar)
- Jake Allen (percussion)
- Coy Matula (guitar, synths, vocals)

Former members

- Keith Palumbo (percussion)
- James Diederich (percussion)
- Justin Peak (synth, sample)
- Mikey Deleon
- Randy Platt (guitars)
- Ryan Chavez
- Steven Burnett (bass, mouth harp)
- Steve Torres (percussion)
- Mike Dugat (guitar)
- Ben Jarrad (guitar, banjo, vox, & ukulele)
- Steve Aikey (bass)
- Eric Jackson (trumpet)
- Erica Cruz (guitar, synths, electric piano, vocals)
- Bill Matney (studio percussionist)

== Awards ==
Houston Press Music Awards:

- Album of the Year (Hopelessly Incapable of Standing in the Way, 2006)
- Best Indie Rock (2006, 2008, 2009)
- Best Keyboardist (Gilbert Alfaro, 2006, 2008)
- Local Musician of the Year (2006)

== Discography ==
- Hopelessly Incapable of Standing in the Way (EP, 2005)
- Sneaky Like a Villain (Album, 2009)
- Confiding in Ghosts (EP, 2026)
