= War on Women (band) =

American punk rock band

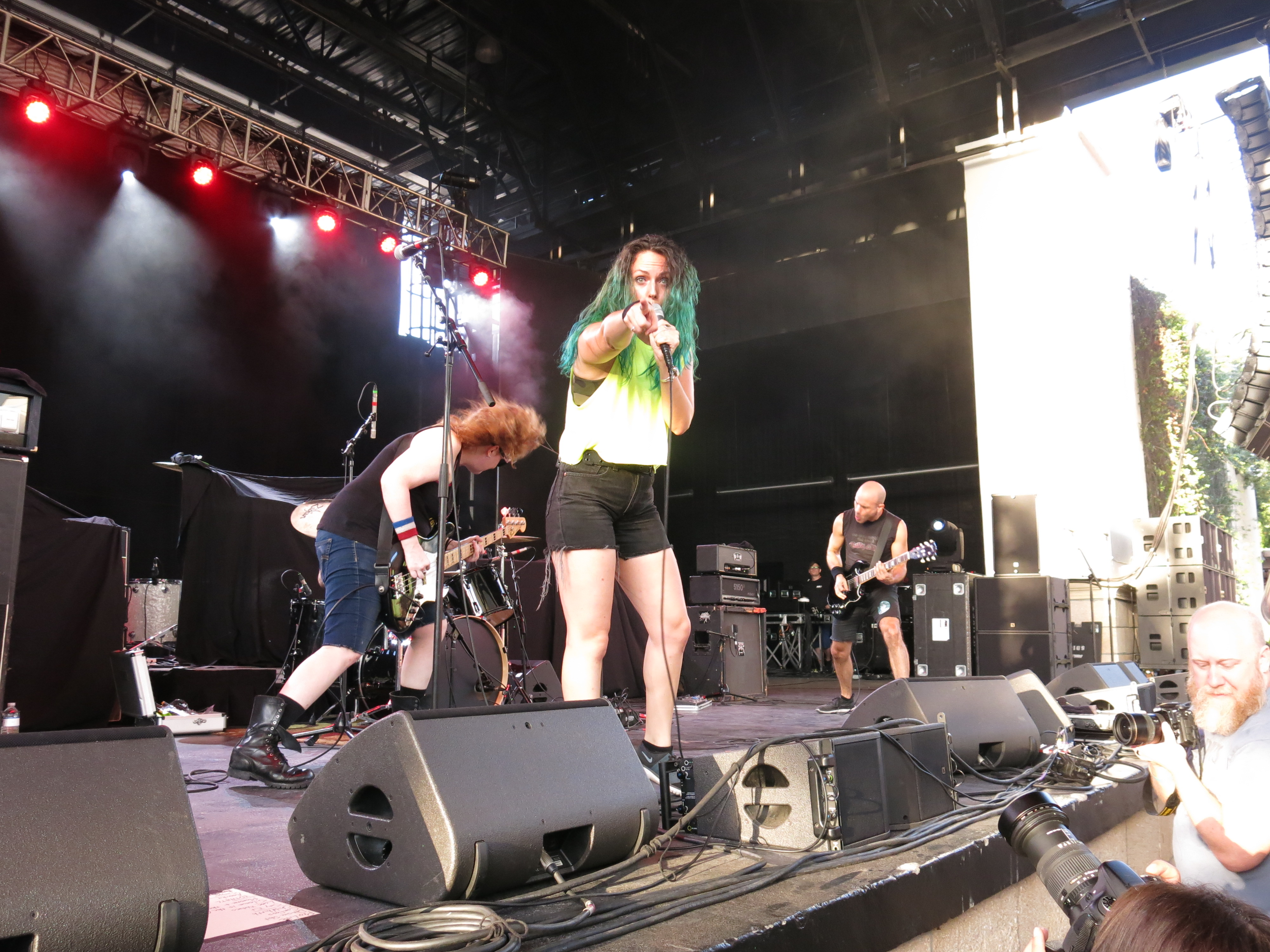

Background information
- Origin: Baltimore, Maryland, U.S.
- Genre: Hardcore punk
- Years active: 2010–present
- Labels: Smartpunk, Bridge Nine, Exotic Fever
- Members: Shawna Potter; Brooks Harlan; Jennifer Vito; Suzanne Werner; Dave Cavalier
- Past members: Nancy Hornburg; Evan Tanner; Rusty Haynie; Ben Jones
- Website: www.waronwomen.bandcamp.com

War on Women is an American hardcore punk band from Baltimore, Maryland, formed in 2010. The political, feminist themes in their music include abortion rights, rape, and misogyny.

== History ==
In 2003, Brooks Harlan recruited Shawna Potter to sing and play guitar for AVEC, an indie-rock band that was based in Baltimore. Seeing Courtney Love playing guitar in "Doll Parts" inspired Potter to play music.

In 2010, Potter and Harlan formed War On Women, a band “inspired by the riot grrrl bands [Potter] adored as a teenager.”

War on Women released their debut album, a six-song EP titled Improvised Weapons, in 2012 on Exotic Fever Records.

In 2015, the band released their first full-length album, the self-titled War on Women, on Bridge Nine Records. The album was recorded, mixed and produced in collaboration with J. Robbins of the band Jawbox.

Their second and third full-length albums were also released under by Bridge Nine Records. The second album, Capture the Flag, was again recorded with J. Robbins and released in 2018. The third album, Wonderful Hell, was released in 2020. Guitarist, Harlan, has acknowledged influences of "Fugazi, Bad Brains, At the Drive-In, Metallica, and Slayer...", as well as less obvious influences such as Suzanne Vega, Nomeansno, Ben Folds Five, and Pat Metheny.

In January 2022, ex-guitarist Nancy Hornburg accused member Brooks Harlan of "controlling and emotionally abusive behavior" during her time with the band, and alleged frontwoman Shawna Potter had been dishonest about the band's financial matters, including royalties. The band issued a response sharing their perspective of these events, disavowing the accusations and indicating Hornburg as having "repeated instances of lateness, inability to play, and overall inconsistent behavior."

In 2022, Scott Tiemann, who was hired as a session musician to record drums on the 2018 album Capture the Flag, was found dead in his garage after an apparent suicide. Tiemann was part of a police investigation involving the filming of his music students in the bathroom of his home, but died before being questioned by police. The band members deny any knowledge of Tiemann's actions.

In the summer of 2022, the band returned to the UK and Europe for a month-long tour.

== Discography ==
- Improvised Weapons (2012, Exotic Fever Records)
- War on Women (2015, Bridge Nine Records)
- Capture the Flag (2018, Bridge Nine Records)
- Wonderful Hell (2020, Bridge Nine Records)
- Time Under Tension (2026, Smartpunk Records)
