= Cope Park =

Studio album by Audio Learning Center
- Released: April 6, 2004
- Recorded: 2003
- Genre: Alternative rock, post punk
- Length: 42:05
- Label: Vagrant
- Producer: Joe Chiccarelli

Audio Learning Center chronology
Friendships Often Fade Away (2002)	Cope Park (2004)

Cope Park is the second and final studio album by American post punk band Audio Learning Center. Musically, Cope Park, like Friendships Often Fade Away, peers over the shoulders of giants. Like any band in this new millennium, Audio Learning Center simultaneously showcases their varied influences while building on them, creating something new. It is the band's last release before Audio Learning Center disbanded.

Professional ratings
Review scores
Source	Rating
Allmusic	4/5 stars
Punknews.org	4/5 stars

== Track listing ==
All lyrics are written by Christopher E. Brady; all music is composed by Christopher E. Brady, Steven Birch, Paul Johnson.

No.	Title	Length
1.	"Waking Up With Eyes Still Closed"	1:27
2.	"The Neverwills"	3:55
3.	"Cope Park"	4:12
4.	"In The Red"	3:03
5.	"California"	5:55
6.	"The Sun"	0:56
7.	"Stereo"	4:45
8.	"Car"	2:53
9.	"You Get That From Your Mother"	5:03
10.	"Passenger"	3:24
11.	"Happy Endings"	6:32
Total length:		42:05

== Personnel ==
Audio Learning Center

- Christopher E. Brady – Lead vocals, bass
- Steven Birch – Guitar, backing vocals
- Paul Johnson – Drums, percussion

Additional musicians

- James Beaton – Fender rhodes, Hammond organ, piano
- Charlie Campbell – Slide Guitar

Artwork

- Sean Tejaratchi – Album Design

Production

- Joe Chiccarelli – Producer, audio production, mixing
- Tom Baker – Mastering
- Neil Chapman – Assistant Engineer
- Jonathon Fagan – Assistant Engineer
- Sean Flora – Assistant Engineer
