= Jet by Day =

- Origin: Athens, Georgia, United States
- Genres: Indie rock, post-rock
- Years active: 1997–present
- Labels: Moodswing Records; Kindercore Records; Future Farmer

Jet by Day is a post-rock band from Athens, Georgia.

== History ==
Jet by Day was originally formed as the Hosstages in 1997 by guitarist David Matysiak, bassist Bo Wamsley and drummer Tom Naumann, while the three were students at Dunwoody High School in suburban Atlanta. In 1998 they changed their name to Jet By Day, and Matysiak and Naumann began attending the University of Georgia. The band self-released EPs in 1998 and 1999, between which Wamsley was replaced by Amy Burmeister, and began building a fan base among the indie rock scene of the American South. In 2001, they recorded their debut full-length, produced by Bob Weston of Shellac. Later releases came on Kindercore Records and Future Farmer. In 2003, bassist Burmeister left the group, later forming Black Kites. The group toured with Hey Mercedes and Damone later that year.

== Members ==
- David Matysiak - guitar, vocals
- Tom Naumann - drums
- Bo Wamsley - bass (1997–1999)
- Amy Burmeister - bass (1999–2003)
- Mason Brown - guitar (2000-)
- Brett Griffin - bass (2003-)

== Discography ==
- Autumn Means It's All Downhill EP (1998)
- Jet by Day EP (1999)
- The Day the Earth Stood Still/Shadows Taller Than Our Soul (split w/The Blindfold Parade) (Two Sheds, 2001)
- The Feedback that Distracts Us (Moodswing Records, 2001)
- Cascadia (Kindercore Records, 2003)
- The Vulture (Future Farmer, 2005)
