= Snuffy Smile =

Snuffy Smile was a long running Japanese record label based in Tokyo and operated by Yoichi Eimori between 1992 and 2005. The label concentrated mainly on the 7-inch vinyl format gaining a large following worldwide. The label released records from a constantly growing roster of some of Japan's finest melodic punk bands as well as other punk bands from around the globe.

The Snuffy Smile label officially ceased to operate in 2005 but then Yoichi moved from Tokyo to Kyoto, the label gained a new lease of life, added an 's' to the name to become Snuffy Smiles with new releases continuing for the foreseeable future.

== Partial list of notable artists and albums ==
- CD Albums
  - Wall - A Silent Voice Wanders The Sea Of Contradiction
  - Lovemen - Children Eat A Nightmare
  - Blew - You're Not The Only One
  - The Urchin - Another Day, Another Sorry State
- Split 7"
  - Screaming Fat Rat / Hot Water Music - F State Revisited
  - My Winter Jane / Discount - s/t
  - Braid / Three Minute Movie - A Split 7 Inch
  - The Miles Apart / This World Is Mine - A Split 7 Inch

== See also ==
- List of record labels
