= Chris Broach =

American singer

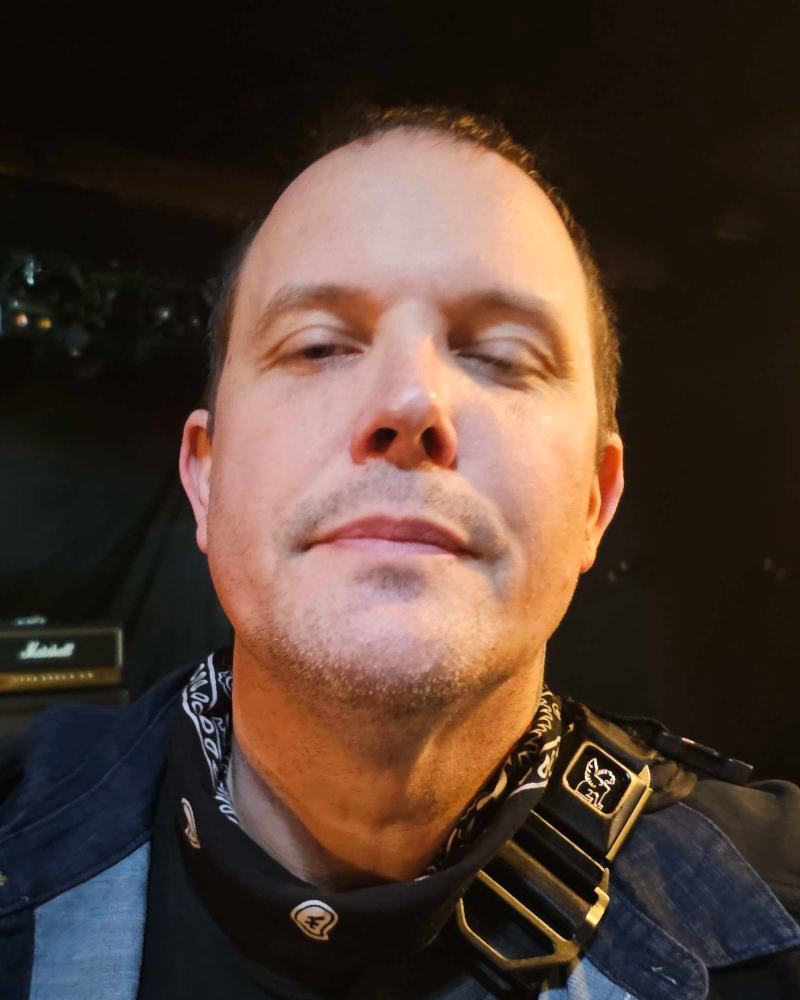
- Broach in 2024

Background information
- Born: Christopher Robert Broach; September 5, 1976 (age 49); Madison, Wisconsin, US
- Origin: Wheeling, Illinois, US
- Genres: Emo, experimental rock, electronic rock, indie rock
- Occupations: Musician producer founder of Lucid Records
- Instruments: Vocals, guitar, bass, keyboards, drum machine
- Years active: 1994–present
- Labels: Cargo/Headhunter; City at Night; Lucid Records; Polyvinyl Records; Topshelf Records; Rhyme & Reason Records
- Website: www.chrisbroach.com

Christopher Robert Broach (born September 5, 1976) is an American musician who is a guitarist and vocalist in the 1990s emo band Braid. Broach joined Braid in 1994, recording guitar for the band's first 7-inch release a week later.

== Career ==
While a member of Braid, Broach also played in The Firebird Suite, and continued playing in what became The Firebird Band after Braid split up. He played guitar for Life at Sea on the album Is there a signal coming through?, and fronted the band L'Spaerow which put out one album on his own label, Lucid Records, which he founded in 2002. Broach, along with Chris Common of These Arms Are Snakes and former Hey Mercedes guitarist Mike Schumaker, were involved in a project entitled The Blakhiv. They released their first EP on Lucid Records in 2006.

In 2015, Broach raised $15,000 in a Kickstarter campaign to record a new Firebird album. The funds covered recording, mixing, producing, and mastering the record, which was produced by Will Yip. Broach and Steve Znavor streamed the new record at Billboard Magazine under the name Sunset, but changed the name to SNST just prior to the digital release on April 28, 2017.

== Discography ==
=== Albums ===
- SacHead – Our World (Playing Field Recordings, 1993) Cassette Only
- Braid – Frankie Welfare Boy Age Five (Divot Records, 1995) – CD/Double LP
- Braid – The Age of Octeen (Mud Records, 1996) – CD/LP
- Braid – Frame & Canvas (Polyvinyl, 1998) – CD/LP
- Braid – Lucky To Be Alive (Glue Factory Records, 2000) – live CD/Double LP
- The Firebird Band – The Setting Sun and Its Satellites – (The Mintaka Conspiracy/Cargo Music/Headhunter, 2000) – CD/LP
- L' Spaerow – L'Spaerow CD – (Lucid Records, 2003) – CD
- Life at Sea – Is There A Signal Coming Through? – (Lucid Records, 2003) – CD
- The Firebird Band – The City at Night – (Bifocal Media/Lucid Records, 2004) CD
- Braid – No Coast, (Topshelf Records, 2014) – CD/LP
- SNST - "Turn Out the Lights", (City at Night Records / Rhyme & Reason Records, 2017) - LP
- SNST - "It's Hard To Be Loved By You", (City at Night Records, 2020) - LP

=== Singles and EPs ===
- Braid – "Rainsnowmatch" 7" (Enclave /Polyvinyl, 1994) – single
- Braid – "I'm Afraid of Everything"/"Radish White Icicle"/"Now I'm Exhausted" 7" (Grand Theft Autumn, 1995) – single
- Braid – "Niagara"/"That Car Came Out of Nowhere" 7" ("Grand Theft Autumn", 1995) – single
- Braid / "Corm Split" 7" (Polyvinyl, 1997) – single
- Braid – "First Day Back"/"Hugs From Boys" 7" (Polyvinyl, 1998) – single
- "Always Something There To Remind Me" (Split 7" w/ Burning Airlines) – (DeSoto Records, 1998) single
- The Firebird Suite – "New York" 7" – (The Mintaka Conspiracy, 1998) – single
- The Firebird Project – "Feel Alright CD" – (The Mintaka Conspiracy, 1999) – EP
- Braid – "Please Driver Faster", (Polyvinyl, 1999) – single
- The Firebird Band – "The Drive" – (Cargo/Headhunter, 2001) – EP
- The Blakhiv – "Any Way She Wants It" – (Lucid Records, 2006) – EP
- Chris Broach – "How Well You Know Me" – (City at Night Records, 2009) – digital single
- Chris Broach – "Beautiful Spaces" – (City at Night Records, 2009) – digital single
- The Firebird Band – "Say Hello" – (Mind Over Matter Records / City at Night Records, 2010) – 7" / digital EP
- Chris Broach – "Madison" – (City at Night Records, 2010) – digital EP
- Braid – "Closer To Closed" – (Polyvinyl, 2011) – EP
- The Firebird Band – "Green" – (City at Night Records, 2011) – digital EP
- The Firebird Band – "Balinese Skies" – (City at Night Records, 2011) – digital EP
- Chris Broach – "Juarez The Hero / Just Like A Duo" – (City at Night Records, 2011) – digital EP
- The Firebird Band – "Night Remixes" – (City at Night Records, 2011) – digital EP
- Chris Broach – "Toy" – (City at Night Records, 2011) – digital single
- Braid – "Braid + Balance + Composure" (Split 7" w/ Balance + Composure) – (No Sleep Records / Polyvinyl, 2013) – single
- SNST – "National Monument" – (City at Night Records, 2016) – digital single
- SNST – "Sunset" or "Remember How It Ends" – (Broken World Media / City at Night Records, 2017) – CD / digital EP
- Mass Energy – "Can We Dance?" – (City at Night Records, 2017) – digital single
- Chris Broach – "Break It Up" – (City at Night Records, 2018) – digital single
- Chris Broach – "Pick Up A Gun" – (City at Night Records, 2018) – digital single
- SNST – "Heart Will Fail You" – (City at Night Records, 2019) – digital single
- SNST – "It's Hard To Be Loved (By You)" – (City at Night Records, 2019) – digital single
- SNST – "What's Evil About?" – (City at Night Records, 2019) – digital single
- SNST – "Worth It" – (City at Night Records, 2019) – digital single
- SNST – "White Collar Villain" – (City at Night Records, 2019) – digital single
- SNST – "Chaos Is Meant To Be" – (City at Night Records, 2020) – digital single
- SNST – "Be Afraid" – (City at Night Records, 2020) – digital single
- SNST – "Catastrophe" – (City at Night Records, 2020) – digital single
- SNST – "Solid Ground" – (City at Night Records, 2020) – digital single
- SNST – "I 4 I" – (City at Night Records, 2020) – digital single
- SNST – "Funky Fresh" – (City at Night Records, 2020) – digital single

=== Compilations ===
- Braid – Movie Music Vol. 1, (Polyvinyl, 2000) – compilation CD/Double LP
- Braid – Movie Music Vol. 2, (Polyvinyl, 2000) – compilation CD/Double LP
- The Firebird Suite - Archives – (Lucid Records, 2003) - CD
- Chris Broach – "Lost Years: Volume 11" – (City at Night Records, 2018) – digital LP

=== Appearances ===
- Campanula Blue – "I Love Kerrazo" – guest vocals (Core For Care, 1996)
- Braid – "Trompe Le Monde" from Where Is My Mind? A Tribute to the Pixies (Glue Factory Records, 1999)
- The Firebird Band – "She Wears He-Harem" from A Tribute To Shudder To Think (2003)

=== VHS/DVD ===
- Actuality of Thought (BiFocal Media, 2001) – VHS
- Braid – Killing A Camera (Bifocal Media, 2001 VHS, 2004 DVD) – DVD

== Sources ==
- Grubbs, E. (2008). Post: A look at the Influence of Post-Hardcore, 1985–2007. iUniverse. New York.
