= Lucid Records =

Independent record label in Deerfield, Illinois, United States

- Founded: 2002
- Founder: Chris Broach
- Distributor: The Orchard
- Genre: Indie; Rock; Electro; Garage
- Country of origin: United States
- Location: Chicago, Illinois
- Official website: Lucid Records

Lucid Records is an independent record label in Illinois, run by Chris Broach of Braid, The Firebird Band, & L' Spaerow.

== Overview ==
Lucid Records is a record label owned by Chris Broach.

The label's first release was in 2002 with The Blackouts' debut album Everyday is a Sunday Evening

Lucid Records is exclusively distributed via The Orchard.

== Lucid artists ==
=== Active ===
- Of The Opera
- Lokbrá
- Life at Sea
- Kerbloki
- The Firebird Band
- Chris Broach
- The Blakhiv
- The Blackouts (now known as The Living Blue)

=== Former ===
- The International Theatre of War
- L'Spaerow
- Monday's Hero
- The Silent Treatment
- Spain Colored Orange
- Thunderlip
- The Tiniest Unicorn

== See also ==
- List of record labels
- Chicago record labels
