= No Coast =

Studio album by Braid
- Released: July 8, 2014
- Genres: Emo, indie rock, math rock, power pop
- Length: 39:49
- Label: Topshelf
- Producer: Will Yip

Braid chronology
| Movie Music, Vol. 2 (2000) | No Coast (2014) |

Professional ratings
Aggregate scores
| Source | Rating |
|---|---|
| Metacritic | 75/100 |
Review scores
| Source | Rating |
| AllMusic | 3.5/5 stars |
| The A.V. Club | A− |
| Paste | 8.8/10 |
| Punknews.org | 4/5 stars |
| Pitchfork | 7.7/10 |

No Coast is the fourth studio album by American emo band Braid, released on July 8, 2014, on Topshelf Records.

== Background ==
In 1998 Braid released their critically acclaimed third album, Frame and Canvas, however the following year Braid disbanded. The band remained inactive (except for a brief temporary reunion in 2004) until Braid announced their permanent reunion in 2011, and they would write new material. The same year an EP titled Closer to Closed was released, but was received to poor reviews. However, in late 2013, Braid announced that they had signed to Topshelf Records and planned on releasing a new full-length album in 2014, their first in 16 years.

No Coast was confirmed to be completed in March 2014, and was released the following July to positive reviews from critics.

== Track list ==
| No. | Title | Length |
|---|---|---|
| 1. | "Bang" | 3:19 |
| 2. | "East End Hollows" | 3:53 |
| 3. | "No Coast" | 3:29 |
| 4. | "Damages!" | 3:06 |
| 5. | "Many Enemies" | 2:35 |
| 6. | "Pre-Evergreen" | 3:42 |
| 7. | "Put Some Wings on That Kid" | 2:24 |
| 8. | "Lux" | 2:52 |
| 9. | "Doing Yourself In" | 3:50 |
| 10. | "Climber New Entry" | 3:38 |
| 11. | "Light Crisis" | 2:29 |
| 12. | "This Is Not a Revolution" | 4:32 |
| Total length: | | 39:49 |
