= Lifted Bells =

American rock band

Lifted Bells are an American rock band from Chicago, Illinois. The band consists of members of the bands Their/They're/There, Braid, and Stay Ahead of the Weather.

== Career ==
Lifted Bells began in 2013 with the release of a self-titled EP, via Naked Ally Records. In 2014, Lifted Bells released their second EP titled Lights Out via Naked Ally. In 2016, Lifted Bells signed to Run For Cover Records and released their third EP titled Overreactor.

== Discography ==
EPs

- Lifted Bells (2013, Naked Ally)
- Lights Out (2014, Naked Ally)
- Overreactor (2016, Run For Cover)
- Minor Tantrums (2018, Run For Cover)
