= The Nerve (magazine) =

- Editor-In-Chief: Bradley C. Damsgaard
- Categories: Music
- Frequency: Six issues yearly
- Founded: 1998
- Final issue: December 2007
- Company: Nerve Magazine
- Country: Canada
- Based in: Vancouver
- Language: English
- Website: thenervemagazine.com
- ISSN: 1714-7840
- OCLC: 58535176

The Nerve was a free Canadian monthly music magazine. It was founded in 1998, and was distributed in Vancouver, Victoria, Bellingham, Seattle, Edmonton, Calgary, Winnipeg, Toronto, and Montreal. The last issue was published in December 2007 (featuring Vancouver band Black Mountain on its cover), and has been on hiatus ever since. No official announcement has yet been made regarding this halt.
