= Matt Lunsford =

American record label founder and co-owner (born 1976)

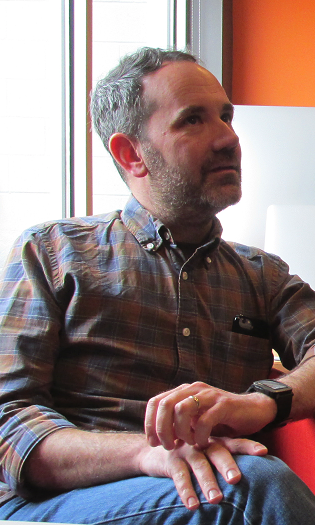
- Lunsford in 2018.
- Born: November 5, 1976 (age 49); Danville, Illinois, U.S.
- Occupation: Co-founder of Polyvinyl Record Co.
- Years active: 1996-present
- Spouse: Darcie Lunsford

Matt Lunsford is the founder and co-owner of Polyvinyl Record Co., an American independent record label headquartered in Champaign-Urbana, Illinois.

== Early years ==
In 1994, while attending high school in Danville, Illinois, Lunsford and his then-girlfriend (now wife) Darcie published a fanzine called Polyvinyl Press. After releasing a pair of 7"s and Direction, a 20-track compilation album documenting the Midwestern D.I.Y. scene, Polyvinyl Press officially transitioned into Polyvinyl Record Co. in 1996. At this point, Lunsford decided to drop out of college (where he had been pursuing an engineering degree) to focus on the label full-time.

As recounted in the book Post: A Look at the Influence of Post-Hardcore 1985-2007, Lunsford's relationship with Polyvinyl's first break-out band, Braid, formed during time spent skateboarding with a couple of the group's members. Lunsford says the DIY ethos of skateboarding "defined my personality."

== Career ==
As of 2015 Polyvinyl had released over 300 albums from over 100 artists under Lunsford's watch.

In 1998 Lunsford became friends with the members of American Football and encouraged the band to record an album. In 1999, Lunsford decided to release their debut full-length even though the band broke up. American Football has gone on to garner considerable acclaim in the time since its release, including a #6 ranking on Rolling Stone's list of the 40 Greatest Emo Albums of All Time.

Lunsford has been credited as a producer on two Braid releases - Movie Music Vol. 1 and Movie Music, Vol. 2 - as well as an art director on the 2008 of Montreal album Skeletal Lamping, which was part of the groundbreaking Skeletal Lamping Collection.

In 2009, Lunsford was interviewed for a New York Times article about Kickstarter because Polyvinyl was considered one of the site's "earliest success stories." According to Kickstarter, Polyvinyl's project was the platform's most-funded project for a 57-day period.

In 2014, Lunsford received an executive producer credit for his work on the of Montreal feature-length documentary The Past Is a Grotesque Animal, which was released via Oscilloscope Laboratories.

In 2018, Polyvinyl entered into a partnership with Brooklyn-based label Double Double Whammy. DDW co-founder/owner Mike Caridi has been enthusiastic about the pairing, telling Pitchfork "I’ve learned a ton from them. I talk to them pretty much every day—they’re kind of like mentors in a way."
