= Frame & Canvas =

Studio album by Braid
- Released: April 7, 1998
- Recorded: December 1997
- Studios: Inner Ear, Arlington County, Virginia
- Genres: Emo; post-hardcore
- Length: 41:51
- Label: Polyvinyl
- Producers: J. Robbins; Braid

Braid chronology
The Age of Octeen (1996)	Frame & Canvas (1998)	Movie Music, Vol. 1 (2001)

Frame & Canvas is the third studio album by American rock band Braid. It was released on April 7, 1998, through Polyvinyl Record Co. After the release of the band's second studio album, The Age of Octeen (1996), drummer Damon Atkinson replaced Roy Ewing due to him being unable to commit to touring. Recording sessions took place at Inner Ear Studios in December 1997, with J. Robbins helping with production during the sessions. The album is an emo and post-hardcore release, for which the lyrics were co-written by vocalist/guitarists Chris Broach and Bob Nanna, or solely by Nanna.

Preceded by a European tour with the Get Up Kids, Frame & Canvas was promoted by Braid with tours across the United States, Canada, Europe and Japan with Compound Red, Discount, and Burning Airlines. It had sold over 16,000 copies by July 2004. The album has appeared on best-of lists for the emo genre by multiple publications, such as Kerrang!, NME, and Rolling Stone. Braid performed the album in its entirety during a 2012 US tour.

== Background and production ==
Following the release of their second studio album The Age of Octeen in 1996, Braid played shows in Illinois, Wisconsin, and Missouri in September and October. Between November 1996 and January 1997, the band toured the south and west coasts of the United States. Following a handful of shows in February 1997, drummer Roy Ewing left Braid the following month. He was replaced by Damon Atkinson of Figurehead; Atkinson had previously filled in for Ewing when he was unable to book time off work for a tour. Atkinson had been a fan of the band and Ewing's drumming; when he came to practice, they felt he was the perfect replacement. Vocalist/guitarist Bob Nanna said Atkinson hit his kit harder than Ewing, who had a lighter, jazzy approach. Braid continued to tour throughout 1997; playing with the Get Up Kids, Tomorrow, and Compound Red, among others.

During this time, the band wrote material for their next album while attending college. Vocalist/guitarist Chris Broach dropped out as they were becoming more active. The members were spread across different towns and states: Atkinson in Milwaukee, Wisconsin; Nanna in Chicago, Illinois; and Broach and bassist Todd Bell in Champaign, Illinois. Nanna and Bell ran their own label Grand Theft Autumn Records, who had released a split single with independent label Polyvinyl Record Co. The members used to skateboard with Polyvinyl's co-founder Matt Lunsford before they became a band; he and fellow co-founder Darcie Knight organized the band's first-ever show in 1993. Braid were not contractually signed to Mud Records, who released The Age of Octeen, as the label typically worked with local bands from a college town. The band wanted to work with another company, and sent out items to the likes of Touch and Go Records and Merge Records; they attempted to contact Jade Tree, who would not respond to them.

"A Dozen Roses" was the first song the band wrote with Atkinson on drums. According to Nanna, Atkinson brought a sense of groove to the track that made it markedly different from their previous material and, for that reason, the song was almost scrapped. The tracks "First Day Back" and "Hugs from Boys" were recorded in August 1997. Following on from this, Braid traveled across the US with Rainer Maria in October of that year. To coincide with the tour, they released the two songs on a 7" vinyl, through Polyvinyl Record Co. The day Nanna graduated from college, Braid traveled to Washington, D.C., to record their next album. Frame & Canvas was recorded in December 1997 at Inner Ear Studios in Arlington County, Virginia, with J. Robbins and the band acting as producers. Braid had met Robbins twice before working on the album with him. They approached him because of his work on albums by the Promise Ring and Kerosene 454. Robbins served as the engineer for Frame & Canvas and also mixed the recordings. The recording and mixing process lasted six days, and each recording day lasted 13 hours.

== Composition and lyrics ==
Musically, the sound of Frame & Canvas has been described as emo and post-hardcore, landing between the late 1990s Midwest emo and D.C. post-hardcore acts, such as Fugazi and Jawbox, the latter of which Robbins was a member of. All of the music was written by Braid; Nanna wrote lyrics for seven of the tracks, and co-wrote the other five with Broach. Broach came up with the title of Frame & Canvas, which is taken from "Killing a Camera". Nanna said the title referred to "some kind of art school thing". Broach has a bigger vocal role on the album than the band's previous releases; he explained this was because he was "sick of being pushed down in the mix". The opening track, "The New Nathan Detroits", begins with a math rock drum introduction by Atkinson. The song features Broach and Nanna discussing job prospects with their parents. "Never Will Come for Us" includes references to Braid being an underground act that did not get airplay, and playing shows at friends' house parties. "First Day Back" was written after arriving home from their late 1996/early 1997 tour, and is about settling in after being gone for a while. "Collect from Clark Kent" is an atypical Midwest emo track, which talks about breakdowns in communication and long-distance issues, with Nanna singing to a woman similar to the Superman character Lois Lane.

"Milwaukee Sky Rocket" was initially titled "Sky Rocket", until Atkinson—who was from Milwaukee—joined the band. They were working on the dance-indebted "A Dozen Roses" in Nanna's parents' basement when Atkinson began playing what he called "this cool beat". Nanna stated that "immediately once he started playing", he thought: "This is different." Robbins added tambourine to the track. Discussing "Urbana's Too Dark", Borach said Urbana, Illinois, was where the members lived alongside "the art kids and music kids. The frats were in Champaign and the old guard", such as Hum and Poster Children. The track's title referred to a movement that called for more street lights in Urbana because of concern over sexual assaults. With "Consolation Prize Fighter", the members felt there was competition from other bands, especially from their friends' bands, to make great albums and songs. It was written along with "Urbana's Too Dark" in 1995. "Ariel" is about living under one roof with people in bands while wishing the music Braid were making in the basement was being made upstairs. Robbins played an extra drum kit on "Breathe In", which Broach was highly impressed by. According to Broach, the song is about "trying to be the best person". Nanna said to occupy himself on tour, he would write lyrics; the lyrics of "I Keep a Diary" were used verbatim from a journal entry.

== Release and promotion ==
Between January and March 1998, Braid went on a tour of Europe with the Get Up Kids, with the latter initially planning to take Hot Water Music on the trek. The members of Braid and the Get Up Kids shared a van; the Get Up Kids' label Doghouse Records covered the expenses for the vehicle and both bands' equipment, while both acts paid for their own flight tickets. Frame & Canvas was released on April 7 of that year, through Polyvinyl. It was promoted by performing across the US with Compound Red until early May 1998. Braid immediately went back on tour with the Get Up Kids throughout that month, while they accompanied various acts in June 1998. In August of that year, the band played one show in their home state, before embarking on a Canadian tour with Discount. Following on from this, they embarked on an East Coast tour in October and early November 1998. Throughout the rest of November and the following month, Braid toured across Europe with Robbins' band Burning Airlines.

After a number of northeastern US shows, the band embarked on a west coast tour with Seaweed and 365 Days of Pure Movie Magic in March 1999. They went on a cross-country tour throughout the following month with Kind of Like Spitting, before embarking on a Japanese tour with Eversor in May 1999. In June of that year, Braid announced they would be breaking up due to "internal stress". It was later revealed that Broach wanted to return to school and had little interest in the band by this point. Aside from performing at a friend's wedding, the band played their last few shows in August 1999, including a hometown performance, which was later released as their live album Lucky to Be Alive (2000). Ewing performed on a few songs at the band's last show. Footage from Braid's last five days as a band was included in their documentary film Killing a Camera (2001). Polyvinyl reissued the album in 2003; they explained that they had signed a pressing and distribution deal with Southern in 1998, which had expired in 2003.

== Reception and legacy ==
Professional ratings
Review scores
Source	Rating
AllMusic	4/5 stars
LAS Magazine	7.8/10
NME	8/10
Pitchfork	8.6/10

AllMusic reviewer Blake Butler noted that Braid came up with "very technical pop melodies" on Frame & Canvas, accompanied by frequent time signature changes. He liked the "beautiful interlocking" guitar lines, which he wrote were "fused together with yelled/sung boyish vocals" from Broach and Nanna. In the opinion of Blake, the album cemented itself as one of Braid's best works. Blake even went as far as to say that by the end of the first track "you know you will be humming these melodies in your head for at least the next few days". LAS Magazine founder Eric J. Herboth said the album was "the record that is going to blow things wide open for Braid". He added that the band found an "equally amazing drummer" in Atkinson, alongside a "candy coated plush sound" and a "new best friend" with Robbins.

Western Homes of Nude as the News described the album as "sort of like an emo London Calling [by the Clash], stretching out and connecting with rock history as a whole". The staff at Impact Press called Frame & Canvas "incredible", adding that the song arrangements are "untraditional and right on, their vocals are well-sung". Punk Planet's Mike Barron said it was full of "genuine, heartfelt, and complex songs", highlighting "The New Nathan Detroits", "Milwaukee Sky Rocket", and "Urbana's Took Dark" as examples of Braid performing melodic music "really goddamn well". Andrew Chadwick of Ink 19 considered the songs "more straightforward than on Age of Octeen," while the band's "penchant for constantly changing structures remains intact, and their knack for amazing melodies and memorable songwriting seems to have grown". Glenn McDonald, in his online music review column The War Against Silence, compared the band to their idols Fugazi, asserting, "Braid are what I wanted Fugazi to become. (...) Fugazi showed how the world could be reduced to a set of sharp angles, every compound shape abstracted to the smallest possible number of lines, but after a while I got tired of dramas staged with just lines. [With Frame and Canvas] Braid points out that if you relax the rules a little, and allow the lines to be bent, you can draw surprisingly recognizable characters without needing very many more of them."

As of July 2004, Frame & Canvas has sold over 16,000 copies worldwide. It has appeared on various best-of emo album lists, being named to lists by Consequence of Sound, Kerrang!, LA Weekly, NME, and Rolling Stone. Similarly, "A Dozen Roses" appeared on a best-of emo songs list by Vulture. OC Weekly said the album established Polyvinyl and pushed the band as an important figure in the emo scene. Frame & Canvas was an important snapshot of second-wave emo and the contemporary Champaign, Illinois indie rock scene. Kyle Ryan of The A.V. Club considered it, alongside Nothing Feels Good (1997) by the Promise Ring and Do You Know Who You Are? (1996) by Texas Is the Reason, as one of the defining releases of the second wave. Nanna ranked it as his second favorite Braid album, saying: "You can hear the fact that we really needed to nail it and you can tell we’re nervous but excited and really pressed for time. But I’m still happy with the way it sounds." In 2012, the band embarked on a two-week US tour, during which they performed Frame & Canvas in its entirety.

== Track listing ==
All music by Braid. All songs produced by J. Robbins and Braid.

Frame & Canvas track listing
No.	Title	Lyricist	Length
1.	"The New Nathan Detroits"	Bob Nanna; Chris Broach	4:18
2.	"Killing a Camera"	Nanna; Broach	2:34
3.	"Never Will Come for Us"	Nanna; Broach	3:31
4.	"First Day Back"	Nanna	3:22
5.	"Collect from Clark Kent"	Nanna	3:26
6.	"Milwaukee Sky Rocket"	Broach; Nanna	3:13
7.	"A Dozen Roses"	Nanna	4:15
8.	"Urbana's Too Dark"	Nanna	3:26
9.	"Consolation Prizefighter"	Nanna	3:13
10.	"Ariel"	Nanna	2:38
11.	"Breathe In"	Broach; Nanna	2:16
12.	"I Keep a Diary"	Nanna	5:47

== Personnel ==
Personnel per booklet.

Braid

- Damon Atkinson – drums
- Todd Bell – bass
- Chris Broach – vocals, guitar
- Bob Nanna – vocals, guitar

Additional musicians

- J. Robbins – extra percussion (tracks 5 and 11)

Production

- J. Robbins – engineer, mixing, producer
- Braid – producer
- Andy Mueller – design, photography
