= The Age of Octeen =

Studio album by Braid
- Released: September 7, 1996
- Recorded: 1996
- Genre: Emo; post-hardcore
- Length: 38:07
- Label: Mud

Braid chronology
Frankie Welfare Boy Age 5 (1995)	The Age of Octeen (1996)	Frame & Canvas (1998)

Professional ratings
Review scores
Source	Rating
Allmusic	4/5 stars

The Age of Octeen is the second studio album by American emo band Braid, released September 7, 1996 on Mud Records.

Released a year after their debut album, Frankie Welfare Boy Age Five, the album is notably 25 minutes shorter and features half as many songs. However, The Age of Octeen made up for this by showcasing greatly improved production quality, and songs are on average three-to-four minutes long, almost twice as long as those featured on Frankie Welfare Boy Age 5.

Songs from the album were included in the Braid compilation album Movie Music, Vol. 2.

== Recording ==
Braid's debut double album Frankie Welfare Boy Age Five, was recorded at a friend's studio, which allowed them the freedom to record whenever they wanted, writing entire songs on the spot. Frontman Bob Nanna has stated that this excessive freedom and the sheer quantity of songs made the album "unlistenable."

After recording Frankie Welfare Boy, Braid went on tour, which resulted in the band becoming a more cohesive unit. According to Nanna, their time on the road also allowed them to refine their sound and gave them "a better idea of what we wanted" when making their followup Age of Octeen. Nanna has also said that by placing "My Baby Smokes" and "Chandelier Swing" as the first and penultimate tracks respectively, the band was making a conscious decision to guide the album's "flow", compared to the slapdash approach of Frankie Welfare Boy.

== Critical reception ==
Some have described The Age of Octeen as overshadowed when compared to other albums in the Braid discography. In retrospect, critics have described the album as under-appreciated. Online publication Mr Hipster praised the album in a retrospective review, stating, "This is true emo in its purest forms. (sic) It's as if the band just picked up its instruments and let the spirit carry them. If you’re looking for normal song structure, go listen to some Good Charlotte and leave us alone, but if you want to be a little challenged by complex start and stop beauty, you could certainly do worse." Ryan Reed writing for Pop Matters has called the album "an overlooked mini-masterpiece."

== Track listing ==
1. "My Baby Smokes" – 3:15
2. "Nineteen Seventy Five" – 3:04
3. "Divers" – 3:42
4. "Jimmy Go Swimmer" – 2:26
5. "Movie Clock Star" – 5:45
6. "Eulalia, Eulalia" – 3:56
7. "Grace Car Part One" – 4:10
8. "Harrison Ford" – 4:00
9. "American Typewriter" – 3:19
10. "The Chandelier Swing" – 3:24
11. "Autobiography" – 1:06
