= Audio Learning Center =

- Origin: Portland, Oregon
- Genres: Rock
- Years active: 1998–2004
- Label: Vagrant Records
- Past members: Steven Birch; Christopher Brady; Paul Johnson

Audio Learning Center was an American rock band from Portland, Oregon.

== Biography ==
Audio Learning Center was formed in the fall of 1998 by Christopher Brady and Steven Birch (formerly of bands Pond and Sprinkler respectively), along with Paul Johnson on drums.

The band were signed by Rich Egan, owner of Vagrant Records, releasing their debut, Friendships Often Fade Away in 2002, produced by Adam Kasper. In 2004, they released Cope Park, produced by Joe Chiccarelli. The band broke up soon after the release of their second album.

== Members ==
- Christopher Brady - Bass, Vocals
- Steven Birch - Guitar, Backing Vocals
- Paul Johnson - Drums

== Discography ==
=== Studio albums ===
- Friendships Often Fade Away - February 26, 2002
- Cope Park - April 6, 2004
