= Damon Atkinson =

American drummer

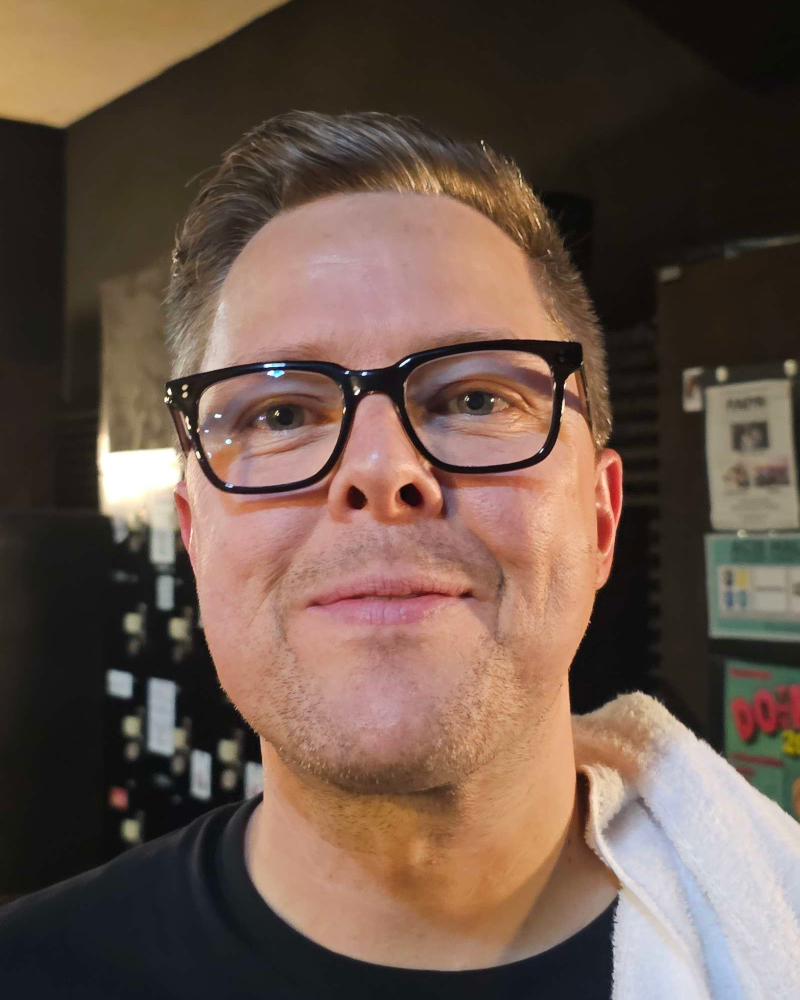

Background information
- Genres: Alternative rock, indie rock, emo
- Instrument: Drums
- Member of: Braid
- Formerly of: Hey Mercedes

Damon Atkinson is an American drummer. He replaced Roy Ewing as the drummer of Braid in 1997 and stayed in the band until it disbanded in 1999. His playing style is often noted for being heavy on complex time signatures, sometimes going into polyrhythmic territory.

After Braid parted ways he went on to be the drummer for Hey Mercedes with Todd Bell and Bob Nanna. After that band broke up, Atkinson and Nanna formed Certain People I Know in 2009, release four songs under that name in June 2009.

Braid reformed in the 2010s, with Atkinson as drummer.
