= J. Robbins =

American rock musician

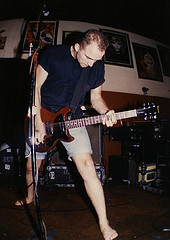
- Robbins in 1991

Background information
- Born: James Robbins; June 14, 1967 (age 59)
- Origin: Washington, D.C., U.S.
- Genres: Hardcore punk, punk rock, post-hardcore
- Occupations: Musician, record producer
- Instruments: Vocals, guitar, bass

James Robbins, better known as J. Robbins, is an American rock musician and record producer. He is best known for being the leader of the post-hardcore band Jawbox and being a prolific producer of other bands in the Baltimore and Washington D.C. area.

== Career ==
Robbins began his career as a bassist for Government Issue, and has also led five of his own bands: Jawbox, Rollkicker Laydown, Burning Airlines, Channels, and Office of Future Plans. He was a touring bassist for Scream and played bass on the debut 7" from Jack Potential, which was issued by DeSoto Records in 1993. More recently he played bass in Report Suspicious Activity with Vic Bondi, which released two albums on Alternative Tentacles Records.

In 2011, Robbins, along with Kerosene 454's drummer and fellow Channels bandmate Darren Zentek, bassist Brooks Harlan, and guitarist/cellist Gordon Withers, released an EP under the name Office of Future Plans. The band, who had been playing since 2009 and released an album on Dischord Records in November 2011, but as of October 2016, they are not together anymore. On May 31, 2019, J. Robbins released his first solo album, Un-Becoming.

In February 2024, Robbins released Basilisk.

=== Producer ===
Robbins is also a successful producer and engineer for bands such as War on Women, Ponytail, Clutch (and side project The Bakerton Group), Jets to Brazil, Braid, Hey Mercedes, Shiner, Mock Orange, Bacchae (band), The Pauses, The Life and Times, Miranda Sound, Time Spent Driving, Faraquet, The Dismemberment Plan, The Monorchid, The Promise Ring, Dwindle, Pilot to Gunner, Paint It Black, None More Black, Jawbreaker, Discount, Against Me!, Goodbye Soundscape, Modern Life is War, Stapleton, Murder By Death, mewithoutYou, Black Cross (hardcore), Lemuria, Caustic Casanova, The Sword, Debate (from São Paulo, Brazil), Coliseum, Hammer No More the Fingers, Small Brown Bike, Broadcaster, Noyo Mathis and Nakatomi Plaza.

== Personal life ==
In 2007, Robbins's son Callum was diagnosed with spinal muscular atrophy, an incurable nerve disorder. A number of benefit shows for Callum Robbins have been organized and played in cities such as Chicago, Washington DC, Minneapolis, and New York.
