= Braid (band) =

American emo band

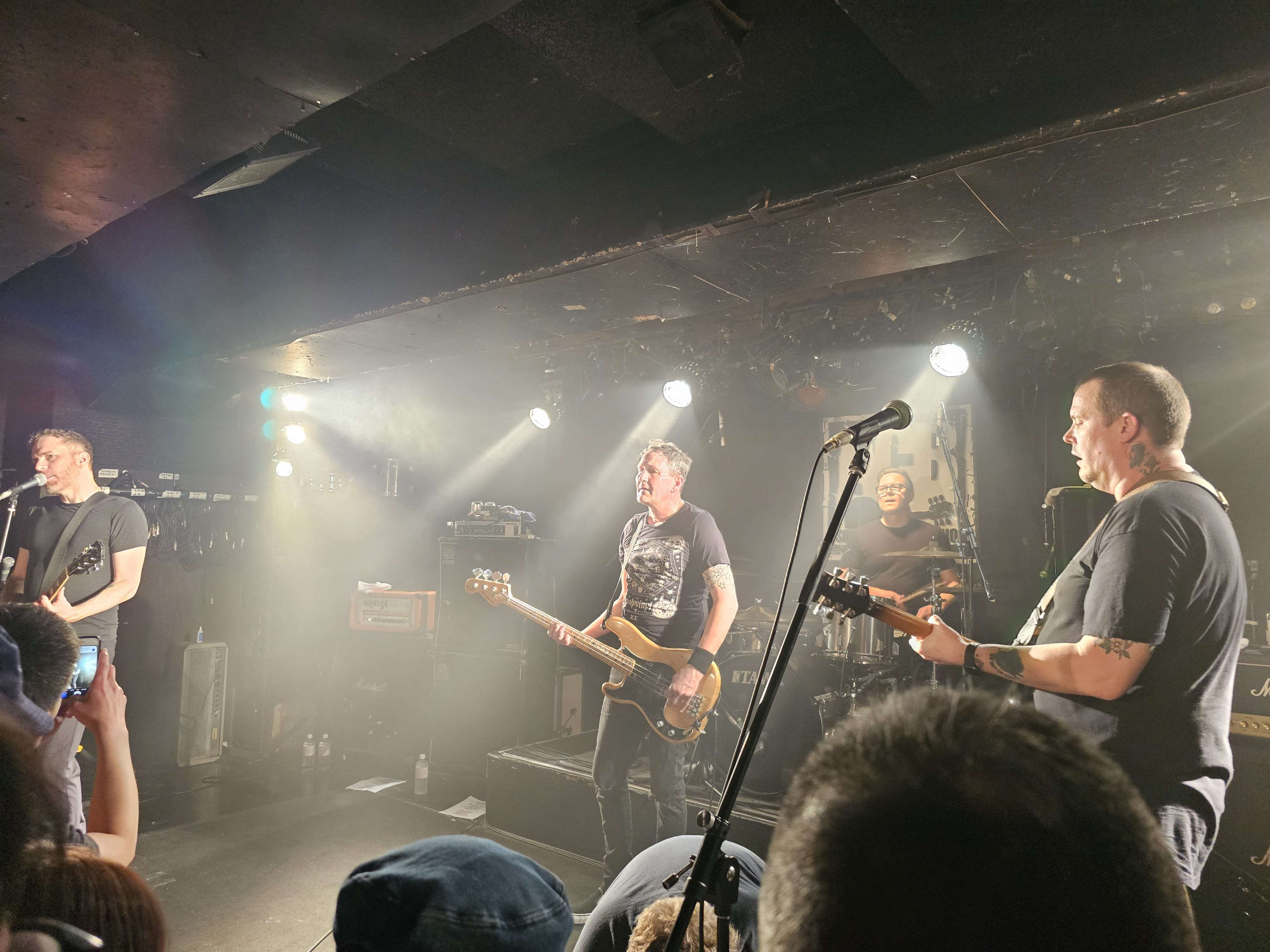
- Braid performing at Shinjuku ACB, 30 March 2024; From left to right: Bob Nanna, Todd Bell, Damon Atkinson, Chris Broach

Background information
- Origin: Champaign, Illinois, U.S.
- Genres: Emo; post-hardcore; post-punk; indie rock; math rock
- Years active: 1993–1999, 2004, 2011–present
- Labels: Enclave, Divot, Mud, New Granada, Grand Theft Autumn, Tree, Polyvinyl, DeSoto, Snuffy Smile, Glue Factory, No Sleep, Topshelf
- Spinoffs: Hey Mercedes
- Members: Bob Nanna; Todd Bell; Chris Broach; Damon Atkinson
- Past members: Jay Ryan; Roy Ewing; Pete Havranek; Kate Reuss
- Website: braid.bandcamp.com

Braid is an American emo band from Champaign, Illinois, formed in 1993.

Following several early line-up changes, the band eventually settled on Bob Nanna on guitar and vocals, Todd Bell on bass, Chris Broach on guitar and vocals, and Roy Ewing on drums until he was replaced in 1997 by new drummer Damon Atkinson.

In 1998 the group released their third album, Frame & Canvas, to critical acclaim and is considered a staple of the late 1990s emo movement. Despite Frame & Canvas's success, Braid disbanded in 1999. Nanna, Bell, and Atkinson formed the more melodic Hey Mercedes, while Broach would dedicate more time to The Firebird Band which was previously a side project.

The band reunited shortly from June to August 2004, before disbanding again. In 2011, Braid reunited permanently, playing their 600th show and releasing a new album, No Coast. Braid have had an outsized impact on music, being cited as an influence by such bands as Biffy Clyro, Basement, and Balance and Composure.

== History ==
=== Formation: 1993 ===
In fall 1993, Bob Nanna was playing drums in a Chicago band called Friction who toured locally and opened for prominent bands like Jawbreaker. As Friction prepared to record their first album, Nanna left for college at the University of Illinois Urbana-Champaign and was soon looking for another band as a side project. Nanna met drummer Roy Ewing when he placed an ad in Maximumrocknroll, looking for someone to trade live concert tapes with. Ewing played with Nanna's high school friend, guitarist Pete Havranek, and Nanna became their singer and guitarist, with Jay Ryan joining them on bass and Kate Reuss on lead vocals. Nanna suggested the name Braid.

Shortly after forming, Ryan left the band for various reasons and was replaced by Todd Bell, who had played with Ewing in a band called Lowercase N. Braid played their first show December 10, 1993, in Danville, Illinois. Two months later, Reuss left the band after they played their second show. Braid decided not to replace her, leaving Nanna as the lead singer. Nanna's main band, Friction, broke up in July 1994 after a short tour, turning Braid from a side project into his main focus.

With Nanna wary about his singing, Braid started looking for a new singer. They met Chris Broach when he attended one of their shows and invited him to sing with the band. Around this time the rest of the band decided to fire Havranek, citing creative differences, so Broach was moved guitar and second vocals.

=== First recordings and national tour: 1994–1997 ===
In September, Braid recorded three songs for their first release. The "Rainsnowmatch" 7-inch came out in December on Enclave Records. While Rainsnowmatch was being released, the band began recording their debut album. Frankie Welfare Boy Age 5 was released in June 1995 on Divot Records. With a huge backlog of written material, Braid continued to write and record songs for various compilation appearances and 7-inch releases.

Starting in July 1995, Braid began their first national tour. They played traditional venues, such as bars and clubs, but also booked shows in the homes of fans and VFW halls. Whenever there was a break in touring, Braid booked recording sessions and began work on their second album. In July 1996, The Age of Octeen was released on Mud Records. Also in 1996, the "I'm Afraid of Everything" 7-inch was released on the band's own label, Grand Theft Autumn in conjunction with Polyvinyl Records. Having no contractual obligations with Mud, Braid reached out to independent labels such as Merge, Touch and Go, and Jade Tree, to no avail.

By 1997, touring schedules had begun to take their toll on Ewing, who in March decided to leave the band. With Ewing's blessing, Damon Atkinson became the band's drummer and joined them on their spring tour. That spring also saw Nanna graduate from college, allowing them to become a full-time band. Braid celebrated their new freedom by going on a headlining tour of Europe, with their friends The Get Up Kids opening. However, after the first night, the two bands decided to switch the playing order because of the popularity of The Get Up Kids in Europe. After the European tour, Braid returned to the North America for another tour of the U.S. and Canada.

=== Frame and Canvas: 1998 ===
In late 1997, Braid recorded their third LP Frame & Canvas at Inner Ear Studios with producer J. Robbins. The album was released by Polyvinyl in April 1998, receiving critical acclaim and brought Braid greater exposure, eventually being regarded as one of the most influential bands of the 1990s emo movement. With the release of Frame & Canvas, they embarked on a tour of the East Coast with Compound Red, followed by a run along the West Coast with the Get Up Kids, a jaunt to Canada with Discount, and a European tour with Burning Airlines.

The band also played a number of dates with All and Less Than Jake. Jawbox bassist Kim Coletta became the band's manager.

=== Final recordings and disbandment: 1998–1999 ===
Braid set off on an ill-fated tour of Japan and Hawaii in April 1999. Due to lower-than-expected turnout, the band failed to recoup their losses and had to spend the rest of their revenue from previous tours, causing rifts to form within the band. After returning to the United States, Atkinson, Bell, and Nanna set off to play Krazy Fest in Louisville, Kentucky, while Broach chose to make the drive separately. Broach was late for their set, and though Braid were allowed to play the following day, this caused more conflict amongst the band members.

Soon after, Braid began work on a demo for a potential new record, but tensions surfaced by the time they finished mixing the last song of the session. After a band meeting, Nanna, Broach, Bell, and Atkinson decided to call it quits.

Braid decided to hold four final concerts in August to say goodbye to their fans. They scheduled one show in Milwaukee, two in Chicago at The Metro, and the final concert was held in their home town of Champaign where Roy Ewing played a few songs with the band.

After their final show, Braid had several post-breakup releases in 2000. A recording of their final four shows called "Killing a Camera" was released on VHS. A live album, from the final sold-out show at The Metro called "Lucky to Be Alive" was also released. Polyvinyl released a double-disc collection of non-album tracks called Movie Music, Vol. 1 and 2.

Following the disbandment, the members played in new musical projects. Shortly after Braid's break up, Nanna, Bell, and Atkinson reunited to form the pop rock band Hey Mercedes with Mark Dawursk on guitar. In addition to this, Nanna started a solo project under the name The City on Film. Chris Broach worked with his brother Riley in The Firebird Band, previously a side-project, and in 2001 he would also play with L'Spaerow and start Lucid Records.

=== First reunion: 2004 ===
In 2004, Hey Mercedes suffered problems with tour cancellations and Chris Broach was in between projects. In February 2004, Braid decided to reunite to coincide with the DVD release of Killing a Camera was reissued on DVD in May 2004. They went on a tour of the US in June and July, with Minus the Bear, Murder by Death, Recover, and Mock Orange. Following, they went by a short tour of Japan for the rest of August. After these tours were completed, Braid amicably disbanded again.

=== Second reunion and No Coast: 2011–present ===
On January 25, 2011 it was announced on Punknews.org that Braid were reuniting permanently to record a new 12-inch for Polyvinyl Records. On May 4, 2011, the band announced their first comeback show since 2004 at the Metro on August 27, 2011 and would also play at Pygmalion Music Festival on September 24, 2011, part of the Polyvinyl Records fifteenth anniversary celebration.

On June 10, 2011, the band released a song titled "The Right Time", the first from their forthcoming EP, and gave the entire EP to people who pre-ordered on the Polyvinyl web store. The new EP titled Closer to Closed, their first release in 11 years, was released on August 16, 2011, to mixed reviews.

December 22, 2011 was Braid's 600th show. The event, held at Turner Hall Ballroom in Milwaukee, was a Toys for Tots benefit show. Event-goers who brought a new, unwrapped toy would receive a commemorative poster. Braid shared the night with Smoking Popes and in addition to announcing further touring, a new release was announced.

On April 6, 2012, the band announced that they were going to play at the acclaimed Gainesville, Florida festival, The Fest. On August 10, 2012, Braid played at Union Transfer in Philadelphia, PA with polyvinyl label mate Owen. On November 3, 2012, Braid played two shows as a part of the 2012 Fun Fun Fun Fest in Austin, Texas.

On September 18, 2013, Braid announced that they had signed with Topshelf Records as well as the release of a new studio album in 2014. It was revealed on March 24, 2014 that the album was mastered and completed. The album, No Coast, was released on July 8, 2014 (their first LP in 16 years) to positive reviews.

Though they did not formally disband again, the band went inactive until February 2023 when they announced a 25th-anniversary remaster of Frame & Canvas and an accompanying U.S. tour with the album being played in full, mostly taking place in September. On September 15, 2023, Braid performed at Riot Fest, playing Frame and Canvas in its entirety. In October 2024, the band played at the Best Friends Forever festival in Nevada. On July 18, 2026, they played Quiet Steps Festival in Leeds, England.

== Musical style and influences ==
Braid's music has been described as post-hardcore, post-punk, emo, Midwest emo, punk rock, and math rock. Braid have cited numerous bands as influences, including Gauge, Shudder to Think, Fugazi, Jawbreaker, Jawbox, Samiam, Hoover, and Indian Summer.

During their initial run, Braid were known for putting on a high-energy live show. Get Up Kids frontman Matt Pryor has described their performance style at the time as "[e]nergetic, but that's underselling it. They come from a Fugazi school of punk performance. A lot of jumping, landing in weird places. A lot of disregard for the safety of your body."

== Members ==
Current

- Bob Nanna – vocals, guitar (1993–1999, 2004, 2011–present)
- Todd Bell – bass guitar (1993–1999, 2004, 2011–present)
- Chris Broach – vocals, guitar (1994–1999, 2004, 2011–present)
- Damon Atkinson – drums (1997–1999, 2004, 2011–present)

Former

- Roy Ewing – drums (1993–1997)
- Pete Havranek – guitar (1993–1994)
- Jay Ryan – bass guitar (1993)
- Kate Reuss – vocals (1993–1994)

Timeline

== Discography ==
Studio albums

- Frankie Welfare Boy Age 5 (1995)
- The Age of Octeen (1996)
- Frame & Canvas (1998)
- No Coast (2014)
