= Emergency & I =

Studio album by the Dismemberment Plan
- Released: October 26, 1999
- Recorded: 1998
- Studio: Water Music, Hoboken, New Jersey, Inner Ear, Arlington, Virginia
- Genres: Indie rock; post-punk; art punk; dance-punk; pop
- Length: 45:07
- Labels: DeSoto; Barsuk (2011 reissue)
- Producers: J. Robbins, Chad Clark

The Dismemberment Plan chronology
| The Dismemberment Plan Is Terrified (1997) | Emergency & I (1999) | Juno & The Dismemberment Plan (2001) |

Singles from Emergency & I
- 1. "What Do You Want Me to Say?" Released: November 1997

Emergency & I is the third studio album by American indie rock band the Dismemberment Plan, released in 1999 by DeSoto Records. It was produced by J. Robbins and Chad Clark, and primarily recorded at Water Music Studios in 1998, with additional recordings done at Inner Ear Studios. At its release, the album was met with critical acclaim, receiving praise for its instrumental performances and lyrics.

Initially released on CD, Barsuk Records reissued Emergency & I in vinyl format for the first time on January 11, 2011 where it received further praise from critics and listeners, with many calling it a landmark indie rock album and the band's best release.

== Background ==
After a press photoshoot for the band's second album The Dismemberment Plan Is Terrified, the band decided that they wanted to sound "less wacky" on their third album, feeling like their sound had been gradually settling down. According to bassist Eric Axelson, the album was written across seven different rehearsal spaces, and the band attempted to individually write their parts like it sounded it came from a group. He noted that vocalist and guitarist Travis Morrison "had a knack" of matching his ideas with other ideas the group developed separately. One notable example of this is the chorus to "Back and Forth", which he came up with while going to work one morning not knowing what it would sound like as a song, and then going to rehearsal later that night and finding Axelson and drummer Joe Easley playing what would be the instrumental to the song. Another example, "Spider in the Snow", involved Axelson and Easley performing their final riffs and drum parts for the song "in straight-four, like a Motown thing", until Morrison suggested they "cut a beat off the end of the phrase", resulting in the final song.

Of the other songs worked on in this period, "I Love a Magician" was quickly written in and heavily influenced by the surroundings of one rehearsal space, the basement of an office building in Falls Church, Virginia. According to Morrison: "The ceiling was like five and a half feet off the ground. I'm not sure we were supposed to be there at all. Security guards were staring at us as we wheeled in our amps. I remember Jason [Caddell] howling away with this new distortion pedal. We wrote the song around that sound, pretty much." "Memory Machine" was the first of several songs on the album that made use of an E-mu sampler, specifically making use of an "ambient noise" from an unknown song by Orchestral Manoeuvres in the Dark.

In May 1997, Nigel Harrison, the former bassist for Blondie and at the time an A&R executive for Interscope Records, attended a Dismemberment Plan concert in Allentown, Pennsylvania and eventually arranged a meeting with Interscope CEO Jimmy Iovine to discuss a record deal. The band's publicist, Jessica Hopper, was against the idea of the band signing to a major label, citing the recent death of Brainiac lead singer Tim Taylor as they were preparing to record an album for Interscope and that the label's A&R department would have been looking for a similar band to match the "quirky art-punk-dance" bands on competing labels. However, The Dismemberment Plan were more intrigued by the idea as they felt they did not fit in with other indie bands at the time and could release adventurous music under Interscope.

An early version of "What Do You Want Me to Say?" was recorded by producer J. Robbins and released as a 7-inch vinyl single backed with the song "Since You Died" in November 1997, acting as their last release for DeSoto Records before signing to the new label. Robbins noted that "The City", influenced by the band Soul Coughing, first started being written roughly two days prior to the sessions, and a portion of an early version was captured on the master tapes to the single.

== Recording ==
In 1998, The Dismemberment Plan signed a two-album deal with Interscope, and Emergency & I was recorded as the first of those proposed two albums during the band's time with the label. Using the money from Interscope, the album was recorded in three weeks at Water Music Studios in Hoboken, New Jersey.

Unlike Inner Ear Studios, the smaller recording studio in Arlington, Virginia the band used for ! and The Dismemberment Plan Is Terrified where they had to rush through albums on a budget, Water Music was a more expansive studio with its own five/six-bedroom apartment above the studio. The band had more money, time, space, and resources to work on the album in the complex, which Morrison likened to a college dormitory. Easley praised the acoustics of the wooden main recording room at Water Music, calling it "the one room I ever got to record in that was awesome for drums."

The album's producers J. Robbins and Chad Clark were described as being very opinionated about what they each wanted for the album, with Caddell describing the relationship between themselves and the band as "the passive aggressive Olympics at the beginning". Robbins kept the band in check playing at correct tempos and maintaining the recording equipment, while Clark took a Brian Eno-like role of finding ways to pursue "a wide-screen feel, pushing things far out and using the studio as an instrument", allowing the band to experiment with different keyboard sounds and amplifiers. The group had a minor conflict with Water Music's owner and head engineer Rob Grenoble, who persistently kept nudging up the treble during the mixing process for unknown reasons until they scolded him for it.

Some songs went through different stages during recording. Clark suggested that "Spider in the Snow" should use real strings or a Mellotron for its keyboard section to express the newer scope of tools and textures they had available at the studio. However, Morrison thought that using strings was "too fancy" and they decided to stick with the original Casio keyboard sound they used for live performances. Clark also originally did not want "You Are Invited" to be on Emergency & I, finding the song too sentimental. "What Do You Want Me to Say?" was originally going to have sampled turntable scratching, but the plan was scrapped because Clark thought using real scratching on that song would have been "corny" and "too obvious". Instead, Morrison ended up imitating the sound of turntable scratches with his voice at one point during the song, which Clark believed "sounded musically right and made no sense in the context of the song," but worked better than using actual turntables because he was "just freaking out and rocking to the beat." Axelson recalled that during the 1997 single's sessions, Morrison wanted to record the song without any guitars and use only keyboards and bass guitar, but this was rejected by the rest of the band. Robbins also recalled that midway through recording vocals for the album version of the song, Morrison's girlfriend called him to break up with him over the phone. This upset Morrison to the point where he lost composure and broke down crying in the middle of the recording, which Robbins referred to as "a microcosm of the record".

When the band's scheduled time at Water Music ended, they returned to Inner Ear to make additional recordings and create the album's final mix. The album was mixed to half-inch analog tape and mastered by engineer Alan Douches. Robbins and Caddell remembered there was tension during this time as the band and producers all had their own particular preferences for the album's mixing, resulting in some songs having eight different mixes before a final cut was chosen. During this process, Morrison claimed that he had a panic attack and had to be driven to a hospital by Axelson. In hindsight, he called the incident "embarrassing", as his sister (a nurse) after reading his electrocardiogram commented "If you were having a panic attack, you were really calm!"

The cover art and three other pieces adorning the album's packaging were drawn digitally by Morrison on a personal computer at Water Music in the downtime between recording sessions. He claimed he was "just doodling" with no concept in mind when designing the artwork, and that other people in the studio had nonplussed or averse reactions to it.

== Music ==
=== Style and influences ===
The album utilizes elements of soul, hip-hop, jazz, synthpop, post-punk, electro and techno. The album also makes use of sampling and odd rhythm patterns. According to Nolan James of Pacific Lutheran University: "It really does sound more like the rock music that would be released throughout the next decade, with its soft male-lead vocals and noisy, basic guitar. It is pretty forward-thinking in that way. meandering verses suddenly transition into great, climactic choruses, and likewise subdued and unexciting choruses follow intricate, well-built verses."

=== Lyrical themes ===
Morrison stated in 2011 that the lyrics were inspired by the birth of his young sister's child and the death of his father, both of which happened in quick succession, which he felt was a breakthrough into covering more personal "basic life" themes in his lyrics that he frustratingly did not know how to write in the past. Prior to the album's release, he claimed the events affected his approach to writing lyrics and that topics commonly covered in punk rock and emo lyrics "suddenly sounded hopelessly self-absorbed and adolescent and self-pitying." He started studying songs with optimistic lyrics, as well as soul and country music lyrics to search for inspiration from songs oriented towards older adults "about family, community, trust, communication […] with some sense of perspective and not from deep within one's own butt", the latter of which he claimed was a common vantage point for punk and rock lyrics that mostly "wallow in misery and heartbreak". Clark felt the death of Morrison's father loomed over the album "in a way that I think gave it a gravity." PopMatters' Zachary Houle noted that the album had themes of growing pains experienced by people in their 20s. Jeremy D. Larson of Consequence noted the influence of Stephen Malkmus on the album's lyrics.

With regards to individual songs, Morrison stated the opening track "A Life of Possibilities" was written about "the price of running away, of changing one's environs continually, of declining to commit -- something that I see a lot in many of my peers, for whatever reason". He claimed that topics covering the consequences of "adventure and individualism, especially when taken too far" were rare in rock music, and felt that "the single hardest lesson of growing up" was that everything has consequences. "You Are Invited", a song about an anonymous invitation that comes through the mail, deals with belonging and selflessness. "The City" deals with Morrison's loneliness living in a city, his longing for a wanderlust lover, and his inability to leave the city without abandoning everything that makes him who he is. The verse structures of the closing track "Back and Forth" are based on Bob Dylan's "It's Alright, Ma (I'm Only Bleeding)". Zachary Houle argued that songs such as "Memory Machine" and "What Do You Want Me to Say?" deal with themes of disconnectedness in the Information Age, including predicting the social media phenomenon that would be prominent in the following decade. The lyrics to "The Jitters" were originally written inside a copy of Charles Shaar Murray's musical biography on Jimi Hendrix, Crosstown Traffic: Jimi Hendrix & The Post-War Rock n' Roll Revolution, that Morrison had borrowed from Axelson.

Morrison claimed to have first thought of the album's title after returning to Washington, D.C. from the recording sessions on July 16, 1998, during a Shudder to Think concert at the Black Cat nightclub, but he did not know what the title meant. Paul Thompson of Pitchfork related the album title to the encroaching chaos of modern life with the self.

== Release ==
On October 16, 1998, Interscope released The Ice of Boston EP, which would turn out to be the band's first and only release on the label. The EP included the titular song originally released on The Dismemberment Plan Is Terrified, the 1997 compilation track "Just Like You", the Water Music sessions outtake "The First Anniversary of Your Last Phone Call", and a demo version of "Spider in the Snow" recorded at Inner Ear, which the band revealed in the liner notes would be featured on their upcoming third album. Morrison could not recall the logic behind why Interscope released the EP in the first place, but in retrospect described it as "not an earth-shaking release."

According to Caddell, a few months after recording for the album wrapped up in 1998, Kim Coletta, the co-owner of DeSoto Records who was still managing the band after signing to Interscope, had suddenly lost all contact with the major label. Earlier in the year, multinational conglomerate Seagram, the owner of Universal Music Group, purchased the entertainment company PolyGram for its music division. One week before the release of The Ice of Boston EP in October 1998, Seagram announced that they would be divesting the rest of PolyGram's entertainment assets and folding their music division into Universal, leading to several rounds of label restructuring. In early 1999, they decided to merge Geffen Records and the recently acquired A&M Records into Interscope, leading Universal to announce that they would cut numerous artists from Interscope.

In April 1999, while on tour with Robbins' band Burning Airlines, The Dismemberment Plan were informed they were one of the artists affected by the cut. As part of their departure from Interscope, the band was awarded $50,000, which they had been owed as part of their contract to record a second album. In turn, the band decided to release Emergency & I on their former label DeSoto Records on October 26, 1999.

Morrison recalled not feeling proud of the album until he heard two songs from it played on college radio stations while the band was on tour, and when fans started telling him they downloaded the album off of Napster.

=== Tour ===
Throughout the remainder of 1999 and 2000, The Dismemberment Plan toured the album with various acts including The Promise Ring, Juno, Alkaline Trio, and Discount. The band would see relatively small crowds of roughly 75-200 people, until the band received an email offering to tour with Pearl Jam in Europe. The band's first show on the European tour saw them with the biggest crowds of their career, with 15,000 in attendance at their first tour stop in Prague. The band looked back fondly on the European tour, with Morrison calling it the most fun he had as a touring musician.

The album's tour marked the start of a recurring tradition at the band's live shows where audience members would get on stage during "The Ice of Boston" and perform a step dance mimicking the backing singers in Gladys Knight and the Pips, who were mentioned in the song's lyrics, before devolving into jumping and moshing.

=== 2011 reissue ===
The band originally wanted Emergency & I to be released on vinyl back in 1999, but decided against that after seeing that vinyl was not a commercially viable option. After seeing a resurgence in vinyl records, the band decided to release the album on vinyl in 2011. Morrison cited sound quality and packaging as reasons he wanted it to be a vinyl release.

On January 11, 2011, Barsuk Records issued the vinyl edition of Emergency & I, which includes an oral history of the band conducted by The A.V. Club's Josh Modell. The vinyl reissue came with 4 bonus tracks. "Since You Died" was the B-side to the vinyl 7-inch release of "What Do You Want Me to Say?", an earlier recording of the song released in November 1997, before Emergency & I was recorded. "Just Like You" was originally released on the compilation EP Ft. Reno Benefit Compilation in September 1997. "The First Anniversary of Your Last Phone Call", an outtake from the Water Music sessions, was originally released on The Ice of Boston EP on October 16, 1998. "The Dismemberment Plan Gets Rich" was originally from Juno & The Dismemberment Plan, a split EP between Juno and The Dismemberment Plan released on March 27, 2001.

== Reception and legacy ==
Professional ratings
Review scores
| Source | Rating |
|---|---|
| AllMusic | 4.5/5 stars |
| Alternative Press | 4/5 |
| Beats Per Minute | 95% |
| Consequence of Sound | 5/5 stars |
| Kerrang! | 4/5 stars |
| Pitchfork | 9.6/10 (1999); 10/10 (2011) |
| PopMatters | 10/10 |
| Rolling Stone | 4/5 stars |
| The Rolling Stone Album Guide | 4/5 stars |
| Tiny Mix Tapes | 5/5 |
| The Village Voice | A− |

=== Critical response ===
Emergency & I received overwhelming critical acclaim. The album has been described by Rolling Stone as "a game-changer for indie rock fans", and Pitchfork describes it as "one of indie's key LPs". Glide Magazine called the album "[The Dismemberment Plan's] landmark masterstroke, still cited by many bands and critics as a turning point in the evolution of indie rock."

Brent DiCrescenzo of Pitchfork originally gave the album a 9.6 out of 10, with a short review that read simply, "If you consider yourself a fan of groundbreaking pop, go out and buy this album right now. Now. Get up. Go." Ned Raggett of AllMusic called the album a "firecracker" which shows the band's "at once passionate and sly approach to music—take in everything, put it back out, and give it its own particular sheen and spin—is in no danger of letting up." Robert Christgau of The Village Voice wrote "The only way [The Dismemberment Plan are] punk anymore is that there aren't very many of them and that none of them seems to be playing a keyboard even though most of them can. What they are instead is a much rarer thing [...] thoughtful, quirky, mercurial young adults skilled at transforming doubt into music."

Not all reception at the album's release was positive. Brian J. Manning of the punk zine Punk Planet, where Hopper worked as a columnist, gave the album a negative review, describing it as "Weird, soulless, boring indie rock" and concluded "I say 'Less art, more rock, please'." Despite this, a later review of the album by Amy Adoyzie in a 2005 issue of the zine was noticeably more positive, saying "The combination of the spastic guitars, loopy keyboards and throbbing drumbeats draws you in and makes you listen. The Plan has a rhythm that’s off somehow, but it doesn’t matter, because we’re all a bit off rhythm ourselves."

=== Accolades and retrospective reviews ===
Emergency & I was ranked the best album of 1999 by Pitchfork. Staff writer Steven Edelstone called the album "a stone-cold classic, a record that sounds just as fresh today as it did 20 years ago." On the same website, the album was ranked No. 16 on their "redux" version of the Top 100 Albums of the 1990s list, with William Morris writing "The album's lyric book reads better than half the modern volumes on my bookshelf. Modern R&B should have as much rhythm. Modern rock should have as much balls." In addition, the website ranked the track "The City" No. 64 on their list of the Top 200 Tracks of the 1990s. In December 2007 the album was ranked number 95 on Blender's 100 Greatest Indie-Rock Albums Ever list.

The album's 2011 vinyl reissue brought about numerous positive reviews as well. Zachary Houle of PopMatters wrote that "Just in terms of a sheer personal enjoyment factor, I would almost argue the case for a new rating: the Spinal Tap-esque 11. Emergency & I is just a relentless record, full of youthful abandon and insightful penetrations into the technology-addled brain. I just can't get enough of it." In another review of the reissue, Consequence's Jeremy D. Larson wrote: "The Plan colors this record with 12 songs that serve as hitching posts for whatever ails you. Life medicine never sounded better ... Emergency & I continues to arch its influence even after a 12-year gap." Pitchfork gave the reissue a perfect 10/10 with a "best new reissue" designation," while Sputnikmusic's Alex Robertson rated the album "classic" with a perfect 5.0. The album was ranked at number 26 on Spin's "The 300 Best Albums of the Past 30 Years (1985–2014)" list.

In the reissue's liner notes, Ben Gibbard, the frontman of Death Cab for Cutie who toured with The Dismemberment Plan following the release of their fourth studio album Change, praised Emergency & I and called it one of the albums that "helps make the yearbook of my band. And even though the record has this scholarly element, the songs still translate with very base human emotions, like love and loss and finding one's place in the world." Robbins called it one of the best albums he ever worked on.

In 2011, Morrison stated that he felt some of the album's lyrics (i.e. "What Do You Want Me to Say?") did not age well due to them being "young sounding" and very accusatory, which were feelings he found harder to keep as he aged, but nonetheless he stated was "proud of how honest it is and how unusual Emergency & l is, and how hard the four of us worked on it. I guess that's all that matters for me. If no one ever got into it, I'd still be as proud of the record. I'm proud of having done it as honestly and diligently as we could have. That it's touched some people is awesome. We got very lucky."

In 2022, Nolan James of Pacific Lutheran University said: "The album is a unique, albeit often frustrating, experience. [...] There is not a song on here with both great choruses and verses, yet the end result is a fantastic feeling of anticipation and reward." He called the album "essential listening for any 2000s indie rock fan."

== Track listing ==
All music is composed by Travis Morrison, Jason Caddell, Eric Axelson and Joe Easley.

| No. | Title | Length |
|---|---|---|
| 1. | "A Life of Possibilities" | 4:34 |
| 2. | "Memory Machine" | 2:43 |
| 3. | "What Do You Want Me to Say?" | 4:18 |
| 4. | "Spider in the Snow" | 3:50 |
| 5. | "The Jitters" | 4:19 |
| 6. | "I Love a Magician" (stylized as "I ♥ a Magician") | 2:38 |
| 7. | "You Are Invited" | 4:52 |
| 8. | "Gyroscope" | 2:29 |
| 9. | "The City" | 4:26 |
| 10. | "Girl O'Clock" | 2:54 |
| 11. | "8 1/2 Minutes" | 2:57 |
| 12. | "Back and Forth" | 5:07 |

Bonus tracks on the 2011 vinyl
| No. | Title | Length |
|---|---|---|
| 13. | "The Dismemberment Plan Gets Rich" | 2:22 |
| 14. | "Since You Died" | 4:28 |
| 15. | "Just Like You" | 4:43 |
| 16. | "The First Anniversary of Your Last Phone Call" | 4:42 |

"A Life of Possibilities", "What Do You Want Me to Say?", "The Jitters" and "The City" are all also featured in remixed form on A People's History of The Dismemberment Plan.

== Personnel ==
Personnel adapted from the liner notes to the original 1999 CD release and 2011 vinyl reissue

=== The Dismemberment Plan ===
- Eric Axelson – bass guitar, keyboards
- Jason Caddell – guitar, keyboards
- Joe Easley – drums
- Travis Morrison – vocals, guitar, keyboards

=== Technical personnel ===
- J. Robbins – production, mixing, engineering (on additional Inner Ear recordings)
- Chad Clark – production, mixing
- Rob Grenoble – engineering (on Water Music recordings)
- Don Zientara – engineering (on additional Inner Ear recordings)
- Alan Douches – mastering (original 1999 release)
- Roger Seibel – mastering (2011 reissue)

=== Artwork ===
- Travis Morrison – digital artwork on album packaging
- Mark Murrmann – keyboard photo (original 1999 release)
- Peter Dressler – photo collage (2011 reissue)
- Ted Irvine – art direction (2011 reissue)
- Josh Modell – liner notes (2011 reissue)
