= Juno & The Dismemberment Plan =

EP by Juno / The Dismemberment Plan
- Released: Mar 27, 2001
- Genre: Indie rock
- Length: 15:48
- Label: DeSoto

Juno chronology
This Is the Way It Goes & Goes & Goes (1999)	Juno & The Dismemberment Plan (2001)	A Future Lived in Past Tense (2001)

The Dismemberment Plan chronology
Emergency & I (1999)	Juno & The Dismemberment Plan (2001)	Change (2001)

Professional ratings
Review scores
Source	Rating
AllMusic	3/5 stars
Pitchfork	8.0/10

Juno & The Dismemberment Plan is a split EP by Juno and the Dismemberment Plan, released in 2001 on DeSoto Records.

== Track listing ==
Tracks 1 & 4 were recorded by the Dismemberment Plan, while tracks 2 & 3 were recorded by Juno.

1. "The Dismemberment Plan Gets Rich" – 2:22
2. "Non-Equivalents" – 3:26
3. "High Noon" (DJ Shadow) – 3:46
4. "Crush" (Jennifer Paige) – 6:14
