= Travis Morrison =

- Morrison performing in January 2011

Background information
- Born: December 16, 1972 (age 53)
- Genre: Indie rock
- Occupations: Musician; computer programmer
- Instruments: Vocals; guitar; keyboards
- Years active: 1993–2009, 2011–present
- Labels: Barsuk; DeSoto
- Website: travismorrison.com

Travis Michael Morrison (born December 16, 1972) is an American musician and web developer from Northern Virginia, United States. He is best known as leader of indie-rock band The Dismemberment Plan and as a solo artist.

== Early life ==
After picking up various instruments around age 12, Morrison stuck with guitar and began forming bands throughout his high school days at Lake Braddock Secondary School in Fairfax County, Virginia. He was on Lake Braddock's English Team and claimed to be "pathetically happy" upon defeating the English team of Thomas Jefferson High School for Science and Technology one year.

After "getting out of Fairfax" he attended The College of William and Mary in Williamsburg, Virginia for three years before dropping out to pursue a band. He worked at the campus radio station WCWM, which he claimed was "worth tuition right there." At WCWM he became well versed in many types of music, "from John Coltrane to German art rock." He continues to have wide-ranging musical taste to this very day, having claimed to enjoy everything from Britney Spears, Gladys Knight, XTC, Fugazi, Ludacris and Go-go. He finds additional inspiration in the music of Harry Nilsson, which he often listens to before a concert.

== The Dismemberment Plan ==
In 1993, Morrison formed The Dismemberment Plan with old Lake Braddock friends. Despite his mother's initial reluctance, the band practiced in bassist Eric Axelson's basement frequently and began playing shows. By 1995 they released their debut album ! on D.C. based DeSoto Records. After original drummer Steve Cummings left the band, he was replaced by Joe Easley and the band's lineup would remain that way throughout their existence. Morrison was the guitarist and vocalist for The Plan from their formation in 1993 to their final show at the 9:30 Club in D.C in 2003. The band released four LPs and two EPs and gained a large following for their energetic live show, mostly due to Morrison's "booty-shaking" moves onstage. Their final two studio albums Emergency & I and Change were some of the most revered rock albums in the late-90s and early-2000s. Despite this, the band continued to work freelance jobs on the side to support themselves, Morrison taking up various computer and graphic design jobs.

== Solo ==
In 2004, Morrison moved to Seattle, Washington, and began working closely in the studio with both Ben Gibbard and Chris Walla of Death Cab for Cutie, a frequent tourmate of The Plan. Morrison then began doing a nationwide tour of a solo show with just him and an acoustic guitar. The shows consisted of him doing mostly covers of songs varying a wide variety of genres (from Spoon to Fiddler on the Roof and beyond). He also began playing some songs he was working on for a solo album. Around this time, he posted up mp3s of songs he was working on for his solo album as well as a cover of Ludacris's "What's Your Fantasy" which was listed as a "must download" in Entertainment Weekly.

In the summer of 2004, Morrison had moved back to the D.C. area and in September 2004 he released his first solo album, Travistan, through Barsuk Records. The album was co-produced by Chris Walla.

=== Travis Morrison Hellfighters ===
In September 2004 Morrison assembled a band to play his solo songs live. Consisting of Brandon Kalber (bass, keyboards), Saadat Awan (drums), David Brown (percussion), Kristen Forbes (keyboards and backup vocals) and Morrison on vocals and keyboards. At first the band's live show consisted of three synths, percussion and drums but Morrison stated "none of us could play keyboards very well, so it was kind of hard after a while." Over time, Forbes left the band, the band introduced guitar & bass to their live sound and the band would begin touring as Travis Morrison Hellfighters. Travis and the Hellfighters continued to tour for the album and demoed new songs together. By the summer of 2005, the band had come into their own and were playing shows of entirely new material, only playing the occasional Travistan song. Travis and the Hellfighters have finished a new album, titled All Y'all, that was released on August 21, 2007, and is currently streaming on Travis' website and was produced by Travis's former bandmate, Jason Cadell. The album was mixed by Joel Hamilton.

The final Hellfighters lineup (as of 2009) was:

- Travis Morrison
- David Brown
- Brandon Kalber
- Vince Magno
- Thomas Orgren

== "Retirement" and current activities ==
In the summer of 2009, Morrison's official website was updated to state that he has retired from making music, and that there will be no more shows, records or bands. When The Dismemberment Plan reunited for shows in early 2011, Morrison said of the 'retirement', "I think I just didn’t have any plans for any solo music, and I just think I thought it sounded funny to say I was retiring ... I mean, it seems more fun than to say, 'I have no plans.'" In March 2011, he told Glide Magazine that Time Travel plans on making an album. In May 2012, D.C. label Bad Friend Records released a 7" of previously unheard material the Travis Morrison Hellfighters recorded before breaking up.

== Personal life ==
As of 2026, Morrison lives in Durham county, North Carolina, works as a computer programmer (formerly at The Washington Post and then Huffington Post), and is married to journalist and podcaster Katherine Goldstein.

Morrison's other singing outlet has been regular participation in an Episcopal Church choir.

== Trumpeter of D.C. culture ==
Morrison is notable for being very vocal about the culture of the Washington, D.C. area. Morrison has always insisted on touring with fellow D.C. acts, both with The Plan and solo. Despite releasing Travistan on Barsuk Records, he remains supportive of D.C.-based DeSoto Records. In his lyrics he makes mention to the area (see below), the liner notes to Change feature photos taken around Washington, D.C., notably of The Uptown Theatre. The logo for Travistan resembles the flag of the District of Columbia. He's a very active fan of Washington area sports, mainly the Washington Wizards. He placed a link on his website to an online petition to change the name of the Washington Nationals to the Washington Grays in honor of the old D.C. Negro leagues team. Both with The Plan and solo he frequently played and continues to play shows at D.C. live venue staples Black Cat, Fort Reno and the 9:30 Club. He has kicked around the idea of doing a tour of the outlying suburbs of D.C since he once lived in Lorton, Virginia, and knows how difficult it can be to get downtown for a show.

Recently around D.C. he has also done volunteer work with We Are Family D.C., a non-profit organization and returned to his William & Mary days by DJing with WMUC at the University of Maryland, College Park. He has also sung in several D.C. area church choirs, including a recent season with the National Cathedral.

In 2005 through most of 2007 Morrison lived in the Capitol Hill neighborhood of Washington, DC with his girlfriend and worked for the website of The Washington Post, heading their advertising programming and production department.

=== D.C. lyrical references ===
Morrison frequently refers to D.C. area locations and themes in his songs. References include:

- The song "13th and Euclid" (!) is named after an intersection in Northwest D.C.
- In "Fantastic!" (!): "I wouldn't go so far as to call it escape, but I'll head my way up I-95"
- In "I'm Going to Buy You a Gun" (!): "I'm going to take you out on I-95"
- In "The Ice of Boston" (The Dismemberment Plan is Terrified): "...and I say 'oh fine, mom; how's Washington?!'"
- The song "The City" (Emergency and I) is about D.C.
- In "Spider in the Snow" (Emergency & I): "And as I would walk down K Street to some temping job, as winter froze life out of fall, I must have been having a ball."
- In "Ellen and Ben" (Change): "The Ocean City girls on the boardwalk, singing oh oh oh oh oh oh oh oh"
- In "My Two Front Teeth Parts 2 & 3" (Travistan): "In front of the Gap at the corner of M and Wisconsin" - the song illustrates a Georgetown mugging, in which the narrator loses his two front teeth, as a metaphor for the September 11, 2001 attacks ("The second I saw, but the first was sucker-punch city.")
- In "Born in '72" (Travistan): The verse which starts, "Can't ask for more so we're unfulfilled," up to, "through and through," is a lyrical and rhythmic reference to Fugazi's "Break", the opening track on their 1998 album, "End Hits".
- In "Get Me Off This Coin D" (Travistan): "You named a town, after me now, and no one there can vote" (from the perspective of George Washington, the last of a series of songs commemorating the four presidents on common United States coinage)
- In "Hawkins' Rock" (All Y'All): "Drivin' down I-95, son" and "Drivin' down I-81, yeah"
- In "I Do" (All Y'All): "swimming through the heat of a D.C. dawn"
- "East Side of the River" (All Y'All) is about the part of Washington, DC, east of the Anacostia River.

== Discography ==
=== The Dismemberment Plan ===
- Can We Be Mature? (EP) (1994)
- ! (1995)
- Give Me the Cure (compilation) (1996)
- Ooh Do I Love You (compilation) (1996)
- The Dismemberment Plan Is Terrified (1997)
- Fort Reno Benefit (compilation) (1997)
- What Do You Want Me to Say? (single) (1997)
- The Ice of Boston (EP) (1998)
- Emergency & I (1999)
- Dismemberment Plan/Juno (split EP) (2000)
- Change (2001)
- A People's History of the Dismemberment Plan (compilation) (2003)
- Live in Japan 2011 (2011)
- Uncanney Valley (2013)

=== Solo ===
- Travistan (2004)

=== Travis Morrison Hellfighters ===
- All Y'All (2007)
- Cruisin' (All Night Long) (single) (2012)

=== The Burlies ===
- The Burlies EP (2014)
