= All Y'all =

All Y'all may refer to:

- "All Y'all" (song), a 2001 song by Timbaland & Magoo
- All Y'all (album), a 2007 album by Travis Morrison Hellfighters
