= Boys Life (band) =

American indie rock band

- Origin: Kansas City, Missouri, U.S.
- Genres: Midwest emo, math rock, post-hardcore
- Years active: 1993–1997, 2015, 2024
- Labels: Crank!, Headhunter, Cargo, Topshelf, Hit It!, Numero Group
- Spinoffs: Canyon, Lullaby for the Working Class, Matt Suggs, The Farewell Bend, Six Bells
- Past members: Brandon Butler; Joe Winkle; John Rejba; John Anderson; Dave Banaka

Boys Life was an American indie rock band from Kansas City, Missouri, formed in 1993.

== History ==
Boys Life initially consisted of Brandon Butler (vocals, guitar), Joe Winkle (guitar), John Rejba (bass), and Dave Banaka (drums), though Banaka would soon be replaced by John Anderson. Early on, Boys Life was influenced by such bands as Fugazi, Pitchfork, and Jawbox.

A number of the band's early releases came out on indie label Crank! A Record Company, included their self-titled debut full-length Boys Life. According to guitarist Joe Winkle, Boys Life left Crank! upon discovering that the label was seeking financing from major record company Interscope Records. Winkle has alleged that Crank! released them from their three-album deal on the condition that the band waive their rights to their debut and other EPs released on the label.

The band only released two albums during their original time together, but were foundational in the emo genre.

Band members went on to form other bands such as Canyon and Lullaby for the Working Class. Brandon Butler has also released several albums of solo material under his own name and formed the band Six Bells in 2014, who released their debut album in late 2015. In 2015, Boys Life reissued their second full-length Departures and Landfalls on Topshelf Records, and announced a brief reunion tour.

In 2024, Numero Group formally announced they would be reissuing the band's material. A compilation of the band's two albums, singles, and self-titled demo was released later that year, titled Home Is A Highway. In celebration of the release, the band reunited once again for a series of shows around Kansas City. In 2025, Boys Life announced they were releasing a new EP titled "Ordinary Wars" on Spartan Records. The band has also issued a lead single for the EP, titled "Ordinary War".

== Influence ==
Despite their short time together, their influence on the genre was seen after their disbandment, specifically having influencing Taking Back Sunday.

The band's own influences included Jawbreaker, specifically their song "Tour Song".

== Band members ==
- Brandon Butler – vocals, guitar
- Joe Winkle – guitar
- John Rejba – bass
- John Anderson – drums

== Discography ==
=== Studio albums ===
- Boys Life (1995, Crank! Records)
- Departures and Landfalls (1996, Headhunter Records/Cargo Records, 2015 reissue, Topshelf Records)

=== Live albums ===
- Live in Washington DC (2020)

=== EPs and singles ===
- Boys Life demo (1993)
- Split with Giants Chair (1993, Hit It! Recordings)
- "Lister/Without Doubt" (1994, Synergy Records)
- Split 7-inch with Secular Theme (1994, Flapjack Records)
- "Breaker Breaker + 1" (Synergy Records)
- Split with Vitreous Humor (1994, Crank! Records)
- Split with Christie Front Drive (1996, Crank! Records)
- "Sight Unseen" (2023, Numero Group)
- "Breaker Breaker" (2023, Numero Group)
- "Temporary" (2023, Numero Group)
- "Worn Thin" (2023, Numero Group)
- "Strike 3" (2024, Numero Group)
- "Cloudy+47" (2024, Numero Group)

=== Compilations ===
- Home Is A Highway (2024, Numero Group)

=== Compilation appearances ===
- "Signing Off" on Kansas City Misery (1995, Red Decibel)
- "Sight Unseen (live)" on (don't forget to) breathe (1997, Crank! Records)
- "A Quarter's Worth" on Fuck That Weak Shit (1997, Crank! Records)
- "Temporary" on Stay Tuned For The Holidays (2000, Crank! Records)
