= Uncanney Valley =

Studio album by The Dismemberment Plan
- Released: October 14, 2013
- Genre: Indie rock, post-hardcore, post-punk revival
- Length: 37:29
- Label: Partisan
- Producer: Jason Caddell

The Dismemberment Plan chronology
A People's History of The Dismemberment Plan (2003)	Uncanney Valley (2013)

Singles from Uncanney Valley
- 1. "Waiting" Released: July 16, 2013; 2. "Invisible" Released: August 19, 2013; 3. "Daddy Was a Real Good Dancer" Released: September 11, 2013

Professional ratings
Aggregate scores
Source	Rating
AnyDecentMusic?	6.0/10
Metacritic	59/100
Review scores
Source	Rating
AllMusic	3/5 stars
The A.V. Club	C+
Cuepoint (Expert Witness)	A−
Exclaim!	8/10
Los Angeles Times	1/4 stars
NME	6/10
Pitchfork	4.5/10
Rolling Stone	3.5/5 stars
Slant Magazine	3.5/5 stars
Spin	7/10

Uncanney Valley is the fifth studio album by American indie rock band The Dismemberment Plan. The album was released on Partisan Records on October 14, 2013, and is the band's first album since their initial break-up following the release of 2001's Change. Three singles from the album were released on streaming services prior to the album's release: "Waiting", "Invisible", and "Daddy Was a Real Good Dancer". The release of the lead single "Waiting" was teased with a promotional phone line that when dialed would play the song in low audio quality; the song would later receive a music video on October 16.

== Track listing ==
All music is composed by Travis Morrison, Jason Caddell, Eric Axelson and Joe Easley.

No.	Title	Length
1.	"No One's Saying Nothing"	3:29
2.	"Waiting"	2:49
3.	"Invisible"	3:38
4.	"White Collar White Trash"	3:41
5.	"Living in Song"	2:45
6.	"Lookin'"	5:20
7.	"Daddy Was a Real Good Dancer"	3:35
8.	"Mexico City Christmas"	4:21
9.	"Go and Get It"	4:00
10.	"Let's Just Go to the Dogs Tonight"	3:51

== Personnel ==
=== The Dismemberment Plan ===
- Eric Axelson – bass guitar, keyboards
- Jason Caddell – guitar, keyboards
- Joe Easley – drums
- Travis Morrison – vocals, guitar, keyboards

=== Additional personnel ===
- Paul Kolderie – mixing
- Ken Rich – label design
- J. Robbins – engineering
- Bob Weston – mastering

== Charts ==
Chart (2013)	Peak position
US Heatseekers Albums (Billboard)	8
