= Lula Divinia =

Studio album by Shiner
- Released: March 11, 1997
- Genre: Post-hardcore, math rock
- Length: 54:30
- Label: Hit It! Recordings
- Producer: Shiner

Shiner chronology
Splay (1996)	Lula Divinia (1997)	Starless (2000)

Professional ratings
Review scores
Source	Rating
AllMusic	2.5/5 stars

Lula Divinia is the second studio album by American post-hardcore band Shiner. It was released in March 1997 on Hit It! Recordings, in partnership with DeSoto Records. The album was recorded at the Chicago Recording Company in the summer of 1996 and mixed in Kansas City by the band and Ken Waagner.

== Critical reception ==
The Houston Press called the album a "teeth-jarring, brain-teasing mathematically precise [demonstration] of abrasive virtuosity." Orlando Weekly called it a "math-rock masterpiece." The Chicago Tribune wrote that the album "tastefully mixes catchy hooks, gnarled noise and old-fashioned sonic whomp into a King Creamson-ish blast."

== Track listing ==
- All songs written by Allen Epley and Shiner.
1. "The Situationist" – 4:44
2. "Christ Sized Shoes" – 2:52
3. "My Life as a Housewife" – 3:51
4. "Lula" – 4:04
5. "Third Gear Scratch" – 3:17
6. "Sideways" – 4:20
7. "Pinned" – 3:05
8. "Shelflife" – 2:38
9. "Jim's Lament" – 3:53
10. "Four Feet of Fence" – 5:10
11. "Cake" – 5:49
12. "Sleep It Off" – 4:23
13. "Two Black Eyes" – 6:23

== Personnel ==
- Allen Epley – vocals, guitar
- Paul Malinowski – bass guitar
- Tim Dow – drums
- Shiner – production
