= Face of the Earth =

Face of the Earth may refer to:

- "The Face of the Earth", translation of Das Antlitz der Erde, a geologic work by Eduard Suess
- "Face of the Earth", a song by Days of the New from Days of the New (the Orange album)
- "Face of the Earth", a song by tobyMac from Portable Sounds
- "The Face of the Earth", a song by The Dismemberment Plan from Change
