= The Dismemberment Plan Is Terrified =

Studio album by The Dismemberment Plan
- Released: March 17, 1997
- Recorded: Inner Ear Studios
- Genre: Post-hardcore
- Length: 44:52
- Label: DeSoto

The Dismemberment Plan chronology
! (1995)	The Dismemberment Plan Is Terrified (1997)	Emergency & I (1999)

Singles from The Dismemberment Plan Is Terrified
- 1. "The Ice of Boston" Released: October 16, 1998

The Dismemberment Plan Is Terrified is the second studio album by American indie rock band The Dismemberment Plan. It was released on March 17, 1997, on DeSoto Records. The album received positive reviews from critics, and got the band to sign with major record label Interscope.

== Composition ==
Musically, the album can be described as a bridge between hardcore and noise rock. The track "That's When the Party Started" has a synthpop feel, while the fourth track on the album, "Academy Award", is featured as a remix by Cex on the band's final album A People's History of the Dismemberment Plan. It is the only song from The Dismemberment Plan Is Terrified to be remixed for it. "The Ice of Boston" was later released on an extended play of the same name on October 16, 1998, during their brief stint with Interscope Records. The song is spoken-word and contains references to songwriter Jonathan Richman and singer-songwriter Gladys Knight's song "Midnight Train to Georgia". Dismemberment Plan lead singer Travis Morrison described the album as "very confrontational", saying "it's the least melodic record we have, it's the most dedicated to hip-hop record we have".

== Reception ==
Professional ratings
Review scores
Source	Rating
AllMusic	3/5 stars
Christgau's Consumer Guide	A−
The Rolling Stone Album Guide	3/5 stars
Tiny Mix Tapes	5/5

The Dismemberment Plan Is Terrified received positive reviews from music critics. Brian Raftery of AllMusic commented that the album was not as good as The Dismemberment Plan's debut album, !, but nevertheless named "That's When the Party Started", "The Ice of Boston", and "Do the Standing Still" as standout tracks of the album. In Metro, Nicky Baxter praised the album for being "wonderfully varied", finding that "no two tracks sound alike" and ultimately describing it as "a mess that's hard to resist."

American music critic Robert Christgau called the album "surprisingly thoughtful for post-hardcore", stating that it sounds "sort of the way Primus might sound if Primus enjoyed a normal sex life." Christgau also praised "the way the guitars and such come crashing down to break up a good party and set off a better one." Joe Garden of The A.V. Club published a positive review, saying "Odds are good that you'll find something you like right off the bat, and the rest will grow on you before you realize it." Tiny Mix Tapes wrote that with The Dismemberment Plan Is Terrified, the band "completely annihilates the term sophomore slump". Despite The Dismemberment Plan Is Terrified not being "radio friendly", it led to major record label Interscope Records signing the band due to its strength.

== Track listing ==
All music is composed by The Dismemberment Plan.

No.	Title	Length
1.	"Tonight We Mean It"	2:55
2.	"That's When the Party Started"	3:49
3.	"The Ice of Boston"	4:55
4.	"Academy Award"	2:26
5.	"Bra"	3:06
6.	"Do the Standing Still"	2:01
7.	"This Is the Life"	4:06
8.	"One Too Many Blows to the Head"	4:04
9.	"It's So You"	2:17
10.	"Manipulate Me"	2:38
11.	"Respect Is Due"	12:35
12.	"The First Anniversary of Your Last Phone Call" (Japanese bonus track)	4:43
13.	"Just Like You" (Japanese bonus track)	4:39

== Personnel ==
The following people were involved in the making of The Dismemberment Plan Is Terrified:

The Dismemberment Plan

- Eric Axelson – bass
- Jason Caddell – guitar
- Joe Easley – drums
- Travis Morrison – vocals, guitar

Production

- Chad Clark and Don Zientara – recording
