= TAG Recordings =

- Founded: 1994
- Defunct: 1996
- Status: Inactive
- Genre: Alternative rock
- Country of origin: United States

TAG Recordings was an imprint of Atlantic Records, created in 1994 to host Atlantic's stable of alternative rock artists and capitalize on the genre's popularity at that time. The roster consisted of artists already signed to Atlantic, such as The Lemonheads and Jawbox, and bolstered with new signings like Fountains of Wayne, Dinosaur Jr. bassist Mike Johnson, and The Bottle Rockets. TAG also released soundtrack CDs for two movies, White Man's Burden (1995) and I Shot Andy Warhol (1996).

Despite wide acclaim for many of their releases, like Fountains of Wayne's self-titled debut or their reissue of The Bottle Rockets' The Brooklyn Side, the imprint fared poorly in terms of sales. Jawbox's self-titled album, released in July 1996, was particularly disappointing, both critically and commercially. Within months, a corporate shakeup had occurred at Atlantic, and the TAG imprint was shut down by the end of the year. Only The Bottle Rockets and Fountains of Wayne were retained by Atlantic, and both bands went on to have problematic relationships with their parent label, each only releasing one further album before moving on to other labels.

== Former artists ==
- The Bottle Rockets
- Dead Hot Workshop
- Fountains of Wayne
- Fuzzy
- Chris Holmes (Yum-Yum)
- The Inbreds
- Jawbox
- Mike Johnson
- The Lemonheads
- Pet (Lisa Papineau & Tyler Bates)
- Rusty
- Solution A.D.

== TAG Records ==
A company unrelated to TAG Recordings operated under the similar name TAG Records. It was a short-lived imprint of Island Records, launched in 2008 by Jermaine Dupri (in his former position as Island's President of Urban Music) in partnership with Procter & Gamble's TAG Body Spray. Brooklyn rapper Q Da Kid was the first artist to be signed to the label, and his 2008 promo-only single "On a Mission" was ultimately the label's only release before they quietly folded in 2009.

== See also ==
- List of record labels
