= Identikit (album) =

Studio album by Burning Airlines
- Released: 8 May 2001
- Recorded: June – December 2000
- Genres: Rock, post-hardcore
- Length: 44:56
- Labels: DeSoto (U.S.); Arctic Rodeo Recordings (Germany)

Burning Airlines chronology
Mission: Control! (1999)	Identikit (2001)

Professional ratings
Review scores
Source	Rating
Allmusic	3/5 stars

Identikit is the second and final album by American rock band Burning Airlines, released in 2001. In 2012, the German label Arctic Rodeo Recordings reissued the album as a marbled colour vinyl LP with enclosed CD in an edition of 700 copies (200 on white/blue, 250 on gold/white, 250 on red/black), with an added cover version of Sweet's "Action."

== Background and recording ==
The drum and bass parts on Identikit were recorded live. The album was recorded in two sessions, one at a studio in Baltimore with engineer John Agnello and one recorded by Burning Airlines frontman J. Robbins at Inner Ear Studios.

Robbins has stated that the album's title, a reference to the investigative tool, was chosen because of "the suggestion that you could just put together a whole identity out of ready-made items."

== Reception ==
Cleveland Scene's Brian Baker praised Identikit as "an amazing work by any yardstick," and wrote that the album "shows off Burning Airlines' existing love of Gang of Four's clockwork groove, the Pixies' muscular noise pop, and XTC's harmonic pop sense, amped up and exaggerated effectively."

== Track listing ==
All songs written by J. Robbins, except where noted.

1. "Outside the Aviary" – 1:50
2. "Morricone Dancehall" – 2:52
3. "A Lexicon" – 3:28
4. "A Song with No Words" – 3:56
5. "All Sincerity" – 2:40
6. "The Surgeon's House" – 3:59
7. "The Deluxe War Baby" – 3:32
8. "Everything Here Is New" – 3:18
9. "Paper Crowns" – 2:46
10. "Blind Trial" – 2:25
11. "Identikit" – 3:17
12. "Election-Night Special" - 2:05
13. "Tastykake" – 4:14
14. "Earthbound" – 2:09
15. "Dear Hilary" (Scott Ritcher) – 2:31
16. "Action" - 3:33 (Andy Scott, Brian Connolly, Steve Priest, Mick Tucker) (2012 reissue)

== Personnel ==
- J.Robbins – vocals, guitars, noises
- Mike Harbin – bass guitar, sounds, "good judgement"
- Peter Moffett – drums, percussion, idiophone, membranophones, backing vocals, "things that go plunk, plink, And ting-a-ling"
