= A Future Lived in Past Tense =

Studio album by Juno
- Released: May 8, 2001
- Genre: Indie rock
- Length: 69:54
- Label: DeSoto
- Producer: Kip Beelman

Juno chronology
This Is the Way It Goes and Goes and Goes (1999)	A Future Lived in Past Tense (2001)

Professional ratings
Review scores
Source	Rating
Allmusic	4/5 stars
Kerrang!	5/5 stars
NME	8/10 stars
Pitchfork Media	(6.7/10)

A Future Lived in Past Tense is the second and final studio album by Seattle band Juno, released in 2001 on DeSoto Records.

== Track listing ==
1. "A Thousand Motors Pressed Upon the Heart" – 4:44
2. "Covered with Hair" – 5:43
3. "When I Was in ______" – 5:27
4. "Help Is on the Way" – 5:29
5. "The Trail of Your Blood In the Snow" – 5:27
6. "The French Letter" – 10:12
7. "Up Through the Night" – 3:15
8. "Things Gone and Things Still Here (We'll Need the Machine Guns By Next March)" – 8:12
9. "We Slept In Rented Rooms (The Old School Bush)" – 9:17
10. "You Are the Beautiful Conductor of This Orchestra" – 4:10
11. "Killing It in a Quiet Way" – 6:51
12. (Silence) – 0:50
13. "I'm Sorry You're Having Trouble... Goodbye" – 0:09
