= Savory (song) =

Single by Jawbox

from the album For Your Own Special Sweetheart
- Released: February 1994 (USA)
- Recorded: August–September 1993
- Genre: Post-hardcore; emo; jangle pop
- Length: 4:38 (album version); 4:20 (edit)
- Label: Atlantic
- Songwriters: J. Robbins; Bill Barbot; Kim Coletta; Zach Barocas
- Producers: Ted Niceley, Jawbox

Jawbox singles chronology
"Jackpot Plus!" (1993)	"Savory" (1994)	"Cooling Card" (1994)

"Savory" (released as "Savory + 3") is the first single released by Jawbox from their 1994 major label debut, For Your Own Special Sweetheart. The song is a description of the female body, according to AllMusic, but in a very cryptic form. The three other songs from the single were later included as bonus tracks for the 2009 reissue of For Your Own Special Sweetheart.

== Music video ==
The music video was released in early 1994 and gained some MTV airplay, particularly on programs like 120 Minutes, but the song never charted. The Paul Andresen-directed video depicts Jawbox performing at a little girl's birthday party, where the birthday girl receives an assortment of unusual gifts, including weapons and dentures. The video shows the band dressed in formal suits, a change from their old video for "Cutoff". It was reviewed on Beavis and Butt-head in a positive form, but the duo talked about how the video reminded them of Stewart's birthday party.

== Reception ==
Pitchfork said, "Instead of gambling on the tidy production style that decided many a punk band's fate at the time, the Dischord expats drilled deeper into their fiery essence for the first single off their major label debut. Propelled by an evil swing with dangerous riptides underneath, the song keeps things tense even in the tuneful chorus."

== Cover version ==
The song was covered as a collaborative effort between members of the band Far and Chino Moreno of Deftones. The song was released in 1997 on Far's EP Soon. It was re-released on the Deftones' 2005 release B-Sides & Rarities and their 2011 cover compilation album, Covers.

== Track listing ==
All tracks are written by Jawbox, except where noted.

No.	Title	Writer(s)	Length
1.	"Savory" (LP Version)		4:38
2.	"Lil' Shaver"		2:10
3.	"68"		3:17
4.	"Sound on Sound" (Big Boys cover)	Tim Kerr, Chris Gates	4:06
