= Jawbox (album) =

Studio album by Jawbox
- Released: July 2, 1996
- Recorded: January 1996
- Studios: Water, Hoboken, New Jersey
- Genres: Post-hardcore; post-punk
- Length: 47:46
- Labels: Atlantic/TAG (1996); Desoto (re-release)
- Producers: John Agnello, Jawbox

Jawbox chronology
| For Your Own Special Sweetheart (1994) | Jawbox (1996) | The Revisionist (2022) |

Singles from Jawbox
- 1. "Absenter"/"Chinese Fork Tie" Released: 1996

Jawbox is the fourth and most recent album by American post-hardcore band Jawbox. The album was released by TAG Recordings, a subsidiary of Atlantic Records. In the months following the album's release, the band was dropped from TAG and thus from Atlantic.

The album is much more commercial than its predecessor, For Your Own Special Sweetheart. Music videos were produced for the tracks "Mirrorful" and Tori Amos cover "Cornflake Girl", with the latter being a hidden track. The cover became a surprise (albeit minor) hit in the alternative and college radio scene, thus the video was filmed. The cover was omitted from the album's 2015 LP reissue. Along with those two tracks, promotional singles were also created for "Absenter" and "His Only Trade".

It was Jawbox's final studio album before disbanding in 1997.

== Writing and recording ==
According to singer-guitarist J. Robbins, the album was heavily informed by the band's experience making For Your Special Sweetheart with producer Ted Niceley, who meticulously examined their performance and songs:

Before Sweetheart, we were just a punk rock band bashing in the basement. After Sweetheart, we never really bashed in the basement too much again without consulting a click track and making demos of everything we did and thinking about the vocal phrasing and all this craft stuff that we didn't really have a handle on before. Most of the writing process of this self-titled record was much more conscious of arrangement and ideal tempo and all this subtler, but more inherently musical [stuff]. When we went in to do Sweetheart, the whole process was about the mechanics, and when we went to do the Jawbox record, it was a much more musical process because we'd been so obsessed with the mechanics before we even got in the studio. [Jawbox producer] John Agnello is sort of the opposite of Ted in the way that Ted was extremely meticulous about our performances, and with John we would do a take all together.

Robbins has stated that "Mirrorful" is about "my memory of my education, about history, and about how it's slanted, how it's propaganda—the history that you're taught in school." Drummer Zach Barocas wrote many of the lyrics for "Livid" and "Won't Come Off." Robbins has described "Spoiler" as being about "someone who purposely fucks stuff up", while "Desert Sea" is about the Salton Sea.

Robbins and singer-guitarist Bill Barbot approached "Spoiler" with "the formal economy of an old Beatles song", attempting "to be as clear and as concise and present as it can be, and really write around the vocal melody." According to Robbins, he and Barbot were influenced by Moonshake while making the album, which particularly impacted the songs "Empire of One" and "Capillary Life."

== Critical reception ==
Professional ratings
Review scores
| Source | Rating |
|---|---|
| AllMusic | 4/5 stars |
| The Encyclopedia of Popular Music | 4/5 stars |
| Entertainment Weekly | B |
| MusicHound Rock | 3.5/5 stars |
| NME | 7/10 |
| Pitchfork | 7.6/10 |
| Punknews.org | 5/5 stars |
| Sputnikmusic | 3.5/5 |
| Tiny Mix Tapes | 5/5 marks |

Trouser Press wrote: "Moody, driven and downbeat (save for the occasional sanguine moment, like the rousing 'Excandescent'), Jawbox is a work of integrity and passion from a pop band that refuses to write pop songs." Tiny Mix Tapes called the album "a masterpiece of driving, angular rock prowess."

== Track listing ==
All tracks are written by Jawbox, except for "Cornflake Girl", written by Tori Amos.

| No. | Title | Length |
|---|---|---|
| 1. | "Mirrorful" | 3:02 |
| 2. | "Livid" | 3:55 |
| 3. | "Iodine" | 3:35 |
| 4. | "His Only Trade" | 1:58 |
| 5. | "Chinese Fork Tie" | 2:29 |
| 6. | "Won't Come Off" | 2:46 |
| 7. | "Excandescent" | 4:25 |
| 8. | "Spoiler" | 2:28 |
| 9. | "Desert Sea" | 3:05 |
| 10. | "Empire of One" | 2:48 |
| 11. | "Mule/Stall" | 1:56 |
| 12. | "Nickel Nickel Millionaire" | 2:35 |
| 13. | "Capillary Life" | 3:22 |
| 14. | "Absenter" ("Absenter" ends at 3:10; the hidden track "Cornflake Girl" begins at 5:02) | 9:22 |

== Personnel ==
Jawbox

- J. Robbins – vocals, guitar, Hammond organ
- Bill Barbot – guitar, Hammond organ, saxophone, vocals
- Kim Coletta – bass, vocals
- Zach Barocas – drums

Production

- John Agnello – producer, engineer, mixing
- Wayne Dorrell, Juan Garcia, Jeff Gatens – assistant engineers
- Jason Farrell – cover art
