= Schadenfreude (album) =

Studio album by Shiner
- Released: May 8, 2020
- Studio: Massive Sound, Shawnee, Kansas, United States
- Genre: Post-hardcore
- Length: 38:20
- Language: English
- Label: Two Black Eyes, Brutal Panda

Shiner chronology
The Egg (2001)	Schadenfreude (2020)

Schadenfreude is a 2020 studio album by American post-hardcore band Shiner, their first release in almost 20 years. The album comes after Shiner reunited for a series of performances in the 2010s and reissued all of their previous studio albums as vinyl LPs. After slowly piecing together musical fragments and songs from individual band members and demoing in 2018, the band finalized the recordings and released it in 2020. The reunited band supported the album with a tour through 2022.

== Reception ==
Writing for Exclaim!, Chris Ayers gave Schadenfreude nine out of 10, praising the musicianship, songwriting, and mixing. Chris Deville of Stereogum gave a positive reception to lead singles "Life as a Mannequin" and "Paul P Pogh". Members of Hopesfall picked their favorite albums of 2020 for BrooklynVegan, listing this at second place.

== Track listing ==
1. "In the End" – 3:50
2. "Life as a Mannequin" – 6:31
3. "Genuflect" – 4:07
4. "Nothing" – 3:34
5. "Low Hanging Fruit" – 6:04
6. "Paul P Pogh" – 3:58
7. "Swallow" – 6:56
8. "O Captain" – 3:20

== Personnel ==
Shiner

- Allen Epley – voice, guitar, Rhodes electric piano, additional recording, production
- Jason Gerken – drums, cymbals, production
- Paul Malinowski – bass guitar, recording, mixing, production
- Josh Newton – guitar, additional mixing, layout, production

Additional personnel

- Mike McKenney – artwork
- Mike Nolte – mastering at Eureka Mastering, Portland, Oregon, United States

== See also ==
- List of 2020 albums
