= The Egg (album) =

Studio album by Shiner
- Released: October 23, 2001
- Recorded: March 2001
- Genre: Post-hardcore, math rock
- Length: 49:09
- Label: DeSoto
- Producer: J. Robbins; Jason Livermore

Shiner chronology
| Starless (2000) | The Egg (2001) | Schadenfreude (2020) |

Professional ratings
Review scores
| Source | Rating |
|---|---|
| AllMusic | 4.5/5 stars |
| Pitchfork | 7.4/10 |

The Egg is the fourth studio album by post-hardcore band Shiner. It was released in 2001 on DeSoto Records.

== Track listing ==
All tracks are written by Allen Epley and Shiner, except where noted.

| No. | Title | Music | Length |
|---|---|---|---|
| 1. | "The Truth About Cows" | | 3:21 |
| 2. | "Surgery" | | 3:23 |
| 3. | "Play Dead" | | 3:30 |
| 4. | "The Top of the World" | | 4:11 |
| 5. | "The Egg" | | 5:42 |
| 6. | "Andalusia" | Epley, Newton, Shiner | 3:56 |
| 7. | "Bells and Whistles" | | 4:12 |
| 8. | "The Simple Truth" | | 7:57 |
| 9. | "Spook the Herd" | | 2:29 |
| 10. | "Pills" | | 4:53 |
| 11. | "Stoned" | | 5:27 |
| Total length: | | | 49:01 |

== Personnel ==
- Allen Epley – vocals, guitar
- Paul Malinowski – bass guitar, bass synth, engineering
- Jason Gerken – drums
- Josh Newton – guitar, keyboards
- Matt Talbott – keyboards
- J. Robbins – vocals, engineering
- Jason Livermore – engineering
