= The Vox Jaguars =

American garage rock revival band

- Origin: Santa Cruz, California
- Genres: Alternative rock, Garage rock revival, Garage punk, Indie rock, Neo-psychedelia
- Years active: 2006–2010
- Label: Anodyne Records
- Past members: Jordan Topf; Noah Bond; Sam Copperman; Mason Rosenberg; Trevor Hope; Luke David; Justin Fisher
- Website: www.myspace.com/thevoxjaguars

The Vox Jaguars was a North American garage rock revival band that formed in Santa Cruz, California in 2006, influenced by artists such as The Stooges, MC5, and The Velvet Underground. The Vox Jaguars have performed with The Fiery Furnaces, Big Brother & The Holding Company, Grand Ole Party, and Scissors For Lefty.

== Career ==
The original lineup featured Jordan Topf (vocals, guitar), Justin Fisher (keyboard), and Mason Rosenberg (drums). They began their career with performances in local coffee houses and record stores. Fisher left the band to attend college in Portland which led to an addition of new personnel and rearrangements. Mason Rosenberg moved to bass, and Trevor Hope was introduced to drums. The second incarnation of the Vox Jaguars was a power trio in 2007.

The band's demo CD, Out of Luck, was recorded by Luke David, and featured four tracks: "Swagger", "Frail", "Good As Gone", and "Metropolis". Every track featured an electric organ played by Luke David and Mason Rosenberg. The song "Swagger" was used in the season finale of FOX TV's short-run prime-time TV series Canterbury's Law in April 2008.

After touring the west coast of the United States a couple of times, Rosenberg broke his hand in a bicycle accident, and was temporarily replaced by Sam Copperman. When Rosenberg recovered from his injury, Copperman was retained as keyboardist. Occasionally, Luke David played keyboards when Copperman was unavailable. When the band played acoustic sets, Copperman played stand-up bass and Rosenberg played toy piano.

The band released a self-titled EP on Anodyne Records on February 10, 2009. Produced by Ariel Rechtshaid, the tracks were recorded at the Sunset Lodge Studios in Los Angeles. The EP features four tracks: "Swagger", "Song for the Girl", "Wild Orphan", and "Homesick". Copperman had left the band to go to college in the Fall of 2008 but still appeared on the EP; the band dropped the keyboard and added Noah Bond as lead guitarist.

As of the fall of 2009, the Vox Jaguars are on indefinite hiatus.
