= Novelty (album) =

Studio album by Jawbox
- Released: May 1992
- Recorded: September 1991; January 1992
- Studios: OZ (Baltimore, Maryland); Inner Ear (Arlington, Virginia)
- Genre: Post-hardcore
- Length: 43:00
- Label: Dischord
- Producer: Iain Burgess

Jawbox chronology
Grippe (1991)	Novelty (1992)	For Your Own Special Sweetheart (1994)

Singles from Novelty
- 1. "Tongues"/"Ones and Zeros" Released: February 1992

Novelty is the second studio album by the American post-hardcore band Jawbox, released by Dischord Records in May 1992. The songs "Tongues" and "Ones and Zeros" were previously released as a single, and "Static" was featured on a split 7-inch with Tar. A video was produced for the track "Cutoff."

Novelty was the band's first album with guitar player Bill Barbot and last album with drummer Adam Wade.

== Critical reception ==
Professional ratings
Review scores
Source	Rating
AllMusic	3.5/5 stars
The Encyclopedia of Popular Music	3/5 stars
MusicHound Rock	4.5/5 stars
Punknews.org	5/5 stars

Trouser Press opined that "the mushy mix wastes the dual guitars, and [J] Robbins' vocals frequently seem dreary and monochromatic." The Washington Post wrote: "Punchy but hardly pop, such songs as 'Cutoff' and 'Static' possess both focus and bristling energy."

== Track listing ==
All tracks are written by Jawbox.

No.	Title	Length
1.	"Cutoff"	3:51
2.	"Tracking"	2:32
3.	"Dreamless"	4:08
4.	"Channel 3"	2:56
5.	"Spiral Fix"	4:52
6.	"Linkwork"	3:58
7.	"Chump"	2:25
8.	"Static"	4:07
9.	"Spit-Bite"	4:52
10.	"Send Down"	2:36
11.	"Tongues"	3:59
12.	"Ones and Zeros"	3:02

== Personnel ==
- J. Robbins – guitar, vocals
- Kim Coletta – bass
- Bill Barbot – guitar, background vocals
- Adam Wade – drums
