= The Dismemberment Plan =

American indie rock band

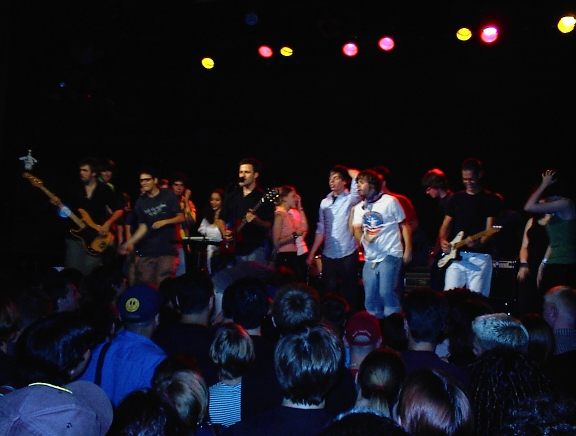
- The Dismemberment Plan at the Bowery Ballroom in New York City in 2003

Background information
- Origin: Washington, D.C., U.S.
- Genres: Indie rock; rock; emo
- Years active: 1993–2003; 2007; 2010–2015; 2023–present
- Labels: Partisan; MapleMusic; Interscope; DeSoto
- Members: Eric Axelson; Jason Caddell; Travis Morrison; Joe Easley
- Past members: Steve Cummings
- Website: dismembermentplan.com

The Dismemberment Plan is an American rock band formed in Washington, D.C. on January 1, 1993. Also known as D-Plan or the Plan, the name was derived from an industry phrase used by insurance salesman Ned Ryerson in the 1993 comedy film Groundhog Day. The band members include Eric Axelson (bass), Jason Caddell (guitar), Joe Easley (drums), and Travis Morrison (vocals and guitar). Axelson, Caddell, Morrison and original drummer Steve Cummings formed the band in college, knowing each other from attending northern Virginia high schools (Axelson, Cummings, and Morrison attended Lake Braddock Secondary School in Burke, Virginia). Cummings left the band after the recording of their debut album ! and was replaced by Easley, cementing the band's lineup.

The Dismemberment Plan released four albums before breaking up in 2003, the best known being 1999's critically acclaimed Emergency & I. They reunited three times after their initial disbandment for additional tour dates, and to produce their fifth studio album Uncanney Valley in 2013.

The band's influence has been observed in the music of Washington D.C. post-hardcore bands such as Q and Not U and Black Eyes.

== Band history ==
=== 1993–2003: Original years ===
Aside from a brief interlude in 1998 and 1999 when they were signed by Interscope Records, the band recorded for the Washington, D.C., independent label DeSoto Records. Their breakthrough album, Emergency & I, was actually created during their time at Interscope. However, they were dropped from the label shortly after its completion, and thus took it back with them to DeSoto, where it wound up being released. The EP The Ice of Boston is the only item of theirs Interscope actually released during their tenure there. The band managed to avoid being in debt to the label, effectively being able to record on a major label budget with no consequence. The band referred to their situation in a later interview as "slipping through the cracks".

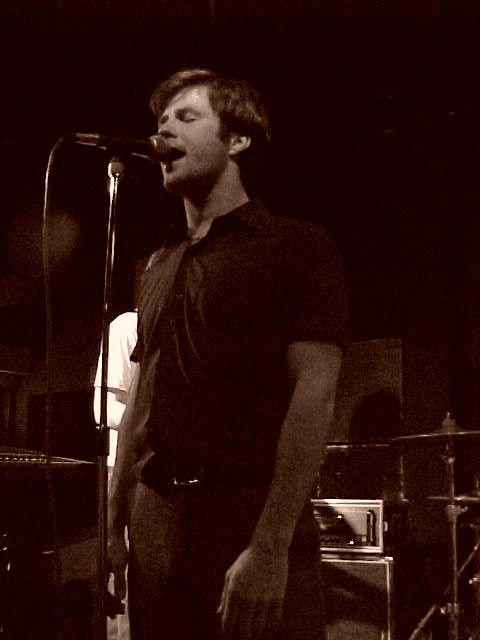
Travis Morrison performing with the Dismemberment Plan at the Iowa Union Basement c. 2001

Following the underground success of Emergency & I, the band received an even higher profile after being invited to open for the European leg of Pearl Jam's 2000 tour. A co-headlining tour in 2002 with Death Cab for Cutie (called the "Death and Dismemberment Tour") also worked well to raise both bands' profiles and cross-pollinate their fanbases, as well as forge creative ties between several members. Later that summer and fall, the Dismemberment Plan debuted songs for their follow-up to 2001's Change. In 2002, the band put all the music tracks from their last two albums on their website, encouraging fans to remix the songs. The result was 2003's A People's History of the Dismemberment Plan.

On January 19, 2003, however, the band announced their decision to break up after a few tours that year. A final show was planned for July 28, 2003, at the Washington D.C. outdoor venue, Fort Reno Park. However, come showtime, a heavy rain threatened to damage their electronic equipment on the uncovered stage and drove off all but the most devoted fans. This led the band to add one more concert for September 1, 2003 — dubbed the "one last slice" show — at a sold-out 9:30 Club in Washington, D.C. By the band's breakup, Emergency & I and Change had each sold 22,000 copies in the United States.

=== 2003–2010: Post-breakup activity ===
Morrison took the post-Change songs with him for further work, and released many of them on his first album, Travistan, released in 2004. Eric Axelson started a band called Maritime with former members of The Promise Ring. They released three albums: Glass Floor in 2004, We, the Vehicles in 2006, and Heresy and the Hotel Choir in 2007.

On March 1, 2007, the band announced they would be playing a one-off reunion show on Saturday, April 28, 2007 at Washington D.C.'s venerable Black Cat nightclub. The event was a charity concert benefiting Callum Robbins, son of J. Robbins, frontman for DeSoto Records labelmate Jawbox. Fan reaction to the decision was overwhelmingly positive, and tickets to the concert sold out within minutes of being offered online. In response to the high demand for tickets, a second show was announced for April 27. Travis Morrison has stated that the band probably won't be getting back together, "except to drink beer".

=== 2010–2015: First reunion and Uncanney Valley ===
On September 13, 2010, The Washington Post's Click Track reported that the band would reunite for a tour, in support of Barsuk Records' reissue of 1999's Emergency & I. "We're not planning a new record," bassist Eric Axelson told Click Track. "But we're doing these shows and taking it day to day after that." The 2011 tour kicked off with a performance on Late Night with Jimmy Fallon, followed by three Washington, D.C. shows (two at the 9:30 Club, one at the Black Cat) January 21–23. The band would play 10 more shows in 2011, including high-profile appearances at the Pitchfork Music Festival in Chicago and the annual "Roots Picnic" in Philadelphia.

In August 2012, wanting to play "a couple of small, sweaty summer shows like we used to do", the Dismemberment Plan played small-venue shows in Baltimore and Fredericksburg, Va where they debuted eight new songs. As of August 13, 2012, according to Travis Morrison, "We have a bunch more [new songs] coming so we're going back to the lab to work on brand new ones and tweak these. No plans for recording as of yet, although certainly those conversations are happening now." Shortly thereafter, the band announced that they would be playing the Virgin FreeFest in October, along with two more accompanying shows.

On July 16, 2013, the band shared "Waiting", the lead single from their forthcoming fifth album Uncanney Valley, which could initially be heard by calling the promotional phone number 252-64-DPLAN. Two more singles, "Invisible" and "Daddy Was a Real Good Dancer", were released on August 19 and September 11 respectively.

On October 15, 2013, the band released their fifth studio album Uncanney Valley on Partisan Records.

In November 2013, the band played the final holiday camp edition of the All Tomorrow's Parties festival in Camber Sands, England. Following a New Year's Eve concert in 2014 at the Brighton Music Hall in Boston, Massachusetts, the group went on hiatus, and no announcement was made by the band on its status.

=== Since 2023: Second reunion ===
On January 31, 2024, without prior announcement, The Dismemberment Plan contributed a cover of the Circus Lupus song "Unrequited" for Yesterday & Today: DC Does Dischord, a tribute album to Dischord Records. The song was reportedly recorded in August 2023. Later in the year, the band announced they would play six reunion shows starting in September, their first live performances in almost a decade, to celebrate the 25th anniversary of Emergency & I, concluding with performances at the Best Friends Forever festival in Las Vegas, and the United Sounds NYC festival in New York City.

== Musical style and influences ==
The Dismemberment Plan are described as an "emo-tinged" indie rock band by AllMusic. Their songwriting and sound have been described as "offbeat", drawing influence from R&B and dance music. Washington City Paper described the band's sound as "ecstatic, polyglot, genre-hopping indie rock." The publication also described the band's style as "fusion-oriented and inexplicable" as well as "a frantic, dance-friendly sound that was punk chiefly in attitude." BrooklynVegan considers the band's music to be "emo-adjacent". NPR and Pitchfork referred to the band's sound and style as simply rock.

== Discography ==
Studio albums

- "!" (1995)
- The Dismemberment Plan Is Terrified (1997)
- Emergency & I (1999)
- Change (2001)
- Uncanney Valley (2013)

Live album

- Live in Japan 2011 (2011)

EPs

- Can We Be Mature? (1994)
- The Ice of Boston (1998)
- Juno & the Dismemberment Plan (Split EP) (2000)

Compilations and appearances

- Give Me the Cure (1996)
- Ooh Do I Love You (1996)
- Fort Reno Benefit (1997)
- A People's History of the Dismemberment Plan (2003)
- Yesterday & Today: DC Does Dischord (2024)

Singles

- "What Do You Want Me to Say?" / "Since You Died" (1997)
- "Waiting" (2013)
- "Invisible" (2013)
- "Daddy Was a Real Good Dancer" (2013)
