= Grippe (album) =

Studio album by Jawbox
- Released: 1991
- Recorded: October 1990
- Studio: Inner Ear, Arlington, VA
- Genre: Post-hardcore
- Length: 44:01
- Label: Dischord
- Producer: J. Robbins, Eli Janney

Jawbox chronology
Jawbox 7" (1989)	Grippe (1991)	Novelty (1992)

Singles from Grippe
- 1. "Tools and Crome" Released: 1990

Grippe is the first album by the post-hardcore band Jawbox. It was released in 1991 on Dischord Records.

This is the only Jawbox album with the band as a trio, since second guitarist Bill Barbot would join the band shortly after the album's release for its touring cycle.

== Background ==
"Consolation Prize" appeared on a cassette-tape that had been floating around the hardcore scene albeit in demo form (this version was called simply "Consolation"). "Bullet Park" had also been previously released in demo form, but on a Maximumrocknroll compilation, in 1989. "Footbinder" appeared on a compilation for the indie label Simple Machines shortly before the album release. The last four tracks on the album had previously been released as a self-titled EP in 1990. The original vinyl and cassette copies of the album does not include the last five tracks.

== Reception ==
Professional ratings
Review scores
Source	Rating
AllMusic	3/5 stars
The Encyclopedia of Popular Music	3/5 stars
MusicHound Rock	3/5 stars

The Washington Post stated that "Jawbox marries folkie earnestness to hard-rock textures and rhythms... Grippe is more sound than songs."

According to AllMusic's Andy Kellman, the album was "essentially recorded after getting enough songs together to fill out a 12' chunk of vinyl"; he called it "an enjoyable, albeit introspectively brutal record." Kellman also described the music as the marriage of the "earlier crunchy side of Joy Division with Throb Throb-era Naked Raygun", while highlighting the cover of the Joy Division track "Something Must Break". Jim Testa, of Trouser Press, was more positive, writing that the record was "a rich, varied, polyrhythmic tour de force that still bears repeated listening."

== Track listing ==
All tracks are written by Jawbox, except where noted.

Side one
No.	Title	Length
1.	"Freezerburn"	3:39
2.	"Impossible Figure"	2:54
3.	"Tools and Chrome"	2:31
4.	"Paint Out the Light"	2:28
5.	"Consolation Prize"	3:29

Side two
No.	Title	Writer(s)	Length
6.	"Grip"		3:34
7.	"Ballast"		1:47
8.	"Something Must Break"	Ian Curtis, Peter Hook, Stephen Morris, Bernard Sumner	2:33
9.	"Green-Line Delayed"		3:33
10.	"Bullet Park"		2:40
11.	"Manatee Bound"		3:41

CD bonus tracks
No.	Title	Length
12.	"Footbinder" (from Simple Machines 7")	1:54
13.	"Tools and Chrome" (from Jawbox 7")	2:26
14.	"Secret History" (from Jawbox 7")	2:21
15.	"Ballast" (from Jawbox 7")	1:55
16.	"Twister" (from Jawbox 7")	2:32

== Personnel ==
- J. Robbins – vocals, guitar
- Kim Coletta – bass
- Adam Wade – drums
