= Anodyne Records =

American record label

- Founded: 1997
- Founder: John P. Hulston
- Defunct: 2010
- Genre: Punk, rock
- Country of origin: U.S.
- Location: Kansas City, Missouri
- Official website: www.anodynerecords.com

Anodyne Records was founded in 1997 in Kansas City by John Hulston, beginning with the live Making Love EP by Kansas City rock band Shiner. Over the years, there were albums from Onward Crispin Glover, Dirtnap, Overstep, The Hearers, and Open Hand.

Starting in 2005, Anodyne Records began growing; signing bands such as The Architects, Roman Numerals, The Valley Arena & the legendary Meat Puppets. In 2008, Anodyne Records began working on new releases from Open Hand, The BellRays, Sirhan Sirhan and The Vox Jaguars.

== Artists ==
- Meat Puppets
- Open Hand
- Dirtnap
- The Hearers
- Roman Numerals
- The String and Return
- Shiner
- Onward Crispin Glover
- The Vox Jaguars
- Architects
- Little Brazil

== See also ==
- List of record labels
