= Mission: Control! =

Studio album by Burning Airlines
- Released: 23 February 1999
- Recorded: 1998
- Genre: Post-hardcore
- Length: 42:50
- Label: DeSoto (U.S.); Arctic Rodeo Recordings (Germany)
- Producer: Burning Airlines, Peter Grey Mansinne, Chad Clark, Don Zientara

Burning Airlines chronology
Mission: Control! (1999)	Identikit (2001)

Professional ratings
Review scores
Source	Rating
AllMusic	4.5/5 stars

Mission: Control! is the debut album by American rock band Burning Airlines. It was released in 1999. The German label Arctic Rodeo Recordings reissued the album as a colored vinyl LP with enclosed CD in an edition of 700 copies (200 on yellow, 250 on blue, 250 on marbled orange/red) in 2012 with an extra song: "Back of Love".

== Track listing ==
All songs written by Burning Airlines, lyrics by J. Robbins.

1. "Carnival" – 2:30
2. "Wheaton Calling" – 3:12
3. "Pacific 231" – 3:20
4. "Scissoring" – 2:32
5. "The Escape Engine" – 2:54
6. "(my pornograph)" – 1:13
7. "Meccano" – 2:51
8. "3 Sisters" – 5:47
9. "Flood of Foreign Capital" – 3:44
10. "Crowned" – 2:43
11. "Sweet Deals on Surgery" – 2:39
12. "I Sold Myself In" – 9:26 (original CD release; actual song 2:50, followed by 4:55 of silence and a 1:41 untitled bonus song); 3:02 (2012 reissue)
13. "Untitled" - 1:43 (2012 reissue)
14. "Back of Love" - 3:12 (2012 reissue)

== Personnel ==
- J. Robbins – vocals, guitars, mini-moog, percussion, devices
- Bill Barbot – bass guitar, vocals, keyboards, guitar, percussion
- Peter Moffett – drums, vocals, percussion, guitar
