= Starless (album) =

Studio album by Shiner
- Released: April 18, 2000
- Recorded: 1999
- Genres: Post-hardcore, math rock
- Length: 43:48
- Labels: Owned & Operated
- Producer: Paul Malinowski

Shiner chronology
Lula Divinia (1997)	Starless (2000)	The Egg (2001)

Professional ratings
Review scores
Source	Rating
AllMusic	2.5/5 stars
Kerrang!	4/5 stars
Pitchfork	3.2/10

Starless is the third studio album by the American post-hardcore band Shiner. It was released in April 2000.

== Critical reception ==
Exclaim! wrote that "Shiner clean up their act by scrapping the lo-fi dirge and replacing it with a less cacophonous brand of guitar rock." The Dallas Observer wrote that "Starless ranked among [2000]'s top albums, showcasing pristine melodies, new drummer Jason Gerken's ticking-time-bomb percussion, subtle wind-chime guitars and deceptively intense vocals." The Coloradoan thought that "[Allen] Epley's songwriting and vocal skills ... are the high point of the release." The Kansas City Star opined that the album is "brighter, richer and more sonically complex and refined" than Lula Divinia.

== Track listing ==
All tracks are written by Allen Epley and Shiner.

No.	Title	Length
1.	"Spinning"	3:39
2.	"Giant's Chair"	3:42
3.	"Kevin Is Gone"	3:56
4.	"Unglued"	5:03
5.	"The Arrangement"	5:17
6.	"Glass Jaw Test"	2:58
7.	"Semper Fi"	3:19
8.	"Lazy Eye"	4:57
9.	"Rearranged"	2:35
10.	"Too Much of Not Enough"	5:51
11.	"Starless"	2:31
Total length:		43:48

== Personnel ==
- Allen Epley – vocals, guitar
- Paul Malinowski – bass guitar, backing vocals, production
- Jason Gerken – drums
- Josh Newton – guitar, keyboards, synthetics
- Andy Mueller – art direction, design, photography
