= For Your Own Special Sweetheart =

Studio album by Jawbox
- Released: February 8, 1994
- Recorded: August–September 1993
- Studio: OZ (Baltimore, Maryland)
- Genre: Post-hardcore
- Length: 41:42
- Label: Atlantic
- Producers: Ted Niceley, Jawbox

Jawbox chronology
Novelty (1992)	For Your Own Special Sweetheart (1994)	Jawbox (1996)

Singles from For Your Own Special Sweetheart
- 1. "Jackpot Plus!" Released: January 17, 1994; 2. "Savory" Released: 1994; 3. "Cooling Card" Released: 1994

For Your Own Special Sweetheart is the third album by Washington, D.C., post-hardcore band, Jawbox. It was produced by Ted Niceley, best known for his work with Fugazi. This would be the band's major label debut, as they had left Dischord Records to sign with Atlantic Records. It is also the first album to feature Zachary Barocas on drums, as he replaced original drummer Adam Wade two years prior. According to bassist Kim Coletta, For Your Own Special Sweetheart sold approximately 60,000 copies, which was viewed with disappointment by the label. The album was well received by critics.

"Savory" was the album's first single, followed by "Cooling Card". "Motorist" and "Jackpot Plus!" had previously been released on a Dischord single and were newly recorded for this album. The album was remastered and reissued by DeSoto in 2009 with three bonus tracks (b-sides from the "Savory" single) and new cover art.

== Writing and recording ==
Prior to their deal with Atlantic Records, Jawbox had wanted to record with producer Ted Niceley, being fans of his work with fellow Washington, D.C. band Fugazi. According to Kim Coletta, "[p]reviously, Ted had been out of our budget. He had a reputation for being very detail-oriented, but he was always professional and cordial. We knew [after the deal with Atlantic] we would have time and money to record."

According to drummer Zach Barocas, his parts on "Cooling Card", "Savory" and "Reel" were influenced by Manu Katché's drumming on Peter Gabriel's 1986 album So, stating that "these songs all feature variations on the 'In Your Eyes' beat."

The recording of For Your Own Special Sweetheart was the band's first time working with a click track, which necessitated more recording time than they were used to. According to singer-guitarist J. Robbins, Nicely was "extremely meticulous", and "in a very supportive way, really took us apart, and we had a real reckoning with all the things that we couldn't see about how we were performing and presenting our songs. It was a huge education in the mechanics of our playing and in the mechanics of putting a record together." While the band tried to record entire songs live, Robbins has stated that all guitar parts had to be re-recorded and "some of the songs were just tracked in sections", a process he describes as "very intense."

Robbins played his Mexican Fender Telecaster through a Hiwatt head on the album. According to Robbins, that amplifier head, which was "from the terrible era when Roland owned Hiwatt", was prone to malfunction, which resulted in a "ear-burningly scratchy and noisy" guitar sound. Singer-guitarist Bill Barbot played a Schecter guitar through a Marshall JCM800 amp, while Barocas played a Ludwig kit with Zildjian cymbals.

Atlantic Records tried to persuade the band to re-record Novelty track "Static" for the album, but Barocas refused. Since he joined after Novelty, he insisted that the release should be made up entirely of music written by the band's current line-up.

== Reception ==
Professional ratings
Review scores
Source	Rating
AllMusic	4.5/5 stars
The A.V. Club	A
Chicago Tribune	3.5/4 stars
Drowned in Sound	9/10
Entertainment Weekly	B+
Los Angeles Times	3/4 stars
NME	7/10
Pitchfork	9.3/10
Record Collector	4/5 stars
Spin	7/10

The album received very positive reviews upon release. Greg Kot called the album "the quartet's punchiest record yet, surpassing in blowtorch clarity the group's earlier releases on Fugazi's Dischord label." He praised Ted Niceley's production, writing that it "puts a vicious gleam on Jawbox's rhythm section, particularly Kim Coletta's power-tool bass." He concluded by calling it "music of intelligence and intensity, superbly recorded."

Retrospective reviews (published mostly upon the album's reissue) have been even more positive. Jason Heller called it "the group's crowning achievement" and "one of that decade's most lasting, magnificent discs." Andy Kellman called the album "their peak, a thrilling collision of vibrant guitar-generated noise and off-center melodic hooks over a rhythm section that swings as easily as it pummels." "Inside or outside its D.C. epicenter," he writes, "this is one of post-hardcore's most exceptional releases, second to whatever Fugazi album gives you the biggest charge." Matt LeMay wrote that the album "has aged exceedingly well [...] precisely because it did not pander to the aesthetic fads of its time-- mainstream or underground. Instead, Jawbox honed their sound, maximized the resources at their disposal, and made a record that hides behind no extraneous instruments, sounds, or ideologies." Treble's Jeff Terich wrote that "Sweetheart has the makings of being legendary, much like Pink Flag and Entertainment!" and described the record as "the quintessential post-hardcore album."

"Savory" was covered by Sacramento rock band Deftones with alternative rock group Far on Deftones' B-Sides and Rarities album.

=== Accolades ===
Publication	Accolade	Rank
Alternative Press	The 90 Greatest Albums of the '90s	38
Pitchfork	Top 100 Favorite Records of the 1990s (1999)	19
Pitchfork	Top 100 Favorite Records of the 1990s (2003)	70
LAS Magazine	90 Albums of the 90s	15
Magnet	Top 60 Albums 1993-2003	49

== Track listing ==
No.	Title	Length
1.	"FF=66"	2:41
2.	"Savory"	4:39
3.	"Breathe"	2:47
4.	"Motorist"	3:43
5.	"LS/MFT"	2:50
6.	"Cooling Card"	2:51
7.	"Green Glass"	3:26
8.	"Cruel Swing"	2:16
9.	"Jackpot Plus!"	2:34
10.	"Chicago Piano"	3:30
11.	"Reel"	3:39
12.	"U-Trau"	3:10/3:01
13.	"Whitney Walks"	3:57

2009 Reissue Bonus Tracks
No.	Title	Length
14.	"Lil' Shaver"	2:10
15.	"68"	3:17
16.	"Sound on Sound" (Big Boys cover)	4:06
Total length:		51:15

== Personnel ==
All personnel as per AllMusic.

Jawbox

- J. Robbins – vocals, electric guitar
- Bill Barbot – electric guitar, vocals
- Kim Coletta – bass guitar
- Zachary Barocas – "traps" (drums)

Production

- Ted Niceley – production, engineering, mixing
- Tim Gregory – engineering (assistant)
- Drew Mazurek – engineering
- Geoff Turner – engineering, mixing
- Jim Saah – photography
- Shawn Scallen – photography
- Katherine Davis – photography
- Jason Farrell – art direction, graphic design
