= Shiner (band) =

American rock band

- Origin: Kansas City, Missouri, United States
- Genres: Post-hardcore, alternative rock, math rock, space rock revival
- Years active: 1992–2003, 2012–present
- Labels: DeSoto, Hit It!, Sub Pop, Owned & Operated, Anodyne, Spartan
- Members: Allen Epley; Paul Malinowski; Jason Gerken; Josh Newton
- Past members: Jeff Brown; Tim Dow; Joel Hamilton; Shawn Sherrill

Shiner is an American post-hardcore/alternative rock band from Kansas City, Missouri that was initially active from 1992 to 2003, before reuniting in 2012. It is currently composed of guitarist/vocalist Allen Epley, bassist/backing vocalist Paul Malinowski, drummer Jason Gerken and guitarist Josh Newton.

== History ==
Shiner formed in 1992 under the name Orchid with an initial lineup consisting of Epley, drummer Jeff Brown and bassist Shawn Sherrill. Brown was replaced in 1993 by Tim Dow, and the band began touring with acts such as Sunny Day Real Estate, Chore, Jawbox, Season to Risk, The Jesus Lizard, and Girls Against Boys. 1993 saw the release of their debut single "Brooks" by DeSoto Records, with two more singles following before the release of their first LP, Splay (recorded at Steve Albini's Chicago studio) in 1995.

After the release of Splay, Sherrill was replaced by Paul Malinowski. With this new lineup, Shiner recorded their sophomore effort Lula Divinia at Chicago Recording Company in summer 1996. The album saw release in March 1997 on Hit It! Recordings. Following the release of Lula Divinia, Independent record label Sub Pop released a 7" single of the group's songs "Sleep it Off" and "Half Empty", and the band toured with Hum in 1998.

Dow departed in 1998, with his final performance with the band being on the song "Spinning" from a split single with The Farewell Bend. A replacement for Dow was found in drummer Jason Gerken (formerly of Molly McGuire), and after a brief stint with Joel Hamilton on guitar, Josh Newton joined the band. This lineup would go on to record Shiner's third full-length, Starless. Starless was released on a label run by members of Descendents, Owned and Operated, in 2000. Finally with a stable lineup, the band recorded their fourth LP, The Egg, at Matt Talbott's recording studio, Great Western Record Recorders in Tolono, IL with the assistance of J. Robbins and Jason Livermore in 2001. The Egg was released by DeSoto Records. Following more than a year of touring behind The Egg, Shiner broke up in 2003. Their story was by no means an unusual one; they simply ran their course, building up a cult fanbase in a decade of releasing music, and reaching the logical endpoint of that arc.

After announcing that the band was breaking up, Shiner scheduled a final performance. The final show was held at The Madrid Theater in Kansas City on January 25, 2003. Houston, Dirtnap, and Elevator Division opened. The Egg grew an audience over time, thanks to social media and file sharing services.

After years of inactivity, Shiner reunited in 2012. Following this initial reunion, they continued to play shows sporadically. Notably, a reunion with Dow took place in 2017 celebrating the 20th anniversary of Lula Divinia, which coincided with a vinyl reissue.

Their fifth full-length, Schadenfreude, was released May 8, 2020. The single "Life as a Mannequin" was released February 28, 2020. The subsequent tour was postponed due to COVID-19.

In 2024, Shiner's discography (with the exception of Schadenfreude) was reissued on vinyl by Spartan Records, marking the first vinyl reissues of The Egg since 2018, Lula Divinia since 2017, Starless since 2015 and Splay since 1996. Splay featured alternate album art along with a comprehensive remix and remaster by Malinowski. 2025 saw the announcement of a new album, BELIEVEYOUME, set to be released on September 26, 2025, on Spartan Records. This was followed by the release of lead single "Asleep in the Trunk" on July 23, 2025.

== Influences ==
Shiner's influences include The Jesus Lizard, Slint, Swervedriver, Melvins, Failure, and Chavez.

== Presence in pop culture ==
The song "Third Gear Scratch", from Lula Divinia, was included on the soundtrack of the video game Saints Row 2.

== Members ==
=== Current ===
- Allen Epley – guitar, vocals (1992–2003, 2012, 2015–present)
- Paul Malinowski – bass (1996–2003, 2012, 2015–present)
- Josh Newton – guitar (1999–2003, 2012, 2015–present)
- Jason Gerken – drums (1999–2003, 2012, 2015–present)

=== Previous members ===
- Jeff Brown – drums (1992)
- Tim Dow – drums (1993–1998)
- Joel Hamilton – guitar (1999)
- Shawn Sherrill – bass (1992–1996)

== Discography ==
=== Studio albums ===
Year	Album details
1996	Splay: Release date: January 1, 1996; Label: DeSoto Records
1997	Lula Divinia: Release date: March 11, 1997; Label: Hit It! Recordings
2000	Starless: Release date: April 18, 2000; Label: Owned & Operated
2001	The Egg: Release date: October 23, 2001; Label: DeSoto Records
2020	Schadenfreude: Release date: May 8, 2020; Label: Two Black Eyes
2025	BELIEVEYOUME: Release date: September 26, 2025; Label: Spartan

=== Singles and EPs ===
- "Brooks" / "Released" (1993, DeSoto)
- "Crush" / "Exhaust" (1994, Hit It!, split with Molly McGuire)
- "Floodwater" / "Cowboy" (1995, HitIt!)
- "Sleep it Off" / "Half Empty" (1997, Sub Pop)
- "Farewell Bend Merger" (1998, DeSoto)
- "Semper Fi" / "Sailor's Fate" (1999, DeSoto)
- "Making Love EP" (2000, Anodyne, reissued in 2007)
- "Life as a Mannequin" (2020, Two Black Eyes)
- ”Paul P Pogh” (2020, Two Black Eyes)
- "The One Thing" (2022)
- "Asleep in the Trunk" (2025, Spartan)

=== Compilations ===
- "Only Shallow" on the Soak Your Shoes in Red Wine and Strike the Angels Dumb compilation CD (2003, Grand Theft Autumn)
- "Anytime" (credited as Ohms) on the No Escape: A Tribute to Journey compilation CD-EP (2003, URININE)
