= Travistan =

Studio album by Travis Morrison
- Released: 30 September 2004
- Recorded: 2003–2004
- Genre: Indie rock
- Length: 42:12
- Label: Barsuk
- Producers: Chris Walla, Don Zientara

Travis Morrison chronology
| Travistan (2004) | All Y'All (2007) |

Travistan is the solo debut album by American musician Travis Morrison, the frontman of the band the Dismemberment Plan. It was released on September 30, 2004 by Barsuk Records, a year after the band's breakup.

== Reception ==
Professional ratings
Aggregate scores
| Source | Rating |
|---|---|
| Metacritic | 56/100 |
Review scores
| Source | Rating |
| AllMusic | 3.5/5 stars |
| Alternative Press | 4/5 stars |
| Blender | 3/5 stars |
| Cokemachineglow | 37% |
| Pitchfork | 0.0/10 |
| Spin | B |
| Stylus | B+ |
| Tiny Mix Tapes | 2/5 stars |
| The Village Voice | B+ |

Travistan received mixed reviews. It currently has a 56 out of 100 on the review aggregate site Metacritic, indicating "Mixed or average reviews."

The album is often noted in discussions of the music journalism website Pitchfork, as it marked one of the first moments when, after establishing itself as a critical powerhouse, the e-zine turned on an artist to whom it had previously given enthusiastic support. The album was one of the rare albums to get a 0.0 rating, with reviewer Chris Dahlen describing the album as "one of the most colossal trainwrecks in indie rock history." Barsuk Records co-founder Josh Rosenfeld described the effects of the review as "immediate and disastrous"; Pitchfork's managing editor later said that the site had become more careful in issuing very negative reviews as a result.

Responding to Pitchfork's review, Morrison said:

I just got the sense [Pitchfork] thought I was a rock star and they wanted to take me down a peg, but I don't think it occurred to them that the review could have a catastrophic effect... Up until the day of the review, I'd play a solo show, and people would be like, 'That's our boy, our eccentric boy.' Literally, the view changed overnight... I could tell people were trying to figure out if they were supposed to be there or not. It was pretty severe, how the mood changed. The review isn't the story. The reaction to it is. The seriousness with which everyone takes Pitchfork is kind of mind-boggling.

In 2018, Slate asked Morrison to discuss the review for an article about Pitchfork's ability to kill careers. He declined multiple times, only describing it as "a really frightening and awful experience" akin to "modern internet humiliation."

Other critical reviews compared the album negatively to work of Morrison's previous band The Dismemberment Plan. Zeth Lundy of PopMatters wrote, "This is quite literally as disappointing as records get, made all the more so by Morrison's solid resume with the Dismemberment Plan." Lundy singled out the tracks "Get Me Off This Coin", "My Two Front Teeth, Parts 2 and 3" and "Song for the Orca" for criticism.

Not all reviews were negative, though. Noel Murray of The A.V. Club wrote "Travistan is odd but oddly listenable, with a bright mood sparked by Morrison's spirit of discovery. It's one extended, refreshing 'Why not?'." Stylus Magazine's Anthony Miccio, in response to the album's criticism, wrote, "After hearing the crap people have said about this album I'm bummed that people are so quick to reject what doesn't fit their immediate logic. It's ironic that folks would get off on shredding an album that's about trying to be kind and honest at the same time."

== Track listing ==
| No. | Title | Length |
|---|---|---|
| 1. | "Get Me Off This Coin A" | 1:00 |
| 2. | "Change" | 2:25 |
| 3. | "Born in '72" | 3:13 |
| 4. | "My Two Front Teeth, Parts 2 and 3" | 5:18 |
| 5. | "Get Me Off This Coin B" | 0:45 |
| 6. | "People Die" | 4:22 |
| 7. | "Song for the Orca" | 3:12 |
| 8. | "Any Open Door" | 3:53 |
| 9. | "Get Me Off This Coin C" | 0:57 |
| 10. | "Che Guevara Poster" | 4:17 |
| 11. | "The Word Cop" | 2:50 |
| 12. | "Angry Angel" | 3:32 |
| 13. | "Get Me Off This Coin D" | 1:44 |
| 14. | "Represent" (hidden track) | 4:45 |

== Personnel ==
Credits adapted from AllMusic.

- Travis Morrison – bass guitar, drum machine, guitar, melodica, organ, percussion, piano, sampling, synthesizer, xylophone
- Phil Brazena – violin
- Dan Doggett – double bass
- Mike Dugan – bass guitar, drum machine, guitar, melodica, organ, percussion, piano, sampling, synthesizer, xylophone
- Amanda Fazzone – choir, chorus
- Megan Katcher – viola
- Josh LeBar – double bass
- Corinne Lynch – viola
- Jason McGerr – drums
- Kendall Nordin – choir, chorus
- Tiffany Shanta – violin
- Travistani National String Orchestra – strings
- Travistani Women's Chorus – choir, chorus
- Sean Urban – violin
- John Vanderslice – background vocals
- Christopher Walla – audio production, bass, drum machine, guitar, melodica, organ, percussion, piano, producer, sampling, synthesizer, xylophone
- Don Zientara – audio production, producer
