= Splay (Shiner album) =

Studio album by Shiner
- Released: Fall 1995
- Recorded: 1994
- Genres: Post-hardcore, math rock, indie rock
- Length: 41:33
- Label: DeSoto
- Producer: Bob Weston

Shiner chronology
Splay (1995)	Lula Divinia (1997)

Professional ratings
Review scores
Source	Rating
AllMusic	3/5 stars

Splay is the debut studio album by the rock band Shiner. It was released in 1996 on DeSoto Records.

== Track listing ==
- All songs written by Allen Epley, Shawn Sherill, and Tim Dow.
1. "HeShe" – 3:00
2. "Brooks" – 2:40
3. "Complaint" – 2:56
4. "Bended Knee" – 4:13
5. "Fetch a Switch" – 6:51
6. "Slipknot" – 3:15
7. "Martyr" – 4:06
8. "Released" – 5:08
9. "Frown" – 5:34
10. "Pearle" – 3:52

== Personnel ==
- Allen Epley – vocals, guitar
- Shawn Sherill – bass guitar
- Tim Dow – drums
- Bob Weston – production
- J. Robbins – design, graphics
