= Juno (band) =

American indie rock band

- Origin: Seattle, Washington, U.S.
- Genres: Indie rock, post-punk, post-hardcore, shoegaze, experimental
- Years active: 1995–2003, 2006
- Labels: Sub Pop, Jade Tree, DeSoto Records, Mag Wheel Records, Pacifico Records, Modern City Records, Face Hand Shy, BCore, Southern
- Members: Arlie Carstens; Gabe Carter; Jason Guyer; Greg Ferguson
- Past members: David Broecker; Nate Mendel; Travis Saunders; Nick Harmer; Steven Cobb; Eric Akre; Jason Lajeunesse

Juno was an American indie rock band formed in Seattle, Washington in 1995. They released two studio albums, disbanding in 2003.

== Career ==
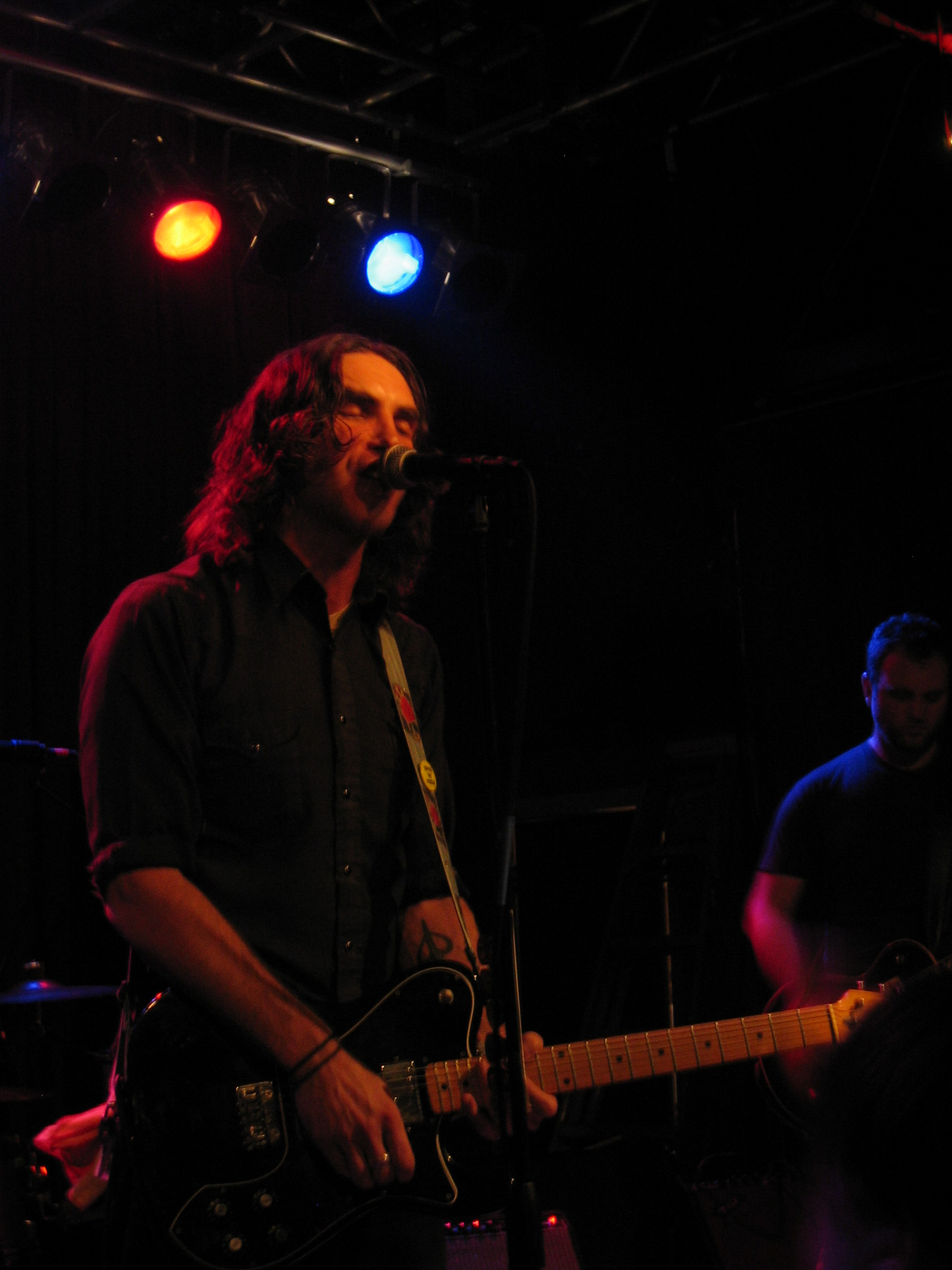
Juno's Arlie Carstens and Gabe Carter live at KEXP's Yule Benefit 2006

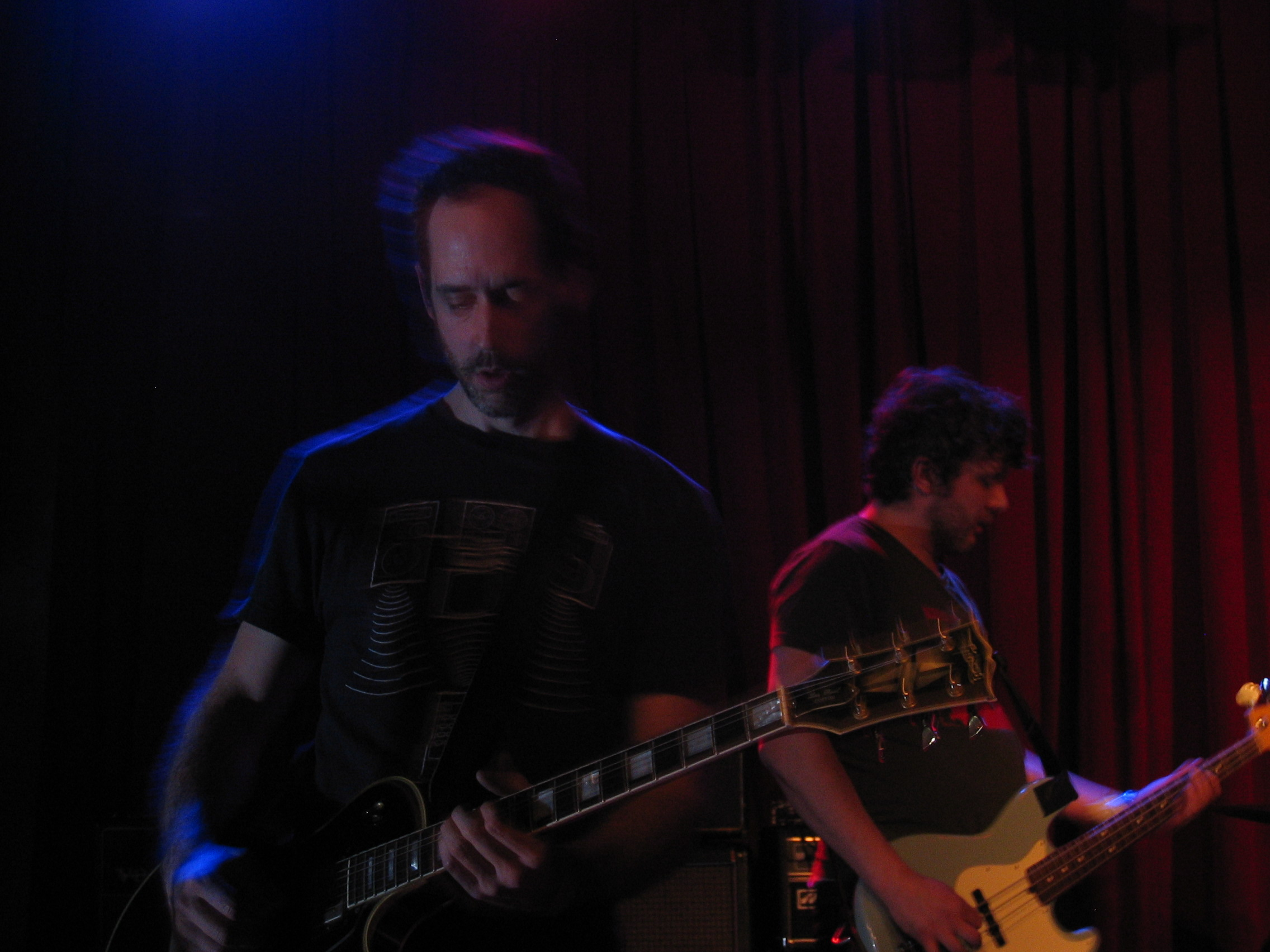
Juno's Jason Guyer (foreground) during Juno's concert at KEXP's Yule Benefit 2006

Juno released their debut album This Is the Way It Goes and Goes and Goes as a co-release on DeSoto Records and Pacifico Records on March 30, 1999. Their second album A Future Lived in Past Tense was released May 8, 2001, on Desoto Records.

The band toured throughout the US, Europe and Japan. They also released a split EP with The Dismemberment Plan on Desoto Records which included a cover of DJ Shadow's "High Noon". After DeSoto folded, Juno went on hiatus for several months.

The band is now officially defunct. Founding member Travis Saunders the bassist left the band in 2000. They had played with and auditioned a few different bassists (including Nate Mendel of Foo Fighters and Sunny Day Real Estate, and Nick Harmer of Death Cab for Cutie), but ultimately decided that they were going in different directions artistically.

After the band's breakup, some of its members formed Ghost Wars, a recording project led by Carstens and Eric Fisher.

Juno reunited to play two shows in Seattle on December 9 and 10 2006 for KEXP's annual Yule Benefit.

== Discography ==
=== Albums ===
- This Is the Way It Goes and Goes and Goes (1999, DeSoto Records)
- A Future Lived in Past Tense (2001, DeSoto Records)

=== Singles ===
- "Venus on Ninth" / "Flies for Travis" (1996, Sub Pop Records)
- "Magnified and Reduced by Inches" / "Pablo y Zelda" (1997, Jade Tree Records)
- "All Your Friends Are Comedians" / "The Great Salt Lake" (1998, Mag Wheel Records)
- Juno & The Dismemberment Plan (2000, DeSoto Records)
  - The Dismemberment Plan/Juno Split 7" (2000, BCore Disc) – Spanish release
