= A People's History of The Dismemberment Plan =

A People's History of the Dismemberment Plan

Remix album by The Dismemberment Plan
- Released: October 6, 2003
- Label: DeSoto Records

The Dismemberment Plan chronology
Change (2001)	A People's History of the Dismemberment Plan (2003)	Uncanney Valley (2013)

Professional ratings
Review scores
Source	Rating
Allmusic	4/5 stars
Pitchfork Media	(6.0/10)

A People's History of the Dismemberment Plan is a 2003 album by Washington D.C. indie band The Dismemberment Plan, issued on DeSoto Records. The album is a compilation of songs from three of the band's previous releases, The Dismemberment Plan Is Terrified, Emergency & I and Change, remixed by friends and fans as well as those simply interested in the project. The Dismemberment Plan made tracks available to the public via their website, giving the criteria of "use what you find, embellish, edit, and rematerialize as you see fit, and if we like it, we'll put it on the record" as the only guidelines for the project. After about a year the band sifted through the submitted remixes and selected 12 tracks for the final album. The album was released on October 6, 2003.

== Track listing ==
1. The Face of the Earth (remixed by parae)
2. What Do You Want Me to Say? (remixed by Drop Dynasty)
3. Academy Award (Cex)
4. Following Through (Cynyc)
5. The Other Side (Justin Norvell)
6. Life of Possibilities (Quruli)
7. Pay for the Piano (Grandmaster Incongruous)
8. Time Bomb (ASCDI)
9. Automatica (Deadverse)
10. The City (Ev)
11. The Jitters (Ender)
12. Superpowers (Erik Gundel)
