= All Y'all (album) =

All Y'All

Studio album by Travis Morrison Hellfighters
- Released: 21 August 2007
- Recorded: September 2006
- Genre: Indie rock
- Length: 41:49
- Label: Barsuk - BARK67
- Producer: Jason Caddell

Travis Morrison Hellfighters chronology
Travistan (2004)	All Y'All (2007)

Professional ratings
Review scores
Source	Rating
Allmusic	3.5/5 stars
Pitchfork Media	(4.5/10)
Dusted Magazine	favorable
Ohmpark	favorable
Punknews.org	4/5 stars
DCist	favorable
Treble Zine	favorable
Absolute Punk	favorable
Washington City Paper	favorable
The A.V. Club	A

All Y'All is Travis Morrison's second solo album, credited to the Travis Morrison Hellfighters. It was released on August 21, 2007, by Barsuk Records.

== Production ==
According to Travis Morrison:

The record was written mostly in early 2005, and then after some unsatisfactory attempts to record them, me and the Hellfighters stopped working on it. I started singing in church choirs, working for volunteer organizations here in DC, and did some travelling. We reconvened in Chicago in the fall of 2006 and recorded the songs with Jason Caddell, who was a bandmate of mine in the Dismemberment Plan, at the Chicago Recording Company. It was mixed by Jason and Joel Hamilton.

== Track listing ==
1. "I'm Not Supposed to Like You (But)" - 2:03
2. "As We Proceed" - 3:19
3. "Catch Up" - 4:35
4. "East Side of the River" - 3:25
5. "I Do" - 3:24
6. "Just Didn't Turn Me On" - 3:26
7. "You Make Me Feel Like a Freak" - 4:28
8. "Hawkins' Rock" - 3:56
9. "Churchgoer" - 4:02
10. "Book of Names" - 4:12
11. "Saturday Night" - 4:59

== Personnel ==
- The Hellfighters: Saadat Awan, David Brown, Brandon Kalber & Travis Morrison
- Ken Thomson: Saxophone on "You Make Me Feel Like A Freak", "I'm Not Supposed To Like You (But)" and "East Side of the River"
- Jean Cook: Violin on "East Side of the River"
- Art/Design: Jewboy Corporation
