= ! (The Dismemberment Plan album) =

Studio album by the Dismemberment Plan
- Released: October 2, 1995
- Genre: Post-hardcore
- Length: 38:07
- Label: DeSoto

The Dismemberment Plan chronology
! (1995)	The Dismemberment Plan Is Terrified (1997)

Professional ratings
Review scores
Source	Rating
AllMusic	3/5 stars
The Rolling Stone Album Guide	3/5 stars
Sputnikmusic	3.0/5
Tiny Mix Tapes	3.5/5

! is the debut studio album by American indie rock band the Dismemberment Plan. It was released on October 2, 1995, on DeSoto Records. The band's original drummer Steve Cummings played on the album but left shortly after its release.

== Track listing ==
1. "Survey Says" – 2:08
2. "The Things That Matter" – 2:25
3. "The Small Stuff" – 3:02
4. "OK Jokes Over" – 4:27
5. "Soon to Be Ex Quaker" – 1:26
6. "I'm Going to Buy You a Gun" – 3:06
7. "If I Don't Write" – 4:28
8. "Wouldn't You Like to Know?" – 2:50
9. "13th and Euclid" – 2:18
10. "Fantastic!" – 4:14
11. "Onward, Fat Girl" – 2:46
12. "Rusty" – 4:29
13. "The Dismemberment Plan Gets Rich" (Japanese bonus track) – 2:23

== Personnel ==
The following people were involved in the making of !:

The Dismemberment Plan

- Eric Axelson – bass
- Jason Caddell – guitar
- Steve Cummings – drums
- Travis Morrison – vocals, guitar

Production

- Andy Charneco and Don Zientara – recording
