= This Is the Way It Goes and Goes and Goes =

This Is the Way It Goes & Goes & Goes

Studio album by Juno
- Released: March 30, 1999
- Recorded: November 1998
- Genre: Indie rock
- Length: 53:50
- Label: DeSoto
- Producer: Kip Beelman

Juno chronology
This Is the Way It Goes & Goes & Goes (1999)	Juno & The Dismemberment Plan (2001)

Professional ratings
Review scores
Source	Rating
Allmusic	3/5 stars
PandoMag	5/5 stars
Pitchfork Media	(8.3/10)

This Is the Way It Goes & Goes & Goes is the debut album by Seattle band Juno, released in 1999 on DeSoto Records.

== Track listing ==
1. "The Great Salt Lake/Into the Lavender Crevices of Evening the Otters Have Been Pushed" - 5:31
2. "Rodeo Programmers" - 2:53
3. "The Young Influentials" - 4:00
4. "All Your Friends Are Comedians" - 3:27
5. "Leave a Clean Camp and a Dead Fire" - 9:51
6. "January Arms" - 8:33
7. "Venus on 9th Street" - 3:14
8. "A Listening Ear" - 7:19
9. "Are You Still There?" - 0:55
10. "The Sea Looked Like Lead" - 8:07
