= Hit It! Recordings =

American independent record label

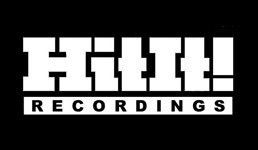
- Founded: 1994
- Founder: Ken Waagner
- Defunct: 1998
- Country of origin: United States
- Location: Chicago, Illinois

HitIt! Recordings was an independent record label established in 1994 by artist manager/record producer Ken Waagner as an in house label at the Chicago Recording Company.

In January 1994, the Kansas City-based rock band Molly McGuire signed with the label and recorded their debut album Sisters of… (HIT-02).

The label released a seven-inch single by Molly McGuire "heart" (HIT-001) and a split single between Molly McGuire and KC power trio Shiner "Crush" b/w "Exhaust" (HIT-003) prior to the release of Sisters of… in the summer of 1994.

From 1994-1997 HitIt! released a series of seven-inch singles by a number of Kansas City bands including Shiner, Boys Life/Giant's Chair and Iron Right Mangle - as well as two seven-inch singles by Chicago-based Triple Fast Action (HIT-06) and (HIT-08), a seven-inch from Alabama-based singer/songwriter Louis Schefano under the name Regia; the debut album from Scottish-born long-time Chicago resident Chris Connelly's quartet The Bells, the Sardina album, two albums by Butterfly Child onomatopoeia in 1994 and The Honeymoon Suite (HIT-14) and Global Communication's remix album Remotion from Dedicated.

In Spring of 1995 the band Sardina signed to Hit It! and released their debut album Presents which was released in the fall of 1995 and received critical acclaim both for its music as well as the band's creative take/homage to Led Zeppelin's album Presence with the cover art.

In the fall of 1995 Molly McGuire commenced work on their second album "Lime" which was released on HitIt!/Epic Records in 1996.

In the summer of 1996, Shiner recorded their second full-length album "Lula Divinia" (HIT-20) which was released in the spring of 1997 as the first release through a joint venture marketing and distribution deal with Tommy Boy Records and the Alternative Distribution Alliance (ADA).

In the fall of 1997 Hit It! released two albums by .O.Rang via license from Echo Records UK. 1994's "Herd of Instinct" (HIT-19) and "Fields and Waves" (HIT-21).

In 1997 Molly McGuire played 9 shows on the second stage of Lollapalooza in support their album Lime.

In the fall of 1997 Joe Cassidy/Butterfly Child signed to HitIt! and began work on his third studio album "Soft Explosives" after relocating to Chicago in 1995 after being brought to town to do press and play a couple of shows in 1995. Soft Explosives was released in the summer of 1998 and was the last official release by the label.

== Hit It! Recordings Discography ==
Cat. #	Artist	Title	Format	Release date	Release notes
HIT-01	Molly McGuire	Heart	7-inch	1994	
HIT-02	Molly McGuire	Sisters of…	CD	1994	
HIT-03	Molly McGure/Shiner	Crush b/w Exhaust	7-inch	1994	split single
HIT-04	Butterfly Child	onomatopoeia	CD	1995	
HIT-05	Sardina	Me and My Arrow	7-inch	1995	
HIT-06	Triple Fast Action	Revved Up	7-inch	1996	
HIT-07	Sardina	Presents		1996	
HIT-08	Triple Fast Action	Ronnie's Pants	7-inch	1996	
HIT-09	Boys Life/Giants Chair	split 7-inch		1996	split single
HIT-11	Molly McGuire/Iron Right Mangle				split single
HIT-12	Shiner	Floodwater b/w Cowboy	7 inch	1995	
HIT-13	Molly McGuire	Lime	CD/LP	1996	HitIt!/Epic Records
HIT-14	Butterfly Child	The Honeymoon Suite	CD	1996	license from Dedicated Records
HIT-15	Global Communication	Remotion	CD		license from Dedicated Records
HIT-16	Regia	Same Time, Same Place b/w Disinfectant	7 inch		
HIT-17	Molly McGuire	Plastic Pirates/Lost at Sea	7 inch		HitIt!/Epic
HIT-19	.O.Rang	Herd of Instinct	CD	1997	license from Echo Records
HIT-20	Shiner	Lula Divinia	CD	1997	HitIt!/DeSoto
HIT-21	.O. Rang	Fields and Waves	CD	1997	license from Echo Records
HIT-22	The Bells	The Ultimate Seaside Companion	CD	1997	
HIT-23	.O.Rang	P53/10^{18} Remixes	12 inch		
HIT-24	Butterfly Child	Soft Explosives	CD	1998	
