= Burning Airlines =

American rock band

- Origin: Washington, D.C., U.S.
- Genres: Post-punk; punk rock; post-hardcore; alternative rock; emo
- Years active: 1997–2002
- Label: DeSoto
- Past members: J. Robbins; Bill Barbot; Peter Moffett; Mike Harbin; Benjamin Pape

Burning Airlines was an American rock band from Washington, D.C., formed in 1997. J. Robbins and Bill Barbot of Jawbox formed the band with Peter Moffett (formerly of Government Issue and Wool). The band released two full-length albums, a self-titled 7", and split releases with At the Drive-In and Braid. Burning Airlines abruptly disbanded in 2002.

== History ==
Robbins and Barbot had jammed with Moffett while their band Jawbox was still active, briefly considering him to fill in after drummer Zach Barocas' departure. Moffett had previously played in Government Issue alongside Robbins in the 1980s. However, the lineup of Robbins, Barbot, Moffett, and bassist Kim Coletta did not last, and Jawbox disbanded shortly after. Robbins, Barbot, and Moffett reconvened under the name Burning Airlines. The band's name was taken from a Brian Eno song, "Burning Airlines Give You So Much More", from his 1974 album Taking Tiger Mountain (By Strategy). Burning Airlines released their first 7" in 1998, and their debut album Mission: Control! was released in 1999 on DeSoto Records.

As Barbot was unwilling to tour as extensively as the rest of the band wanted, Barbot quit and was replaced by longtime friend and Jawbox roadie Mike Harbin (also formerly of Jack Potential and Admiral). This lineup toured extensively and recorded a second album, Identikit. It was released on DeSoto Records in 2001. Benjamin Pape (formerly of The Four Horsemen) was added as second guitarist and keyboardist.

Burning Airlines was in the middle of a major North American tour when the September 11, 2001 attacks occurred. As a result, many clubs refused to display the band's name prominently. The band considered changing their name but decided the name was still appropriate and had taken a new meaning and relevancy. The band then abruptly split up in 2002.

== Members ==
- J. Robbins – vocals, guitars, programming (1997–2002)
- Peter Moffett – drums, percussion, guitars (1997–2002)
- Bill Barbot – bass, keyboards, vocals (1997–1999)
- Mike Harbin – bass, programming (1999–2002)
- Benjamin Pape – guitars, keyboards (2001–2002)

== Discography ==
=== Albums ===
- Mission: Control! (DeSoto Records, 1999)
- Identikit (DeSoto Records, 2001)

=== Singles ===
- "Carnival/Scissoring" (Desoto Records, 1998)
- "Back of Love", split with Braid (DeSoto Records, 1999)
- "The Deluxe War Baby", split with At the Drive-In (Thick Records, 2000)
