= Change (The Dismemberment Plan album) =

Studio album by The Dismemberment Plan
- Released: October 23, 2001
- Recorded: 2001
- Studio: Inner Ear Studios
- Genres: Indie rock; post-rock; neo-psychedelia; post-punk revival; math rock
- Length: 47:12
- Label: DeSoto Records
- Producers: Chad Clark, J. Robbins

The Dismemberment Plan chronology
| Juno & The Dismemberment Plan (2001) | Change (2001) | A People's History of The Dismemberment Plan (2003) |

Change is the fourth studio album by The Dismemberment Plan. It was released on October 23, 2001 on DeSoto Records. It was recorded by J. Robbins at Inner Ear Studios in Arlington, Virginia and it was mixed by Chad Clark.

== Background ==
The Dismemberment Plan opted to record Change with J. Robbins, who produced their previous album Emergency & I . Frontman Travis Morrison has said that this was because "[Robbins] doesn't let up, and he has a really pure enthusiasm for music and the record-making process. Look at the singers he's worked with: I, Bob Nanna of Braid, and Davey vonBohlen (sic) of the Promise Ring (to name just three) were all immeasurably better after working with him. He just gets the best out of people, in a really humane way."

"Sentimental Man" and "Ellen and Ben" were the last songs written, being finished right as the band was about to go into the studio. Morrison has stated that "Ellen and Ben" was specifically written as an album closer, while "Sentimental Man" was reworked to serve as the opener because no other song fit as the opening track.

== Influences ==
Morrison cited Joni Mitchell, Steely Dan, and Radiohead's Kid A and D'Angelo's Voodoo records as influences on Change. Noting the influence that Voodoo had on the band, Morrison said:

I think to a certain extent, we had a weird [desire to do] something like what [D'Angelo] did structurally. There's not that many choruses on Voodoo. Sometimes there are some blank spots, sometimes the hook is the groove, sometimes there are non-repeating patterns. I think we wanted to open up our structures, and I think we got that from Voodoo. We weren't gonna make an R&B record, but I think Voodoo had that formal influence on us.

According to Morrison, "Pay for the Piano", "quotes melodically" the Sting song "Fortress Around Your Heart". Morrison has stated that the song's lyrics are about "emotional sacrifice" and came about from observing the thankless work done by activists in Washington, D.C.. Morrison has described "Come Home" as "my Carole King" and stated that the opening lines of the song are a nod to King's "It's Too Late".

The band's then-recent tour with Pearl Jam had a significant influence on the music. According to Morrison, the band "soaked up a lot having been on that tour, watching [Pearl Jam] night after night. Certain songs, heavier songs like "Time Bomb" and "Secret Curse", I can hear the Pearl Jam element. We were never hard rock. We would make hard rock moves, but on that record there’s actually like big, monster rock 'n' roll, and that was, I think, a result of having been [on tour with Pearl Jam]." Morrison noted that he wrote "Secret Curse" because he wanted the band to have a song like Pearl Jam's "Wishlist".

According to Morrison, the main guitar line in "Following Through" was influenced by Blonde Redhead's 2000 album Melody of Certain Damaged Lemons.

Morrison has noted that compared to Emergency and I, Change is "a little more gothy, a little darker," and deals with "existential themes." Morrison has also called it his "night album," saying in an interview with Stylus Magazine:

[...] I think late-night records tend to [...] have much more carefully modulated dynamics, they tend, whatever the dynamics are they're not trying to beat you over the head with a point. They're trying to provide a space you can kind of enter and roam around a little bit. And, uh, yeah, that's what I think of when I think of late-night records. Like Court and Spark by Joni Mitchell, or any Portishead, or Kid A [...] Or Remain In Light by Talking Heads [...] you can either completely envelop yourself in it, or you can let it kind of burble away in the corner and do your thing—uh, usually I kind of opt for the former, 'cause they're so compelling. But they're challenging records to make, 'cause they may just bore everybody, it's quite possible.

== Reception and legacy ==
Professional ratings
Aggregate scores
| Source | Rating |
|---|---|
| Metacritic | 83/100 |
Review scores
| Source | Rating |
| AllMusic | 4.5/5 stars |
| Alternative Press | 8/10 |
| The Boston Phoenix | 3/4 stars |
| Consequence | A− |
| Entertainment Weekly | B+ |
| NME | 8/10 |
| Paste | 9.0/10 |
| Pitchfork | 8.6/10 |
| The Rolling Stone Album Guide | 4/5 stars |
| Stylus Magazine | 8.8/10 |

Change was met with universal critical acclaim. On the review aggregation website Metacritic, the album has an 83 out of 100 based on ten reviews, indicating "universal acclaim". Nick Southall of Stylus Magazine called the album more focused than Emergency & I, writing, "With Change, however, The Dismemberment Plan feel little need to show off with self-conscious musical ostentation and excess, instead choosing to focus themselves on making a fantastic, understated and involving record." Pitchfork's founder Ryan Schreiber praised the album's more sentimental sound, writing, "But metamorphosis can be a beautiful thing, and like the butterfly retains a part of the caterpillar, Change retains a part of the pre-mutated Dismemberment Plan. You see, they're still the same band they always were. They're just prettier now." Ted Alvarez of AllMusic also commended the album's new sound, writing, "It's difficult to chart the Dismemberment Plan's next move; their boundless creativity is their only fence. They could turn down an entirely new musical path, or they could always revisit their equally brilliant old territory. Either way, listeners are in for an original musical experience."

Michael O'Brien of PopMatters, on the other hand, was less positive about the album's new sound, writing, "For anyone who loved Emergency & I, or any of The Dismemberment Plan's other two records, Change sounds like The Dismemberment Plan on Quaaludes." O'Brien also called the album "an enjoyable record, a necessary record in the evolution of the band, but far from an essential listen." Robert Christgau of The Village Voice gave the album a three-star honorable mention rating, indicating "an enjoyable effort consumers attuned to its overriding aesthetic or individual vision may well treasure."

Change was named the 14th best album of 2001 by Pitchfork. The same website also placed the album at number 97 on its list of the top 200 albums of the 2000s.

Although not released as a single, a music video for "Time Bomb" was released in 2001 and was included the following year in the first Xbox Exhibition demo disk, part of a series released by Microsoft to promote upcoming Xbox titles and featuring music from independent acts.

== Track listing ==
All music is composed by Travis Morrison, Jason Caddell, Eric Axelson and Joe Easley.

| No. | Title | Length |
|---|---|---|
| 1. | "Sentimental Man" | 4:16 |
| 2. | "The Face of the Earth" | 4:46 |
| 3. | "Superpowers" | 4:48 |
| 4. | "Pay for the Piano" | 3:23 |
| 5. | "Come Home" | 5:05 |
| 6. | "Secret Curse" | 2:50 |
| 7. | "Automatic" | 4:16 |
| 8. | "Following Through" | 4:38 |
| 9. | "Time Bomb" | 4:24 |
| 10. | "The Other Side" | 3:45 |
| 11. | "Ellen and Ben" | 5:01 |

Japanese edition
| No. | Title | Length |
|---|---|---|
| 12. | "B.T.A." (mislabeled as "BTW") |
| 13. | "Academy Award" (Cex Remix) |

Australian edition
| No. | Title | Length |
|---|---|---|
| 12. | "What Do You Want Me to Say?" | 4:18 |
| 13. | "B.T.A." | 0:57 |
| 14. | "Crush" (mislabeled as "The Dismemberment Plan Gets Rich") | 6:15 |

== Personnel ==
The following people contributed to Change

=== The Dismemberment Plan ===
- Eric Axelson – bass, keyboards
- Jason Caddell – guitar, keyboards
- Joe Easley – drums
- Travis Morrison – vocals, guitar, keyboards

=== Additional personnel ===
- Bill Barbot - Label Design
- Chad Clark - Mixing
- Kim Coletta - Label Design
- J. Robbins - Engineer

== See also ==
- List of works in irregular time signatures
