= DeSoto Records =

American record label

- Founded: 1989
- Founder: Bill Barbot and Kim Coletta
- Genre: Punk rock, post-hardcore, indie rock, emo, rock
- Country of origin: United States
- Location: Washington, D.C.
- Official website: desotorecords.com

DeSoto Records is an American record label based in Washington, D.C.

== History ==
DeSoto was founded in 1989 and is run by husband and wife team Bill Barbot and Kim Coletta (both formerly of the band Jawbox). It was first founded by members of the band Edsel to release their first single: "My Manacles." Jawbox was next to use the name DeSoto for their first EP. DeSoto has released over 40 records, 7" singles, CDs, and LP vinyl records. It is distributed by Fontana Distribution.

The label decided in 2002 to stop releasing new music and focus instead on its catalog. They partnered with Dischord Records to re-release some of Jawbox's records.

== Discography ==
- The Dismemberment Plan – ! (1995)
- Shiner - Splay (1996)
- The Dismemberment Plan – The Dismemberment Plan Is Terrified (1997)
- Burning Airlines – Mission: Control! (1999)
- The Dismemberment Plan - Emergency & I (1999)
- Juno – This Is the Way It Goes and Goes and Goes (1999)
- Burning Airlines – Identikit (2001)
- The Dismemberment Plan – Change (2001)
- Juno – A Future Lived in Past Tense (2001)
- Shiner – The Egg (2001)
- The Dismemberment Plan – A People's History of the Dismemberment Plan (2003)
- Maritime – Glass Floor (2004)
- Doris Henson – Give Me All Your Money (2005)
- The Life and Times – Suburban Hymns (2005)
- Jawbox – For Your Own Special Sweetheart (2006, reissue of 1994 album)
- Jawbox – Jawbox (2006, reissue of 1996 album)

== See also ==
- List of record labels
