= Jawbox =

American post-hardcore band

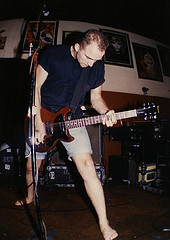
- Frontman J. Robbins in 1991

Background information
- Origin: Washington, D.C., U.S.
- Genre: Post-hardcore
- Years active: 1989–1997, 2009, 2019–2025
- Labels: Dischord, Atlantic, TAG, DeSoto
- Past members: J. Robbins; Kim Coletta; Zach Barocas; Brooks Harlan; Adam Wade; Bill Barbot
- Website: desotorecords.com

Jawbox was an American post-hardcore band from Washington, D.C., formed in 1989. The original lineup consisted of J. Robbins (vocals/guitar), Kim Coletta (bass), and Adam Wade (drums). Jawbox released their first two full-lengths Grippe (1991) and Novelty (1992) on the local independent label Dischord Records, eventually becoming the third best-selling band on the label, behind Minor Threat and Fugazi. Bill Barbot joined the band as an additional guitarist and vocalist after the release of Grippe, and Zach Barocas replaced Wade on drums after the release of Novelty.

Jawbox signed to the major label Atlantic Records and released their third album For Your Own Special Sweetheart in 1994, which spawned the band's most recognizable song "Savory". After the release of their fourth album Jawbox in 1996, the band departed from Atlantic, and subsequently disbanded in 1997. They reunited for a brief one-off show in 2009, followed by a full-time reunion in 2019. Barbot left the band in 2021 and he was replaced by Brooks Harlan, although in 2025 the band disbanded again.

== History ==
=== Formation, Grippe, and Novelty (1989–1992) ===
From 1986 to 1989, J. Robbins played in the final incarnation of Government Issue, the longest lived of the early Washington, D.C. hardcore punk bands. After Government Issue disbanded, Robbins formed Jawbox with bassist Kim Coletta and drummer Adam Wade. At the time, Robbins and Coletta were in a relationship, and Wade was a friend of Robbins that had recently returned home from college. The band's name was found while they were reading Brewer's Dictionary of Phrase and Fable, in which they saw that "a jawbox is a sink or sewer, and slang for television."

Jawbox's first concert was alongside Shudder to Think and Fugazi in September 1989. Jawbox's first compilation appearance was with the song "Bullet Park", which was included on Maximumrocknroll magazine's 1989 compilation album, They Don't Get Paid, They Don't Get Laid, But Boy Do They Work Hard!. The trio released a self-titled demo EP in late 1989 on their own, followed by a reissue on Slamdek Records. In early 1990, they released the single "Tools & Chrome". The single was their first use of the name DeSoto Records. DeSoto was an independent record label that was initially created by the band Edsel, and after Edsel distanced themselves from the business aspects, Jawbox took control of it which later grew in size. "Tools & Chrome" was also distributed by the independent punk rock label Dischord Records, although the band continued to utilize their own label DeSoto for various distribution purposes.

In 1991, the band released their full-length debut album Grippe, which was also issued by Dischord. Grippe featured both newly written material and re-recordings of older tracks. Around the same time as Grippe's release, Wade's friend and roommate Bill Barbot joined the band as an additional guitarist and singer. Jawbox supported the album by playing shows alongside bands such as Superchunk, Corrosion of Conformity, Fuel, and others. The band went on their first major tour alongside Helmet during the second half of 1991 as Helmet was touring behind their debut album as well, Strap It On. Around the same time, Jawbox released a split single with the band Jawbreaker for the independent label Selfless Records, and it was Barbot's first appearance in the studio with Jawbox.

The "Tongues" single was released in early 1992, and shortly after, the band released their second album Novelty, again on Dischord. The album spawned the band's first music video, "Cutoff". To support Novelty, Jawbox went on tour with Shudder to Think again. Prior to and during the tour, Wade became frustrated with the band's internal struggles, such as Coletta and Robbins ending their relationship, in the aftermath of which Coletta and Barbot started a romantic relationship, followed by Robbins' subsequent erratic behavior. Immediately after the tour ended, Wade departed from Jawbox and quickly joined Shudder to Think as their drummer.

Wade was replaced by drummer Zach Barocas, a friend of the band who conveniently had been living in the band's home building already. Barocas' unique drumming style became central to the band's signature sound, and his joining also prompted the band to work more collectively as a whole.

=== Signing to Atlantic, For Your Own Special Sweetheart, and Jawbox (1993–1996) ===
Jawbox then made a series of compilation appearances and released various one-off singles, including a split single with the band Tar in 1993, in which Tar covered the Jawbox song "Static" and Jawbox covered the Tar song also titled "Static".

Various major labels including Epic Records, Mercury Records, and Atlantic Records began to court the band. Barocas has said that the major label interest kept the band from breaking up, as he had quit Jawbox and applied to the University of Maryland, but changed his mind and informed them that he would rejoin the band provided they signed to a major. Jawbox began contemplating signing to Atlantic. Wary of potentially "selling out" by making a deal with a major label, the band wrote up what Robbins described as a "'list of impossible demands': to be self-managed, to have complete creative control, to release on vinyl on [DeSoto]," as well as control over the recording budget, merchandising rights, and licensing rights in Europe. To the surprise of the band, Atlantic agreed to the terms. According to Robbins, Jawbox forewent a large advance and tour support, asking Atlantic for just enough money to "pay for studio costs and cover some old bills."

Jawbox released their third album For Your Own Special Sweetheart in early 1994. The album peaked at #28 on the Billboard Heatseekers Chart and it sold roughly 50,000 copies overall. The first single released was "Savory", which became one of the band's most recognizable songs. It was aired regularly on MTV's 120 Minutes program and also appeared in an episode of Beavis and Butt-Head. The band made an in-studio appearance at 120 Minutes for a televised segment and they also made an appearance on an episode of Late Night With Conan O'Brien, playing "Savory" in both instances. They also recorded a radio session for John Peel, typically known as Peel Sessions. A second single and music video, "Cooling Card", was issued as well, but received minimal attention overall. Throughout 1994, the band toured as the openers for Atlantic labelmates Stone Temple Pilots to support For Your Own Special Sweetheart.

In 1995, Jawbox released a split live album with Leatherface on the German independent label Your Choice Records, titled as Your Choice Live Series. The following year, Atlantic moved Jawbox to TAG Recordings, a new subsidiary label imprint that Atlantic created to house its alternative rock artists. The band then began recording sessions with producer John Agnello for their 1996 album Jawbox (not to be confused with their earlier self-titled releases of the same name on Dischord and Slamdek). "Mirrorful" was the first single and video to be released, and the video premiered on 120 Minutes. A cover of the Tori Amos song "Cornflake Girl" was included as a hidden track on Jawbox and was subsequently issued as a promotional single. The band was also the first act to play at the 1996 version of the large HFStival. They then toured throughout 1996 and played alongside bands such as Nada Surf and Rocket From the Crypt. Although the Jawbox album was viewed favorably, minimal estimations of the album's sales lingered around 40,000 total and the TAG imprint also folded shortly afterwards. In early 1997 Jawbox and Atlantic/TAG mutually agreed to part ways.

=== Disbandment, other projects, and brief reformation (1997–2018) ===
Barocas then moved to New York City to attend film school at Hunter College. Drummer Peter Moffett (previously from Government Issue and Wool) was brought in as his replacement and the band had started to plan a tour of Europe; however, the tour plans were scrapped and Jawbox formally disbanded later in 1997. Jawbox officially released the compilation My Scrapbook of Fatal Accidents in 1998 on the DeSoto label, which consisted of b-sides, outtakes, songs recorded for the 1994 Peel Sessions, live tracks, and cover songs.

After the band's split, Barbot and Coletta married later on in 1997. Robbins and Barbot also formed the band Burning Airlines with Moffett. Burning Airlines released two albums, in 1999 and 2001. During their tour in 2001, the 9/11 attacks happened in the midst of their tour, and as such, many promoters and venues refused to display the band's name. Burning Airlines later abruptly broke up in 2002. In 1998, Barocas formed The Up on In which, like Burning Airlines, broke up quickly thereafter. He later joined the band Bells≥ and had started to publish the online literary journal The Cultural Society. Barbot also became the owner of Threespot, a Washington, D.C. web agency. Coletta gave birth to a son in 2001, although Barbot and Coletta later divorced shortly after 2009. Coletta also continued to run DeSoto on a more permanent basis, and later became a substitute teacher in Bethesda, MD. Although Wade initially left Shudder to Think in 1996, he later rejoined them in 2008, remaining in the band until 2013. Wade was also involved with numerous other bands such as Sweet 75, The Jealous Sound, Film School, among others. Robbins became a producer with extensive credits to his name, working with artists such as Texas Is the Reason, Jets to Brazil, Shiner, Against Me!, Clutch, and many more.

On October 7, 2009, Jawbox announced that the band would reform for a one-off performance on the December 8, 2009 episode of Late Night With Jimmy Fallon. The performance was meant to mark the reissue of their 1994 album For Your Own Special Sweetheart and was their first show since 1997. The broadcast saw the band performing the song "Savory", with additional footage posted online of the band performing "68" and "FF=66". Robbins stated that the band would not play any concerts at that time outside of the Late Night appearance, thus putting to rest rumors of a full-fledged reunion.

=== Reunion, lineup change, and hiatus (2019–present) ===
In January 2019, the band announced their official reunion with a 12 date summer tour. It was followed up by various other tours and shows. In August 2021, Jawbox announced that Barbot was leaving the band, citing the long commute from Barbot's new home in Vermont. He was replaced by Brooks Harlan, the guitarist and co-founder of the band War on Women and a long-time musical collaborator of Robbins.

On July 8, 2022, Jawbox released The Revisionist EP, which consisted of two Grippe re-recordings ("Grip" and "Consolation Prize") plus a Wire cover ("Lowdown"). The Revisionist EP marked the band's first new studio material in 26 years along with the first appearance of Harlan as a member.

In April 2025, Robbins confirmed the band had once again disbanded for the foreseeable future.

== Musical style, influences and legacy ==
Jawbox's music has been described as post-hardcore, and post-punk. The band have cited various bands and artists as influences, including Big Black, Naked Raygun, Fugazi, Helmet, Sonic Youth, Edsel, and Peter Gabriel.

Jawbox has had an outsized impact on underground music, influencing such bands as Motion City Soundtrack, Jim Ward of At the Drive-In and Sparta, Braid, the Jazz June, Lemuria, and Pilot to Gunner.

== Members ==
- J. Robbins – lead vocals, guitars, organ (1989–1997, 2009, 2019–2025)
- Kim Coletta – bass, backing vocals (1989–1997, 2009, 2019–2025)
- Zach Barocas – drums, percussion (1992–1997, 2009, 2019–2025)
- Brooks Harlan – guitars, backing vocals (2021–2025)
- Adam Wade – drums, percussion (1989–1992)
- Bill Barbot – guitars, organ, saxophone, backing vocals (1991–1997, 2009, 2019–2021)

Timeline

== Discography ==
=== Studio albums ===
List of studio albums
Title	Album details
Grippe	Released: April 1, 1991; Label: Dischord; Format: CD, LP, CS, DL
Novelty	Released: May 1, 1992; Label: Dischord; Format: CD, LP, CS, DL
For Your Own Special Sweetheart	Released: February 8, 1994; Label: Atlantic, DeSoto (re-release); Format: CD, LP, CS, DL
Jawbox	Released: July 2, 1996; Label: TAG/Atlantic, DeSoto (re-release); Format: CD, LP, CS, DL

=== Extended plays ===
List of extended plays
Title	EP details
Jawbox	Released: 1989; Label: Self-released (original), Slamdek (re-release); Format: CS
The Revisionist EP	Released: July 8, 2022; Label: Self-released; Format: LP, DL

=== Singles ===
Year	Song	Album
1990	"Tools & Chrome"	Grippe
1991	"Air Waves Dreams" (split w/ Jawbreaker)	Non-album single
1992	"Tongues"/"Ones and Zeroes"	Novelty
1993	"Falk" (split w/ Crackerbash)	Non-album single
1993	"Static" (split w/ Tar)	Non-album single
1993	"Motorist"/"Jackpot Plus!"	For Your Own Special Sweetheart
1994	"Savory"	For Your Own Special Sweetheart
1994	"Cooling Card"	For Your Own Special Sweetheart
1995	"Absenter"	Jawbox
1996	"Mirrorful"	Jawbox
1996	"His Only Trade"	Jawbox
1996	"Cornflake Girl" (Tori Amos cover)	Jawbox

=== Compilations ===
- Your Choice Live Series – Your Choice Records (1995); (live LP split w/ Leatherface)
- My Scrapbook of Fatal Accidents – DeSoto Records (1998)

=== Other appearances ===
- They Don't Get Paid, They Don't Get Laid, But Boy Do They Work Hard! – Maximumrocknroll (1989); "Bullet Park"
- Surprise Your Pig: A Tribute to R.E.M. – Staple Gun Records (1992); "Low"
- Chairman of the Board: Interpretations of Songs Made Famous by Frank Sinatra – Grass Records (1993); "I've Got You Under My Skin"
- The Machines: 1990–1993 – Simple Machines Records (1994); "Footbinder"
- Jabberjaw No. 2 – Mammoth Records (1994); "Chump II"
- Dope-Guns-'N-Fucking in the Streets Volume 8 – Amphetamine Reptile Records (1994); "Lowstrung"
- Our Band Could Be Your Life: A Tribute to D Boon and The Minutemen – Little Brother Records (1994); "It's Expected I'm Gone"
- Give Me the Cure – Radiopaque Recordings/Corduroy Records (1995); "Meathook"

== Videography ==
- "Cutoff" (1992)
- "Savory" (1994)
- "Cooling Card" (1994)
- "Mirrorful" (1996)
- "Cornflake Girl" (1996)
