= Black Earth, Wisconsin =

- Village
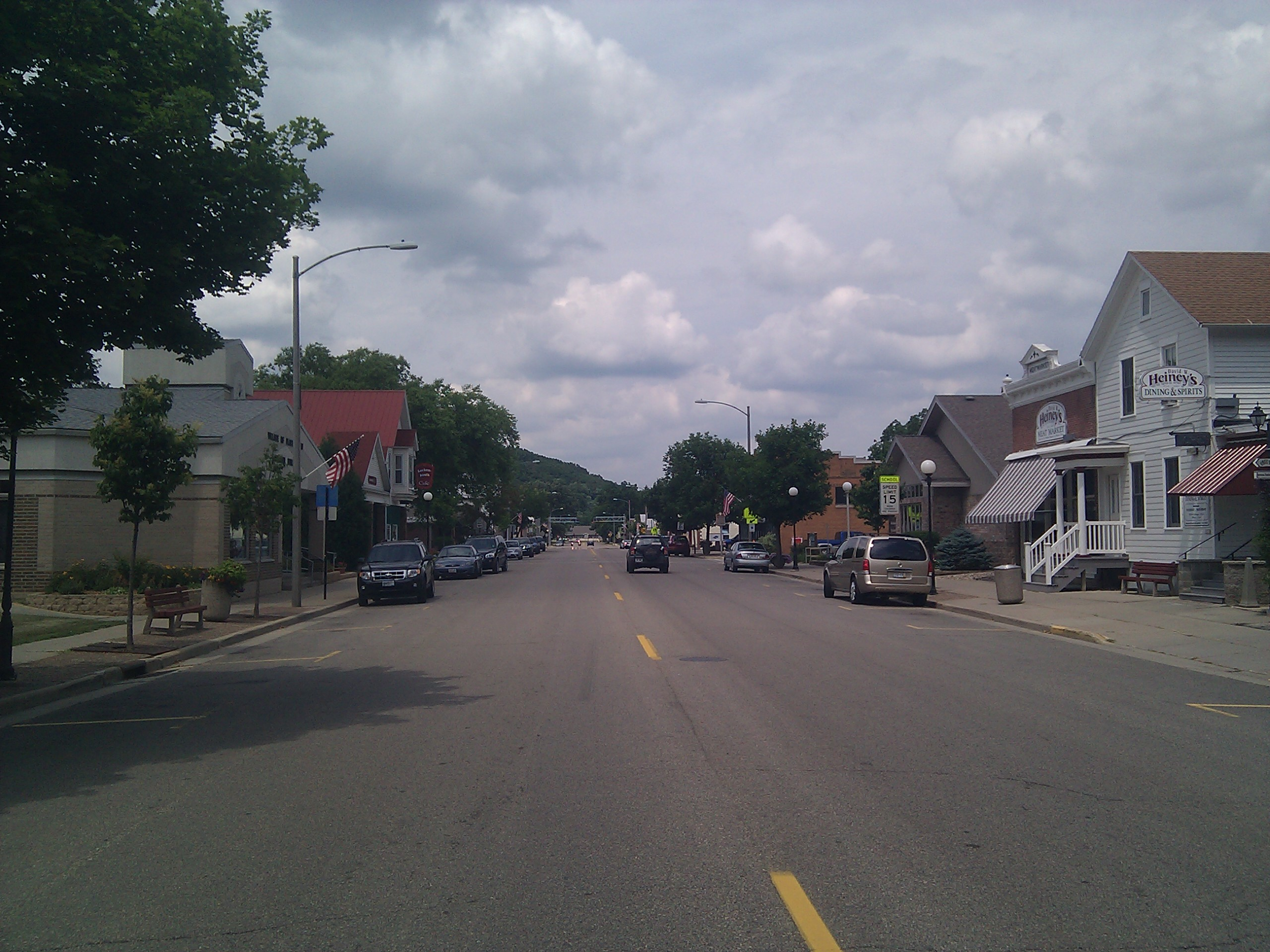

- Location of Black Earth in Dane County, Wisconsin.
- Coordinates: 43°8′12″N 89°44′51″W
- Country: United States
- State: Wisconsin
- County: Dane

Area
  - Total: 0.86 sq mi (2.22 km^{2})
  - Land: 0.85 sq mi (2.19 km^{2})
  - Water: 0.012 sq mi (0.03 km^{2})
- Elevation: 837 ft (255 m)

Population (2020)
  - Total: 1,493
  - Density: 1,770/sq mi (682/km^{2})
- Time zone: UTC-6 (Central (CST))
  - Summer (DST): UTC-5 (CDT)
- Area code: 608
- FIPS code: 55-07825
- GNIS feature ID: 1582820
- Website: Village of Black Earth

Black Earth is a village in Dane County, Wisconsin, United States. The population was 1,493 at the 2020 census. The village is located within the Town of Black Earth. It is part of the Madison Metropolitan Statistical Area.

== History ==
In 1851, the town board renamed the town Farmersville, but the name Black Earth was readopted in 1857.

In June 1984, the Barneveld Tornado ripped through part of Black Earth, damaging and destroying several buildings.

== Geography ==
According to the United States Census Bureau, the village has a total area of 0.86 square miles (2.23 km^{2}), of which 0.85 square miles (2.20 km^{2}) is land and 0.01 square miles (0.03 km^{2}) is water.

== Demographics ==
Historical population
Census	Pop.	Note	%±
1890	355		—
1910	479		—
1920	464		−3.1%
1930	490		5.6%
1940	531		8.4%
1950	655		23.4%
1960	784		19.7%
1970	1,114		42.1%
1980	1,145		2.8%
1990	1,248		9.0%
2000	1,320		5.8%
2010	1,338		1.4%
2020	1,493		11.6%
U.S. Decennial Census

=== 2010 census ===
As of the census of 2010, there were 1,338 people, 559 households, and 346 families living in the village. The population density was 1,574.1 inhabitants per square mile (607.8/km^{2}). There were 582 housing units at an average density of 684.7 per square mile (264.4/km^{2}). The racial makeup of the village was 96.7% White, 0.3% African American, 0.4% Native American, 1.4% Asian, 0.1% from other races, and 1.0% from two or more races. Hispanic or Latino of any race were 1.3% of the population.

There were 559 households, of which 28.6% had children under the age of 18 living with them, 51.7% were married couples living together, 6.8% had a female householder with no husband present, 3.4% had a male householder with no wife present, and 38.1% were non-families. 30.6% of all households were made up of individuals, and 13.4% had someone living alone who was 65 years of age or older. The average household size was 2.32 and the average family size was 2.94.

The median age in the village was 41.5 years. 22.6% of residents were under the age of 18; 6.3% were between the ages of 18 and 24; 26.3% were from 25 to 44; 29.4% were from 45 to 64; and 15.2% were 65 years of age or older. The gender makeup of the village was 49.8% male and 50.2% female.

=== 2000 census ===
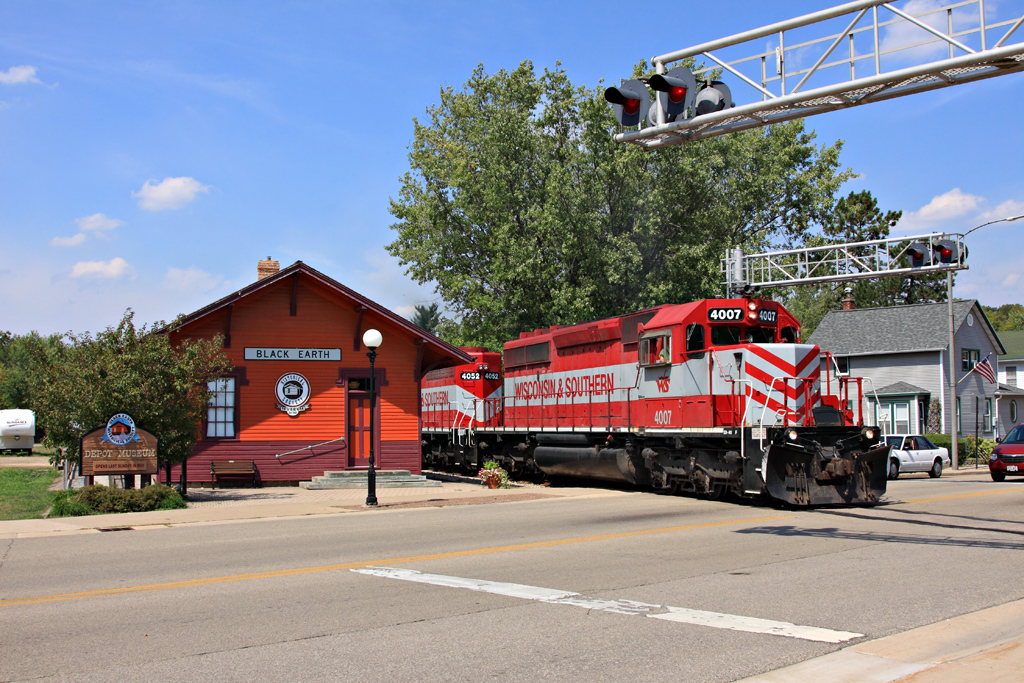
Depot Museum in Black Earth

As of the census of 2000, there were 1,320 people, 514 households, and 358 families living in the village. The population density was 1,991.6 people per square mile (772.2/km^{2}). There were 527 housing units at an average density of 795.1 per square mile (308.3/km^{2}). The racial makeup of the village was 96.97% White, 0.15% Black or African American, 0.38% Native American, 0.68% Asian, 0.08% from other races, and 1.74% from two or more races. 1.21% of the population were Hispanic or Latino of any race.

There were 514 households, out of which 35.4% had children under the age of 18 living with them, 57.0% were married couples living together, 9.3% had a female householder with no husband present And 30.2% were non-families. 25.3% of all households were made up of individuals, and 12.1% had someone living alone who was 65 years of age or older. The average household size was 2.49 and the average family size was 3.01.

In the village, the population was spread out, with 25.9% under the age of 18, 6.1% from 18 to 24, 31.3% from 25 to 44, 21.5% from 45 to 64, and 15.2% who were 65 years of age or older. The median age was 38 years. For every 100 females, there were 94.4 males. For every 100 females age 18 and over, there were 89.2 males.

The median income for a household in the village was $51,548, and the median income for a family was $58,421. Males had a median income of $37,130 versus $28,828 for females. The per capita income for the village was $21,363. About 1.4% of families and 2.2% of the population were below the poverty line, including 2.4% of those under age 18 and 3.7% of those age 65 or over.

== In popular culture ==
Chicago indie rock band Ratboys named a song from their 2023 album The Window after Black Earth.
