= By Surprise =

By Surprise may refer to:

- By Surprise (album), an album by Joy Williams
- By Surprise (band), an American indie rock band
- By Surprise, a song from Peter, Paul and Mary's reunion album in 1978
