= Printer's Devil (album) =

Studio album by Ratboys
- Released: February 28, 2020
- Studios: Decade Music Studios, Chicago, IL
- Genre: Indie rock
- Length: 39:52
- Label: Topshelf
- Producers: Ratboys, Erik Rasmussen

Ratboys chronology
GN (2017)	Printer's Devil (2020)	Happy Birthday, Ratboy (2021)

Professional ratings
Aggregate scores
Source	Rating
AnyDecentMusic?	8.0/10
Metacritic	81/100
Review scores
Source	Rating
AllMusic	3.5/5 stars
Chicago Tribune	4/4 stars
DIY	4/5 stars
Exclaim!	7/10
Paste	7.3/10
Pitchfork	7.7/10

Printer's Devil is the third studio album from American indie rock band Ratboys, released on February 28, 2020. It is the group's first album with bassist Sean Neumann and drummer Marcus Nuccio, both of whom have stayed with the band since release.

== Track listing ==
All lyrics are written by Julia Steiner. Songwriting credits adapted from Tidal.

Printer's Devil track listing
No.	Title	Music	Length
1.	"Alien with a Sleep Mask On"	Steiner, Dave Sagan, Sean Neumann, Marcus Nuccio	3:50
2.	"Look To"	Steiner, Sagan, Neumann, Nuccio	4:00
3.	"My Hands Grow"	Steiner, Sagan, Ian-Paine Jesam	3:52
4.	"A Vision"	Steiner, Sagan, Neumann, Jesam	3:52
5.	"Anj"	Steiner, Sagan, Neumann, Nuccio	3:24
6.	"I Go Out at Night"	Steiner, Sagan, Neumann, Nuccio	3:07
7.	"Victorian Slumhouse"	Steiner, Sagan, Neumann, Nuccio	4:20
8.	"Clever Hans"	Steiner, Sagan, Jesam	5:30
9.	"Listening"	Steiner, Sagan, Nuccio	3:25
10.	"Printer's Devil"	Steiner, Sagan, Neumann, Nuccio, Jesam	4:32
Total length:			39:52

Bandcamp bonus tracks
No.	Title	Music	Length
11.	"Printer's Devil" (demo)	Steiner, Sagan, Neumann, Nuccio, Jesam	3:48
12.	"My Hands Grow" (demo)	Steiner, Sagan, Jesam	3:47
Total length:			47:27

== Personnel ==
All personnel credits for Printers Devil are adapted from the album's liner notes.

Ratboys

- Julia Steiner – vocals, guitar, lyrics
- Dave Sagan – guitar; bass (3, 8, 9); layout
- Sean Neumann – bass (1, 2, 4–7, 10); backing vocals (1)
- Marcus Nuccio – drums, percussion (1, 2, 5–7, 9, 10)
- Ian–Paine Jesam – drums (3, 4, 8, 10); vibes (3)

Technical personnel

- Ratboys – production
- Erik Rasmussen – production, mixing, recording
- Alan Douches – mastering
- Johnny Fabrizio – photography
