= The Window (Ratboys album) =

Studio album by Ratboys
- Released: August 25, 2023
- Recorded: February 2022
- Studios: Hall of Justice, Seattle, WA
- Genres: Alt-country; roots rock
- Length: 47:40
- Label: Topshelf
- Producer: Chris Walla; Ratboys

Ratboys chronology
Happy Birthday, Ratboy (2021)	The Window (2023)	Singin' to an Empty Chair (2026)

The Window is the fifth studio album by Ratboys, released through Topshelf Records on August 25, 2023. For the album, the band decamped to Seattle to record with Chris Walla, best known for his work with Death Cab for Cutie.

== Background ==
Chicago-based indie rockers Ratboys first came to prominence in the 2010s, mounting tours with bands like Foxing and Wild Pink, and releasing well-received albums like GN (2017) and Printer's Devil (2020). The band began writing the album in 2020, and spent the following year practicing the songs twice a week to explore their possibilities. The album was produced by Chris Walla. The band had first met Walla on a tour stop in Montreal, and he agreed to produce the album in 2021. In preparation, the group sent voice memos to Walla, who offered suggestions. The album was recorded across twenty-four days in February 2022 at Walla's Hall of Justice Recording in Seattle. Walla assisted the band in recording to tape for their first time. Steiner considered the album's lyrical content more directly specific than ever before: "A lot of the songs are more personal, more real, [and] more honest," she stated.

Steiner wrote the title track about an experience her grandfather had at the height of the COVID-19 pandemic. Unable to say goodbye to his ailing wife due to pandemic restrictions, he simply saw her through the nursing home window. The song's music video depicts a young couple finding romance amidst scenes set in a grassy field or at the county fair. "Black Earth, WI" is an eight-minute overture with roots rock overtones that was completed in two takes. "Morning Zoo" tackles anxiety-ridden indecision, while "Crossed That Line" was originally meant to soundtrack a friend's film about a fictional punk band.

In support of the album, the band embarked on their first domestic headlining tour.

== Critical reception ==
Professional ratings
Aggregate scores
Source	Rating
Metacritic	83/100
Review scores
Source	Rating
AllMusic	3.5/5 stars
The Skinny	4/5 stars
Pitchfork	8.0/10

The Window received a score of 83 out of 100 on review aggregator Metacritic based on eleven critics' reviews, indicating "universal acclaim". The Skinny's Tony Inglis wrote that the album "is indicative of a newfound assuredness for a band which itself has stretched from a two-piece to a full foursome". Marcy Donelson of AllMusic described The Window as "a volatile [set] that continues a gradual shift in balance toward harsher guitar tones and more energy without shunning the ambling, jangly alt-country that has co-existed with the band's Breeders-revering alt-rock side since their full-length debut".

=== Accolades ===
The Window featured on several publications' lists of the best albums of 2023, ranking on such lists by Paste (fifth), Stereogum (sixth), Exclaim! (8th), Consequence (11th), Slant Magazine (13th), The Line of Best Fit (24th), PopMatters (49th), and Uproxx (of 74 unranked best-of-the-year albums). Pitchfork, meanwhile, listed it as one of 37 unranked best rock albums of the year.

== Track listing ==
All tracks are written by Julia Steiner, David Sagan, Sean Neumann, and Marcus Nuccio.

The Window track listing
No.	Title	Length
1.	"Making Noise for the Ones You Love"	4:03
2.	"Morning Zoo"	3:10
3.	"Crossed That Line"	2:05
4.	"It's Alive!"	3:24
5.	"No Way"	5:37
6.	"The Window"	4:15
7.	"Empty"	3:51
8.	"Break"	4:38
9.	"Black Earth, WI"	8:34
10.	"I Want You (Fall 2010)"	3:48
11.	"Bad Reaction"	4:15
Total length:		47:40

Vinyl bonus track (Flexi-disc)
No.	Title	Length
1.	"It's Alive!" (Nnamdi Remix)

== Personnel ==
All personnel credits for The Window are adapted from the album's liner notes.

Ratboys

- Julia Steiner – vocals, guitar
- David Sagan – guitar
- Sean Neumann – bass, vocals
- Marcus Nuccio – drums; layout

Additional musicians

- Chris Walla – production, mixing; additional instrumentation
- Mike Vernon Davis – mixing; keyboards (2)
- Abby Gunderson – violin (2, 11)

Technical personnel

- Heba Kadry – mastering
- Jennifer Cronin – front and back cover paintings
