= Happy Birthday, Ratboy =

Studio album by Ratboys
- Released: April 1, 2021
- Studios: Type One Studios and band members' homes
- Genre: Indie rock
- Length: 37:31
- Language: English
- Label: Topshelf
- Producers: Adam Beck; Ratboys

Ratboys chronology
Printer's Devil (2020)	Happy Birthday, Ratboy (2021)	The Window (2023)

Happy Birthday, Ratboy is the fourth studio album by American indie rock band Ratboys. The surprise album is a re-recording of the band's earliest material and has received positive reviews from critics.

== Reception ==
Editors at Pitchfork scored this release 7.2 out of 10 and critic Pete Tosiello stated that this album contrasts "cozy nostalgia with hard-rocking instincts", with a more "somber and reflective" tone than 2020's Printer's Devil. Mark Moody of Under the Radar scored this album a 7 out of 10, stating that "the addition of a permanent rhythm section in Marcus Nuccio (drums) and Sean Neumann (bass), the decade old songs are brought to fuller frame" and praised several tracks, noting album closer "Go Outside" as a highlight. "Go Outside" was also recognized as one of the best songs of the week at Paste, where Carli Scolforo considered the title good advice to listeners during the COVID-19 pandemic which also marked a change in the band's sound to a country music influence and the album release was included on a short list of best albums of the week as well.

== Track listing ==
All tracks are written by Julia Steiner.

Happy Birthday Ratboy track listing
No.	Title	Length
1.	"The Stanza"	3:29
2.	"Down the River"	2:34
3.	"Intense Judgment"	5:04
4.	"Key"	3:37
5.	"At 39 Is Annie the Oldest Cat?"	4:17
6.	"Space Blows"	1:46
7.	"Collected"	4:16
8.	"Cacao to Cacao"	2:17
9.	"Have a Heart"	3:36
10.	"88 Fingers Edward"	3:46
11.	"Go Outside"	2:49
Total length:		39:52

== Personnel ==
All personnel credits for Happy Birthday Ratboy are adapted from the album's liner notes.

Ratboys

- Julia Steine – vocals, guitar
- David Sagan – guitar, pocket piano, ukulele, lap steel
- Sean Neumann – bass
- Marcus Nuccio – drums, percussion

Additional musicians

- Evan Loritsch – Rhodes piano (4)
- Mallory Linehan – violin (9)
- Lizzy Jordan – cello (9)
- Pat Lyons – pedal steel (1)

Technical Personnel

- Adam Beck – production
- Ratboys – production
- Jason Cupp – mixing
- Kim Rosen – audio mastering
- Johnny Fabrizio – photography
- Sam Porter – photography

== See also ==
- 2021 in American music
- List of 2021 albums
