= Del Paxton (band) =

American band

Del Paxton is an American emo band from Buffalo, New York. The band was named after Bill Cobbs character in the 1996 film That Thing You Do!

== History ==
Del Paxton began in 2013 with the release of an EP titled Worst. Summer. Ever. via Rochester based record label Secret Audio Club. Del Paxton signed to Topshelf Records in 2015. After signing to the label, the band announced plans to release a split with the band Gulfer, which was released in April 2015. Del Paxton's first full length, All Day, Every Day, All Night was released on March 3, 2017 on Topshelf Records.

The band's second LP, entitled Auto Locator, was released on October 6, 2023 on Topshelf Records. Following the release, Del Paxton embarked on a 7 day tour of the UK in March, 2024.

== Band members ==
- Dylan England (vocals, guitar)
- Greg McClure (drums)
- Zack Schoedel (vocals, bass)

== Discography ==
LPs

- All Day, Every Day, All Night (2017, Topshelf Records)
- Auto Locator (2023, Topshelf Records)

EPs

- Worst. Summer. Ever. (2013, Secret Audio Club)

Splits

- Del Paxton/Gulfer (2016, Topshelf Records)
