= Fear Before (album) =

Studio album by Fear Before
- Released: October 28, 2008
- Recorded: June to July 2008
- Studio: Johnny Cab Studios, London Bridge Studio, Seattle, Washington
- Genre: Experimental rock, post-hardcore
- Length: 38:32
- Label: Equal Vision
- Producer: Casey Bates

Fear Before chronology
The Always Open Mouth (2006)	Fear Before (2008)

Professional ratings
Review scores
Source	Rating
AllMusic	2/5 stars
Alt Press	3.5/5 stars
Lambgoat	3/5 stars

Fear Before is the fourth and final full-length album by the experimental rock band, Fear Before. The album was released on October 28, 2008, by Equal Vision Records and was produced by Casey Bates and recorded at Johnny Cab Studios and London Bridge studio in Seattle. This is the first album on which they do not use their former name "Fear Before the March of Flames".

On September 22, 2008, the band released the song "Fear Before Doesn't Listen to People Who Don't Like Them" in mp3 format exclusively to those on their mailing list. The song is now on their MySpace.

== Track listing ==
No.	Title	Length
1.	"Tree Man"	3:16
2.	"I'm Fine Today"	4:20
3.	"Fear Before Doesn't Listen to People Who Don't Like Them"	3:39
4.	"Get Your Life Together"	3:32
5.	"Jabberwocky"	4:59
6.	"Everything's Not Shitty"	4:15
7.	"Tycho"	3:35
8.	"Bad Days"	4:07
9.	"Stay Weird"	3:33
10.	"Review Our Lives (Epic)"	3:24

== Personnel ==
Fear Before

- David Marion – lead vocals
- Adam Fisher – lead guitar, vocals, keyboards, programming
- Zachary Hutchings – rhythm guitar
- Michael Madruga – bass, backing vocals
- Clayton "Goose" Holyoak – drums

Guest vocals

- Robert Smith of Heavy Heavy Low Low – on track 4
- Zach Carothers of Portugal. The Man – on track 6
- Dreu Damian of I Am The Ocean – on tracks 7 and 10
- Thomas Erak of The Fall of Troy – on track 10
- Quentin Smith of Vaux – on track 10

Production

- Produced and engineered by Casey Bates
- Mastered by Will Quinnell
- Art by David Bell

== Additional information ==
The song "Jabberwocky" is named after the Jabberwocky nonsense poem written by Lewis Carroll. This is the first album where former drummer Brandon Proff does not provide artwork and also the first album not to have some form of skyscrapers on the cover. Instead, David Bell who directed the music video for "Taking Cassandra to the End of the World Party" provides artwork. Also, this is the first album where the majority of the lyrics are written by the lead vocalist, David Marion. On previous albums, the lead guitarist and back up vocalist Adam Rupert Fisher wrote the majority of the lyrics.
