= AOID =

Studio album by Ratboys
- Released: June 9, 2015
- Studios: The Owlery, Chicago
- Length: 33:44
- Label: Topshelf

Ratboys chronology
AOID (2015)	GN (2017)

AOID is the debut album by American indie rock band Ratboys. It was released on 9 June 2015 on Topshelf Records.

== Background ==
Some songs on the album ("Charles Bernstein," "Our Mortician’s Daughter," "Postman Song") had been part of Ratboys' live shows since mid-2012. The oldest song on the album is "Postman Song", which Steiner wrote in 2007, but the majority were written in 2012–2013.

The album was recorded at the Owlery in Chicago at the end of 2014. Steiner recorded her vocals late at night to minimize noise from the shared space they recorded in. Mike Politowicz, bassist and vocalist for Dowsing, passed the recordings to Topshelf Records, who released the album on LP, CD and cassette in 2015.

== Critical reception ==
CMJ and BrooklynVegan reviewed the album positively. GoldFlakePaint called the album a "gleaming, joyous, raucous display of melodic indie-rock," and included it on their "Albums of the year" list in 2015. More recently Elizabeth Handgun of Swim Into the Sound wrote that Ratboys "felt so coherent and solid from their debut, it is hard to imagine improvement."

Kevin Williams of the Chicago Tribune was less positive, writing that the album is "almost like a sketch...really good but feeling incomplete."

== Track listing ==
No.	Title	Length
1.	"AOID"	1:35
2.	"Tixis"	3:28
3.	"MCMXIV"	3:16
4.	"Charles Bernstein"	5:23
5.	"Folk Song for Jazz"	4:03
6.	"Postman Song"	3:23
7.	"Our Mortician's Daughter"	3:16
8.	"Bugs!"	3:22
9.	"Pivotal Dates"	2:51
10.	"And"	3:03
Total length:		33:44

== Personnel ==
Ratboys

- Julia Steiner – guitar, vocals
- Dave Sagan – guitar
- Will Lange – bass
- Pat Kennedy – drums

Technical

- Seth Engel – recording, mixing
- Matt Dewine – mastering
