= Wildhoney (band) =

American musical group

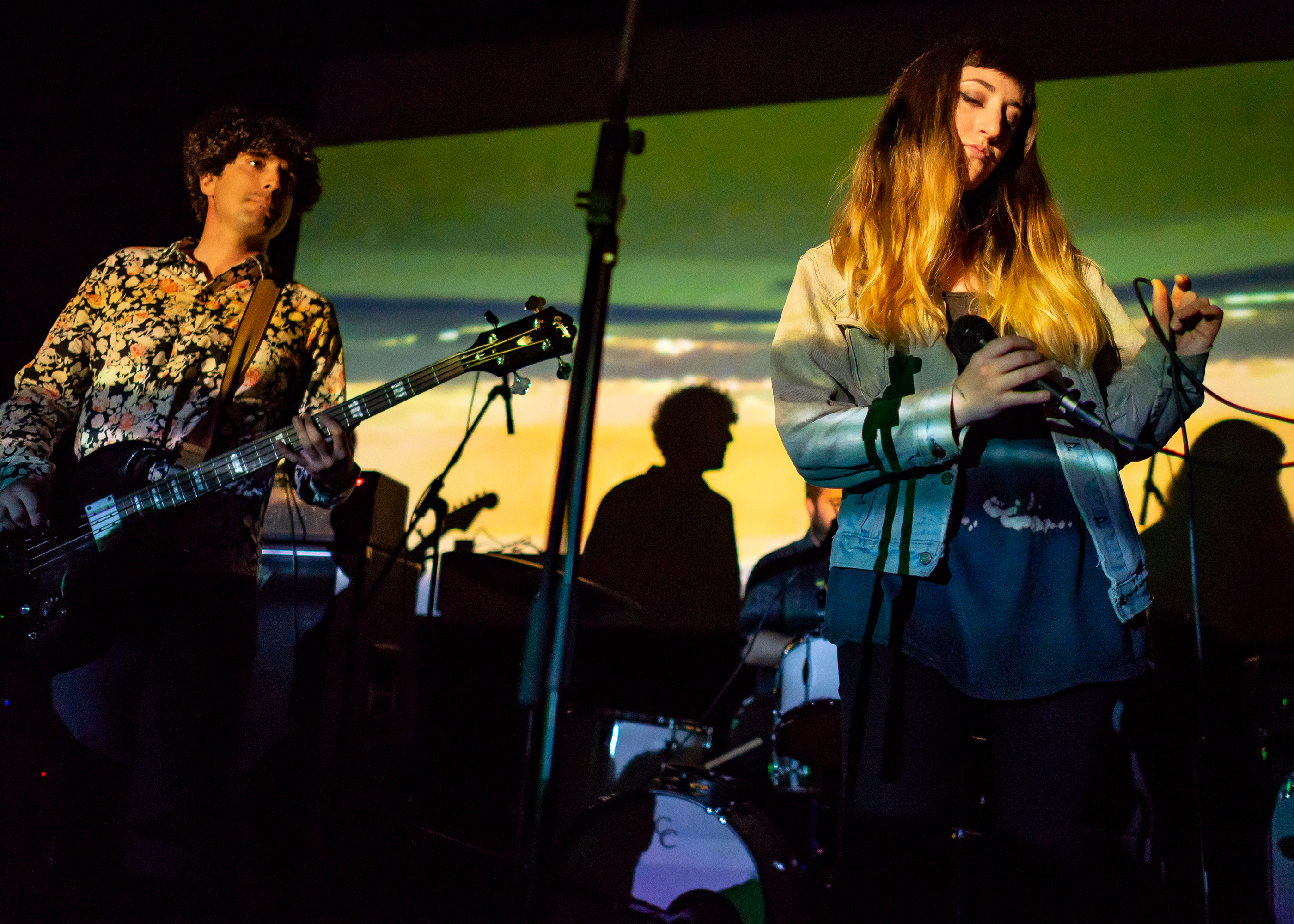

Background information
- Origin: Baltimore, Maryland
- Genres: Shoegaze, indie pop, dream pop, post-punk
- Years active: 2013-present
- Labels: Topshelf Records
- Members: Lauren Shusterich; Joe Trainor; Zach Inscho; Nathan O'Dell; Alan Everhart
- Website: wildhoneysound.com

Wildhoney is an American band from Baltimore, Maryland.

== History ==
Wildhoney began in 2012, releasing their debut self-titled EP the following year. Wildhoney released their second EP, Seventeen Forever, in 2014 on Photobooth Records.

In 2015, Wildhoney signed to Topshelf Records, and released an EP titled Your Face Sideways the same year. Wildhoney released their debut full-length album, Sleep Through It, in 2015 on Deranged/Forward Records.

== Band members ==
- Lauren Shusterich (vocals)
- Joe Trainor (guitar)
- Zach Inscho (drums)
- Nathan O'Dell (guitar)
- Alan Everhart (bass)

== Discography ==
Studio albums

- Sleep Through It (2015, Deranged/Forward)

EPs

- Wildhoney (2013, Nostalgium DIrective)
- Seventeen Forever (2014, Photobooth)
- Your Face Sideways (2015, Topshelf)
- Continental Drift Compilation (2016, Slumberland/Fortuna Pop!)
