= Art Damage =

Studio album by Fear Before the March of Flames
- Released: September 7, 2004
- Recorded: April to May 2004
- Studio: Moontower Studios, Somerville, Massachusetts; Odivision Studios, Somerville, Massachusetts
- Genre: Mathcore; metalcore; screamo
- Length: 29:39
- Label: Equal Vision
- Producer: Matthew Ellard

Fear Before the March of Flames chronology
Odd How People Shake (2003)	Art Damage (2004)	The Always Open Mouth (2006)

Professional ratings
Review scores
Source	Rating
AllMusic	3.5/5 stars
Drowned in Sound	8/10
Now	3/5 stars
Ultimate Guitar	9.5/10

Art Damage is the second album by the post-hardcore band Fear Before the March of Flames, released in 2004. "Should Have Stayed in the Shallows" is the only music video that Fear Before the March of Flames made for the album.

== Critical reception ==
Drowned in Sound described the album as "more screams, more stabbed-at guitars, more noise, more passion, more intelligence, more everything." Exclaim! wrote: "With dissonant riffs laid out over stellar technical drumming, the musical skill exhibited by FBTMOF makes Art Damage a truly interesting listen, as do the added sonic layers of noise and abstract sound."

== Track listing ==
No.	Title	Length
1.	"Hey Kid, I'm a Computer, Stop All the Downloading"	3:08
2.	"Should Have Stayed in the Shallows"	3:11
3.	"Consequences David, You'll Meet Your Fate in the Styx"	3:00
4.	"Whiskey Is Alright in Its Place, But Its Place Is in Hell"	2:19
5.	"The Story of the Curious Oysters"	3:19
6.	"Absolutely Fabulous and Me"	2:47
7.	"The Long Road to the Middle"	2:41
8.	"The State of Texas vs. Fear Before"	2:22
9.	"Law of Averages"	2:09
10.	"A Tyrant Meets His Maker"	0:57
11.	"The God Awful Truth"	3:46

== Personnel ==
Fear Before the March of Flames

- David Marion – lead vocals
- Adam Fisher – guitar, clean vocals
- Mike Madruga – bass, backing vocals
- Brandon Proff – drums

Additional

- Matthew Ellard – producer, engineer, mixing
- Carl Plaster – drum tech
- Alan Douches – mastering
- Brandon Proff – layout and design
