= Knifeplay (band) =

American rock band

- Origin: Philadelphia, Pennsylvania, U.S.
- Genres: Shoegaze; indie rock; dream pop; experimental rock; slowcore
- Years active: 2017–present
- Label: Topshelf
- Members: TJ Strohmer; Alex Stackhouse; Dennis Martiniello; Max Black; Johanna Baumann; Nora Maupin
- Past members: Chris Norcross; Patrick McBride; Alex Ha; Ben Opatut; Jack McBride; John Sciortino; Johnny Klein; Joey Ginaldi
- Website: knifeplayforever.bandcamp.com

Knifeplay is an American shoegaze group from Philadelphia, Pennsylvania.

== History ==
Knifeplay began in 2017 as the solo project of TJ Strohmer, before expanding to a full band. They released their debut album in 2019 titled Pearlty through Window Sill Records. The band signed to Topshelf Records in August 2022, where they announced a new single, "Promise", and their second full-length album titled "Animal Drowning". The album received positive reviews

The band has been compared to Snail Mail, and has been named a "Band To Watch" by Stereogum.

== Members ==
Current

- TJ Strohmer – vocals, guitar (2017–present)
- Alex Stackhouse – bass (2017–present)
- Max Black – piano, synth (2019–present)
- Dennis Martiniello – lead guitar (2026–present)
- Johanna Baumann – guitar, vocals (2022–present)
- Nora Maupin – drums (2023–present)

Former

- Chris Norcross – guitar, keyboards (2017–2018)
- Patrick McBride – guitar (2017–2019)
- Alex Ha – drums (2017–2019)
- Ben Opatut – drums (2019)
- Jack McBride – guitar, keyboards (2019–2022)
- John Sciortino – percussion (2019–2022)
- Joey Ginaldi – drums (2017–2025)
- Johnny Klein – lead guitar (2017–2025)

== Discography ==
=== Studio albums ===
- Pearlty (2019)
- Animal Drowning (2022)
- What Is Truth? (2027)

=== Compilation albums ===
- B-Sides & Rarities (2020)

=== EPs ===
- No Funeral (2017)
- With U (2018)
