= Odd How People Shake =

Studio album by Fear Before the March of Flames
- Released: June 17, 2003
- Recorded: April to May 2003
- Studios: Interlace Studios, Hillsboro, Oregon
- Genres: Post-hardcore; screamo
- Length: 41:02
- Labels: Rise; Equal Vision (re-release)
- Producers: Fear Before the March of Flames; Kris Crummett

Fear Before the March of Flames chronology
Odd How People Shake (2003)	Art Damage (2004)

Professional ratings
Review scores
Source	Rating
AllMusic	2.5/5 stars
Alternative Press	5/5 stars
Drowned in Sound	7/10
Punknews.org	2/5 stars

Odd How People Shake is the first studio album by the post-hardcore band Fear Before, released under their former name, Fear Before the March of Flames. It was released in 2003 via Rise Records. On a budget of $1,500, the album was recorded and co-produced with Kris Crummett at Interlace Studios in Hillsboro, Oregon, from April to May 2003, while the band members were still in high school. A music video was released for the song "The 20th Century Was Entirely Mine".

It was re-released by Equal Vision Records in January 2004.

== Critical reception ==
Drowned in Sound wrote that "this debut is far from the fully-realised final product, but as blueprints for future releases go, it's pretty special."

== Track listing ==
All music written by Fear Before the March of Flames. Piano written by Adam Fisher and Kris Crummett.

No.	Title	Lyrics	Length
1.	"Fashion Tips Baby"	Adam Fisher	1:48
2.	"Go Wash Your Mouth... I Don't Know Where It's Been"	David Marion	6:29
3.	"Given to Dreams"	Fisher	3:35
4.	"Girl's Got a Face Like Murder"	Fisher	1:56
5.	"The Lisbon Girls, Oh the Lisbon Girls"	Fisher	2:30
6.	"The 20th Century Was Entirely Mine"	Marion	3:21
7.	"Sarah Goldfarb, Where Are Your Manners?"	Fisher	3:07
8.	"On the Bright Side, She Could Choke"	Fisher	3:03
9.	"Motelroom.Grandpiano"	Fisher	3:01
10.	"What Happens in Vegas, Stays in Vegas"	Marion	12:12
Total length:			41:02

== Personnel ==
Fear Before the March of Flames

- David Marion – lead vocals, producer
- Adam Fisher – lead guitar, clean vocals, producer
- Mat Clouse – rhythm guitar, producer
- Mike Madruga – bass, backing vocals, producer
- Brandon Proff – drums, artwork, producer

Additional

- John Gourley – vocals on "Motelroom.Grandpiano"
- Kris Crummett – producer, engineer, piano
- Jason Livermore – mastering
