= Gobbinjr =

American singer-songwriter

- Also known as: gobbinjr
- Born: Emma Witmer
- Origin: New York City
- Genres: Indie pop; lo-fi
- Occupations: Musician, singer-songwriter, recording artist
- Instruments: Keyboards, synthesizers, guitar, omnichord, bass, vocals
- Years active: 2015–present
- Labels: Yellow K Records, Topshelf Records, Infinite Best Recordings, JMC Aggregate

Gobbinjr (stylized in all lowercase), the stage name of musician Emma Witmer, is an American indie pop musician from New York City.

== History ==
Emma Witmer grew up in Wisconsin. She began releasing music as a student at New York University. Witmer released her first full-length album titled Manalang on Yellow K Records. In 2016, Witmer released her first EP titled vom night. In 2018, she released her second full-length album; it was her first on the record label Topshelf Records.

== Discography ==
Studio albums

- Manalang (2015, Yellow K Records)
- Ocala Wick (2018, Topshelf Records)

EPs

- Vom Night (2016)
