= Donovan Wolfington =

American punk rock band

- Origin: New Orleans, Louisiana
- Genres: Punk rock, emo, indie rock, hardcore punk
- Years active: 2011–2018
- Label: Topshelf
- Past members: Neil Berthier; Matt Seferian; Alex Skalany; Michael Saladis; Savannah Saxton; Christian Baraks; Christopher Littlejohn; Christopher Lanthier
- Website: donovanwolfingtonmusic.bandcamp.com

Donovan Wolfington were an American punk rock band which formed in New Orleans, Louisiana, United States in 2011.

The band consisted of vocalist and guitarist Neil Berthier, guitarist and vocalist Matthew Seferian, bassist Alejandro Skalany, and drummer Mike Saladis.

== History ==
The band released their debut album "Stop Breathing" in 2013 on Community Records and Broken World Media. Their follow-up EP "Scary Stories You Tell In The Dark" was released on Topshelf Records in 2014.

This was followed up by their full-length album entitled Stop Breathing via Community Records.

In February 2014, Donovan Wolfington sign to Topshelf Records. In 2014, Donovan Wolfington released an EP titled Scary Stories You Tell In The Dark via Topshelf Records.

In August 2015, Donovan Wolfington released their second full-length album titled How to Treat the Ones You Love via Topshelf Records.

The band broke up in 2017. They released their final album, Waves in March 2018, and reconvened to perform a final concert at the Community Records 10th anniversary show on March 10 that year.

== Band members ==
- Neil Berthier (vocals, guitar)
- Matt Seferian (vocals, guitar)
- Alex Skalany (bass)
- Michael Saladis (drums)

Past members

- Savannah Saxton (keyboards, vocals)
- Max Blumenfeld (drums)

== Discography ==
=== Studio albums ===
- Stop Breathing (2013, Broken World Media and Community Records)
- How to Treat the Ones You Love (2015, Topshelf Records)
- Waves (2018, Community Records)

=== EPs ===
- Sometimes Nostalgia (2011, self released)
- Scary Stories You Tell In The Dark (2014, Topshelf Records)
