= My Fictions =

American post-hardcore band

My Fictions is an American post-hardcore band from Lowell, Massachusetts.

== History ==
My Fictions released their first EP, I Want Nothing, in 2011 on Flannel Gurl Records. In 2012, My Fictions signed with Topshelf Records. My Fictions released another EP in 2012 on Topshelf Records titled Always Trapped. In 2013, My Fictions released a split with the band The Saddest Landscape on Topshelf Records titled When You Are Close, I Am Gone. In 2014, My Fictions released their debut full-length album on Topshelf Records titled Stranger Songs.

== Discography ==
Studio albums

- Stranger Songs (2014, Topshelf)
- Touch Of Glass (2024, 1126 Records)

Singles & EPs

- I Want Nothing (2011, Flannel Gurl)
- Merrill & The Lucinda (2011, No Label)
- Always Trapped (2012, Topshelf)
- Time Immemorial (2021, No label, Wolves of Hades)
- Disguise (2022, No Label)

Splits

- My Fictions/Aviator - (2010, No Label)
- My Fictions/The Saddest Landscape - When You Are Close, I Am Gone (2013, Topshelf)
- My Fictions/Dreamwell- (2024, Tor Johnson Records)
