= Wild Ones (band) =

American band

- Origin: Portland, Oregon, United States
- Genre: Dream pop
- Years active: 2010–2018
- Label: Topshelf
- Members: Thomas Himes; Danielle Sullivan; Max Stein; Nick Vicario; Seve Sheldon

Wild Ones were an American dream pop band from Portland, Oregon.

== History ==
Wild Ones began in 2010 with the release of an EP titled You're A Winner. In 2014, they released their first full-length album on Topshelf Records.

In 2015, Wild Ones released an EP titled Heatwave on Topshelf Records.

On December 2, 2022, Sulivan made a post that advertised a release of previously unreleased music which include live session and demo songs on bandcamp.

== Band members ==
- Thomas Himes (keyboard)
- Danielle Sullivan (vocals)
- Max Stein (bass)
- Nick Vicario (guitar)
- Seve Sheldon (drums)

== Discography ==
Studio albums

- Keep It Safe (2014, Topshelf)
- Mirror Touch (2017, Topshelf)

EPs

- You're A Winner (2010)
- Heatwave (2014, Topshelf)
