= The Saddest Landscape =

American post-hardcore band

- Origin: Boston, Massachusetts, U.S.
- Genres: Post-hardcore, screamo
- Years active: 2002–2005, 2009–present
- Labels: Iodine, Topshelf, Cover Your Heart
- Members: Andy Maddox; Andy Farrell; Daniel Danger; Moe Watson
- Past members: Aaron Neigher; Jeremiah Bertz; Si Choi; Hunter; Mike Saffert; Mike Van Buren; Jason Rosenthal; Eric Mauro
- Website: thesaddestlandscape.com

The Saddest Landscape is an American screamo band formed in 2002 in Boston, Massachusetts. They have released five studio albums, with their first album in a decade releasing in 2026 via Iodine Recordings.

== History ==
The Saddest Landscape was formed in 2002. Besides numerous EPs and splits, they have released five studio albums: The Sound of the Spectacle, released in 2003 on Copter Crash Records; Lift Your Burdens High for This Is Where We Cross, released in 2004 on Narshardaa Records; You Will Not Survive, released in 2010 on Cover Your Heart Records; After the Lights, released in 2012 on Topshelf Records; and Darkness Forgives, released in 2015 also on Topshelf.

On November 20, 2025, the band announced their official signing to Iodine Recordings, a new single "Hexes", and a double full-length album Alone With Heaven, released on April 24, 2026. Alone With Heaven features collaborations with Julien Baker, Jeremy Bolm & Evan Weiss.

== Members ==
Current

- Andy Maddox – vocals, guitar (2002–present)
- Andy Farrell – bass (2013–present)
- Daniel Danger – guitar (2014–present)
- Moe Watson – drums (studio/touring 2021–present)

Former

- Aaron Neigher – drums (2002–2018)
- Jeremiah Bertz – bass (2002–2004)
- Si Choi – guitar (2002–2005)
- Hunter – bass (2005)
- Mike Saffert – bass (2008-2009) – guitar (2009–2010)
- Mike Van Buren – bass (2009–2011)
- Jason Rosenthal – guitar (2010)
- Eric Mauro – guitar (2010–2011) – bass (2011–2013)

== Discography ==
Studio albums

- The Sound of the Spectacle (2003)
- Lift Your Burdens High for This Is Where We Cross (2004)
- You Will Not Survive (2010)
- After the Lights (2012)
- Darkness Forgives (2015)
- Alone With Heaven (2026)

EPs

- Cover Your Heart (2002)
- A Promise Was Made... (2005)
- (I Don't Want to Miss You Anymore) (2009)
- Exit Wounded (2013)
- Live at New Alliance (2013)
- Flexi #1 (2013)
- Flexi #2 (2013)

Singles

- "Redefining Loneliness" (2012)
- "Souls Worth Saving" (2015)
- "Hexes" (2025)

Splits

- The Pine / The Saddest Landscape (2003)
- Music Inspired by Rites of Spring Part One with Funeral Diner (2003)
- The Saddest Landscape & Trophy Scars (2009)
- The Saddest Landscape / Pianos Become the Teeth (2010)
- The Saddest Landscape / If Footmen Tire You, What Will Horses Do? (2010)
- The Saddest Landscape & We Were Skeletons (2011)
- The Saddest Landscape / You Blew It! (2012)
- When You Are Close, I Am Gone with My Fictions (2013)
- Frameworks / The Saddest Landscape (2014)
- Pet Symmetry / The Saddest Landscape (2015)

Compilations

- All Is Apologized For. All Is Forgiven (2007)
- Ten Year Anniversary Box Set (2013)
- Declaring War on Nostalgia (2016)
