= My Heart to Joy =

American emo band from Berlin, Connecticut

- Also known as: David Schwimmer; My Heart to Joy at the Same Tone
- Origin: Berlin, Connecticut, United States
- Genres: Emo, melodic hardcore, punk rock, indie rock, post-hardcore
- Years active: 2006–2011; 2013
- Labels: Topshelf Records, Triumph of Life Records
- Past members: Alan Huck; Ryan Nelson; Jon Makowski; Greg Horbal; Chris Teti; Ross Cohen; Steven Buttery

My Heart to Joy was an American emo band from Berlin, Connecticut. Originally formed when the members are at high school, They released a demo, two EPs, a compilation, and an album.

Members of My Heart to Joy went on to play in The World Is a Beautiful Place & I Am No Longer Afraid to Die and Self Defense Family, and previously The Golden Gates, Summit, Connecticut, and Perfect Lines.

== Members ==
- Alan Huck - Drums (2006-2011)
- Ryan Nelson - Guitar, Vocals (2006-2011)
- Jon Makowski - Bass (2006-2009)
- Greg Horbal - Guitar, Vocals (2007-2011)
- Chris Teti - Bass (2009-2010), Guitar (2010-2011)
- Ross Cohen - Bass (2010-2011)
- Steven K Buttery - Drums (2010-2011)

== Discography ==
=== Demo albums ===
- Demo Days (2006)

=== Extended plays ===
- Heavenly Bodies (2007)
- Virgin Sails (2008)
- Reasons To Be (2011)

=== Albums ===
- Seasons In Verse (2009)

=== Compilations ===
- 1990-1999 (2009)
- Excellent Library (Unreleased)

== Reviews ==
- AbsolutePunk: My Heart to Joy - Reasons to Be EP
- PunkNews: My Heart to Joy - Virgin Sails
- PunkNews: My Heart to Joy - Seasons In Verse
