= Trophy Scars =

American experimental rock band

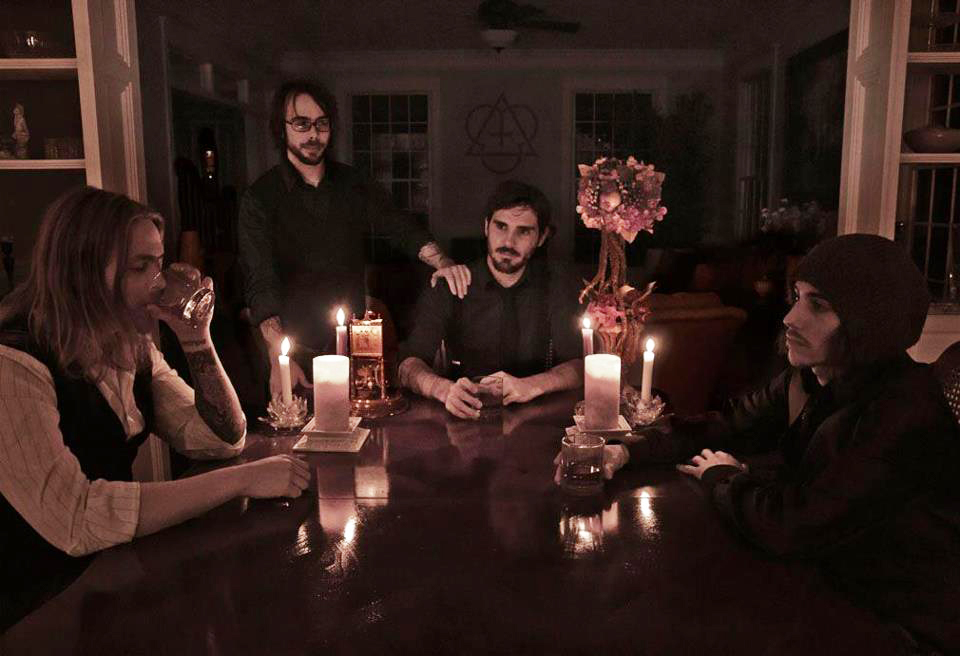
- Trophy Scars in 2012. (L-R: Andy Farrell, John Ferrara, Jerry Jones, Brian Ferrara)

Background information
- Origin: Morristown, New Jersey, U.S.
- Genres: Blues, neo-psychedelia, art rock, indie rock, progressive rock, post-punk, post-hardcore
- Years active: 2002 – present
- Label: Independent
- Spinoffs: All Human, Super Snake, Sea of Glass, The Saddest Landscape
- Members: Jerry Jones; John Ferrara; Brian Ferrara; Andy Farrell; Gray Reinhard; Jonathan O'Hea

Trophy Scars is an American experimental rock band from Morristown, New Jersey, United States, with blues and psychedelic influences. Trophy Scars began as a post-hardcore group but has since embraced broader genres.

Trophy Scars song catalog is embossed by major themes such as time, memory, language, and romantic tragedy. Known for their intimate live shows and independent booking techniques, Trophy Scars evokes a strong DIY ethic.

== Biography ==
Trophy Scars was formed by Jerry Jones (vocals), John Ferrara (guitar), and Brian Ferrara (drums) in June 2002. Originally, the band was developed as a passion project only to last the duration of that particular summer. After several years, and passing through several musicians, the group, which eventually included long standing members Joshua Weinstein on bass and Mike Schipper on guitar, began playing local shows and gaining a modest but dedicated following. When fans presented a high demand for recorded material, Trophy Scars decided to establish themselves as a serious music group.

Trophy Scars signed to Brooklyn-based record label, the Death Scene Recording Company (US), in 2005 and with Small Town Records (UK) in 2007. However, in 2009 they were no longer contractually obligated to either label and decided to release all forthcoming material independently. The band cited having complete control over their art and work schedule as a major reason for doing so.

Since 2002, Trophy Scars has incurred multiple member changes. The core group remain intact, however; Jerry Jones, John Ferrara, and Brian Ferrara are still concrete players, as well as Andy Farrell, who has been playing bass with the group since 2005. Studio personnel is also a rotating door of auxiliary musicians with producer, Chris Badami, as the sole stationary component to all of Trophy Scars' albums. Badami acts as the "fifth" Trophy Scars member; as Jones cites: "(He is) our George Martin."

Trophy Scars have released four full-length records, four EPs, a single, and a compilation of demos and unreleased material. Their first full-length, Darts to the Sea, was recorded in John Ferrara's basement using primitive sound engineering equipment. The record was released in 2003 and reissued in 2006 with a companion disc, Sand in the Sea, which included unreleased b-sides and demos from 2003-2004. Trophy Scars gained the attention of critics with their second release, Hospital Music for the Aesthetics of Language EP in 2004. The EP was the first output they recorded with Chris Badami and saw the band taking an unconventional, progressive approach to post-hardcore. The EP was reissued with new packaging and artwork in 2007.

Trophy Scars followed Hospital Music with a second EP, Goodnight Alchemy, in 2005. Goodnight Alchemy was another turning point for the band; the EP was markedly much more dense and heavy than its predecessor. It was also the first Trophy Scars effort distributed by a label (The Death Scene Recording Company). 2006 saw the release of their second full-length album, Alphabet. Alphabets. Trophy Scars demonstrated a conglomeration of different musical genres and styles while still retaining their unique take on post-hardcore. Following the release, the group became a full-time touring band when Jones graduated from Fordham University.

In mid-2007, Trophy Scars rented a beach house in Charleston, South Carolina to begin work on their follow-up full length to Alphabets. The band was heavily influenced by the warm climate, the city's nightlife, and psychedelia. Yet again, Trophy Scars readjusted their sound; this time to a blues-centric style. Jones titled the album Bad Luck as a reaction to the death of his best friend, Ben Brown. When the writing was completed for Bad Luck, the band invested their savings into a European tour, but was canceled last minute by the headlining act. Unable to get a refund on their European travel expenses and with their recording contract with the Death Scene dissolved, the band could not afford to tour or raise money for the album. The band was forced to go on an indefinite hiatus with no foreseeable plans to release Bad Luck. Trophy Scars fans, however, banded together and started the "Bad Luck Foundation", which allowed internet users to donate money to the band. Within a month, Trophy Scars was financially stable and able to record their third full-length. In September 2009, Trophy Scar supported Fear Before and Baptized in Blood on a full Canadian tour titled "The Hunt for Shred October". In January 2010, Bad Luck was named the 10th best album of 2009 by popular music critic website, Sputnik Music.

Eight months after the release of Bad Luck, Trophy Scars put out a 7" vinyl split with the Saddest Landscape. The offering included a new, orchestral song, "August, 1980", inspired by Bram Stoker's Dracula and the Saddest Landscape's "So Lightly Thrown." Trophy Scars released the EP, Darkness, Oh Hell, in October 2010. The album is a further throwback to the blues and psychedelic rock music of the late 1960s while retaining a sinister edge. Darkness, Oh Hell was included in Sputnik Music's Top 50 Albums of 2010 as one of the best EPs of the year.

Trophy Scars released the follow-up to Darkness, Oh Hell, another EP, titled Never Born, Never Dead on July 19, 2011. The EP serves as the counter-piece to Darkness, Oh Hell and is much more uplifting musically and lyrically. The concept revolves around the several lives of two souls fixed in love through reincarnation. Although a departure in sound from the previous two releases, Never Born, Never Dead was met with strong praise and elected the #1 Best EP of the Year by Sputnik Music users.

The band announced they would be releasing their forthcoming full length, Holy Vacants, April 8, 2014 via Monotreme Records. The LP is a linear concept involving a romantic couple who have discovered The Fountain of Youth in the blood cells of angels. Jones states the album was heavily influenced by an intense personal relationship, his brief relocation to Los Angeles, and film director David Lynch.

A DVD containing videos that span their career, as well as documentary footage and a live concert recorded in November, 2010, is presumably in the works for an undetermined release date.

Astral Pariah, the band's first album in 7 years, was released September 10, 2021. The 9-track concept album, which was entirely self-produced and mixed, tells the story of a family during the post-Civil War era of western expansion.

== Other projects ==
In 2011, members of Trophy Scars began their own pseudo-label, known as The Same Ghost Collective. The initial artist lineup included Nigel Silverthorn, Trickster Fox, and The Gallerist. As a result of being a part of the label, each artist worked closely with the members of Trophy Scars to release their music. John produced Nigel Silverthorn's album The Tip of the Tongue. The Teeth. The Lips. Andy provided bass, and Brian played drums. Jerry Jones provided artwork for the record and was featured on the track "My Bare Hands".

Jerry produced the Trickster Fox record The Misadventures of, Vol. 1 and put together the video for "Dear John, Segue I". This also featured members of the band.

A Falling Waltz by The Gallerist was also produced by John and featured Andy and Brian on the record.

In 2017, The Same Ghost Collective released a limited to 250 vinyl pressing of King Gizzard & the Lizard Wizard's Polygondwanaland.

Jerry Jones started the band Super Snake in 2012 with Vinnie Fiore, Jesse Mariani, & John Pinho. They have since released 2 EPs (titled Summer Girls and Rider) and 2 full-length records (Leap of Love and Volume 4: Influenza Forever). All of which, with the exclusion of Leap of Love', were produced by John Ferrera. Andy Farrell joined the band in 2019.

John Ferrara produced the album Hold Onto Your Luck by Trophywife. as well as records from Chocolate Bread, Red Light Green Light, I AM HERESY, The Nathan Gray Collective, Curse the Mariner, Love Automatic, Young Thieves, The Natalie Fight, and Inamere.

Andy Farrell has been a consistent bassist for The Saddest Landscape and released music throughout 2014 under the pseudonym of "Sea of Glass". including tracks featuring Jerry Jones and other members of The Same Ghost Collective.

Brian Ferrara joined Adam Rupert for All Human in 2014. Their first collaboration together, “Teenagers, You Don't Have to Die!” also featured Andy Farrell on bass. John Ferrara and Jerry Jones had a presence on select tracks, as well. It was recorded at different locations by Adam Fisher, John Ferrara, and Brian Ferrara; John Ferrara mixed the LP, and it was mastered by Scott Hull at Masterdisk, NYC.

Jerry Jones provided artwork for Welcome to Limerick's 2012 EP Composure. Composure,. In 2013, he starred in a short film titled "Forest". In 2018, Jones started Gruesome Twosome Records.

=== Guest appearances ===
| Year | Song | Artist |
|---|---|---|
| 2007 | "Brush Your Teeth" (featuring Jerry Jones) | The Natalie Fight |
| 2008 | "Gucci Girl" (featuring Jerry Jones) | Jacobi Wichita |
| 2011 | "New York, Yeah Scranton" (featuring Jerry Jones) | Intensus |
| 2011 | "My Bare Hands" (featuring Jerry Jones) | Nigel Silverthorn |
| 2012 | "Thief" (featuring Jerry Jones) | Trophywife |
| 2012 | "Hoodoo Rising" (featuring Jerry Jones) by | Reese Van Riper |
| 2012 | "Promenade" (featuring Jerry Jones) | Reese Van Riper |
| 2013 | "Designed With You In Mind" (featuring Jerry Jones) | Celebrity Skin |
| 2016 | "Where's My Upslope?" (featuring Jerry Jones and John Ferrera) | All Human |
| 2016 | "Sad Little World" (featuring John Ferrera) | All Human |
| 2016 | "Asleep on the Church Steps" (featuring John Ferrera) | All Human |
| 2016 | "Suffer" (featuring Jerry Jones) | Grail |

== Members ==
=== Current ===
- Jerry Jones - vocals
- John Ferrara - guitar, vocals
- Brian Ferrara - drums, vocals, extra percussion
- Andy Farrell - bass, vocals
- Gray Reinhard - piano
- Jonathan O'Hea - rhythm guitar

=== Former ===
- Adam Moutafis - guitar and piano
- A.J. Hanson - guitar, vocals
- Joshua Z Weinstein - Bass
- Joshua Wiseman - guitar, vocals

== Discography ==
=== Albums ===
| Year | Title | Album details | Notes |
|---|---|---|---|
| 2003 | Darts to the Sea | Release date: February 11, 2003; Label: Over and Out Records | Re-released in 2006 as Darts to the Sea / Sand in the Sea on AOA Records. |
| 2006 | Alphabet. Alphabets. | Release date: June 13, 2006; Label: The Death Scene Recording Company | Limited to 500 vinyl re-release in 2012 through Simply Legendary Records. |
| 2009 | Bad Luck | Release date: March 17, 2009; Label: Independent | Limited to 1,000 physical copies; Limited to 500 vinyl re-release in 2014 through Monotreme Records. |
| 2014 | Holy Vacants | Release date: April 21, 2014; Label: Monotreme Records | Vinyl pressing limited to 950. |
| 2021 | Astral Pariah | Release date: September 10, 2021; Label: Gruesome Twosome Records | Limited to 550 vinyl release. |

=== EPs ===
| Year | Title | Album details | Notes |
|---|---|---|---|
| 2004 | Hospital Music for the Aesthetics of Language | Release date: 2004; Label: Independent | Re-released January 19, 2007 in limited to 1,000 digipak CD format through Reap What You Sew Records. |
| 2005 | Goodnight Alchemy | Release date: June 3, 2005; Label:The Death Scene Recording Company | Limited to 250 vinyl re-release in 2013 through The Same Ghost Collective. |
| 2009 | the saddest landscape & trophy scars (7" Split) | Release date: November 27, 2009; Label:Bear Records | Features original recording of "August, 1980" |
| 2010 | Darkness, Oh Hell | Release date: October 26, 2010; Label:Independent | Released in limited to 1,000 digipak CD format.; Limited to 500 vinyl re-release in 2017 through The Same Ghost Collective. |
| 2011 | Never Born, Never Dead | Release date: July 19, 2011; Label:Independent | Released in limited to 1,000 digipak CD format.; Limited to 500 vinyl re-release in 2018 through Gruesome Twosome Records. |

=== Compilations ===
| Year | Title | Album details | Notes |
|---|---|---|---|
| 2004 | The Only Constant Is Change | Release date: Label: Volcom Entertainment | Contributed "Designed Like Dice (Crickets in Tune)" from Hospital Music for the Aesthetics of Language |
| 2004 | Music on the Brain Volume 1 | Release date: Label: Smartpunk Records | Contributed "And That's Where They Found My Body" from Hospital Music for the Aesthetics of Language |
| 2006 | Peep Show | Release date: Label: 1120 Studios | Contributed "Alchemist. Alchemists." from Alphabet. Alphabets. |
| 2007 | Sound Check No. 100 | Release date: September 2007; Label: Rock Sound | Contributed "Assistant. Assistants." from Alphabet. Alphabets. |
| 2014 | Monotreme Records Indie Labels Market Summer 2014 Sampler | Release date: Label: Monotreme Records | Contributed "Hagiophobia" from Holy Vacants |
| 2014 | It's Not Us, It's You | Release date: March 7, 2014; Label: Independent | Cover compilation released digitally through Trophy Scars' bandcamp. |
| 2015 | Monotreme Records Indie Labels Market Winter 2015 Sampler | Release date: Label: Monotreme Records | Contributed "Hagiophobia" from Holy Vacants |
| 2018 | Monotreme Records @ fifteen | Release date: February 4, 2018; Label: Monotreme Records | Contributed "Archangel" from Holy Vacants |

=== Other songs ===
| Year | Title | Notes |
|---|---|---|
| 2007 | "Bad View" | One month limited digital release through sonicjunkie.net packaged with 9 other tracks from bands including: Thrice, The Human Abstract, So They Say, and Young Widows. |
| 2017 | Panic Machine | |
| 2020 | Artist. Artists. 2020 | Re-recording of Artist. Artists from 2006 release Alphabet. Alphabets.; Intended for a 2-track 7" release through Gruesome Twosome Records that never came to be. |

=== Music videos ===
| Year | Song | Director |
|---|---|---|
| 2003 | "Designed Like Dice" | Joshua Z Weinstein |
| 2006 | "Jerry's The Name, Sociology Is My Game" | Fallout Studios |
| 2006 | "Assistant. Assistants" | Fallout Studios |
| 2009 | "Anna Lucia" | Adam Kobylarz |
| 2011 | "Darkness" | Joshua Z Weinstein |
| 2011 | "Messengers" | Kyle Graffam and Joshua Z Weinstein |
| 2014 | "Archangel" | Frank Fenimore |
