= Fear Before =

American post-hardcore band

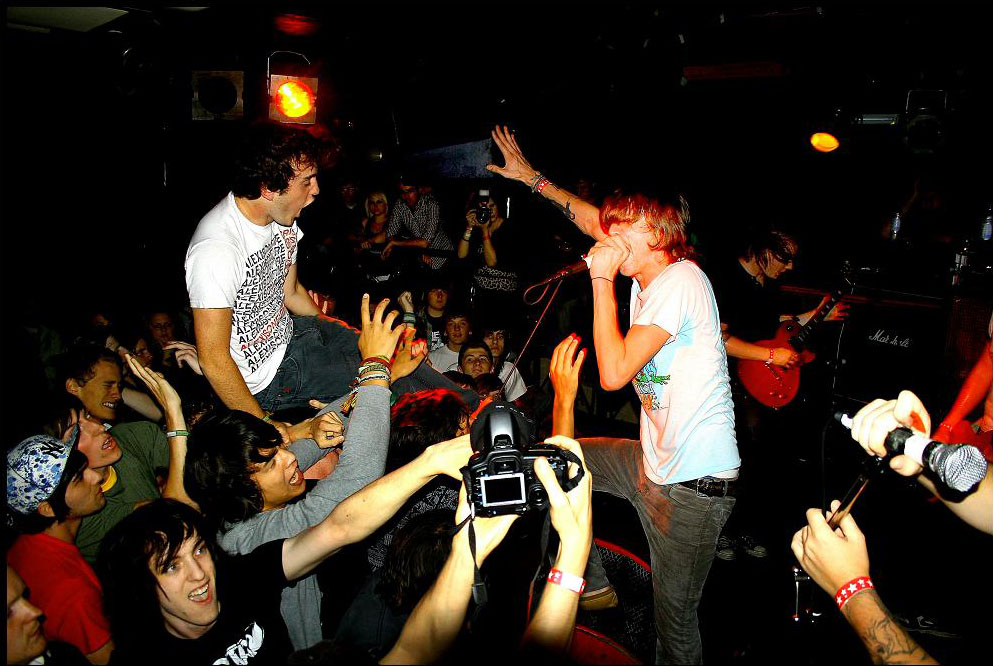
- Fear Before performing live in 2007

Background information
- Also known as: Fear Before the March of Flames
- Origin: Aurora, Colorado, U.S.
- Genres: Experimental rock, post-hardcore, mathcore (early), screamo (early)
- Years active: 2002–2010 (on hiatus)
- Labels: Rise, Equal Vision
- Past members: David Michael Marion; Adam Rupert Fisher; Mike Madruga; Clayton Holyoak; Brandon Proff; Billy Johnson; Mat Clouse; Zachary Hutchings
- Website: fearbefore.net (Archived from March 3rd, 2016)

Fear Before (originally known as Fear Before the March of Flames) was an American post-hardcore band formed in Aurora, Colorado. Their name originated from a newspaper headline about the 2002 Hayman Fire titled "The Fear Before The March of Flames." They released four albums: Odd How People Shake (2003), Art Damage (2004), The Always Open Mouth (2006), and Fear Before (2008). In 2010 the band announced went on indefinite hiatus. Fear Before drew inspiration from bands including Botch, Converge and The Blood Brothers.

== Biography ==
In 2002, Fear Before the March of Flames was formed in Aurora, Colorado with vocalist David Marion, guitarist/vocalist Adam Fisher, bassist Michael Madruga, and drummer Brandon Proff. The members met at Smoky Hill High School in Aurora, although Fisher is the only Colorado native. The band took their name from a local newspaper headline when wildfires swept through their state. They drew inspiration from bands such as Botch, Converge and The Blood Brothers in creating their music. Prior to forming Fear Before, Fisher, Madruga, and Proff were in a pop-punk band together called thirtysixflip. Marion was responsible for their merchandise. After they decided to pursue a more abrasive post-hardcore/mathcore direction, Marion joined, and Fear Before the March of Flames was born.

The band played their first show on August 1, 2002. In July and October 2002, the band recorded a three-song debut EP with Jason Anderson at Grey Music Recording Company in Thornton, Colorado. They sold copies of the EP on their early tours, gaining the attention of Portland-based Rise Records.

=== Odd How People Shake (2002–2003) ===
Once signed to Rise, the band released their debut album Odd How People Shake in July 2003. This was primarily in the vein of post-hardcore, featuring a mix of screamed vocals from Marion and clean singing from Fisher. It is rumoured that every song on the album is based on a movie ("Sarah Goldfarb, Where are Your Manners?", for example, is about Requiem for a Dream)

They became known outside Colorado from tours with bands such as The Blood Brothers and Hopesfall. After touring with Bear vs. Shark, they signed to the more prominent Equal Vision Records, who re-released their debut in January 2004.

In concert, the band played few songs from their debut, and at one point explicitly stated that they would not play "On the Brightside, She Could Choke". However, they did play it on several occasions, including a hometown show in Denver, during which they asked the audience what song they wanted to hear during the encore. Following chants for "Brightside", and after some hesitation, the band played the song in its original form for the first time since 2003.

=== Art Damage (2004–2005) ===
During summer 2004, the band played with Evergreen Terrace and I Killed the Prom Queen on the Radiotakeover Tour. They also played select dates with Norma Jean in August and October. In September, they released Live at the Epicentre, a live EP recorded at The Epicentre in San Diego, California.

Their second album, Art Damage, was released on Equal Vision Records in September 2004, and was a marked change in direction for the band. It featured "a much more straightforward, significantly harder style", influenced by mathcore. The video for the single "Should Have Stayed in the Shallows" was filmed in the same basement as the one used in the film Fight Club and was heavily rotated on MTV2's show Headbanger's Ball.

Through April 2005, the band toured with Underoath and The Chariot. They also played on the Sounds of the Underground tour on Midwest and Southeast dates.

On October 18, 2005, Immortal Records released the soundtrack for the Masters of Horror television series. Fear Before the March of Flames provided a previously unreleased song, "237", for the soundtrack. The song took its name from the infamous room number from the film The Shining. It was featured in the credits for the Tobe Hooper-directed episode "Dance of the Dead".

=== The Always Open Mouth (2006–2007) ===
In June 2006, the band played at the 7 Angels 7 Plagues Reunion Show, and in August they played at the Dirt Fest.

Their third studio album, The Always Open Mouth, was released on September 19, 2006. Fischer explained that the title referred to people who act like "An all-knowing super being from another realm sent here to save us all, or be a fucking loud mouth bigot. They are The Always Open Mouth." The album marked a different and more experimental sound, with more emphasis on antiphony between the lead vocalist Marion and guitarist/vocalist Fisher, and considerably less screaming. It was described as "boldly experimental and brimming with musical complexity". Responding to fans who found the album a considerable large departure from the sound of Art Damage, the band stated that they "just wanted to do something we hadn't done before."

The first single from the album was the song "Taking Cassandra to the End of the World Party", for which a video was filmed with director David Bell. The song references the Greek legend of Cassandra.

Following the album's release, Proff left the band to pursue a teaching career. Drummer Clayton "Goose" Holyoak, guitarist Zach "Binks" Hutchings, and guitarist/keyboardist Billy Johnson joined as new members.

From October to December 2006, the band played with previous tour-mates Norma Jean, and Between the Buried and Me, on the first Radio Rebellion Tour. In March 2007, the band played a portion of the Russian Circles Plan Midwest Tour and one day at the Appalachian Annihilation Festival. That month, touring guitarist Billy Johnson left the band for personal reasons.

In summer 2007 the band embarked on their first headlining tour with 65daysofstatic, This Will Destroy You, and Hot Cross as support. For this tour they released a limited edition EP titled A Little Less Teeth, featuring live sessions, outtakes, and demos.

The band had planned to release a DVD titled Absolute Past, Absolute Future during 2007. This would cover their tour before recording The Always Open Mouth and the two months spent in Seattle recording the album. However, the footage was lost and the release was scrapped.

=== Fear Before (2008–2009) ===
In the January 2008 issue of Alternative Press, the band was featured as having one of the most anticipated albums of the year. The album, titled Fear Before, was recorded in Seattle at Johnny Cab Studios with producer Casey Bates during summer 2008 and was released October 28, 2008.

The self-titled album marked many changes for the band. It was the first on which lead vocalist Marion contributed the majority of lyrics; previously Adam Fisher had done so. In contrast to their previous work, most of Marion's vocals are sung rather than screamed. It was also the first album to feature drummer Clayton 'Goose' Holyoak, and the first and last album on which Zachary 'Binks' Hutchings had a substantial writing role. He had previously played on The Always Open Mouth but did not contribute to writing. The album features guest vocals by Thomas Erak from The Fall of Troy, Zachary Carothers of Portugal. The Man, Robert Smith of Heavy Heavy Low Low, Quentin Smith of Vaux, and Dreu Damian of I Am The Ocean. One song from the album, "Review Our Lives", is a revised version of "Epic Song", which was previously released as a live session on their A Little Less Teeth EP.

In September 2008 they embarked on a headlining tour with Damiera and I Am the Ocean as support. The band announced on September 9, 2008 that they would be dropping "The March of Flames" from their name, and would from now on be known as simply "Fear Before".

In early 2009, Zach Hutchings left the band to join I Am the Ocean. Adam Fisher stated that Hutchings left due to personal and creative tensions. The band decided to remain a four piece. After Binks' departure, the band supported Alesana on a package tour that spring. In the summer, they toured Australia for the first time. After their friend Trent Jacobi fell through the roof of a house and was hospitalized, Fear Before posted their discography on Bandcamp to raise money to cover hospital bills. Tour and labelmates Circa Survive also released a limited edition 7" featuring b-sides from On Letting Go to raise money for Jacobi.

After returning from Australia they headlined their final two tours. The first was in the United States with Oceana and Memphis May Fire as support. The second tour, titled The Hunt for Shred October, was across Canada with Baptized in Blood, Trophy Scars and Black Moor from August to September. The band planned to not tour in 2010 and instead stay home and continue work on their fifth album. Their last show before their hiatus began was on December 4, 2009 at the Crabtree Brewing Company in Greeley, Colorado.

=== Possible fifth album and indefinite hiatus (2010–present) ===
In January 2011, Adam Fisher played his first solo show at the Larimer Lounge in Denver, Colorado. He revealed that the songs he had been writing were not quite right for Fear Before, and later dubbed the project All Human. After playing several local shows in the Denver and Salt Lake City areas, he released the first All Human demos online. A 14-track album tentatively titled Catholic Guilt and the Queerest of Thoughts was expected to be released later in the year, and is notable for featuring original Fear Before drummer Brandon Proff on many of the tracks. After close to 18 months of silence from the band, Fisher posted a message on Facebook, signaling an indefinite hiatus. Three days later he made another statement making it clear the band was not breaking up.

As of October 20, 2014 the band had alluded on Facebook to new upcoming material, saying "New songs... No hoax." The band has since updated Facebook to reflect new material titled "Absolute Future Absolute Past".

== Musical style ==
Johnny Loftus of AllMusic describes the band's sound as "a hybrid of screamo, metal, and terse post-hardcore dynamics."

== Members ==
Final line-up

- David Michael Marion – unclean vocals, rhythm guitar, programming, production, keyboards (2002–2011)
- Adam "Rupert" Fisher – lead guitar, keyboards, programming, percussion, production, strings, clean vocals (2002–2011)
- Michael Madruga – bass, backing vocals (2002–2011)
- Clayton "Goose" Holyoak – drums, percussion (2006–2011)

Former members

- Mat Clouse – rhythm guitar (2002–2003)
- Brandon Proff – drums, programming (2002–2006)
- Zachary "Binks" Hutchings – rhythm guitar (2006–2009)
- Billy Johnson – rhythm guitar, keyboards, programming (2006–2007)

== Discography ==
=== Studio albums ===
Year	Album	Label	Chart peaks		
Year	Album	Label	US	US Heat	US Indie
2003	Odd How People Shake	Rise	—	—	—
2004	Art Damage	Equal Vision	—	—	—
2006	The Always Open Mouth	Equal Vision	153	2	13
2008	Fear Before	Equal Vision	—	8	46
"—" denotes a release that did not chart.

=== EP ===
- Fear Before the March of Flames (2002) – self-released
- A Little Less Teeth (2007) – Equal Vision Records

=== Live ===
- Live at the Epicentre (2004) – Equal Vision Records

=== DVD ===
- Absolute Future, Absolute Past DVD – Equal Vision Records
  - This DVD footage was lost; Adam told the story in the AP Podcast, available on iTunes.

=== Songs on compilations ===
- Rise 2003 Sampler (Rise Records, date unknown)
  - Track number unknown: "A Shoreline Perspective"
- Rise 2004 Sampler (Rise Records, May 2004)
  - Track 3: "Given To Dreams of What Shall Never"
- Take Action! Vol. 4 (Sub City Records, September 2004)
  - Disc 1, Track 13: "Consequences David, You'll Meet Your Fate In The Styx"
- Equal Vision Winter 2004 Sampler (Equal Vision Records, 2004)
  - Track 3: "The State of Texas vs. Fear Before"
- Masters of Horror Soundtrack (Immortal Records, September 2005)
  - Disc 2, Track 14: "237"
- Equal Vision Warped Tour Sampler (Equal Vision Records, 2006)
  - Track 1: "Lycanthropy"
- The Best of Taste of Chaos (Warcon Enterprises, 2006)
  - Disc 1, Track 17: "Should Have Stayed in the Shallows"
- 2004 Vans Warped Tour Compilation (MCA Records, 2004)
  - Disc 2 Track 13: "On the Bright Side, She Could Choke"
- Take Action! Vol. 6 Disc 1 (Sub City Records 2007)
  - "Taking Cassandra to the End of the World Party"

== Videography ==
Year	Song	Album
2003	"The 20th Century Was Entirely Mine"	Odd How People Shake
2004	"Should Have Stayed in the Shallows"	Art Damage
2006	"Taking Cassandra to the End of the World Party"	The Always Open Mouth
2007	"The Waiting Makes Me Curious"	The Always Open Mouth
2007	"My (Fucking) Deer Hunter"	The Always Open Mouth
2008	"Fear Before Doesn't Listen to People Who Don't Like Them"	Fear Before
