= Cut Teeth =

American rock band

- Origin: Chicago, Illinois
- Genres: Punk rock, indie rock
- Years active: 2012–present
- Labels: Topshelf Records
- Members: Dustin Currier; Dan Yingling; Kyle Johns; Matt Jordan
- Website: cutteethband.bandcamp.com

Cut Teeth are an American rock band from Chicago, Illinois.

== History ==
Cut Teeth began in 2012, releasing their first EP titled Televandalism via Topshelf Records.

In October 2014, Cut Teeth released their first full-length album, Night Years, via Topshelf Records.

== Band members ==
- Dustin Currier (vocals, guitar)
- Dan Yingling (guitar)
- Kyle Johns (bass, backing vocals)
- Matt Jordan (drums)

== Discography ==
Studio albums

- Night Years (2014, Topshelf)

EPs

- Televandalism (2012, Topshelf)
