= GN (album) =

Studio album by Ratboys
- Released: June 30, 2017
- Studio: Atlas Studios
- Length: 42:38
- Label: Topshelf
- Producer: Mike Crotty

Ratboys chronology
AOID (2015)	GN (2017)	Printer's Devil (2020)

Professional ratings
Aggregate scores
Source	Rating
Metacritic	77/100
Review scores
Source	Rating
AllMusic	3/5 stars
The A.V. Club	B+
DIY	4/5 stars
Exclaim!	7/10
Under the Radar	7/10

GN is the second studio album by American indie rock band Ratboys. The album was released on June 30, 2017.

== Track listing ==
All songs written by Julia Steiner.

No.	Title	Length
1.	"Molly"	4:20
2.	"Elvis Is in the Freezer"	2:59
3.	"Westside"	4:15
4.	"Control"	4:44
5.	"Crying About the Planets"	5:55
6.	"Dangerous Visions"	4:39
7.	"Wandered"	4:33
8.	"GM"	4:10
9.	"The Record"	3:18
10.	"Peter the Wild Boy"	3:45
Total length:		42:38
