= The Always Open Mouth =

Studio album by Fear Before The March of Flames
- Released: September 19, 2006
- Recorded: April–May 2006
- Studio: Johnny Cab Studios, The Tank
- Genre: Post-hardcore, experimental rock
- Length: 46:03
- Label: Equal Vision
- Producer: Bobby Darling

Fear Before The March of Flames chronology
Art Damage (2004)	The Always Open Mouth (2006)	Fear Before (2008)

Professional ratings
Review scores
Source	Rating
AbsolutePunk	(95%)
Alternative Press	4/5 stars
The A.V. Club	C
Drowned in Sound	8/10
Kerrang!	5/5 stars
Punknews.org	3.5/5 stars

The Always Open Mouth is the third full-length album by the post-hardcore band Fear Before the March of Flames, released in September 2006.

== Critical reception ==
Drowned in Sound called the album "a complex and matured experimental punk record that is both ravishingly beautiful and jaw-droppingly massive in one fouler-than-foul swoop." PopMatters wrote that "although a valiant effort, The Always Open Mouth is, more or less, an amalgam of separate ideas, none of which seem to pan out."

== Track listing ==
No.	Title	Length
1.	"Absolute Future"	1:06
2.	"Drowning the Old Hag"	2:54
3.	"Mouth"	3:32
4.	"Taking Cassandra to the End of the World Party"	2:44
5.	"Ten Seconds in Los Angeles"	2:20
6.	"The Waiting Makes Me Curious"	4:48
7.	"High as a Horse"	2:37
8.	"Dog Sized Bird"	2:14
9.	"Complete and Utter Confusion..."	2:19
10.	"...As a Result of Signals Being Crossed"	4:02
11.	"My (Fucking) Deer Hunter"	4:11
12.	"Lycanthropy"	3:07
13.	"A Brief Tutorial in Bachanalia"	4:36
14.	"A Gift for Fiction"	2:19
15.	"Absolute Past"	3:07

== Personnel ==
- David Marion – lead vocals
- Adam Fisher – lead guitar, clean vocals, keyboards, programming, piano, percussion
- Zachary Hutchings – rhythm guitar, percussion
- Michael Madruga – bass, backing vocals, percussion
- Brandon Proff – drums, percussion, programming, layout and design

Additional

- Jeremy Fisher – additional vocals on track 7
- Anthony Green – additional vocals on track 11
- Ryan Smith (Sterling Sound) – mastering
- Bobby Darling – producer
- Casey Bates – engineering and mixing
