= Crash of Rhinos =

English emo band

- Origin: Derby, England
- Genres: Emo, math rock, post-hardcore
- Years active: 2009–2014, 2025-present
- Labels: Big Scary Monsters, Topshelf Records, To Lose La Track, Storm Chasers Ltd, STIFF SLACK
- Members: Paul Beal; Jim Cork; Ian Draper; Richard J. "Biff" Birkin; Oli Craven
- Website: crashofrhinos.bandcamp.com

Crash of Rhinos are an English emo band from Derby. They were signed to Topshelf Records, To Lose La Track, and Big Scary Monsters.

== History ==
Prior to the formation of Crash of Rhinos, Jim Cork, Paul Beal, and Richard J. Birkin had been members of the Little Explorer; and Birkin, Cork, Draper and Craven had been in the Jesus Years.

Crash of Rhinos was formed in 2009. They released two full-length albums before disbanding in 2014. Oli Craven, Ian Draper, and Jim Cork later formed the trio Holding Patterns.

Crash of Rhinos reconvened in 2025 after Italian label Legno approached the band regarding a repress of their first album, Distal. The band agreed to play some shows, but vowed not to announce activities until they completed a new record. In March 2026, the band announced their reunion with their third studio album, Logbook, to be released 22 May, as well as shows in the UK and Italy that summer.

== Musical style ==
The band is known for an atypical lineup including two bassists, with all five members on vocals. Their rough punk style echoes earlier emo bands from the 1990s such as Jawbreaker and Burning Airlines.

== Band members ==
- Paul Beal (bass, vocals)
- Jim Cork (guitar, vocals)
- Ian Draper (bass, vocals)
- Richard J. "Biff" Birkin (guitar, vocals)
- Oli Craven (drums, vocals)

== Discography ==
Studio albums

- Distal (2011)
- Knots (2013)
- Logbook (2026)
