= Singin' to an Empty Chair =

Studio album by Ratboys
- Released: February 6, 2026
- Recorded: February 2025
- Studios: Driftless Cabin (Richland Center); Electrical Audio (Chicago); Rosebud (Evanston)
- Length: 50:51
- Label: New West
- Producers: Chris Walla; Ratboys

Ratboys chronology
| The Window (2023) | Singin' to an Empty Chair (2026) |

Singles from Singin' to an Empty Chair
- 1. "Light Night Mountains All That" Released: September 23, 2025; 2. "Anywhere" Released: October 28, 2025

Singin' to an Empty Chair is the sixth studio album from American rock band Ratboys, released on February 6, 2026 through New West Records.

== Recording ==
Singin' to an Empty Chair came together through a series of immerse recording experiences. To develop the album, the quartet decamped to a cabin in Richland Center, Wisconsin, where they workshopped the songs. To produce the album, the group reunited with producer Chris Walla, who had previously helmed the band's 2023 effort The Window. Walla emphasized emotional impact over music theory and arrangement. He shipped his own recording gear from his Norway home and met the band to record in Chicago. In February 2025, the band spent a week recording at the cabin in Wisconsin with Walla, who used the structure's naturally high ceilings to capture analog live takes.

Later, the band regrouped at Electrical Audio, the renowned Chicago space once home to Steve Albini. Their recording took an experimental approach, with the band substituting instruments for objects, and getting sounds in unconventional ways. For instance, the band created a Doppler shift by placing a radio on a spinning turntable. The band leaned into lively, bright pop-punk-style drum tones, sometimes speeding up recorded parts. Additional recording was tackled at Rosebud Studios in Evanston. For the album, the band moved to New West Records.

== Composition ==
Singer Julia Steiner's first experience in therapy shaped the album's direction, giving her tools to process a painful rift with a loved one. Guided by the "empty chair" technique, she practiced talking to an imagined version of that person, using those moments as a blueprint for a real conversation.

The sweeping six-minute single "Light Night Mountains All That" emerged from Steiner's attempt at a hyper-energetic folk song with eerie, pastoral imagery. The band spent six delirious hours untangling its unusual structure as she developed lyrics about a surreal rural vision quest in which days and nights blur together. "Anywhere" traces back to guitarist Dave Sagan's family dog, whose bouts of separation anxiety inspired the song's core feeling. "Burn It Down" explore collective frustration and the desire for transformative change. Written during the 2020 George Floyd protests, "Burn It Down" features a shared vocal between Steiner and bassist Sean Neumann and channels anger into a hopeful call for a more humane, community-driven future.

== Critical reception ==
Professional ratings
Aggregate scores
| Source | Rating |
|---|---|
| AnyDecentMusic? | 8.1/10 |
| Metacritic | 85/100 |
Review scores
| Source | Rating |
| AllMusic | 4/5 stars |
| DIY | 4.5/5 stars |
| Exclaim! | 8/10 |
| The Line of Best Fit | 8/10 |
| Paste | A− |
| Pitchfork | 8.4/10 |
| PopMatters | 8/10 |
| Record Collector | 4/5 stars |
| Slant Magazine | 4/5 stars |
| Under the Radar | 8/10 |

According to the review aggregator Metacritic, Singin' to an Empty Chair received "universal acclaim" based on a weighted average score of 85 out of 100 from 13 critic scores. AnyDecentMusic?, another aggregator, gave it an average of 8.1 out of 10 based on 15 critical reviews.

Ivy Nelson of Pitchfork called it "their most emotionally affecting and compositionally advanced songs to date". Tom Breihan from Stereogum was effusive, commenting that the album "is about as good as American indie rock gets. It's warm and heartfelt and exploratory and beautifully crafted." Alfie Sansom from Argus Far called "Penny in the Lake" a "charming country affair, witty and poignant in equal measures".

== Track listing ==
All lyrics are written by Julia Steiner; all music is composed by Steiner, Dave Sagan, Sean Neumann, and Marcus Nuccio.

Singin’ to an Empty Chair track listing
| No. | Title | Length |
|---|---|---|
| 1. | "Open Up" | 5:05 |
| 2. | "Know You Then" | 3:12 |
| 3. | "Light Night Mountains All That" | 5:58 |
| 4. | "Anywhere" | 3:03 |
| 5. | "Penny in the Lake" | 3:52 |
| 6. | "Strange Love" | 2:24 |
| 7. | "The World, So Madly" | 3:11 |
| 8. | "Just Want You to Know the Truth" | 8:29 |
| 9. | "What's Right?" | 5:15 |
| 10. | "Burn It Down" | 7:06 |
| 11. | "At Peace in the Hundred Acre Woods" | 3:16 |
| Total length: | | 50:51 |

== Personnel ==
Credits adapted from Bandcamp.

=== Ratboys ===
- Julia Steiner – lead vocals, electric guitar, acoustic guitar, production
- Dave Sagan – electric guitar, PocketPiano, production
- Sean Neumann – bass, synth bass, backing vocals, production
- Marcus Nuccio – drums, tambourine, shaker, synthesizers, production, art direction, layout, photography

=== Additional contributors ===
- Chris Walla – production, engineering, recording (all tracks), synthesizer (tracks 1, 7), tape loops (1, 8, 10), mixing (1, 8), piano (3, 8, 10)
- Elizabeth Jordan – cello (1)
- Andy Krull – pedal steel (8)
- Jenny Conlee – Hammond B-3 organ (11)
- Taylor Hales – engineering assistance
- Chris Shaw – mixing (except 1, 8)
- Heba Kadry – mastering

== Charts ==
Chart performance for Singin' to an Empty Chair
| Chart (2026) | Peak position |
|---|---|
| UK Album Downloads (Official Charts) | 34 |
| UK Americana Albums (Official Charts) | 25 |
| US Top Current Album Sales (Billboard) | 35 |
