= Pretend (band) =

American post-rock band

- Origin: Moorpark, California
- Genres: Post-rock; math rock
- Years active: 2004–present
- Labels: Topshelf Records; shelsmusic
- Members: Joel Morgan; Luke Palascak; Timothy "Tim" Ramirez; Mike Russell
- Website: pre-end.com

Pretend is an American post-rock band from Moorpark, California. It was founded in 2004 by Joel Morgan (drums), Luke Palascak (guitar, vocals), Timothy "Tim" Ramirez (guitar), and Mike Russell (bass). They became known on sites such as BlogSpot, Myspace, and PureVolume after releasing their first album, Bones in the Soil, Rust in the Oil, in 2009, later signing with Topshelf Records and releasing Tapestry'd Life in 2015.

== History ==
Pretend was formed in 2004 in Moorpark, California by Joel Morgan, Luke Palascak, and Timothy "Tim" Ramirez. All of the band members were self-taught with no formal musical training. In July 2009, they self-released their debut studio album, Bones in the Soil, Rust in the Oil. In 2010, it had a limited re-issue by shelsmusic with an alternate art and tracklist. Mike Russell later joined the band after acting as an engineer on the band's first album. From 2007 to 2012, the band spread through sites such as BlogSpot, Myspace, and PureVolume.

The band was not fully active again until October 2015, when they released their second album Tapestry'd Life after signing with Topshelf Records the month prior. They had come into contact with the label through word-of-mouth. The band's third album, Circular Ræsoning, was released in May 2017. In 2022, Morgan stated that the band was working on separate projects, but were still together.

== Influences and artistry ==
Pretend has been labeled as post-rock and math rock. Their unconventional and occasionally improvisational style of rock has been compared to Battles and was influenced by Dilute, American Football, and the sound and aesthetic of the Fender Telecaster guitar. Pretend is also known for their intricate compositions and their use of time signatures, even at times lacking it entirely in their music. Morgan's complex, jazz-like drumming has also been praised in addition to Palascak's delicate vocals. Morgan has said that he was inspired by the composition "In a Sentimental Mood" from the album Duke Ellington & John Coltrane alongside Steve Lamos from American Football and Rob Kellenberger from Colossal.

== Discography ==
=== Studio albums ===
Title	Details
Bones in the Soil, Rust in the Oil	Released: July 20, 2009; Label: Self-released; Formats: CD, digital download
Tapestry'd Life	Released: October 9, 2015; Label: Topshelf Records; Formats: LP, digital download
Circular Ræsoning	Released: May 19, 2017; Label: Self-released; Formats: LP, cassette, digital download
