= Sobs =

Singaporean indie rock band

- Origin: Singapore
- Genres: Indie rock; Indie pop
- Years active: 2017–present
- Labels: Middle Class Cigars; Topshelf Records
- Members: Celine Autumn; Jared Lim; Raphael Ong
- Website: sobs.bandcamp.com

Sobs is a Singaporean indie rock/pop band formed in 2017. The band comprises Celine Autumn on vocals, Jared Lim on lead guitar, and Raphael Ong on rhythm guitar. As a touring act, Sobs consists of Autumn, Lim, Ong, and auxiliary members such as Zhang Bo on bass, Soffi Peters on synths, and Shaun Khiu on drums. The band shares members and collaborators with fellow Singaporean indie rock bands Subsonic Eye and Blush. Sobs have often been cited as one of the most influential acts of Singapore's indie rock scene.

== Biography ==
In 2017, Autumn posted on the Singapore-based online music forum, SOFT, to look for someone to produce her project. Lim responded to her post, and the duo eventually formed Sobs. Autumn and Lim then wrote and recorded their first single, “Girl,” in the same year. In an interview in 2019, Lim recalled,

“Celine and I have been making music for some time, but it wasn’t until we wrote ‘Girl’ that things started getting serious. Everyone we sent it to really seemed to like it, especially Raphael, who asked to join the band within minutes of hearing the song.”

In June 2017, Sobs released its first EP titled Catflap, which featured the Autumn/Lim penned track, "Girl." The band made its live debut on Sled Productions X Decline in Singapore the following month. The band released its first album, Telltale Signs, in June 2018. In October 2018, Sobs opened for Snail Mail's show in Singapore. In January 2019, the band toured Japan. The band embarked on its first Southeast Asian tour alongside Subsonic Eye, which started from February to March 2019.

After four years of no new studio-recorded material, the band finally released its second album, Air Guitar, in October 2022 via Topshelf Records. Air Guitar received positive reviews. The band announced a 2023 US tour to promote the album, beginning in February. In early June 2023, the band toured Japan for the time since 2019.

== Members ==
=== Current members ===
- Celine Autumn – lead vocals
- Jared Lim – lead guitar
- Raphael Ong – rhythm guitar

=== Touring members ===
- Zhang Bo – bass guitar
- Soffi Peters – synthesizers
- Shaun Khiu – drums

== Discography ==
=== Singles ===
- "Telltale Signs" (released on June 1, 2018)
- "Air Guitar" b/w "Cool" (released on October 7, 2022)

=== EPs ===
- Catflap (released on June 23, 2017)

=== Albums ===
- Telltale Signs (released on June 22, 2018)
- Air Guitar (released on October 26, 2022)
