= Infinity Girl =

American alternative rock band

Infinity Girl was an American shoegazing band from Boston, Massachusetts, later based in Brooklyn, New York.

== History ==
Infinity Girl began in 2012, self-releasing its first full-length album titled Stop Being On My Side in May as well as an EP titled Just Like Lovers in December.

In 2015, Infinity Girl released its second full-length album titled Harm, its first on Topshelf Records.

Infinity Girl released "Somewhere Nice, Someday" on September 8, 2017, through Disposable America. It was the band's third and final record.

== Band members ==
- Nolan Eley (guitars, vocals)
- Kyle Oppenheimer (guitars, vocals)
- Mitchell Stewart (bass)
- Sebastian Modak (drums)

== Studio albums ==
- Stop Being On My Side (2012, self-released)
- Harm (2015, Topshelf)
- Somewhere Nice, Someday (2017, Disposable America)

EPs

- Just Like Lovers (2012, self-released)
