= Heavy Heavy Low Low =

American metalcore band

- Origin: San Jose, California, U.S.
- Genres: Metalcore, mathcore: sass
- Years active: 2004–2010; 2019–2026
- Labels: Twelve Gauge, Ferret
- Past members: Robert Smith; Danny Rankin; Andrew Fritter; Christopher Fritter; Ryan Madden; Matthew Caudle; Riley McTeague; Robbie Dalla; Sam Pura

Heavy Heavy Low Low was an American metalcore/mathcore band from San Jose, California.

== History ==
Formed in early 2004 in San Jose, California, Heavy Heavy Low Low played shows throughout the West Coast and developed a significant following, becoming known in the early 2000s screamo scene for their energetic stage presence.

They released their first EP Kids, Kids, Kids in 2004. The EP was recorded in a practice space in San Jose by Andy Kugler (Plans for Revenge).

Their first full-length release entitled Courtside Seats to the Greatest Fuck of All Time, was released by Twelve Gauge Records in 2005 and featured their single, "Inhalant Abuse Is Illegal And Can Be Fatal".

Following their first full-length, they self-released the ...Fuck It!? EP in 2005 and began touring beyond the west coast. This EP was recorded by Sam Pura in Pura's garage. It included their single, "Tell Shannon Her Crafts Are Ready". It also includes current singer Robbie Smith as well as previous singer Matthew Caudle.

They signed with New Weathermen Records, a division of Ferret Music, in mid-2006 and began work on their second full-length. In September 2006, Everything's Watched, Everyone's Watching was released, which featured several old songs re-done and remastered, along with numerous brand-new tracks. This album was recorded by Casey Bates and engineered by Tom Pfaeffle outside of Seattle. Extensive and constant touring in support of the record ensued.

In early 2007, their out-of-print EP ...Fuck It?! was re-released via Ferret Music and was limited to 1,000 copies. The release also features an exclusive B-side track titled "Short Term Exposure, Long Term Damage".

They released their third full-length album Turtle Nipple & The Toxic Shock on August 19, 2008. The album was recorded and produced by Sam Pura in Oakland, California. Choosing to record with at the time lesser-known Pura allowed the band to stretch out allotted label money and spend 2 months recording the album. The album was a significant shift from their past work and took on a more psychedelic and experimental sound.

In early 2009, the band left Ferret/New Weatherman Records and announced that they would re-sign with Twelve Gauge Records. They finally released Hospital Bomber EP in August 2010.

Their final EP, Hospital Bomber, has been compared to their last album regarding the coarser vocals of Robert Smith and a decidedly different musical style. The instruments for Hospital Bomber were all recorded live in-studio, instead of being recorded track-by-track. This recording technique gave the album a rawer sound than their previous albums. In a 2010 interview discussing Hospital Bomber, Robert Smith said the track "We Incompetent Sperm" was his favorite off the EP.

The band went on an indefinite hiatus in 2009 citing busy personal lives. Following the hiatus, members went on to play in various local bands.

In 2019, Heavy Heavy Low Low began posting on Instagram new artwork for the album for a vinyl reissue of Courtside Seats to the Greatest Fuck of All Time released by Twelve Gauge Records.

In July 2019, they announced they were reuniting to play a handful of shows in 2020 with the original lineup along the west coast. The tour was postponed due to the COVID-19 pandemic. They indicated that they still plan to play shows when possible.

In 2020 they uploaded a previously unreleased live in-studio EP, Steak, Tits, Football (I Hate Myself). The EP was released on cassette by Illuminate My Heart Records and Larry Records, as well as vinyl release by Silent Pendulum Records.

In 2021 Robbie Smith, Christopher and Andrew Fritter, along with Sam Pura formed Bone Cutter and released a self-titled EP through Twelve Gauge Records.

On April 20, 2025, the band released their first new album in 17 years, Pain Olympics.

Robbie Smith, lead vocalist, was featured on the hit show “Border Security: Australia’s Front Line” where he mentions being a member of the band.

== Touring ==
The band has toured throughout the US, as well as a tour in both Europe and Australia.

The band has toured extensively with Fear Before and the Fall of Troy. Other tourmates include: the Number Twelve Looks Like You, the Jonbenet, Ed Gein, Nights Like These, Ligeia, Murder by Death, Thursday, Horse the Band, So Many Dynamos, the End, Haste the Day and Poison the Well. They also took part in the 2007 Sounds of the Underground Tour alongside the likes of Gwar, Shadows Fall, Goatwhore and Every Time I Die. They toured with Foxy Shazam and Tera Melos in Fall of 2007. Their last US tour was the 2008 Stay Weird tour with Fear Before and Dr. Manhattan.

They announced a tour of Australia at the start of December 2010 with Australian band Totally Unicorn. They also played a few shows throughout California around this time. The Australian tour was their final tour and featured a four-piece line-up with Sam Pura filling-in for Danny Rankin on guitar. In 2012, band member Rob Smith was featured in an episode of Channel Seven's Border Security: Australia's Front Line in which he attempted to enter Australia as a compensated performer without the appropriate visa.

The band were set for a series of reunion shows throughout California in the summer of 2020, which were ultimately cancelled due to the COVID-19 pandemic.

In 2022, the band resumed their reunion show plans and performed a handful of dates on the eastern and western coast of the US, along with a string of shows throughout Texas in December with Duck Duck Goose and Executioner's Mask. These reunion shows featured the band's most well-known line-up of Robbie, Chris, Andrew, Dan, and Ryan.

== Members ==
=== Final lineup ===
- Robbie Smith – vocals
- Andrew Fritter – bass
- Christopher Fritter – drums
- Ryan "Chip" Madden – guitar
- Danny Rankin - guitar

=== Past ===
- Robbie Smith – vocals
- Riley McTeague – vocals (2004)
- Matthew Caudle – vocals (2004–2006)
- Robbie Dalla – guitar (2004–2005)
- Sam Pura – guitar (2009–2010)

== Discography ==
=== Studio albums ===
- Courtside Seats... (2005)
- Everything's Watched, Everyone's Watching (2006)
- Turtle Nipple and the Toxic Shock (2008)
- Pain Olympics (2025)

=== EPs ===
- Kids Kids Kids (2004)
- Fuck It?! (2005)
- Hospital Bomber (2010)
- Steak, Tits, Football (I Hate Myself) (recorded 2006, released 2019)
