= Ratboys =

American indie rock band

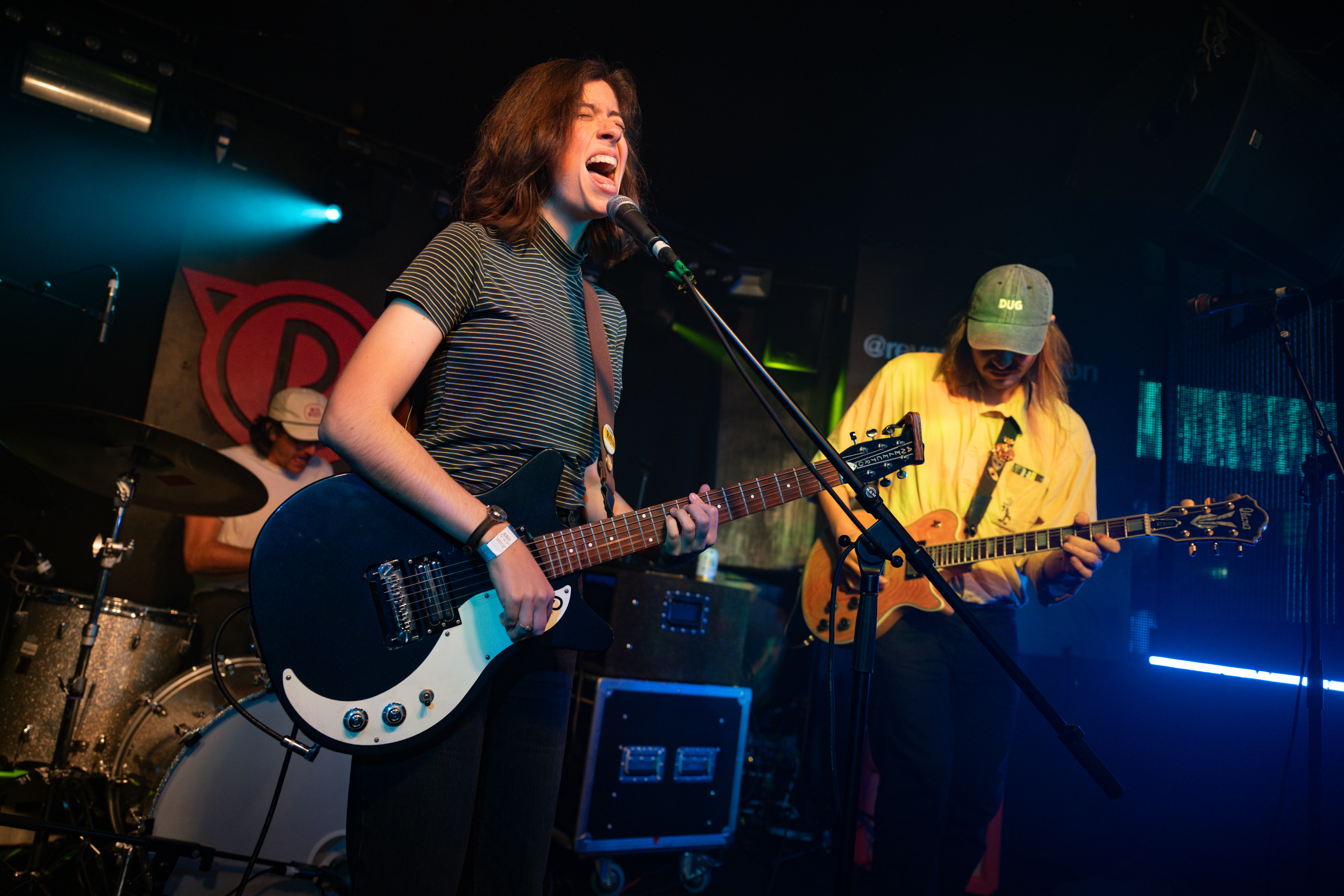
- Ratboys performing at The Mutations Festival, Brighton UK, November 7, 2025

Background information
- Origin: Chicago, Illinois
- Genres: Indie rock, post-country, indie folk, emo
- Years active: 2010–present
- Labels: Topshelf, Friend of Mine Records, New West Records
- Members: Julia Steiner; David Sagan; Marcus Nuccio; Sean Neumann
- Website: Official website

Ratboys are an American indie rock band from Chicago, Illinois, formed in 2010 by lead vocalist and rhythm guitarist Julia Steiner and her partner, lead guitarist Dave Sagan. As of 2020, the band consists of Steiner, Sagan, Marcus Nuccio (drums) and Sean Neumann (bass, backing vocals).

Steiner and Sagan formed the band during their time studying at the University of Notre Dame in South Bend, Indiana. The band relocated back to Sagan's hometown of Chicago in 2015 and released its debut album AOID that same year on Topshelf Records. Neumann became Ratboys' touring bassist in 2016 and Nuccio joined shortly thereafter in 2017; both officially joined the band in 2020. The band released its second album, GN, in 2017 and began gaining acclaim while touring with other rising acts like PUP, Soccer Mommy, Diet Cig, Wild Pink, and more. Rolling Stone named GN one of the "15 Great Albums You Probably Didn't Hear in 2017", while Uproxx rock critic Steven Hyden named the album one of the best of that year.

Ratboys released their third studio album, Printer's Devil, in 2020 to more critical praise. MTV called Printer's Devil "the best album of their career," while Pitchfork hailed the album's depth as "comforting and sobering all at once." A year later in 2021, they released their fourth studio album, Happy Birthday, Ratboy, named to celebrate the band's 10-year anniversary. This album featured the track "Go Outside", which was later featured in a Walmart ad campaign.

Their fifth studio album, The Window, was released on August 25, 2023, through Topshelf Records. It was recorded in Seattle with producer Chris Walla, formerly of Death Cab for Cutie. Chicago Tribune called the album "[T]he most confident, assured version of the Chicago band's music." The band's sixth album, Singin' to an Empty Chair, was released on February 6, 2026.

== History ==
=== 2010–2014: Formation and debut EP ===
Ratboys was formed in the fall of 2010 when Steiner and Sagan met each other at freshman orientation while studying at Notre Dame in South Bend, Indiana. The pair released their first piece of music together, putting out a cover of "Spiderweb", a song originally written by Champaign, Illinois band Easter. Two years later, Ratboys released their first EP titled Ratboy.

In May 2014, Ratboys released two songs, "Space Blows" and "Collected" and embarked on their first small tour with future bassist Sean Neumann's band Single Player (later known as Jupiter Styles) that summer in a few cities around the Midwest.

=== 2015–2018: AOID and GN ===
On June 9, 2015, Ratboys released their debut studio album via Topshelf Records titled AOID. The band embarked on their first full United States tours in support of the album, touring the United States and Europe with American bands like Pinegrove, Sorority Noise, Free Throw, Dowsing, and others.

In late 2016, Neumann officially joined the band. Sagan and Neumann knew each other from growing up in Chicago's southern suburbs and have played music together since their teens.

In June 2017, Ratboys released their second full-length album titled GN on Topshelf Records, which began to earn the band widespread media attention from outlets like NPR, Fader, MTV, and others. Rolling Stone named GN one of the "15 Great Albums You Probably Didn't Hear in 2017", writing that the "songs are full of shakily proud unburdenings and fun imagination."

Shortly after the release of GN, the band solidified its lineup by adding drummer Marcus Nuccio after he filled in for the band on drums during Ratboys' tour with his band Pet Symmetry.

Ratboys toured heavily in support of GN, touring for two years across the United States, Canada, Europe, and Japan. During that time, Ratboys toured with bands such as Soccer Mommy, Pup, Diet Cig, Vundabar, Wild Pink, Slingshot Dakota, Pet Symmetry, and more.

=== 2019–2022: Printer's Devil and Happy Birthday Ratboy ===
On November 12, 2019, Ratboys announced their third full-length album, Printer's Devil, which was released on February 28, 2020. Along with the announcement, the band released a new song titled "Alien with a Sleep Mask On", as well as a US tour in support of the album.

Steiner and Sagan wrote the bulk of Printer's Devil while staying in Louisville, Kentucky at Steiner's empty childhood home, which her parents were in the process of selling at the time, which heavily influenced the album's lyricism. The band recorded the album in Chicago, Illinois in the winter of 2018 at Decade Music Studios with producer and engineer Erik Rasmussen. It was also the first time the band's current lineup wrote and recorded new music all together.

Printer's Devil received critical praise upon its release. Pitchfork gave the album a 7.7 rating and wrote that Steiner's lyrics give "a wistful metaphor for growing up" that fill the listener with "innocuous signifiers of the passage of time that carry weight only in the rare moments we pause to consider them." MTV said Ratboys made "the best album of their career" and credited the band's newly found "big" sound to be credit to their experience playing in front of larger crowds with bands like Pup, while noting the addition of Neumann and Nuccio, who grew up with extensive backgrounds in Midwestern punk scenes alongside Sagan. In 2020, in light of the COVID-19 pandemic, Ratboys contributed to a benefit compilation titled The Song Is Coming from Inside the House. Organized by indie rock band Strange Ranger, proceeds from the 24-track album went to Groundswell's Rapid Response Fund, to support organizations led by women of color and transgender individuals.

On March 1, 2021, Ratboys released a new single titled "Go Outside" on Topshelf Records, which was then included on their studio album Happy Birthday, Ratboy later that year.

=== 2023–present: The Window and Singin' to an Empty Chair ===
The band spent much of 2024 opening for The Decemberists on a U.S. Tour. In September 2025, Ratboys signed to New West Records. The band released their first single under the label "Light Night Mountains All That" alongside a music video that same month. In October 2025, Ratboys announced their sixth album, Singin' to an Empty Chair, and shared its second single "Anywhere". In the lead-up to its release, the band also released the singles "What's Right?", "The World, So Madly" and "Penny in the Lake". The album was ultimately released on February 6, 2026, through New West Records. The band toured North America in support of the album between late February and mid-April 2026.

== Band members ==
Current members

- Julia Steiner – lead vocals, rhythm guitar (2010–present)
- David Sagan – lead guitar, pocket piano (2010–present), bass (2010–2014, 2017)
- Sean Neumann – bass, synth bass, backing vocals (2020–present; touring musician 2016–2020)
- Marcus Nuccio – drums, percussion, synthesizer (2020–present; touring musician 2017–2020)

Current touring musicians

- Andy Red – pedal steel (2026–present)

Former touring and session musicians

- William Lange – bass (2011–2016)
- Patrick Kennedy – drums (2014–2015)
- Nnamdi Ogbonnaya – drums (2015)
- Cody Owens – trumpet (2015)
- Jordan Parel – drums (2015–2017)
- Michael Politowicz – bass (2016)
- Danny Lyons – drums (2017)
- Evan Loritsch – drums, keyboards (2019–2021)
- Ian Paine-Jesam – drums (2020)

== Discography ==
Studio albums

- AOID (2015, Topshelf)
- GN (2017, Topshelf)
- Printer's Devil (2020, Topshelf)
- Happy Birthday, Ratboy (2021, Topshelf)
- The Window (2023, Topshelf)
- Singin' to an Empty Chair (2026, New West)

EPs

- Ratboy (2011, Swerp)
- Space Blows (2015, Topshelf)
- Split w/ Dowsing (2016, Topshelf)
- GL (2018, Topshelf)
- GL (8-Bit Version) (2018, Topshelf)
- Ratboys / T.V. NOT JANUARY Split (2024, Topshelf)

Other songs

- Covers Compilation for AFSP (2018, Comp For AFSP) – "I Don't Want To Live On The Moon (Sesame Street)"

Singles

| Year | Song | Peak chart positions | Album |
| Year | Song | US AAA | Album |
|---|---|---|---|
| 2016 | "Not Again" | — | Non-album singles |
| 2021 | "Go Outside" | — | Happy Birthday, Ratboy |
| 2023 | "Black Earth, WI" | — | The Window |
| 2025 | "Anywhere" | 19 | Singin' to an Empty Chair |
| 2025 | "Light Night Mountains All That" | — | Singin' to an Empty Chair |
| 2026 | "Penny In the Lake" | 28 | Singin' to an Empty Chair |
