= Gulfer =

Canadian emo band

- Origin: Montreal, Quebec, Canada
- Genres: Alternative rock; math rock; emo
- Years active: 2011–2024
- Labels: Topshelf Records (US), Royal Mountain Records (Canada)
- Members: Vincent Ford; David Mitchell; Joe Therriault; Julien Daoust
- Website: gulfer.bandcamp.com

Gulfer was a Canadian rock band from Montreal, Quebec, Canada. They formed in 2011 and were composed of David Mitchell (bass/vocals), Vincent Ford (vocals/guitar), Joe Therriault (guitar/vocals), and Julien Daoust (drums). Their sound makes use of odd time signatures, tapping, clean guitar tones, shifting tonal dynamics, and introspective lyrics. The band's music has similarities to This Town Needs Guns, Sport (France), I Love Your Lifestyle (Sweden), Tangled Hair, You Blew It!, and Dryjacket. The band has released three albums and several EPs and splits. In March 2018 they released their second studio album Dog Bless, in 2020 their third, self-titled album, and in 2024 their fourth and final album Third Wind. The band announced they would stop making music in May 2024 on their Instagram.

== Musical style ==
James Christopher Monger of AllMusic states that the band "combines emo-punk, math rock, grunge, and shoegaze elements with explosive musicianship and vulnerable lyrics."

== Discography ==
Studio albums

- What Gives (2015) via Big Scary Monsters (EU), Friend Of Mine Records (Japan) & Texas Is Funny Records (US)
- Dog Bless (2018) via Big Scary Monsters (EU), Friend Of Mine Records (Japan) & Topshelf Records (US)
- Gulfer (2020) via Royal Mountain Records (Canada) & Topshelf Records (US)
- Third Wind (2024) via Topshelf Records (US)

EPs

- Transcendals (2013) via Friend Of Mine Records
- LIGHTS OUT (2024) via Topshelf Records (US)

Splits

- Split with Fago.Sepia (2012)
- Splits (2013)
- Foureign Friends split (2014) via Enjoyment Records
- Dawgz split (2014) via Stack Your Roster
- Split with Del Paxton (2015) via Topshelf Records

Compilations

- Anthology (2020); a collection of early splits from 2012–2013 via Topshelf Records

Live albums

- Live in Japan (2020)

== Members ==
- Vincent Ford – lead vocals, guitar (2011–2024)
- David Mitchell – bass, vocals (2011–2024)
- Joe Therriault – guitar, backing vocals (2016–2024)
- Julien Daoust – drums (2016–2024)
- Caden Clinton – friend (2018–2024)

=== Former members ===
- Steven Whiteley – guitar, trumpet (2013–2015)
- Simon Maillé – drums (2011–2015)
