= By Surprise (band) =

American indie rock band

- Origin: Haddon Heights, New Jersey
- Genres: Emo, indie rock, punk rock
- Years active: 2007 – present
- Label: Topshelf Records
- Members: Patrick Gartland; Kenny Saraceni; Bobby John Wilcox; Devin Carr

By Surprise is an American indie rock band from Haddon Heights, New Jersey.

== History ==
By Surprise began in 2007 releasing an EP titled 478 via Kat Kat Records. In 2009, By Surprise released a 7" split with Hightide Hotel via Runner Up Records.

In 2011, By Surprise released their debut full-length album Mountain Smashers via Topshelf Records.

On January 12, 2013, By Surprise released another EP titled Criteria via Topshelf Records.

In 2015, Suburbia Records released a box split featuring a split between By Surprise and Broadcaster.

== Band members ==
- Patrick R. Gartland - Guitar, Vocals
- Daniel J. Saraceni - Bass, Vocals
- Robert J. Wilcox - Guitar, Vocals
- Devin P. Carr - Drums

== Discography ==
Studio albums

- Mountain Smashers (2011, Topshelf Records)

EPs

- By Surprise (2006, CD-R Self-Released)
- 478 (2008, CD-R Self-Released)
- 478 (Vinyl Reissue - 2012, Kat Kat Records)
- Criteria (2013, Topshelf Records)

Splits

- By Surprise/Hightide Hotel (2009, Runner Up Records)
- By Surprise/Broadcaster (2015, Suburbia Records)
- Aspiga/By Surprise (2016, Asian Man Records)

Cassettes

- 2006-2009 Discography (2009, Self-Released)
