= Topshelf Records =

American independent record label

- Founded: 2006
- Founder: Seth Decoteau, Kevin Duquette, Dan Sullivan
- Genre: Indie rock, emo, punk rock, post-rock
- Country of origin: United States
- Location: Portland, Oregon
- Official website: topshelfrecords.com

Topshelf Records is an American independent record label. Started in Peabody, Massachusetts, and formerly located in San Diego, California, the label is based in Portland, Oregon, as of 2022.

Topshelf Records has been profiled in the Pittsburgh City Paper, San Diego Reader, San Diego CityBeat, and Pitchfork.

== Current artists ==
- A Great Big Pile of Leaves
- Alfred.
- Another Michael
- Bellows
- Boyscott
- Clearance
- Del Paxton
- Elephant Gym
- Everyone Everywhere
- Field Mouse
- Giraffes? Giraffes!
- Gulfer
- Knifeplay
- Lite
- Mid-Air Thief
- Mouse on the Keys
- No Joy
- No Vacation
- Parannoul
- Queen of Jeans
- Ratboys
- Really From
- Sobs
- Standards
- Subsonic Eye
- Supernowhere
- Sweet Pill
- Thanya Iyer
- Toe
- Tricot
- Us and Us Only
- Weatherday

== Former artists ==
- Aeroplane, 1929
- Baker
- Boys Life
- Braid
- By Surprise
- Caravels
- Chamberlain
- The City on Film
- The Clippers
- CLIQUE
- Coping
- Crash of Rhinos
- CSTVT
- Cut Teeth
- Dangers
- Deer Leap
- Defeater
- Diamond Youth
- Doe
- Donovan Wolfington
- Duck. Little Brother, Duck!
- Ekko Astral
- Empire! Empire! (I Was a Lonely Estate)
- Enemies
- Feels Like July
- Flung
- Frameworks
- gobbinjr
- Grown Ups
- Happy Diving
- Have Mercy
- Heat
- Infinity Girl
- Inns
- Kind of Like Spitting
- Lion Club
- Mock Orange
- Moller
- Moving Mountains
- My Heart to Joy
- My Fictions
- Nai Harvest
- People Like You
- Pianos Become the Teeth
- Prawn
- Pretend
- Pswingset
- Queen Moo
- Rooftops
- Run, Walk
- Sirs
- Sixfinger
- Slingshot Dakota
- Solids
- Sorority Noise
- Special Explosion
- Stand Up Get Down
- Street Smart Cyclist
- Suis La Lune
- Sundials
- Tancred
- The Jazz June
- The Saddest Landscape
- The Velvet Teen
- The World Is a Beautiful Place & I Am No Longer Afraid to Die
- Us Against The Archers
- We Were Skeletons
- Wild Ones
- Wildhoney
- Yeyey
- You Blew It!
- You, Me, and Everyone We Know
