= List of As Friends Rust members =

Band members

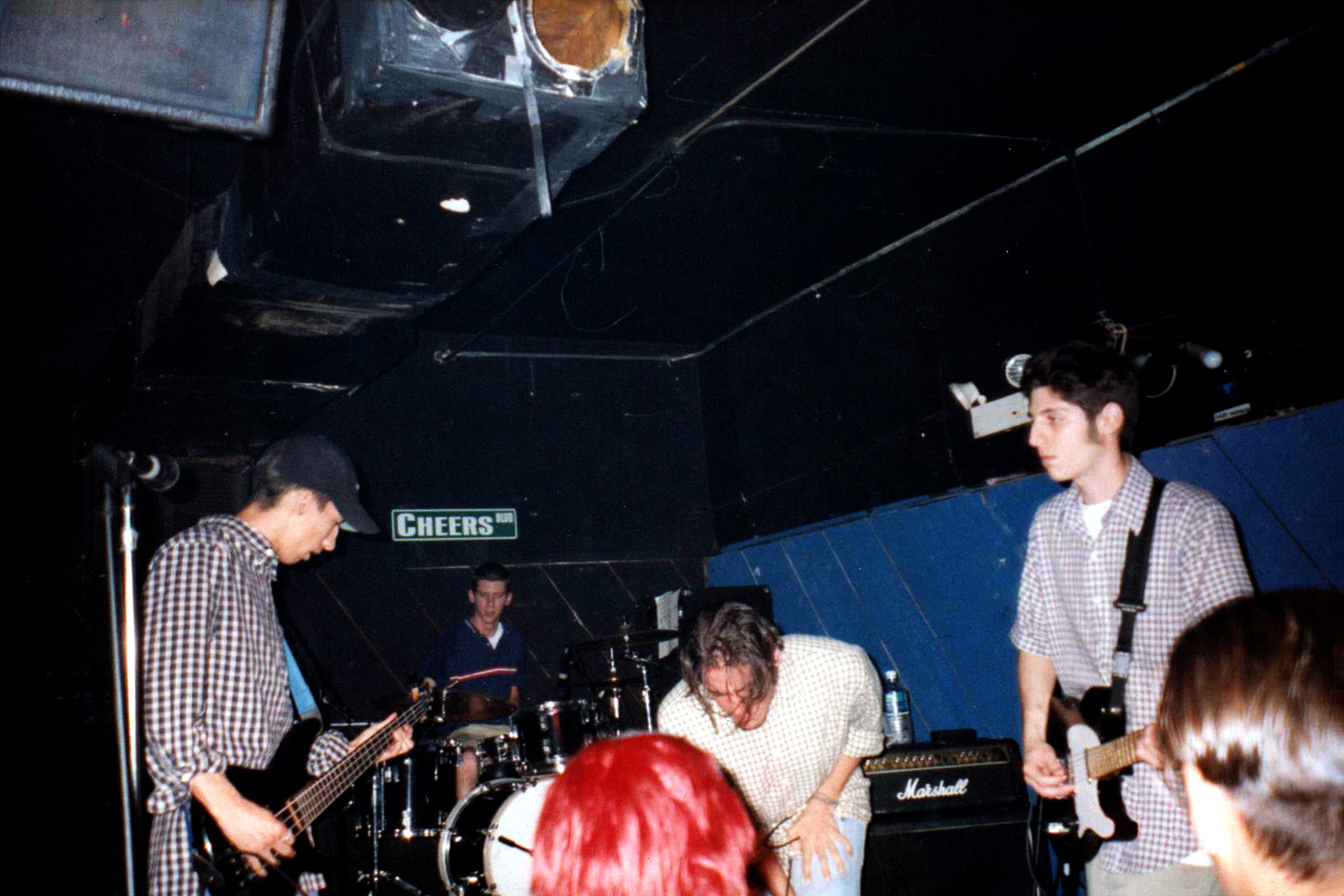
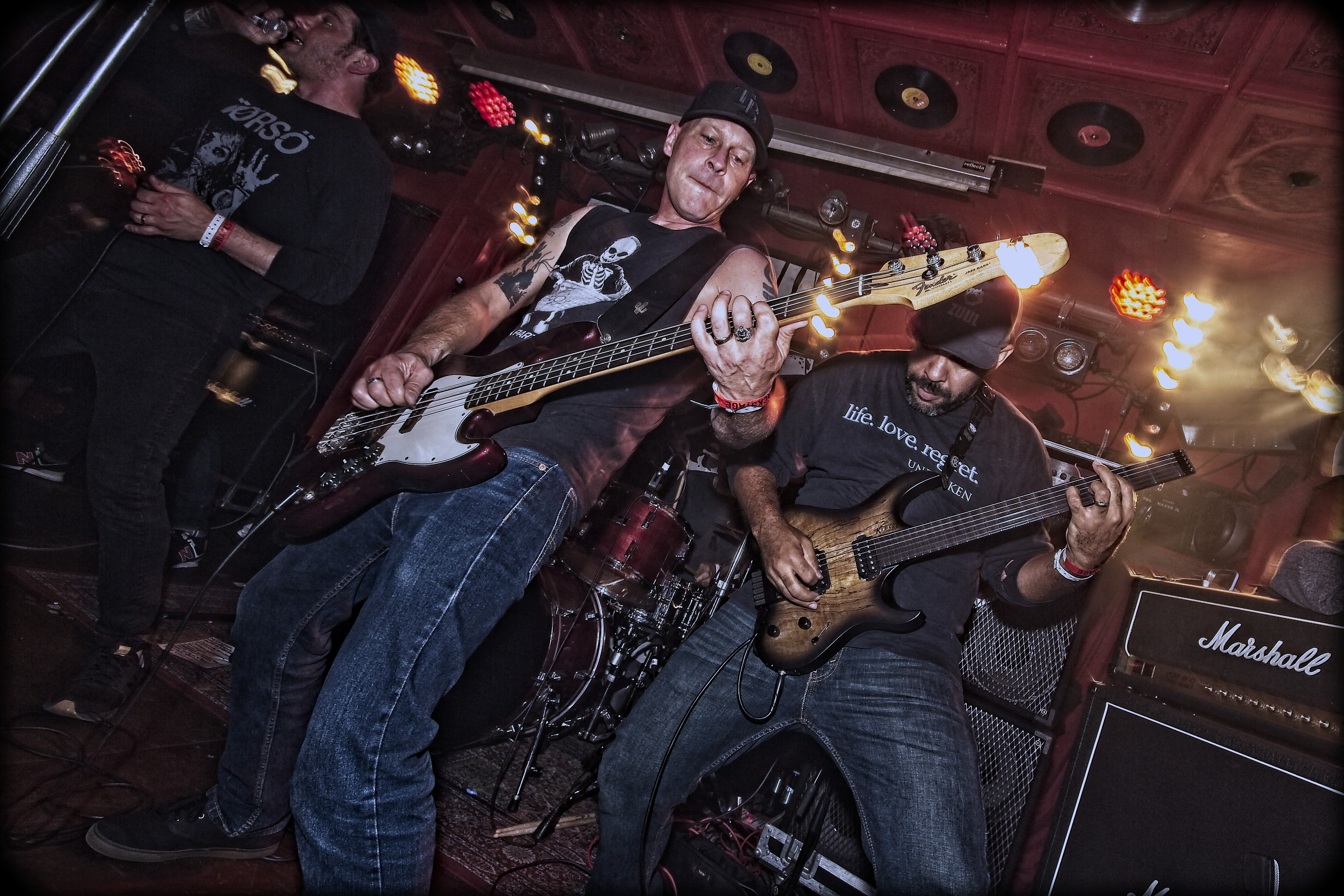
As Friends Rust performing at Cheers in Coconut Grove, Florida in 1996 (top) and at Molotow Musik Club in Hamburg, Germany in 2019 (bottom).

As Friends Rust is an American melodic hardcore band based in Gainesville, Florida. Formed in September 1996, the group originally consisted of lead vocalist Damien Moyal, guitarist Henry Olmino, bass guitarist Jeronimo Gomez, and drummer Matthew Crum. The band currently consists of Moyal (a consistent member except for a brief period in 2002), alongside drummer Timothy Kirkpatrick (who first joined in 1997), guitarists Joseph Simmons and James Glayat (both of whom first joined in 1998), and bassist Andrew Seward (since 2022).

== History ==
The original line-up of Moyal, Olmino, Gomez and Crum recorded a demo in November 1996, but failing to secure a record deal, parted ways in February 1997. In June 1997, Moyal reformed the band with new members, including guitarists Stephen Looker and Gordon Tarpley, drummer Jason Dooley, and bass guitarist Jason Black, while securing a deal with Belgian record label Good Life Recordings. By September 1997, Black had not taken up involvement and Timothy Kirkpatrick came in to replace Dooley. In March 1998, Joseph Simmons replaced Looker, and Kaleb Stewart joined as bass guitarist and backing vocalist. This line-up recorded material for the band's debut extended play, The Fists of Time (combined with 1996 recordings). Tarpley was then replaced by Peter Bartsocas in time for the EP's American promotional concert tour in June–July 1998, but the latter was replaced by James Glayat in October 1998, shortly before the band's first European tour. The line-up remained intact until August 2000, during which time the band released As Friends Rust / Discount, As Friends Rust, and Eleven Songs.

Inner tensions caused major line-up changes, culminating with Glayat, Kirkpatrick and, eventually, Stewart quitting in September 2000. Bartsocas, who happened to be visiting Europe while the band was on tour, filled in for Glayat during August–September 2000, while Stewart filled in as lead vocalist while Moyal was sick. After returning home, Moyal and Simmons reconstructed the band by recruiting guitarist and backing vocalist Christopher "Floyd" Beckham, bass guitarist Guillermo Amador, and drummer Alexander Vernon, with whom As Friends Rust recorded the single Morningleaver / This Is Me Hating You. In March 2001, Vernon was replaced by Zachary Swain, and in April 2001 Thomas Rankine replaced Amador. The new line-up recorded As Friends Rust's debut full-length album, Won, for Doghouse Records / Defiance Records and the extended play, A Young Trophy Band in the Parlance of Our Times, for Equal Vision Records, promoting the releases with extensive American, European and British tours (during which the live home video Camden Underworld, London – 16 November 2001 was filmed). By February 2002, tensions had again surfaced, which resulted with Moyal quitting the band at the peak of its popularity. In order to fulfill touring obligations, Beckham switched to lead vocals and Tarpley returned as guitarist, until lead vocalist Adam D'Zurilla was welcomed as Moyal's replacement in late March 2002. With D'Zurilla, As Friends Rust toured the United States, Canada, Europe and the United Kingdom several times, before Beckham quit the band in July 2002. After a final European tour as a four-piece, the remaining members of As Friends Rust announced that the band was changing name to Salem in September 2002.

As Friends Rust reunited in March 2008, with Moyal, Kirkpatrick, Simmons, Stewart, and Glayat reprising their 1998–2000 line-up, and the band embarked on a European and British tour in August 2008. For its Japanese tour in June 2014, supporting the compilation album Greatest Hits?, drummer Joshua Williams filled in for Kirkpatrick. Stewart was kicked out of the band in June 2019; he later died in March 2021. The band has since operated as a four-piece without a permanent bass guitarist. Chad Darby was called upon during the recording of the extended play Up from the Muck in 2020. For the band's performance at Furnace Fest in September 2022, Richard Thurston filled in for Kirkpatrick, while Michael Lipscomb performed bass guitar. In late 2022, bass guitarist Andrew Seward was recruited to record the band's second full-length album, Any Joy, and tour in promotion of the release throughout 2023. As Simmons was unable to tour Europe and the United Kingdom in September and October 2023, guitarist and backing vocalist Ryan Mahon was recruited to fill the spot. Mahon was called upon again, this time filling in as bass guitarist and backing vocalist, for the band's 2024 European tour.

== Members ==
=== Current ===
Image	Name	Years active	Instruments	Release contributions
	Damien Moyal	1996–1997; 1997–2002; 2008–present	lead vocals	all As Friends Rust releases
	Timothy Kirkpatrick	1997–2000; 2008–present	drums	The Fists of Time (1998); As Friends Rust / Discount (1998); As Friends Rust (1999); Eleven Songs (1999); Greatest Hits? (2014); The Porch Days: 1998 to 2000 (2015); Up from the Muck (2019); Any Joy (2023); Lightless (2024)
	Joseph Simmons	1998–2002; 2008–present	guitar	all As Friends Rust releases since The Fists of Time (1998)
	James Glayat	1998–2000; 2008–present	guitar; backing vocals (2019–present)	The Fists of Time (1998); As Friends Rust / Discount (1998); As Friends Rust (1999); Eleven Songs (1999); Greatest Hits? (2014); The Porch Days: 1998 to 2000 (2015); Up from the Muck (2019); Any Joy (2023); Lightless (2024)
	Andrew Seward	2022–present	bass guitar	Any Joy (2023); Lightless (2024)

=== Former ===
Image	Name	Years active	Instruments	Release contributions
	Henry Olmino	1996–1997	guitar	As Friends Rust demo (1996); The Fists of Time (1998); Eleven Songs (1999); Greatest Hits? (2014)
	Jeronimo Gomez	1996–1997	bass guitar	As Friends Rust demo (1996); The Fists of Time (1998); Eleven Songs (1999); Greatest Hits? (2014)
	Matthew Crum	1996–1997	drums	As Friends Rust demo (1996); The Fists of Time (1998); Eleven Songs (1999); Won (2001, guest); Greatest Hits? (2014)
	Stephen Looker	1997–1998	guitar	none
	Gordon Tarpley	1997–1998; 2002	guitar	The Fists of Time (1998); Eleven Songs (1999); Greatest Hits? (2014); The Porch Days: 1998 to 2000 (2015)
	Jason Dooley	1997	drums	none
	Jason Black	1997	bass guitar	none
	Kaleb Stewart	1998–2000; 2008–2019 (died 2021)	bass guitar; backing vocals; lead vocals (2000)	The Fists of Time (1998); As Friends Rust / Discount (1998); As Friends Rust (1999); Eleven Songs (1999); Greatest Hits? (2014); The Porch Days: 1998 to 2000 (2015)
	Peter Bartsocas	1998; 2000; 2015	guitar; bass guitar (2000); backing vocals	none
	Christopher Beckham	2000–2002	guitar; bass guitar (2000–2001); backing vocals; lead vocals (2002)	Morningleaver / This Is Me Hating You (2001); Won (2001); A Young Trophy Band in the Parlance of Our Times (2002); Camden Underworld, London – 16 November 2001 (2002); Greatest Hits? (2014)
	Guillermo Amador	2001	bass guitar	Morningleaver / This Is Me Hating You (2001)
	Alexander Vernon	2001	drums	Morningleaver / This Is Me Hating You (2001)
	Zachary Swain	2001–2002	drums	Won (2001); A Young Trophy Band in the Parlance of Our Times (2002); Camden Underworld, London – 16 November 2001 (2002); Greatest Hits? (2014)
	Thomas Rankine	2001–2002	bass guitar	Won (2001); A Young Trophy Band in the Parlance of Our Times (2002); Camden Underworld, London – 16 November 2001 (2002); Greatest Hits? (2014)
	Adam D'Zurilla	2002	lead vocals	none
	Joshua Williams	2014	drums	none
	Chad Darby	2019–2022	bass guitar	Up from the Muck (2019)
	Michael Lipscomb	2022	bass guitar	none
	Richard Thurston	2022	drums	none
	Ryan Mahon	2023; 2024	guitar (2023); bass guitar (2024); backing vocals	none

== Timeline ==
- ^{Note that the Studio album and EP bars represent the release dates, not the recording dates; membership often changed between the two events.}

== Lineups ==
Period	Members	Releases
September 1996 – February 1997	Damien Moyal – lead vocals; Henry Olmino – guitar; Jeronimo Gomez – bass guitar; Matthew Crum – drums	As Friends Rust demo (1996)
June – September 1997	Damien Moyal – lead vocals; Stephen Looker – guitar; Gordon Tarpley – guitar; Jason Black – bass guitar; Jason Dooley – drums	none
September 1997 – March 1998	Damien Moyal – lead vocals; Stephen Looker – guitar; Gordon Tarpley – guitar; Timothy Kirkpatrick – drums	none
March – April 1998	Damien Moyal – lead vocals; Gordon Tarpley – guitar; Timothy Kirkpatrick – drums; Joseph Simmons – guitar; Kaleb Stewart – bass guitar, backing vocals	The Fists of Time (1998)
April – October 1998	Damien Moyal – lead vocals; Timothy Kirkpatrick – drums; Joseph Simmons – guitar; Kaleb Stewart – bass guitar, backing vocals; Peter Bartsocas – guitar, backing vocals	none
October 1998 – August 2000	Damien Moyal – lead vocals; Timothy Kirkpatrick – drums; Joseph Simmons – guitar; Kaleb Stewart – bass guitar, backing vocals; James Glayat – guitar	As Friends Rust / Discount (1998); As Friends Rust (1999)
August – September 2000	Damien Moyal – lead vocals; Timothy Kirkpatrick – drums; Joseph Simmons – guitar; Kaleb Stewart – bass guitar, backing vocals; Peter Bartsocas – guitar, backing vocals	none
September 2000	Timothy Kirkpatrick – drums; Joseph Simmons – guitar; Kaleb Stewart – lead vocals; Peter Bartsocas – bass guitar, backing vocals	none
September 2000 – January 2001	Damien Moyal – lead vocals; Joseph Simmons – guitar; Christopher Beckham – bass guitar, backing vocals	none
January – February 2001	Damien Moyal – lead vocals; Joseph Simmons – guitar; Christopher Beckham – guitar, backing vocals; Guillermo Amador – bass guitar	none
February – March 2001	Damien Moyal – lead vocals; Joseph Simmons – guitar; Christopher Beckham – guitar, backing vocals; Guillermo Amador – bass guitar; Alexander Vernon – drums	Morningleaver / This Is Me Hating You (2001)
March – April 2001	Damien Moyal – lead vocals; Joseph Simmons – guitar; Christopher Beckham – guitar, backing vocals; Guillermo Amador – bass guitar; Zachary Swain – drums	none
April 2001 – February 2002	Damien Moyal – lead vocals; Joseph Simmons – guitar; Christopher Beckham – guitar, backing vocals; Zachary Swain – drums; Thomas Rankine – bass guitar	Won (2001); A Young Trophy Band in the Parlance of Our Times (2002); Camden Underworld, London – 16 November 2001 (2002)
February – March 2002	Joseph Simmons – guitar; Christopher Beckham – lead vocals; Zachary Swain – drums; Thomas Rankine – bass guitar; Gordon Tarpley – guitar	none
March – July 2002	Joseph Simmons – guitar; Christopher Beckham – guitar, backing vocals; Zachary Swain – drums; Thomas Rankine – bass guitar; Adam D'Zurilla – lead vocals	none
July – September 2002	Joseph Simmons – guitar; Zachary Swain – drums; Thomas Rankine – bass guitar; Adam D'Zurilla – lead vocals	none
On hiatus 2002 to 2008
March 2008 – June 2014	Damien Moyal – lead vocals; Timothy Kirkpatrick – drums; Joseph Simmons – guitar; Kaleb Stewart – bass guitar, backing vocals; James Glayat – guitar	none
June 2014	Damien Moyal – lead vocals; Joseph Simmons – guitar; Kaleb Stewart – bass guitar, backing vocals; James Glayat – guitar; Joshua Williams – drums	none
June 2014 – April 2015	Damien Moyal – lead vocals; Timothy Kirkpatrick – drums; Joseph Simmons – guitar; Kaleb Stewart – bass guitar, backing vocals; James Glayat – guitar	none
April 2015	Damien Moyal – lead vocals; Timothy Kirkpatrick – drums; Joseph Simmons – guitar; Kaleb Stewart – bass guitar, backing vocals; James Glayat – guitar; Peter Bartsocas – guitar	none
April 2015 – June 2019	Damien Moyal – lead vocals; Timothy Kirkpatrick – drums; Joseph Simmons – guitar; Kaleb Stewart – bass guitar, backing vocals; James Glayat – guitar	none
June 2019 – September 2022	Damien Moyal – lead vocals; Timothy Kirkpatrick – drums; Joseph Simmons – guitar; James Glayat – guitar, backing vocals; Chad Darby – bass guitar	Up from the Muck (2019)
September 2022	Damien Moyal – lead vocals; Joseph Simmons – guitar; James Glayat – guitar, backing vocals; Michael Lipscomb – bass guitar; Richard Thurston – drums	none
September 2022 – September 2023	Damien Moyal – lead vocals; Timothy Kirkpatrick – drums; Joseph Simmons – guitar; James Glayat – guitar, backing vocals; Andrew Seward – bass guitar	Any Joy (2023)
September – October 2023	Damien Moyal – lead vocals; Timothy Kirkpatrick – drums; James Glayat – guitar, backing vocals; Andrew Seward – bass guitar; Ryan Mahon – guitar, backing vocals	none
October 2023 – November 2024	Damien Moyal – lead vocals; Timothy Kirkpatrick – drums; Joseph Simmons – guitar; James Glayat – guitar, backing vocals; Andrew Seward – bass guitar	Lightless (2024)
November 2024	Damien Moyal – lead vocals; Timothy Kirkpatrick – drums; Joseph Simmons – guitar; James Glayat – guitar, backing vocals; Ryan Mahon – bass guitar, backing vocals	none
November 2024 – present	Damien Moyal – lead vocals; Timothy Kirkpatrick – drums; Joseph Simmons – guitar; James Glayat – guitar, backing vocals; Andrew Seward – bass guitar	none
