= As Friends Rust discography =

Band discography

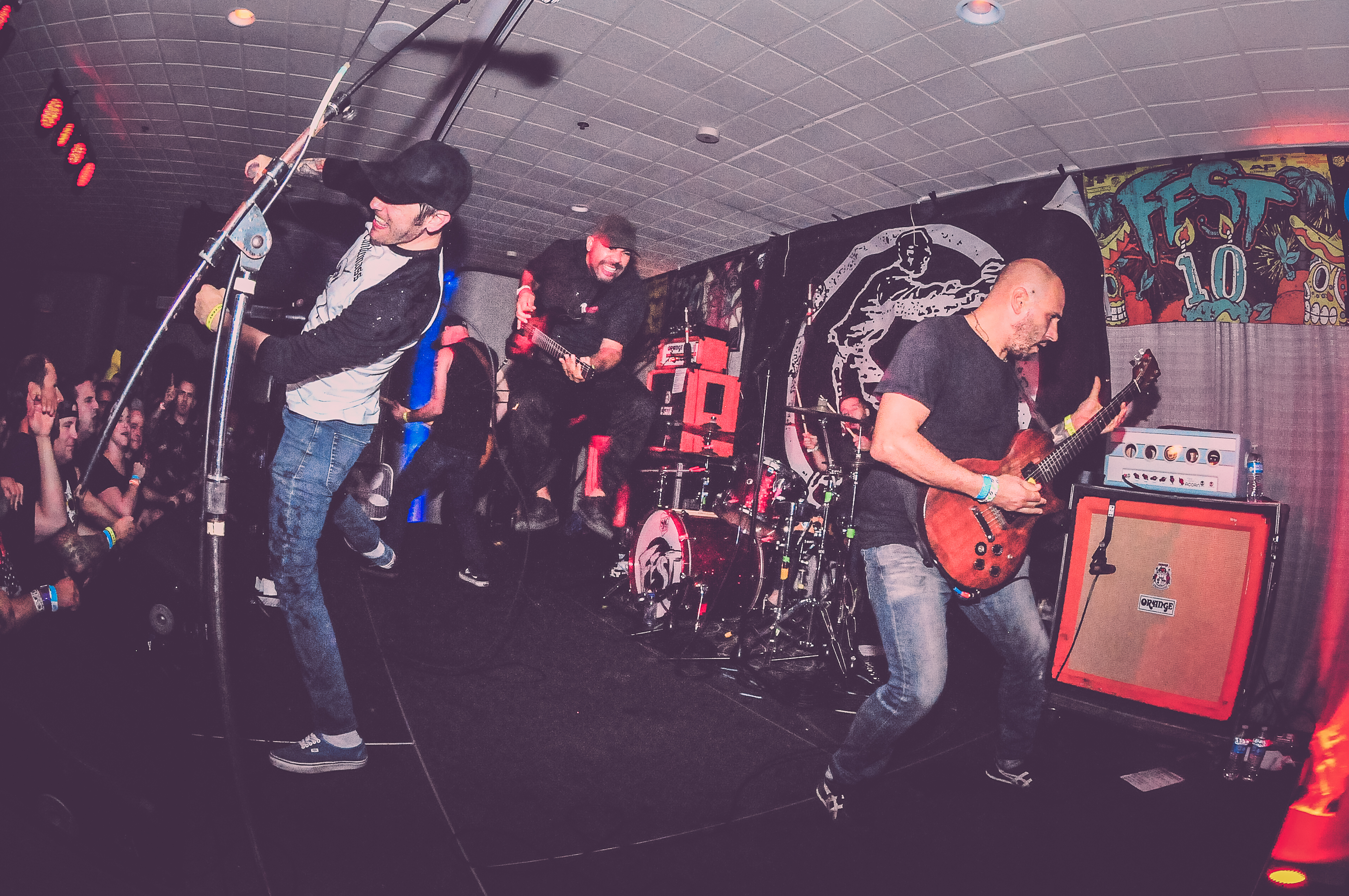
- As Friends Rust in 2015
- Studio albums: 2
- EPs: 4
- Compilation albums: 3
- Singles: 5
- Video albums: 1
- Music videos: 3
- Demos: 1

The discography of American melodic hardcore band As Friends Rust includes two studio albums, three compilation albums, four extended plays, five singles, one live video album, and three music videos. The original line-up recorded a demo tape in November 1996, but failing to secure a record deal, the band parted ways in February 1997. After reforming later that same year, but with a new line-up, the band recorded one new song and combined it with some of the demo's songs to create its debut EP, The Fists of Time, for Belgium's Good Life Recordings in July 1998. In December 1998, As Friends Rust released a split with Discount, also on Good Life.

The band signed with American record label Doghouse Records and released the eponymous EP, As Friends Rust, in September 1999 (co-released by Good Life in Europe). This was followed by a series of reissues of its early material, starting with Eleven Songs on Japan's Howling Bull Entertainment in October 1999, The Fists of Time: An Anthology of Short Fiction and Non-Fiction on Doghouse in June 2000, and Eleven Songs on England's Golf Records in October 2001.

In March 2001, Doghouse issued the single Morningleaver / This Is Me Hating You as part of the Doghouse Fan Series. In October 2001, As Friends Rust's debut full-length album, Won, was released by Doghouse / Defiance / Howling Bull. The band next signed with American record label Equal Vision Records and released the EP A Young Trophy Band in the Parlance of Our Times in May 2002. A concert during the Won tour with Strike Anywhere was filmed and released in December 2002 as Camden Underworld, London – 16 November 2001 by Punkervision. After considerable line-up changes, the band changed name to Salem in September 2002.

As Friends Rust reunited in 2008. In 2014 and 2015, the band issued the compilation albums Greatest Hits? (on Cosmic Note, D'Kolektif and Shield Recordings), and The Porch Days: 1998 to 2000 (on Demons Run Amok Entertainment). In 2020, As Friends Rust recorded and released its first new material in eighteen years with the EP Up from the Muck, which was released on Unity Worldwide Records in July 2020 and Stick to the Core in May 2023. On June 22, 2023, the band released the single "Positive Mental Platitude", the first song from its sophomore full-length album, Any Joy, originally scheduled for release on August 18, 2023, but delayed to September 8, 2023, via End Hits Records. The second single from Any Joy, "Final Form", was released on July 20, 2023, followed by "No Gods, Some Masters" on August 17, 2023. On October 18, 2024, the band released the single "Lost in Space," followed by "Skimming" on November 1, 2024, both from the extended play Lightless, released via End Hits Records on November 1, 2024.

== Albums ==
=== Studio albums ===
Title	Album details
Won	Released: October 23, 2001; Label: Doghouse / Defiance / Howling Bull
Any Joy	Released: September 8, 2023; Label: End Hits

=== Compilation albums ===
Title	Album details
Eleven Songs	Released: October 5, 1999; Label: Howling Bull / Golf
Greatest Hits?	Released: June 4, 2014; Label: Cosmic Note / D'Kolektif / Shield
The Porch Days: 1998 to 2000	Released: May 22, 2015; Label: Demons Run Amok

== Extended plays ==
Title	EP details
The Fists of Time	Released: July 13, 1998; Label: Good Life / Doghouse
As Friends Rust	Released: September 17, 1999; Label: Doghouse / Good Life
A Young Trophy Band in the Parlance of Our Times	Released: May 28, 2002; Label: Equal Vision / Defiance
Up from the Muck	Released: July 3, 2020; Label: Unity Worldwide / Stick to the Core
Lightless	Released: November 1, 2024; Label: End Hits

== Singles ==
Title	Single details
As Friends Rust / Discount (with Discount)	Released: December 1998; Label: Good Life
Morningleaver / This Is Me Hating You (Doghouse Fan Series)	Released: March 2001; Label: Doghouse
"Positive Mental Platitude"	Released: June 22, 2023; Label: End Hits
"Final Form"	Released: July 20, 2023; Label: End Hits
"No Gods, Some Masters"	Released: August 17, 2023; Label: End Hits
"Lost in Space"	Released: October 18, 2024; Label: End Hits
"Skimming"	Released: November 1, 2024; Label: End Hits

== Videos ==
=== Video albums ===
Title	Album details
Camden Underworld, London – 16 November 2001 (with Strike Anywhere)	Released: December 17, 2002; Label: Punkervision

=== Music videos ===
Title	Date	Director	Album
"Positive Mental Platitude"	June 22, 2023	Seppe Dausi	Any Joy
"Final Form"	July 20, 2023	Nathaniel Shannon / Damien Moyal	Any Joy
"No Gods, Some Masters"	August 17, 2023	Damien Moyal	Any Joy
"Lost in Space"	October 18, 2024	Seppe Dausi	Lightless
"Skimming"	November 1, 2024	Damien Moyal	Lightless

== Demos ==
Title	Demo details
As Friends Rust	Released: November 1996; Label: self-released

== Other appearances ==
Song	Year	Album	Label
"Home Is Where the Heart Aches"	1998	Initial Records Catalog Sampler	Initial
"Home Is Where the Heart Aches"	1999	Initial Extreme Music Sampler	Initial
"Coffee Black"	1999	Budget Sampler	Eulogy
"Half Friend Town"	1999	Doghouse Sixty	Doghouse
"Half Friend Town"	2000	Introduce You to Your New Favorite Bands: Summer Sampler	Big Wheel Recreation
"Half Friend Town"	2000	Goodlife 4	Good Life
"Half Friend Town"	2000	Lumberjack Distribution - Fall Sampler 2000	Lumberjack
"Half Friend Town"	2000	Rats in the Hallway #14	Rats in the Hallway
"Half Friend Town"	2001	Another Round of Golf Vol. 3	Golf
"Morningleaver"	2001	Loudkill: The Snowboard Movie Revival	Howling Bull
"Austin, We Have a Problem"	2001	Ox-Compilation #45	Ox-Fanzine
"We on Some Next Level Shit"	2001	All Areas Vol. 22	Visions
"Won't Be the First Time"	2001	Doghouse Records Sampler	Doghouse
"Won't Be the First Time"	2001	News (S) Hit's !!! März' 02	Funtomias
"Won't Be the First Time"	2002	Make Like a Tree And Leave	Big Wheel Recreation
"Won't Be the First Time" / "More Than Just Music, It's a Hairstyle"	2002	Summer Sampler 2002	Equal Vision
"More Than Just Music, It's a Hairstyle"	2002	Summer Sampler 2002	Defiance
"More Than Just Music, It's a Hairstyle"	2002	Crackpot Distro Compilation Vol. 3	Crackpot
"More Than Just Music, It's a Hairstyle"	2002	The Broken Rule Affair	Kablio
"Born With a Silver Spoon Up Your Ass"	2002	Today's Best Music	Ποπ + Ροκ
"Half Friend Town"	2015	10 Year Anniversary	Shield
"Up from the Muck"	2020	Peace Is Earned: A Benefit Compilation for Black Lives Matter	Lore
"Laughing Out Loud (Quarantine Acoustic Version)"	2021	Strength Thru Unity: A Conne Island Benefit Compilation	Unity Worldwide
