= Greatest Hits? =

Greatest hits album by As Friends Rust
- Released: June 4, 2014 (Japan); December 27, 2014 (Indonesia) April 29, 2015 (Europe)
- Recorded: November 19, 1996 – February 2002
- Studio: Wisner Productions, Davie, Florida; Landmark Productions & Recording Studios, Fort Lauderdale, Florida; Goldentone Studios, Gainesville, Florida
- Genre: Melodic hardcore; emotional hardcore; punk rock
- Length: 48:52 (Asia); 43:19 (Europe)
- Label: Cosmic Note; D'Kolektif; Shield
- Producer: James Paul Wisner; Rob McGregor; As Friends Rust; Damien Moyal
- Compiler: Damien Moyal

As Friends Rust chronology
Camden Underworld, London – 16 November 2001 (2002)	Greatest Hits? (2014)	The Porch Days: 1998 to 2000 (2015)

Greatest Hits? is a compilation album by American melodic hardcore band As Friends Rust. It was originally released on compact disc by Japanese record label Cosmic Note on June 4, 2014. Indonesian record label D'Kolektif released the compilation on compact cassette on December 27, 2014. Dutch record label Shield Recordings re-issued the compact disc and issued a 12-inch vinyl and digital editions for the European market on April 29, 2015, though this version omitted three songs due to vinyl time constraints.

The release compiles a selection of As Friends Rust recordings, hand-picked by vocalist Damien Moyal, from each of the band's main releases, spanning from the demo tape in 1996 to the initial break-up in 2002. The previously released material contained within had appeared on The Fists of Time and the split with Discount (both 1998), As Friends Rust (1999), Won (2001) and A Young Trophy Band in the Parlance of Our Times (2002). The content showcases nearly every member the band has had over the years, including Moyal; guitarists Henry Olmino, Gordon Tarpley, Joseph Simmons, James Glayat and Christopher "Floyd" Beckham; bass guitarists Jeronimo Gomez, Kaleb Stewart and Thomas Rankine; and drummers Matthew Crum, Timothy Kirkpatrick and Zachary Swain.

In promotion of Greatest Hits?, As Friends Rust toured Japan in 2014, accompanied by Japanese hardcore groups Endzweck and Noy; it marked the band's first live performances since 2008. As Friends Rust played additional shows in 2015 and 2019 supporting the release, including performances at notable festivals like Groezrock in Meerhout, Belgium, Booze Cruise in Hamburg, Germany, and The Fest in Gainesville, Florida.

== Background and content ==
As Friends Rust vocalist Damien Moyal toured Japan in August–September 2013 with his other band Culture, during which he met Japanese hardcore acts Endzweck and Noy. Upon returning home to the United States, plans were quickly made for As Friends Rust to headline its own Japanese tour in 2014, supported by Endzweck and Noy. Moyal then conceived Greatest Hits? as an exclusive release for the Japanese market.

The material compiled for Greatest Hits? was recorded during six different recording sessions, spanning a period of seven years, from 1996 to 2002. The recordings showcase nearly every member the band has had over the years, including Moyal; guitarists Henry Olmino, Gordon Tarpley, Joseph Simmons, James Glayat and Christopher Beckham; bass guitarists Jeronimo Gomez, Kaleb Stewart and Thomas Rankine; and drummers Matthew Crum, Timothy Kirkpatrick and Zachary Swain. Notable exclusions are guitarists Stephen Looker and Peter Bartsocas (who did not record with the band), bass guitarist Guillermo Amador and drummer Alexander Vernon (both on whom recorded demos with As Friends Rust that were not included on the compilation) and vocalist Adam D'Zurilla (who did not record with the band).

"Encante", "When People Resort to Name Calling" and "Ruffian", were recorded from November 19–22, 1996 at Wisner Productions in Davie, Florida with producer James Paul Wisner. The songs featured the band's original line-up: vocalist Moyal, guitarist Henry Olmino, bass guitarist Jeronimo Gomez and drummer Matthew Crum. Some of the songs had appeared on the band's demo tape, circulated to record labels in late 1996, and all three were later used on As Friends Rust's debut extended play The Fists of Time, released by Good Life Recordings in 1998 and Doghouse Records in 2000.

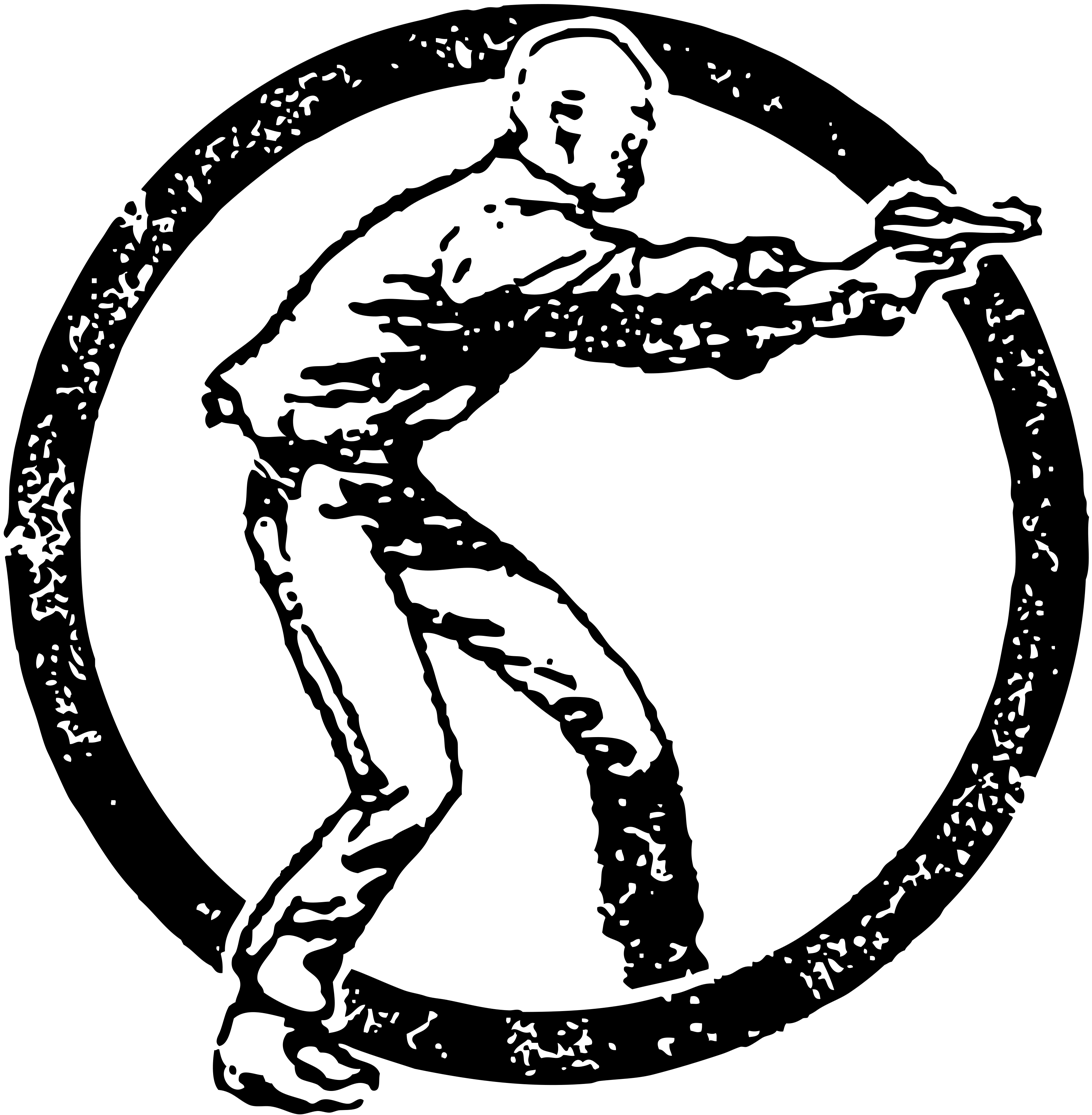
As Friends Rust's "guy with gun" logo, discovered and adapted by Moyal in 1998. The emblem was first used on the As Friends Rust / Discount split and has since appeared on the majority of the band's merchandise, including the cover art of Greatest Hits?.

"Home Is Where the Heart Aches" was recorded in late March 1998 at Goldentone Studios in Gainesville, Florida with producer Rob McGregor. The song features the band's reformed line-up with lead vocalist Moyal, guitarists Joseph Simmons and Gordon Tarpley, bass guitarist and backing vocalist Kaleb Stewart, and drummer Timothy Kirkpatrick. Three members of Hot Water Music; Chuck Ragan, George Rebelo and Chris Wollard; as well as McGregor and all members of As Friends Rust, provided backup vocals on the song. "Home Is Where the Heart Aches" first appeared on The Fists of Time in 1998 and was also used on the split with Discount and a Various Artists compilations by Initial Records.

"Half Friend Town", "Like Strings (Spell It with a K)", "Fire on 8th and 3rd", "Coffee Black" "Scapegoat Wets the Whistle" and "Operation" were recorded on May 9, 1999, at Goldentone Studios, co-produced by Rob McGregor and As Friends Rust. The songs feature lead vocalist Moyal, guitarists Simmons and James Glayat, bass guitarist and backing vocalist Stewart and drummer Kirkpatrick. "Operation" is a Circle Jerks cover. All six songs originally appeared on the band's sophomore extended play As Friends Rust, released by Good Life Recordings and Doghouse Records in 1999.

"The First Song on the Tape You Make Her" was recorded in October 1998 at Goldentone Studios with producer Rob McGregor. The song features lead vocalist Moyal, guitarists Simmons and Glayat, bass guitarist and backing vocalist Stewart and drummer Kirkpatrick. McGregor and Keith Welsh provided backup vocals on the song. "The First Song on the Tape You Make Her" first appeared on As Friends Rust's split with Discount, released by Good Life Recordings in 1998, and later appeared on Doghouse Records' reissue of The Fists of Time in 2000.

"Perfect Stranglers", "We on Some Next Level Shit", "Laughing Out Loud" and "Won't Be the First Time" were recorded in July 2001 at Wisner Productions in Davie, Florida and Landmark Productions & Recording Studios in Fort Lauderdale, Florida with producer James Paul Wisner. The songs feature the band's third creative line-up with lead vocalist Moyal, guitarist Simmons, guitarist and backing vocalist Christopher "Floyd" Beckham, bass guitarist Thomas Rankine and drummer Zachary Swain. Wisner and Chad Neptune provided backup vocals on the songs. All four songs originally appeared on the band's debut full-length album Won, released by Doghouse Records, Defiance Records and Howling Bull Entertainment in 2001.

"Born With a Silver Spoon Up Your Ass" and "More Than Just Music, It's a Hairstyle" were recorded in February 2002 at Wisner Productions, co-produced James Paul Wisner, As Friends Rust and Moyal. The songs feature lead and backing vocalist Moyal, guitarists Simmons and Beckham, bass guitarist Rankine and drummer Swain. Both songs originally appeared on the band's third extended play A Young Trophy Band in the Parlance of Our Times, released by Equal Vision Records and Defiance Records in 2002.

== Release, packaging and promotion ==
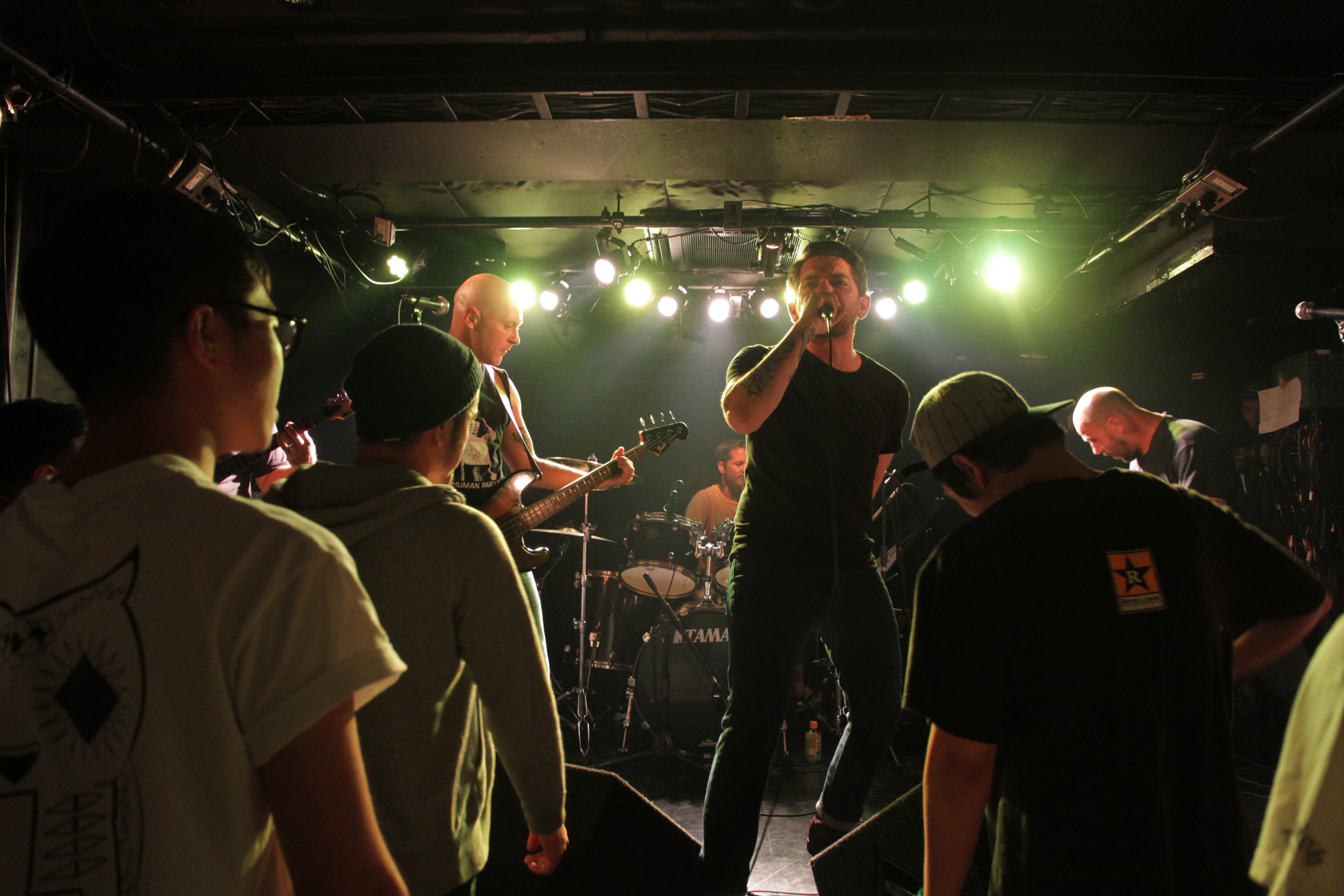
As Friends Rust performing at Shinjuku Nine Spices in Tokyo, Japan on June 12, 2014, in promotion of Greatest Hits?. One of only four shows played with drummer Joshua Williams as part of the Japan Tour 2014.

The artwork and layout for Greatest Hits? were designed by Moyal. It prominently features As Friends Rust's recognizable "guy with gun" logo; an illustration which Moyal had found on a wall while walking through an alleyway in Chinatown, Boston, Massachusetts in early July 1998, while on tour with Discount. Nicholas Forneris, who had previously provided photographs for As Friends Rust and Won, also contributed pictures to the release.

Japanese record label Cosmic Note released Greatest Hits? on compact disc (housed in a jewel case) on June 4, 2014, a week prior to the start of As Friends Rust's Japan Tour 2014. Accompanied by Japanese hardcore bands Endzweck, Noy and Nervous Light of Sunday, As Friends Rust played shows in Tokyo, Sendai and Kyoto, from June 12–15, 2014. Kirkpatrick was unable to tour and was temporarily replaced by former Culture drummer Joshua Williams on all Japanese dates. On December 27, 2014, Indonesian record label D'Kolektif released Greatest Hits? on compact cassette with a different layout.

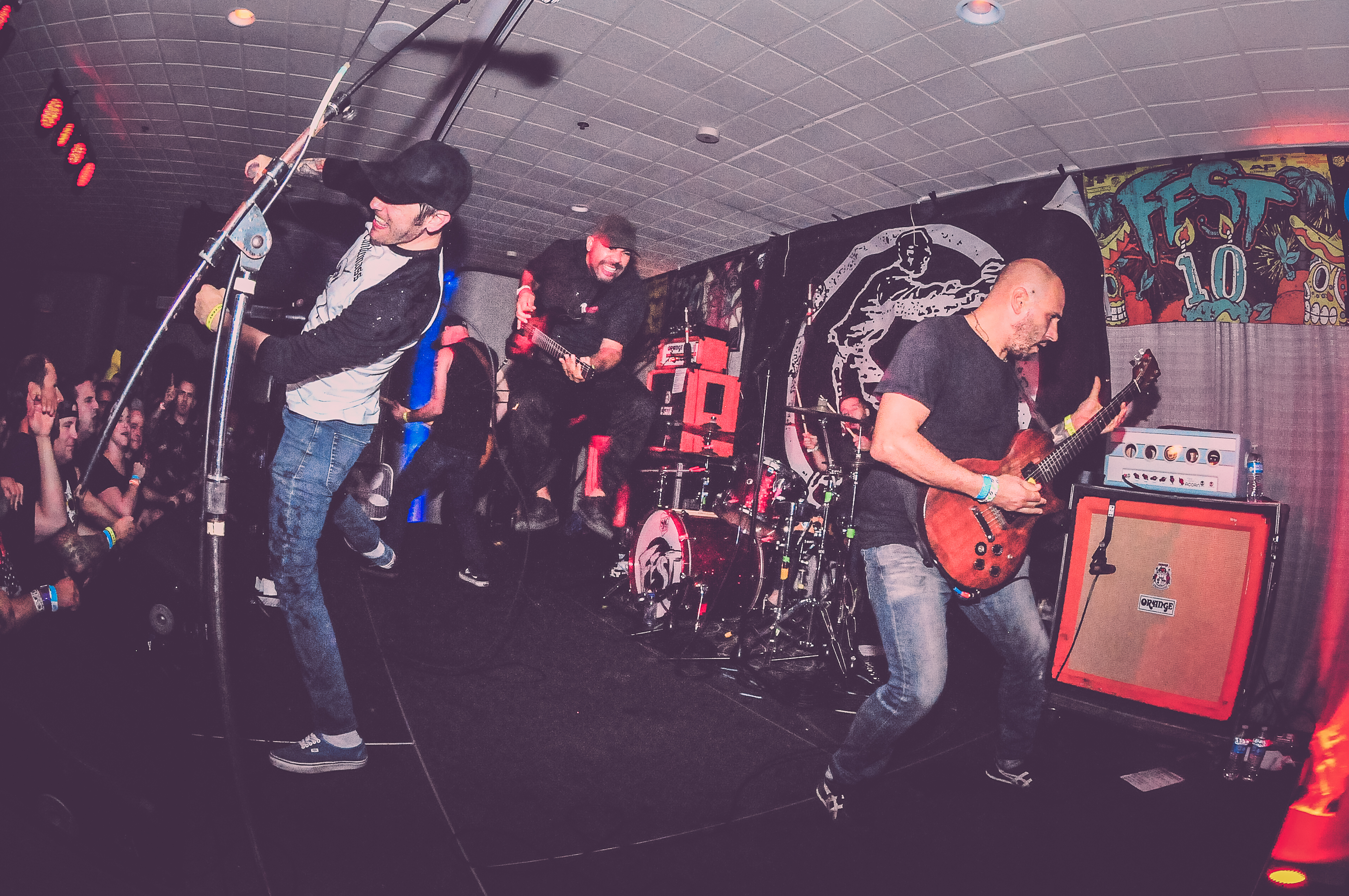
As Friends Rust performing at The Fest 14 in Gainesville, Florida on October 31, 2015, in promotion of Greatest Hits?.

Dutch record label Shield Recordings re-issued the compact disc (housed in a digipak) and issued a 12-inch vinyl edition of Greatest Hits? for the European market on April 29, 2015. The European version omitted three songs, "Fire on 8th and 3rd", "Scapegoat Wets the Whistle" and "Operation", due to vinyl time constraints. The vinyl's first pressing was housed in a gatefold sleeve and came on a choice of solid black, solid yellow or black and yellow swirl colors.

As Friends Rust continued to promote Greatest Hits? with a handful of concerts in 2015, starting with a show at Saint Vitus in Brooklyn, New York on April 30, 2015. The band also performed at the Groezrock festival in Meerhout, Belgium on May 2, 2015, and at The Wooly as part of The Fest 14 in Gainesville, Florida on October 31, 2015.

Shield Recordings repressed the vinyl edition on May 9, 2019; this second pressing was housed in a standard record sleeve and was offered on an orange (announced as red and yellow swirl) color. The repress coincided with new As Friends Rust concerts performed that year, including one at The Kingsland in Brooklyn, New York on April 25, 2019, and two on the same day at Molotow in Hamburg, Germany on June 8, 2019, as part of the Booze Cruise Festival.

== Critical reception ==
Professional ratings
Review scores
Source	Rating
Dying Scene	4/5 stars
Handle Me Down	7/10 stars
Idioteq	Positive
Mass Movement	Positive
Ox-Fanzine	4/5 stars
Punk Rock Theory	8/10 stars
Razorcake	Positive
Skartnak Webzine	4/5 stars
Some Will Never Know	9/10 stars

Greatest Hits? received mostly positive critical reviews upon release. Critics noted that the release was an excellent introduction to As Friends Rust for new listeners, that it offered a good cross-section of the band's works, and that it celebrated the best songs from its past releases. The band was praised for its offering of songs with hit-potential, and showcasing a variety of styles not many other bands can match. The inclusion of "Coffee Black" was praised as an underrated classic. Critics also distinguished a progression in style and production values during the span of the compilation, describing the first few songs as rougher, heavier, and screamier; the middle section as more punk, and melodic; and the last offerings as more rock and pop-oriented.

As Friends Rust's style was described by contemporary critics as melodic hardcore, melodic punk rock, Emotional Hardcore, aggressive hardcore, and post-hardcore. Reviewers compared the band's sound to Avail, Dag Nasty, Samiam, Stretch Arm Strong, Shai Hulud, Small Brown Bike, Grade, and Hot Water Music. As Friends Rust's songs were described as well-written and catchy, aggressive-progressive, sharp and melody-focused, and filled with sing-alongs. Moyal's vocals and lyrics were lauded by critics, declaring him "nothing short of amazing", and "one of the best frontman of the 90s". Others opined that "lyrically, the band completely overshadows the majority of their contemporaries", and " Moyal offers lyrics other hardcore bands can only dream about".

== Track listing ==
Credits are adapted from the compilation's liner notes. All lyrics by Moyal, except "Operation" by Lucky Lehrer and Roger Rogerson.

No.	Title	Music	Original release	Length
1.	"Encante"	Olmino; Gomez; Crum	The Fists of Time	3:52
2.	"When People Resort to Name Calling"	Olmino; Gomez; Crum	The Fists of Time	3:38
3.	"Ruffian"	Olmino; Gomez; Crum	The Fists of Time	3:06
4.	"Home Is Where the Heart Aches"	Kirkpatrick; Simmons; Stewart; Tarpley	The Fists of Time	2:29
5.	"Half Friend Town"	Kirkpatrick; Simmons; Stewart; Glayat	As Friends Rust	2:17
6.	"Like Strings (Spell It with a K)"	Kirkpatrick; Simmons; Stewart; Glayat	As Friends Rust	2:15
7.	"Fire on 8th and 3rd" (not included on European version)	Kirkpatrick; Simmons; Stewart; Glayat	As Friends Rust	0:11
8.	"Coffee Black"	Kirkpatrick; Simmons; Stewart; Glayat	As Friends Rust	3:18
9.	"Scapegoat Wets the Whistle" (not included on European version)	Kirkpatrick; Simmons; Stewart; Glayat	As Friends Rust	3:43
10.	"Operation" (not included on European version)	Lehrer; Rogerson	As Friends Rust	1:40
11.	"The First Song on the Tape You Make Her"	Kirkpatrick; Simmons; Stewart; Bartsocas	As Friends Rust / Discount	2:57
12.	"Perfect Stranglers"	Simmons; Beckham; Swain; Rankine	Won	3:02
13.	"We on Some Next Level Shit"	Simmons; Beckham; Swain; Rankine	Won	3:34
14.	"Laughing Out Loud"	Simmons; Beckham; Swain; Rankine	Won	3:33
15.	"Won't Be the First Time"	Simmons; Beckham; Swain; Rankine	Won	3:01
16.	"Born With a Silver Spoon Up Your Ass"	Simmons; Beckham; Swain; Rankine	A Young Trophy Band in the Parlance of Our Times	3:01
17.	"More Than Just Music, It's a Hairstyle"	Simmons; Beckham; Swain; Rankine	A Young Trophy Band in the Parlance of Our Times	3:11
Total length:				48:52

== Personnel ==
Credits are adapted from the compilation's liner notes.

As Friends Rust

- Damien Moyal – lead vocals (all songs)
- Henry Olmino – guitar (tracks 1–3)
- Gordon Tarpley – guitar and backing vocals (track 4)
- Joseph Simmons – guitar (tracks 4–17) and backing vocals (track 4)
- James Glayat – guitar (tracks 5–11)
- Christopher Beckham – guitar (tracks 12–17) and backing vocals (tracks 12–15)
- Jeronimo Gomez – bass guitar (tracks 1–3)
- Kaleb Stewart – bass guitar and backing vocals (tracks 4–11)
- Thomas Rankine – bass guitar (tracks 12–17)
- Matthew Crum – drums (tracks 1–3)
- Timothy Kirkpatrick – drums (tracks 4–11) and backing vocals (track 4)
- Zachary Swain – drums (tracks 12–17)

Guest musicians

- Chuck Ragan – backing vocals on (track 4)
- George Rebelo – backing vocals on (track 4)
- Chris Wollard – backing vocals on (track 4)
- Rob McGregor – backing vocals (tracks 4, 11)
- Keith Welsh – backing vocals (track 11)
- James Paul Wisner – backing vocals (tracks 12–15)
- Chad Neptune – backing vocals (tracks 12–15)
- Matthew Crum – additional percussion (tracks 12–15)

Production

- James Paul Wisner – recording engineer, mixer and producer at Wisner Productions (tracks 1–3, 12–17)
- Rob McGregor – recording engineer, mixer and producer at Goldentone Studios (tracks 4–11)
- Mark Portnoy – recording engineer at Landmark Productions & Recording Studios (tracks 12–15)
- Dean Dydek – editor at Wisner Productions (tracks 12–15)
- As Friends Rust – co-mixer and co-producer (tracks 5–10, 16–17)
- Damien Moyal – co-producer (tracks 16–17), artwork, design and liner notes
- Nicholas Forneris – photography

== Release history ==
Release formats for Greatest Hits?
Region	Date	Label	Format	Catalog
Japan	June 4, 2014	Cosmic Note	CD	EZCT-52
Indonesia	December 27, 2014	D'Kolektif	Tape	DK007
Netherlands	April 29, 2015	Shield Recordings	CD	SLD 076
Netherlands	April 29, 2015	Shield Recordings	12" Vinyl	SLD 076
Netherlands	April 29, 2015	Shield Recordings	Digital	SLD 076
Netherlands	May 9, 2019	Shield Recordings	12" Vinyl (repress)	SLD 076
