= BCore Disc =

Hardcore record label

BCore Disc is an independent Spanish record label focused on the hardcore punk DIY culture, founded in 1990.

== History ==
BCore Disc began in Barcelona 1990, with the edition of the first record by the Barcelonian band Corn Flakes, called No Problem. It released mostly Spanish hardcore bands in its earliest period, and through the years it has opened its style range to all indie rock tendencies, from the poppier Les Philippes to the post-rock of G.a.s. drummers passing through Tokyo Sex Destruction's garage, Madee's emo, Standstill's vanguardist post-hardcore, The Unfinished Sympathy's melodic rock and Delorean's electronics. The company was also responsible for organizing the annual Hardcore Festival in Sant Feliu de Guíxols.
