= Eleven Songs (album) =

Compilation album by As Friends Rust
- Released: October 5, 1999 (Japan); October 22, 2001 (U.K.)
- Recorded: November 19, 1996 – May 9, 1999
- Studio: Wisner Productions, Davie, Florida; Goldentone Studios, Gainesville, Florida
- Genre: Melodic hardcore; emotional hardcore
- Length: 30:09
- Label: Howling Bull; Golf
- Producer: James Paul Wisner; Rob McGregor; As Friends Rust

As Friends Rust chronology
As Friends Rust (1999)	Eleven Songs (1999)	Morningleaver / This Is Me Hating You (2001)

Eleven Songs is a compilation album by American melodic hardcore band As Friends Rust. It was originally released on compact disc by Japanese record label Howling Bull Entertainment on October 5, 1999. British record label Golf Records reissued the release, also on compact disc, on October 22, 2001. At the time of its original release in 1999, Eleven Songs was considered somewhat of a discography, since it included all but a single song of what As Friends Rust had released; the Circle Jerks cover "Operation" was omitted.

Though the release bears the title Eleven Songs, it was in fact a licensed edition of As Friends Rust's eponymous extended play with six bonus songs. The licensing deals with Howling Bull Entertainment and Golf Records were set up by Doghouse Records, with which As Friends Rust had an exclusive recording contract. The six additional songs were taken from As Friends Rust's previous releases, The Fists of Time and the split with Discount, which Doghouse Records itself would later compile and re-issue in June 2000 under the expanded title The Fists of Time: An Anthology of Short Fiction and Non-Fiction.

As Friends Rust did not tour Japan in promotion of Howling Bull Entertainment's version of Eleven Songs, but did perform five shows in the United Kingdom when Golf Records released its edition in 2001. Accompanied by Virginia hardcore band Strike Anywhere, As Friends Rust played shows in Glasgow, Scotland, Leeds, England, Leicester, England, Southampton, England and London, England, the last of which was filmed and released on VHS and DVD as Camden Underworld, London – 16 November 2001 in December 2002.

== Background and content ==
The material compiled for Eleven Songs was recorded during four different recording sessions, spread out over a period of four years; from 1996 to 1999.

"Encante", "Ruffian", "When People Resort to Name Calling" and "Broken Brain" were recorded from November 19–22, 1996 at Wisner Productions in Davie, Florida with producer James Paul Wisner. The songs featured the band's original line-up: vocalist Damien Moyal, guitarist Henry Olmino, bass guitarist Jeronimo Gomez and drummer Matthew Crum. Some of the songs had appeared on the band's demo tape, circulated to record labels in late 1996, and all four were later used on As Friends Rust's debut extended play The Fists of Time in 1998.

"Home Is Where the Heart Aches" was recorded in late March 1998 at Goldentone Studios in Gainesville, Florida with producer Rob McGregor. The song features the band's reformed line-up with lead vocalist Moyal, guitarists Joseph Simmons and Gordon Tarpley, bass guitarist and backing vocalist Kaleb Stewart, and drummer Timothy Kirkpatrick. Three members of Hot Water Music; Chuck Ragan, George Rebelo and Chris Wollard; as well as McGregor and all members of As Friends Rust, provided backup vocals on the song. "Home Is Where the Heart Aches" first appeared on The Fists of Time in 1998.

"The First Song on the Tape You Make Her" was recorded in October 1998 at Goldentone Studios with producer Rob McGregor. The song features lead vocalist Moyal, guitarists Simmons and James Glayat, bass guitarist and backing vocalist Stewart and drummer Kirkpatrick. McGregor and Keith Welsh provided backup vocals on the song. "The First Song on the Tape You Make Her" first appeared on As Friends Rust's split with Discount in 1998.

"Half Friend Town", "Like Strings (Spell It with a K)", "Fire on 8th and 3rd", "Coffee Black" and "Scapegoat Wets the Whistle" were recorded on May 9, 1999, at Goldentone Studios, co-produced by Rob McGregor and As Friends Rust. The songs feature lead vocalist Moyal, guitarists Simmons and Glayat, bass guitarist and backing vocalist Stewart and drummer Kirkpatrick. All five songs originally appeared on the band's self-titled extended play in 1999.

== Release, packaging and promotion ==
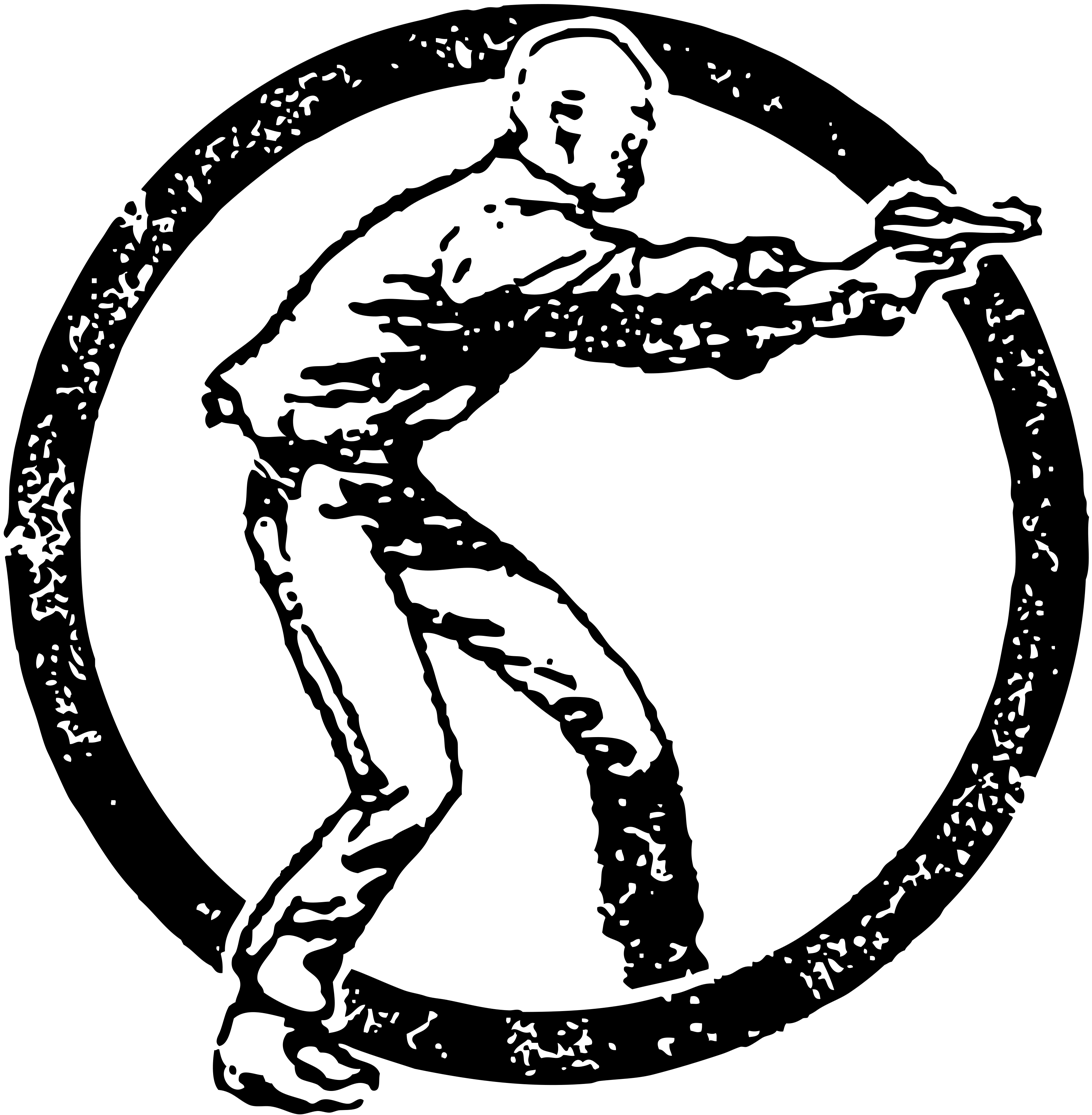
As Friends Rust's "guy with gun" logo, discovered and adapted by Moyal in 1998. The emblem was first used on the As Friends Rust / Discount split and has since appeared on the majority of the band's merchandise, including the cover art of Eleven Songs.

When Doghouse Records signed As Friends Rust to an exclusive recording contract in early 1999, provisions were made to license the band's new and older material to other record labels for foreign markets. The first of these deals was with Japanese record label Howling Bull Entertainment, which licensed the rights to As Friends Rust's new self-titled extended play that Doghouse Records was releasing in September 1999. The Japanese release, officially titled As Friends Rust, but colloquially referred to as Eleven Songs (as written on the cover art), included six bonus songs. Howling Bull Entertainment released Eleven Songs on October 5, 1999.

The cover art and most of the booklet art for Eleven Songs was designed by Moyal. It prominently features As Friends Rust's recognizable "guy with gun" logo; an illustration which Moyal had found on a wall while walking through an alleyway in Chinatown, Boston, Massachusetts in early July 1998, while on tour with Discount.

Eleven Songs was later licensed a second time to British record label Golf Records (a division of Plastic Head Records), and released on October 22, 2001. The release coincided with the release of As Friends Rust's full-length album Won, and the band's five-week European and United Kingdom tour with Virginia hardcore band Strike Anywhere. The tour spanned from October 29 to December 5, 2001, and included five dates in the United Kingdom: Glasgow, Scotland, Leeds, England, Leicester, England, Southampton, England and London, England, the last of which was filmed and released on VHS and DVD as Camden Underworld, London – 16 November 2001 in December 2002.

== Critical reception ==
Professional ratings
Review scores
Source	Rating
Absolute Punk	Mixed
Delusions of Adequacy	Positive
Groove	Negative
Inside Knowledge	Mixed
Organ	Positive
Ox-Fanzine	Positive

Eleven Songs received mixed critical reviews upon release. While most reviewers praised the songwriting and the band, it was often pointed out that this was simply a repackaging of already-available material.

== Track listing ==
Credits are adapted from the compilation's liner notes.

Due to a mastering error on behalf of Doghouse Records, through which the songs "Fire on 8th and 3rd" and "Coffee Black" were incorrectly indexed, the two songs have incorrect lengths on the compact disc. The correct lengths are presented here for accuracy.

No.	Title	Lyrics	Music	Length
1.	"Half Friend Town"	Moyal	Kirkpatrick; Simmons; Stewart; Glayat	2:17
2.	"Like Strings (Spell It with a K)"	Moyal	Kirkpatrick; Simmons; Stewart; Glayat	2:15
3.	"Fire on 8th and 3rd"	Moyal	Kirkpatrick; Simmons; Stewart; Glayat	0:12
4.	"Coffee Black"	Moyal	Kirkpatrick; Simmons; Stewart; Glayat	3:18
5.	"Scapegoat Wets the Whistle"	Moyal	Kirkpatrick; Simmons; Stewart; Glayat	3:43
6.	"The First Song on the Tape You Make Her"	Moyal	Kirkpatrick; Simmons; Stewart; Bartsocas	2:59
7.	"Home Is Where the Heart Aches"	Moyal	Kirkpatrick; Simmons; Stewart; Tarpley	2:31
8.	"Encante"	Moyal	Olmino; Gomez; Crum	3:53
9.	"Ruffian"	Moyal	Olmino; Gomez; Crum	3:06
10.	"When People Resort to Name Calling"	Moyal	Olmino; Gomez; Crum	3:39
11.	"Broken Brain"	Moyal	Olmino; Gomez; Crum	2:20
Total length:				30:09

== Personnel ==
Credits are adapted from the compilation's liner notes.

As Friends Rust

- Damien Moyal – lead vocals (all tracks)
- Henry Olmino – guitar (tracks 8–11)
- Joseph Simmons – guitar (tracks 1–7) and backing vocals (track 7)
- Gordon Tarpley – guitar and backing vocals (track 7)
- James Glayat – guitar (tracks 1–6)
- Jeronimo Gomez – bass guitar (tracks 8–11)
- Kaleb Stewart – bass guitar and backing vocals (tracks 1–7)
- Matthew Crum – drums (tracks 8–11)
- Timothy Kirkpatrick – drums (tracks 1–7) and backing vocals (track 7)

Guest musicians

- Chuck Ragan – backing vocals (track 7)
- George Rebelo – backing vocals (track 7)
- Chris Wollard – backing vocals (track 7)
- Rob McGregor – backing vocals (track 6–7)
- Keith Welsh – backing vocals (track 6)

Production

- James Paul Wisner – recording engineer, mixer and producer at Wisner Productions (tracks 8–11)
- Rob McGregor – recording engineer, mixer and producer at Goldentone Studios (tracks 1–7)
- As Friends Rust – co-mixer and co-producer (tracks 1–5)
- Damien Moyal – artwork and design

== Release history ==
Release formats for Eleven Songs
Region	Date	Label	Format	Catalog
Japan	October 5, 1999	Howling Bull Entertainment	CD	HWCY-24
United Kingdom	October 22, 2001	Golf Records	CD	CDHOLE040
