= Won (As Friends Rust album) =

Studio album by As Friends Rust
- Released: October 23, 2001
- Recorded: July 2001
- Studios: Wisner Productions, Davie, Florida; Landmark Productions & Recording Studios, Fort Lauderdale, Florida
- Genres: Melodic hardcore; emotional hardcore; punk rock
- Length: 31:42
- Label: Doghouse
- Producer: James Paul Wisner

As Friends Rust chronology
| Eleven Songs (1999) | Won (2001) | A Young Trophy Band in the Parlance of Our Times (2002) |

Won is the first full-length album by American melodic hardcore band As Friends Rust. It was released on compact disc, 12-inch vinyl and digitally by American record label Doghouse Records on October 23, 2001. German record label Defiance Records licensed the rights to release the album on compact disc and 12-inch vinyl for the European market, though this edition was released a week earlier than the American one, on October 15, 2001. Japanese record label Howling Bull Entertainment also licensed the rights to release the album for the Asian market; this compact disc edition was released even earlier, on October 5, 2001, and includes two bonus tracks.

In promotion of the release, As Friends Rust toured the United States, Canada, United Kingdom and Europe several times between August 2001 and November 2002, accompanied by such bands as Brand New, Coheed and Cambria, Thursday, Strike Anywhere, Sick of It All, Further Seems Forever, The Movielife, Shai Hulud, Planes Mistaken for Stars, Open Hand, Shelter, Keepsake, Hotwire, Fairweather, The Sainte Catherines, This Day Forward, Bloodlet, The Reunion Show, The Stryder, Liars Academy, Garrison, Vangard, Clark, Running from Dharma, Prevent Falls, The Remedy Session, Durango 95 and The Copperpot Journals. The band also performed at notable festivals like Van's Warped Tour in Los Angeles and San Francisco, California, Furnacefest in Birmingham, Alabama, Gainesvillefest in Gainesville, Florida, Krazy Fest in Louisville, Kentucky, Hell City Tattoo Festival in Columbus, Ohio, Philly Music Festival in Philadelphia, Pennsylvania, Gorefest in Miami, Florida, Orlando Magicfest in Orlando, Florida, Chaos Days Festival in Savannah, Georgia, Ieperfest in Ypres, Belgium, Defiance Festival in Cologne, Germany, Mondsee Open Air Festival in Hohenmölsen, Germany, Nordhausen Festival in Nordhausen, Germany and Sommerspektakel Open Air Festival in Sarstedt, Germany.

Won's writing and recording sessions, and following promotional tours, featured a great deal of member changes for As Friends Rust. Prior to recording the album, the band lost three of its five members, leaving only lead vocalist Damien Moyal and guitarist Joseph Simmons. Guitarist and backing vocalist Christopher "Floyd" Beckham, bass guitarist Guillermo Amador and drummer Alexander Vernon were recruited, and with whom part of the album was written and demoed. Vernon was then replaced by Zachary Swain and Amador by Thomas Rankine; this line-up completed the writing of the album and participated in the recording of Won. Only four months after the album's release, Moyal quit the band. This forced Beckham to step up as lead vocalist, and in turn former member Gordon Tarpley returned as fill-in guitarist for a month's worth of shows, before As Friends Rust had a chance to recruit new lead vocalist Adam D'Zurilla. Four months later, Beckham also departed. After completing a European and British tour as a four-piece, and fulfilling most of its contractual obligations to the many record labels to which the band was signed, the remaining members of As Friends Rust decided to change the band's name to Salem in September 2002; less than a year after the album's release. Salem continued to tour in promotion of the release for two more months before focusing on new material.

== Composition and recording ==
Before beginning work on its first full-length album, As Friends Rust went through major line-up changes in late 2000. The band had previously released three extended plays; The Fists of Time, a split with Discount (both in 1998) and As Friends Rust (in 1999), and had been touring in promotion of that material since June 1998. As Friends Rust had hoped to record a full-length album in late 1999 or early 2000, but was unable to compose enough new material. The band again planned to work on a full-length album in late 2000, having written a handful of songs described as "calmer and more depressing", but this material was eventually abandoned due to line-up changes. Prior to leaving on a European and British tour in September 2000, guitarist James Glayat and drummer Timothy Kirkpatrick announced their desire to leave the band upon returning home. However, tensions during the tour ultimately caused a much bigger change in membership, so much so that the future of As Friends Rust was questioned.

Ex-As Friends Rust guitarist Peter Bartsocas was visiting Europe at the same time and decided to travel with the band. When Glayat injured his leg during the first week of the tour and flew home early, Bartsocas filled the vacant guitarist position. Several shows later, lead vocalist Damien Moyal lost his voice, leading bass guitarist and backing vocalist Kaleb Stewart to take up lead vocals, and in turn Bartsocas temporarily filled in as bass guitarist. Moyal and guitarist Joseph Simmons called Christopher "Floyd" Beckham (Glayat's at-the-time roommate, and an ex-member of Morning Again, Culture and Crucible) from Europe, asking him to join As Friends Rust as its new guitarist upon returning home, much to Stewart's dismay, leading the latter to quit the band. Moyal and Stewart were initially to stay over in Europe following As Friends Rust's tour, for a second tour with their other band Bridgeburne R, but Moyal was forced to find a new bass guitarist for both bands, as well as a new drummer for As Friends Rust. Due to its membership changes, As Friends Rust had to pull out of playing Gainesvillefest in December 2000.

The band briefly considered becoming a four-piece, with Simmons as sole guitarist and Beckham as bass guitarist (finding it easier to fill a single missing member on drums), and shortening the band's name to The Rust. By early 2001, the band was actively writing material for its planned first full-length album, as part of its existing three-release recording contract with Doghouse Records. The Doghouse Records contract called for one extended play (used up with As Friends Rust) and two full-length albums; The Fists of Time: An Anthology of Short Fiction and Non-Fiction was a reissue of previously recorded material and did not count towards the contract.

The title of the planned album, Won, was chosen early on, as a motivator to persevere and overcome the difficulties that the band was facing. As Friends Rust was often told by its peers that it would never make it to having a full-length album; the band was therefore motivated to win that challenge. During the making of the album, the band faced further delays, leading affiliates to doubt that it would ever come to completion. The title was also a pun on the homophonous word one, since the release symbolized the band's first full-length album.

The limited edition fan series single Morningleaver / This Is Me Hating You, released by Doghouse Records in late March 2001, features demo recordings of two songs from Won.

Moyal, Simmons and Beckham then recruited bass guitarist Guillermo Amador (who was also playing in Army of Ponch and would later play in Rehasher) in January 2001, and drummer Alexander Vernon (formerly of Twelve Tribes and who would later play in Mouth of the Architect) in February 2001, allowing Beckham to resume his position as guitarist. On February 27 and 28, 2001, As Friends Rust recorded demos of two new songs, "Morningleaver" and "This Is Me Hating You", with producer Rob McGregor at Goldentone Studios. The band had previously recorded at Goldentone Studios three times, for songs released on The Fists of Time, the split with Discount and As Friends Rust. The demo recordings of the two new songs were used on Doghouse Records' limited edition 7" vinyl Fan Series, released in late March 2001. As Friends Rust was one of only five bands selected by Doghouse Records for the Fan Series, the others being Chamberlain, River City High, Favez and Moods for Moderns. As Friends Rust's Fan Series 7" vinyl was available on marbled blue or black colors and was limited to 1500 copies.

Further line-up changes resulted with Zachary Swain (formerly of Rosalind, Adversary and Carlisle) replacing Vernon on drums in March 2001, and Thomas Rankine (formerly of Crestfallen, Bird of Ill Omen, Dead Men's Theory, Anchorman and Crucible) replacing Amador on bass in April 2001. Within four months, the band had written enough new songs for a full-length album.

Although As Friends Rust had been recording with producer Rob McGregor at Goldentone Studios in Gainesville, Florida for the previous three years, the band opted to record its debut album with producer James Paul Wisner at Wisner Productions in Davie, Florida; Wisner had recorded As Friends Rust's very first recording session in November 1996. By recording at Wisner Productions, the band was able to obtain a fuller and more polished sound. The band also benefited from an increased recording budget, courtesy of Doghouse Records.

Moyal, Simmons, Beckham, Swain and Rankine spent sixteen days in early July 2001 tracking ten songs for Won. The drum tracks were recorded by Mark Portnoy at Landmark Productions & Recording Studios in Fort Lauderdale, Florida, while the rest of the instruments and the vocals were recorded, mixed and produced by Wisner at Wisner Productions. The recorded material included new versions of "Morningleaver" and "This Is Me Hating You", newly-written songs "We on Some Next Level Shit", "Fourteen or So", "Austin, We Have a Problem", "Won't Be the First Time", "Perfect Stranglers", "Laughing Out Loud" and "Last Call", as well as "Ten" and an unlisted hidden track, both of which Moyal improvised lyrics to in the studio. Former As Friends Rust drummer Matthew Crum contributed additional percussion to the session, while backing vocals were provided by Beckham, Wisner and Further Seems Forever bass guitarist Chad Neptune.

== Release and packaging ==
Won was originally scheduled for release in the early summer of 2001, but it was first pushed back to give the band more time to polish the songs and to book a two-week recording session at Wisner Productions. Doghouse Records then planned to release the album in August 2001, but it was again pushed back, this time due to complications with the layout and packaging. The delays also caused a missed September 2001 release, but Won finally hit the stores around the globe in October 2001. By that time, As Friends Rust had been out on tour promoting the release for two-and-a-half months.

The artwork and layout for Won had already been designed by Moyal and Jason Page, with photographs by Nicholas Forneris, in June 2001, prior to the recording session. The packaging for the 12" vinyl edition was a straight-forward cardboard sleeve with a twelve-page booklet, but the packaging for the compact disc edition was upgraded to a six-panel digipak (with a matching twelve-page booklet), so the layout had to be slightly revised. The yellow-background drawings included on the inside portion of the digipak were illustrated by Moyal. Unlike As Friends Rust's other releases, Won deliberately did not include Moyal's lyrics in the liner notes. Instead, the band posted the lyrics to the songs on its official website.

Doghouse Records arranged for the licensing of Won to other markets where the band would be touring, namely Europe and Japan. Japanese record label Howling Bull Entertainment, which had previously released As Friends Rusts' Eleven Songs on compact disc in October 1999, licensed the rights to release Won on compact disc for the Asian market. The Japanese edition was first planned for a September 5, 2001 release, then pushed back to a September 18, 2001 release, but finally came out on October 5, 2001. The OBI strip erroneously gives the September 18, 2001 date. It included two bonus tracks: the demo versions of "Morningleaver" and "This Is Me Hating You" recorded in February 2001 at Goldentone Studios. The album was distributed in Japan by Pryaid Records.

For the European market, Doghouse Records licensed Won to German record label Defiance Records. Defiance Records obtained the rights to put out the album on compact disc and 12" vinyl, releasing its editions on October 15, 2001. The German 12" vinyl edition was available on light blue or black colors. The album was distributed in Europe by Zomba Distribution. Doghouse Records also licensed Eleven Songs to British record label Golf Records, which released a compact disc version of the compilation on October 22, 2001. Doghouse Records' own edition of Won was released on compact disc and black 12" vinyl in the United States on October 23, 2001. The album was distributed in the United States by Lumberjack Distribution.

== Promotion ==
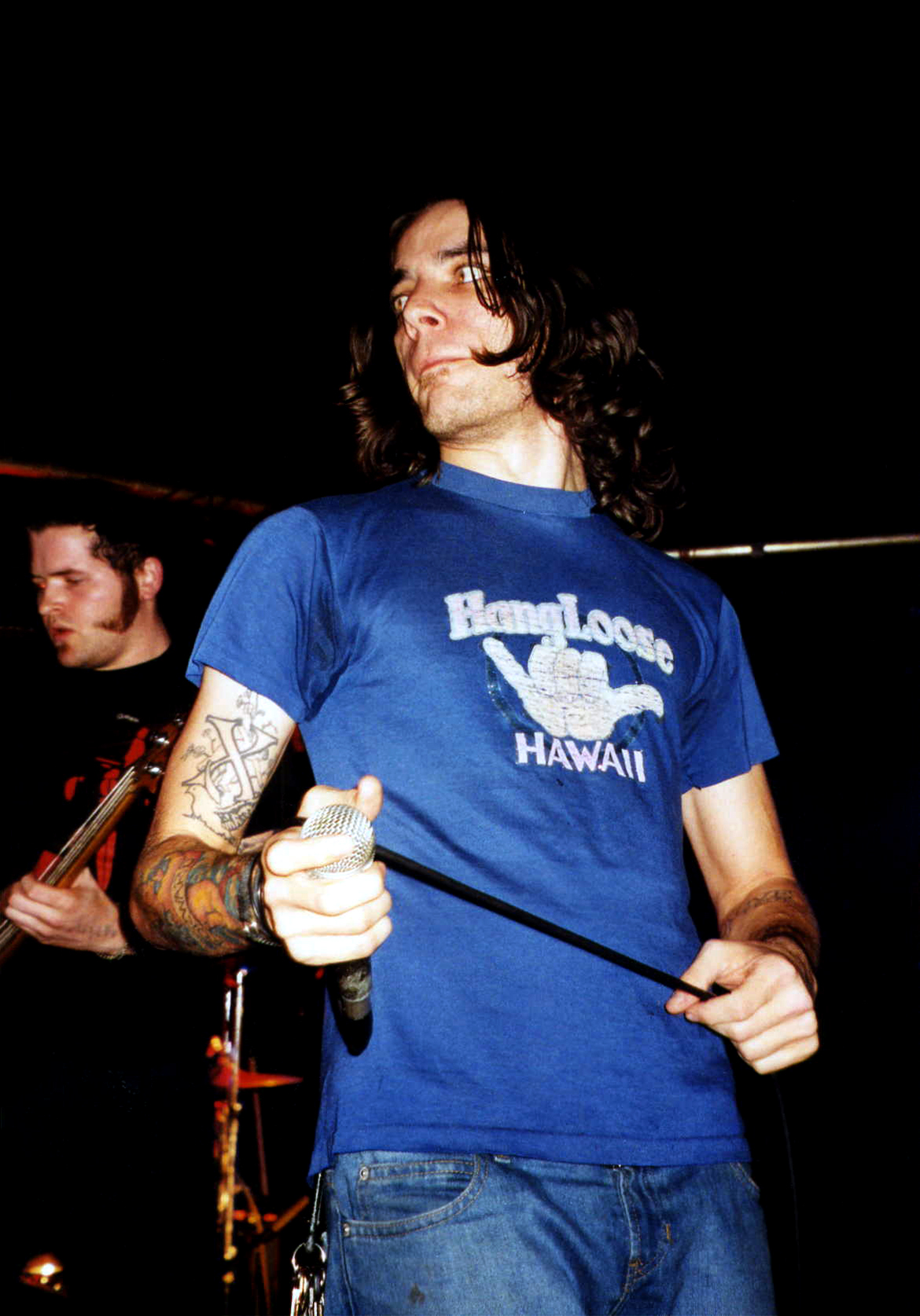
As Friends Rust performing at Underground in Cologne, Germany in promotion of Won on November 4, 2001. From left to right: Thomas Rankine and Damien Moyal.

Following the band's membership changes in September 2000, As Friends Rust did not perform live again for eight months, until late May 2001. While writing, recording and planning the release of Won, As Friends Rust booked shows to hit the road full-time. The band planned to tour the United States and Canada, Europe and the United Kingdom and Japan throughout 2001 and 2002. The band mostly played shows in Gainesville, Florida while preparing the release, with the exception of the Orlando Magic Fest in Orlando, Florida on June 15, 2001.

Since Won was initially scheduled for release in August 2001, As Friends Rust began touring full-time in support of the release early that month. The band first hit the road with a ten-day East Coast United States tour, spanning from August 4–12, 2001, accompanied by Gainesville, Florida-based punk rockers Vangard. The first show of the tour was a stop to play Furnacefest in Birmingham, Alabama. The two bands next played up the east coast until they reached Philadelphia, Pennsylvania for the Philly Music Festival.

Later in August 2001, As Friends Rust embarked on a three-week tour of the United States' East Coast and Midwest, spanning from August 23 to September 15, 2001. The tour was initially scheduled to be shared with Miami, Florida-based hardcore band Where Fear and Weapons Meet, however, that band announced its breakup shortly after the booking in April 2001, citing the loss of its second vocalist Joe Caro (though it would eventually reform with a different line-up). Instead, the first half of the tour was shared with Coral Springs, Florida-based emo band Keepsake, while the second half of the tour was shared with Pompano Beach, Florida-based emo band Further Seems Forever (with which As Friends Rust had originally planned to tour from September 15–30, 2001). The tour was cut short, however, following the September 11, 2001 attacks in New York City. As Friends Rust and Further Seems Forever cancelled the last five dates of the tour as a result, since they were playing in the vicinity of New York, culminating in New York City itself on September 14, 2001.

After a month-and-a-half off, As Friends Rust travelled over the Atlantic Ocean for a five-week tour of Europe and the United Kingdom. The entire tour, which spanned from October 29 to December 5, 2001, was shared with Richmond, Virginia-based punk rock band Strike Anywhere (which had previously toured the United States with As Friends Rust during the summer of 2000). Peoria, Illinois-based post-hardcore band Planes Mistaken for Stars joined the two bands for the first leg of the tour, while German hardcore band Durango 95 supported the last leg of shows in Europe. A highlight performance at London, England's Camden Underworld from midway through the tour, on November 16, 2001, was filmed and later released on video and DVD by British home video company Punkervision in December 2002. The chemistry shared between As Friends Rust and Strike Anywhere on tour also gave talk to releasing a split single by the two bands, but it never materialized. A month into the tour, Moyal suffered a back injury while setting up for a show at the Wild at Heart in Berlin, Germany, leaving him with limited mobility for the last week of European concerts. As Friends Rust played its last show of the year on December 15, 2001 at Gainesvillefest in Gainesville, Florida.

As Friends Rust took two months off touring from mid-December 2001 to late-February 2002. During this time, the band recorded another extended play, A Young Trophy Band in the Parlance of Our Times, which was later released in May 2002 through Equal Vision Records and Defiance Records. Tension within the band resulted with Moyal recording his vocals separately and co-producing the material without the other four members' presence. Less than two weeks after the recording session, Moyal quit As Friends Rust, citing dissatisfaction with touring and wanting to focus on school and his then-girlfriend. In retrospective interviews, Moyal reflected that the new members, Beckham, Swain and Rankine, were taking As Friends Rust in a more mainstream and polished, radio-friendly, direction, which in turn led to his loss of interest. In an interview conducted shortly after Moyal's departure, Rankine revealed that frictions with the lead vocalist had become increasingly problematic, especially since the band's recent European and British tour from October–December 2001. Rankine further stated that Moyal's attitude had been negative and holding back the band from progressing in a natural direction, and that by leaving suddenly, he had left the band in a difficult situation with record label and touring obligations to fulfill. Moyal, nevertheless, encouraged the band to find a new lead vocalist and continue under the established name. Moyal went on to form Damien Done, a solo project which eventually expanded into a full band, and would later reform As Friends Rust in 2008 with members from the 1998–2000 period.

At the time of Moyal's departure, As Friends Rust already had several upcoming shows scheduled and was in the midst of booking an entire year's worth of tours to fulfill its touring obligations to Doghouse Records, Defiance Records, Howling Bull Entertainment and Equal Vision Records in promotion of both Won and the forthcoming A Young Trophy Band in the Parlance of Our Times. The band was also talking about writing a second full-length album and was being courted by larger record labels. Beckham initially stepped up as temporary lead vocalist, and former As Friends Rust guitarist Gordon Tarpley returned to fill the vacant guitarist position, as the band embarked on a short American Midwest tour supporting Sick of It All, Shai Hulud and Thursday during the first week of March 2002. This was immediately followed by a week-long American East Coast tour with Coheed and Cambria, This Day Forward, The Stryder, Fairweather, Liars Academy and Prevent Falls, which spanned from March 4–12, 2002, as part of the Equal Vision Records Presents: Spring Showcase 2002 Tour, and a one-off date opening for Agnostic Front on Long Island, New York. On the way back to Florida, the band stopped to perform at the Chaos Days Festival in Savannah, Georgia on March 15, 2002.

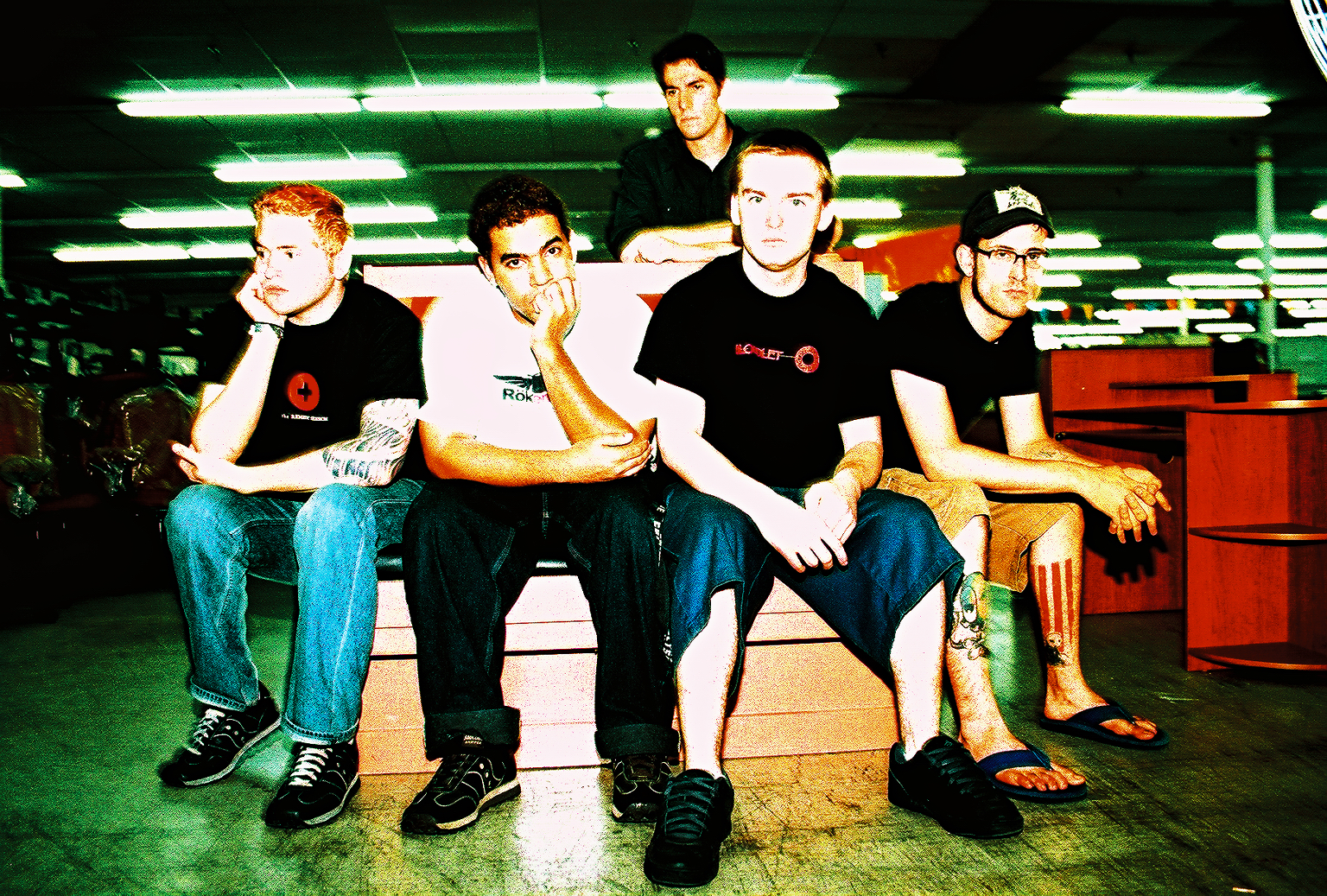
Promotional picture of As Friends Rust circa May 2002. From left to right: Thomas Rankine, Joseph Simmons, Adam D'Zurilla, Zachary Swain and Christopher Beckham.

Adam D'Zurilla (formerly of Short Order, Esteem, Die Tomorrow and Kumité) was finally welcomed as Moyal's replacement in late March 2002, allowing Beckham to return to playing guitar. D'Zurilla's first show was at the Hell City Tattoo Festival in Columbus, Ohio on April 5, 2002. As Friends Rust next embarked on a week-long American East Coast tour with Orlando, Florida-based metalcore band Bloodlet and California-based alternative metal band Hotwire, spanning from April 11–19, 2002, and on its way back stopped to play Gorefest in Miami, Florida. A couple weeks' worth of shows were planned for mid-May 2002 with Gainesville punk rock band House on Fire and Texas emo band Pop Unknown, but most of the dates fell through and As Friends Rust ended up playing a series of one-off shows across the Southern United States. In the last week of May 2002, As Friends Rust played a week's worth of Florida shows with New Jersey post-hardcore band Prevent Falls and Georgia melodic punk rock band Whippersnapper.

As Friends Rust played in Canada for the first time during a two-week tour that spanned from May 28 to June 9, 2002. The entire tour was originally to be shared with Montreal, Quebec-based punk rock band The Sainte Catherines, and covered nearly all of the country, but due to last minute changes, As Friends Rust ended up playing mostly newly booked shows in Quebec and Ontario. The Canadian tour was immediately followed by a full-scale, month-and-a-half-long American tour, accompanied once again by Prevent Falls. Boston, Massachusetts-based post-hardcore band Garrison and South Bend, Indiana-based hardcore band Clark joined select legs of the tour. The tour had a show in nearly every state, spanning from June 12 to July 28, 2002, during which time As Friends Rust had the opportunity to play Krazy Fest 5 in Louisville, Kentucky, and three Van's Warped Tour dates in Los Angeles and San Francisco, California. Upon returning home in late July 2002, Beckham quit the band.

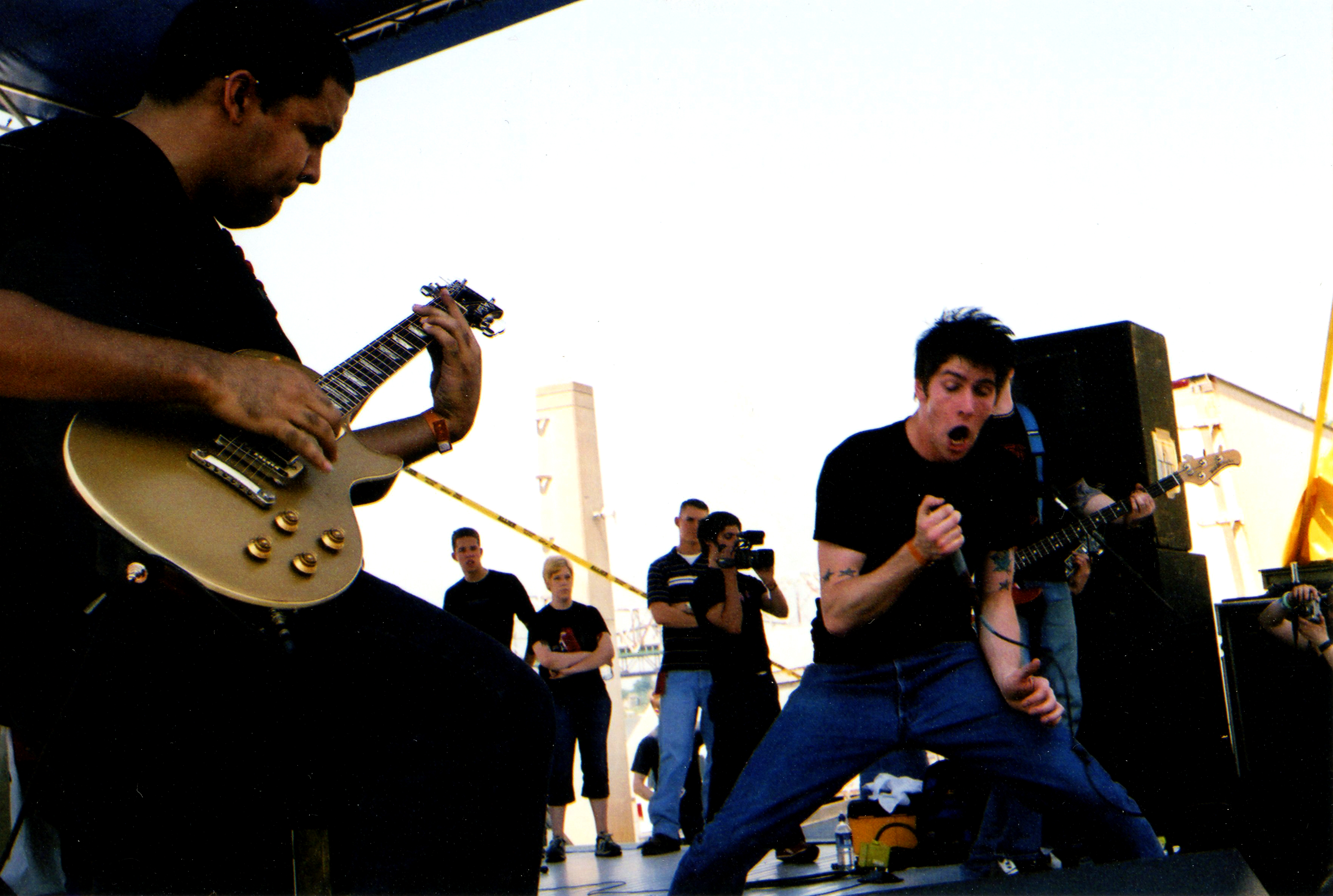
As Friends Rust performing at Krazy Fest 5 in Louisville, Kentucky on June 22, 2002. From left to right: Joseph Simmons, Adam D'Zurilla and Thomas Rankine.

As Friends Rust travelled as a four-piece, with Simmons as sole guitarist, for its month-long tour of Europe and the United Kingdom, which spanned from August 8 to September 11, 2002. The tour included dates to play the Defiance Records Festival in Cologne, Germany, the Sommerspektakel Open Air Festival in Sarstedt, Germany and the Ieperfest in Ypres, Belgium. As Friends Rust was supported by British pop punk band The Copperpot Journals on the ten-date United Kingdom leg.

Prior to leaving for Europe, the band had already discussed abandoning the name As Friends Rust in favor of one that better reflected its new musical direction. It was while on this European and British tour that announcements were made to fans that this would be As Friends Rust's final tour, and that the band would be officially changing its name to Salem upon returning home. Although As Friends Rust officially played its last show on September 11, 2002 in Amsterdam, Netherlands, the band would continue to be billed under its old name as additional tours had been booked well-in-advance for the remainder of 2002. As such, Salem continued to play As Friends Rust songs and tour in promotion of Won and A Young Trophy Band in the Parlance of Our Times for several more months.

Back in the United States, Salem was supposed to go on tour with Florida emo band The Remedy Session, from mid-September to early October 2002, but the tour was cancelled. Salem officially played its first show on September 28, 2002 at The Factory in Fort Lauderdale, Florida, opening for Further Seems Forever, though the band was billed as As Friends Rust. Salem was again billed as As Friends Rust during a tour with Fairweather, Liars Academy, Open Hand and Codeseven, and another with Shelter, Keepsake and Running from Dharma, which both covered the South Eastern United States and together spanned from October 7–21, 2002. It was only once touring began with The Movielife, Brand New and The Reunion Show, which spanned from October 28 to November 16, 2002 across the United States, that the previously booked billing was corrected to feature the band's new name. Upon returning home from this tour, Swain quit the band and Salem properly began moving onto new things away from As Friends Rust.

== Critical reception and recognition ==
Professional ratings
Review scores
| Source | Rating |
|---|---|
| AllMusic | 3/5 stars |
| Allschools Network | 9/10 stars |
| AntiMusic | 4.5/5 |
| Indulged | 5/5 |
| Rock Hard | 8.5/10 |
| Still Holding On! | 5/5 |
| Waste of Mind | 90% |

Won and As Friends Rust received a great deal of positive critical acclaim upon the album's release. Shortly before to the album's release, The Independent Florida Alligator highlighted As Friends Rust in their August 2001 list Gainesville's Best Bands - The Hot 21. In December 2001, As Friends Rust was named "Band of the Month" by East Coast Romper, Indulged, and antiMUSIC magazines. Won was As Friends Rust's first release to enter CMJ New Music Report's charts, reaching #16 on the Radio 200 Adds Chart on December 4, 2001. The album was also listed in the Best Albums of the Month for December 2001 by IMPACT Press.

As with its past releases, As Friends Rust's genre was quickly categorized as melodic hardcore, and emotional hardcore. Though critics of its earlier releases infrequently categorized them as punk rock, the term was commonly used when writing about Won. Other critics opined that the band included elements of indie rock, pop punk, powerpop, post-hardcore, and progressive hardcore.

The band was often categorized as having Washington, D.C. hardcore influences and the Gainesville sound, but was praised for having its own original sound, and for moving away from the local Florida hardcore scene and into a more mainstream and national punk rock scene. Like in reviews of The Fists of Time and As Friends Rust, the band was quickly compared to fellow Gainesville melodic hardcore band Hot Water Music. Other comparisons were drawn to Samiam, Dag Nasty, Avail, Good Riddance, Gorilla Biscuits, Waterdown, Stretch Arm Strong, and Turning Point. Some reviewers found that As Friends Rust's new sound came close to Shades Apart, AFI, H2O, Radon, Spoke, Snapcase, Armchair Martian, Green Day, The Jam, The Clash, and had elements of Depeche Mode.

As Friends Rust's style on Won was described by critics as matured, and a big step forward from its earlier releases, both in songwriting, sound and production. Many noted that As Friends Rust was heading into a mainstream direction. The Palm Beach Post wrote that Won was "hard rock that's dark and intense, a genre-bending release.", while the Palladium-Item noted "As Friends Rust has been compared to Dag Nasty, Avail and Gorilla Biscuits. The Florida group blends punk/hardcore angst with indie-pop hooks and leads and its rock 'n' roll backbone." Most reviewers noted and praised Wisner's production.

The songs on Won were principally described as melodic, catchy, energetic and aggressive. Others noted powerful, driving, and catchy hooks, less hardcore than past releases, and more geared towards melodic rock. The album's softer and more ballad-type songs were singled out. Like on the band's past releases, critics again praised and singled out Moyal's lyrics, describing them as critical and ironic, intelligent, honest, innovative, insightful, raw, and passionate. His vocal delivery was documented as catchy, assertive, aggressive, and with lots of heart and sincerity.

== Track listing ==
All lyrics written by Moyal.

Won track listing
| No. | Title | Music | Length |
|---|---|---|---|
| 1. | "We on Some Next Level Shit" | Simmons; Beckham; Swain; Rankine | 3:34 |
| 2. | "Fourteen or So" | Simmons; Beckham; Swain; Rankine | 1:07 |
| 3. | "Austin, We Have a Problem" | Simmons; Beckham; Swain; Rankine | 3:06 |
| 4. | "Won't Be the First Time" | Simmons; Beckham; Swain; Rankine | 3:01 |
| 5. | "Perfect Stranglers" | Simmons; Beckham; Swain; Rankine | 3:02 |
| 6. | "Morningleaver" | Simmons; Beckham; Amador; Vernon | 2:50 |
| 7. | "Laughing Out Loud" | Simmons; Beckham; Swain; Rankine | 3:33 |
| 8. | "This Is Me Hating You" | Simmons; Beckham; Amador; Vernon | 3:05 |
| 9. | "Last Call" | Simmons; Beckham; Swain; Rankine | 4:20 |
| 10. | "Ten" | Simmons; Beckham; Swain; Rankine | 4:04 |
| Total length: | | | 31:42 |

Won – Japanese bonus tracks
| No. | Title | Music | Length |
|---|---|---|---|
| 11. | "This Is Me Hating You" (demo version) | Simmons; Beckham; Amador; Vernon | 3:07 |
| 12. | "Morningleaver" (demo version) | Simmons; Beckham; Amador; Vernon | 2:51 |
| Total length: | | | 37:40 |

== Personnel ==
As Friends Rust

- Damien Moyal – lead vocals
- Joseph Simmons – guitar
- Christopher Beckham – guitar and backing vocals
- Thomas Rankine – bass guitar
- Zachary Swain – drums
- Guillermo Amador – bass guitar (Japanese bonus tracks only)
- Alexander Vernon – drums (Japanese bonus tracks only)

Guest musicians

- James Paul Wisner – backing vocals and additional guitar
- Chad Neptune – backing vocals
- Matthew Crum – additional percussion

Production

- James Paul Wisner – recording engineer, editor, mixer and producer at Wisner Productions
- Mark Portnoy – recording engineer at Landmark Productions & Recording Studios
- Dean Dydek – editor at Wisner Productions
- Rob McGregor – recording engineer, mixer and producer at Goldentone Studios (Japanese bonus tracks only)
- Damien Moyal – artwork and design
- Nicholas Forneris – photography
- Jason Page – photography, design and layout
- Kobi Finley – liner notes

== Release history ==
Release formats for Won
| Region | Date | Label | Format | Catalog |
|---|---|---|---|---|
| Japan | October 5, 2001 | Howling Bull Entertainment | CD | HWCY-1078 |
| Germany | October 15, 2001 | Defiance | CD | XX |
| Germany | October 15, 2001 | Defiance | LP | XX |
| United States | October 23, 2001 | Doghouse | CD | DOG084 |
| United States | October 23, 2001 | Doghouse | LP | DOG084 |
