= As Friends Rust (EP) =

- As Friends Rust American cover art.

EP by As Friends Rust
- Released: July 1999 (Europe); September 17, 1999 (U.S)
- Recorded: May 9, 1999
- Studios: Goldentone Studios, Gainesville, Florida
- Genres: Melodic hardcore; emotional hardcore
- Length: 11:50 (U.S.); 14:26 (Europe)
- Labels: Doghouse; Good Life
- Producers: Rob McGregor; As Friends Rust

As Friends Rust chronology
As Friends Rust / Discount (1998)	As Friends Rust (1999)	Eleven Songs (1999)

European cover
- As Friends Rust European cover art.

As Friends Rust is the third release by American melodic hardcore band As Friends Rust. It was released on compact disc, 8-inch vinyl and digitally in the United States on September 17, 1999. The eponymous extended play was the band's first output as part of an exclusive three-record contract with Toledo, Ohio-based record company Doghouse Records. As Friends Rust was licensed by Doghouse Records to various foreign markets, beginning with Belgian record label Good Life Recordings, which released the extended play on compact disc and double 7-inch vinyl several months earlier in July 1999. The European edition features a bonus song and a different artwork, but was erroneously promoted by Good Life Recordings as God Hour, though that title never appeared on the actual release. Doghouse Records also licensed As Friends Rust to Japanese record label Howling Bull Entertainment, which released a compact disc edition on October 5, 1999, and British record label Golf Records, which released a compact disc edition on October 22, 2001; these versions included six additional songs, a different artwork, and were promoted under the title Eleven Songs.

In promotion of As Friends Rust, the band toured the United States, United Kingdom and Europe several times between June 1999 and September 2000, accompanied by such musical groups as Strike Anywhere, Grade, Ensign, Ignite, Good Clean Fun, Garrison, Glasseater, Mid Carson July, The Agency, Fast Times and Keith Welsh. While promoting the release, As Friends Rust also performed at notable festivals like Hellfest in Syracuse, New York (two years in a row), Ieper Hardcore Festival in Ypres, Belgium (two years in a row), Dour Festival in Dour, Belgium, Gainesvillefest in Gainesville, Florida, Wilkes-Barre Festival in Wilkes-Barre, Pennsylvania, The Copper Sun Indie Records Winter Festival in Wilkes-Barre, Pennsylvania, Detroit Fest in Eastpointe, Michigan, Krazy Fest in Louisville, Kentucky, Mixed Messages in Minneapolis, Minnesota, Pheer Festival in College Park, Maryland, Festival Hardcore in Sant Feliu de Guíxols, Spain, Metropolis Festival in Rotterdam, Netherlands, TurboPunk Festival in Poznań, Poland, Transmitter Festival in Hohenems, Austria, Complete MADness Festival in Potsdam, Germany and Good Life Midsummer Hardcore Festival in Kuurne, Belgium.

The extended play was recorded with lead vocalist Damien Moyal, guitarists Joseph Simmons and James Glayat, bass guitarist and backing vocalist Kaleb Stewart and drummer Timothy Kirkpatrick. Though most of the touring in promotion of As Friends Rust featured the same core members, the line-up changed almost completely during its final European tour in September 2000, leading to uncertainty about the band's future. Glayat and Kirkpatrick announced that they would quit the band upon their return from the European tour, though Glayat injured his leg during the first week of the tour and was replaced by former As Friends Rust guitarist Peter Bartsocas. Moyal then suffered voice problems during the same European tour, leading Stewart to sing lead vocals at a handful of shows (with Bartsocas switching to bass). Looking to replace Glayat, Moyal and Simmons recruited guitarist Christopher "Floyd" Beckham, which in turn lead to Stewart's unexpected departure. After a short hiatus and further line-up changes, As Friends Rust's new line-up recorded its follow-up album Won in 2001.

== Composition and recording ==
After several months of touring in promotion of the band's debut extended play, The Fists of Time, As Friends Rust was signed to a three-record deal in late 1998, by American record label Doghouse Records. In early April 1999, Doghouse Records announced that the band would be recording a four-song extended play, scheduled for release on June 15, 1999. By May 1999, however, the release date had been moved forward to July 15, 1999, then to August 19, 1999 (it would ultimately be delayed by another month, with its actual release date on September 17, 1999).

On May 9, 1999, As Friends Rust returned to Goldentone Studios, where it had previously recorded two songs in March and October 1998, to record six new songs with producer Rob McGregor. The band was then made up of lead vocalist Damien Moyal, guitarists Joseph Simmons and James Glayat, bass guitarist and backing vocalist Kaleb Stewart and drummer Timothy Kirkpatrick. The new material recorded included "Half Friend Town", "Like Strings (Spell It With a K)", "Fire on 8th and 3rd", "Coffee Black", "Scapegoat Wets the Whistle", was well as a cover of Circle Jerks' "Operation", planned for a split 7-inch vinyl with Hot Water Music. The session was co-produced by As Friends Rust.

When describing the difference between the lyrical content from The Fists of Time, Moyal noted that the band's debut extended play dealt with more personal incidents, whereas As Friends Rust documented events that the entire band lived through between November 1998 and April 1999. This included betrayal by friends, ex-girlfriends and even other bands. The song "Half Friend Town" was written about Gainesville, Florida's divided hardcore community; notably bands signed to No Idea Records versus the rest of local bands, and As Friends Rust's difficulty finding other bands willing to play shows with them. This division was noted in the releases' liner notes as well. Another new song, "Coffee Black", dealt with consumerism, while "Fire on 8th and 3rd" was written about a house fire that broke out across the street from where most of the band members lived. The song "Scapegoat Wets the Whistle" was written about Moyal giving up the straight-edge lifestyle and the attitude taken by his former fans once they heard the news.

== Release and packaging ==
=== Good Life Recordings version ===
All six songs, "Half Friend Town", "Like Strings (Spell It with a K)", "Fire on 8th and 3rd", "Coffee Black", "Scapegoat Wets the Whistle" and "Operation", were packaged by Belgian record label Good Life Recordings on a compact disc and double 7-inch vinyl, released in July 1999. Good Life Recordings had previously released As Friends Rusts' The Fists of Time on compact disc and 10-inch vinyl, and the split with Discount on compact disc and 7-inch vinyl. The As Friends Rust double 7-inch vinyl was available on a choice of clear blue and mint green (one each), limited to 500 copies, or double black, limited to 1500 copies.

Good Life Recordings had originally planned the release as a single 7-inch vinyl, which only included four songs, planning to include "Scapegoat Wets the Whistle" as a compact disc-exclusive (similar to what the label had done with Culture's extended play Heteronome in 1997). The Circle Jerks cover, "Operation", was also originally reserved for a split 7-inch vinyl with Hot Water Music, with which As Friends Rust was scheduled to tour Europe in promotion of the new release. Once the co-headlining tour fell through, Good Life Recordings cancelled the split and instead included "Operation" directly on As Friends Rust. A second 7-inch was added to the vinyl edition, which included "Scapegoat Wets the Whistle" (in place of where Hot Water Music's cover of Circle Jerks' "Wild in the Streets" was to be), and "Operation" on the reverse. The compact disc edition also included a one-minute silent track prior to "Operation", presenting it as a bonus track.

The artwork for the Good Life Recordings version of As Friends Rust was designed by Moyal, with band photographs taken by Nicholas Forneris and Vincent Kempeneers. Although the 7-inch vinyl cover only bears the band name, and the compact disc jewel case spine bears the words 6-Song CD, Good Life Recordings owner Edward Verhaeghe, through a language barrier, misunderstood the releases' title to be God Hour and included the title in the press release and promotional poster.

=== Doghouse Records version ===
All five original As Friends Rust songs, "Half Friend Town", "Like Strings (Spell It with a K)", "Fire on 8th and 3rd", "Coffee Black", "Scapegoat Wets the Whistle", were packaged by Doghouse Records on a compact disc and 8-inch vinyl. The cover song, "Operation", was not released to the American market until a year later when Doghouse Records included it on a re-issue of The Fists of Time: An Anthology of Short Fiction and Non-Fiction. Originally scheduled for release on August 19, 1999, Doghouse Records delayed the release of As Friends Rust to brick and mortar stores to September 17, 1999; but it was available a week earlier through the record label's website and through its distributor, Lumberjack Distribution. The 8-inch vinyl was available on a choice of blue, clear or black colors. The artwork for the Doghouse Records version of As Friends Rust, which included pictures of the house most members lived in, was designed by Moyal, Stewart and Jason Page.

Doghouse Records also released As Friends Rust digitally that year through one of the first digital music stores eMusic. As Friends Rust was also the first As Friends Rust release available in Japan, through a licensing deal worked out between Doghouse Records and Howling Bull Entertainment. The Japanese version of the extended play included six bonus tracks (taken from The Fists of Time and the split with Discount), and was released in October 1999 with a different artwork and layout, and under the title Eleven Songs (though its official title was simply As Friends Rust). Eleven Songs was later licensed to British record label Golf Records, and released on October 17, 2001, to coincide with one of the band's later tours.

== Promotion ==
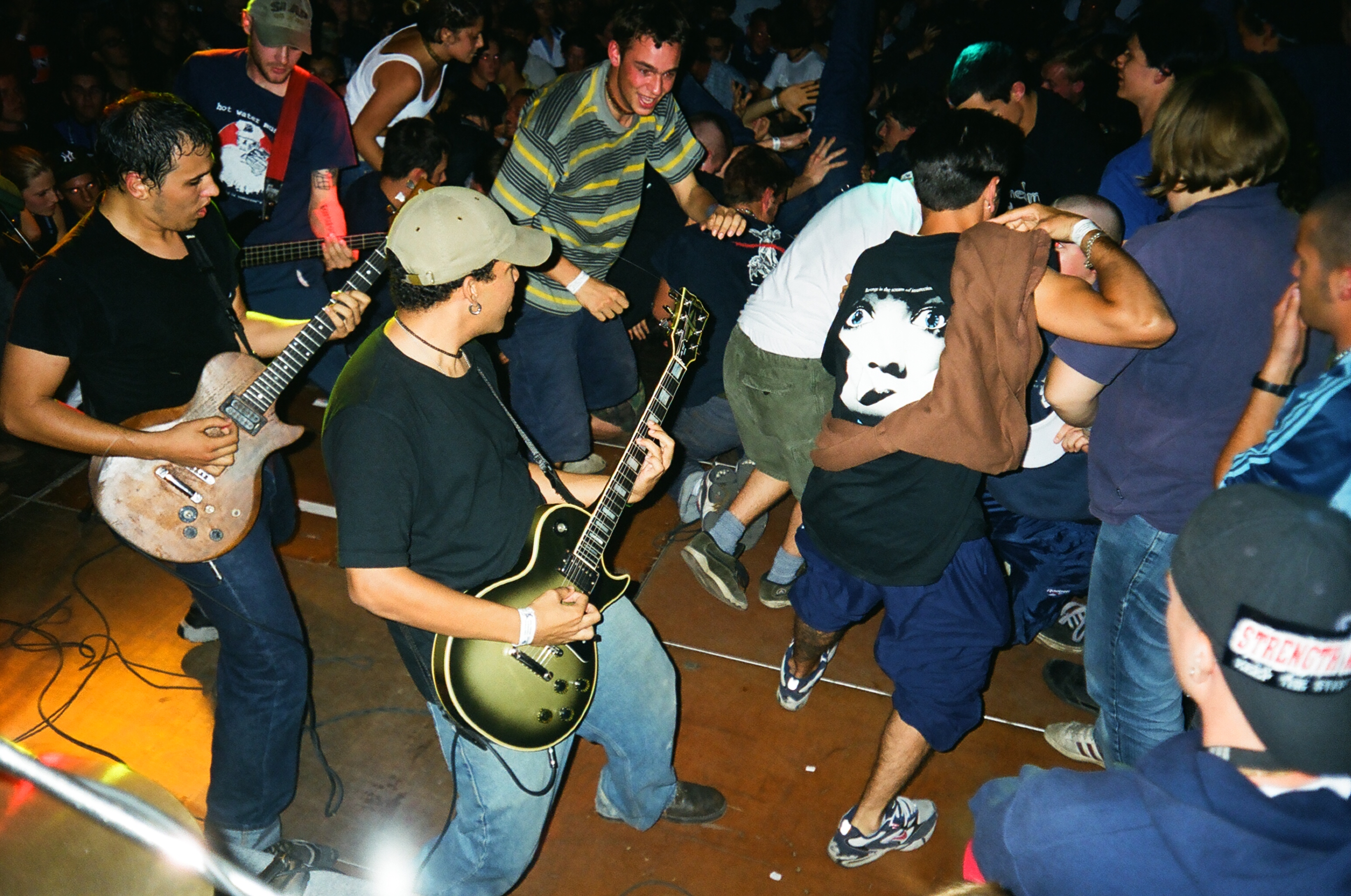
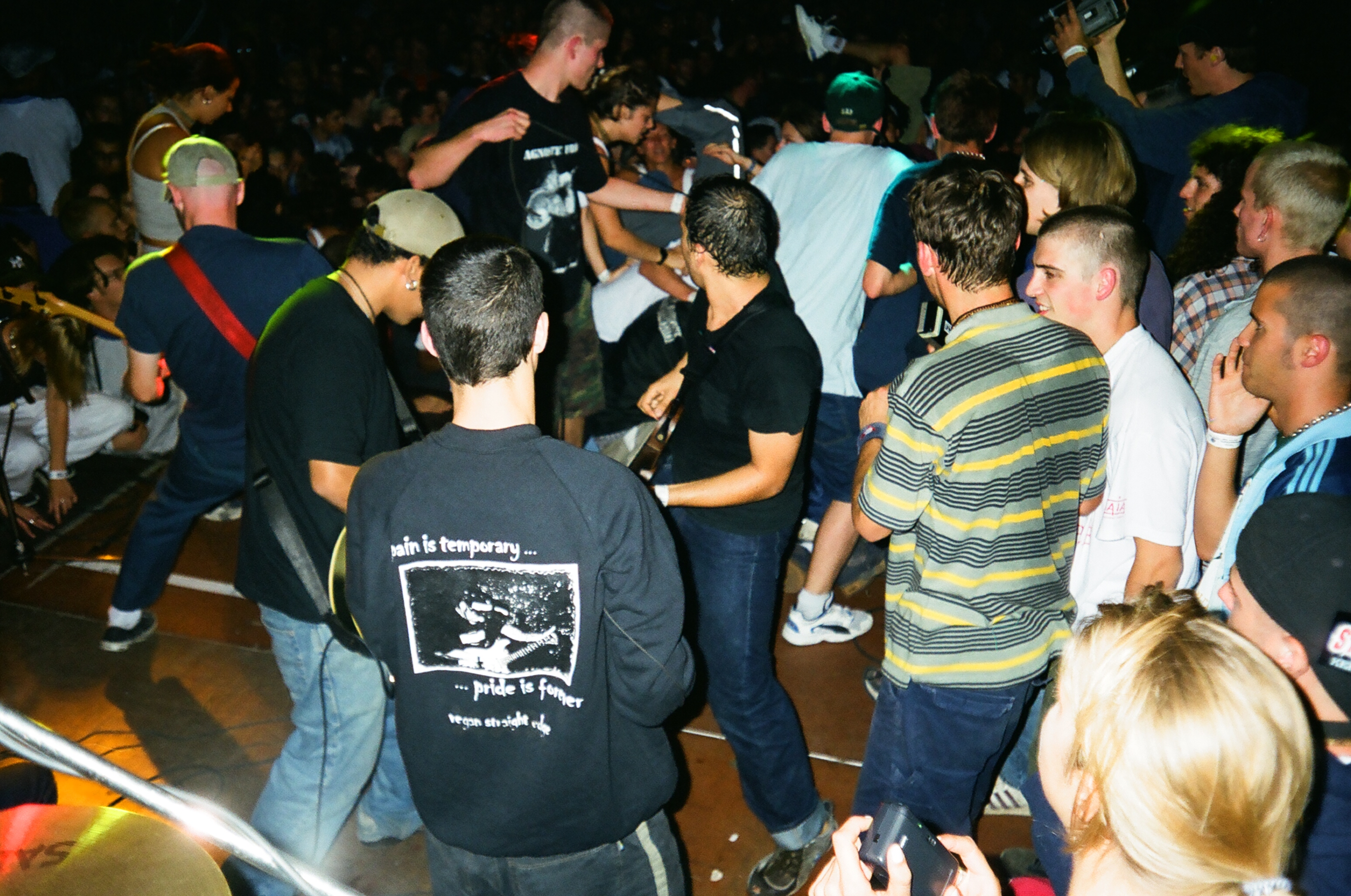
As Friends Rust headlining Ieper Hardcore Festival in Ypres, Belgium on August 20, 1999. After jumping into the audience to crowd surf, lead vocalist Damien Moyal disappeared under a moshpit while the band continued to play "Encante", only to resurface during a stage invasion by the end of the song.

In promotion of its new self-titled extended play, and with slightly better American distribution of its debut The Fists of Time through Good Life Recordings' American distributor Eulogy Recordings, As Friends Rust embarked on a three-week East Coast United States tour, spanning from June 13 to July 4, 1999, accompanied by acoustic musician Keith Welsh. The tour included stops to play at the Wilkes-Barre Summer Music Festival in Kingston, Pennsylvania and at Syracuse Hell Fest in Syracuse, New York. The band quickly followed up with a five-week European tour, spanning from mid-July to late August 1999, playing at such festivals as Good Life Midsummer Hardcore Festival in Kuurne, Belgium, Festival Hardcore in Sant Feliu de Guíxols, Spain and Ieper Hardcore Festival in Ypres, Belgium. Footage of the band's performance at Ieper Hardcore Festival was later included on Good Life Recordings' 2000 VHS release Good Life Recordings Presents: Good Life T.V. Video Sampler #1. The European tour was intended to be shared with Hot Water Music, but due to disagreements over top-billing, the two bands ended up booking separate tours. The incident caused a riff between the two bands that never fully healed, and lead As Friends Rust to include "Thanks to all of the Gainesville bands that were actually willing to play shows with us. There is division." in the liner notes of their upcoming eponymous extended play; a protesting reference to Hot Water Music's album No Division. In retaliation, the Hot Water Music side-project band Unitas included a diss track, "Molotodd Cocktail," on its debut album, Porch Life. As Friends Rust ended up headlining its own tour and playing a handful of cross-over shows with New Jersey melodic hardcore band Ensign and California melodic hardcore band Ignite.

In December 1999, As Friends Rust played Gainesvillefest in Gainesville, Florida. A tour with Syracuse, New York-based metalcore band The August Prophecy and Winter Park, Florida-based metalcore band Dragbody was booked and scheduled for December 1999 to January 2000, but cancelled at the last minute. As Friends Rust had hoped to record a full-length album in late 1999 or early 2000, but was unable to compose enough new material. During the first half of 2000, As Friends Rust went on mini tours with New Jersey hardcore band Fast Times and Washington D.C. hardcore band Good Clean Fun, and also played The Copper Sun Indie Records Winter Festival in Wilkes-Barre, Pennsylvania, the Detroit Festival, in Eastpointe, Michigan and Krazy Fest 3 in Louisville, Kentucky.

One June 22, 2000, Doghouse Records re-issued The Fists of Time on compact disc, 12-inch vinyl and digitally under the expanded title The Fists of Time: An Anthology of Short Fiction and Non-Fiction. The Doghouse Records re-issue added the songs "The First Song on the Tape You Make Her" (from the split with Discount) and the Circle Jerks cover "Operation", which had both previously been exclusive to Good Life Recordings and the European market. The Doghouse Records re-issue featured an all-new design and layout by Jason Page, though the CD jewel case spine included a typo in the release title, spelling it as The Fist of Time. With the Doghouse Records re-release, it was announced that all previous As Friends Rust releases on Good Life Recordings would be going out-of-print. The Fists of Time: An Anthology of Short Fiction and Non-Fiction, was an additional release, not counted towards the band's three-release contract with Doghouse Records (which counted As Friends Rust and two full-length albums).

As Friends Rust immediately embarked on a four-week tour promoting its two Doghouse Records releases, playing shows across the entire United States with Virginia hardcore band Strike Anywhere, spanning from May 29 to June 30, 2000. The tour included several cross-over shows with Glasseater, Mid Carson July and The Agency (the three of which were on tour together), as well as stops to play such festivals as Mixed Messages in Minneapolis, Minnesota, Pheer Festival, in College Park, Maryland and Hellfest 2K in Auburn, New York (which As Friends Rust did not play due to a last-minute change in venue).

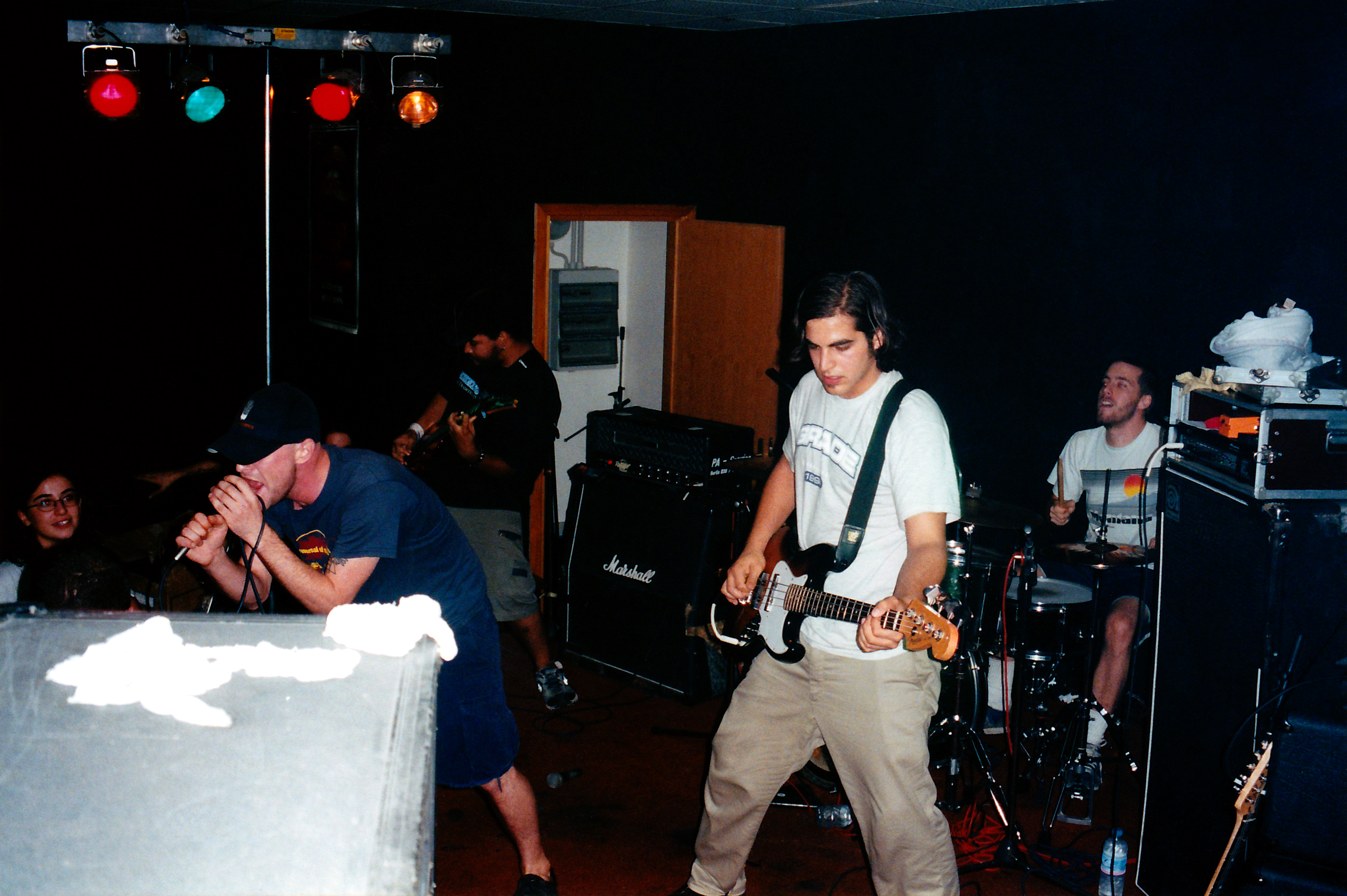
As Friends Rust performing at Plan 9 in Limena, Italy on September 16, 2000. One of the few shows when Kaleb Stewart took up lead vocals while Damien Moyal was sick. From left to right: Stewart, Joseph Simmons, Peter Bartsocas and Timothy Kirkpatrick.

In July 2000, Good Life Recordings invited As Friends Rust back to Europe for a week's worth of shows in Belgium and the Netherlands, including a performance at Dour Festival in Dour, Belgium and another at Metropolis Festival in Rotterdam, Netherlands. In mid-August 2000, the band returned to Europe for a full five-week tour, which included a handful of cross-over shows with Canadian melodic hardcore band Grade, New Jersey melodic hardcore band Ensign and Massachusetts post-hardcore band Garrison. This European tour also included stops at Ieper Hardcore Festival in Ypres, Belgium, TurboPunk Festival, in Poznań, Poland, Transmitter Festival in Hohenems, Austria and Complete MADness Festival in Potsdam, Germany. The band again planned to work on a full-length album in late 2000, having written a handful of songs described as "calmer and more depressing", but this material was eventually abandoned due to line-up changes.

Prior to leaving on its second 2000 European tour, Glayat and Kirkpatrick had announced their desire to leave the band upon returning home. But tensions during the tour ultimately caused a much bigger change in membership within As Friends Rust. On the way to Ieper Hardcore Festival, less than a week into the tour, the band was involved in a motor vehicle accident in Belgium, which badly damaged the van and resulted with Glayat suffering torn ligaments in his leg. With Glayat wearing a splint, the band continued on to half a week's worth of shows in the United Kingdom, following which the injured guitarist opted to fly back home instead of crossing back into Europe. Ex-guitarist Bartsocas, who was visiting Europe at the same time and had been travelling with the band, filled the vacant guitarist position for the next four weeks of shows.

Three weeks later, Moyal suffered from laryngitis and lost his voice, leading Stewart to switch from bass guitar to lead vocals, and Bartsocas temporarily filling in as bass guitarist. Moyal and Simmons called ex-Culture, ex-Morning Again and ex-Crucible bass guitarist Christopher "Floyd" Beckham (Glayat's at-the-time roommate) from Europe, asking him to join As Friends Rust as its new guitarist upon returning home, much to Stewart's dismay, leading the latter to quit the band. Moyal and Stewart were initially to stay over in Europe following As Friends Rust's tour, for a second tour with their other band Bridgeburne R, but Moyal was forced to find a new bass guitarist for both bands. Glayat and Kirkpatrick went on to play in Moments in Grace, while Stewart joined The Sheryl Cro(w) Mags and started Grey Goose.

== Critical reception ==
Professional ratings
Review scores
Source	Rating
4Emo	7/10 stars
Allschools Network	9/10 stars
CORE Ground	Positive
Delusions of Adequacy	Positive
Fracture	Positive
HeartattaCk	Positive
Hit List	Positive
IMPACT Press	Positive
Ink 19	Positive
Ink 19	Positive
Lost at Sea Magazine	Positive
Maximumrocknroll	Mixed
Mutant Renegade	Positive
Ox-Fanzine	Positive
Punk News	Positive
Punk Planet	Positive
Punk Rocks	Positive
Reflections	Positive
Slug and Lettuce	Positive

As Friends Rust received mostly positive critical acclaim upon release. As Friends Rust's style was described by critics as fast and uptempo emotional hardcore, aggressive and powerful melodic hardcore, emotion-drenched post-hardcore, punkcore, powerhouse punk rock, melodic punk, post-punk, and aggressive rock.

The band was often categorized as having Washington D.C. hardcore influences, East Coast straight-edge hardcore influences, and the Gainesville sound. Like in reviews of The Fists of Time, the band was quickly compared to fellow Gainesville melodic hardcore band Hot Water Music. Other comparisons were drawn to Dag Nasty, Gorilla Biscuits, Turning Point, Avail, J Church, Rites of Spring, Naked Raygun, Jawbreaker, 411, Grade, Planes Mistaken for Stars, Fuel, Henry Rollins, as well as to the band members' previous bands Culture, Morning Again, Shai Hulud and Roosevelt.

The music on As Friends Rust was noted as lighter and more positive than The Fists of Time, with beautiful, yet crushing harmonies and hooks. Most reviewers noted the music as catchy and powerful; melodic, and with a lot of driving energy. It was also described as aggressive, loud, and fast, while Moyal's vocals were singled out as sentimental, addictive and anthem-like. Reviewers also praised Moyal's strong and intelligent lyrics, describing them as hard hitting, personal, positive, emotional, socially-triggered, and complex yet understandable. Reviewers also praised the innovative use of 8-inch vinyl for the Doghouse Records release."

== Track listing ==
Credits are adapted from the EP's liner notes.

No.	Title	Lyrics	Music	Length
1.	"Half Friend Town"	Moyal	Kirkpatrick; Simmons; Stewart; Glayat	2:17
2.	"Like Strings (Spell It With a K)"	Moyal	Kirkpatrick; Simmons; Stewart; Glayat	2:15
3.	"Fire on 8th and 3rd"	Moyal	Kirkpatrick; Simmons; Stewart; Glayat	0:12
4.	"Coffee Black"	Moyal	Kirkpatrick; Simmons; Stewart; Glayat	3:18
5.	"Scapegoat Wets the Whistle"	Moyal	Kirkpatrick; Simmons; Stewart; Glayat	3:43
Total length:				11:50

European bonus tracks
No.	Title	Lyrics	Music	Length
6.	"[silence]"			1:01
7.	"Operation"	Lehrer; Rogerson	Lehrer; Rogerson	1:40
Total length:				14:26

== Personnel ==
Credits are adapted from the EP's liner notes.

As Friends Rust

- Damien Moyal – lead vocals
- Joseph Simmons – guitar
- James Glayat – guitar
- Kaleb Stewart – bass guitar and backing vocals
- Timothy Kirkpatrick – drums

Production

- Rob McGregor – recording engineer, mixer and producer at Goldentone Studios
- As Friends Rust – co-mixer and co-producer
- Damien Moyal – artwork and design
- Kaleb Stewart – artwork and design (Doghouse Records version)
- Jason Page – photography, design and layout (Doghouse Records version)
- Nicholas Forneris – photography (Good Life Recordings version)
- Vincent Kempeneers – photography (Good Life Recordings version)

== Release history ==
Release formats for As Friends Rust
Region	Date	Label	Format	Catalog
Belgium	July 1999	Good Life Recordings	CD	GL043
Belgium	July 1999	Good Life Recordings	2x7-inch Vinyl	GL043
United States	September 17, 1999	Doghouse Records	CD	DOG064
United States	September 17, 1999	Doghouse Records	8-inch Vinyl	DOG064
United States	September 17, 1999	Doghouse Records	Digital	DOG064
