= Camden Underworld, London – 16 November 2001 =

2002 live video album by As Friends Rust and Strike Anywhere

Video by As Friends Rust and Strike Anywhere
- Released: December 17, 2002
- Recorded: November 16, 2001
- Venue: Underworld, Camden Town, London, England
- Genre: Melodic hardcore; emotional hardcore; punk rock
- Length: 68:00
- Label: Punkervision
- Director: Peter Wells
- Producer: Peter Wells; Margaret Wells

As Friends Rust chronology
A Young Trophy Band in the Parlance of Our Times (2002)	Camden Underworld, London – 16 November 2001 (2002)	Greatest Hits? (2014)

Strike Anywhere video chronology
Change is a Sound (2001)	Live at Camden Underworld (2002)	Exit English (2003)

Camden Underworld, London – 16 November 2001 (colloquially referred to as Live at Camden Underworld) is a split live video album by Gainesville, Florida-based melodic hardcore band As Friends Rust and Richmond, Virginia-based punk rock band Strike Anywhere. The concert was filmed on November 16, 2001 at the Underworld in Camden Town, London, England. The event was part of a five-week European and United Kingdom tour shared by the two bands while promoting their debut full-length albums: As Friends Rust's Won (released through Doghouse Records and Defiance Records) and Strike Anywhere's Change Is a Sound (released through Jade Tree).

The live footage was first edited and uploaded online through PunkBand TV in late January 2002. It was later released by Punkervision on DVD and VHS on December 17, 2002. The home video was released three months after As Friends Rust ceased to exist; the band having changed name to Salem in September 2002.

== Background and production ==
In 2001, both As Friends Rust and Strike Anywhere recorded their first full-length albums. The two bands had previously toured the United States together the year prior, during a four-week tour that spanned from May 29 to June 30, 2000. In April 2001, Strike Anywhere recorded its album Change Is a Sound, which was later released on August 14, 2001 through American record label Jade Tree. In July 2001, As Friends Rust recorded its album Won, which was later released in the United States on October 23, 2001 through American record label Doghouse Records; it was also licensed to German record label Defiance Records for release in Europe and the United Kingdom on October 15, 2001.

In promotion of their first full-length albums, As Friends Rust and Strike Anywhere re-teamed for a five-week tour of Europe and the United Kingdom, which spanned from October 29 to December 5, 2001. Peoria, Illinois-based post-hardcore band Planes Mistaken for Stars joined the two bands for the first leg of the European tour. This later turned out to be vocalist Damien Moyal's final tour with As Friends Rust, as he quit the band three months later.

Midway through the tour, on November 16, 2001, As Friends Rust, Strike Anywhere and Austrian punk rock band Red Lights Flash played a sold-out show at the Underworld in Camden Town, London, England. As Friends Rust had previously played the venue twice; the first time on July 30, 1999, and then again on August 21, 2000 with Canadian melodic hardcore band Grade; and would play it again during its reunion tour on August 18, 2008.

The highlight performance was filmed using a multi-camera setup by Peter Wells, Margaret Wells, Philip Wells and Ray Liffen. The team of videographers operated the website PunkBand TV, where they uploaded and shared its live footage of independent bands that played in London. The Wells' edited As Friends Rust's, Strike Anywhere's and Red Lights Flash's live footage in early January 2002 and posted two songs from each band on the PunkBand TV website later that same month. The videos included "Coffee Black" by As Friends Rust and "No Reply" and "P(owerful) C(hoices)" by Red Lights Flash. The chemistry shared between As Friends Rust and Strike Anywhere on tour also gave talk to releasing a split single of the two bands, but it never materialized.

Later in 2002, the Wells' decided to start a home video distribution company to sell the shows they filmed and formed Punkervision. As Friends Rust and Strike Anywhere were selected as the second video production for release by Punkervision (Red Lights Flash's footage was not included on the home video). The complete concerts were fully edited and released on video home system and digital video disc on December 17, 2002. The two formats were available in both PAL and NTSC encoding systems. Although Strike Anywhere was still an active band at the time of the video's release, As Friends Rust had had a considerable change in membership and opted to change name to Salem in September 2002.

Professional ratings
Review scores
Source	Rating
AMP	Positive
Law of Inertia	Positive
Punk News	4.5/5 stars
Rocktober	Positive

== Critical reception ==
Camden Underworld, London – 16 November 2001 received overall positive critical acclaim upon release. Critics praised the quality of the video and audio footage, the multi-camera setup and the professional editing. The user-friendly menu on the DVD was also complimented but some mentioned that bonus features would have been a nice addition. As Friends Rust and Strike Anywhere were both lauded for playing energetic and captivating shows.

== Track listing ==
Credits are adapted from the video's liner notes.

No.	Title	Lyrics	Music	Artist	Length
1.	"Like Strings (Spell It with a K)"	Moyal	Kirkpatrick; Simmons; Stewart; Glayat	As Friends Rust
2.	"Morningleaver"	Moyal	Simmons; Beckham; Amador; Vernon	As Friends Rust
3.	"Half Friend Town"	Moyal	Kirkpatrick; Simmons; Stewart; Glayat	As Friends Rust
4.	"Perfect Stranglers"	Moyal	Simmons; Beckham; Swain; Rankine	As Friends Rust
5.	"The First Song on the Tape You Make Her"	Moyal	Kirkpatrick; Simmons; Stewart; Bartsocas	As Friends Rust
6.	"Fourteen or So"	Moyal	Simmons; Beckham; Swain; Rankine	As Friends Rust
7.	"Ruffian"	Moyal	Olmino; Gomez; Crum	As Friends Rust
8.	"Laughing Out Loud"	Moyal	Simmons; Beckham; Swain; Rankine	As Friends Rust
9.	"Encante"	Moyal	Olmino; Gomez; Crum	As Friends Rust
10.	"Coffee Black"	Moyal	Kirkpatrick; Simmons; Stewart; Glayat	As Friends Rust
11.	"Home Is Where the Heart Aches"	Moyal	Kirkpatrick; Simmons; Stewart; Tarpley	As Friends Rust
12.	"You're Fired"	Barnett	Sherwood; Smith; Petrie; Kane	Strike Anywhere
13.	"Cassandratic Equation"	Barnett	Sherwood; Smith; Petrie; Kane	Strike Anywhere
14.	"Timebomb Generation"	Barnett	Sherwood; Smith; Petrie; Kane	Strike Anywhere
15.	"S.S.T."	Barnett	Sherwood; Smith; Petrie; Kane	Strike Anywhere
16.	"Earthbound"	Barnett	Sherwood; Smith; Petrie; Kane	Strike Anywhere
17.	"Riot of Words"	Barnett	Sherwood; Smith; Petrie; Kane	Strike Anywhere
18.	"Refusal"	Barnett	Sherwood; Smith; Petrie; Kane	Strike Anywhere
19.	"Chorus of One"	Barnett	Sherwood; Smith; Petrie; Kane	Strike Anywhere
20.	"Sunset on 32nd"	Barnett	Sherwood; Smith; Petrie; Kane	Strike Anywhere
21.	"My Design"	Barnett	Sherwood; Smith; Petrie; Kane	Strike Anywhere
Total length:					68:00

== Personnel ==
Credits are adapted from the video's liner notes.

As Friends Rust

- Damien Moyal – lead vocals
- Joseph Simmons – guitar
- Christopher Beckham – guitar and backing vocals
- Thomas Rankine – bass guitar
- Zachary Swain – drums

Strike Anywhere

- Thomas Barnett – lead vocals
- Matt C. Sherwood – guitar
- Matt Smith – guitar
- Garth Petrie – bass guitar
- Eric Kane – drums

Production

- Peter Wells – producer, director, cinematographer, editor
- Margaret Wells – producer, cinematographer, sound recordist
- Philip Wells – cinematographer
- Ray Liffen – cinematographer

== Release history ==
Release formats for Camden Underworld, London – 16 November 2001
Region	Date	Label	Format	Catalog
United Kingdom	December 17, 2002	Punkervision	VHS	HUP002V
United Kingdom	December 17, 2002	Punkervision	DVD (PAL)	HUP002-DP
United Kingdom	December 17, 2002	Punkervision	DVD (NTSC)	HUP002-DN
