= Rehasher =

American punk rock band

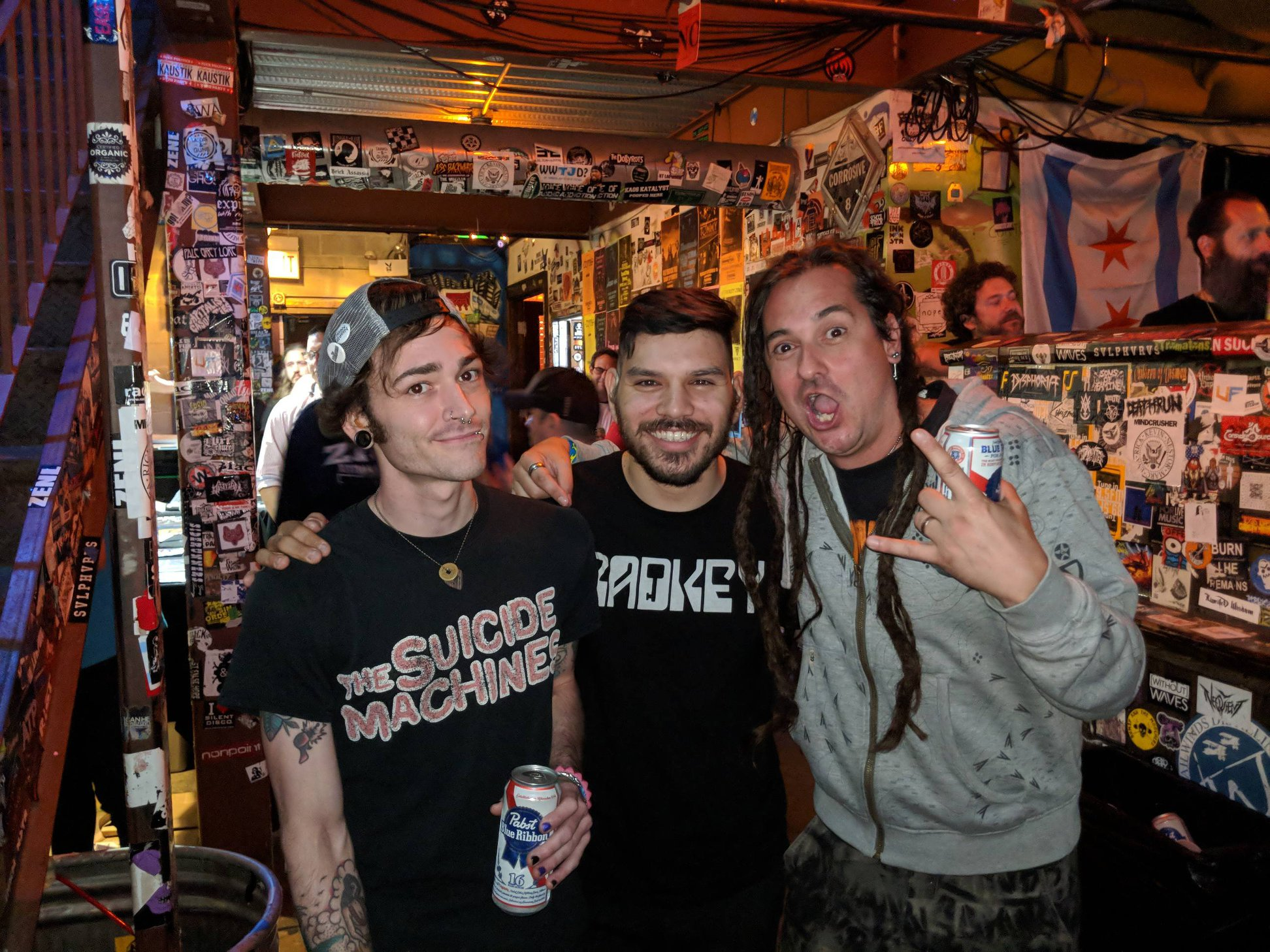
- Rehasher at Reggies Rock Club in Chicago, Illinois on August 24, 2018.

Background information
- Origin: Gainesville, Florida, U.S.
- Genres: Punk rock; melodic hardcore; pop punk
- Years active: 2002–present
- Label: No Idea
- Members: Roger Lima; Richard Klinghoffer; Tony Farah; Alex Klausner
- Past members: Ryan Geis; Gui Amador; Jake Crown
- Website: rehasher.com

Rehasher is a punk rock band based in Gainesville, Florida, signed to No Idea Records. Although started as a band, Rehasher became the solo side project of ska punk band Less Than Jake bass player/back up and lead singer Roger Lima as their lead singer and rhythm guitarist. The band's first line-up included Manganelli and Ryan Geis sharing lead vocals and guitars, bass guitarist Gui Amador (formerly of As Friends Rust) and drummer Jake Crown.

Rehasher's third album Make the Noise was released on July 10, 2015. Following the release of Make the Noise, the band added bassist Tony Farah, and drummer Alex Klausner to resume touring. Work on new recordings began in late 2017. In 2021 the band released a covers album.

== Members ==
Current lineup

- Roger Lima – lead and backing vocals, rhythm guitar
- Tony Farah – bass guitar, lead and backing vocals
- Alex Klausner – drums, backing vocals

Former members

- Ryan Geis – lead guitar, backing vocals
- Gui Amador – bass guitar
- Jake Crown – drums, backing vocals

== Discography ==
=== Albums ===
- Off Key Melodies (2004), released in 2004 on No Idea Records.
- High Speed Access to My Brain (2009), released August 28, 2009; vinyl version on Paper + Plastick, CD version on Moathouse Records.
- Clock Smash! (2015) released June 2 on Moathouse Records. Vinyl version on Saint November records.
- Make the Noise (2015) released July 10 on Moathouse Records Vinyl version on Moathouse Records.
- Tasty Slices, Vol. 1 (2021), released on Moathouse Records, with a vinyl release from Smartpunk Records.

=== Other songs ===
- "PVC" (exclusive to PureVolume and MySpace).
