= Chip Walbert =

American musician (born 1979)

Richard Walbert
- Also known as: Chip Walbert; xCHIPxSEM; DJ Chip Rock
- Born: Richard Charles Walbert II; January 16, 1979 (age 47); Tampa, Florida, U.S.
- Origin: Miami, Florida
- Genres: Hardcore punk; melodic hardcore; metallic hardcore; post-hardcore
- Occupations: Musician; singer; songwriter; disc jockey
- Instruments: Guitar; bass guitar; vocals
- Years active: 1997–present
- Labels: Equal Vision; Eulogy; Good Life; Revelation; Surprise Attack; Think Fast!; Triple Crown
- Member of: Phantom Drive
- Formerly of: All Hell Breaks Loose; Best Wishes; Dance Floor Justice; Destro; More Than Ever; Morning Again; No Excuses; On Bodies; Target Nevada; Until the End; Where Fear and Weapons Meet

Richard Charles "Chip" Walbert II (born January 16, 1979) is an American musician, songwriter, and disc jockey, originally from Tampa, Florida, but long-established in Miami, Florida. He is best known for his time playing guitar in the hardcore punk and metalcore bands Where Fear and Weapons Meet, Until the End, Target Nevada, On Bodies, and Morning Again. He also played in the bands Destro, All Hell Breaks Loose, Dance Floor Justice, Phantom Drive, No Excuses, and More Than Ever.

== History ==
Walbert was born on January 16, 1979, in Tampa, Florida, to Richard Charles Walbert and his wife Lynn (née Sannino). He has two siblings, a brother Alex and a sister Brittany. His father was a doctor who eventually became Co-Director of Emergency Services at Baptist Health South Florida's South Miami Hospital.

Walbert became active in the South Florida hardcore punk scene in 1995, and started affiliating as straight edge that same year. He formed his first band, Destro, in 1997, with high school friends Roy Ugarte and Ariel Arro (who later played in Glasseater). When Destro went on a brief hiatus in 1998, he formed xMore Than Everx which only played a few shows. Destro started up again in late 1998, after drummer Ully and singer Manny left. New drummer Julio Marin (formerly of Promise No Tomorrow and later of Glasseater) joined, as did vocalist Kenn Marshall. The band recorded an extended play and a full length album, and played at such festivals as Hellfest 2K (2000), Furnace Fest (2000), and Hellfest 2001 (2001), before breaking up in 2002.

Walbert then formed All Hell Breaks Loose with members of Santa Sangre and Target Nevada. In 2002, Walbert also joined Where Fear and Weapons Meet and Until the End, playing second guitar alongside John Wylie (formerly of Morning Again). In 2003, Walbert started Dance Floor Justice with Alex Leon (who also played in Target Nevada, All Hell Breaks Loose, and Hockey Temper). In November 2004, All Hell Breaks Loose's drummer Joe Lamadrid died suddenly, which prompted the band to disband. Walbert then briefly played in Target Nevada. Between 2004-2005, Walbert and his wife Crystal Preston Walbert operated the record label Lotus Effect Records.

In 2006, he recruited Ariel Arro, Chad Kishick, and vocalist Damien Moyal for the band Best Wishes. He also played guitar in No Excuses, a Tallahassee-based straight edge hardcore band. In July 2011, On Bodies (then cromprising Damien Moyal and Richard Thurston) recruited Walbert, who, in turn, enlisted fellow Florida-based drummer Julio Marin and guitarist Chad Kishick (formerly of Shai Hulud and Where Fear and Weapons Meet). He next filled in on Morning Again's tours in 2012 and 2014. Between 2017 and 2019, Walbert was the guitarist for the band Phantom Drive. All Hell Breaks Loose reunited in 2023 and are set to play a sole performance on September 8, 2023 at the South Florida Hardcore Unity festival.

Walbert also performs as a disc jockey under the stage name DJ Chip Rock. Since 1997, he has held weekly nights at such venues as Hot Wheel Skating Center, Super Wheels Skating Center, Miami Roller Rink, Galaxy Skateway, and Astro Skating Center, all located in Miami, Florida. He is also a collector of band t-shirts, especially of 1990s hardcore bands, and was the editor of The South Florida Music Scene Past and Present webzine as well as the co-editor and contributor to xStuck in the Pastx webzine.

== Related bands ==
- Destro: 1997–1998, 1998–2002
- xMore Than Everx: 1998
- All Hell Breaks Loose: 2001–2004, 2006–2008, 2016, 2023
- Where Fear and Weapons Meet: 2002–2004, 2012
- Until the End: 2002–2005
- Dance Floor Justice: 2002–2003, 2004–2008
- Target Nevada: 2005
- Best Wishes: 2005–2006
- No Excuses: 2007–2008
- On Bodies: 2011–2014
- Morning Again: 2012, 2014
- Phantom Drive: 2017–2019
