= On Bodies =

American hardcore band

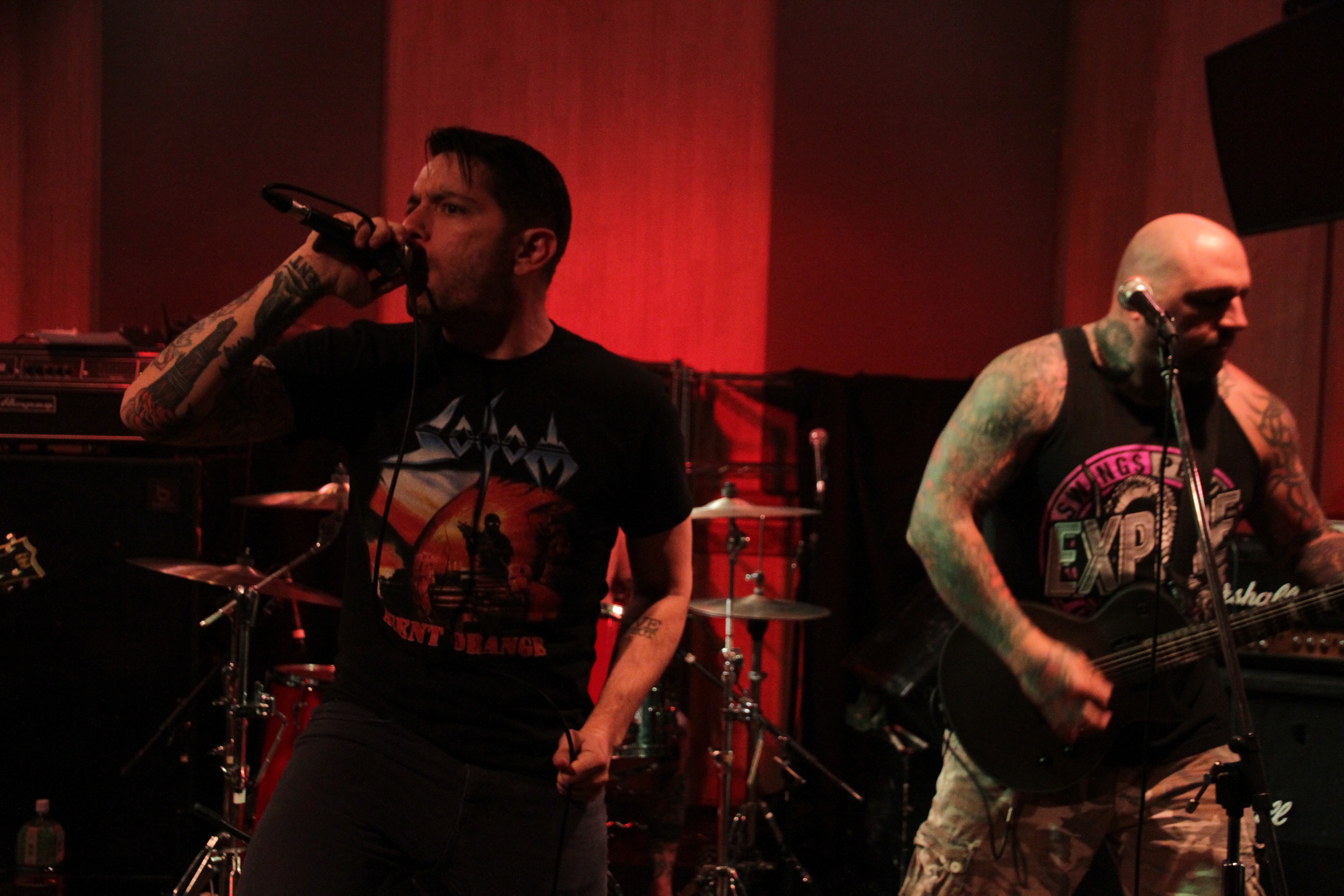
- On Bodies performing at Nishi-Ogikubo Flat in Tokyo, Japan on March 5, 2015. From left to right: Damien Moyal and Richard Thurston.

Background information
- Also known as: Onbodies
- Origin: Cincinnati, Ohio, United States
- Genres: Hardcore punk
- Years active: 2009–2017
- Labels: American Enemy; Coffeebreath and Heartache; Cosmic Note; Demons Run Amok; Eulogy; Irish VooDoo
- Past members: Richard Thurston; Damien Moyal; Richard Walbert; Julio Marin; Chad Kishick; Joshua Williams; Zachary Colina; Joshua King; Boone Haley; Megan Schroer

On Bodies was an American hardcore punk band active from 2009 to 2017. Principally based in Cincinnati, Ohio, where the majority of its members resided, it also included members from Michigan, Florida, New Jersey, and Kentucky. The group was formed by guitarist, bass guitarist, drummer, backing vocalist, and principal songwriter Richard Thurston (formerly of Timescape Zero, Culture, Blood Has Been Shed, Diecast, One Nation Under, Terror, and Walls of Jericho), and vocalist and lyricist Damien Moyal (formerly of Culture, Shai Hulud, Morning Again, Bird of Ill Omen, As Friends Rust, Bridgeburne R, and Damien Done). The band later also included former members of Until the End, Where Fear and Weapons Meet, Glasseater, Destro, Mixtapes, and The Homeless Gospel Choir.

The band released three extended plays during its span: Planet Hospice in 2012 (Eulogy Recordings / American Enemy Records), The Long Con in 2013 (Coffeebreath and Heartache Records / Irish VooDoo Records), and Unremarkably Mortal in 2015 (Irish VooDoo Records). The last two extended plays were combined into a compilation album titled Unremarkably Mortal + The Long Con for the Japanese and European markets in 2015 (Cosmic Note / Demons Run Amok Entertainment). The band also produced music videos for the singles "Just Can't Win" (2012) and "Down and Doubt" (2015).

== History ==
On Bodies was formed by Cincinnati, Ohio–based guitarist, bass guitarist, drummer, backing vocalist, and principal songwriter Richard Thurston (formerly of Timescape Zero, Culture, Blood Has Been Shed, Diecast, One Nation Under, Terror, and Walls of Jericho), in August 2009. He immediately approached his former Culture bandmate, vocalist and lyricist Damien Moyal, who was then based in Ann Arbor, Michigan, and had since played in Shai Hulud, Morning Again, Bird of Ill Omen, As Friends Rust, Bridgeburne R, and Damien Done. However, the project laid dormant for two years until Thurston reached out to Moyal again to record vocals over the completed songs in the spring of 2011.

After tracking nine songs as a two-piece, with Thurston playing all of the instruments, the band was signed to ex-Culture and Morning Again bandmate John Wylie's Florida-based record label, Eulogy Recordings in mid-2011. The band's debut extended play (originally recorded as a demo), Planet Hospice, was eventually released on February 14, 2012, on compact disc and digitally via Eulogy Recordings, while American Enemy Records issued a 10-inch vinyl version.

In July 2011, On Bodies recruited Miami, Florida–based guitarist Richard Walbert (formerly of Destro, Where Fear and Weapons Meet and Until the End, and later of Morning Again), who, in turn, enlisted fellow Florida-based drummer Julio Marin (formerly of Destro and Glasseater), and guitarist Chad Kishick (formerly of Shai Hulud and Where Fear and Weapons Meet), in August 2011; Thurston assumed bass guitarist duties in the expanded line-up. Moyal, Walbert and Kishick had also previously played together in the short-lived project Best Wishes.

The full band debuted at Planet Hospice's release shows in late February 2012. The concerts were filmed and edited by Joshua Call and Andre Hopman, of the film production company Film Free Youth, into a music video for the single "Just Can't Win", which premiered on March 9, 2012. As a full band, On Bodies recorded five songs for their sophomore extended play, The Long Con, in July 2012. It was finally issued, after some delay, on May 16, 2013, on 12-inch vinyl through German record label Coffeebreath and Heartache Records, and much later, on March 2, 2015, again on 12-inch vinyl, through American record label Irish VooDoo Records. By the spring of 2014, the three Florida-based members were dismissed in the hope of finding a more localized, Midwest-based membership for concerts.

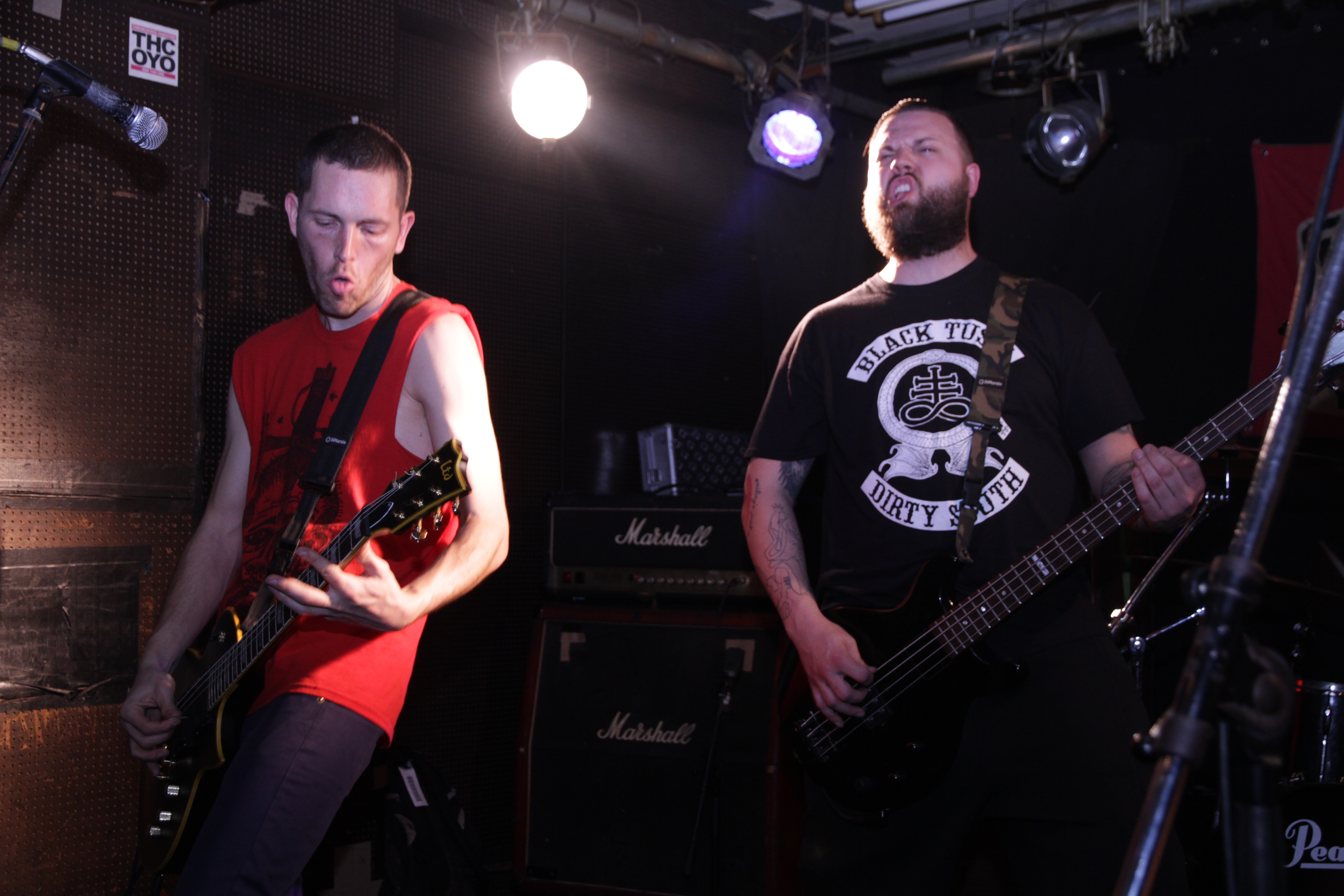
On Bodies performing at Hatsudai Wall in Tokyo, Japan on March 8, 2015. From left to right: Zachary Colina and Joshua King.

Back as a two-piece, Thurston and Moyal recorded the band's third extended play, Unremarkably Mortal, in October 2014, before setting out to recruit new members. For the band's new line-up, Thurston approached Cincinnati-based guitarist Zachary Colina, who had previously played in several bands with him, including One Nation Under, Against, Still Crossed, and Anthem. With an opportunity to tour Asia, the band quickly recruited New Jersey–based drummer Joshua Williams (formerly of Culture and As Friends Rust, and then a member of Morning Again), and Cincinnati-based bass guitarist and backing vocalist Joshua King (formerly of Suffocate Faster and Recon); Thurston assumed guitarist and backing vocalist duties in this formation. This line-up appeared in the music video for "Down and Doubt", which was released on February 17, 2015, to promote Unremarkably Mortal.

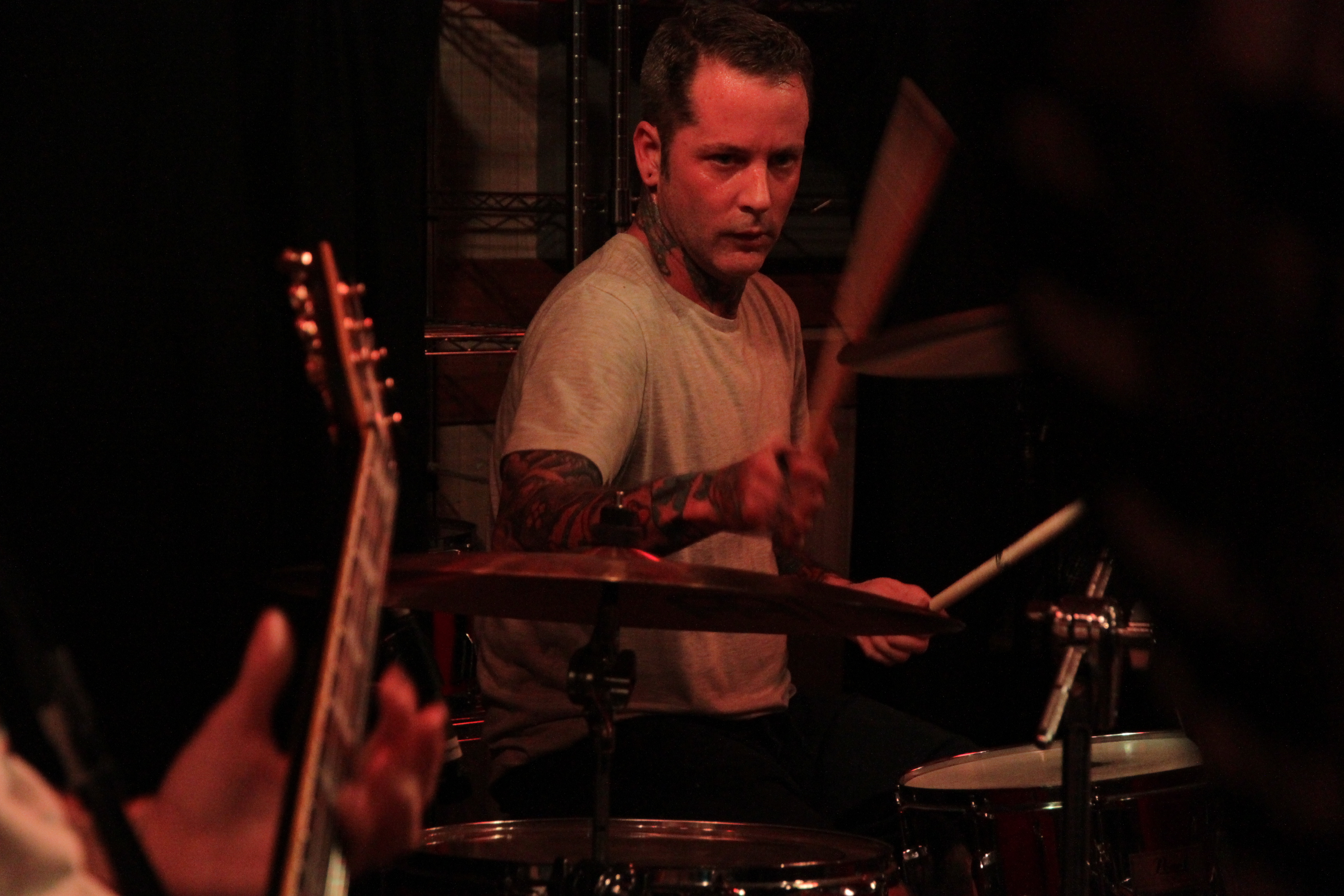
On Bodies performing at Nishi-Ogikubo Flat in Tokyo, Japan on March 5, 2015. Pictured: Joshua Williams.

In March 2015, On Bodies embarked on a Japanese tour, promoting a compilation of its second and third extended plays, Unremarkably Mortal + The Long Con, released on compact disc through Cosmic Note on February 25, 2015. Cosmic Note also included the song "Prevail" and the music video for "Down and Doubt" on its compact disc and digital video disc compilation Cosmic Note 2015. The band self-released the digital edition of Unremarkably Mortal on March 11, 2015, while Irish VooDoo Records eventually released a 7-inch vinyl on August 3, 2015.

Later in 2015, Thurston and Colina recruited Covington, Kentucky–based drummer Boone Haley (formerly of Mixtapes), and Cincinnati-based bass guitarist Megan Schroer (who later played in The Homeless Gospel Choir). Colina, Haley and Schroer were then playing together in the band Head Collector, while Colina and Schroer also collaborated in the band Boys (which featured other members of Mixtapes). German record label Demons Run Amok Entertainment re-issued the compilation Unremarkably Mortal + The Long Con on 12-inch vinyl on September 25, 2015. The band embarked on mini-tours of the United States in November and December 2015. Thurston and Moyal later recorded material for a fourth extended play in April 2017, but it was never released.

== Members ==
Final lineup

- Richard Thurston – guitar, bass guitar, drums, backing vocals (2009–2017)
- Damien Moyal – lead vocals (2009–2017)
- Zachary Colina – guitar (2015–2017)

Former members and touring musicians

- Richard Walbert – guitar (2011–2014)
- Julio Marin – drums (2011–2014)
- Chad Kishick – guitar (2011–2014)
- Joshua Williams – drums (2015)
- Joshua King – bass guitar, backing vocals (2015)
- Boone Haley – drums (2015–2016)
- Megan Schroer – bass guitar (2015–2016)

=== Timeline ===
- ^{Note that the Studio album and EP bars represent the release dates, not the recording dates; membership often changed between the two events.}

== Discography ==
EPs

- Planet Hospice (2012, Eulogy Recordings / American Enemy Records)
- The Long Con (2013, Coffeebreath and Heartache Records / Irish VooDoo Records)
- Unremarkably Mortal (2015, Irish VooDoo Records)

Compilation albums

- Unremarkably Mortal + The Long Con (2015, Cosmic Note / Demons Run Amok Entertainment)
