= Target Nevada (band) =

- Origin: Miami, Florida, United States
- Genres: Hardcore Punk; Metalcore
- Years active: 2002–2005
- Labels: Surprise Attack Records
- Members: Alan Landsman: Vocals; Jason Boyer: Guitar; Alex Leon: Guitar; Amado Ventura: Bass; Rene Leon: Drums
- Past members: Matt Bivetto: Vocals; Adrian Rodriguez: Bass; Marciel Quiros: Bass; Nahuel Gauna: Drums; Richard Walbert: Guitar

Target Nevada was a super-group composed of members from Bird of Ill Omen, Poison the Well, Until the End, All Hell Breaks Loose, Deadweight and Dance Floor Justice.

In 2004, they released their CD single "Something Nasty", which was later followed by a full-length album.

== Discography ==
- The Young Andy Sixkiller Chronicles (2003)
- Something Nasty (2004)
- No, We Don't Want To Play Your Shitty Fest (2004)
