= As Tradition Dies Slowly =

Studio album by Morning Again
- Released: June 30, 1998
- Recorded: February 1, 1998 – February 12, 1998
- Studio: Studio 13, Deerfield Beach, Florida, United States
- Genre: Metalcore
- Length: 35:40
- Label: Revelation
- Producer: Jeremy Staska

Morning Again chronology
| The Cleanest War (1996) | As Tradition Dies Slowly (1998) | To Die a Bitter Death (1998) |

As Tradition Dies Slowly is the debut full-length album by American metalcore band Morning Again. It was released on compact disc and 12-inch vinyl by American record label Revelation Records on June 30, 1998. It was the band's first release to enter music charts, reaching number 22 and spending nine weeks on CMJ New Music Report's Loud Rock chart, and reaching number 50 on FMQB's Metal Detector Pure Spins chart. The album was subsequently re-issued digitally by Revelation Records, and was later repressed on 12-inch vinyl on July 9, 2015, and again on January 22, 2019.

== Background ==
Professional ratings
Review scores
| Source | Rating |
|---|---|
| Full Contact Magazine | Positive |
| Lollipop Magazine | Negative |
| LoudNet | Positive |
| Ox-Fanzine | Positive |
| Rocktober | Positive |
| Scene Point Blank | 7.5/10 stars |
| Suburban Voice | Mixed |
| Think Again | Positive |

=== Recording ===
The album was the band's first release on Revelation Records, which had shown interest in the band after hearing early material recorded with original vocalist Damien Moyal (The Cleanest War and Hand of Hope). As Tradition Dies Slowly's writing and recording sessions, and following promotional tours, featured several member changes, leading the band to ultimately break up in October 1998, only four months after the album's release. The band began writing music for As Tradition Dies Slowly in March 1997, with guitarist and principal songwriter John Wylie, drummer Louie Long, vocalist Kevin Byers, bass guitarist Gerardo Villarroel and newly recruited guitarist Joseph Simmons. Long was replaced by Matthew Thomas in April 1997.

The album was recorded from February 1–12, 1998, with producer Jeremy Staska at Studio 13 in Deerfield Beach, Florida, where the band had recorded nearly all of its prior material since 1996. The session included the recording of seven new songs ("Stones", "Seasons", "Murder You Call War", "As Tradition Dies Slowly", "Free to Decide", "Words of a Chosen Few" and "Rights of Passage"), and three previously released songs that were re-recorded for the album ("Uncivil Hands", "Martyr" and "Dictation of Beauty"). The song "Martyr" had previously been recorded in September 1996 and appeared on the band's split 7-inch vinyl with Shoulder and on the Martyr extended play; "Uncivil Hands" had previously been recorded in December 1996 and appeared on the extended play My Statement of Life in a Dying World; and "Dictation of Beauty" had previously been recorded in August 1997 and appeared on the band's split 7-inch vinyl and CD with 25 ta Life.

Only three weeks after the album was recorded, Simmons was fired and replaced by Stephen Looker, who had just quit both Culture and As Friends Rust to join Morning Again. As a result, Simmons moved to Gainesville, Florida and joined both Culture and As Friends Rust, taking up Looker's former position.

=== Promotion ===
In promotion of the release, Morning Again toured the United States and Europe several times between November 1997 and October 1998, accompanied by such bands as Converge, Agnostic Front, Today Is the Day, Keepsake, Disembodied, Vision, Maximum Penalty, Another Victim, Length of Time and For the Love of... The band also performed at notable festivals like Syracuse Hardcore Festival in Syracuse, New York, Michigan Festival in Detroit, Michigan, Hardcore Festival in Rijen, Netherlands, Radix Tierrechts Festival in Speyer, Germany and Broken Silence Hardcore Festival in Schorndorf, Germany. The band was also scheduled to perform at CMJ Music Marathon in November 1998, but cancelled their appearance when breaking up weeks before.

== Track listing ==
Credits are adapted from the album's liner notes.

As Tradition Dies Slowly track listing
| No. | Title | Lyrics | Music | Length |
|---|---|---|---|---|
| 1. | "Stones" | Wylie | Wylie; Simmons | 3:57 |
| 2. | "Seasons" | Wylie | Wylie; Simmons | 3:41 |
| 3. | "Murder You Call War" | Wylie | Wylie; Simmons | 4:44 |
| 4. | "As Tradition Dies Slowly" | Wylie | Wylie; Simmons | 3:05 |
| 5. | "Uncivil Hands" | Wylie | Wylie | 3:17 |
| 6. | "Dictation of Beauty" | Villarroel | Wylie; Simmons | 3:22 |
| 7. | "Free to Decide" | Wylie | Wylie; Simmons | 3:42 |
| 8. | "Martyr" | Wylie | Wylie | 2:37 |
| 9. | "Words of a Chosen Few" | Wylie | Wylie; Simmons | 3:36 |
| 10. | "Rights of Passage" | Wylie | Wylie; Simmons | 3:39 |
| Total length: | | | | 35:40 |

== Personnel ==
Credits are adapted from the album's liner notes.

Morning Again

- Kevin Byers – lead vocals
- John Wylie – guitar
- Joseph Simmons – guitar
- Stephen Looker – guitar (credit only, did not perform on the recording)
- Gerardo Villarroel – bass guitar
- Matthew Thomas – drums

Production

- Jeremy Staska – recording engineer, mixer and producer at Studio 13
- Alan Douches – mastering engineer at West West Side Music
- Richie Birkenhead – artwork and design
- Jason Upright – photography
- John Polosi – legal representation

== Release history ==
Release formats for As Tradition Dies Slowly
| Region | Date | Label | Format | Catalog |
|---|---|---|---|---|
| United States | June 30, 1998 | Revelation Records | CD | REV:070 |
| United States | June 30, 1998 | Revelation Records | LP | REV:070 |
| United States | July 9, 2015 | Revelation Records | LP (repress) | REV:070 |
| United States | January 22, 2019 | Revelation Records | LP (repress) | REV:070 |
