= Eulogy Recordings =

American record label

- Parent company: Stay Sick Recordings
- Founded: 1997
- Founder: John Wylie
- Distributors: Good Life; Alveran; RED
- Genre: hardcore; metalcore; post-hardcore; emo; indie rock
- Country of origin: United States
- Location: Atlanta, Georgia
- Official website: www.eulogyrecordings.com

Eulogy Recordings is an American independent record label established in early 1997 by hardcore guitarist John Wylie. The record company was founded in Cooper City, Florida but its headquarters moved around in various parts of Broward County, Florida. Since its buy-out in 2018, it has been based in Atlanta, Georgia.

The label releases heavy metal and hardcore bands, some of which are straight edge. Among the label's better-known signings were Set Your Goals and New Found Glory.

Eulogy has had exclusive distribution deals with both Good Life Recordings and Alveran Records for European distribution.

== Roster ==
Active

- Age of Ruin
- Brick By Brick
- Catalepsy
- Hoods
- Kid Gorgeous
- Know the Score
- Nevea Tears
- Wisdom in Chains

Former

- REVENGE WMHC
- 200 North
- Arma Angelus
- Barricade
- Bird of Ill Omen
- Bury Your Dead
- Calico System
- Casey Jones
- Culture
- Dashboard Confessional
- The Drama Summer
- Evergreen Terrace
- Fallen From The Sky
- Glasseater
- Kids Like Us
- I Killed The Prom Queen
- Keepsake
- Morning Again
- New Found Glory
- On Bodies
- On Broken Wings
- One Nation Under
- Paddock Park
- Rosaline
- Scatter Shot
- Set Your Goals
- This Day Forward
- Twelve Tribes
- Unearth
- Unsung Zeros
- Walls of Jericho
- The Warriors
- Where Fear and Weapons Meet
- Through the Fire
- Years Spent Cold
