= Nevea Tears =

American metal band

- Origin: Glendora, California, U.S.
- Genres: Metalcore, Emotional post-hardcore
- Years active: 2002–2008
- Label: Eulogy
- Members: Gregory Gillis; Jeff Metajan; Alex Reyes; Matt Marquez
- Past members: John Morello; Brent Doan; Dom Gomez; Aaron Wymore; Amber Barnard; Stephen

Nevea Tears was an American metal and post-hardcore band from Southern California known for their extensive use of electronics in their songs.

== History ==
Nevea Tears formed in 2002 with Greg Gillis and Brent Doan on guitars, Jeff Metajan on keyboards/electronics, Amber Barnard on drums, Dom Gomez on bass and John Morello on vocals. They recorded a demo and sent it to many labels. They were signed by Eulogy Recordings and released their first full length Do I Have to Tell You I Love You? the next year. The band grew to tour with many popular bands of the current hardcore scene for the next three years. Brent and Amber left, leading Jeff to move to guitar and Stephen Crosmer to come in on drums. Shortly before Morello, Gomez and Stephen quit the band, in 2007, Run with the Hunted was released, and in order to go on tour to support their album, the remaining members recruited Aaron Wymore on bass, Matt Marquez on drums, and Alex Reyes on vocals. They went on playing shows for a few months, but lacking loyal members they eventually stopped playing and have been on hiatus since.

== Discography ==
- Demo (2003)
- Do I Have to Tell You Why I Love You? (Eulogy Recordings, 2004)
- Run with the Hunted (Eulogy, 2007)
