= Unsung Zeros =

Pop-punk from Orlando Florida

- Origin: Orlando, Florida
- Genres: Punk rock, power pop
- Years active: 1998 – 2004, 2007, 2014,
- Labels: Eulogy Recordings, Therapy Records
- Members: Josh Bonner, Jerry Phillips, Zach Gehring, Jason Burrows

Unsung Zeros was a rock band that formed in 1998 in Orlando, Florida United States. They also stayed briefly in Eau Claire, Wisconsin where they released a single called "Louder than words".

== Biography ==
Formed in 1998, Unsung Zeros had a loyal following thanks to extensive touring, even attracting many fans outside their home state. Their original lineup was Josh Bonner on vocals and bass, Jerry Phillips on guitar, Zach Gehring also on guitar (who currently plays with the band Mae) and Jason Burrows on the drums.

Their first, self-titled demo was released seven months after the band formed. In 2000 they released their first album, People Mover, on Therapy Records. After months of touring, the band signed with Eulogy Recordings where they released the Fading Out EP in 2002, and later their second album, also on Eulogy, titled Moments From Mourning, in 2002. They also toured with the Warped Tour in 2002, and are featured on the compilation record.

Months after their last release, the band posted on their web site that a new EP was in the works. However, in 2004 the band announced it would be breaking up, never officially releasing the forthcoming EP. The band played one final show in their hometown to a sold-out crowd. The EP was to be titled Life On Repeat, and contained five tracks that were released to the public on their website before the band dissolved.

The band reunited on May 26, 2007, to play a show in Downtown Orlando.

The band reunited on April 15, 2018, to play a show @ Will's Pub Orlando.

== Band members ==
- Josh Bonner – Bass & Vocals
- Jerry Phillips – Guitar & Background Vocals
- Zach Gehring – Guitar
- Jason Burrows – Drums

== Additional members ==
- Omar Surillo – Guitar & Keyboards
- Nathan Chase – Drums
- Chris Martin – Guitar / Vocals
- David Kycia - Guitar / Vocals

Previous lineup:

- Zach Gehring – Guitar
- Eric Porak – Drums
- Kevin Johnson – Bass

== Discography ==
Date of Release	Title	Label
August 4, 2000	People Mover	Therapy Records
January 22, 2002	Fading Out (EP)	Eulogy Recordings
June 25, 2002	Moments From Mourning	Eulogy Recordings
February, 2004	Life on Repeat (EP)	Independent
