= Internal Revolution =

Studio album by Diecast
- Released: September 19, 2006
- Studio: Dungeon Recording Studios, North Miami, Florida
- Genre: Metalcore
- Length: 41:29
- Label: Century Media Records
- Producer: Paul Trust

Diecast chronology
Tearing Down Your Blue Skies (2004)	Internal Revolution (2006)

Internal Revolution is the fourth and final studio album by Massachusetts metalcore band Diecast. It is the only album to feature drummer player Dennis Pavla and bassist Brad Horion. The album was released on September 19, 2006, via Century Media Records.

Music videos were made for the songs "Fade Away" and "Nothing I Could Say." They went on tour in support of the album alongside Sevendust in early 2007.

== Critical reception ==
Professional ratings
Review scores
Source	Rating
AllMusic	3/5 stars
Blabbermouth.net	7/10
Ultimate Guitar	9.7/10
Ox-Fanzine	Mildly positive
Lollipop Magazine	Positive

Eduardo Rivadavia of AllMusic wrote "Diecast finally realize what wonders can be accomplished with less technical fireworks and a simply great chorus -- potentially seeing the light that will lead them forward. But, where Internal Revolution is concerned, that path remains at least partly covered in shadow, with flashes of brilliance piercing through." Blabbermouth.net added "the straight truth is that "Internal Revolution" is a good record – it's just so entrenched in the metalcore formula as to seem like a training manual for up-and-coming bands circa 2003 to follow." A reviewer from Ultimate Guitar wrote "this album is not as heavy and hard as the last album, but it entailed a more progressive feel with more harmonics, riviting bassline complemented with a great voice and captivating lyrics." As for the lyrics he added " The lyrical content of majority of the songs were words I could relate to." Finally German reviewers Ox-Fanzine claimed "The arrangements are no longer structured towards the next mosh part, much more you always have it on the next pop melody to bring out the newly discovered delicate voice of the singer to the fore."

== Track listing ==
No.	Title	Length
1.	"Internal Revolution"	3:20
2.	"Never Forget"	3:14
3.	"Hourglass"	3:53
4.	"Fractured"	5:52
5.	"Weakness"	6:01
6.	"Fade Away"	4:04
7.	"Out of Reach"	4:22
8.	"S.O.S"	3:59
9.	"Nothing I Could Say"	4:00
10.	"Definition of a Hero"	3:19
11.	"The Coldest Rain"	4:54

== Personal ==
Credits adapted from the album's liner notes and Tidal.

Diecast

- Paul Stooddard — vocals
- Brad Horion — bass
- Dennis Pavia — drums
- Kirk Kolaitis — guitar

Production

- Paul Trust — producer, mixing, engineer
- Joe Syring — engineer
- Emily Laszar — mastering
- Sarah Register — mastering
- Joe Williams — mixing

== Charts ==
Chart (2006)	Peak position
US Heatseekers chart	7
