= Diecast (band) =

American metalcore band

- Origin: Boston, Massachusetts, U.S.
- Genres: Metalcore; hard rock
- Years active: 1997–present
- Labels: Samson; Now or Never; Century Media
- Members: Jonathan Kita; Eddie Barton; Dennis Pavia
- Past members: Colin Schleifer; Paul Stoddard; Nassim Rizvi; Mehdy Rad; Dave McGuire; Jason Costa; Jeremy Wooden; Brad Horion; Kirk Kolaitis; Tyler Stroetzel; Richard Thurston
- Website: www.facebook.com/Diecastofficial

Diecast is an American metalcore band originating from Boston, Massachusetts, formed in 1997. They play a style of metalcore with a "blend of melody and heavy rock."

== History ==
Formed in Boston in 1997, Diecast was originally established as a four-piece group featuring vocalist Colin Schleifer, guitarist Nassim Rizvi, bassist Jeremy Wooden, and drummer Jason Costa.

The band's first release Perpetual War was recorded by Brian McTiernan (of Salad Days fame) and released independently in 1997. The demo was recorded to cassette and is now a collector's item.

In 1998, the band released their debut LP Undo the Wicked via Samson Records. The album marked the first recording of the band as a five-piece line-up with the addition of guitarist Dave McGuire who was replaced just after the Samson Records release with guitarist Mehdy Rad who had been involved with a pre-Diecast version of the band.

After the departure of guitarist and founding member Nassim Rizvi, his position was temporarily filled by a number of friends of the band including Buz McGrath and Ken Susi of the band Unearth. Jonathan Kita would be named the permanent replacement on lead guitar in February 1999.

The band recorded a self-funded and self-distributed CD sampler with Dean Bartolonis which included early versions of songs "Solace" and "Disrepair" with Colin Schleifer, Jeremy Wooden, Jason Costa, Mehdy Rad, and Jon Kita. The band toured the east coast of the US and Canada non-stop for the next year.

Amid the buzz surrounding Undo the Wicked, the band signed with New Jersey–based record label Now or Never Records. Diecast recorded their second full-length album, Day of Reckoning with producer Paul Trust in Florida during the summer of 2000, then embarked on a tour with Stretch Arm Strong, One King Down and Shai Hulud. Guitarist Mehdy Rad left shortly before tour and was replaced by Jonathan Kita; halfway through the tour, second guitarist Jimmy Bonasoro left and was replaced by Richard Thurston (formerly of Timescape Zero, Culture, and Blood Has Been Shed). Day of Reckoning was eventually released on February 13, 2001, and the band recruited guitarist Kirk Kolaitis from Brockton-based band Punch the Klown. The band embarked on a number of tours across the United States, supporting such bands as All Out War, Dying Fetus, Napalm Death - as well as opening for world-renowned acts Alice Cooper and The Cult.

In the spring of 2002, Diecast secured the opening slot for the Slayer "God Hates Us All" tour. Upon completion of the tour, the band decided to focus their attention towards a new album. Faced with record label issues, and dissension internally about the musical direction they should take, the recording phase for their third full-length album was halted. At this point founding member and vocalist Colin Schleifer left the group in May 2003 to pursue other interests, and was replaced by vocalist Paul Stoddard.

Diecast inked a new record deal with recognized independent metal label, Century Media Records in 2004 and went into the studio again with producer Paul Trust. The band then released their third full-length album Tearing Down Your Blue Skies on October 19, 2004. An excerpt of the track "Rise and Oppose" was licensed by Volkswagen Automotive and used in an advertisement for the Volkswagen Jetta. The album was re-released by Century Media in 2006 with a foreword written by Colin Schleifer, and three bonus tracks including a cover of Raining Blood by Slayer. The three tracks were produced by Zeuss (Shadows Fall, Hatebreed), and were added to the re-release along with extras.

Founding member and drummer Jason Costa departed the band during their early 2006 tour. Dennis Pavia formerly of Tantrumn volunteered to fill in and then eventually became a full-time member.

On May 16, 2006, vocalist Paul Stoddard announced that in addition to Jason Costa no longer being part of the band, bassist Jeremy Wooden, the only original remaining member, had decided to depart as well. Brad Horion was named as his replacement.

The band's fourth full-length album Internal Revolution was released on September 19, 2006, and features the single "Fade Away." It was again recorded in Miami and produced by Trust. A companion video was directed by David Brodsky. The album shifted 1,246 copies in its first week according to Nielsen SoundScan. They released a new song on their MySpace page entitled "Disconnect" as well as a second song, "Sanctified" on a sponsor's MySpace page. In November 2008 the band released a press statement announcing they had parted ways with label Century Media. In addition the band shopped a 4 song demo to other labels with hopes to release a new album which never materialized. In addition to shopping new labels in late 2008, bassist Eddie Barton joined the band as a full-time replacement for Brad Horion.

In August 2012, the band began recording its fifth studio album. In December 2013, it was announced that recording of the album was on hold due to financial issues. In February 2014, it was announced that recording of the album would continue, and that it would be released in the spring or summer. In April 2014, it was announced that the album release was pushed back to 2015. In January 2016, the band stated they would continue recording the album at Conclave Studios in New York. In March 2021, the band revealed they were in contact for the first time since 2017 and alluded to be still working on their long-awaited album. Guitarist Tyler Stroetzel was absent from the announcement, implying he is no longer in the band.

On October 24, 2022, vocalist Paul Stoddard died. His cause of death was revealed as pulmonary hypertension.

== Band members ==
=== Current members ===
- Jonathan Kita – lead guitar (1999–present)
- Dennis Pavia – drums (2006–present)
- Eddie Barton – bass (2008–present)

=== Former members ===
- Jeremy Wooden – bass (1997–2006)
- Jason Costa – drums (1997–2006)
- Colin Schleifer – vocals (1997–2003)
- Nassim Rizvi – lead guitar (1997)
- Mehdy Rad – lead guitar (1997–1998)
- Dave McGuire – rhythm guitar (1998–1999)
- Jimmy Bonasoro – rhythm guitar (1999–2000)
- Richard Thurston – rhythm guitar (2000)
- Kirk Kolaitis – rhythm guitar (2000–2011)
- Paul Stoddard – vocals (2003–2022) (died 2022)
- Brad Horion – bass (2006–2008)
- Tyler Stroetzel – rhythm guitar (2013–2021)

=== Live members ===
- Buz McGrath – guitar (1998)
- Brian Silvia – bass (2006)
- Rob Laurion – bass (2007)
- Rob Spampinato – guitar (2011)

== Discography ==
=== Studio albums ===
- Undo the Wicked (1998)
- Day of Reckoning (2001)
- Tearing Down Your Blue Skies (2004)
- Internal Revolution (2006)

=== Demos ===
- Perpetual War (1997)
- Sampler (1999)

== Videography ==
| Year | Song | Director |
|---|---|---|
| 2003 | "Singled Out" | Marc Mirnbach |
| 2004 | "Medieval" | Dale Resteghini |
| 2005 | "Rise & Oppose" | Kevin Leonard |
| 2005 | "These Days" | David Brodsky |
| 2006 | "Fade Away" | David Brodsky |
| 2007 | "Nothing I Could Say" | Ian McFarland |
