= Richard Thurston =

American musician

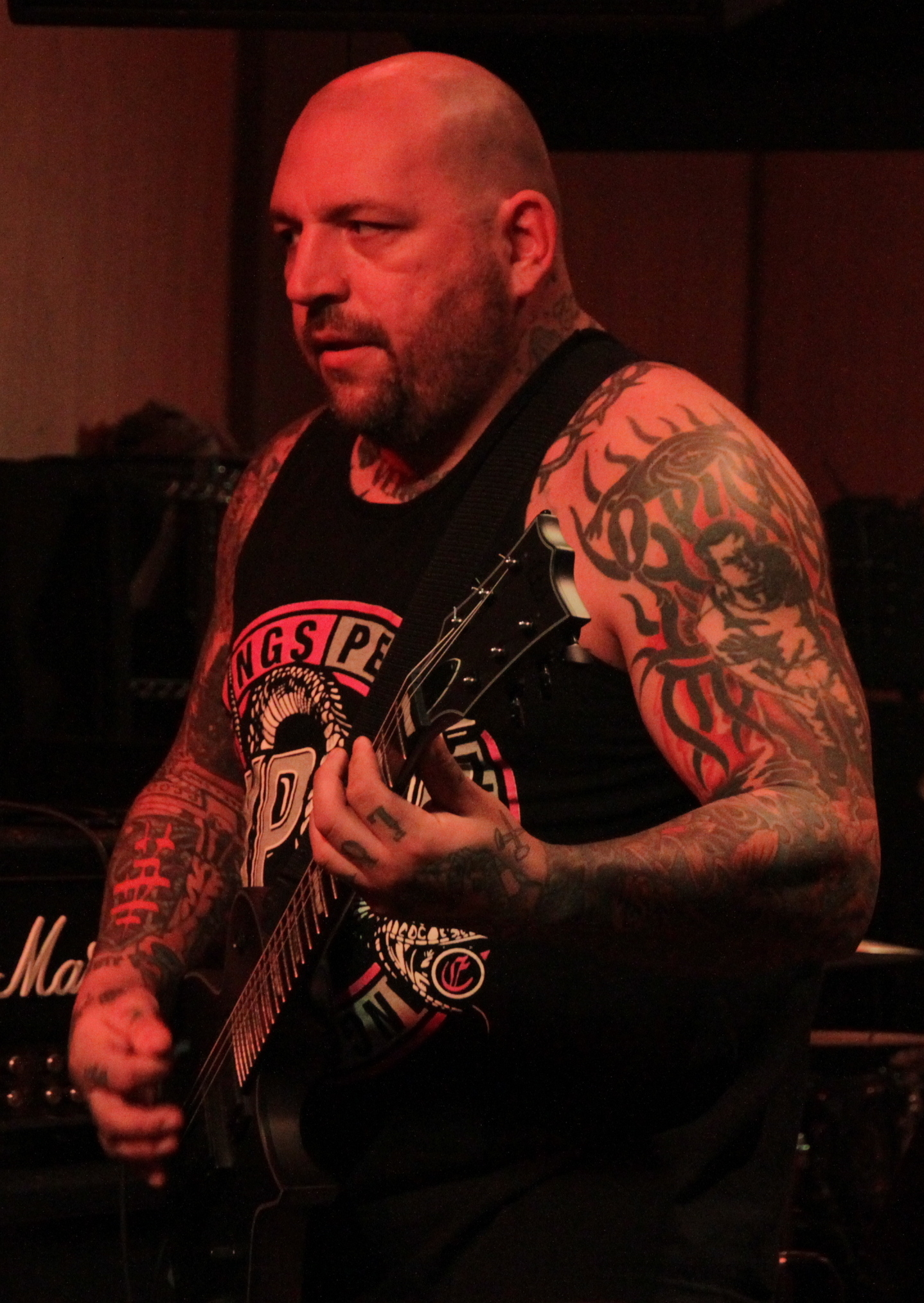
- Thurston performing with On Bodies in Japan in 2015

Background information
- Also known as: Rich Thurston
- Born: January 6, 1973 (age 53); Boston, Massachusetts, U.S.
- Origin: West Palm Beach, Florida, U.S.
- Genres: Metalcore; hardcore punk
- Occupation: Musician
- Instruments: Guitar; bass guitar; drums; vocals
- Years active: 1991–present
- Member of: Deep Breath; No Grave; Lowest
- Formerly of: Against; Anthem; As Friends Rust; Blood Has Been Shed; Broken Glass Everywhere; Culture; Diecast; Elijah's Message; Ego-Trip; Greater Vision; Grip; Justified Defiance; On Bodies; One Nation Under; Prayers Unanswered; Saboteur; Severance; Still Crossed; Terror; Timescape Zero; Treason; Until the End; Walls of Jericho

Richard Thurston (born January 6, 1973) is an American musician. He notably performed in such hardcore and metalcore bands as Timescape Zero, Culture, Blood Has Been Shed, Until the End, Diecast, Terror, Walls of Jericho, On Bodies and As Friends Rust. He is a multi-instrumentalist musician and vocalist, having performed guitar, bass and drums in addition to vocals in several of his bands.

Thurston has lived in and performed with bands from Florida, Virginia, Connecticut, Massachusetts, California, Michigan and Ohio, the latter of which has been his home since 1997. He has also been straight-edge and vegan since 1994, participating in several bands that vocalized those beliefs and ethics.

== Personal life ==
Thurston was born in Boston, Massachusetts, but moved to Florida in his late teens.

Thurston began training as a mixed martial artist in 2003. During his inaugural amateur fight on November 5, 2004, he dislocated his elbow while against opponent Joshua Blanchard. In November 2006, Thurston became a professional fighter.

== Bands ==
- Ego Trip – guitar (1991–1992)
- Severance – drums (1992)
- Timescape Zero – guitar (1992–1993)
- Grip – bass (1993)
- Culture – guitar (1993–1997, 1997, 2012–2016, 2025), bass guitar (1993–1994), lead vocals (1994), drums (1995, 2015)
- Elijah's Message – guitar (1998)
- Prayers Unanswered – guitar (1998–1999)
- Blood Has Been Shed – bass guitar (1999–2000), guitar (2000)
- Until the End – guest vocals (2000)
- Diecast – guitar (2000)
- Broken Glass Everywhere – guitar (2000–2001)
- One Nation Under – guitar (2001–2002)
- Terror – bass guitar (2002–2003)
- Against – guitar (2003)
- Still Crossed – guitar (2003)
- Walls of Jericho – touring bass guitar (2003)
- Anthem – guitar (2005)
- On Bodies – guitar, bass guitar, drums (2009–2017)
- Justified Defiance – vocals (2015–2016)
- Treason – guitar, drums (2017–2022)
- Deep Breath – vocals, guitar, bass guitar, drums (2020–present)
- Lowest – guitar, bass guitar, drums (2020–present)
- Saboteur – drums (2021–2022)
- As Friends Rust – drums (2022)
- Greater Vision – guitar (2022–2023)
- No Grave – guitar (2023–present)
- Wounded Paw – guitar (2024–present)
