= Damien Moyal =

American musician (born 1976)

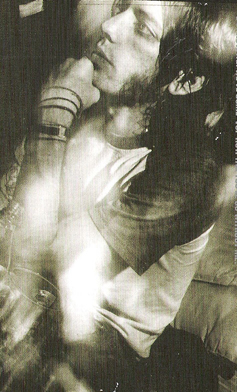
- Moyal during an As Friends Rust photo shoot promoting the album Won in mid-2001.

Background information
- Also known as: Damien Decline; DJ Done; Sev Burner
- Born: Damien Zev Moyal; September 25, 1976 (age 49); Amstelveen, Netherlands
- Origin: Miami, Florida
- Genres: Death metal; gothic rock; groove metal; hardcore punk; melodic hardcore; metallic hardcore; post-hardcore; post-punk; sludge metal
- Occupations: Singer; musician; lyricist; songwriter; designer
- Instruments: Vocals; guitar
- Years active: 1992–present
- Labels: Asian Man; Defiance; Doghouse; Equal Vision; Eulogy; Initial; Good Life; Metal Blade; Revelation; Sub City; Toybox; Trial & Error; Uprising
- Member of: As Friends Rust; Caskette; Damien Done; Ekstasis
- Formerly of: Best Wishes; Bird of Ill Omen; Bridgeburne R; Culture; Evergreen; Fork in the Road; Goodnight at the End of the Tunnel; HandOverFist; Insist; Morning Again; Old Man Underground; On Bodies; Pierre Supply; Reach; Rubbers; Shai Hulud; Some Sort of Radio; U.S. Decline

Damien Zev Moyal (born September 25, 1976) is an American vocalist, lyricist, musician, songwriter, and designer. Born in Amstelveen, North Holland, Netherlands, he moved to the United States as a child and grew up in Miami, Florida, where he notably fronted such hardcore punk, metallic hardcore, and melodic hardcore bands as Shai Hulud, As Friends Rust, Morning Again, Culture, Bird of Ill Omen, and Bridgeburne R. Moyal has been based in Ann Arbor, Michigan since 2006, and is the founding member of the semi-eponymously named gothic rock/post-punk band Damien Done.

Moyal's early musical projects include the hardcore punk act U.S. Decline (1992–1993), the hardcore group Insist (1993), the metallic hardcore band Reach (1993–1994), and the groove metal project HandOverFist (1994). He next joined established vegan straight edge metallic hardcore band Culture, which he fronted from 1994 to 1995, then again from 1996 to 1998, recording music for such record labels as Uprising Records, Good Life Recordings, Toybox Records, and Conquer the World Records. Moyal later took part of Culture's reunion from 2012 to 2016, which saw material released through Eulogy Recordings. Following his first exit from Culture in 1995, he co-founded the melodic metallic hardcore band Shai Hulud (1995–1996), participating in its demo recording and helping the band get signed to Revelation Records. Moyal's vocal and lyrical contributions to Shai Hulud were released by such record labels as Revelation Records, Crisis Records, Asian Man Records, Sub City Records, Trial & Error Records, and Metal Blade Records.

While still in Shai Hulud, Moyal teamed up with ex-Culture members to launch the metallic hardcore band Morning Again (1995–1996). The band recorded material for Conquer the World Records and Good Life Recordings, which again lead to getting signed by Revelation Records. Moyal has since performed with Morning Again at a handful of reunion shows in 1999, 2002, and 2014. After quitting Shai Hulud and being fired from Morning Again, Moyal started the sludge-metallic hardcore band Bird of Ill Omen (1996–1997), but left before any studio material could be tracked. Moyal's lyrics were later used by Bird of Ill Omen's second vocalist for material released by Eulogy Recordings. While still in Bird of Ill Omen, Moyal joined the melodic hardcore side-project As Friends Rust (1996–1997), which broke up after recording a demo tape.

In 1997, Moyal relocated to Gainesville, Florida, where Culture had moved the year prior, and there reformed As Friends Rust (1997–2002), which quickly became his principal project for the next five years, releasing music through such labels as Good Life Recordings, Doghouse Records, Initial Records, Defiance Records, and Equal Vision Records. Moyal again reformed As Friends Rust in 2008, and the band has remained active into the 2020s. When Culture broke up in 1998, Moyal and several of its members teamed up with members of Assück to form the short-lived metal band Some Sort of Radio (1998–1999), and in 1999, he and members of As Friends Rust and Speak 714 formed the old-school hardcore punk side-project Bridgeburne R (1999–2000). Following his departure from As Friends Rust in 2002, Moyal founded the semi-eponymously named gothic rock/post-punk solo project Damien Done, which eventually expanded into a full band. After returning to Miami in 2004, he took part of the acoustic folk duo Goodnight at the End of the Tunnel with Kaleb Stewart (2005), and the short-lived metallic hardcore band Best Wishes (2006). In 2006, he moved to Ann Arbor, Michigan and formed the DJ duo Old Man Underground (2008). Moyal reunited with ex-Culture members in the hardcore band On Bodies (2009–2017), which released music through Eulogy Recordings and Demons Run Amok Entertainment. Since 2022, Moyal has been part of the death metal band Ekstasis with drummer Fred Estby, and the heavy metal band Caskette.

== Background ==
=== Early bands: U.S. Decline, Insist, Reach, and HandOverFist (1992–1994) ===
Moyal's first band was named U.S. Decline, a hardcore punk group based in Miami, Florida, which he joined in 1992, at the invitation of his friend, drummer Steve Blanchard. Most of the band's members had previously played under the name Midget Stew, but with a different vocalist. When Moyal came into the picture, the new line-up named itself U.S. Decline, and also included guitarists Sal Lopez and Francis Alvarez, and bass guitarist Sky Rheam, with whom the vocalist would continue to play in his next two bands. Although the band recorded rehearsal demos with Moyal, U.S. Decline would not perform any shows, nor enter a studio to record a proper demo tape (The Empty Fight for Freedom), until mid-1993, by which time Scott Pellicane had been recruited as lead vocalist.

In 1993, Moyal and Rheam formed a heavier Miami hardcore band named Insist. The band also included future Makeshift and Sunday Driver vocalist and guitarist Alex Martinez, guitarist Manny Avila, and drummer Doron Lev. Insist played its first and only show on September 11, 1993, sharing the stage with U.S. Decline (with Pellicane on vocals), Sloth and The Staggers. The band also recorded a rehearsal demo tape which was not circulated.

In October 1993, Moyal, Rheam and Avila left Insist to form a new metallic hardcore band named Reach. Reach also included drummer Louie Long (who would later play in Culture and Morning Again) and co-lead vocalist Joel Pelkey, both of whom had played in another metallic hardcore band, Organized Pain, with guitarist John Wylie (who also later played in Culture and Morning Again). Reach played its first and only show on November 27, 1993, again sharing the stage with Sloth and The Staggers, and with Tension (the latter of which featured guitarist Wylie and bass guitarist Matt Fox, with whom Moyal would later play in Shai Hulud). In the summer of 1994, Moyal briefly sang in the groove metal project HandOverFist, which featured former Trauma members, guitarist John Paul Guy and drummer Alex Garbutt.

=== Culture (1994–1995, 1996–1998, 2012–2016, 2025) ===
Moyal joined established Pompano Beach, Florida-based metallic hardcore band Culture in September 1994. The band was formed by ex-Timescape Zero and Ego Trip guitarist Richard Thurston, along with drummer Joshua Williams and original vocalist Mark Mitchell in December 1993 and had already gone through several member changes, including three prior vocalists, and then included ex-Tension and Organized Pain guitarist John Wylie. Culture had also previously recorded and released a demo tape and a 7-inch vinyl single earlier in 1994, and the band was getting ready to enter Studio 13 in Deerfield Beach, Florida with producer Jeremy Staska to track a full-length.

With Moyal newly on board, Culture embraced a vegan and straight edge identity and recorded its debut album Born of You with Staska. Unsatisfied with the first-recorded version, Culture wrote a handful of new songs and returned to re-record the full-length two more times within two months with Staska. Moyal was going through a difficult break-up at the time and implemented many of the depressive themes he was facing in the lyrics of the new songs.

The third version of the album was sent to Redford, Michigan-based hardcore record label Conquer the World Records, which quickly signed the band and released the album on compact disc and 12-inch vinyl in June 1995. Culture returned to the same studio in the spring of 1995 to record four new songs, intended for a series of Various Artists compilations and a split 7-inch vinyl with emo band Roosevelt for Vero Beach, Florida-based record label Intention Records. One of the songs from this recording session was used on the Laguna Beach, California-based record label Uprising Records' Various Artists compilation Ceremony of Fire.

By the time that Culture's Born of You album was released, however, tensions with guitarist Wylie had forced Moyal out of the band. The band toured in promotion of Born of You during the summer of 1995 with vocalist Louie Long, and afterwards re-recruited its original vocalist Mark Mitchell. Born of You became successful, and was reissued a number of times by such record labels as Good Life Recordings, Demons Run Amok Entertainment and Contraband Goods. Following a poorly-received tour in the summer of 1996, promoting the band's Deforestation EP (which featured lyrics written by Moyal prior to his departure), Culture relocated to Gainesville, Florida and asked Moyal to return as the band's vocalist.

With Moyal back in the band, Culture was immediately signed to Belgium's Good Life Recordings and Chicago, Illinois' Toybox Records. The band promptly entered Goldentone Studio in December 1996 to re-record two old songs with producer Rob McGregor, planned for a 7-inch EP (they were later included as bonus tracks on their Heteronome EP). During the winter of 1997, Culture did a series of mini-tours on the east coast and midwest of the United States. In February 1997, Culture recorded three new songs at Goldentone for a split with Belgian metallic hardcore band Kindred. In May 1997, Culture returned to the same studio again to record three new songs for the Heteronome EP.

Culture toured the United States during June 1997, playing such festivals as the Syracuse Hardcore Festival, in Syracuse, New York and the Indianapolis Hardcore Festival in Indianapolis, Indiana. Culture then embarked on a three-week tour of Europe, including a show at Ieperfest in Ypres, Belgium, accompanied by Kindred in support of their split release and Heteronome EP on Good Life Recordings. Upon returning home, Culture's line-up changed, resulting with the departure of original guitarist Thurston and drummer Jason Dooley. The band recruited former Morning Again bass guitarist Christopher "Floyd" Beckham and Roosevelt drummer Timothy Kirkpatrick. With the new line-up, Culture returned to Goldentone to record seven songs with McGregor; five re-recorded from Born of You, one new song and a cover of Judge's "Fed Up", intended for a release titled Reborn of You, or Mike Warden Can Suck It (a pun on Judge's Chung King Can Suck It). The release was stuck in limbo at Toybox Records and was never properly released.

In November and December 1997, Culture was booked for a month-long tour of Europe with American punk rock band Gang Green, but were kicked off when the latter objected to playing shows with a straight-edge band. Culture instead performed at the Chicago Hardcore Festival in Chicago, Illinois and Gainesvillefest in Gainesville, Florida in December 1997. Culture was booked for a two-month North American tour with New York hardcore band Shutdown during April and May 1998, but their van broke down on their way to the first show and they had to pull out. Culture returned to Europe for a four-week tour in August and September 1998, which included another stop to play the Ieperfest in Ypres, Belgium, but broke up shortly afterwards.

Culture has since regrouped for a series of reunions, beginning in September 2012, followed by August–September 2013, July 2014, June–July 2015, July 2016, and April 2025. In September 2012, a compilation of previously unreleased material and demos, titled From the Vaults: Demos and Outtakes 1993–1998, was released by Eulogy Recordings on compact disc and Ghetto Josh Records and New Ethic Record Co-Op on 12-inch vinyl. Twelve of the nineteen songs on the compilation feature Moyal on vocals. In March 2015, the band recorded a new EP for United Kingdom-based record label Carry the Weight Records.

=== Shai Hulud (1995–1996) ===
In the late summer of 1995, Moyal joined up with guitarists Matt Fox and Dave Silber and drummer Jason Lederman to form metallic hardcore band Shai Hulud. Lederman was quickly replaced by Steve Kleisath and rhythm guitarist Oliver Chapoy joined when Silber moved to playing bass guitar. With this line-up, Shai Hulud recorded 6 songs with producer Jeremy Staska at Studio 13 in Deerfield Beach, Florida, and shortly after played its first show at a Halloween party on October 31, 1995, at Discount's rehearsal warehouse.

Shai Hulud's demo tape was received by Rob Moran, an A&R representative at Revelation Records' subsidiary Crisis Records (and who also played bass guitar for metallic hardcore band Unbroken). The band was promptly signed in early 1996 and a 7-inch vinyl of the recorded material was planned, but tensions between Moyal and Fox led to Moyal's voluntary departure. At the time of his departure, in the spring of 1996, Moyal recommended fourteen year old Chad Gilbert take his place as the band's new vocalist.

Moyal's original lyrics were used on two of the three songs from Shai Hulud's debut EP, A Profound Hatred of Man, released on February 18, 1997, by Crisis Records, as well as on four of the nine songs from the band's debut LP, Hearts Once Nourished with Hope and Compassion, released on November 4, 1997, by Crisis Records. In August 2001, Sub City Records and Asian Man Records released the song "Sauve Qui Peut" from Shai Hulud's 1995 recording session on their Various Artists compilation Plea for Peace/Take Action.

All of the original 1995 recordings were later included on the band's compilation album, A Comprehensive Retrospective: or How We Learned to Stop Worrying and Release Bad and Useless Recordings, which was first announced in 2000 and planned for release through Fox's record label, Ides of March. After considerable delay, the compilation was ultimately released through Revelation Records and Fox's renamed label, At Dawn We Wage War, on January 25, 2005. In addition to the demo, the release also includes four rehearsal recordings with Moyal on vocals and a phone message left by Moyal on Fox's answering machine. The band's original recording of the song "Hardly", with Moyal on vocals, was also released on a Various Artists compilation by Australian record label Trial & Error Records in 2005.

Moyal has since provided guest vocals on Shai Hulud's song "Medicine to the Dead", which appeared on the band's fourth studio album Reach Beyond the Sun, released on February 15, 2013, by Metal Blade Records.

=== Morning Again (1995–1996, 1999, 2002, 2014) ===
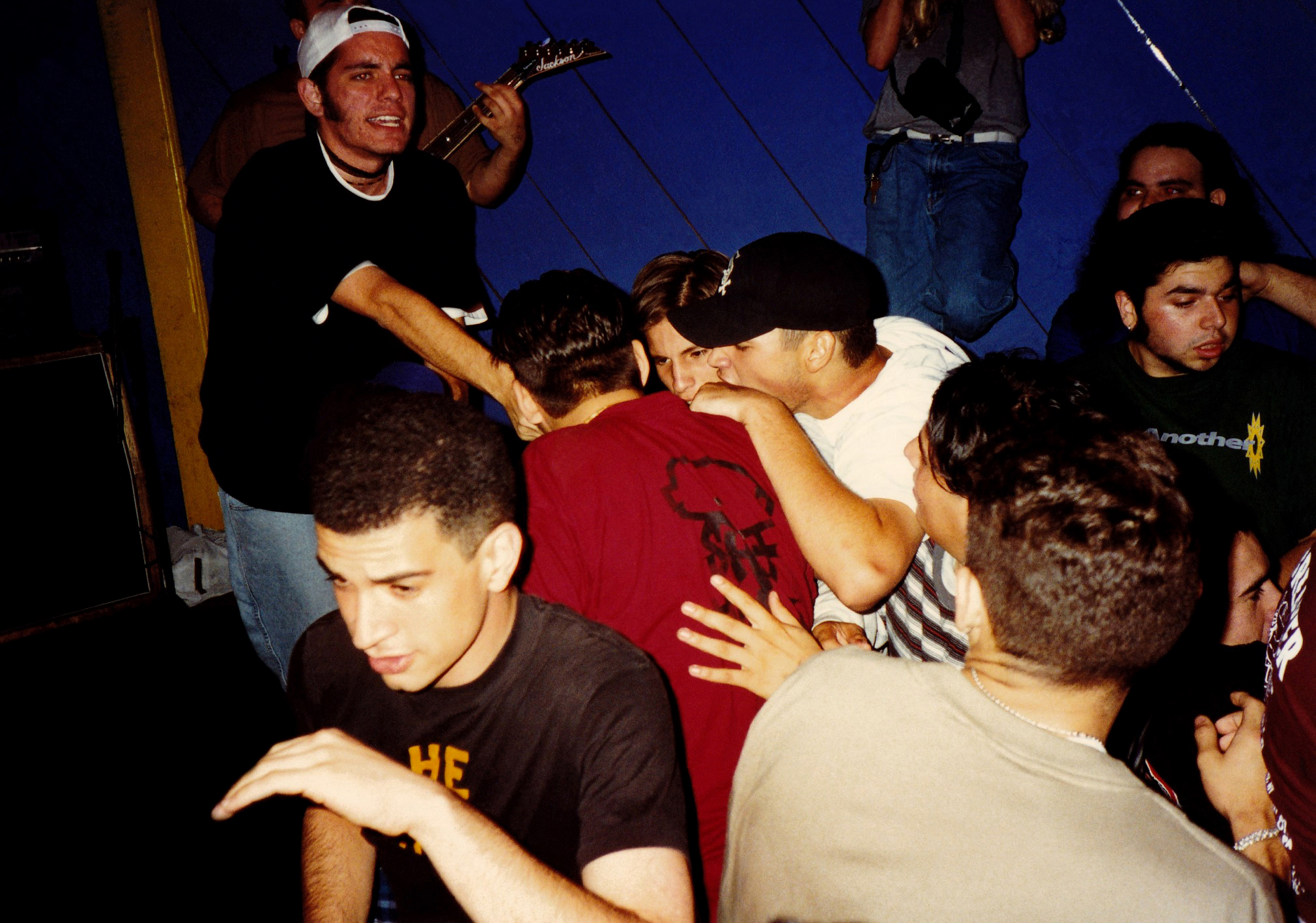
Moyal (top left) performing with Morning Again at Cheers in Coconut Grove, Florida on June 11, 1996.

In December 1995, while Moyal was still a member of Shai Hulud, he was recruited to front a new metallic hardcore band formed by ex-Culture members, guitarist John Wylie and drummer Louie Long. Although Moyal and Wylie had suffered conflicts of interest in Culture six months prior, the two hoped to reconcile, which in turn inspired the lyrics to Morning Again's first song, "Turning Over". Morning Again was completed with guitarist Michael Wolz and bass guitarist Eric Ervin, and the band quickly wrote five songs and entered Studio 13 in January 1996 to record its debut EP, The Cleanest War, with producer Jeremy Staska. Two months later, the band returned to the same studio to record two songs for an eponymous 7-inch vinyl for Intention Records. The 7-inch was released on May 1, 1996, while The Cleanest War was released on compact disc and 12-inch vinyl through Conquer the World Records on May 15, 1996. The band then embarked on a two-week tour in promotion of its first two releases, playing shows up the East Coast and Midwest of the United States and into Canada. Upon returning home, Moyal was kicked out of the band due to recurring conflicts with Wylie.

Morning Again gained international popularity and became the first American band signed to Belgian record label Good Life Recordings in late 1996. Good Life Recordings promptly released the compilation Hand of Hope on compact disc and 12-inch vinyl in January 1997, which included all of the band's recorded material with Moyal on vocals. The same songs were later reissued on the compact disc compilation Hand of the Martyr, co-released by Eulogy Recordings and Alveran Records on April 30, 2002, to coincide with a Morning Again reunion show. Moyal's songs were repackaged again on the 12-inch vinyl compilation I, released by Germany's Demons Run Amok Entertainment on September 25, 2015.

Moyal has sporadically performed reunion shows with Morning Again In December 1999, he joined the band to perform two secret shows under the names Hand of Hope and Cleanest War; the first at Club Q in Davie, Florida, the second at Gainesvillefest in Gainesville, Florida. On June 15, 2002, Morning Again performed another reunion show with Moyal under the name Hand of Hope at the Orlando Magicfest in Orlando, Florida. Moyal last performed with Morning Again at Ieperfest in Ypres, Belgium on August 9, 2014.

In January 2026 it was announced that Moyal would be filling in for Kevin Byers on Morning Again's European tour later that year.

=== Fork in the Road and Bird of Ill Omen (1996–1997) ===
Two months after being dismissed from Morning Again, Moyal formed North Miami, Florida-based sludge metal/metalcore band Fork in the Road, which quickly changed name to Bird of Ill Omen. The band also included guitarists Joseph Simmons (who would later play in Morning Again, Culture and As Friends Rust) and José Martinez (later of Poison the Well), bass guitarist Thomas Rankine (who would later play in As Friends Rust and Further Seems Forever) and drummer George Rios (formerly of doom metal band Floor and meatlcore band Brethren). Martinez, Rankine and Rios had previously played in the emo band Crestfallen earlier that year.

While writing a full-length album's worth of material during most of late 1996 and early 1997, Bird of Ill Omen played local shows with Shai Hulud, Morning Again, Discount, Strongarm, Vision of Disorder, Earth Crisis, Zao and Cavity. By late 1996, Moyal was shuffling his time between North Miami-based Bird of Ill Omen, Davie-based As Friends Rust, and Gainesville-based Culture. Bird of Ill Omen's membership was revised when former Morning Again bass guitarist Peter Bartsocas (who would also later play in As Friends Rust) replaced Martinez in November 1996, and the band recruited second vocalist, Rob Ogman. In March 1997, Simmons was kicked out of Bird of Ill Omen, after he was asked to join Morning Again as their new guitarist. The band quickly recruited Andrew Logan, who had played in Crestfallen. Moyal was displeased about Simmons' firing, as it had been done without his knowledge while he was out of town with Culture, which lead to his quitting the band.

By this time, the band had written half a dozen songs with Moyal for a planned full-length debut. The band's new vocalist, William Shane Post, used Moyal's original lyrics for three of the six songs on Bird of Ill Omen's debut album, Self, Dare You Still Breathe?. The album was released on compact disc in February 1998 by Eulogy Recordings, on 12-inch vinyl in July 1998 by Think Tank Records, and on compact cassette in October 2021 by Contraband Goods. The band also used the band logos which Moyal had designed on most of their releases and merchandise.

=== As Friends Rust (1996–1997, 1997–2002, 2008–present) ===
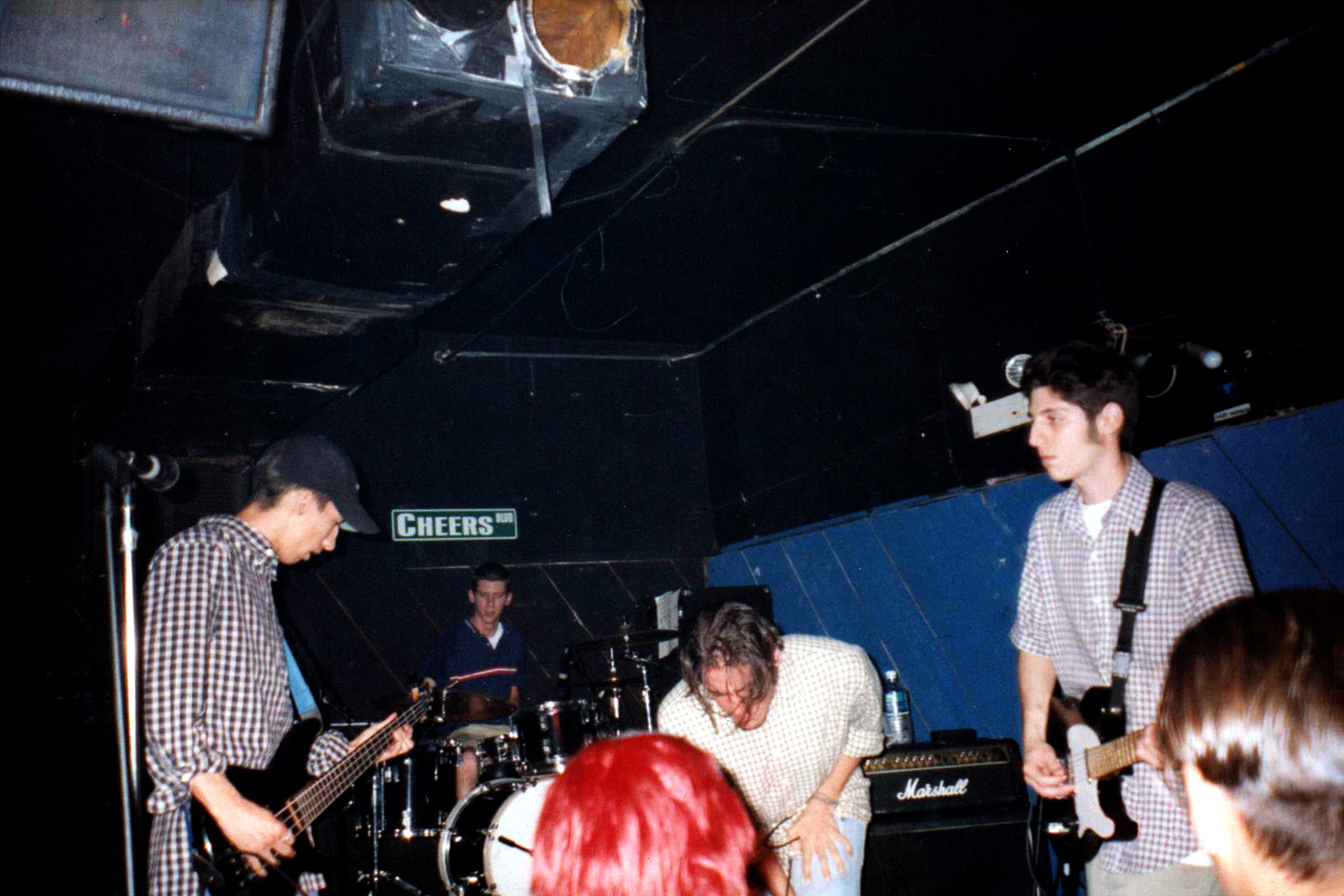
As Friends Rust performing with its original members at Cheers in Coconut Grove, Florida on November 11, 1996. From left to right: Jeronimo Gomez, Matthew Crum, Moyal and Henry Olmino.

In September 1996, while still a member of Bird of Ill Omen and having recently rejoined Culture, Moyal teamed up with guitarist Henry Olmino, bass guitarist Jeronimo Gomez and drummer Matthew Crum to form the Davie, Florida-based melodic hardcore band As Friends Rust. The band was named after lyrics from the song "Now Ruin Is", penned by Moyal in 1995, originally planned as a Shai Hulud song, but ultimately used as a Bird of Ill Omen song. As Friends Rust recorded six songs at Wisner Productions in November 1996 with producer James Paul Wisner, using three of them on a well-circulated demo tape. By the spring of 1997, this incarnation of As Friends Rust had fallen apart as Moyal dedicated more time to Culture and Bird of Ill Omen; Olmino, Gomez and Crum opted to continue playing together in the bands Red Letter Day, and later, The Rocking Horse Winner and The Darling Fire, while Gomez also played with Poison the Well.

Moyal reformed the band after moving to Gainesville, Florida, with then-members of Culture. In March 1998, As Friends Rust recorded the song "Home Is Where the Heart Aches" at Goldentone with producer Rob McGregor; three members of Hot Water Music provided backup vocals on the recording. The new song was combined with four songs from the 1996 recording session to make up the band's debut EP, The Fists of Time, released by Good Life Recordings on compact disc and 10-inch vinyl in July 1998. The cover art of The Fists of Time was designed by Moyal. In promotion of the new line-up, recording and forthcoming release, the band embarked on a five-week tour of the United States in June and July 1998, accompanied by Discount and Dillinger Four. The tour included stops to perform at such festivals as More Than Music in Columbus, Ohio, Tin Can Full of Dreams in Lawrence, Massachusetts and Wilkes-Barre Festival in Wilkes-Barre, Pennsylvania.

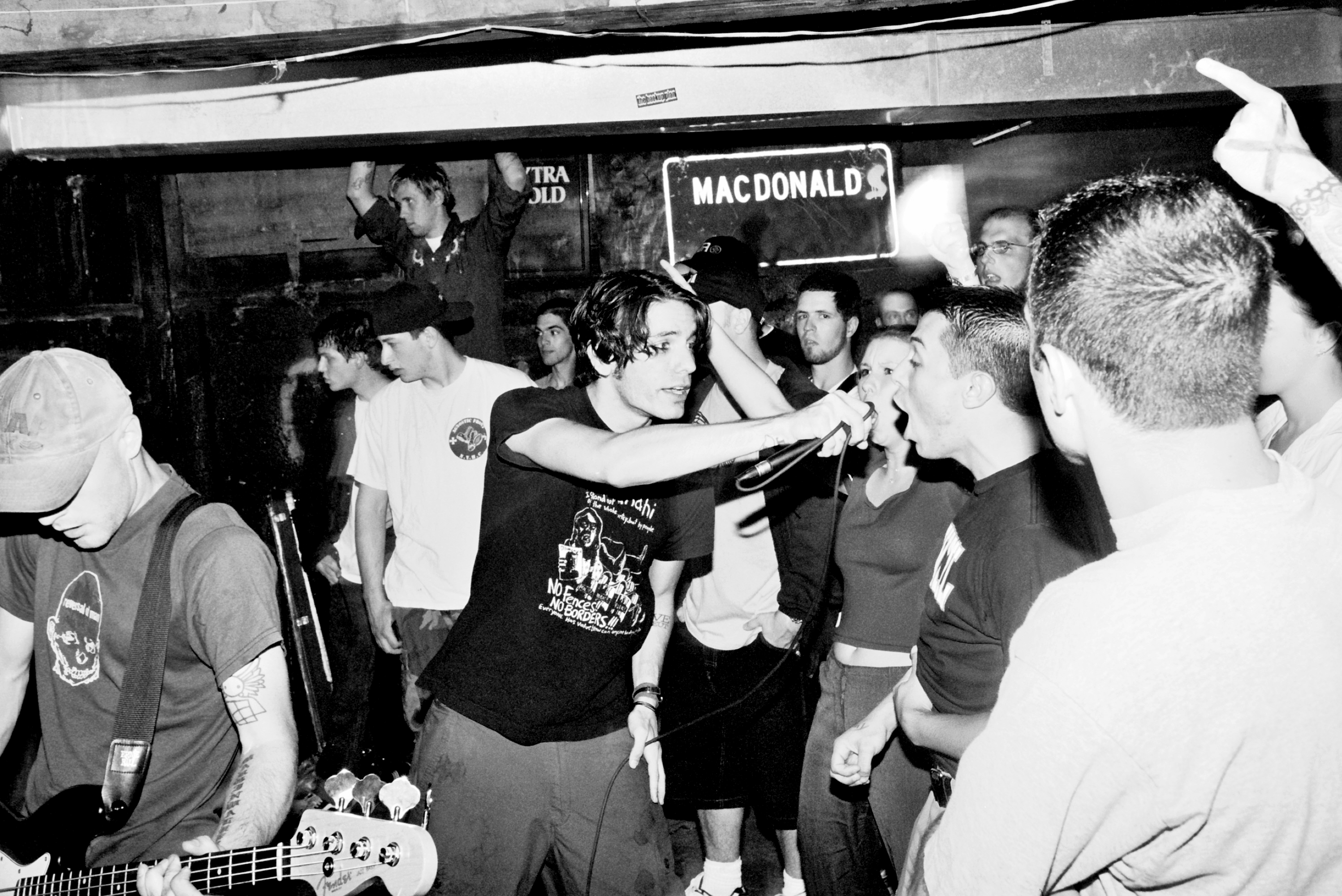
Moyal (center) and Kaleb Stewart (left) performing with As Friends Rust at 33 Tyler Street in Buffalo, New York on June 29, 2000.

After a slight line-up change, As Friends Rust returned to Goldentone to record "The First Song on the Tape You Make Her" with McGregor. The song would appear on a split CD and 7-inch vinyl with Discount, released by Good Life Recordings in December 1998. The two bands toured Europe from December 1998 to January 1999, in promotion of the release and accompanied by Swedish hardcore band Purusam. In the spring of 1999, As Friends Rust was signed to American record label Doghouse Records and a month later returned to Goldentone to record six songs with McGregor. The new material was released on a self-titled compact disc and 8" vinyl by Doghouse Records in September 1999; the European version was erroneously promoted under the title God Hour by Good Life Recordings during the summer of 1999.

As Friends Rust toured the east coast of the United States during three weeks in June 1999 accompanied by acoustic musician Keith Welsh. The tour included stops to play the Wilkes-Barre Summer Music Festival in Kingston, Pennsylvania and Syracuse Hell Fest in Syracuse, New York. The band quickly followed up with a five-week European tour in July and August 1999, playing at such festivals as Good Life Midsummer Hardcore Festival in Kuurne, Belgium, Festival Hardcore in Sant Feliu De Guíxols, Spain and Ieperfest in Ypres, Belgium. The European tour was intended to be shared with Hot Water Music, but due to disagreements, the two bands booked separate tours. In October 1999, Japanese record label Howling Bull Entertainment released the compact disc compilation Eleven Songs, which included a selection of the band's recorded material from 1996, 1988 and 1999. In December 1999, the band played Gainesvillefest in Gainesville, Florida. A December 1999-January 2000 tour with The August Prophecy and Dragbody was booked but cancelled at the last minute.

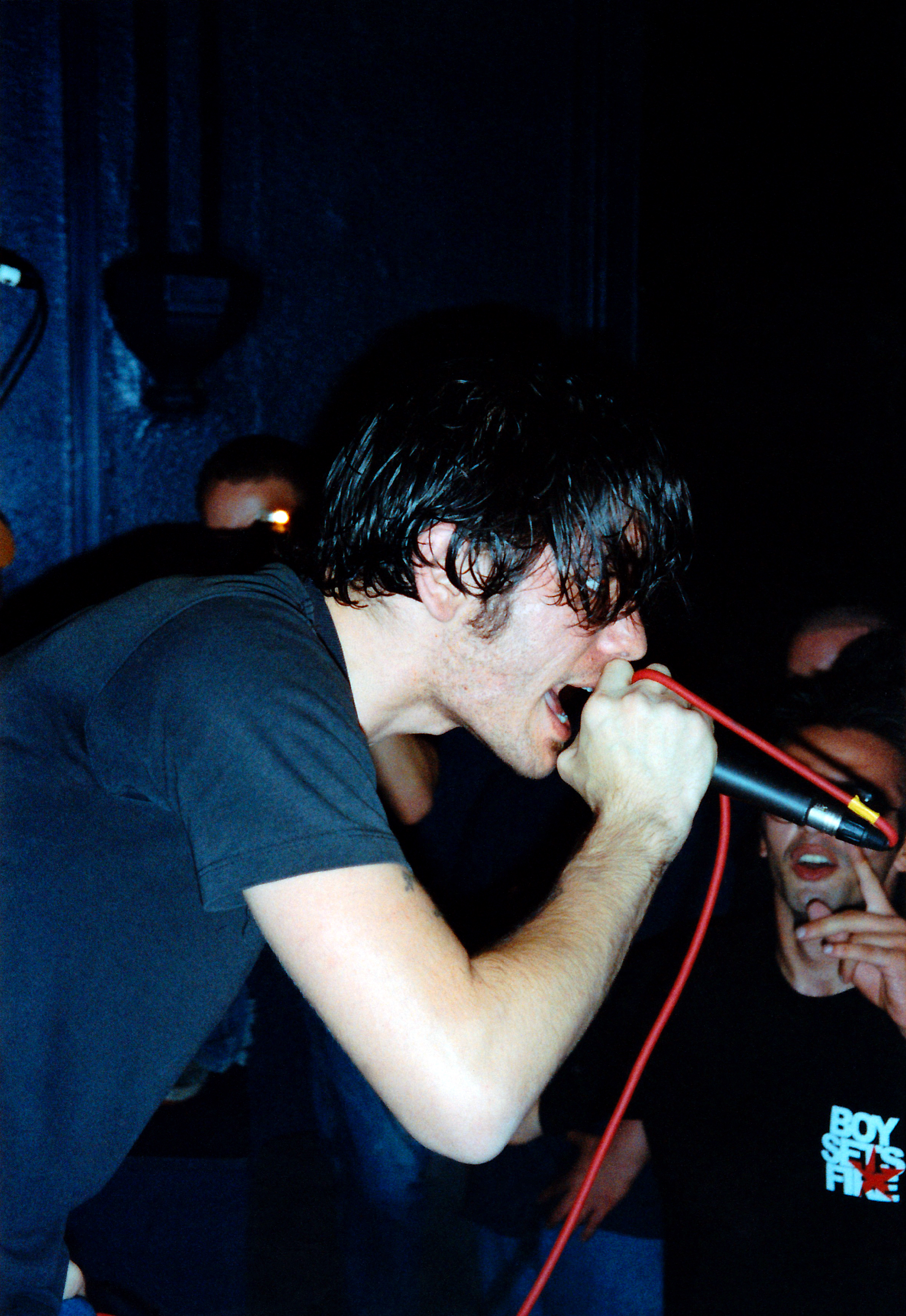
Moyal performing with As Friends Rust at The Star and Garter in Manchester, England on August 24, 2000.

During the first half of 2000, As Friends Rust went on mini tours with New Jersey hardcore band Fast Times and Washington D.C. hardcore band Good Clean Fun, and also played The Copper Sun Indie Records Winter Festival in Wilkes-Barre, Pennsylvania, the Detroit Festival, in Detroit, Michigan and Krazy Fest 3 in Louisville, Kentucky. In June 2000, Doghouse Records re-issued The Fists of Time: An Anthology of Short Fiction and Non-Fiction on compact disc, 12-inch vinyl and digitally. As Friends Rust immediately embarked on a four-week tour to promote the release, playing shows across the entire United States with Virginia hardcore band Strike Anywhere. The tour included such festivals as Mixed Messages in Minneapolis, Minnesota, Pheer Festival, in College Park, Maryland and Hellfest 2K in Auburn, New York (which As Friends Rust did not play due to a last-minute change in venue).

In July 2000, Good Life Recordings invited As Friends Rust back to Europe for a week's worth of shows in Belgium and the Netherlands, including a performance at Dour Festival in Dour, Belgium and another at Metropolis Festival in Rotterdam, Netherlands. In mid-August 2000, the band returned to Europe for a full five-week tour, which included a handful of cross-over shows with Canadian hardcore band Grade and New Jersey hardcore band Ensign. This European tour also included stops at Ieperfest in Ypres, Belgium and TurboPunk Festival, in Poznań, Poland. Tensions during the European tour caused three of the five members of As Friends Rust to quit the band.

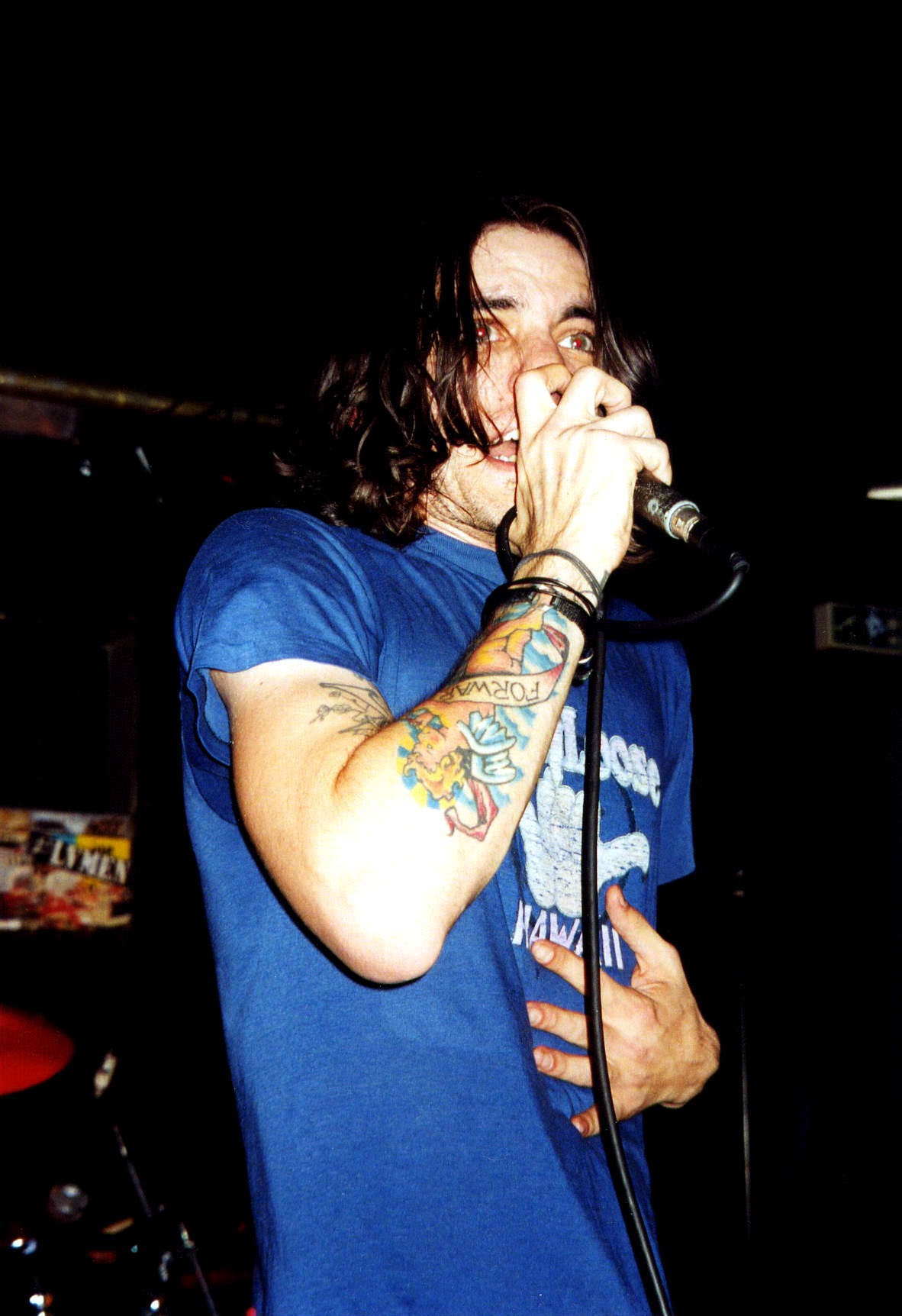
Moyal performing with As Friends Rust in promotion of Won at Underground in Cologne, Germany on November 4, 2001.

Moyal again reconstructed the band, recruiting former Culture, Crucible and Morning Again bass guitarist Christopher "Floyd" Beckham, former Twelve Tribes drummer Alexander Vernon and future Rehasher bass guitarist Guillermo Amador. This line-up recorded two songs at Goldentone with McGregor in February 2001, both of which were released as Morningleaver / This Is Me Hating You by Doghouse Records as part of its 7-inch vinyl Fan Series in March 2001. After further line-up changes, As Friends Rust record its debut full-length Won in July 2001, with producer James Paul Wisner at Wisner Productions. Former As Friends Rust drummer Matthew Crum contributed additional percussion, while backing vocals were provided by Further Seems Forever bass guitarist Chad Neptune. Won was delayed by several months, ultimately being released in October 2001, in the United States by Doghouse Records, in Japan by Howling Bull Entertainment and in Europe by German record label Defiance Records.

As Friends Rust began touring full-time in support of Won, starting with an American summer tour supported by Vangard, Keepsake and Further Seems Forever in August and September 2001. The last leg of the American tour was cut short due to the September 11 attacks in New York City, but the band managed to perform at Orlando Magic Festival in Orlando, Florida, Furnace Fest in Birmingham, Alabama, and Philly Music Festival in Philadelphia, Pennsylvania. As Friends Rust then reunited with Strike Anywhere for a five-week European tour from October to December 2001. In promotion of these shows, British record label Golf Records reissued the band's earlier compilation album Eleven Songs on compact disc. A highlight performance at London, England's Camden Underworld from November 16, 2001, was filmed and later released on video and DVD by British record label Punkervision in December 2002. As Friends Rust played its last show of 2001 at Gainesvillefest in Gainesville, Florida.

In February 2002, As Friends Rust recorded six songs at Wisner Productions with producer James Paul Wisner, as part of a one-off loan-out to Equal Vision Records. Tension within the band resulted with Moyal recording his vocals separately, without the other four members' presence. A week later, Moyal quit As Friends Rust, citing dissatisfaction with touring and wanting to focus on school, but encouraged the band to find a new vocalist and continue under the established name. At the time of his departure, As Friends Rust was already in the midst of booking an entire year's worth of tours. The final recordings with Moyal were released on A Young Trophy Band in the Parlance of Our Times in May 2002 on compact disc and 12-inch vinyl by Equal Vision Records in the United States and Defiance Records in Europe. As Friends Rust continued on with Beckham initially taking over vocal duties, until Adam D'Zurilla came in as proper vocalist. The band honored its touring obligations throughout the summer, but by September 2002, the remaining members opted to rename the band Salem.

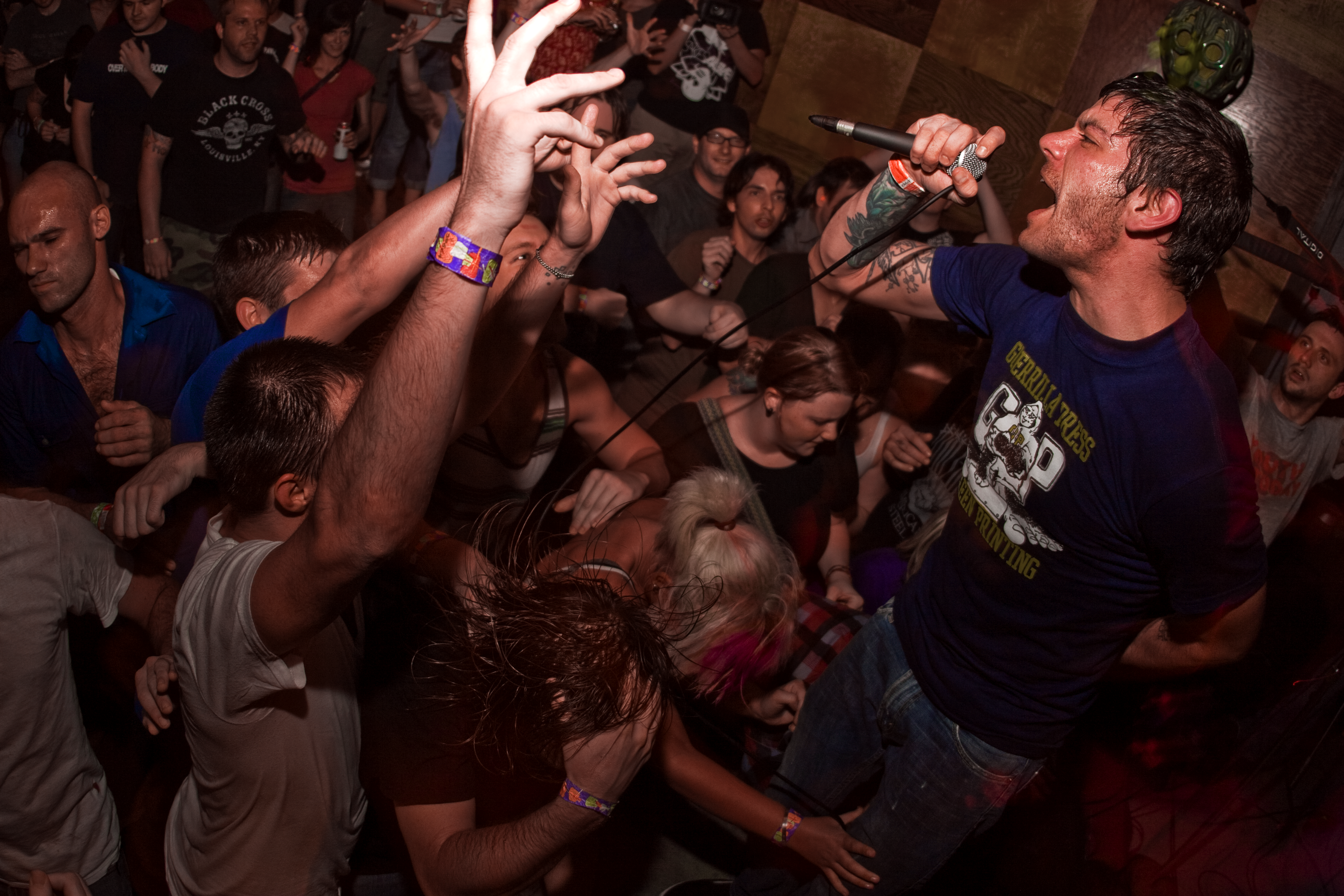
Moyal performing with As Friends Rust at the band's first reunion show on August 15, 2008, at The Atlantic in Gainesville, Florida.

In March 2008, Moyal announced that As Friends Rust would regroup for a series of European shows. It was further revealed that the band would be performing with its 1998–2000 line-up, for a total of six European shows (including Ieperfest) and a single American show in Gainesville, Florida. In 2011, Moyal announced that As Friends Rust had begun to demo new material, though the band was not satisfied with the material. In 2014, As Friends Rust travelled to Asia for the Japan Tour 2014, which spanned from June 12–15, 2014, supported by Japanese hardcore bands Endzweck, Noy and Nervous Light of Sunday. In promotion of the tour, Japanese record label Cosmic Note released a compact disc best of compilation titled Greatest Hits?, which included a selection of the bands recordings from 1996 to 2002, hand-picked by Moyal. The compilation was also released on compact cassette by Indonesian record label D'Kolektif in December 2014, and on 12-inch vinyl by Dutch record label Shield Recordings in April 2015.

As Friends Rust played three shows in 2015: the first at Saint Vitus in Brooklyn, New York; the second at Groezrock in Meerhout, Belgium; the last at The Fest in Gainesville, Florida. In May 2015, German record label Demons Run Amok Entertainment released The Porch Days: 1998 to 2000 on 12-inch vinyl. The release compiled all of the band's studio recordings from 1998 to 2000, as well as previously unreleased live recordings of two of the three songs composed-but-never-properly-recorded by the band with that line-up. As Friends Rust performed three shows in 2019: one at The Kingsland in Brooklyn, New York, and two on the same day at Molotow in Hamburg, Germany as part of the Booze Cruise Festival. Later that year, they recorded two new songs, their first in nearly two decades, which were released in July 2020 on the 7-inch vinyl Up from the Muck by Unity Worldwide Records. In September 2021, Moyal revealed in an interview that As Friends Rust was working on a new full-length album.

=== Bridgeburner R (1999–2000) ===
In the summer of 1999, Moyal teamed up with As Friends Rust bass guitarist and backing vocalist Kaleb Stewart, Radon drummer Bill Clower, and ex-Speak 714 guitarist Eryc Simmerer, to form the hardcore punk band Bridgeburne R. The band recorded eight songs at Goldentone Studios with Rob McGregor in September 1999: "T.V. Gone Awry", "Girls Up Front!", "OK, One Positive Song, But That's It.", For the Kidding", "Hardcore Means I'm Not Allowed to Smile", "Myth of Terrorism", "Holocaust Revisionism" and "We Mean Business". The material would only be released an entire year later by Belgian record label Genet Records, on the band's sole album, a compact disc titled What Do You Know About Bridgeburne R? 1986-1992 The Singles Collection.

To market the release, the band took on a fictional persona as a defunct hardcore punk act from Texas, once active from 1986 to 1993 (according to the album liner notes), or 1984 to 1994 (according to the press release). The liner notes proclaimed the release as a collection of songs lifted from its out-of-print records from the late 1980s and early 1990s, including split 7-inch vinyls with Born Against and Nausea. The press release also proclaimed that Bridgeburne R had headlined tours with such supporting acts as Black Flag, Bad Religion, Negative Approach, Biohazard and Nuclear Assault between 1985 and 1994.

To support the album, Bridgeburne R embarked on a real three-week European tour, which spanned from September to October 2000, accompanied by American hardcore band Fall Silent. Stewart, however, quit the band a week before the tour (at the same time as he quit As Friends Rust); Mykel Tre Beaton replaced him as bass guitarist for the tour.

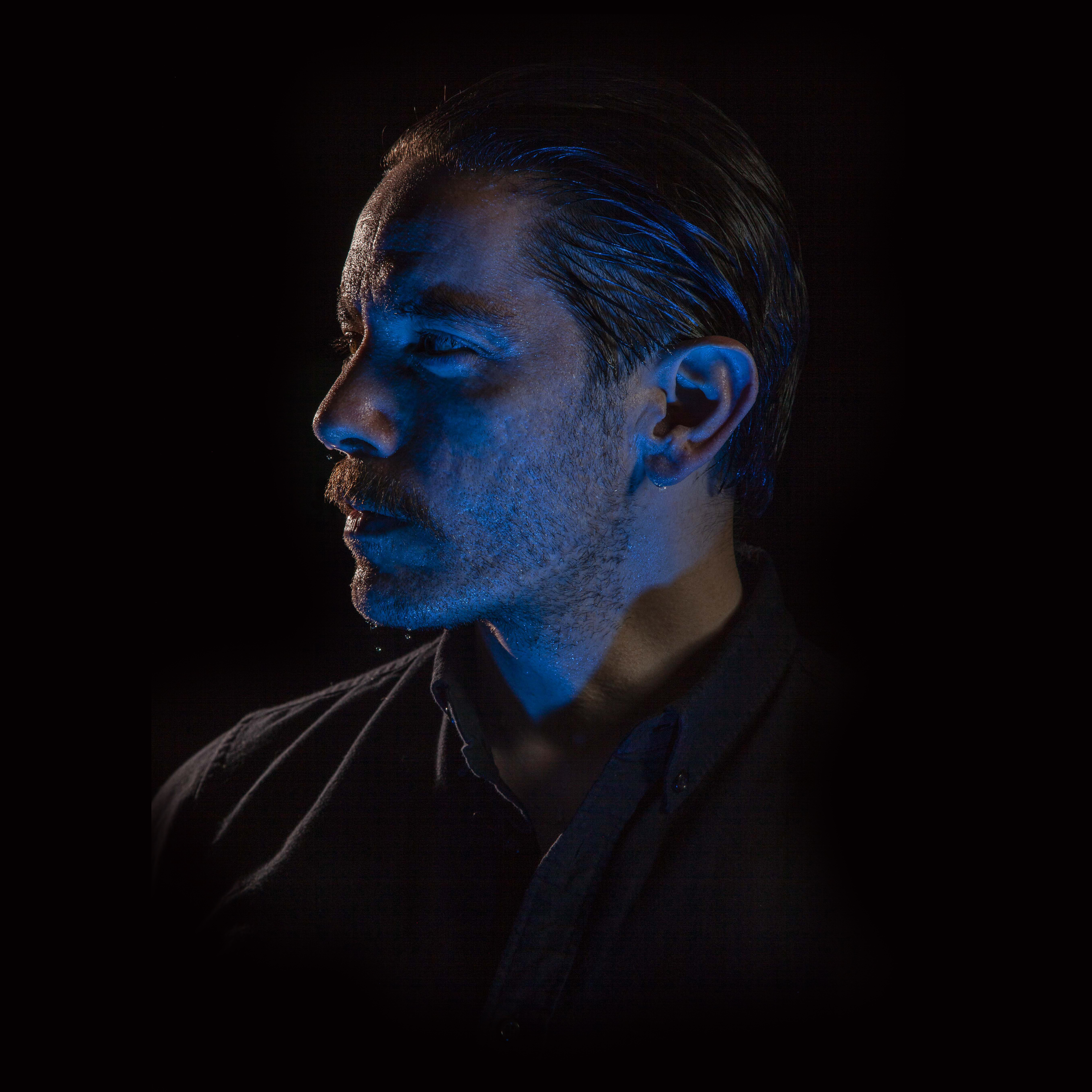
Moyal in a promotional Damien Done picture on December 26, 2018.

=== Rubbers and Damien Done (2002–present) ===
After leaving As Friends Rust in February 2002, Moyal began working on solo material under the moniker Rubbers. Rubbers was renamed Damien Done and the band was immediately signed to Belgian record label Good Life Recordings. Handling vocals and acoustic guitar, Moyal recruited drummer and keyboardist Matthew Crum, then member of The Rocking Horse Winner; electric guitarist Juan Montoya, formerly of Floor and Cavity and later of Torche; and electric guitarist and bass guitarist James Paul Wisner to record the six-song debut EP Love Thongs in September 2003. Wisner also engineered and produced the session. Love Thongs was scheduled for release through Good Life Recordings as a CD and DVD combo package in April 2004, but the release remained stuck in limbo for over a decade.

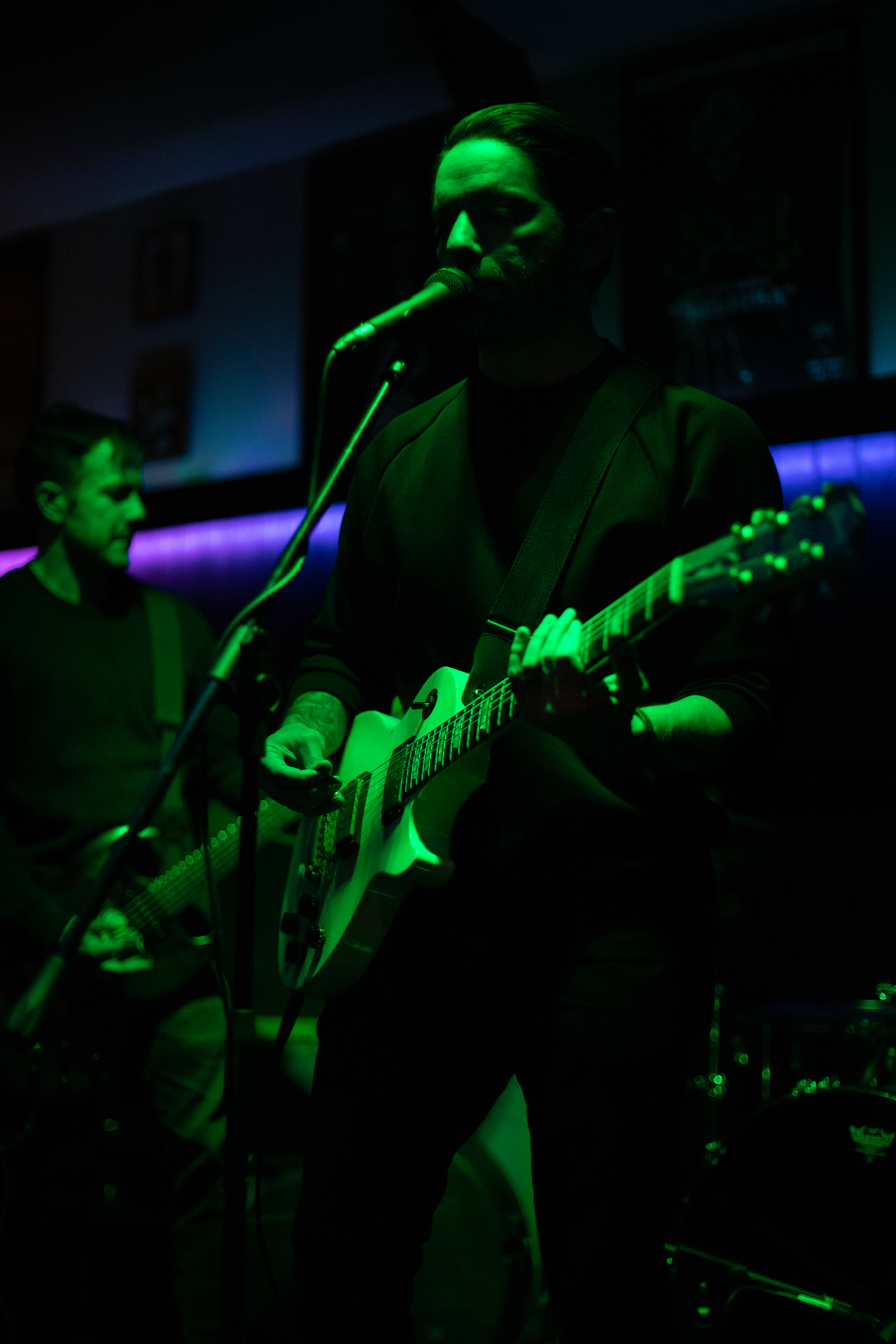
Moyal (right) and Andrew Dempz (left) performing with Damien Done at Whiskey's Unrockbar in Osnabrück, Germany on August 11, 2018.

While awaiting the release of Love Thongs, Moyal recruited several new musicians, including former I Hate Myself drummer Jon Marberger; former Shai Hulud, Cavity, 108, Against All Authority and Where Fear and Weapons Meet drummer (and then-member of Hazen Street and Until the End) Jason Lederman; former Where Fear and Weapons Meet, Dashboard Confessional and Seville bass guitarist Dan Bonebrake; and former Glasseater guitarist (and future Poison the Well touring guitarist) Ariel Arro. With Arro, Damien Done recorded a cover of Integrity's song "Eighteen", which was released on Escapist Records' Various Artists compilation Harder They Fall: Tribute to Integrity in February 2007.

Love Thongs was eventually renamed Stay Black and was finally released on 12-inch vinyl by German record label Demons Run Amok Entertainment in July 2016. Demons Run Amok Entertainment simultaneously released a 7-inch vinyl of two newly recorded Damien Done songs: "He Really Tried" and "And Now the Rain" The new songs featured drummer Timothy Kirkpatrick, formerly of Moments in Grace; bass guitarist Mike Hasty, formerly of Walls of Jericho; and electric guitarist Juan Montoya. Hasty also engineered and produced the session.

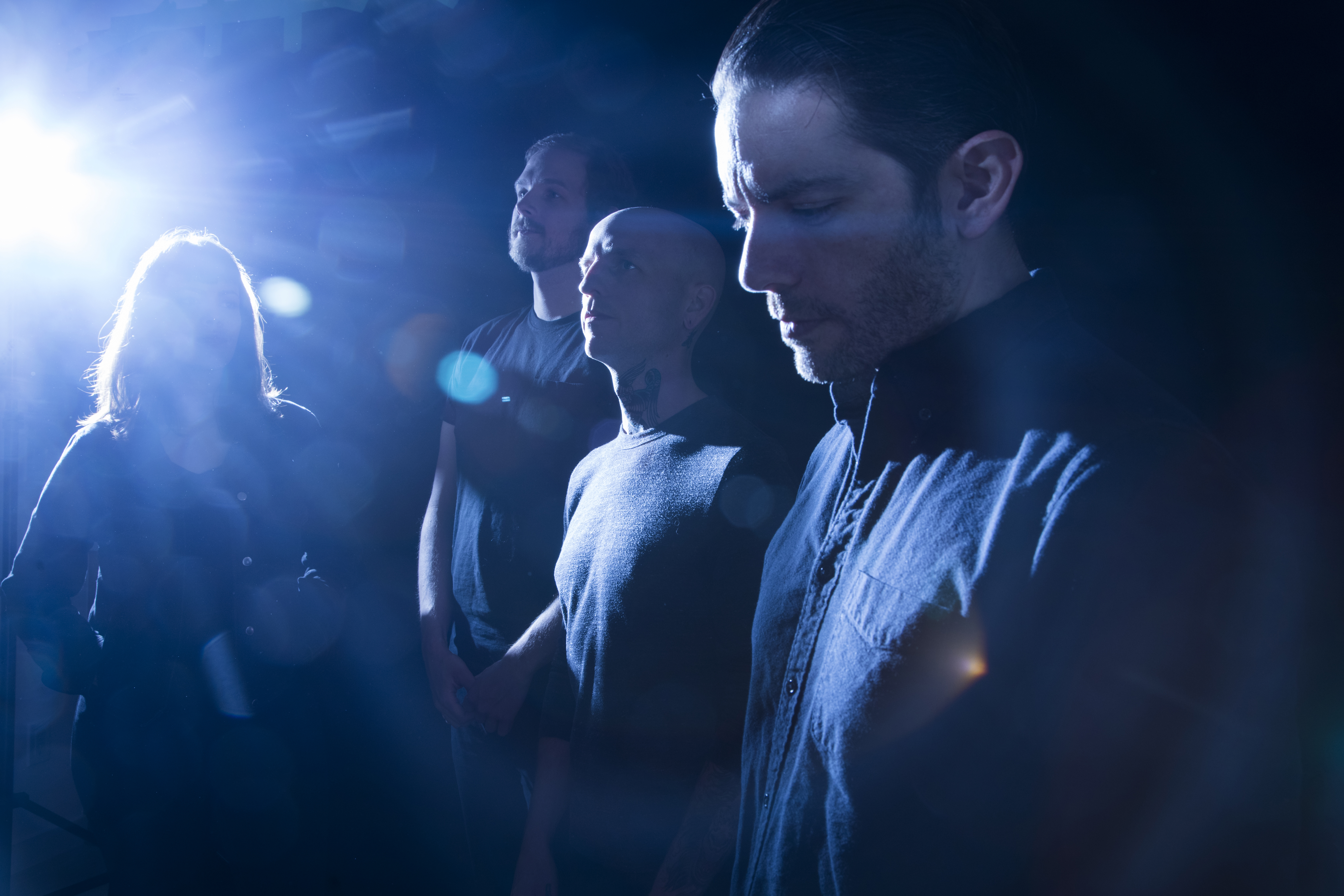
Damien Done as a full band on June 13, 2019. From left to right: Laura Jane Leonard, Tyler Kane, Benjamin Moore and Moyal.

In December 2016, Moyal rebuilt the band with former Child Bite drummer Benjamin Moore, former Earthmover guitarist Andrew Dempz, and bass guitarist Laura Jane Leonard. In 2017, the band was signed to California-based record label Mind Over Matter Records, releasing in September of that same year a 7-inch vinyl single of two new songs: "Curious Thing" and a cover of Killing Joke's "Primitive". Damien Done follow-up with Charm Offensive, the band's first full-length album, released on 12-inch vinyl by Mind Over Matter Records in March 2018. The album was released on 12-inch vinyl in Europe by Belgian record label Hypertension Records, and promoted through a nine-date European tour in August 2018. The band kicked-off their European tour by playing at Ieperfest in Ypres, Belgium, followed by shows in Germany, Czech Republic, Hungary, Austria and England.

On Valentine's Day 2020, Damien Done released the digital EP Baby, Don't Hearse Me; an 11" screen-printed vinyl version was released by Mind Over Matter Records a month later. The band quickly followed up with the To Night EP, released digitally in May 2020; a tape edition was released by Contraband Goods in October 2020, while Mind Over Matter Records and Speedowax Records co-released a double 7-inch vinyl version a year later in October 2021. In November 2020, Damien Done released the three-song EP Demos from the Year 2020, which includes working versions of the band's forthcoming full-length album, Total Power. In February 2021, Damien Done released the single "Nightclubbing", a cover of the 1977 Iggy Pop and David Bowie song. On January 31, 2023, "Pray for Me", the first single from Total Power, was released; the album is scheduled for release through Mind Over Matter Records on May 19, 2023.

=== On Bodies (2011–2017) ===
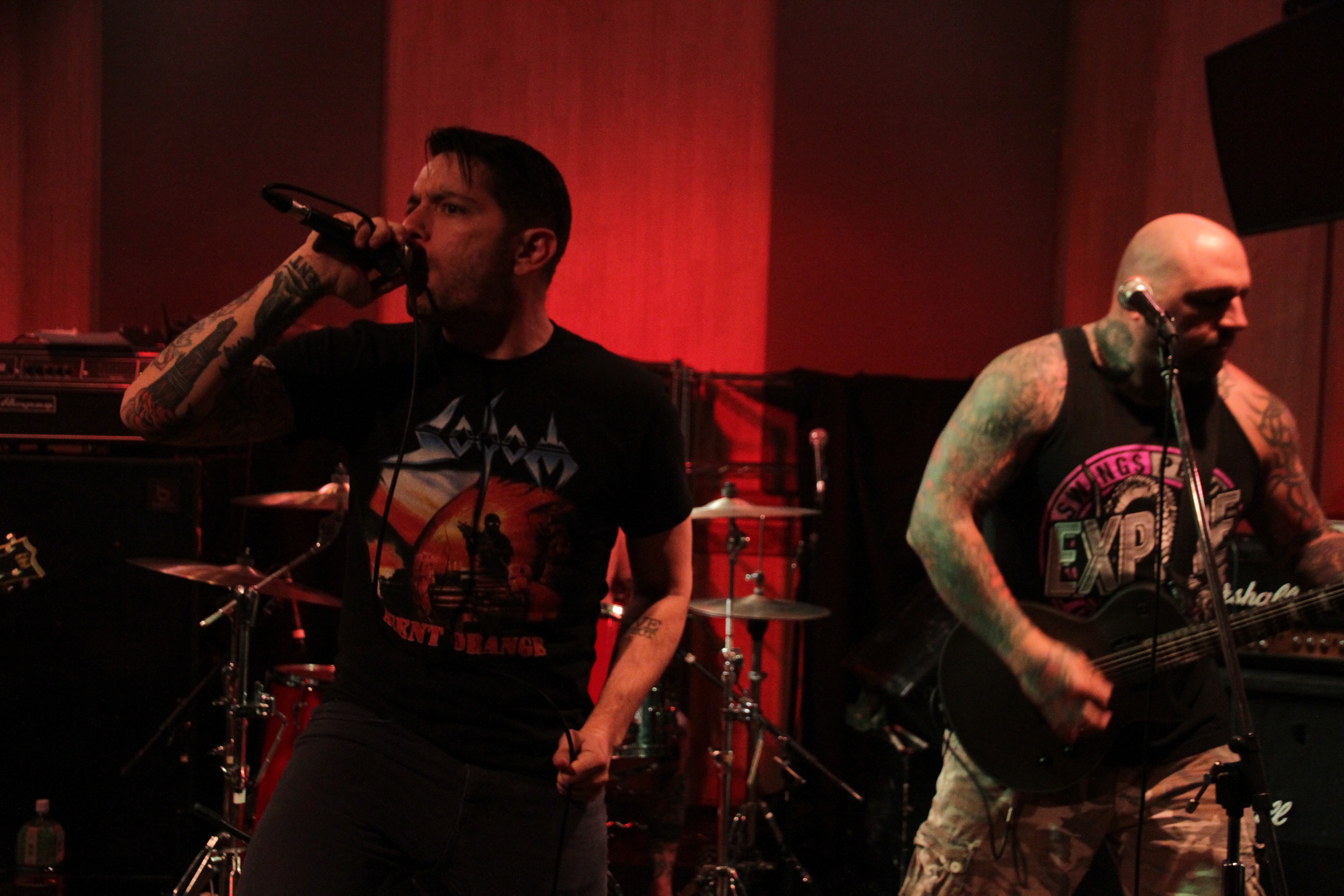
On Bodies performing at Nishi-Ogikubo Flat in Tokyo, Japan on March 5, 2015. From left to right: Moyal and Richard Thurston.

In 2011, Moyal rejoined former Culture member Richard Thurston to start up the hardcore band On Bodies, which the pair had been discussing since 2009. After tracking nine songs as a two-piece for their debut EP Planet Hospice (with Thurston playing all the instruments), the band was immediately signed to John Wylie's record label Eulogy Recordings. On Bodies recruited drummer Julio Marin and guitarists Richard Walbert and Chad Kishick (with Thurston assuming bass guitarist duties) in time for the EP-release shows in February 2012. Planet Hospice was released on CD by Eulogy Recordings and on vinyl by American Enemy Records.

The full band next recorded five songs for their sophomore EP, The Long Con, released after some delay in May 2013 on vinyl through German record label Coffee Breath and Heartache, and much later, again on vinyl through American record label Irish VooDoo in March 2015. Irish Voodoo also released the band's third EP, Unremarkably Mortal, on vinyl in August 2015, which was again recorded as a two-piece band (with Thurston playing all the instruments).

In March 2015, On Bodies embarked on a Japanese tour promoting a compilation of their second and third EPs, Unremarkably Mortal + The Long Con, released on compact disc through Cosmic Note. The band by then consisted of Moyal on vocals, Thurston and Zachary Colina on guitars, Josh King on bass and former Culture drummer Joshua Williams. Later that year, Williams was replaced by Boone Haley and King was replaced by Megan Schroer. German record label Demons Run Amok Entertainment released the compilation Unremarkably Mortal + The Long Con on vinyl in September 2015.

=== Ekstasis (2022–present) ===
In April 2022, Moyal teamed up with Canadian multi-instrumentalist David Williams to form the death metal band Ekstasis. The pair recorded a four-song demo, which included the tracks "Magmatic Decimation", "Paralyzing Impermanence", "Holes" and the Morgoth cover "Eternal Sanctity"; the material was eventually released as the band's debut extended play, Paralyzing Impermanence, on cassette tape and digitally through American record label Unspeakable Axe Records, on October 28, 2022. After the recording of the demo, but before it was released, the band recruited Swedish drummer Fred Estby.

=== Other bands and guest contributions ===
One of Moyal's lesser-known bands was Some Sort of Radio, a metal project which was active from late 1998 to early 1999, and featured guitarists Joseph Simmons and Robert Proctor (from Assück), bass guitarist Gordon Tarpley, and drummer Bradley Bulifant. The band was named after an unreleased As Friends Rust song, and although recordings of rehearsals exist, Some Sort of Radio never entered a studio nor played a show.

Moyal and Kaleb Stewart also collaborated on a number of projects outside of As Friends Rust and Bridgeburne R. In autumn of 2002, Moyal co-produced Stewart's band Grey Goose's Love EP, which was originally planned for release on Good Life Recordings, but was shelved by the record company (in a similar situation that Damien Done would go through a year later). Moyal also contributed vocals to a number of songs on the release. In January 2005, Moyal and Stewart formed an acoustic folk duo named Goodnight at the End of the Tunnel, which recorded the single "Lately It's the Cross", produced by Moyal. In May 2005, Moyal produced and contributed vocals and synthesizers to Stewart's acoustic project Bread Riot.

In March 2002, shortly after departing from As Friends Rust, Moyal contributed guest vocals to Gainesville pop punk band Loyal Frisby's song "Deceitful Happiness and Made Up Pain". The song was recorded at Goldentone Studios with Rob McGregor and was released in May 2002 on Loyal Frisby's split CD with Rick Derris and Mindlikewater.

In September 2003, Moyal invited guitarist Juan Montoya to contribute to Damien Done's Love Thongs EP. In return, Montoya invited Moyal to contributed guest vocals to his band Pandabite's song "Painkiller", which was recorded that same month at The Dungeon with producer Jeremy Dubois, and released on their sole EP Doom Box later that year.

In 2006, shortly before relocating to Ann Arbor, Michigan, Moyal briefly played in the Miami, Florida metallic hardcore band Best Wishes. The band included guitarists Richard Walbert and Ariel Arro, bass guitarist Chad Kishick, and drummer Brian Ray.

Throughout 2008, Moyal (under the pseudonym DJ Done) and Nik Fortman (under the pseudonym Dead Nik) hosted a series of old-school punk and metal nights named Old Man Underground. The events were held several times a month in various clubs around Ann Arbor and Ypsilanti, Michigan.

In 2015, Moyal contributed guest vocals to Belgian metalcore band Deconsecrate's song "Planetary Holocaust"; the track was released on the album Nothing Is Scared, through Good Life Recordings in May 2015. In 2016, Moyal contributed guest vocals to French metalcore band Lazare's song "Mass Murder of Clear Minds"; the track was released on the album From Hate... With Love, through French record label Terrain Vague on October 14, 2016.

In 2019, Moyal contributed guest vocals to American artist Nathaniel Shannon & The Vanishing Twin's song "Mater Suspiriorum", which appeared on the concept EP The Three Mothers, released by Aqualamb Records on October 20, 2020. In 2021, Moyal contributed guest vocals to American electro-pop artist La Femme Pendu's song "La Somnambule", which appeared on her album Vampyr, released on October 22, 2021.
