= Where Fear and Weapons Meet (band) =

- Origin: Fort Lauderdale, Florida, US
- Genres: Hardcore punk
- Years active: 1998–2004, 2012
- Labels: Alveran; Eulogy; Revelation; Temperance; Think Fast!; Triple Crown
- Past members: Alex Roundhouse; John Wylie; Richard Walbert; Dan Bonebrake; Jason Lederman; Ryan Primack; Jessie Steele; Tim Pryce; Scott Glazer; Chad Kishick; Joe Caro

Where Fear and Weapons Meet was a hardcore punk band from South Florida. The group's first EP appeared in 1998; they followed it with a full-length in 1999, both on Revelation Records, and won nationwide exposure. They then released a split with Comin' Correct before returning with another full-length, Unstoppable, on Triple Crown Records. Their final release was Control, in 2003.

In June 2012, it was announced that the band will reunite the following October at the Bringin' It Back For The Kids Fest 2 in Pompano Beach, Florida.

== Discography ==
- Where Fear and Weapons Meet EP (Revelation Records, 1998)
- The Weapon (Revelation Records, 1999)
- Split (Temperance Records, 2000)
- Unstoppable (Triple Crown Records, 2001)
- Control (Eulogy Recordings, 2003)
