= Surprise Attack Records =

Surprise Attack Records, sometimes called SA Mob is an independent record label based in Erie, Pennsylvania, although the bands are from Miami, Elkview, Erie, and even Adelaide, Australia. Surprise Attack Records signs Hardcore punk bands. In the early 2000s, the record label had close affiliations with Canadian record labels Goodfellow Records and Redstar Records.

== Roster ==
current and past bands

- 7 Generations
- All Hell Breaks Loose
- The Break In
- Brother's Keeper
- Die Young
- Hank Jones
- Holden Caulfield
- Pound for Pound
- Prayer for Cleansing
- Problem Solver Revolver
- Rise and Fall
- ShotPointBlank
- Target Nevada
- Twentyfour Hours to Live
- Van Damage
- When Tigers Fight
- Where it Ends

== See also ==
- List of record labels
