= Glasseater =

American post-hardcore band

- Origin: Miami, Florida, United States
- Genres: Post-hardcore melodic hardcore
- Years active: 1998–2003, 2010, 2013
- Labels: Ides of March Records; Eulogy Recordings; Fearless Records; Victory Records
- Past members: Jason Calleiro; Julio Marin; Juan Carlos "JC" Lopez; Ariel Arro; Matt Fox; Willy Tijerino; Anthony Lopez; Nate Van Damme

Glasseater was a post-hardcore band from Miami, Florida. The band formed in 1998 as a duo, eventually expanding to a quintet.

== History ==
The band signed to Matt Fox's record label Ides of March in 1999, releasing their debut album Miles Ahead of Where We Left Off. A second album, 7 Years Bad Luck, was released on Eulogy Recordings in 2000. In promotion of the release, the band embarked on a six-week tour of the United States with Mid Carson July and The Agency in June and July 2000. The tour included several cross-over shows with As Friends Rust and Strike Anywhere (the two of which were touring together), as well as a stop to play Hellfest 2K.

In 2001, the band was signed to a three-record contract with Fearless Records. The first release through Fearless Records was a remixed and remastered version of 7 Years Bad Luck, which included two bonus tracks. 2002 saw a reissue of Miles Ahead of Where We Left Off on Dead Droid records, while Fearless Records released the band's eponymous third album. Nationwide touring ensued, opening for Black Flag, 311, Dashboard Confessional, and Pennywise.

By January 2003, differences between the band and Fearless Records lead to a release from their contract (which had one album left), and the band quickly signed with Victory Records to release their fourth album, Everything is Beautiful When You Don't Look Down.

=== Reunion shows ===
Glasseater performed a final time in Miami on July 31, 2010, at Churchill's Pub. The show involved both versions of the band with original vocalist Jason Calleiro and later vocalist Julio Marin alternating vocal duties throughout the show. The show is considered their reunion as well as their final show, because the band never played a farewell show before their hiatus in 2003.

The band announced in December 2013 that they would reunite for at least one show at Churchill's Pub Miami on February 22, 2014

The band was supposed to perform at Furnace Fest 2021 for a reunion show but were replaced with As Cities Burn with a message on Instagram wishing that Julio Marin "gets well soon", but never explaining why. People in the comments who know Marin say that he was undergoing chemotherapy.

== Members ==
- Jason Calleiro - vocals (1998–2001)
- Julio Marin - vocals/drums (1998–2005, later joined On Bodies)
- Juan Carlos "JC" Lopez - guitar (later joined Stretch Arm Strong)
- Ariel Arro - guitar (later joined Poison The Well)
- Matt Fox - bass (2000)
- Willy Tijerino- bass(1998)
- Anthony Lopez - bass
- Nate Van Damme - drums (late 2003 - 2005, later joined Hit the Lights)

== Discography ==
- Miles Ahead of Where We Left Off (Ides of March Records, 1999; re-released on Dead Droid Records 2002)
- 7 Years Bad Luck (Eulogy Recordings, 2000; re-released on Fearless Records, 2001)
- Glasseater (Fearless Records, 2002)
- Everything is Beautiful When You Don't Look Down (Victory Records, 2003)
