= Good Life Recordings =

- Founded: 1996
- Founder: Edward Verhaeghe
- Distributors: RED, Revelation, Shellshock
- Genre: Hardcore punk, metalcore, post-hardcore
- Country of origin: Belgium
- Official website: www.goodliferecordings.com

Good Life Recordings is a Belgian independent record label which was founded in 1996 by Edward Verhaeghe, who had been the lead vocalist of punk band Nations on Fire. The label specializes in hardcore punk bands. It has released albums by bands that were part of the H8000 music scene.

Between 2000 and 2003, Good Life made a deal with Trustkill Records to release limited picture discs and compilations of some of its bands.

== Artists ==
Selected artists currently or previously on the Good Life roster.

- Damien Done
- Doomsday
- Nasty
- Shelter
- 100 Demons
- 25 Ta Life
- Aftershock
- As Friends Rust
- Avenged Sevenfold
- Breach
- Brothers Keeper
- Culture
- Disciple
- Disembodied
- Dying Fetus
- Eighteen Visions
- Grey Goose
- Integrity
- In-Quest
- Morning Again
- Most Precious Blood
- Nora
- One King Down
- Poison the Well
- Racetraitor
- Sense Field
- Shai Hulud
- Skycamefalling
- The Last Year
