= Morning Again =

American metalcore band

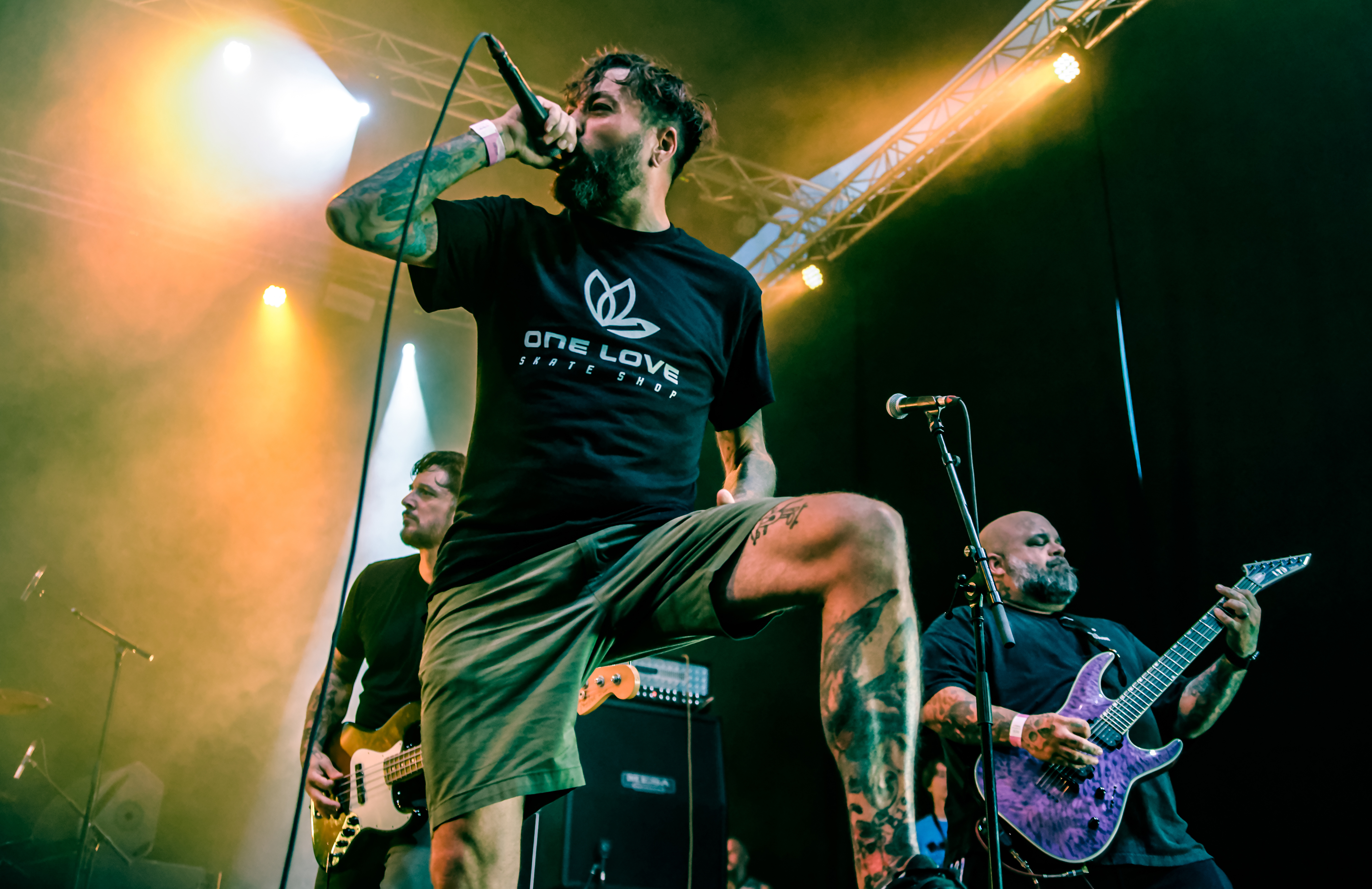
- Morning Again performing at Ieperfest in Ypres, Belgium on July 2, 2022.

Background information
- Also known as: Cleanest War (1999 reunion) Hand of Hope (2002 reunion)
- Origin: Cooper City, Florida
- Genres: Metalcore
- Years active: 1995–1998; 1999; 1999–2000; 2002; 2005; 2010–present
- Labels: Alveran; Conquer the World; Demons Run Amok; Eulogy; Good Life; Immigrant Sun; Intention; Moo Cow; Revelation; Stick to the Core
- Members: John Wylie; Eric Ervin; Damien Moyal; Stephen Looker; Joshua Williams
- Past members: Kevin Byers; Chad Gilbert; Joseph Simmons; Wes Keely; Chris Common; Richard Walbert; (see Members section for others)

Morning Again is an American metalcore band from Florida. They were known for their metallic sound as well as for their straight edge, vegan, anti-religious and anti-government ideals. The band was a "sister band" to Culture, often switching members after one had left the other. Several members went on to play in other bands such as As Friends Rust and Dead Blue Sky. The band was originally from Cooper City, Florida, but moved to Coral Springs in 1998 before breaking up later that year. After playing several reunion shows over the years, the band released a new EP in 2018.

== History ==
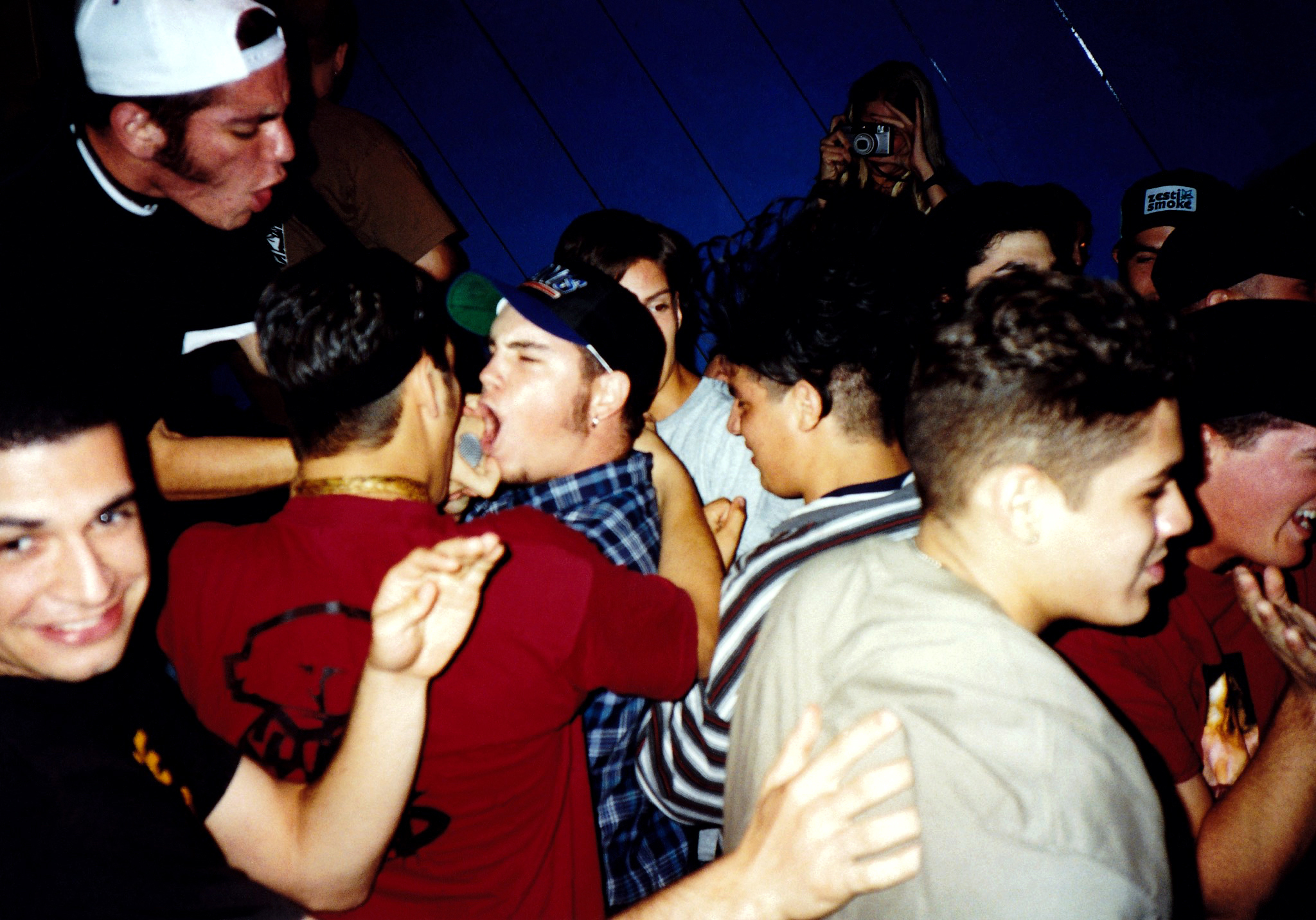
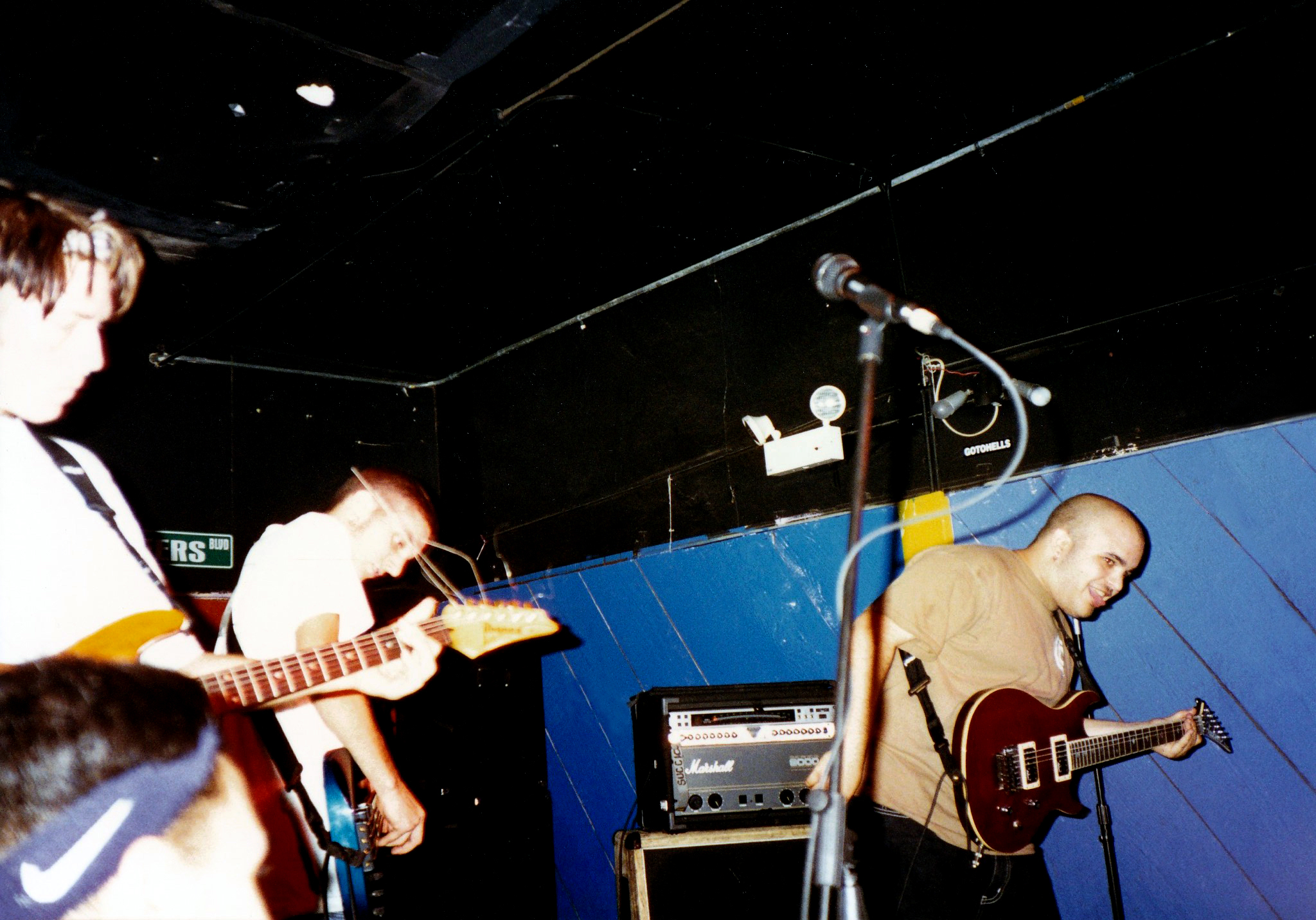
Morning Again performing at Cheers in Coconut Grove, Florida on June 11, 1996. Top: Damien Moyal; bottom: Michel Wolz, Eric Ervin and John Wylie,

John Wylie who had left Culture earlier that year wanted a band with more intense and personal views. In December 1995, Morning Again was formed with Damien Moyal and Louie Long who had both been in Culture in the two prior years, on vocals and drums. Michael Wolz came in on second guitar, and Eric Ervin on bass. The band recorded the EP The Cleanest War, which was sent to Conquer the World Records as it had released Born of You and the members were familiar with it. The label agreed to put it out, and the band made some promo tapes to help promote the upcoming release. Soon after the mini-album came out, Intention Records, who had also worked with Culture on their split with Roosevelt, asked John to release a 7-inch of new material. After landing a deal with the then-new label Good Life Recordings (as the first American band on the label) in Belgium (H8000 area), a compilation of all the released material was compiled for the European market.

Tensions between Moyal and Wylie once again surfaced, as they had in Culture. During one of the last shows with Moyal, Morning Again played with Ohio band Outcast. Byers and Wylie were getting along well and he was asked to replace Moyal. Within a week Byers had moved to Cooper City and was the new vocalist. During this time Ervin was also replaced, first by Christopher "Floyd" Beckham, then by Peter Bartsocas (who was in Bird of Ill Omen, a band that had toured with MA early that year, and was on Wylie's record label). Immediately they started working on new songs, which would be released on a split with Shoulder on Moo Cow Records. Wolz and Bartsocas left almost immediately after, and after some short-lived members, Jerry Villarroel became the bassist. They released another 7-inch, as a four piece, on Immigrant Sun Records, My Statement of Life in a Dying World. Joseph Simmons would come in as second guitarist after sophomore Good Life release, Martyr, was recorded. Matt Thomas came in to replace Long and the band gained attention of Revelation Records who quickly signed them. As Tradition Dies Slowly was released on Revelation in 1998.

They released their final record for Good Life, a split with 25 Ta Life, and went back to Europe to tour. The group ultimately decided on breaking up by the end of the tour in the fall of 1998, partially as a result of Wylie's growing interest in pursuing Eulogy Recordings. Their final release was To Die a Bitter Death on Immigrant Sun. In 2000, Wylie's own label released a compilation of both Immigrant Sun Records 7-inches as The Fallen... The Few That Remain.

=== Reunions ===
The band has since done multiple reunion shows. The first was in 1999, where they played under the name Cleanest War, which featured Damien Moyal back on vocals as well as Wylie and Ervin from the original line-up. The second was under the name Hand of Hope in 2002, where they had merchandise made specially for the show in Orlando, Florida. In 2003, a compilation of Hand of Hope and Martyr, Hand of the Martyr, was released by Eulogy Recordings. The line up for that show was Moyal on vocals, Wylie on guitar, Ervin on bass and Wes Keely on drums. On April 22, 2011, they performed at the Groezrock festival in Belgium, with Kevin Byers on vocals. For this show they also had unique merchandise made. In 2014 they played at the Belgian hardcore festival Ieperfest in the H8000 area. Moyal was on vocals during this show with Ervin on bass and Josh Williams on drums. Later that year with Kevin Byers on vocals, they played in Japan for the Bloodaxe festival as well as a few shows in Tokyo and Nagoya. In 2015 they played This is Hardcore in Philadelphia, PA

In July 2018, it was announced that the group rejoined once again and were recording new material (to be issued as an extended play through Revelation). The Survival Instinct EP was released on November 9, 2018. The band has announced a week-long European tour for 2022. In 2022, the band is releasing a new EP, Borrowed Time, on Revelation Records.

In January 2026 it was announced that Damien Moyal would be filling in for Kevin Byers on Morning Again's European tour later that year. Byers being unable to tour due to a shoulder injury. In July of the same year the band parted ways with Byers, with Moyal taking over vocal duties going forward. In a public statement the band said about the split with Byers: "We want to express our deepest appreciation to our brother Kevin, who over the past thirty years has been a massive part of the band. His talent, friendship, and the music we created together are an essential part of the band’s history and we’re incredibly proud of everything we’ve accomplished together."

== Members ==
Current lineup

- John Wylie – guitar (1995–1998, 1999, 2002, 2005, 2010–2012, 2015—present)
- Eric Ervin – bass guitar (1995–1996, 1999, 2002, 2014, 2019—present)
- Damien Moyal – vocals (1995–1996, 1999, 2002, 2014, 2026—present)
- Stephen Looker – guitar, backing vocals (1996, 1998, 2010—present)
- Joshua Williams – drums (2014—present)

Former members and touring musicians

* César Morales – lead vocals (1995)
- Louie Long – drums (1995–1997)
- Michael Wolz – guitar (1995–1996)
- Christopher "Floyd" Beckham – bass guitar (1996)
- Peter Bartsocas – bass guitar (1996), guitar (1996, 2014)
- Eric McCarthy – bass guitar (1996)
- Joseph Simmons – bass guitar (1996), guitar (1997–1998, 1999)
- Chad Gilbert – bass guitar (1996)
- Gerardo Villaroel – bass guitar (1996–1998, 2010–2011, 2015–2018)
- Ryan Stafford – guitar (1997)
- Matthew Thomas – drums (1997–1998, 1999–2000, 2005, 2010–2011)
- Chris Common – bass guitar (1999–2000)
- Aaron Hiser – guitar (1999–2000)
- Nathan Stambro – guitar (1999–2000)
- Jason Dooley – drums (1999)
- Wes Keely – drums (2002)
- Justin Gianoutsos – drums (2012)
- Richard Walbert – bass guitar (2012), guitar (2014)
- Kevin Byers – lead vocals (1996–1999, 1999–2000, 2005, 2010—2026)

=== Timeline ===
- ^{Note that the Studio album and EP bars represent the release dates, not the recording dates; membership often changed between the two events.}

== Discography ==
Studio albums

- As Tradition Dies Slowly CD/LP (Revelation, 1998)

EPs and singles

- Morning Again demo tape (self-released, 1996)
- The Cleanest War 12-inch/CD (Conquer the World/Stick to the Core, 1996)
- Morning Again 7-inch (Intention Records, 1996)
- Morning Again / Shoulder split 7-inch (Moo Cow Records, 1996)
- My Statement of Life in a Dying World 7-inch (Immigrant Sun Records, 1997)
- Martyr 12-inch/CD (Good Life, 1997)
- Morning Again / 25 ta Life split 7-inch/CD (Good Life, 1998)
- To Die a Bitter Death 7-inch (Immigrant Sun, 1998)
- Survival Instinct CD (Revelation, 2018)
- Borrowed Time (Revelation, 2022)

Compilation albums

- Hand of Hope (Good Life, 1997)
- The Fallen... The Few That Remain (Eulogy, 2000)
- Hand of the Martyr (Alveran/Eulogy, 2002)
- I (Demons Run Amok Entertainment, 2015)
- II (Demons Run Amok Entertainment, 2015)

Compilation appearances

- "Martyr" - Appeared on You, Who Are Innocent, What Have You Done Worthy of Death? (1997)
- "Stones" - Appeared on West Coast Hardcore vs. East Coast Hardcore (1998)
- "To Die a Bitter Death" - Appeared on Sweet Deal! (2000)
- "Turning Over" - Appeared on Transcend (2002)
- "Turning Over" - Appeared on The Anti-Pop Sampler (2003)
