= The Porch Days: 1998 to 2000 =

2015 compilation album by As Friends Rust

Compilation album by As Friends Rust
- Released: May 22, 2015
- Recorded: March 1998 – June 26, 2000
- Venue: Ieper Hardcore Festival, Ypres, Belgium; The Moose Lodge, Long Island, New York
- Studio: Goldentone Studios, Gainesville, Florida
- Genre: Melodic hardcore; emotional hardcore
- Length: 23:11
- Label: Demons Run Amok
- Producer: Rob McGregor; As Friends Rust; Damien Moyal
- Compiler: Damien Moyal

As Friends Rust chronology
Greatest Hits? (2014)	The Porch Days: 1998 to 2000 (2015)	Up from the Muck (2020)

The Porch Days: 1998 to 2000 is a compilation album by American melodic hardcore band As Friends Rust. It was released only on vinyl by German record label Demons Run Amok Entertainment on May 22, 2015. The release compiles a selection of As Friends Rust recordings that showcase the band's most recognizable line-up, which spanned from March 1998 to October 2000. The band then consisted of lead vocalist Damien Moyal, drummer Timothy Kirkpatrick, bass guitarist and backing vocalist Kaleb Stewart, and revolving guitarists Gordon Tarpley, Joseph Simmons, Peter Bartsocas and James Glayat.

The previously released material contained within originally appeared on The Fists of Time and the split with Discount (both released 1998) and As Friends Rust (released in 1999). The compilation also includes two previously unreleased songs, which the band had written during that area, offered as live recordings since they were never recorded in studio. In promotion of The Porch Days: 1998 to 2000, As Friends Rust played a series of shows in 2015 and again in 2019, which included performances at notable festivals like Groezrock in Meerhout, Belgium, Booze Cruise in Hamburg, Germany, and The Fest in Gainesville, Florida.

== Background and content ==
The material compiled for The Porch Days: 1998 to 2000 was recorded during three different studio recording sessions and two live concerts, spanning a period of two-and-a-half years, from late March 1998 to June 26, 2000. The recordings showcase the band's most intimate and recognizable line-up, which existed from March 1998 to September 2000, and included lead vocalist Damien Moyal, drummer Timothy Kirkpatrick, bass guitarist and backing vocalist Kaleb Stewart, and revolving guitarists Gordon Tarpley, Joseph Simmons and James Glayat. Although Peter Bartsocas played guitar, bass guitar and provided backing vocals at different times during this period, he never recorded in studio with the band.

"Home Is Where the Heart Aches" was recorded in late March 1998 at Goldentone Studios in Gainesville, Florida with producer Rob McGregor. The song features the band's reformed line-up with lead vocalist Moyal, guitarists Joseph Simmons and Gordon Tarpley, bass guitarist and backing vocalist Kaleb Stewart, and drummer Timothy Kirkpatrick. Three members of Hot Water Music; Chuck Ragan, George Rebelo and Chris Wollard; as well as McGregor and all members of As Friends Rust, provided backup vocals on the song. "Home Is Where the Heart Aches" first appeared on The Fists of Time in 1998 and was also used on the split with Discount and a Various Artists compilations by Initial Records.

"The First Song on the Tape You Make Her" was recorded in October 1998 at Goldentone Studios with producer Rob McGregor. The song features lead vocalist Moyal, guitarists Simmons and Glayat, bass guitarist and backing vocalist Stewart and drummer Kirkpatrick. McGregor and Keith Welsh provided backup vocals on the song. "The First Song on the Tape You Make Her" first appeared on As Friends Rust's split with Discount, released by Good Life Recordings in 1998, and later appeared on Doghouse Records' reissue of The Fists of Time in 2000.

"Half Friend Town", "Like Strings (Spell It with a K)", "Fire on 8th and 3rd", "Coffee Black" "Scapegoat Wets the Whistle" and "Operation" were recorded on May 9, 1999, at Goldentone Studios, co-produced by Rob McGregor and As Friends Rust. The songs feature lead vocalist Moyal, guitarists Simmons and James Glayat, bass guitarist and backing vocalist Stewart and drummer Kirkpatrick. "Operation" is a Circle Jerks cover. All six songs originally appeared on the band's sophomore extended play As Friends Rust, released by Good Life Recordings and Doghouse Records in 1999.

"Shame on You" was recorded on August 20, 1999, at Ieperfest in Ypres, Belgium, while As Friends Rust was on a five-week European and British tour in promotion of As Friends Rust. The tour was originally intended to be shared with fellow Gainesville, Florida hardcore band Hot Water Music, with which a split release was in talks, but due to disagreements over top-billing, the two bands ended up booking separate tours. Instead, As Friends Rust headlined its own European and British tour, playing a handful of cross-over shows with New Jersey hardcore band Ensign and California hardcore band Ignite. "Shame on You" was listed as "Untitled" on the artwork of the compilation since the band could not remember its title at the time of release. The recording was taken directly from the Good Life Recordings VHS release Good Life T.V., where it was listed as "A New One".

"Tuesday Clad" was recorded on June 26, 2000, at The Moose Lodge in Long Island, New York, while As Friends Rust was on a four-week American tour promoting As Friends Rust and The Fists of Time: An Anthology of Short Fiction and Non-Fiction (both on Doghouse). The entire tour was shared with Virginia hardcore band Strike Anywhere and spanned from May 29 to June 30, 2000, during which the bands played in nearly every state.

== Release, packaging and promotion ==
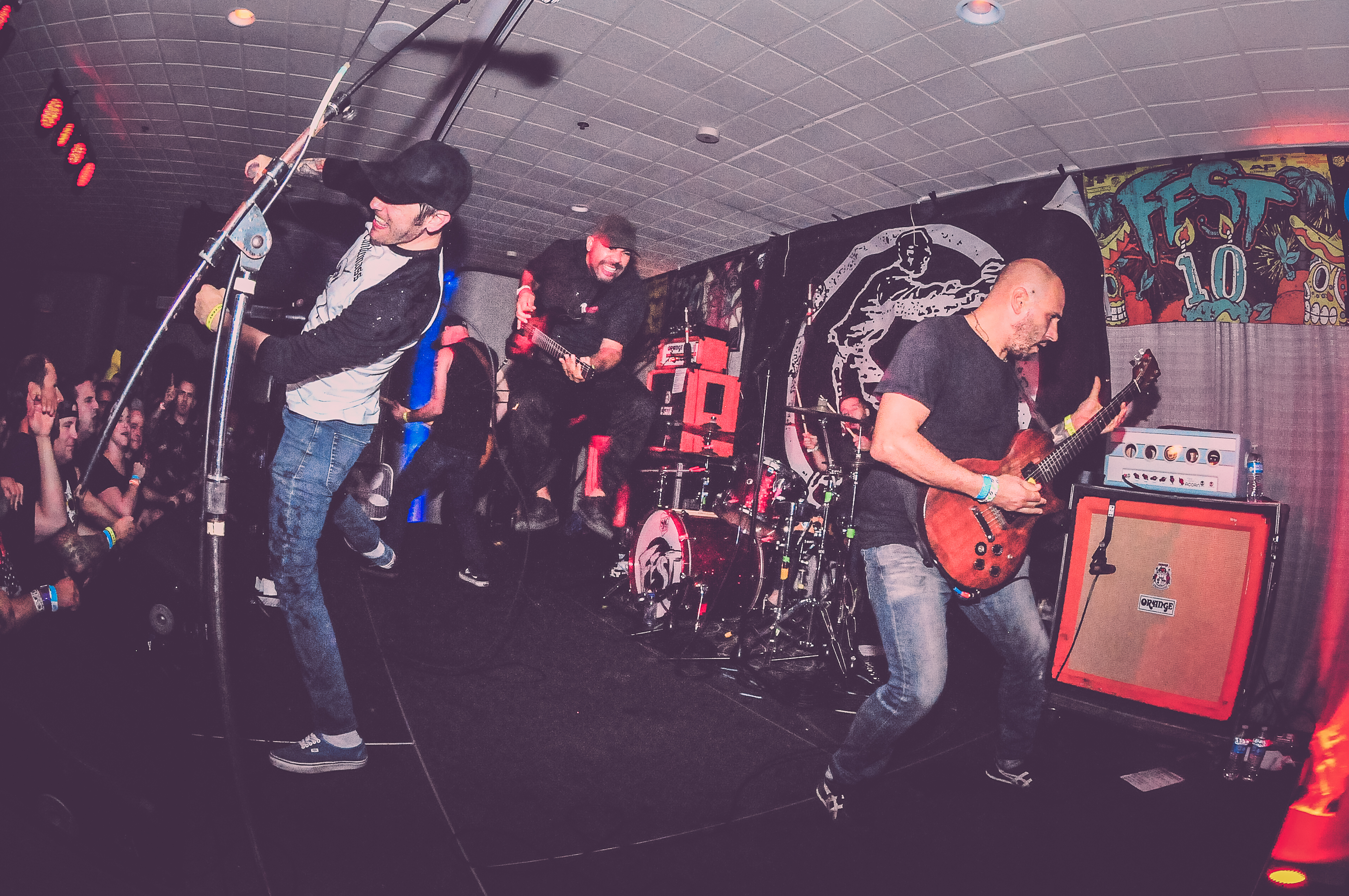
As Friends Rust performing at The Fest 14 in Gainesville, Florida on October 31, 2015, in promotion of The Porch Days: 1998 to 2000.

The artwork and layout for The Porch Days: 1998 to 2000 was designed by Moyal. The liner notes were written partly by Moyal and partly by Cindy Spence, who lived at The Porch House with most of the band members at the time. Nicholas Forneris, who had previously provided photographs for As Friends Rust and Won, contributed live pictures taken of the band during its 2008 reunion tour. Mattia Cabani also provided pictures of the band from 2000.

German record label Demons Run Amok Entertainment released The Porch Days: 1998 to 2000 on vinyl on May 22, 2015; the same day that it re-issued Moyal's other band Culture's Born of You album on vinyl. The vinyl came in a choice of solid black, clear, blue or green colors.

In promotion of the release, As Friends Rust played a series of concerts in 2015, starting with a show at Saint Vitus in Brooklyn, New York on April 30, 2015. The band also performed at the Groezrock festival in Meerhout, Belgium on May 2, 2015, and at The Wooly as part of The Fest 14 in Gainesville, Florida on October 31, 2015.

The band performed another set of shows in 2019, including one at The Kingsland in Brooklyn, New York on April 25, 2019, and two on the same day at Molotow in Hamburg, Germany on June 8, 2019, as part of the Booze Cruise Festival.

== Track listing ==
Credits are adapted from the compilation's liner notes.

Side one
No.	Title	Lyrics	Music	Length
1.	"Home Is Where the Heart Aches"	Moyal	Kirkpatrick; Simmons; Stewart; Tarpley	2:29
2.	"The First Song on the Tape You Make Her"	Moyal	Kirkpatrick; Simmons; Stewart; Bartsocas	2:57
3.	"Half Friend Town"	Moyal	Kirkpatrick; Simmons; Stewart; Glayat	2:17
4.	"Like Strings (Spell It with a K)"	Moyal	Kirkpatrick; Simmons; Stewart; Glayat	2:15
5.	"Fire on 8th and 3rd"	Moyal	Kirkpatrick; Simmons; Stewart; Glayat	0:11
Total length:				10:26

Side two
No.	Title	Lyrics	Music	Length
1.	"Coffee Black"	Moyal	Kirkpatrick; Simmons; Stewart; Glayat	3:18
2.	"Scapegoat Wets the Whistle"	Moyal	Kirkpatrick; Simmons; Stewart; Glayat	3:43
3.	"Operation"	Lehrer; Rogerson	Lehrer; Rogerson	1:40
4.	"Shame on You (Live in Ieper, Belgium, August 20th, 1999)"	Moyal	Kirkpatrick; Simmons; Stewart; Glayat	2:16
5.	"Tuesday Clad (Live in Long Island, NY, June 26th, 2000)"	Moyal	Kirkpatrick; Simmons; Stewart; Glayat	2:08
Total length:				12:45

== Personnel ==
Credits are adapted from the compilation's liner notes.

As Friends Rust

- Damien Moyal – lead vocals (all tracks)
- Joseph Simmons – guitar (all tracks) and backing vocals (track 1)
- Gordon Tarpley – guitar and backing vocals (track 1)
- James Glayat – guitar (tracks 2–10)
- Kaleb Stewart – bass guitar and backing vocals (all tracks)
- Timothy Kirkpatrick – drums (all tracks) and backing vocals (track 1)

Guest musicians

- Chuck Ragan – backing vocals on (track 1)
- George Rebelo – backing vocals on (track 1)
- Chris Wollard – backing vocals on (track 1)
- Rob McGregor – backing vocals (tracks 1–2)
- Keith Welsh – backing vocals (track 2)

Production

- Rob McGregor – recording engineer, mixer and producer at Goldentone Studios (tracks 1–8)
- As Friends Rust – co-mixer and co-producer (tracks 3–8)
- Damien Moyal – artwork, design and liner notes
- Cindy Spence – liner notes
- Nicholas Forneris – photography
- Mattia Cabani – photography

== Release history ==
Release formats for The Porch Days: 1998 to 2000
Region	Date	Label	Format	Catalog
Germany	May 22, 2015	Demons Run Amok Entertainment	12" Vinyl	DRA 099
