= As Friends Rust / Discount =

As Friend Rust / Discount
- As Friend Rust / Discount compact disc cover art.

EP by As Friends Rust and Discount
- Released: December 1998
- Recorded: April 1998 – October 1998
- Studio: Morrisound Recording, Tampa, Florida; Goldentone Studios, Gainesville, Florida
- Genre: Melodic hardcore; emotional hardcore; punk rock
- Length: 8:42
- Label: Good Life
- Producer: Steve Heritage; Rob McGregor

As Friends Rust chronology
The Fists of Time (1998)	As Friend Rust / Discount (1998)	As Friends Rust (1999)

Discount chronology
Love, Billy (1998)	As Friends Rust / Discount (1998)	Open Ended Aerial (1999)

Vinyl cover
- As Friend Rust / Discount vinyl cover art - As Friends Rust side.

Vinyl cover
- As Friend Rust / Discount vinyl cover art - Discount side.

As Friends Rust / Discount is a split extended play by Gainesville, Florida-based melodic hardcore band As Friends Rust and Vero Beach, Florida-based punk rock band Discount. It was released by Belgian record label Good Life Recordings in December 1998 on compact disc and 7" vinyl. In promotion of the release, As Friends Rust and Discount embarked on a six-week European and United Kingdom tour, from December 1998 to January 1999, accompanied by Swedish hardcore group Purusam. The European tour included a stop to play at the Good Life Winter Festival, in Kortrijk, Belgium.

Both Discount songs from the split, "Portrait of a Cigarette" and "History Is History", were recorded during the same session and feature vocalist Alison Mosshart, guitarist Ryan Seagrist, bass guitarist James Parker and drummer Bill Nesper. The two As Friends Rust songs, however, were recorded during separate sessions and feature a slight change in guitarists. Both songs feature lead vocalist Damien Moyal, guitarist Joseph Simmons, bass guitarist and backing vocalist Kaleb Stewart and drummer Timothy Kirkpatrick. "The First Song on the Tape You Make Her" also features guitarist James Glayat, while "Home Is Where the Heart Aches" also features guitarist Gordon Tarpley.

== Composition and recording ==
Before releasing a split extended play together, Gainesville, Florida-based melodic hardcore band As Friends Rust and Vero Beach, Florida-based punk rock band Discount had spent five weeks on the road together, touring the United States from June 11 to July 18, 1998. The tour also included shows with Minneapolis, Minnesota-based pop punk rock band Dillinger Four and dates to perform at such festivals as More Than Music in Columbus, Ohio, Tin Can Full of Dreams in Lawrence, Massachusetts and Wilkes-Barre Festival in Wilkes-Barre, Pennsylvania. It was As Friends Rust's first tour, promoting its debut extended play The Fists of Time, release by Belgian record label Good Life Recordings on July 13, 1998.

The two bands got along so well that they decided to plan another tour together and release a split extended play with the support of Good Life Recordings. Discount, which then featured vocalist Alison Mosshart, guitarist Ryan Seagrist, bass guitarist James Parker and drummer Bill Nesper, had already recorded two new songs, "Portrait of a Cigarette" and "History Is History", in April 1998 with producer Steve Heritage at Morrisound Recording in Tampa, Florida.

As Friends Rust, on the other hand, wanted to record its newest song for the release, "The First Song on the Tape You Make Her". The song had been composed between April and May 1998, with lead vocalist Damien Moyal, guitarists Joseph Simmons and Peter Bartsocas, bass guitarist and backing vocalist Kaleb Stewart and drummer Timothy Kirkpatrick. Another song written at the same time, "Some Sort of Radio", was never recorded. Both "The First Song on the Tape You Make Her" and "Some Sort of Radio" were played by As Friends Rust during the American tour with Discount. After replacing Bartsocas with James Glayat in October 1998, As Friends Rust entered to Goldentone Studios in Gainesville, Florida to record "The First Song on the Tape You Make Her" with producer Rob McGregor. McGregor, Stewart and Keith Welsh provided backing vocals on the recording.

Since Discount was contributing two songs to the release, As Friends Rust also included the previously released "Home Is Where the Heart Aches", taken from The Fists of Time. The song had been recorded at Goldentone Studios in late March 1998 with producer Rob McGregor and featured backing vocals from McGregor, all members of As Friends Rust, and three members of Hot Water Music; Chuck Ragan, George Rebelo and Chris Wollard. The song had also been recorded prior to Bartsocas joining the band, while Gordon Tarpley was still on guitar.

== Release, packaging and promotion ==
The split was released by Good Life Recordings on compact disc and 7" vinyl in early December 1998. As Friends Rust's song "Home Is Where the Heart Aches" was only available on the compact disc version; the vinyl only featuring three songs. The compact disc was limited to 1000 copies while the vinyl was limited to 1000 copies on black and 300 copies on blue.

The cover art and most of the booklet art for the split was designed by Moyal, with other illustrations provided by Mike Taylor. It was the first time that Moyal used what would become As Friends Rust's recognizable "guy with gun" logo; an illustration which he had found on a wall while walking through an alleyway in Chinatown, Boston, Massachusetts in early July 1998 (while on tour with Discount).

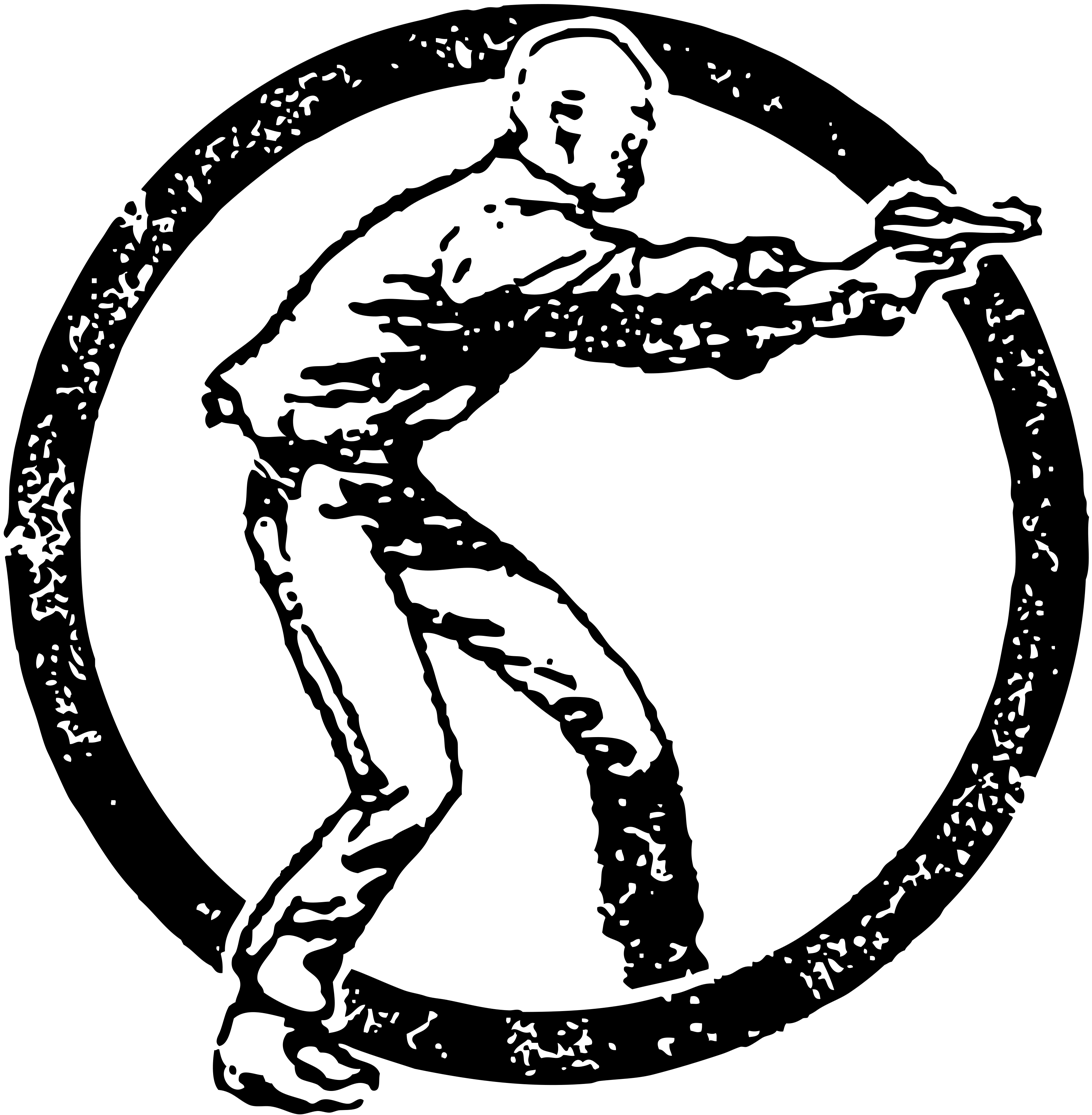
As Friends Rust's "guy with gun" logo, discovered and adapted by Moyal in 1998. The emblem was first used on the As Friends Rust / Discount split and has since appeared on the majority of the band's merchandise.

As Friends Rust and Discount embarked on a six-week European tour to promote the split release, from December 3, 1998, to January 14, 1999, accompanied by Swedish hardcore group Purusam. The European tour included a stop to play at the Good Life Winter Festival, in Kortrijk, Belgium.

The songs from this split later appeared on many other releases. Both Discount songs were used on the compilation album Singles #2, which compiled most of the band's split and Various Artists compilation songs, released by New American Dream in 2002. "Portrait of a Cigarette" also appeared on the Various Artists compilation The Got A Minute? Compilation, released by Microcosm Records in 1998, while "History Is History" appeared on the Various Artists compilations 403 Comp (Florida Fucking Hardcore), released by Schematics Records in 1998, and Budget Sampler, co-released by Good Life Recordings and Eulogy Recordings in 1999.

Both As Friends Rust song later appeared on The Fists of Times' reissue through Doghouse Records in June 2000; on the Eleven Songs compilation album released by Howling Bull Entertainment in October 1999 and Golf Records in October 2001; on the Greatest Hits? compilation album released by Cosmic Note in June 2014, D'Kolektif in December 2014 and Shield Recordings in April 2015; and on The Porch Days: 1998 to 2000 compilation album released by Demons Run Amok Entertainment in May 2015. "Home Is Where the Heart Aches" also appeared on an Initial Records Various Artists sampler in 1998.

== Critical reception ==
Professional ratings
Review scores
Source	Rating
Amboss	Positive
Broken Silence	Positive
Collective Zine	Positive
CORE Ground	Positive
Full Contact	Positive
Reflections	Positive
Slug and Lettuce	Positive
Unfit for Consumption	Positive

The split received overall positive critical acclaim upon release, though it had a smaller promotion from Good Life Recordings than As Friends Rust's debut The Fists of Time.

As Friends Rust's style was described by critics as melodic hardcore, emocore, melodic punk rock, new school hardcore, and melancholic hardcore, with comparisons drawn to fellow Gainesville, Florida band Hot Water Music. "The First Song on the Tape You Make Her" was proclaimed as a great love song, and was described as energetic, catchy, and with a melodic hook. The song was also described as more mature than the content from The Fists of Time.

Discount was described by critics as punk rock, power pop punk, emo, melodic and powerful punk rock, college rock, and upbeat and crunchy, with a comparison drawn to California band Tilt.

== Track listing ==
Credits are adapted from the album's liner notes.

No.	Title	Lyrics	Music	Artist	Length
1.	"The First Song on the Tape You Make Her"	Moyal	Kirkpatrick; Simmons; Stewart; Bartsocas	As Friends Rust	2:59
2.	"Portrait of a Cigarette"	Mosshart	Seagrist; Parker; Nesper	Discount	1:07
3.	"History Is History"	Mosshart	Seagrist; Parker; Nesper	Discount	2:05
4.	"Home Is Where the Heart Aches"	Moyal	Kirkpatrick; Simmons; Stewart; Tarpley	As Friends Rust	2:31
Total length:					8:42

== Personnel ==
Credits are adapted from the album's liner notes.

As Friends Rust

- Damien Moyal – lead vocals (tracks 1, 4)
- Joseph Simmons – guitar (tracks 1, 4) and backing vocals (track 4)
- James Glayat – guitar (track 1)
- Gordon Tarpley – guitar and backing vocals (track 4)
- Kaleb Stewart – bass guitar and backing vocals (tracks 1, 4)
- Timothy Kirkpatrick – drums (tracks 1, 4) and backing vocals (track 4)

Discount

- Alison Mosshart – lead vocals (tracks 2–3)
- Ryan Seagrist – guitar (tracks 2–3)
- James Parker – bass guitar (tracks 2–3)
- Bill Nesper – drums (tracks 2–3)

Guest musicians

- Keith Welsh – backing vocals (track 1)
- Rob McGregor – backing vocals (tracks 1, 4)
- Chuck Ragan – backing vocals (track 4)
- George Rebelo – backing vocals (track 4)
- Chris Wollard – backing vocals (track 4)

Production

- Rob McGregor – recording engineer, mixer and producer at Goldentone Studios (tracks 1, 4)
- Steve Heritage – recording engineer, mixer and producer at Morrisound Recording (tracks 2–3)
- Damien Moyal – artwork and design
- Mike Taylor – artwork

== Release history ==
Release formats for As Friends Rust / Discount
Region	Date	Label	Format	Catalog
Belgium	December 1998	Good Life Recordings	CD	GL035
Belgium	December 1998	Good Life Recordings	7" Vinyl	ED035
