= Kaleb Stewart =

American musician (1975–2021)

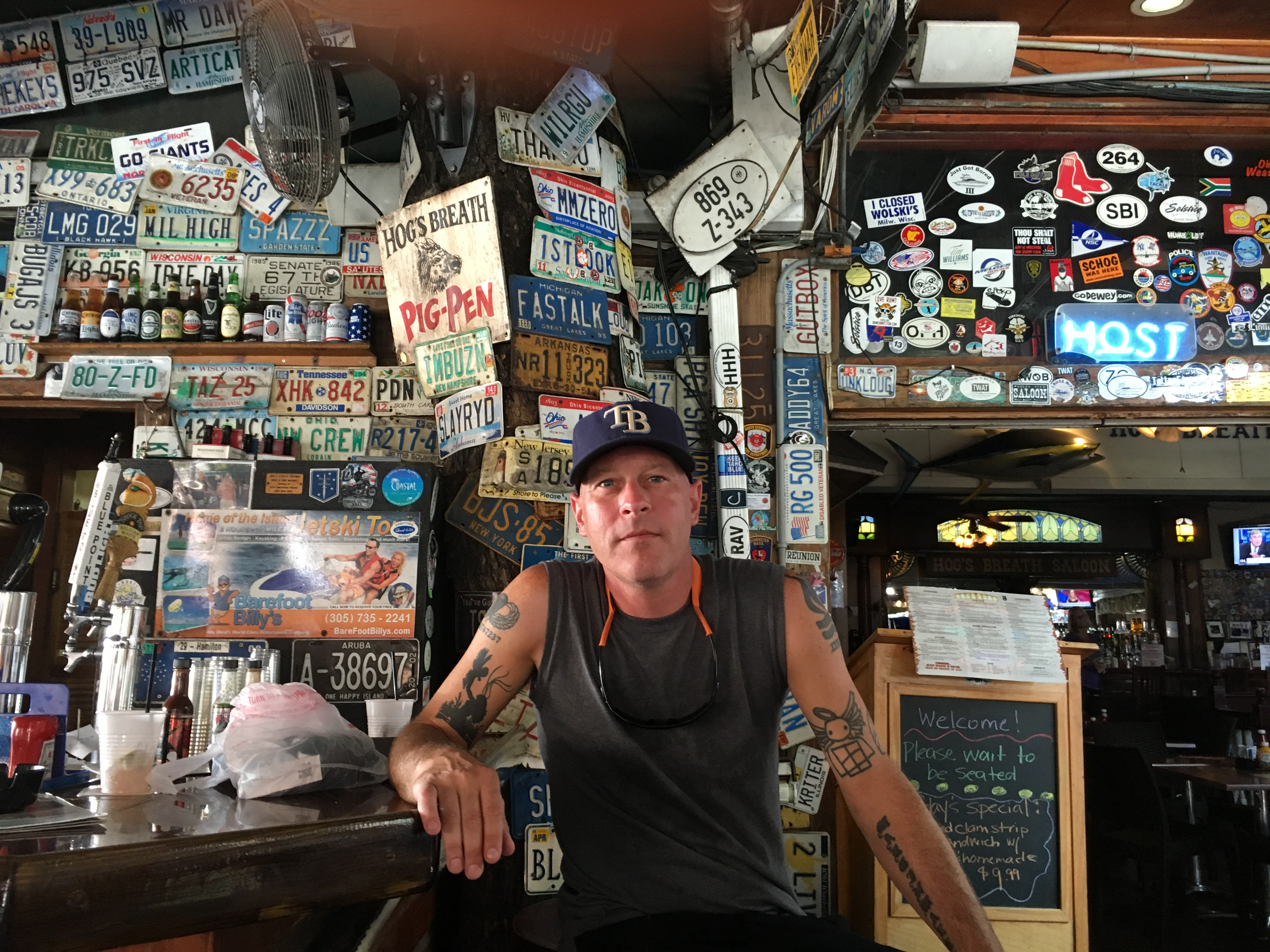
- Stewart at Hog's Breath Saloon in Key West, Florida, on August 26, 2016.

Background information
- Also known as: Kaleb Burner
- Born: Caleb Benjamin Stewart; June 9, 1975; Talkeetna, Alaska, U.S.
- Origin: Tampa, Florida U.S.
- Died: March 25, 2021 (aged 45) Gainesville, Florida, U.S.
- Genres: Hardcore punk; melodic hardcore; punk rock; post-hardcore
- Occupations: Singer; musician; lyricist; songwriter
- Instruments: Vocals; guitar; bass guitar
- Years active: 1993–2021
- Labels: Aaahh!!! Real; Cosmic Note; Cro(w)s and Pawns; Demons Run Amok; Doghouse; Howling Bull; Initial; Genet; Golf; Good Life; No Idea; Back From the Dead; Shield; Sounds of Subterrania
- Formerly of: As Friends Rust; Bread Riot; Bridgeburne R; Cro(w)s; Goodnight at the End of the Tunnel; Grey Goose; Sissy; Southpaw; The Sarx; The Sheryl Cro(w) Mags
- Spouse: Lila Marie Schaller (m. 2005)
- Education: University of Florida
- Children: 1

Kaleb Stewart (June 9, 1975 – March 25, 2021) was an American musician, vocalist, songwriter and former skateboarder. Originally from Talkeetna, Alaska, he moved around in his childhood before settling in Tampa, Florida as a teenager, and later made his home in Gainesville, Florida. While in Gainesville, he notably played bass guitar and provided backing vocals in the melodic hardcore band As Friends Rust from 1998 to 2000, and in the hardcore punk band Bridgeburne R from 1999 to 2000 (both with lead vocalist Damien Moyal). Stewart took part of As Friends Rust's reunion in 2008, and remained with the band until 2019.

Prior to joining As Friends Rust, Stewart had a short-lived professional skateboarding career, sang in the post-punk band The Sarx and the punk rock band Southpaw (both based in Tampa), and played bass guitar in the Gainesville punk rock band Sissy. Following his time in As Friends Rust, he played guitar and provided backing vocals in the punk rock band The Sheryl Cro(w) Mags (later renamed Cro(w)s), with his best friend Chris Wollard (of Hot Water Music), which was sporadically active from 2000 to 2004, and sang in the acoustic folk duo Goodnight at the End of the Tunnel with Moyal in 2005.

He began performing solo material under his own name in 2000, but by November 2001, his project had taken up the moniker Grey Goose. After recruiting several band members, including his brother Levi Stewart, Grey Goose evolved into a proper post-hardcore band. Following Grey Goose's hiatus in 2005, Stewart returned to playing solo material under the short-lived project Bread Riot.

Stewart resumed his solo career in 2015, altering between bookings under his own name and as Grey Goose. By mid-2017, he had abandoned the Grey Goose moniker and steadily performed under his own name. He prolifically recorded a series of solo albums and EPs over the next three years and promoted the releases with five European tours before dying in 2021.

== Background ==
=== Early life and school ===
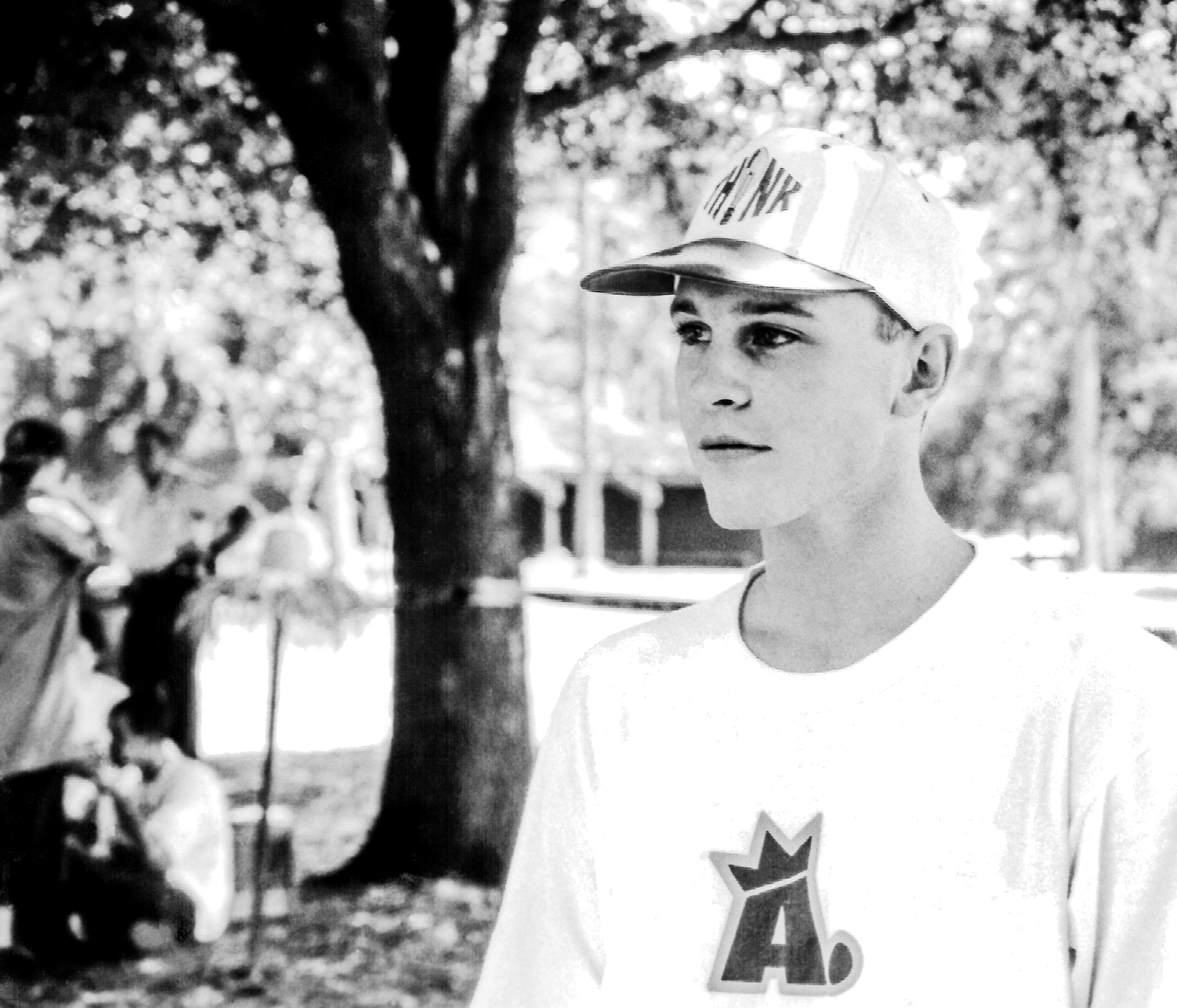
Stewart at Shanti Festival at the Lowry Park Bandshell in Tampa, Florida on May 15, 1993, shortly before graduating from Gaither High School.

Kaleb Stewart was born Caleb Benjamin Stewart in Talkeetna, Alaska on June 9, 1975, to Michael Leon Stewart and Mary E. (née Ferguson). He had five siblings: older brothers Justin and Levi, younger brother Seth, and younger sisters Lydia and Essie. He grew up in a religious environment, with his parents and grandparents working as missionaries. As such, his family moved to various locations when he was a child, first to Hillsdale, Michigan in 1982, then to Cochabamba, Bolivia in 1990, and finally to Tampa, Florida in 1992.

Stewart was introduced to music by his maternal grandparents, Milton McNeil Ferguson and Elizabeth Anne Elliott, who lived in Hillsdale, Michigan and brought him to country gospel music concerts at their local religious venue, The Gospel Barn. Stewart later noted the Bill Gaither Trio as the first band he remembered seeing live. His father also listened to blues music and introduced him to Lead Belly; Stewart would later name his solo project Grey Goose, after the folk song made famous by Lead Belly. While living in Hillsdale, Stewart and his siblings attended Lenawee Christian School in Adrian, Michigan.

In 1990, his family relocated to Cochabamba, Bolivia, as part of their missionary work, before returning to the United States and settling in Tampa, Florida in the fall of 1992. Already in his senior year, Stewart attended Gaither High School in Tampa, graduating with the class of 1993. While in high school, Stewart began spelling his first name with a "K" instead of a "C", as "Kaleb".

=== Skateboarding and first bands (1993–1997) ===
Stewart and his younger brother Seth began skateboarding during high school and quickly became part of the local Tampa, Florida skateboarding scene after moving there in 1992. In early 1994, Stewart was noticed by a representative of New Deal Skateboards and received a sponsorship. He moved to Los Angeles, California (where his older brother Justin was based) and joined the company's professional skateboarding team, competing in local and international competitions. Stewart traveled to the United Kingdom and Europe in July and August 1994, to compete in international skateboarding competitions, including the 13th edition of the Münster Monster Mastership World Cup 94 in Münster, Germany. By the end of 1994, after suffering a knee injury and being disenchanted with the professional skateboarding society, Stewart returned to Tampa.

Back in Florida, Stewart formed his first band, taking up lead vocals in the Morrissey-influenced post-punk band The Sarx. In a retrospective interview, Stewart singled out a Nirvana concert from November 28, 1993, at the Lakeland Civic Center, in Lakeland, Florida, as the best show he attended as a teenager and an influence on his starting to write music. In 1996, Stewart formed a new punk rock band, Southpaw, which included drummer Greg Drudy, bass guitarist Paul Dryer, and guitarist Chris von Spiegelfeld (Stewart was again lead vocalist).

=== Moving to Gainesville and touring with Hot Water Music (1997–1999) ===
Stewart moved to Gainesville, Florida in 1997 to be closer to his girlfriend, whom he had been dating since high school. During this period, Stewart dedicated much time to his guitar and recording original material on a TASCAM four-track cassette recorder, often collaborating with friends. In June 1997, he joined established punk rock band Sissy (formerly Tiger) as its new bass guitarist, replacing Jason Szrom. The band then also included vocalist Jeff Kissinger, drummer (and Stewart's roommate) Garry Gillooly, and guitarists Dave Rohm and Brian Wysolmierski.

In November 1997, Stewart became Gainesville-based melodic hardcore band Hot Water Music's roadie and road manager, starting with a month-long tour of the East Coast and Midwest United States shared with Elliott and Beta Minus Mechanic. He continued to tour with Hot Water Music and related side-projects for the next several years, whenever As Friends Rust's schedule allowed it. This included a two-week tour shared by The Blacktop Cadence and Jejune up the East Coast and Midwest United States in March 1998, and a nation-wide, two-month tour during which Hot Water Music was billed with Sick of It All, AFI, and Indecision from October 6 to November 21, 1999.

=== As Friends Rust (1998–2000) ===
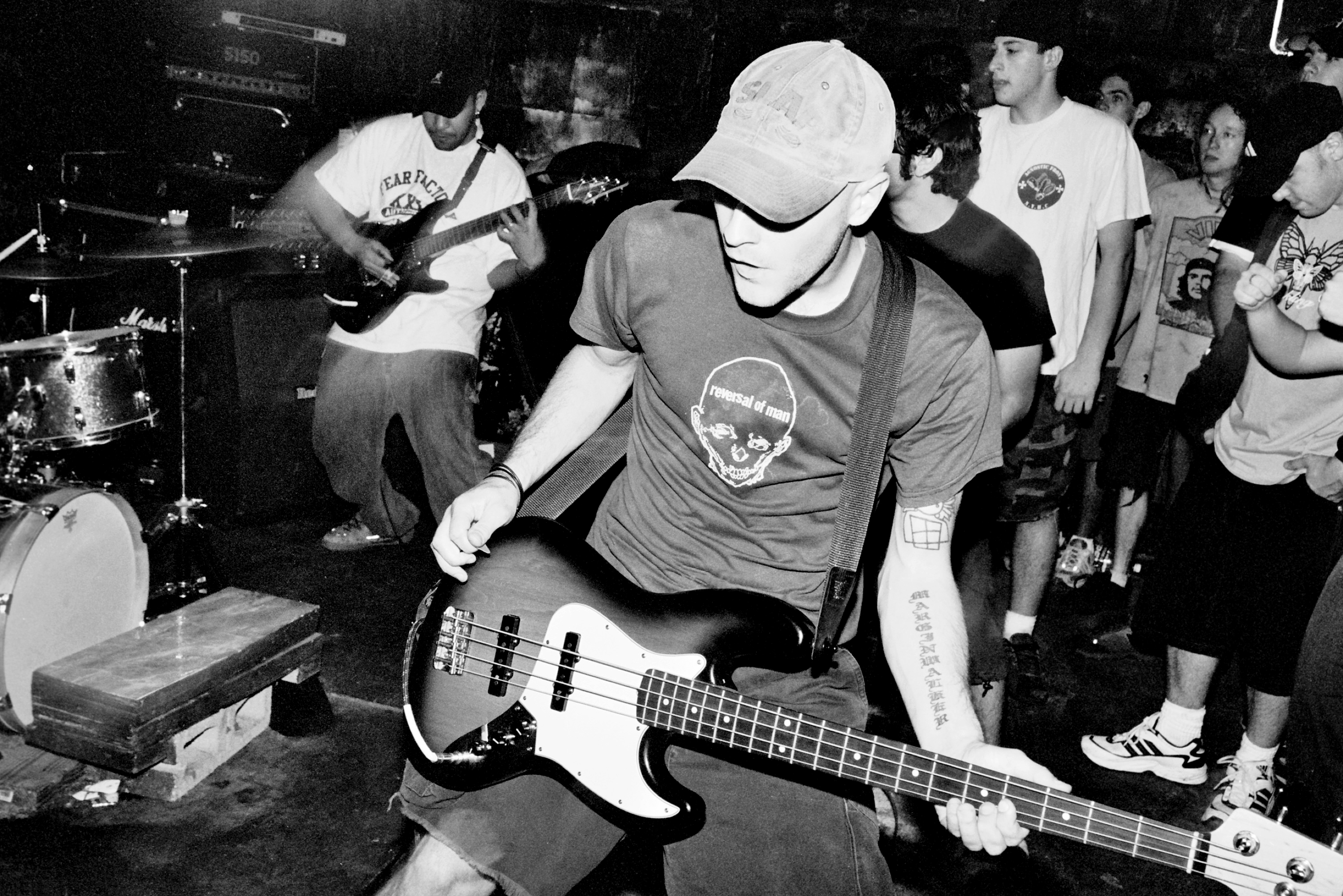
Stewart (front) performing with As Friends Rust at 33 Tyler Street in Buffalo, New York on June 29, 2000.

Stewart joined As Friends Rust as its bass guitarist and backing vocalist in March 1998, when lead vocalist Damien Moyal reformed the band with a new line-up in Gainesville, Florida (the band had previously existed from 1996 to 1997 and was originally based in Davie, Florida). Coincidentally, Hot Water Music's bass guitarist Jason Black had first been approached for the position in June 1997, and though he showed interest, he never got around to practicing with the band. Stewart had first met Moyal while attending a Shai Hulud concert on February 24, 1996, at Joe Mocha's Coffee House at The Refuge in Saint Petersburg, Florida, immediately becoming a fan of the vocalist's work and purchasing Shai Hulud's demo tape. The two later bumped into each other in 1997 at Leonardo's Pizza By the Slice (where Stewart was working) in Gainesville, at which time Stewart asked Moyal to keep him in mind if he ever needed a guitarist or bass guitarist for his bands. Moyal came to see Stewart perform at a Sissy concert at The University Club in Gainesville in March 1998, and afterwards formally asked him to join the reforming As Friends Rust. Stewart was at that time the only member of As Friends Rust not simultaneously playing in the metallic hardcore band Culture; the other members included drummer Timothy Kirkpatrick, and guitarists Gordon Tarpley and Joseph Simmons.

With its new line-up, As Friends Rust recorded the song "Home Is Where the Heart Aches" at Goldentone Studios in Gainesville, Florida in late March 1998 with producer Rob McGregor. Stewart provided backing vocals on the recording and invited his friends from Hot Water Music, Chris Wollard, Chuck Ragan and George Rebelo, to do the same. "Home Is Where the Heart Aches" was combined with material from the band's 1996 demo recording session to make up As Friends Rust's debut extended play, The Fists of Time, released by Belgian record label Good Life Recordings on compact disc and 10-inch vinyl on July 13, 1998. After replacing Tarpley with Peter Bartsocas, the band embarked on a five-week tour of the United States to promote The Fists of Time, spanning from June–July 1998, accompanied by Discount and Dillinger Four. The tour included stops to perform at such festivals as More Than Music in Columbus, Ohio, Tin Can Full of Dreams in Lawrence, Massachusetts and Wilkes-Barre Festival in Wilkes-Barre, Pennsylvania.

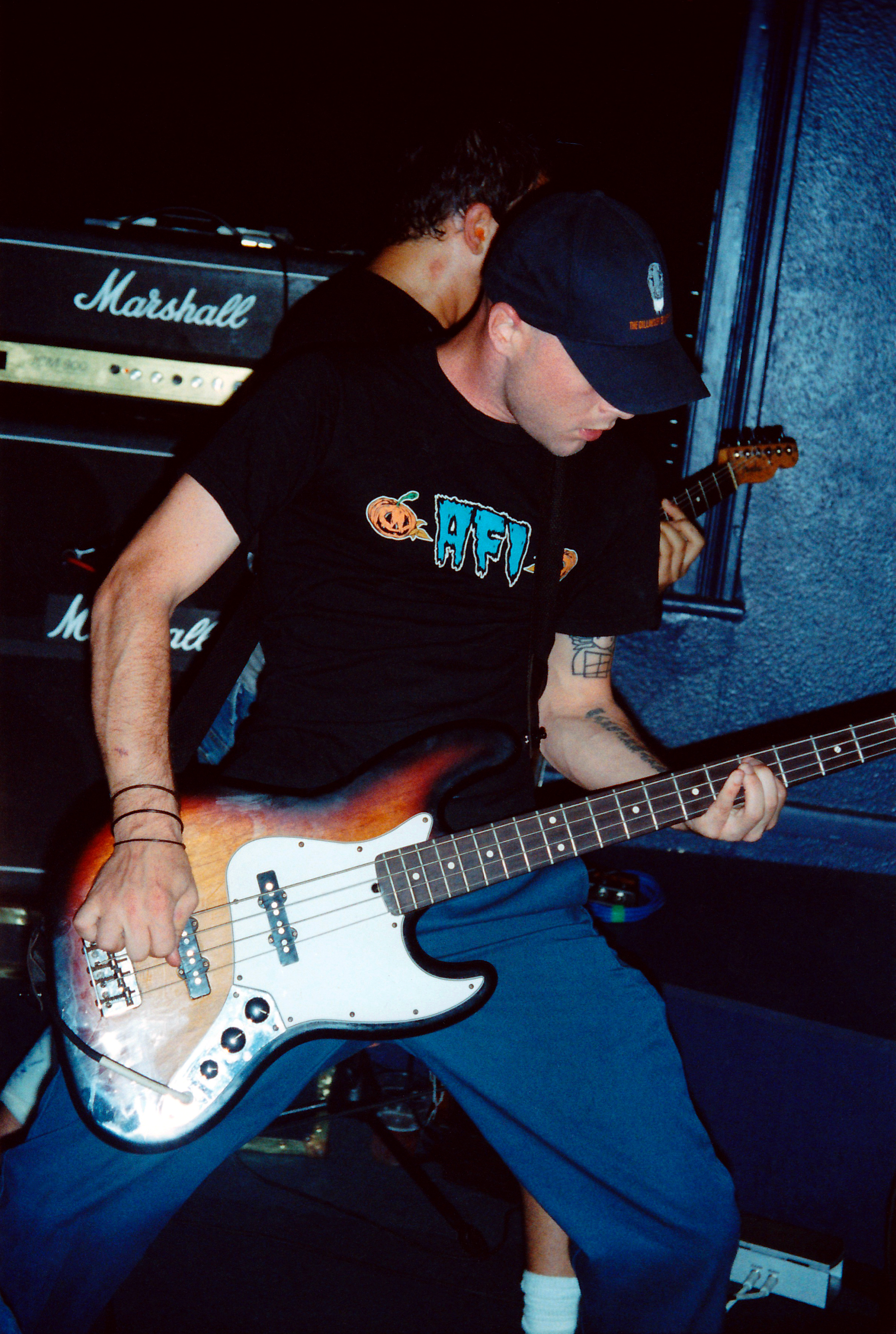
Stewart (front) performing with As Friends Rust at The Star and Garter in Manchester, England on August 24, 2000.

After replacing Bartsocas with James Glayat in October 1998, As Friends Rust returned to Goldentone Studios to record "The First Song on the Tape You Make Her" with McGregor. Stewart, McGregor and Keith Welsh provided backing vocals on the recording. The song, which had been partly written with Bartsocas, appeared on a split CD and 7-inch vinyl with Discount, released by Good Life Recordings in December 1998. As Friends Rust and Discount then embarked on a second tour together, accompanied by Swedish band Purusam, this time travelling around Europe and the United Kingdom from December 1998 to January 1999.

In late 1998, As Friends Rust was signed to a three-record deal by American record label Doghouse Records, and in May 1999 returned to Goldentone Studios to record six songs with McGregor. The new material included the songs "Half Friend Town", "Like Strings (Spell It with a K)", "Fire on 8th and 3rd", "Coffee Black", "Scapegoat Wets the Whistle" and a cover of Circle Jerks' "Operation", all with backing vocals provided by Stewart. The songs were released on a self-titled compact disc and 8" vinyl by Doghouse Records on September 17, 1999, and on compact disc and double 7-inch vinyl by Good Life Recordings.

As Friends Rust toured the East Coast of the United States during three weeks in June 1999, accompanied by acoustic musician Keith Welsh. The tour included stops to play the Wilkes-Barre Summer Music Festival in Kingston, Pennsylvania and Syracuse Hell Fest in Syracuse, New York. The band quickly followed up with a five-week European and British tour spanning July–August 1999, playing at such festivals as Good Life Midsummer Hardcore Festival in Kuurne, Belgium, Festival Hardcore in Sant Feliu De Guíxols, Spain and Ieper Hardcore Festival in Ypres, Belgium. The European and British tour was originally intended to be shared with Hot Water Music, but due to disagreements over top-billing, the two bands ended up booking separate itineraries; As Friends Rust instead headlined its own tour, playing a handful of cross-over shows with Ensign and Ignite.

On October 5, 1999, Japanese record label Howling Bull Entertainment released the compact disc compilation Eleven Songs, which included a selection of the band's recorded material from 1996 to 1999. This compilation would later be re-issued by British record label Golf Records on October 22, 2001. In December 1999, the band played GainesvilleFest in Gainesville, Florida. During the first half of 2000, As Friends Rust went on mini tours with Fast Times and Good Clean Fun, and also played The Copper Sun Indie Records Winter Festival in Wilkes-Barre, Pennsylvania, Detroit Festival in Detroit, Michigan and Krazy Fest 3 in Louisville, Kentucky.

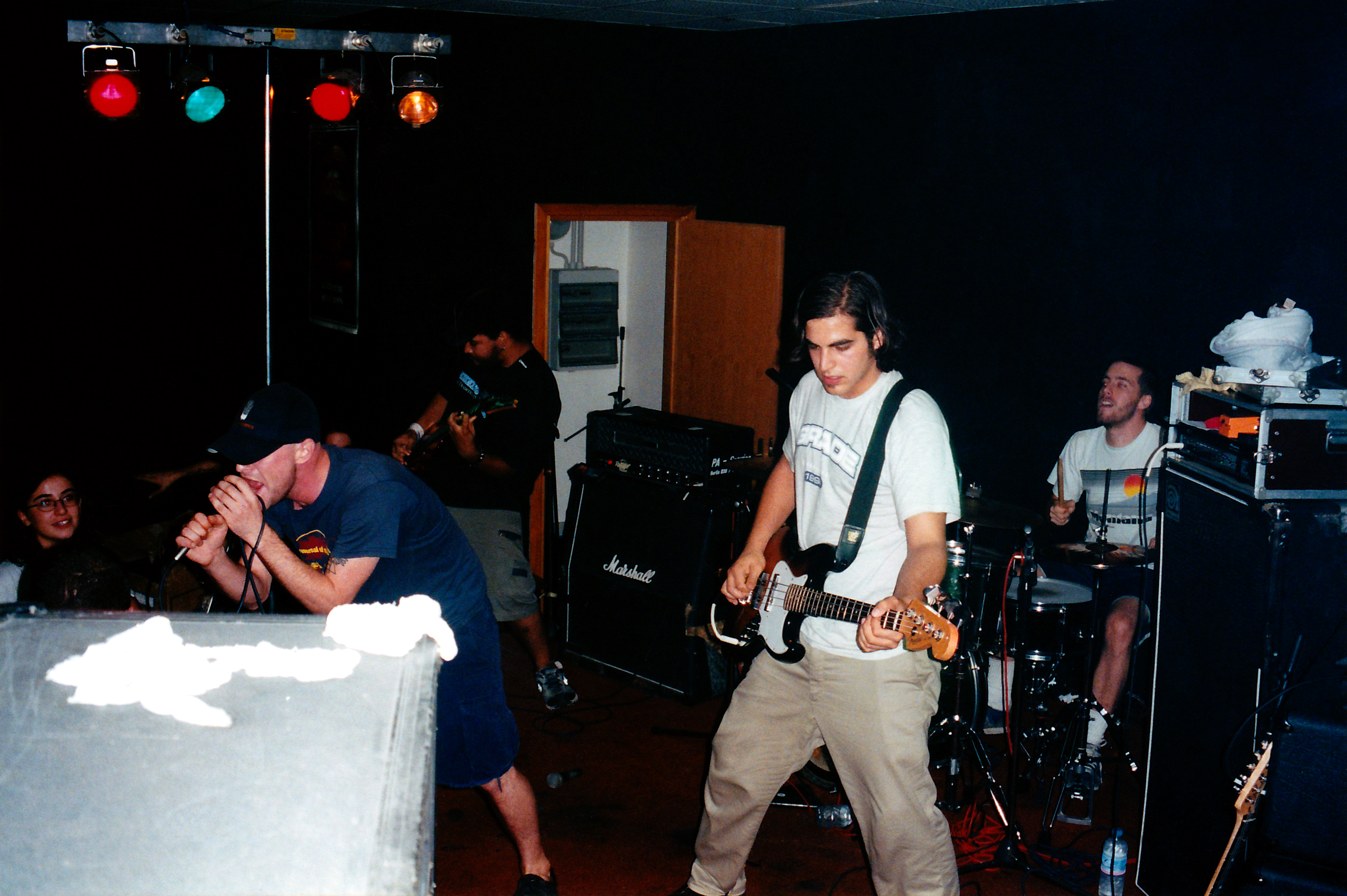
As Friends Rust performing at Plan 9 in Limena, Italy on September 16, 2000. One of the few shows when Stewart took up lead vocals while Damien Moyal was sick. From left to right: Stewart, Joseph Simmons, Peter Bartsocas and Timothy Kirkpatrick.

On June 22, 2000, Doghouse Records re-issued The Fists of Time: An Anthology of Short Fiction and Non-Fiction. As Friends Rust immediately embarked on a four-week tour to promote the release, playing shows across the entire United States with Strike Anywhere. The tour included stops to play such festivals as Mixed Messages in Minneapolis, Minnesota, Pheer Festival in College Park, Maryland and Hellfest 2K in Auburn, New York (the last of which As Friends Rust did not play due to a last-minute change in venue).

In July 2000, Good Life Recordings invited As Friends Rust back to Europe for a week's worth of shows in Belgium and the Netherlands, including a performance at Dour Festival in Dour, Belgium and another at Metropolis Festival in Rotterdam, Netherlands. In mid-August 2000, the band returned to Europe and the United Kingdom for a full five-week tour, which included a handful of cross-over shows with Grade, Ensign and Garrison. This European and British tour also included stops to play the Ieper Hardcore Festival in Ypres, Belgium and TurboPunk Festival, in Poznań, Poland.

Prior to leaving for the European and British tour, Glayat and Kirkpatrick announced their desire to leave the band upon returning home. However, tensions during the tour ultimately caused a much bigger change in membership. Ex-guitarist Bartsocas was visiting Europe at the same time and decided to travel with the band. When Glayat injured his leg during the first week of the tour and flew home early, Bartsocas filled the vacant guitarist position. Several shows later, Moyal lost his voice, leading Stewart to switch from bass guitar to lead vocals, and Bartsocas temporarily filling in as bass guitarist. Moyal and Simmons called ex-Culture bass guitarist Christopher "Floyd" Beckham (Glayat's at-the-time roommate) from Europe, asking him to join As Friends Rust as its new guitarist upon returning home, much to Stewart's dismay, leading the latter to quit the band.

=== Bridgeburner R (1999–2000) ===
In the summer of 1999, Stewart teamed up with As Friends Rust lead vocalist Damien Moyal, Radon drummer Bill Clower, and ex-Speak 714 guitarist Eryc Simmerer, to form the hardcore punk band Bridgeburne R. The band recorded eight songs at Goldentone Studios with Rob McGregor in September 1999: "T.V. Gone Awry", "Girls Up Front!", "OK, One Positive Song, But That's It.", For the Kidding", "Hardcore Means I'm Not Allowed to Smile", "Myth of Terrorism", "Holocaust Revisionism" and "We Mean Business". The material would only be released an entire year later by Belgian record label Genet Records, on the band's sole album, a compact disc titled What Do You Know About Bridgeburne R? 1986-1992 The Singles Collection.

To market the release, the band took on a fictional persona as a defunct hardcore punk act from Texas, once active from 1986 to 1993 (according to the album liner notes), or 1984 to 1994 (according to the press release). The liner notes proclaimed the release as a collection of songs lifted from its out-of-print records from the late 1980s and early 1990s, including split 7-inch vinyls with Born Against and Nausea. The press release also proclaimed that Bridgeburne R had headlined tours with such supporting acts as Black Flag, Bad Religion, Negative Approach, Biohazard and Nuclear Assault between 1985 and 1994.

To support the album, Bridgeburne R embarked on a real three-week European tour, which spanned from September to October 2000, accompanied by American hardcore band Fall Silent. Stewart, however, quit the band a week before the tour (at the same time as he quit As Friends Rust); Mykel Tre Beaton replaced him as bass guitarist for the tour.

=== The Sheryl Cro(w) Mags and Cro(w)s (2000–2004) ===
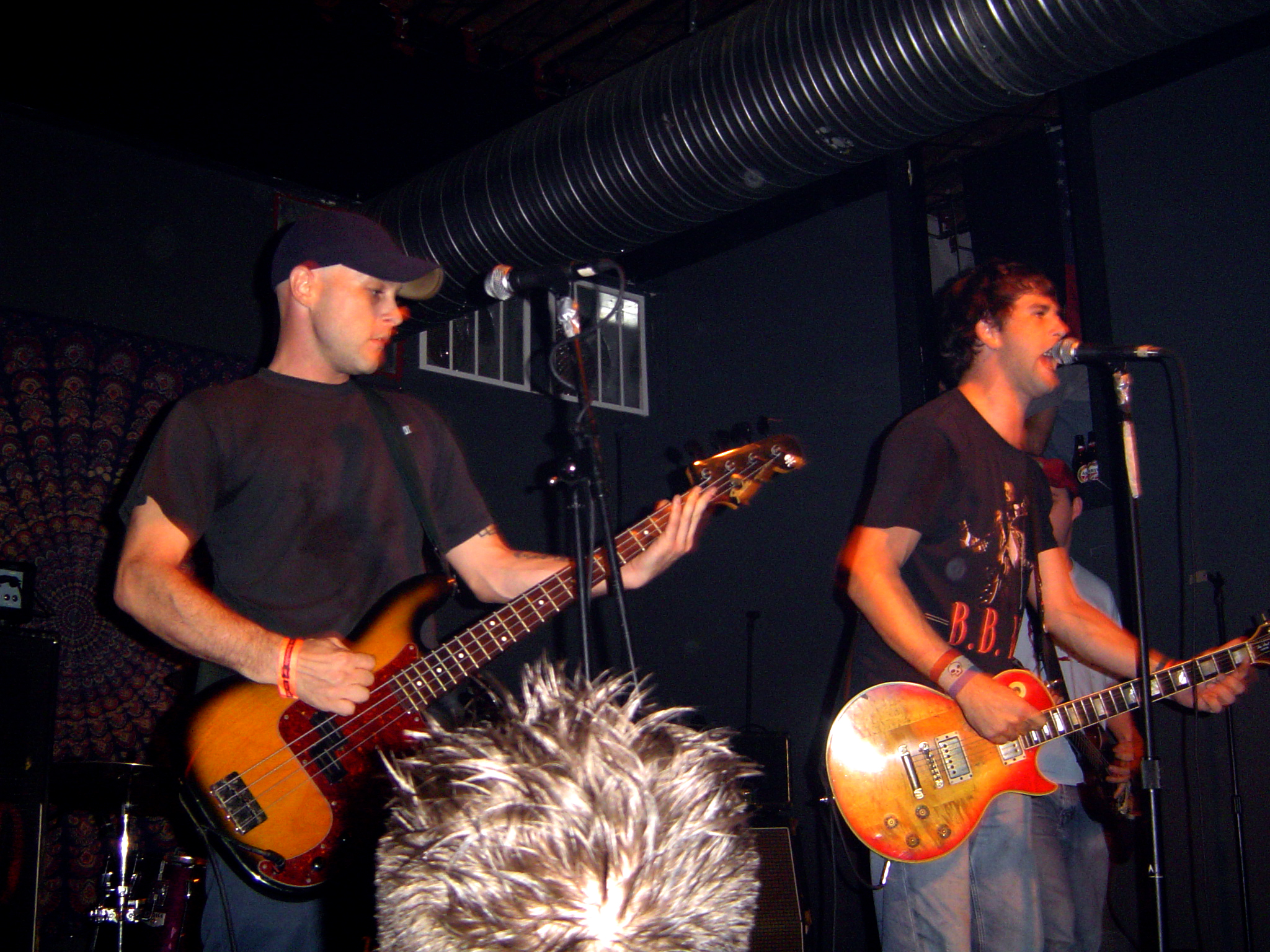
Cro(w)s performing at Cumberland's in Charleston, South Carolina on August 22, 2004. From left to right: Stewart, Chris Wollard and Rob McGregor.

After leaving As Friends Rust and Bridgeburne R, Stewart joined his best friend, and Hot Water Music vocalist and guitarist Chris Wollard in the punk rock band The Sheryl Cro(w) Mags (later renamed Cro(w)s). The band, which also included drummer Bill Clower and bass guitarist Jamie Spall, released the 7-inch single #1 Hit / Watch for Repetition (on which Stewart appeared as a guest, providing backing vocals) in 2000 through American record labels No Idea Records and Cro(w)s and Pawns Records.

With Stewart joining as a permanent member as guitarist and backing vocalist, The Sheryl Cro(w) Mags embarked on a three-week tour of the United States' East Coast and Midwest, spanning from May 4–25, 2001, and accompanied by another Hot Water Music side-project, Unitas. Spall was then replaced by James Ross.

The Sheryl Cro(w) Mags returned to Goldentone Studios to record twelve songs with McGregor for its debut full-length album Durty Bunny. The songs included "There's Nothing Wrong", "Waiting for the Bleeding", "Red on the Floor", "Everyday Revisited", "Durty Bunny", "Live and Let Go", "You'll Learn to Accept It", "Wrong Again", "T.O.W.", "Precious Exhibit 'A'" and a re-recording of "#1 Hit" and a cover of The Lemonheads' "Rick James Style". The band, however, modified its name to Cro(w)s shortly before the album's release. Durty Bunny was released on compact disc on September 25, 2002, through No Idea Records and Cro(w)s and Pawns Records, and on vinyl on September 8, 2003, through German record label Sounds of Subterrania.

Outside of the May 2001 tour, the band only managed to play live sporadically during its 2000–2004 span, as Wollard's schedule was often taken up by Hot Water Music. In mid-2004, Stewart switched to playing bass guitar in order to welcome guitarist McGregor, with whom the band planned to record an extended play, but it was never completed. Cro(w)s wound up playing its last few shows in mid-August 2004, though it was not a planned farewell.

=== Grey Goose (2000–2005) ===
Stewart began performing solo shows under his own name in early 2001, but by November 2001, he had named the project Grey Goose. The band was named after the folk song "Grey Goose", notably performed by blues musician Lead Belly. Grey Goose expanded when Stewart recruited other band members, including his brother Levi Stewart on drums, and bass guitarist James Parker (formerly of Discount), turning it into a full melodic punk rock/post-hardcore band.

Grey Goose recorded a four-song demo in early 2002, on the strength of which the band was signed to Belgian record label Good Life Recordings. Parker was then replaced by Sean Atwater and Dorian Hargrove joined as second guitarist. With this line-up, Grey Goose recorded the five-song extended play, Love, co-produced by Damien Moyal and James Paul Wisner at Wisner Productions in Davie, Florida in the fall of 2002. Love was scheduled for release through Good Life Recordings, but the company opted not to release it. It was eventually offered on the band's Bandcamp page for download in May 2014. On December 21, 2002, Grey Goose played the Gainesvillefest 2K2 festival.

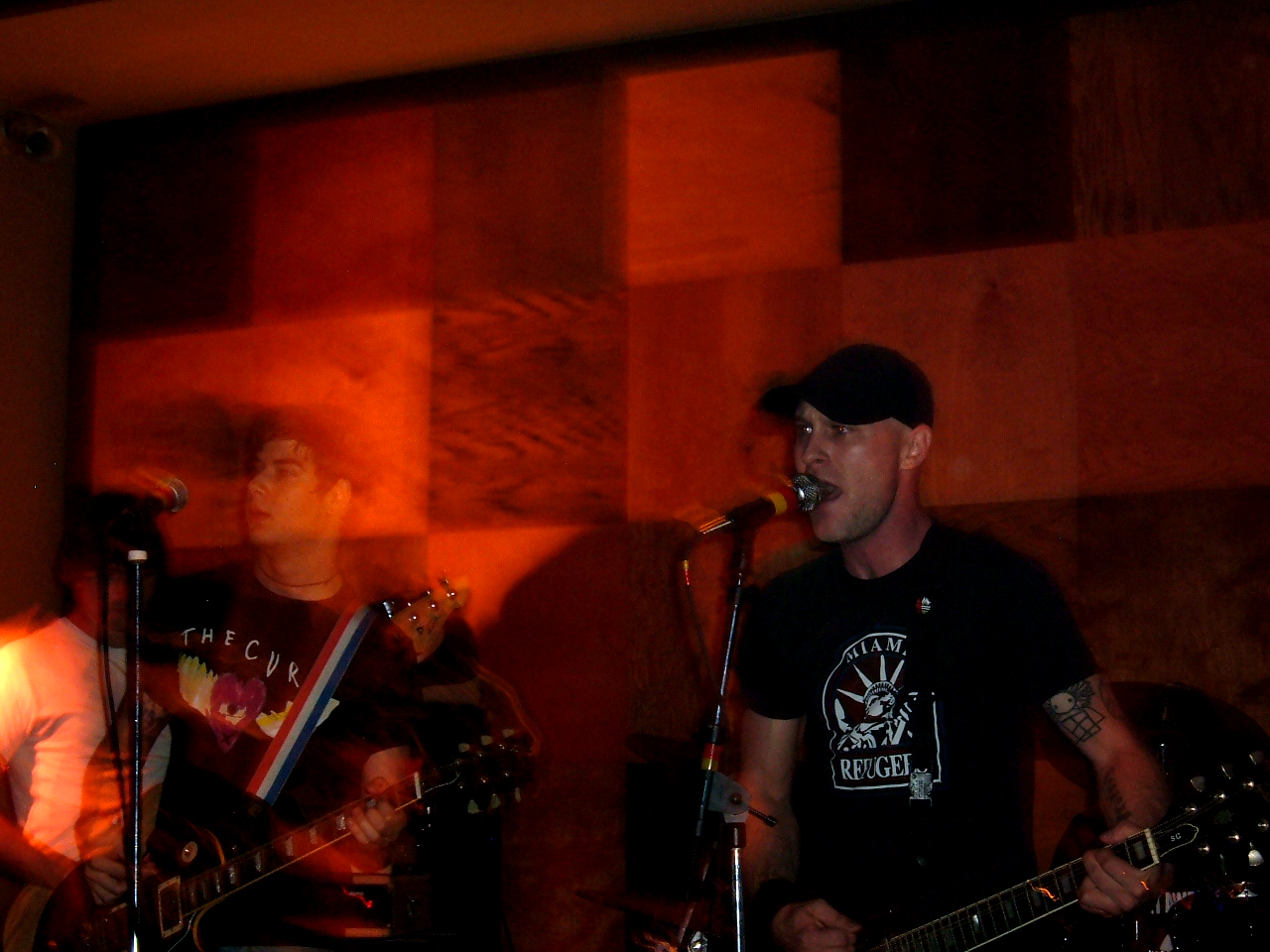
Grey Goose performing at The Atlantic in Gainesville, Florida on May 20, 2005. From left to right: Sean Atwater, Johnny Smithmeyer and Stewart.

In 2003, Levi Stewart was replaced by drummer Bill Clower (formerly of Radon and Bridgeburne R, and simultaneously playing in Cro(w)s), and the band recorded a second four-song demo with Rob McGregor at Goldentone Studios in Gainesville, Florida. On October 17, 2003, Grey Goose played at the second edition of The Fest festival in Gainesville, Florida.

In December 2003, Grey Goose announced that it had been picked up by German record label Sounds of Subterrania, which had previously signed Cro(w)s and was about to release Durty Bunny on vinyl. Grey Goose immediately began tracking its debut full-length album, 'Til the Medicine Takes, during three weeks in February–March 2004 at Goldentone Studios, co-produced by McGregor and Chris Wollard. McGregor contributed harmonica and guitar to the songs "Band of the Future" and "Xiola", while Wollard played lead guitar on the song "Elimination Process". By April 2004, the album was completed and in May 2004, the band released a music video for the song "I Know Where Crazy Lives". On October 29, 2004, Grey Goose played at the third edition of The Fest festival in Gainesville, Florida.

'Til the Medicine Takes was released on compact disc and vinyl in late 2004 by Sounds of Subterrania, following which Hargrove was replaced by guitarist Johnny Smithmeyer. American and European tours were planned in promotion of the release for early 2005, but they were cancelled when Clower was held in custody and ultimately forbidden from travelling outside Florida. Drummer Shane Haven occasionally filled in as drummer for out of state shows, but Clower continued to play with the band until May 2005.

=== Goodnight at the End of the Tunnel and Bread Riot (2005) ===
In January 2005, Stewart and Damien Moyal formed an acoustic folk duo named Goodnight at the End of the Tunnel, which recorded the single "Lately It's the Cross". The song featured Stewart on lead vocals and acoustic guitar and Moyal on backing vocals, electric guitar and percussion; the song was also recorded and produced by Moyal.

With Grey Goose on hiatus, Stewart planned to resume performing solo material under the name Bread Riot, and recorded a two-song acoustic demo in late May 2005. The two songs recorded included "Be Wilderness" and "Cinco de Mayo", and featured Stewart on lead vocals, electric and acoustic guitars and electric bass guitar. The songs were recorded and produced by Moyal, who also contributed backing vocals, synths and drum programming. In 2007, Chris Wollard announced that he and Stewart were planning a split 7-inch vinyl of their solo material.

=== As Friends Rust reunion (2008–2019) ===
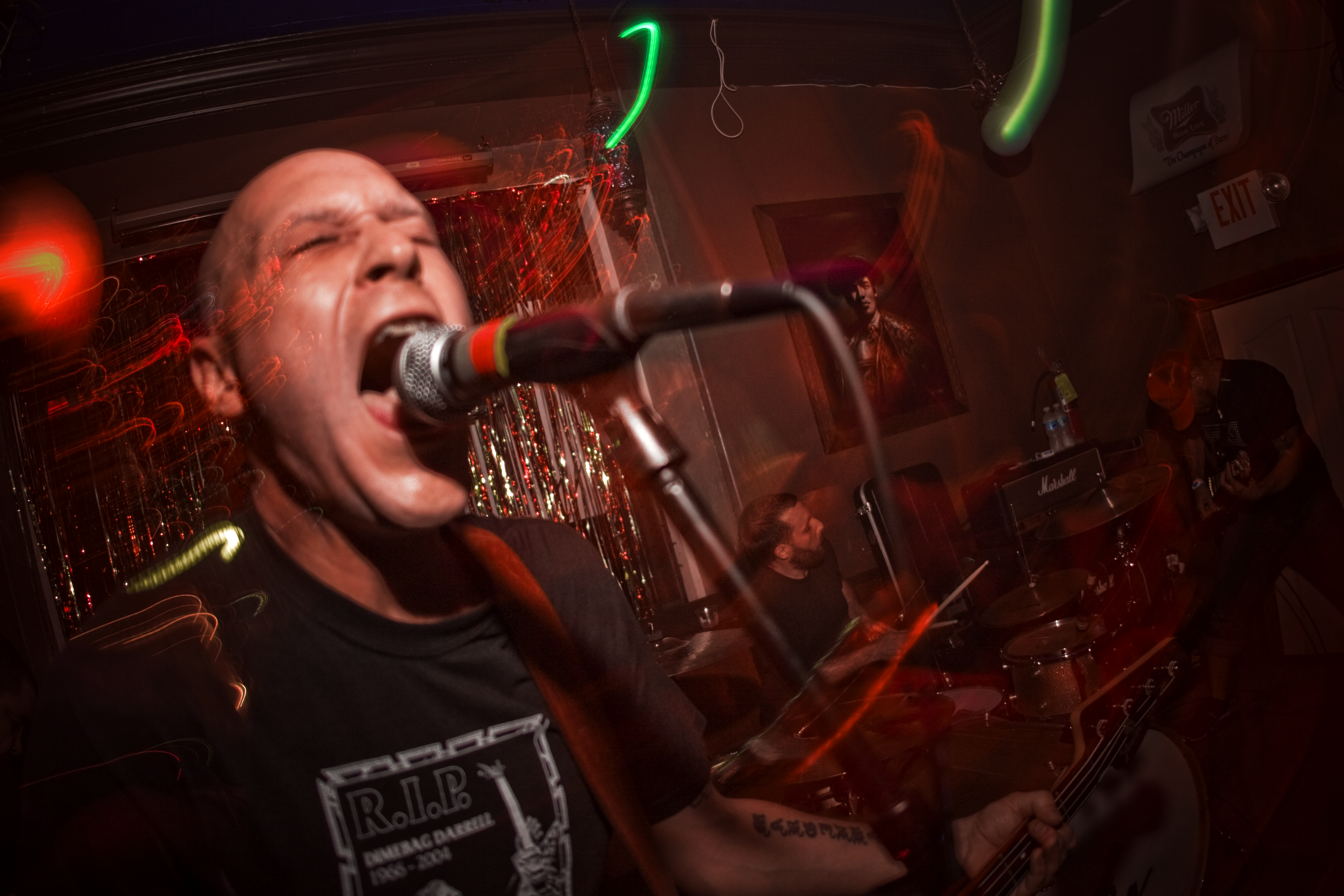
As Friends Rust's first reunion show at The Atlantic in Gainesville, Florida on August 15, 2008. From left to right: Stewart, Timothy Kirkpatrick and James Glayat.

Stewart rejoined As Friends Rust when the band reformed in March 2008, with the announcement of the European and British Back in Coffee Black Tour '08. It was further revealed that the band would be performing with its 1998–2000 line-up (referred to as "The Porch Days" line-up), including Moyal, Kirkpatrick, Simmons and Glayat. The Back in Coffee Black Tour '08 kicked off with a single American show at The Atlantic in Gainesville, Florida, on August 15, 2008. Three days later, the band flew to Europe and the United Kingdom for six shows spanning August 18–23, 2008. The reunion tour included concerts at the Camden Underworld in London, England, Conne Island in Leipzig, Germany and Ieperfest in Ypres, Belgium.

In 2014, As Friends Rust travelled to Asia for the Japan Tour 2014, which spanned from June 12–15, 2014, supported by Endzweck, Noy and Nervous Light of Sunday. In promotion of the tour, Japanese record label Cosmic Note released a best-of compilation album on compact disc titled Greatest Hits?, on June 4, 2014, which included a selection of the band's recordings from 1996 to 2002. The compilation was also released on compact cassette by Indonesian record label D'Kolektif on December 27, 2014, and on 12-inch vinyl by Dutch record label Shield Recordings on April 29, 2015.

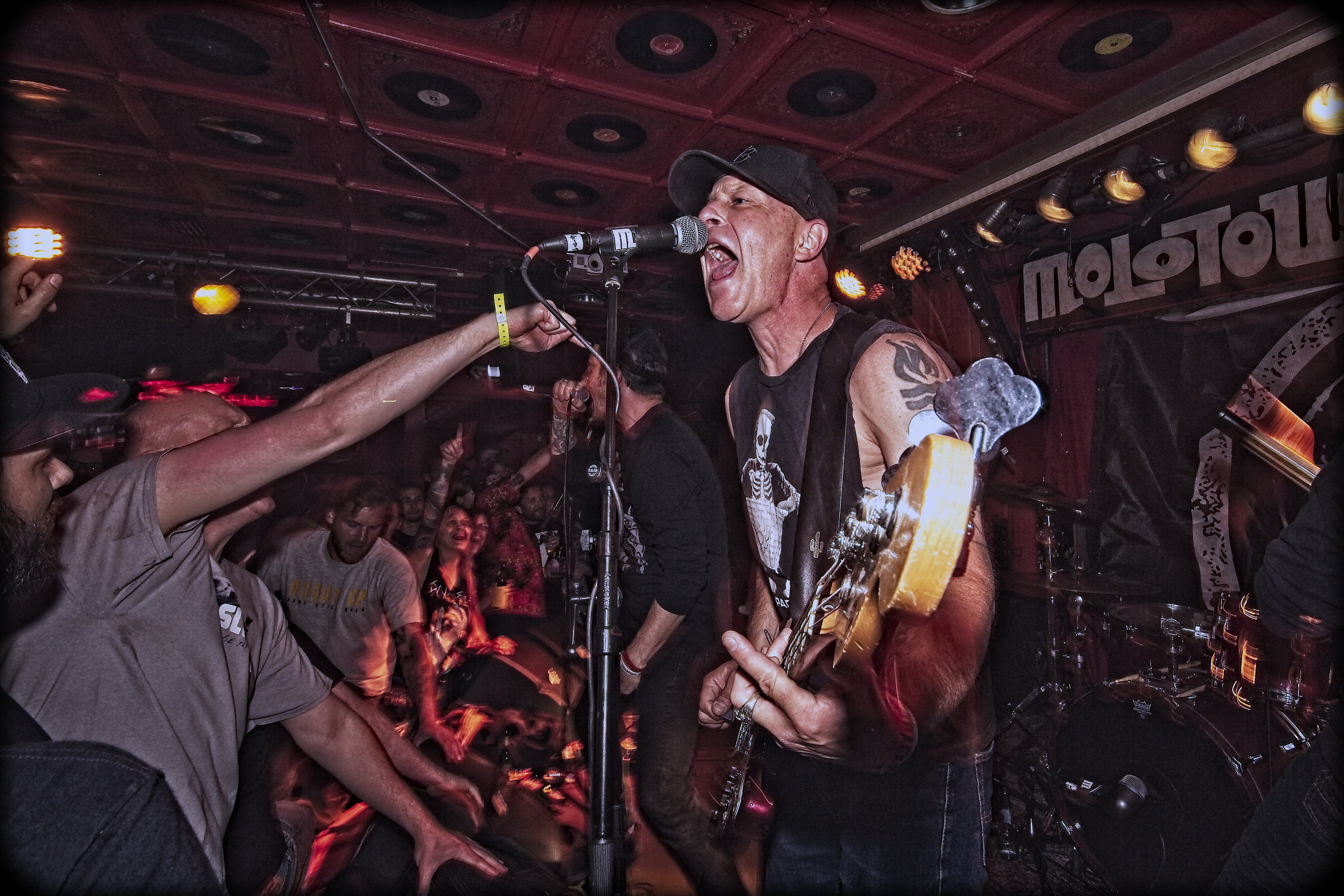
As Friends Rust performing at Booze Cruise Festival in Hamburg, Germany on June 8, 2019; Stewart's last show with the band. From left to right: Damien Moyal and Stewart.

As Friends Rust played three shows in 2015: the first at the Saint Vitus in Brooklyn, New York on April 30, 2015; the second at Groezrock festival in Meerhout, Belgium on May 2, 2015; and the last at The Wooly as part of The Fest in Gainesville, Florida on October 31, 2015. On May 22, 2015, German record label Demons Run Amok Entertainment released the compilation album The Porch Days: 1998 to 2000 on 12-inch vinyl. The release compiled all of the band's studio recordings from 1998 to 2000, as well as previously unreleased live recordings of two of the three songs composed-but-never-properly-recorded by the band with that line-up.

As Friends Rust performed three shows in 2019: the first at The Kingsland in Brooklyn, New York on April 25, 2019, and two on the same day at Molotow in Hamburg, Germany on June 8, 2019, as part of the Booze Cruise Festival. Stewart also performed two solo shows at Booze Cruise Festival, but at different venues and on different dates; one was on a boat on June 9, 2019, and the other at ÜberQuell Brauwerkstätten on June 10, 2019. Upon returning from Booze Cruise, Stewart and As Friends Rust parted ways.

=== Return to solo work (2015–2021) ===
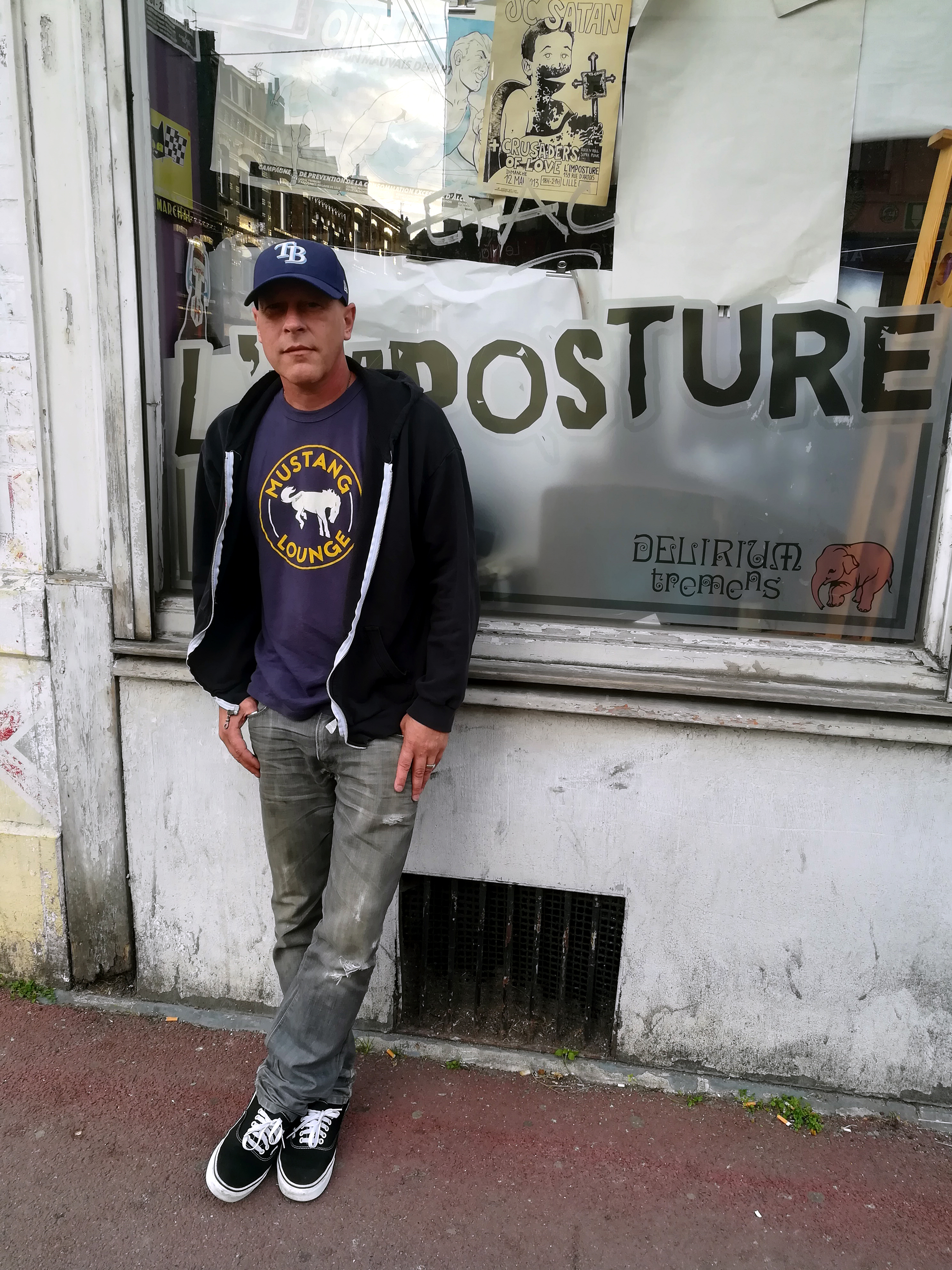
Stewart outside Bar L'imposture in Lille, France on September 19, 2018, prior to a show.

Stewart resumed performing solo shows in 2015, altering between bookings under his own name and as Grey Goose. By mid-2017, he had abandoned the Grey Goose moniker and steadily performed under his own name. In 2016, Stewart was featured on the Joe McMahon song "Time Won't Heal", which appears on the album Another Life, released in the United States by SmartPunk Records and in Europe by Gunner Records.

In November 2017, Stewart released a split album with Tim Holehouse through British record labels Aaahh!!! Real Records and Back From the Dead Records. The release was supported by a three-week European tour in November 2017. This was followed by the EP All Lo Fi on the Southern Front on Aaahh!!! Real Records, which was also promoted with another European tour in March–April 2018.

In October 2018, Stewart released the album Tropical Depression through Aaahh!!! Real Records and Sounds of Subterrania. The release was promoted by several European tours: the first, Tropical Depression European Tour 2018, spanned September–October 2018; the second, Tropical Depressions Over Germany Tour 2019, spanned March–April 2019; and the third took place in June 2019. A fourth European tour in promotion of the album was scheduled for 2020 but it was cancelled due to the COVID-19 pandemic. Aaahh!!! Real Records was planning to release Stewart's follow-up EP, I Am Love, I Am Light, in 2021, but it was shelved when Stewart died.

=== Personal life and death ===
Stewart married Lila Marie Schaller on July 9, 2005. They had one child, a son, Ocean Elliot Stewart, who was born on November 6, 2020.

He graduated from the University of Florida with a master's degree in urban and regional planning in 2009. Outside his music career, Stewart worked as a research analyst at the University of Florida's Shimberg Center for Housing Studies. He also served as president of the board of directors of the Neighborhood Housing and Development Corporation in Gainesville, Florida, and as a program officer at the Florida Community Design Center.

Stewart died at his home in Gainesville, Florida, on March 25, 2021, at the age of 45, from end-stage liver disease. A memorial service was held at Depot Park in Gainesville on March 31, 2021, and his ashes were later scattered off the coast of Cedar Key, Florida.

A benefit concert titled A Musical Tribute to Kaleb Stewart was held in his memory at the New World Brewery in Tampa, Florida, on May 15, 2021. Performers at the event included Jeff Brawer, Lou Collazo, Marc Ganancias, David Kibby, Anson Mitchell, John Nowicki, Peter Nuffer, Dan Padilla, Dave Decker, and Buck Sands.

== Discography ==
=== Studio albums ===
Title	Album details
Tim Holehouse / Kaleb Stewart (with Tim Holehouse)	Released: December 1, 2017; Label: Aaahh!!! Real / Back From the Dead
Tropical Depression	Released: October 12, 2018; Label: Sounds of Subterrania / Aaahh!!! Real

=== EPs ===
Title	Album details
All Lo Fi on the Southern Front	Released: March 16, 2018; Label: Aaahh!!! Real
