= The Fists of Time =

1998 debut extended play by As Friends Rust

- The Fists of Time European cover art.

EP by As Friends Rust
- Released: July 13, 1998; June 22, 2000 (reissue)
- Recorded: November 19, 1996 – May 9, 1999
- Studio: Wisner Productions, Davie, Florida; Goldentone Studios, Gainesville, Florida
- Genre: Melodic hardcore; emotional hardcore
- Length: 15:22; 20:07 (reissue)
- Label: Good Life; Doghouse
- Producer: James Paul Wisner; Rob McGregor

As Friends Rust chronology
As Friends Rust Demo (1996)	The Fists of Time (1998)	As Friends Rust / Discount (1998)

2000 reissue cover
- The Fists of Time: An Anthology of Short Fiction and Non-Fiction American re-issue cover art.

The Fists of Time is the debut extended play by American melodic hardcore band As Friends Rust. It was originally released by Belgian record label Good Life Recordings on July 13, 1998, on compact disc and 10" vinyl. American record label Doghouse Records reissued the release, under the expanded title The Fists of Time: An Anthology of Short Fiction and Non-Fiction, on compact disc, 12" vinyl and digitally, with new artwork and two additional songs, on June 22, 2000. In promotion of the release, As Friends Rust toured the United States, United Kingdom and Europe several times between June 1998 and September 2000. The bands that accompanied As Friends Rust on these tours include Discount, Dillinger Four, Strike Anywhere, Grade, Ensign, Ignite, Good Clean Fun, Garrison, Glasseater, Mid Carson July, The Agency, Purusam, Fast Times and Keith Welsh.

While promoting the release, As Friends Rust also performed at notable festivals like Hellfest in Syracuse, New York (two years in a row), Wilkes-Barre Festival in Wilkes-Barre, Pennsylvania (two years in a row), Ieper Hardcore Festival in Ypres, Belgium (two years in a row), Gainesvillefest in Gainesville, Florida, Krazy Fest in Louisville, Kentucky, Detroit Fest, in Eastpointe, Michigan, More Than Music in Columbus, Ohio, Tin Can Full of Dreams in Lawrence, Massachusetts, Midwest Florida Punk Festival, in Sarasota, Florida, Mixed Messages in Minneapolis, Minnesota, Pheer Festival, in College Park, Maryland, The Copper Sun Indie Records Winter Festival in Wilkes-Barre, Pennsylvania, Dour Festival in Dour, Belgium, Festival Hardcore in Sant Feliu de Guíxols, Spain, Metropolis Festival in Rotterdam, Netherlands, TurboPunk Festival, in Poznań, Poland, Transmitter Festival in Hohenems, Austria, Complete MADness Festival in Potsdam, Germany, Good Life Winter Festival, in Kortrijk, Belgium and Good Life Midsummer Hardcore Festival in Kuurne, Belgium.

Though most of the touring in promotion of The Fists of Time featured the same core members, the majority of the material contained on the release was recorded with an earlier and much different line-up. The band would later go through an almost completely new line-up following the EP's touring. Four of the songs contained on The Fists of Time were recorded by the band's original line-up, with lead vocalist Damien Moyal, guitarist Henry Olmino, bass guitarist Jeronimo Gomez and drummer Matthew Crum. Moyal later reformed the band and recruited guitarists Gordon Tarpley and Joseph Simmons, bass guitarist and backing vocalist Kaleb Stewart and drummer Timothy Kirkpatrick to record a single new song for the release; Tarpley departed immediately afterwards and was replaced by Peter Bartsocas who toured with the band for most of 1998. Bartsocas was ultimately replaced by James Glayat, who recorded another new song with the band (included on the reissue) and did most of the touring during the next two years, until he was briefly replaced by Bartsocas for the final month of touring. Moyal also suffered voice problems during the final tour in September 2000, leading Stewart to sing at a handful of shows and Bartsocas to switch to bass guitar. Kirkpatrick, Stewart and Glayat all quit the band in September 2000.

== Composition and recording ==
As Friends Rust formed in September 1996 when vocalist Damien Moyal (formerly of Shai Hulud and Morning Again) was invited to a band practice in Davie, Florida by guitarist Henry Olmino, bass guitarist Jeronimo Gomez and drummer Matthew Crum. The band recorded six songs, "Encante", "Ruffian", "Broken Brain", "When People Resort to Name Calling", "The Only Point" and an untitled instrumental acoustic song, at Wisner Productions in Davie, Florida from November 19–22, 1996 with producer James Paul Wisner.

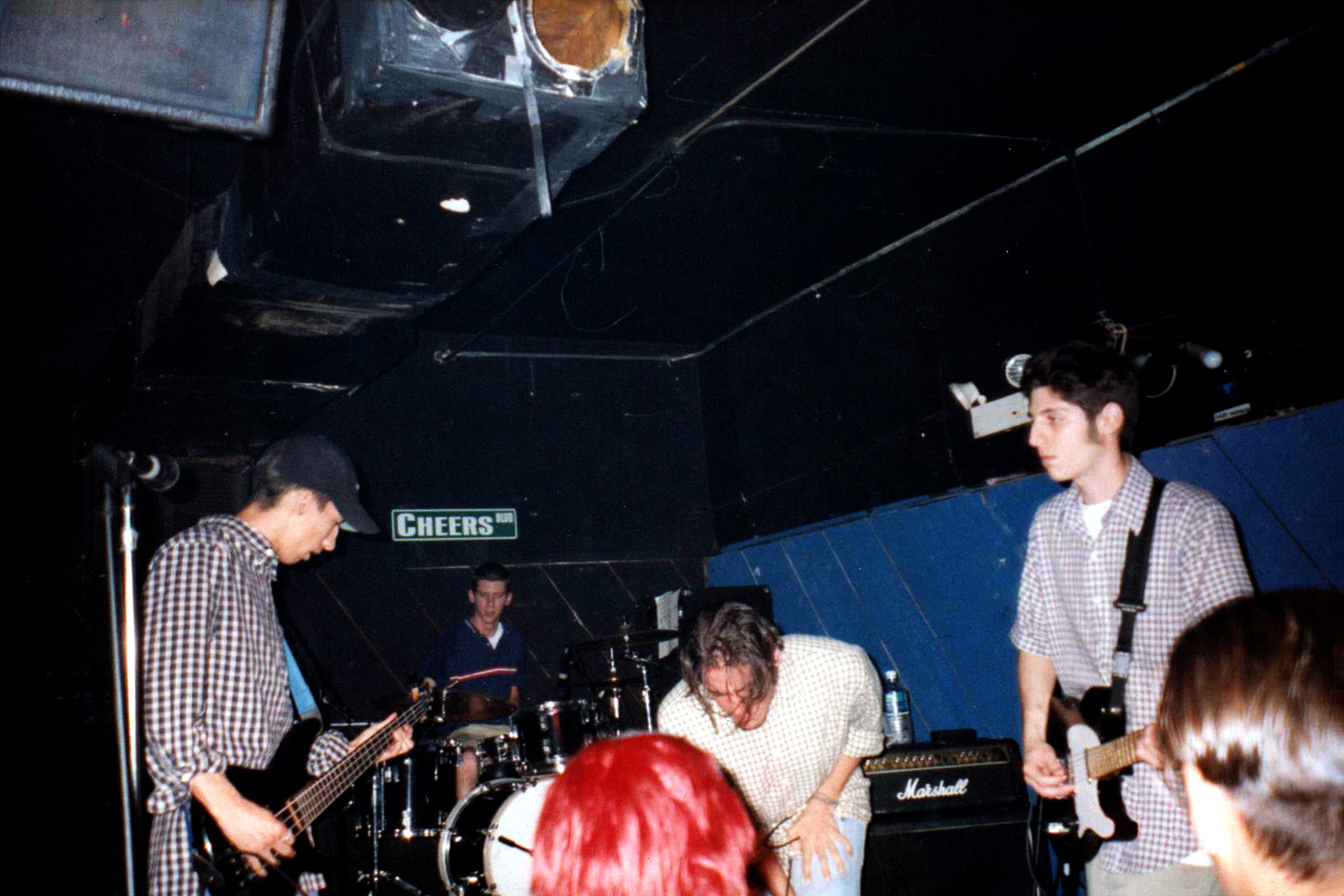
As Friends Rust performing with its original members at Cheers in Coconut Grove, Florida on November 11, 1996. From left to right: Jeronimo Gomez, Matthew Crum, Damien Moyal and Henry Olmino.

Three of the songs recorded, "Encante", "Ruffian" and "Broken Brain", were used on a well-circulated demo tape that the band shopped to record labels. Some of the record labels that received copies of this demo include Doghouse Records, Equal Vision Records, Revelation Records and Jade Tree Records; none were interested in signing As Friends Rust. By February 1997, As Friends Rust had fallen apart as Moyal dedicated more time to his other bands Culture and Bird of Ill Omen, which led Olmino, Gomez and Crum to continue playing together but renaming the band Red Letter Day with a new vocalist.

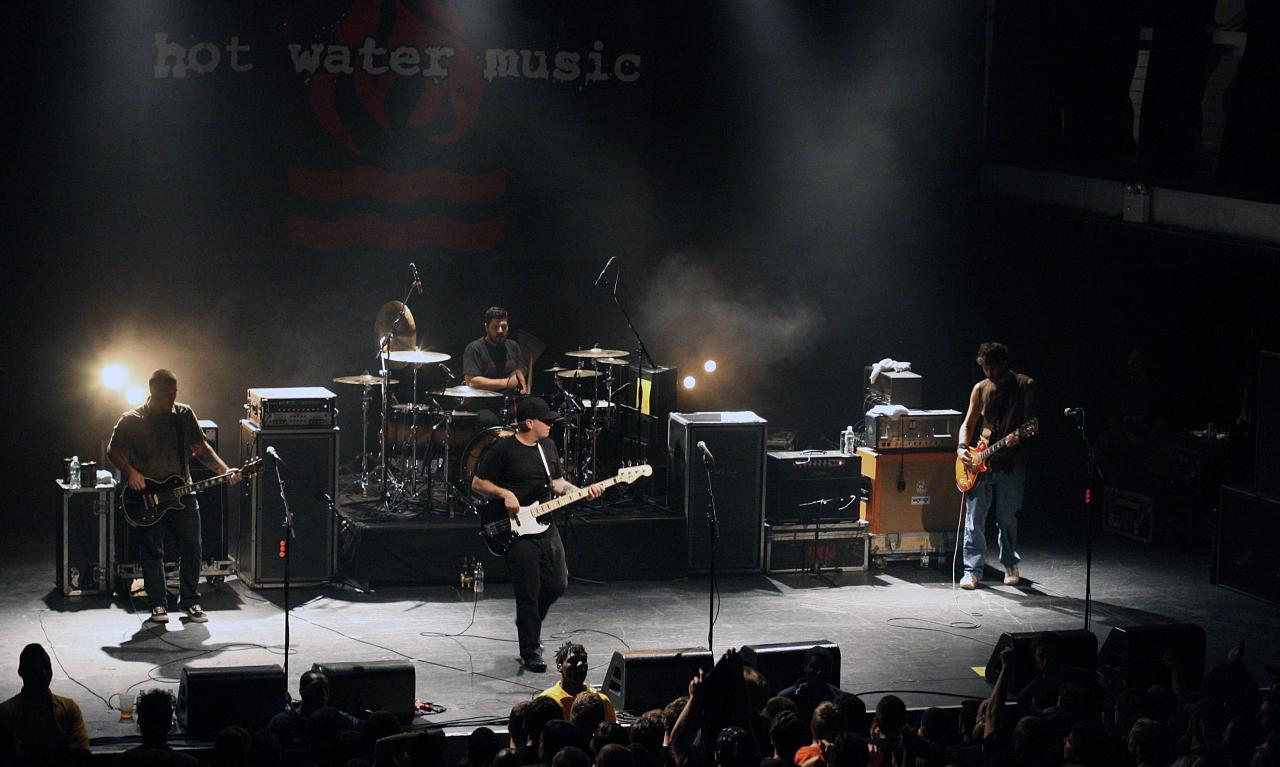
The first song, "Home Is Where the Heart Aches", features Hot Water Music members, Chris Wollard, Chuck Ragan and George Rebelo, on backing vocals.

Moyal eventually reformed As Friends Rust after moving to Gainesville, Florida in June 1997, recruiting guitarists Stephen Looker and Gordon Tarpley; all three were then-members of Culture. In September 1997, Timothy Kirkpatrick (formerly of the emo band Roosevelt) joined both As Friends Rust and Culture. Looker quit As Friends Rust and Culture simultaneously to join Morning Again in March 1998. Moyal quickly asked ex-Morning Again and ex-Bird of Ill Omen guitarist Joseph Simmons to join both Culture and As Friends Rust, and recruited Kaleb Stewart as As Friends Rust's new bass guitarist.

With an intact line-up, As Friends Rust recorded the song "Home Is Where the Heart Aches" at Goldentone Studios in late March 1998 with producer Rob McGregor. Stewart invited three close friends, members of Hot Water Music Chuck Ragan, George Rebelo and Chris Wollard, to provide backup vocals on the recording.

== Release, packaging and promotion ==
=== Packaging and promoting The Fists of Time (1998–1999) ===
"Home Is Where the Heart Aches" was combined with four songs from the 1996 recording session; "Encante", "Ruffian", "When People Resort to Name Calling" and "Broken Brain"; to make up the band's debut EP, The Fists of Time, released by Belgian record label Good Life Recordings on compact disc and 10" vinyl on July 13, 1998. Good Life Recordings had previously released material by Culture and Morning Again, so As Friends Rust was a natural fit on the record label. The cover art and most of the booklet art for The Fists of Time was designed by Moyal, with other illustrations provided by Mike Taylor and band photographs taken by Mark Murrmann.

Before the reformed line-up had a chance to play any shows, Tarpley quit As Friends Rust (and Culture simultaneously) in April 1998, leading Moyal to recruit ex-Morning Again bass guitarist and then-Bird of Ill Omen guitarist (though the band was on hiatus) Peter Bartsocas as As Friends Rust's new guitarist and backing vocalist. In promotion of its forthcoming The Fists of Time EP, the band embarked on a five-week tour of the United States, from June 11 to July 18, 1998, accompanied by Vero Beach, Florida-based punk rock band Discount and Minneapolis, Minnesota-based pop punk rock band Dillinger Four. The tour included stops to perform at such festivals as More Than Music in Columbus, Ohio, Tin Can Full of Dreams in Lawrence, Massachusetts and Wilkes-Barre Festival in Wilkes-Barre, Pennsylvania.

After replacing Bartsocas with James Glayat (who had played in Roosevelt with Kirkpatrick) in October 1998, As Friends Rust returned to Goldentone Studios to record "The First Song on the Tape You Make Her" with McGregor (the song had been written with Bartsocas). McGregor, Stewart and Keith Welsh provided backing vocals on the recording. The song, which had been partly written with Bartsocas, would first appear on a split CD and 7" vinyl with Discount, also released by Good Life Recordings in December 1998. The two bands, accompanied by Swedish hardcore group Purusam, embarked on a six-week European tour, from December 3, 1998, to January 14, 1999, in promotion of The Fists of Time and the split release. The European tour included a stop to play at the Good Life Winter Festival, in Kortrijk, Belgium.

=== Touring in promotion of As Friends Rust (1999–2000) ===
In late 1998, As Friends Rust was signed to American record label Doghouse Records, and in May 1999 returned to Goldentone Studios to record its follow-up extended play. The eponymous extended play was released in the United States via Doghouse Records on September 17, 1999, while the European version was put out by Good Life Recordings in July 1999, erroneously promoted under the titles God Hour and 6-Song CD.

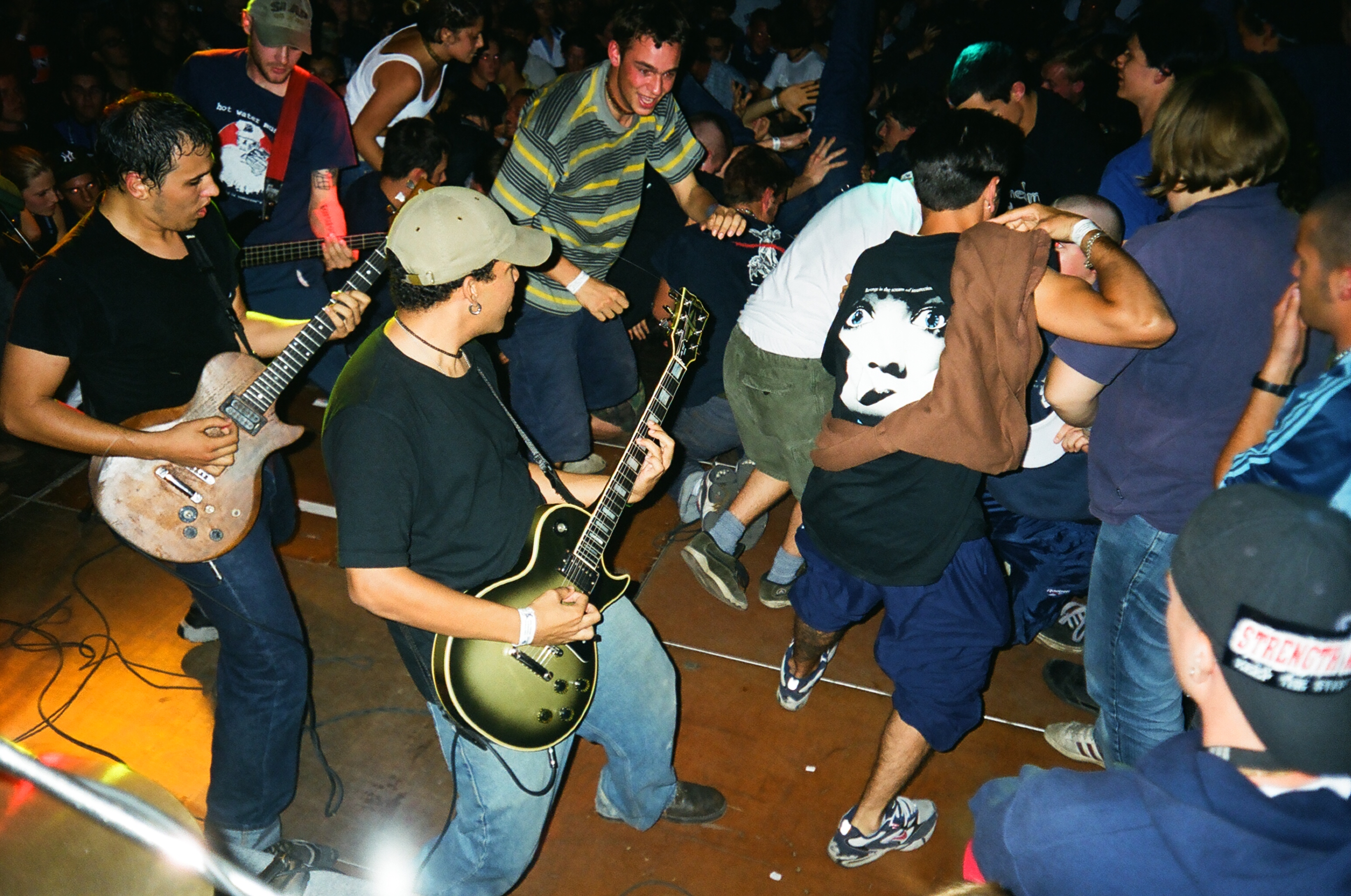
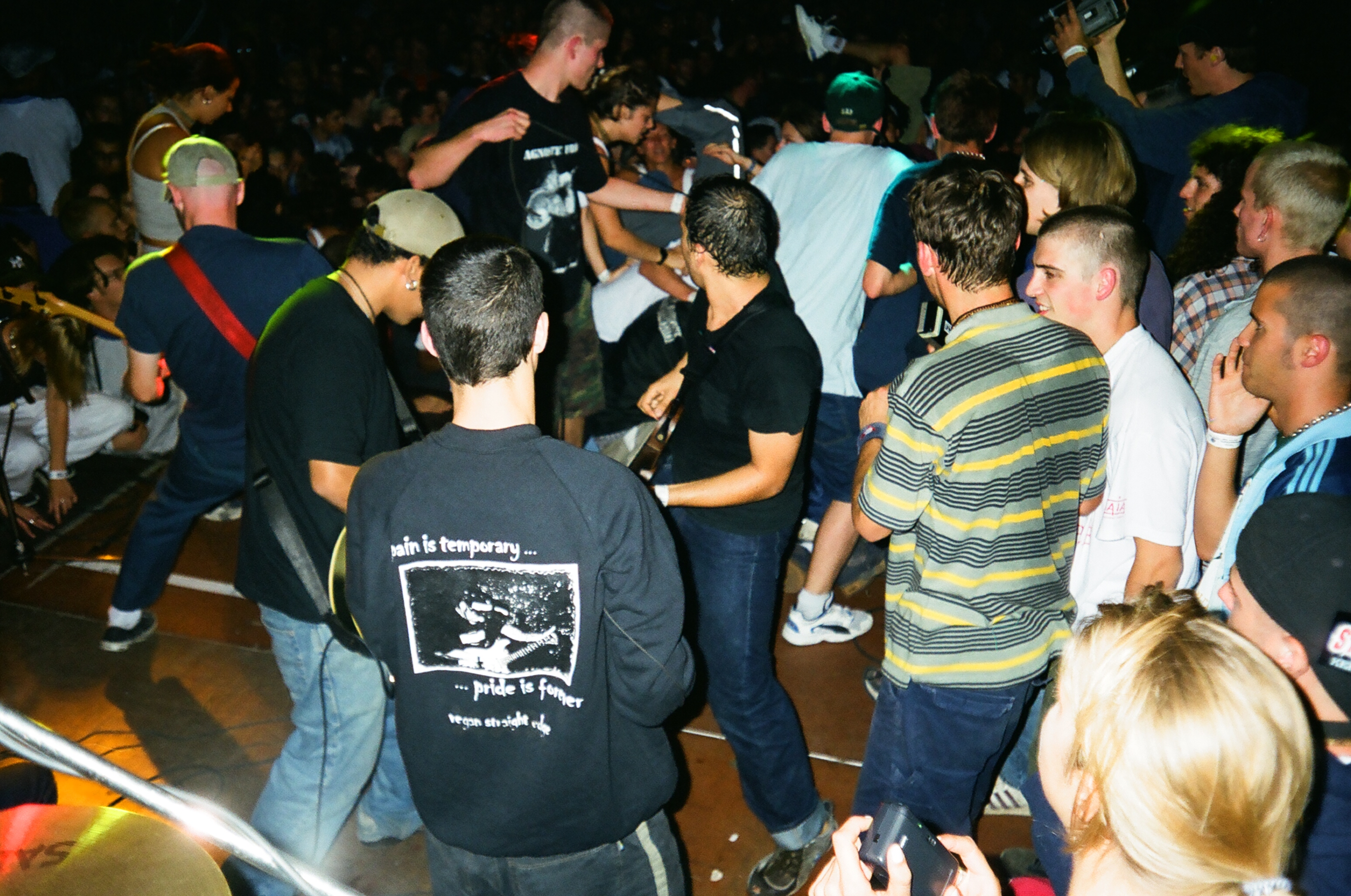
As Friends Rust headlining Ieper Hardcore Festival in Ypres, Belgium on August 20, 1999. After jumping into the audience to crowd surf, lead vocalist Damien Moyal disappeared under a moshpit while the band continued to play "Encante", only to resurface during a stage invasion by the end of the song.

In promotion of its new self-titled EP, and with slightly better American distribution of The Fists of Time through Good Life Recordings' American distributor, Eulogy Recordings, As Friends Rust toured the east coast of the United States during three weeks in June 1999, accompanied by acoustic musician Keith Welsh. The tour included stops to play the Wilkes-Barre Summer Music Festival in Kingston, Pennsylvania and Syracuse Hell Fest in Syracuse, New York.

The band quickly followed up with a five-week European tour in July and August 1999, playing at such festivals as Good Life Midsummer Hardcore Festival in Kuurne, Belgium, Festival Hardcore in Sant Feliu de Guíxols, Spain and Ieper Hardcore Festival in Ypres, Belgium. Footage of the band's performance at Ieper Hardcore Festival was later included on Good Life Recordings' 2000 VHS release Good Life Recordings Presents: Good Life T.V. Video Sampler #1. The European tour was intended to be shared with Hot Water Music, but due to disagreements over top-billing, the two bands ended up booking separate tours. The incident caused a riff between the two bands that never fully healed, and lead As Friends Rust to include "Thanks to all of the Gainesville bands that were actually willing to play shows with us. There is division." in the liner notes of their upcoming eponymous extended play; a protesting reference to Hot Water Music's album No Division. As Friends Rust headlined its own tour, playing a handful of cross-over shows with New Jersey melodic hardcore band Ensign and California melodic hardcore band Ignite.

In December 1999, the band played Gainesvillefest in Gainesville, Florida. A December 1999 to January 2000 tour with The August Prophecy and Dragbody was booked but cancelled at the last minute. During the first half of 2000, As Friends Rust went on mini tours with New Jersey hardcore band Fast Times and Washington D.C. hardcore band Good Clean Fun, and also played The Copper Sun Indie Records Winter Festival in Wilkes-Barre, Pennsylvania, the Detroit Festival, in Eastpointe, Michigan and Krazy Fest 3 in Louisville, Kentucky.

=== The Fists of Time: An Anthology of Short Fiction and Non-Fiction re-issue and promotion (2000) ===
In 2000, Doghouse Records re-issued The Fists of Time on compact disc, 12" vinyl and digitally under the expanded title The Fists of Time: An Anthology of Short Fiction and Non-Fiction. The released was originally scheduled for May 15, 2000, but was delayed to June 22, 2000. The Doghouse Records reissue added the songs "The First Song on the Tape You Make Her" and "Operation", which had both previously been exclusive to Good Life Recordings and the European market. The digital version was made available through one of the first digital music stores, eMusic. The Doghouse Records re-issue featured an all-new design and layout by Jason Page, though the CD jewel case spine included a typo in the release title, spelling it as The Fist of Time. With the Doghouse Records re-release, it was announced that all previous As Friends Rust releases on Good Life Recordings would be going out-of-print, though the Belgian record label later repressed The Fists of Time on a pictured 10" vinyl in 2001.

As Friends Rust immediately embarked on a four-week tour to promote the release, playing shows across the entire United States with Virginia hardcore band Strike Anywhere from May 29 to June 30, 2000. The tour included several cross-over shows with Glasseater, Mid Carson July and The Agency (the three of which were on tour together), as well as stops to play such festivals as Mixed Messages in Minneapolis, Minnesota, Pheer Festival, in College Park, Maryland and Hellfest 2K in Auburn, New York (which As Friends Rust did not play due to a last-minute change in venue).

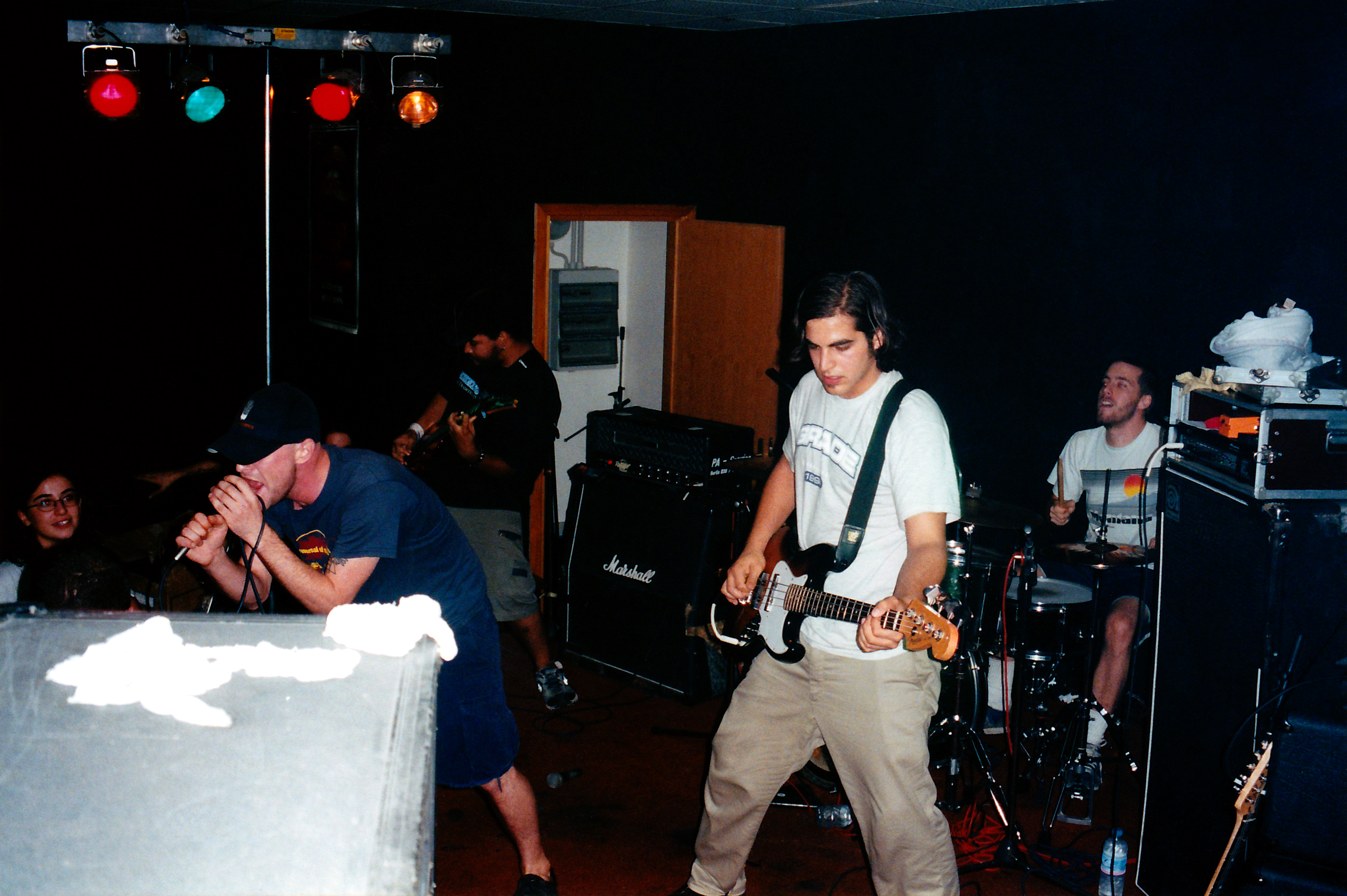
As Friends Rust performing at Plan 9 in Limena, Italy on September 16, 2000. One of the few shows when Kaleb Stewart took up lead vocals while Damien Moyal was sick. From left to right: Stewart, Joseph Simmons, Peter Bartsocas and Timothy Kirkpatrick.

In July 2000, Good Life Recordings invited As Friends Rust back to Europe for a week's worth of shows in Belgium and the Netherlands, including a performance at Dour Festival in Dour, Belgium and another at Metropolis Festival in Rotterdam, Netherlands. In mid-August 2000, the band returned to Europe for a full five-week tour, which included a handful of cross-over shows with Canadian melodic hardcore band Grade, New Jersey melodic hardcore band Ensign and Massachusetts post-hardcore band Garrison. This European tour also included stops at Ieper Hardcore Festival in Ypres, Belgium, TurboPunk Festival, in Poznań, Poland, Transmitter Festival in Hohenems, Austria and Complete MADness Festival in Potsdam, Germany.

Prior to leaving on its second 2000 European tour, Glayat and Kirkpatrick had announced their desire to leave the band upon returning home. However, tensions during the tour ultimately caused a much bigger change in membership. On the way to the Ieper Hardcore Festival, less than a week into the tour, the band was involved in a motor vehicle accident in Belgium, which badly damaged their van and resulted with Glayat suffering torn ligaments in his leg. With Glayat wearing a split, the band continued on to half a week's worth of shows in the United Kingdom, following which the injured guitarist opted to fly back home instead of crossing back into Europe. Ex-guitarist Bartsocas, who was visiting Europe at the same time and had been travelling with the band, filled the vacant guitarist position for the next four weeks of shows.

Three weeks later, Moyal suffered from laryngitis and lost his voice, leading Stewart to switch from bass guitar to lead vocals, and Bartsocas temporarily filling in as bass guitarist. Moyal and Simmons called ex-Culture, ex-Morning Again and ex-Crucible bass guitarist Christopher "Floyd" Beckham (Glayat's at-the-time roommate) from Europe, asking him to join As Friends Rust as its new guitarist upon returning home, much to Stewart's dismay, leading the latter to quit the band. Moyal and Stewart were initially to stay over in Europe following As Friends Rust's tour, for a second tour with their other band Bridgeburne R, but Moyal was forced to find a new bass guitarist for both bands. Glayat and Kirkpatrick went on to play in Moments in Grace, while Stewart joined The Sheryl Cro(w) Mags and started Grey Goose.

== Critical reception ==
Professional ratings
Review scores
Source	Rating
Aversion Online	Positive
Bound by Modern Age	Positive
Delusions of Adequacy	Positive
Giant Robot	Positive
HeartattaCk	Positive
HeartattaCk	Positive
Hit List	Positive
IMPACT Press	Positive
Law of Inertia	Positive
Maximumrocknroll	Positive
Maximumrocknroll	Positive
Pasażer	Positive
Reflections	Positive
Slug and Lettuce	Positive
Suburban Voice	Positive
Think Again	Positive
Trust	Positive

The Fists of Time received overall positive critical acclaim upon release and during its reissue, though Doghouse Records' 2000 re-release was often criticized for repackaging solely previously available material and not including unreleased cuts. Writing for Lost at Sea Magazine, Andy Vaughn called it "one of the best EP’s of all time and captures this band's talent at its best."

As Friends Rust's style was described by critics as emotional hardcore, emotive hardcore, old school melodic hardcore, melodic and energetic pop punk, emo punk rock, pop-core and upbeat and catchy.

The band was often categorized as having Washington D.C. hardcore influences and the Gainesville sound, and was quickly compared to other melodic hardcore and post-hardcore bands like Florida's Hot Water Music, and Michigan's Small Brown Bike. Other comparisons were drawn to Dag Nasty, Sense Field, Lifetime, Dayspring, Grade, Les Savy Fav, and Brutal Juice, as well as to the band members' previous bands Culture and Morning Again.

Reviewers often praised Moyal's lyrics and vocal delivery, noting them as clever, emotional, honest, introspective, intelligent, intense, heavy, dark, angst-ridden, and melodramatic.

== Track listing ==
Credits are adapted from the EP's liner notes.

Good Life Recordings version
No.	Title	Lyrics	Music	Length
1.	"Home Is Where the Heart Aches"	Moyal	Kirkpatrick; Simmons; Stewart; Tarpley	2:29
2.	"Encante"	Moyal	Olmino; Gomez; Crum	3:52
3.	"Ruffian"	Moyal	Olmino; Gomez; Crum	3:06
4.	"When People Resort to Name Calling"	Moyal	Olmino; Gomez; Crum	3:38
5.	"Broken Brain"	Moyal	Olmino; Gomez; Crum	2:18
Total length:				15:22

Doghouse Records version
No.	Title	Lyrics	Music	Length
1.	"The First Song on the Tape You Make Her"	Moyal	Kirkpatrick; Simmons; Stewart; Bartsocas	2:59
2.	"Home Is Where the Heart Aches"	Moyal	Kirkpatrick; Simmons; Stewart; Tarpley	2:31
3.	"Encante"	Moyal	Olmino; Gomez; Crum	3:53
4.	"Ruffian"	Moyal	Olmino; Gomez; Crum	3:06
5.	"When People Resort to Name Calling"	Moyal	Olmino; Gomez; Crum	3:39
6.	"Broken Brain"	Moyal	Olmino; Gomez; Crum	2:20
7.	"Operation"	Lehrer; Rogerson	Lehrer; Rogerson	1:40
Total length:				20:07

== Personnel ==
Credits are adapted from the EP's liner notes.

As Friends Rust

- Damien Moyal – lead vocals (all songs)
- Henry Olmino – guitar ("Encante", "Ruffian", "When People Resort to Name Calling" and "Broken Brain")
- Joseph Simmons – guitar and backing vocals ("Home Is Where the Heart Aches", "The First Song on the Tape You Make Her" and "Operation")
- Gordon Tarpley – guitar and backing vocals ("Home Is Where the Heart Aches")
- James Glayat – guitar ("The First Song on the Tape You Make Her" and "Operation")
- Jeronimo Gomez – bass guitar ("Encante", "Ruffian", "When People Resort to Name Calling" and "Broken Brain")
- Kaleb Stewart – bass guitar and backing vocals ("Home Is Where the Heart Aches", "The First Song on the Tape You Make Her" and "Operation")
- Matthew Crum – drums ("Encante", "Ruffian", "When People Resort to Name Calling" and "Broken Brain")
- Timothy Kirkpatrick – drums and backing vocals ("Home Is Where the Heart Aches", "The First Song on the Tape You Make Her" and "Operation")

Guest musicians

- Chuck Ragan – backing vocals on "Home Is Where the Heart Aches"
- George Rebelo – backing vocals on "Home Is Where the Heart Aches"
- Chris Wollard – backing vocals on "Home Is Where the Heart Aches"
- Keith Welsh – backing vocals on "The First Song on the Tape You Make Her"
- Rob McGregor – backing vocals on "Home Is Where the Heart Aches" and "The First Song on the Tape You Make Her"

Production

- James Paul Wisner – recording engineer, mixer and producer at Wisner Productions ("Encante", "Ruffian", "When People Resort to Name Calling" and "Broken Brain")
- Rob McGregor – recording engineer, mixer and producer at Goldentone Studios ("Home Is Where the Heart Aches", "The First Song on the Tape You Make Her" and "Operation")
- Damien Moyal – artwork and design (Good Life Recordings version)
- Mike Taylor – artwork (Good Life Recordings version)
- Mark Murrmann – photography (Good Life Recordings version)
- Jason Page – photography and design (Doghouse Records version)

== Release history ==
Release formats for The Fists of Time
Region	Date	Label	Format	Catalog
Belgium	July 13, 1998	Good Life Recordings	CD	ED025
Belgium	July 13, 1998	Good Life Recordings	10" Vinyl	ED025
United States	June 22, 2000	Doghouse Records	CD	DOG070
United States	June 22, 2000	Doghouse Records	12" Vinyl	DOG070
United States	June 22, 2000	Doghouse Records	Digital	DOG070
