= Chris Wollard =

American singer

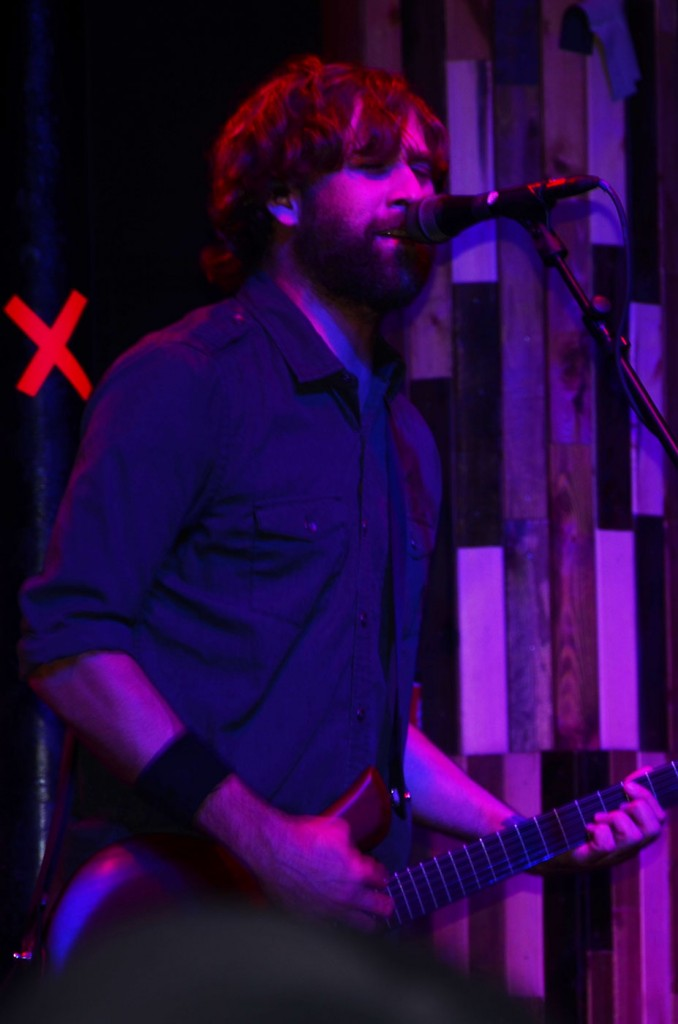
- Wollard playing with Hot Water Music at the Observatory in Santa Ana

Background information
- Origin: Gainesville, Florida

Chris Wollard (born 1975) is an American singer and musician. He is best known as the vocalist and guitarist of the post-hardcore band Hot Water Music, which he co-founded with co-vocalist and co-guitarist Chuck Ragan, drummer George Rebelo and bass guitarist Jason Black in October 1994. He is also the lead vocalist and guitarist in the punk rock band The Draft, and the acoustic guitarist of the acoustic-folk band Rumbleseat.

In 2000, Wollard formed a new punk rock band, The Sheryl Cro(w) Mags (later renamed Cro(w)s), with ex-As Friends Rust and Bridgeburne R bass guitarist and close friend Kaleb Stewart. The band released the single "The Sheryl Cro(w) Mags' #1 Hit / Watch For Repetition" in 2000 on American record labels No Idea Records and Cro(w)s and Pawns Records, and embarked on a three-week tour of the East Coast and Midwest United States in May 2001, accompanied by another Hot Water Music side-project, Unitas. The band followed up with the album Durty Bunny, which was released after the band changed its name to Cro(w)s, in 2002 on German record label Sounds of Subterrania.

Other Gainesville-based projects in which Wollard has participated include Baroque (featuring Samantha Jones) and The Blacktop Cadence. He is also given two co-writing credits on the Bad Religion album The Empire Strikes First on the songs "The Quickening" and "Beyond Electric Dreams". In 1998, he and two other members of Hot Water Music provided backup vocals on the As Friends Rust song "Home Is Where the Heart Aches", released on the band's debut EP The Fists of Time.

Wollard released a split 7-inch w/Mike Hale (formerly of Gunmoll) on Asian Man Records. His first solo record, the self-titled Chris Wollard & The Ship Thieves, was released on No Idea Records in 2009, followed by Canyons in 2012 and an EP, How Much Sh** Can you Take?, in 2013. The Ship Thieves are named after the book The Ship Thieves by historian Sian Rees.

During the early Hot Water Music years, Wollard played Gibson guitars, but in more recent years has switched to a Fender Telecaster.
