= Joseph Simmons (guitarist) =

American guitarist

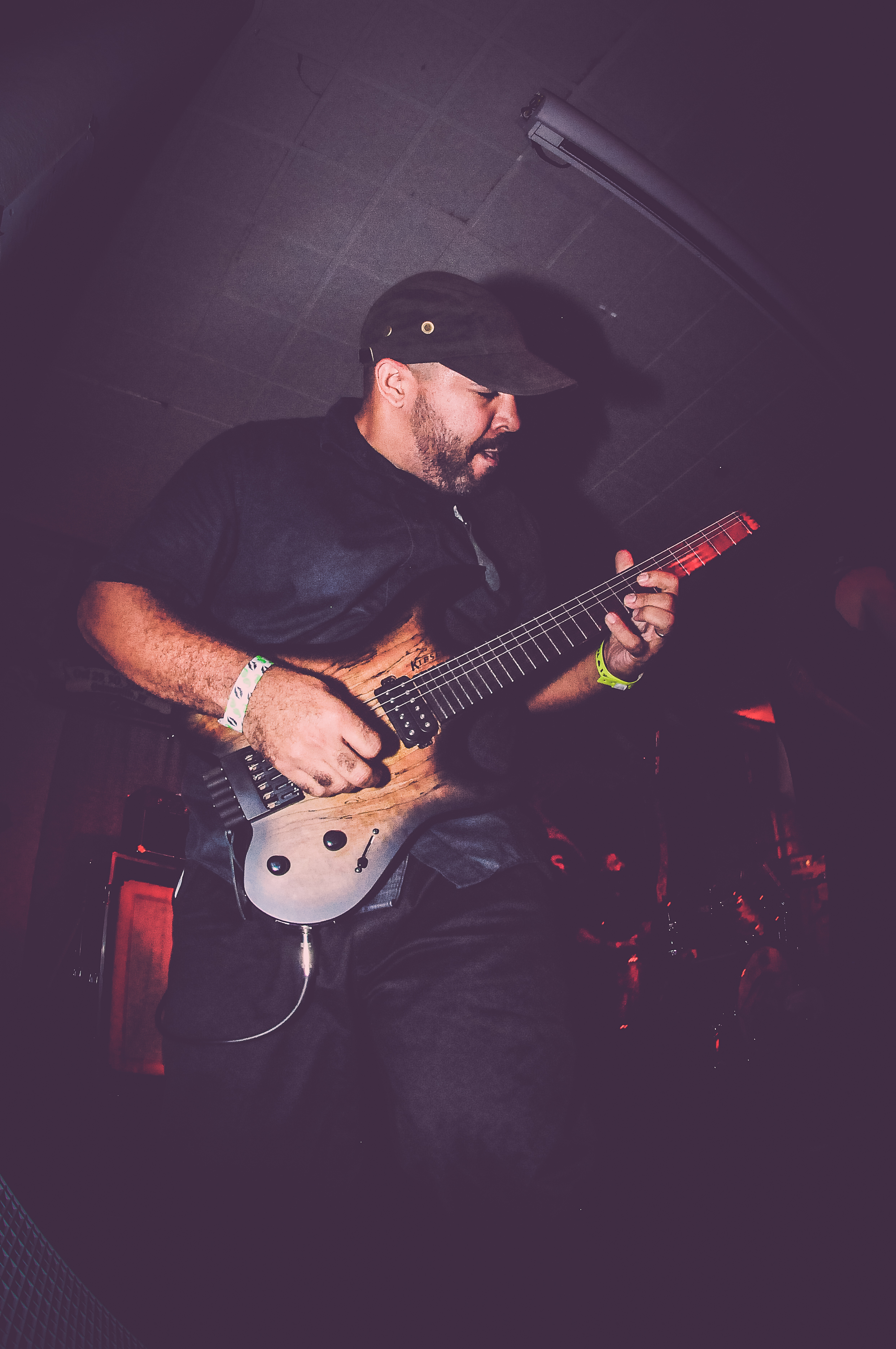
- Simmons performing with As Friends Rust at The Fest 14 in Gainesville, Florida, on October 31, 2015.

Background information
- Also known as: Joe Simmons
- Born: Joseph Lee Simmons; June 18, 1978; Houston, Texas, U.S.
- Origin: Coral Springs, Florida
- Genres: Black metal; emotional hardcore; indie rock; melodic hardcore; metallic hardcore; post-hardcore; punk rock
- Occupations: Guitarist; bass guitarist; songwriter; brewer
- Instruments: Bass guitar; guitar
- Years active: 1994–present
- Labels: Alveran; Askone; Cosmic Note; Contraband Goods; D'Kolektif; Demons Run Amok; Doghouse; Equal Vision; Eulogy; Fiddler; Genet; Ghetto Josh; Golf; Good Life; Howling Bull; Initial; New Ethic; No Idea; Revelation; Shield; Sorepoint; Sound Study; Think Tank; Toybox; Undergroove; Unity Worldwide; Vegan
- Member of: As Friends Rust; Rot in Coffins
- Formerly of: Bird of Ill Omen; Culture; Dinner Time; Fork in the Road; Lock Down; Morning Again; Salem; Some Sort of Radio

Joseph Lee Simmons (born June 18, 1978) is an American guitarist, bass guitarist, songwriter and brewer. Originally from Houston, Texas, Simmons grew up in Coral Springs, Florida, where he notably played in the hardcore punk bands Dinner Time and Lock Down, the sludge metal band Bird of Ill Omen and the metallic hardcore band Morning Again. He later moved to Gainesville, Florida, where he played in the metallic hardcore bands Culture and Some Sort of Radio, the melodic hardcore band As Friends Rust, and the emotional hardcore / post-hardcore band Salem. He currently plays in the black metal band Rot in Coffins.

From 2007 to 2013, Simmons was the co-owner of the independent record label Sound Study Recordings, which he co-founded with former Bird of Ill Omen, As Friends Rust and Salem band-mate Thomas Rankine and recording engineer Matthew Finch. The record label released music from such artists as Burning Love, Chris Wollard and the Ship Thieves, Comadre, Coliseum, Off with Their Heads and Ruiner.

Outside of the music industry, Simmons works in the brewing industry, having held the position of head brewer at Swamp Head Brewery and First Magnitude Brewing Company, both based in Gainesville, Florida. In 2019, he and partner Matthew Juaire opened their own brewery, Bay Cannon Beer Company, in Tampa, Florida. Following Bay Cannon's closure in 2023, Simmons opened Grand Scheme Brewing in Gainesville.

== Background ==
=== Early bands, Fork in the Road and Bird of Ill Omen (1994–1997) ===
Simmons' early bands include Dinner Time and Lock Down, two hardcore punk bands based in Coral Springs, Florida, active during the mid-1990s. In August 1996, Simmons joined the newly formed North Miami, Florida-based sludge metal/metalcore band Fork in the Road, which quickly changed name to Bird of Ill Omen. The band also included vocalist Damien Moyal (who had previously been in Culture, Shai Hulud and Morning Again), guitarist José Martinez (who would later play in Poison the Well), bass guitarist Thomas Rankine (who would later play in As Friends Rust and Further Seems Forever) and drummer George Rios (formerly of doom metal band Floor). Martinez, Rankine and Rios had previously played in the emo band Crestfallen earlier that year.

While writing a full-length album's worth of material during most of late 1996 and early 1997, Bird of Ill Omen played local shows with Shai Hulud, Morning Again, Discount, Strongarm, Vision of Disorder, Earth Crisis, Zao and Cavity. The band's membership was revised when former Morning Again bass guitarist Peter Bartsocas (who would also later play in As Friends Rust) replaced Martinez in November 1996, and the recruiting of a second vocalist, Rob Ogman. In March 1997, Simmons was kicked out of Bird of Ill Omen, after he was asked to join Morning Again as their new guitarist (having already filled in as bass guitarist in December 1996 after Bartsocas' departure). The band quickly recruited Andrew Logan, who had played in Crestfallen, to replace Simmons. Moyal was displeased about Simmons' firing, which was done without his knowledge while he was out of town with Culture, and in turn lead to his quitting the band.

By this time, the band had written half a dozen songs with Simmons and Moyal for a planned full-length debut. The band ended up using three of these songs ("Spoon", "Pronoun" and "Now Ruin Is") on Bird of Ill Omen's debut album, Self, Dare You Still Breathe?. The album was released on compact disc in February 1998 by Eulogy Recordings, on 12-inch vinyl in July 1998 by Think Tank Records, and on compact cassette in October 2021 by Contraband Goods.

=== Morning Again (1996, 1997–1998, 1999) ===
Simmons first played with Morning Again on December 26, 1996 (while still a member of Bird of Ill Omen), when he filled in as bass guitarist for a concert in Atlanta, Georgia, following Peter Bartsocas' departure. The band then also included guitarist John Wylie, drummer Louie Long, vocalist Kevin Byers, and fill-in second guitarist Stephen Looker (who was then playing in Culture, but filled in for Morning Again after Micheal Wolz's departure). Morning Again's line-up eventually stabilized with Gerardo Villarroel on bass guitar and Ryan Stafford on guitar.

Simmons was formally asked to join Morning Again as its new guitarist in March 1997, replacing Stafford, which lead to his dismissal from Bird of Ill Omen. Although Stafford had recorded guitar tracks in February 1997 for the band's forthcoming release, Martyr (Good Life Recordings), Wylie chose to credit Simmons in the liner notes in place of Stafford (a picture of Stafford is, however, included in the booklet above Simmons' name). In promotion of Martyr, Morning Again embarked on a tour of the United States and Canada with Bird of Ill Omen during June 1997, which included performances at Syracuse 3-Day Super Festival in Syracuse, New York and Indianapolis Hardcore Festival in Indianapolis, Indiana. Upon returning home, Long was replaced by Matthew Thomas.

Continuing its promotion of Martyr, Morning Again embarked on a European tour in July–August 1997, accompanied by Belgian hardcore bands Congress and Hitch. The tour included stops to perform at Malmejock-Skatefestival in Oostmalle, Belgium, The Ultimate Hardcore Festival in Dilsen-Stokkem, Belgium and Hardcore: The Next Generation in Ypres, Belgium. While in Europe, Morning Again stopped over at Midas Studios in Lokeren, Belgium in August 1997, to record a new song, "Dictation of Beauty", with producer Tony De Block. The song was tracked especially for a split 7-inch vinyl and compact disc with 25 ta Life, released by Good Life Recordings in January 1998. Morning Again returned for a second European tour, this time accompanied by Agnostic Front, Vision and Maximum Penalty, spanning November–December 1997.

In February 1998, Morning Again entered Studio 13 in Deerfield Beach, Florida, to record its ten-song debut album, As Tradition Dies Slowly, with producer Jeremy Staska. Only three weeks after the album was recorded, Simmons was fired and replaced by Stephen Looker, who had just quit both Culture and As Friends Rust to join Morning Again. As a result, Simmons moved to Gainesville, Florida and joined both Culture and As Friends Rust, taking up Looker's former position. The album was eventually released on June 30, 1998, through Revelation Records, but Morning Again would break up a mere four months later in October 1998.

In December 1999, Simmons briefly rejoined the band to perform two secret reunion shows under the names Hand of Hope and Cleanest War; the first at Club Q in Davie Florida, the second at Gainesvillefest in Gainesville, Florida. The line-up at those shows also included Wylie, Moyal, Eric Ervin and Jason Dooley. A live concert recorded during the band's first Belgian tour in 1997 (with Simmons on guitar), was included as bonus tracks on the compact disc compilation Hand of the Martyr, co-released by Eulogy Recordings and Alveran Records on April 30, 2002. The original version of "Dictation of Beauty" recorded in Belgium was repackaged again on the 12-inch vinyl compilation II, released by Germany's Demons Run Amok Entertainment on September 25, 2015.

=== Culture, Some Sort of Radio and As Friends Rust (1998–2002) ===
In early March 1998, immediately after having been kicked out of Morning Again and replaced by guitarist Stephen Looker, Simmons was invited by former Bird of Ill Omen band-mate Damien Moyal to move to Gainesville, Florida and simultaneously join the established metallic hardcore band Culture and the newly reformed melodic hardcore band As Friends Rust (taking Looker's former position in both bands). The two bands then shared several members, including vocalist Moyal, guitarist Gordon Tarpley and drummer Timothy Kirkpatrick; Culture additionally included bass guitarist Christopher "Floyd" Beckham, while As Friends Rust included bass guitarist and backing vocalist Kaleb Stewart.

With its new line-up, As Friends Rust recorded the song "Home Is Where the Heart Aches" at Goldentone Studios in late March 1998 with producer Rob McGregor. "Home Is Where the Heart Aches" was combined with four songs from the band's 1996 demo recording session to make up As Friends Rust's debut extended play, The Fists of Time, released by Good Life Recordings in July 1998. Meanwhile, Culture also wrote a new song, "Pimping the Revolution". Although the song was never recorded properly in studio, a live recording from Ieperfest was released on Belgian record label Genet Records' 1999 Various Artists compact disc compilation, Vort'n Vis Hardcore Festival 1998. In September 2012, Eulogy Recordings, Ghetto Josh Records and New Ethic Record Co-Op co-released the compact disc and 12-inch vinyl compilation of previously unreleased material, From the Vaults: Demos and Outtakes 1993–1998, which included the same live recording.

From April–May 1998, Culture was booked for a two-month North American tour with Shutdown, but the band's van broke down on the way to the first show and Culture was unable to continue the tour. Frustrated by the event, Tarpley quit both As Friends Rust and Culture simultaneously in April 1998, leading Moyal to recruit ex-Morning Again bass guitarist and then-guitarist of Bird of Ill Omen (though the band was on hiatus) Peter Bartsocas as As Friends Rust's new guitarist and co-backing vocalist, and ex-Wounded Knee guitarist Kenneth Brian Sulak for Culture. As Friends Rust embarked on a five-week tour of the United States accompanied by Discount and Dillinger Four in June–July 1998. The tour included stops to play at such festivals as More Than Music in Columbus, Ohio, Tin Can Full of Dreams in Lawrence, Massachusetts and Wilkes-Barre Festival in Wilkes-Barre, Pennsylvania.

Culture then toured Europe in August–September 1998, which included a stop to play the Ieper Hardcore Festival in Ypres, Belgium. Upon returning home, Simmons and Kirkpatrick both quit Culture, but remained with As Friends Rust. From the ashes of Culture, Moyal and Simmons re-teamed with bass guitarist Gordon Tarpley to form Some Sort of Radio (named after an unreleased As Friends Rust song), a metal project which was active from late 1998 to early 1999, and also featured guitarist Rob Proctor (from Assück) and drummer Bradley Bulifant (later of Some Day Soon and The Æffect). Although recordings of rehearsals exist, Some Sort of Radio never entered a studio nor played a show.

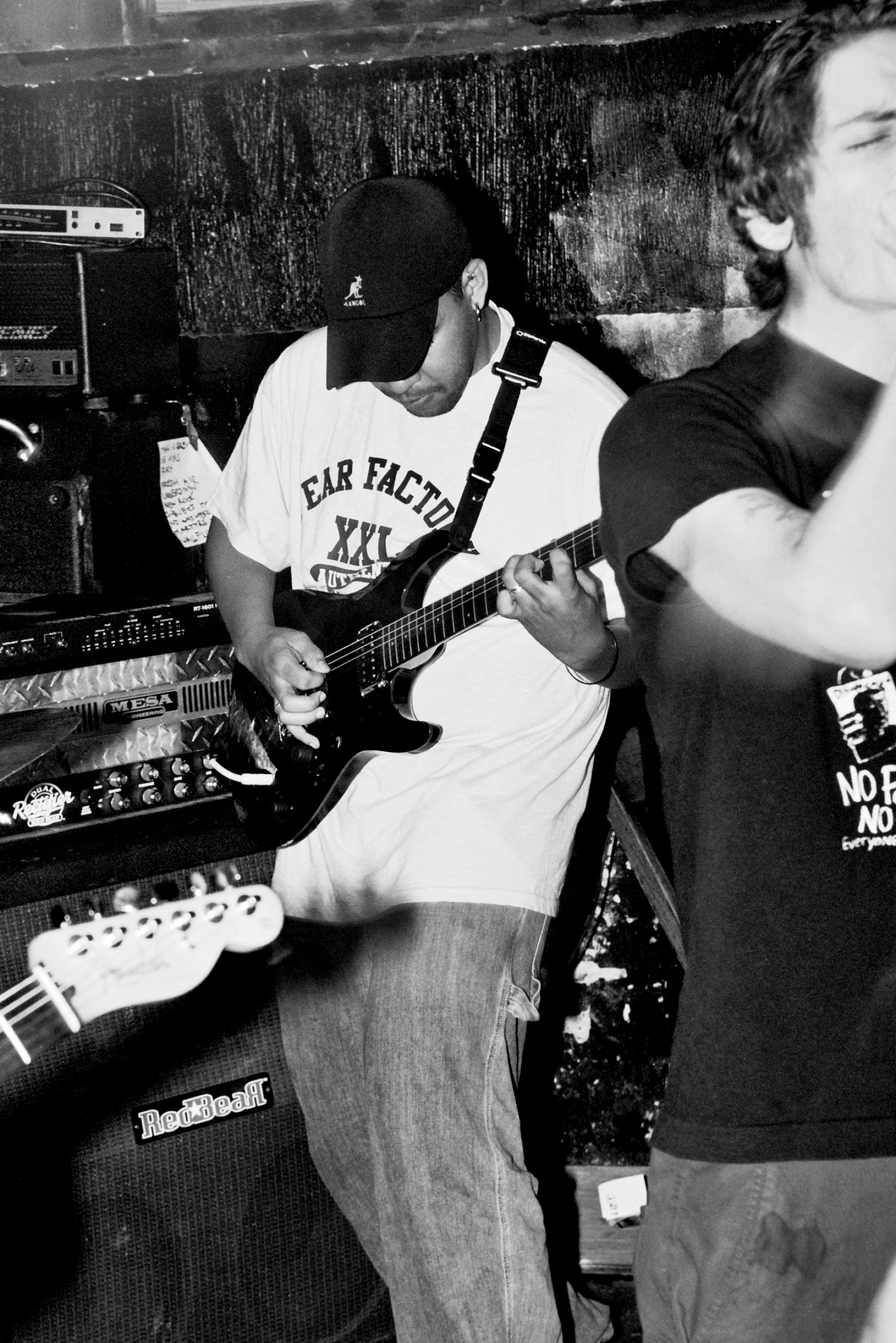
Simmons (left) and lead vocalist Damien Moyal (right) performing with As Friends Rust at 33 Tyler Street in Buffalo, New York on June 29, 2000.

In October 1998, guitarist James Glayat replaced Bartsocas in As Friends Rust, and the band returned to Goldentone Studios to record "The First Song on the Tape You Make Her" with McGregor. The song, which had been partly written with Bartsocas, would appear on a split CD and 7-inch vinyl with Discount, released by Good Life Recordings in December 1998. As Friends Rust returned on the road to tour Europe and the United Kingdom from December 1998 to January 1999, accompanied by Discount and Purusam.

In late 1998, As Friends Rust signed a three-record deal with record label Doghouse Records, and in May 1999 returned to Goldentone Studios to record six songs with McGregor. As Friends Rust was released by Doghouse Records on September 17, 1999; the European version, released earlier in July 1999, was erroneously promoted under the titles God Hour and 6-Song CD by Good Life Recordings. As Friends Rust toured the United States in June–July 1999, accompanied by Keith Welsh. The tour included stops to play the Wilkes-Barre Summer Music Festival in Kingston, Pennsylvania and Syracuse Hell Fest in Syracuse, New York. The band quickly followed up with a five-week European and British tour in July–August 1999, playing at such festivals as Good Life Midsummer Hardcore Festival in Kuurne, Belgium, Festival Hardcore in Sant Feliu De Guíxols, Spain and Ieper Hardcore Festival in Ypres, Belgium.

On October 5, 1999, Japanese record label Howling Bull Entertainment released the compilation Eleven Songs, which included a selection of As Friends Rust material from 1996–1999. In December 1999, the band played Gainesvillefest in Gainesville, Florida. In late 1999, Simmons contributed backing vocals to grindcore band Crucible's song "Wretch of Shadows", which appeared on the groups' debut No Idea Records release, My Heart Is a Merciless Piece of Metal and Fire, in 2000.

During the first half of 2000, As Friends Rust went on mini-tours with Fast Times and Good Clean Fun, and also played The Copper Sun Indie Records Winter Festival in Wilkes-Barre, Pennsylvania, Detroit Festival in Detroit, Michigan and Krazy Fest 3 in Louisville, Kentucky. On June 22, 2000, Doghouse Records re-issued The Fists of Time. As Friends Rust immediately embarked on a tour with Strike Anywhere to promote the release, playing shows across the entire United States in June 2000. The tour included several cross-over shows with Glasseater, Mid Carson July and The Agency (the three of which were on a separate tour together), as well as stops to play such festivals as Mixed Messages in Minneapolis, Minnesota, Pheer Festival in College Park, Maryland and Hellfest 2K in Auburn, New York (the last of which As Friends Rust did not play due to a last-minute change in venue).

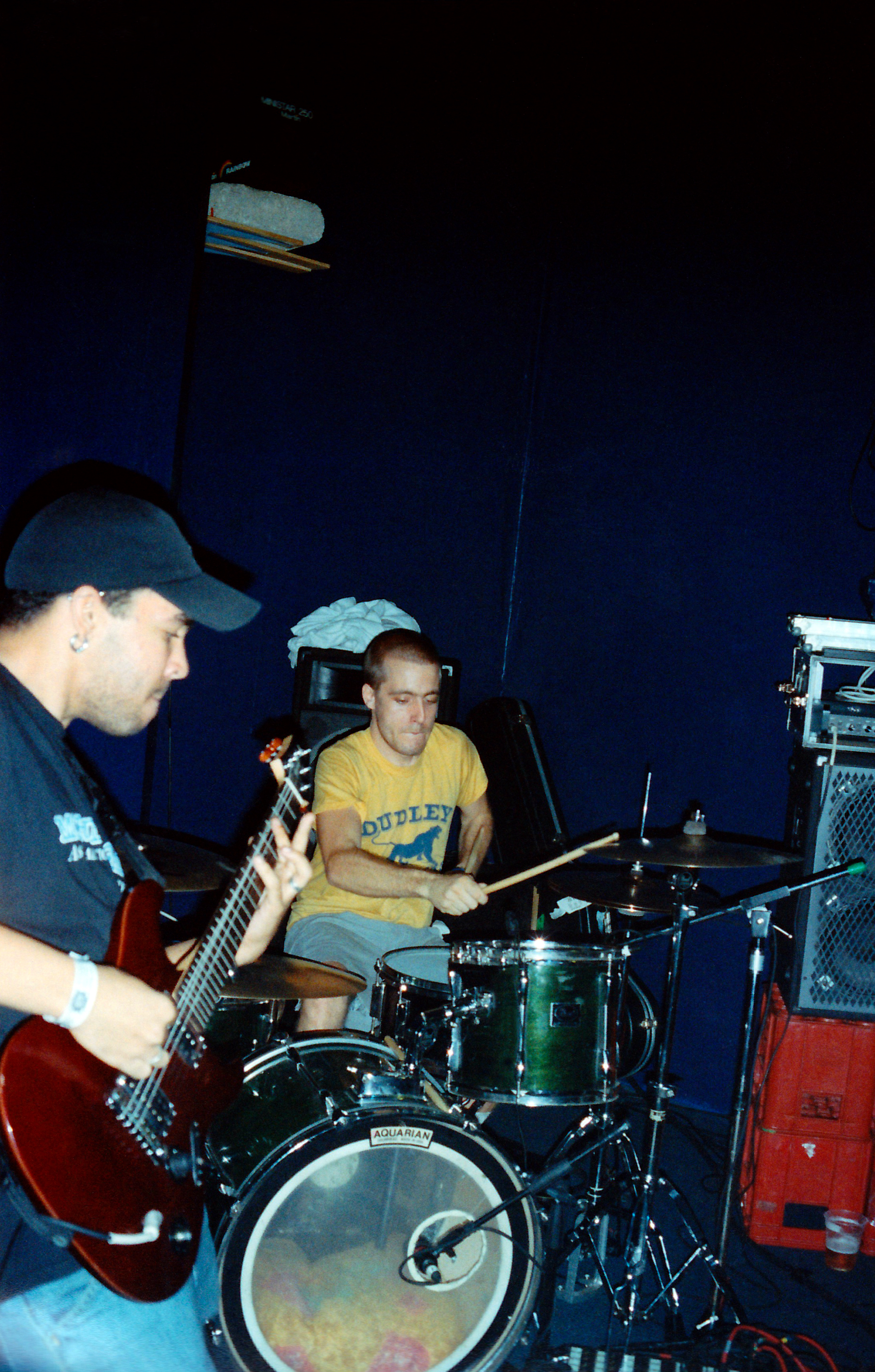
Simmons and drummer Timothy Kirkpatrick performing with As Friends Rust at The Star and Garter in Manchester, England on August 24, 2000.

In July 2000, Good Life Recordings invited As Friends Rust back to Europe for a week's worth of shows in Belgium and the Netherlands, including a performance at Dour Festival in Dour, Belgium and another at Metropolis Festival in Rotterdam, Netherlands. A month later, the band returned to Europe and the United Kingdom for a full five-week tour, from August–September 2000, which included a handful of cross-over shows with Grade, Ensign and Garrison. This European and British tour also included stops at Ieper Hardcore Festival in Ypres, Belgium, TurboPunk Festival, in Poznań, Poland, Transmitter Festival in Hohenems, Austria and Complete MADness Festival in Potsdam, Germany.

Prior to leaving for Europe and the United Kingdom in August 2000, Kirkpatrick and Glayat had announced their desire to leave the band upon returning home. However, tensions during the tour ultimately caused a much bigger change in membership. On the way to Ieper Hardcore Festival, less than a week into the tour, the band was involved in a motor vehicle accident in Belgium, which badly damaged the touring van and resulted with Glayat suffering from torn ligaments in his leg. With Glayat wearing a splint, the band continued on to half a week's worth of shows in the United Kingdom, following which the injured guitarist opted to fly back home instead of crossing back into Europe. Ex-guitarist Bartsocas, who was visiting Europe at the same time and had been travelling with the band, filled the vacant guitarist position for the next four weeks of shows. Three weeks later, Moyal suffered from laryngitis and lost his voice, leading Stewart to switch from bass guitar to lead vocals, and Bartsocas temporarily filling in as bass guitarist. Moyal and Simmons called ex-Culture, ex-Morning Again and ex-Crucible bass guitarist Beckham (Glayat's at-the-time roommate) from Europe, asking him to join As Friends Rust as Glayat's replacement upon returning home, much to Stewart's dismay, leading the latter to quit the band.

In February 2001, Moyal, Simmons and Beckham recruited former Twelve Tribes drummer Alexander Vernon and future Rehasher bass guitarist Guillermo Amador to continue on with As Friends Rust. This line-up wrote and recorded two songs at Goldentone Studios with McGregor in late February 2001, both of which were released as Morningleaver / This Is Me Hating You by Doghouse Records as part of its 7-inch vinyl Fan Series in March 2001. Further line-up changes resulted with Zachary Swain (formerly of Rosalind, Adversary and Carlisle) replacing Vernon on drums in March 2001, and Thomas Rankine (formerly of Crestfallen, Bird of Ill Omen, Dead Men's Theory, Anchorman and Crucible) replacing Amador on bass guitar in April 2001. Within four months, the band had written enough new songs for a full-length album. As Friends Rust recorded ten songs for its debut full-length Won in July 2001, with producer James Paul Wisner at Wisner Productions. After some delays, Won was released on October 5, 2001, in Japan by Howling Bull Entertainment, on October 15, 2001, in Europe by German record label Defiance Records and on October 23, 2001, in the United States by Doghouse Records.

As Friends Rust toured full-time in support of Won, starting with an American summer tour with Vangard, Keepsake and Further Seems Forever in August–September 2001. The last leg of the American tour was cut short due to the September 11 attacks in New York City (As Friends Rust was scheduled to play the city three days later), but the band managed to perform at the Orlando Magicfest in Orlando, Florida, Furnace Fest in Birmingham, Alabama, and Philly Music Festival in Philadelphia, Pennsylvania. As Friends Rust then reunited with Strike Anywhere for a five-week European and British tour from October–December 2001, supported by Planes Mistaken for Stars and Durango 95. British record label Golf Records reissued the band's compilation album Eleven Songs on compact disc on October 22, 2001. A highlight performance at London, England's Camden Underworld from November 16, 2001, was filmed and later released on video and DVD by British home video company Punkervision on December 17, 2002.

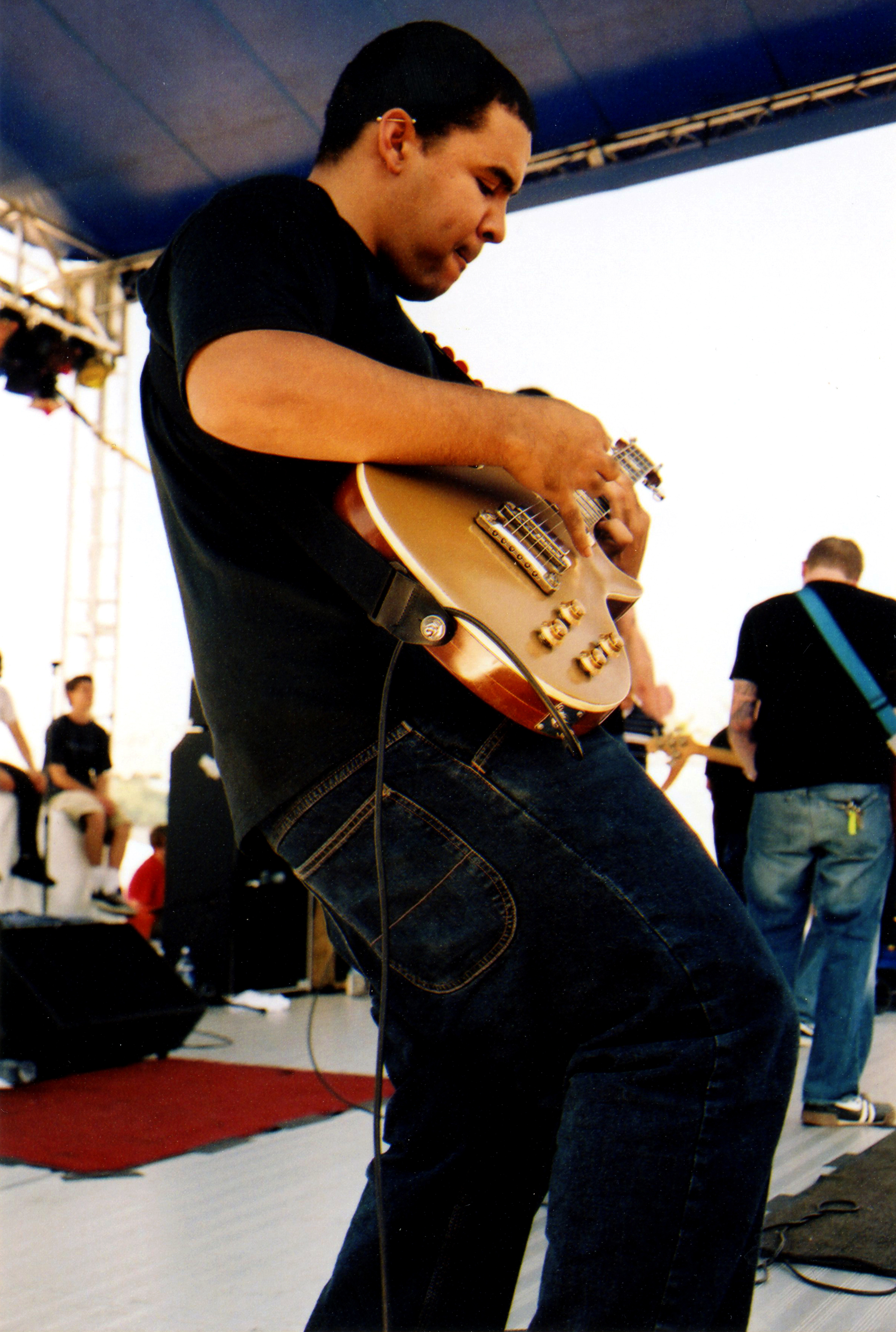
Simmons performing with As Friends Rust at Krazy Fest 5 in Louisville, Kentucky on June 22, 2002.

In February 2002, As Friends Rust recorded five songs at Wisner Productions with producer James Paul Wisner, as part of a one-off loan-out to Equal Vision Records. Tension within the band resulted with Moyal recording his vocals separately and co-producing the material without the other four members' presence. A Young Trophy Band in the Parlance of Our Times was released on compact disc and 12-inch vinyl on May 27, 2002, by Defiance Records in Europe and on May 28, 2002, by Equal Vision Records in the United States. Less than two weeks after the recording session, Moyal quit the band. At the time of Moyal's departure, As Friends Rust already had several upcoming shows scheduled and was in the midst of booking an entire year's worth of tours. The band was also talking about writing a second full-length album (to fulfill its Doghouse Records contract), and was being courted by larger record labels. Beckham initially stepped up as temporary lead vocalist and Tarpley returned to fill the vacant guitarist position, as the band embarked on a tour supporting Sick of It All, Shai Hulud and Thursday in March 2002. This was immediately followed by another tour with This Day Forward, Coheed and Cambria, The Stryder, Fairweather, Liars Academy and Prevent Falls, and a one-off date opening for Agnostic Front in New York.

Adam D'Zurilla (formerly of Short Order, Esteem, Die Tomorrow and Kumité) was finally welcomed as Moyal's replacement in late March 2002, allowing Beckham to return to playing guitar, and the band toured with Bloodlet and Hotwire, followed by a performance at Gorefest in Miami, Florida. In the last week of May 2002, As Friends Rust played a week's worth of Florida shows supporting Prevent Falls and Whippersnapper. The band began to tour full-time, beginning with a Canadian tour in June 2002, followed by an American tour with Prevent Falls, Garrison and Clark, from June–July 2002. During this tour, As Friends Rust played Krazy Fest 5 in Louisville, Kentucky, and three Van's Warped Tour dates in Los Angeles and San Francisco, California. Upon returning home in late July 2002, Beckham quit the band. As Friends Rust travelled as a four-piece, with Simmons as sole guitarist, for another European and British tour from August–September 2002, supported by The Copperpot Journals on its United Kingdom leg. The tour included dates at the Defiance Records Festival in Cologne, Germany, the Sommerspektakel Open Air Festival in Sarstedt, Germany and Ieperfest in Ypres, Belgium. Prior to leaving for Europe, the band had already discussed abandoning the name As Friends Rust in favor of one that better reflected its new musical direction. It was while on this European and British tour that announcements were made to fans that this would be As Friends Rust's final tour, and that the band would be officially changing its name to Salem upon returning home.

=== Salem (2002–2004) ===
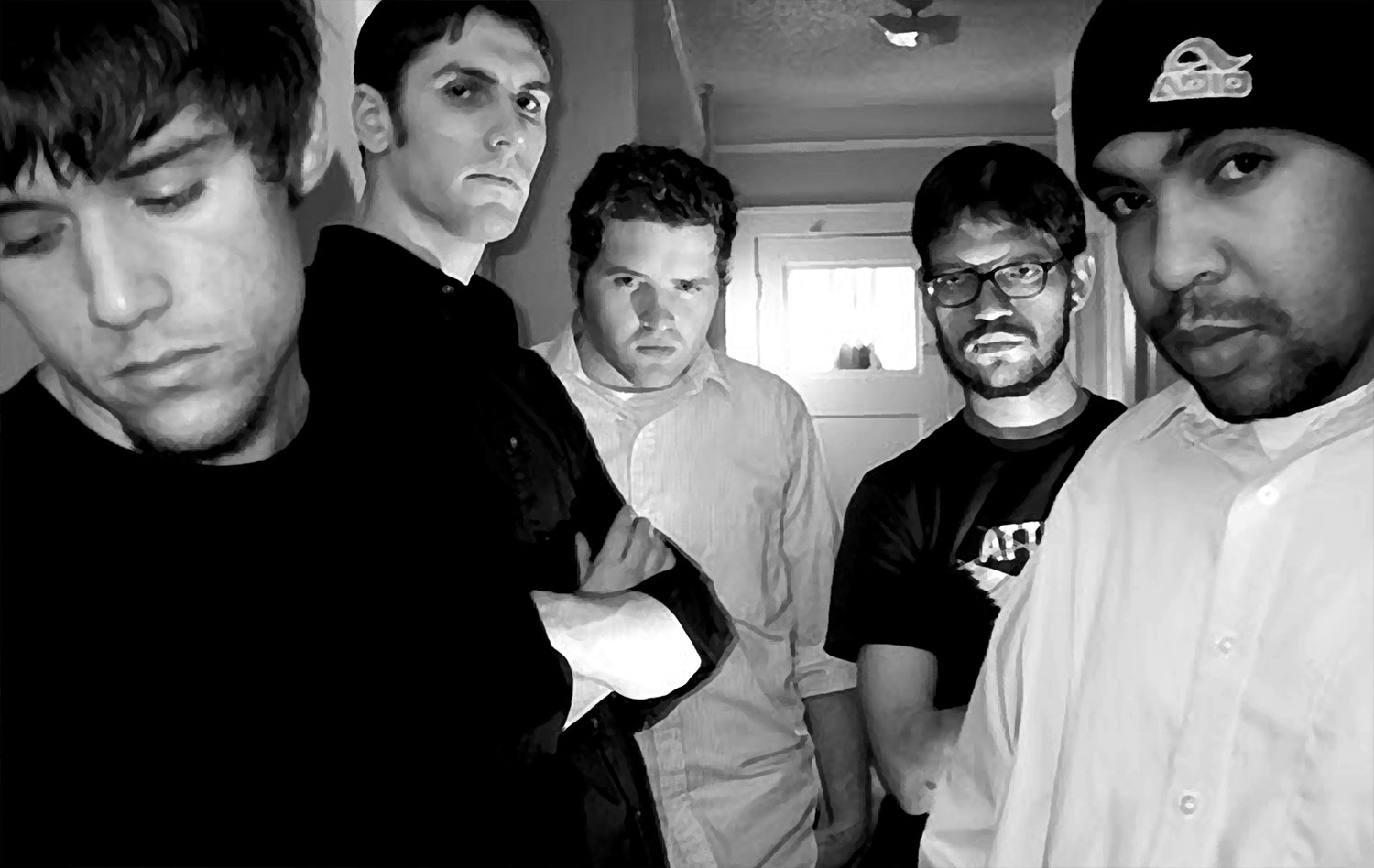
Salem in a promotional photo shoot in 2003. From left to right: David Miller, Adam D'Zurilla, Thomas Rankine, Jeremy Robertson and Simmons.

Although As Friends Rust officially played its last show on September 11, 2002, in Amsterdam, Netherlands, the band would continue to be billed under its old name, as additional tours had been booked well-in-advance for the remainder of 2002. As such, Salem continued to play As Friends Rust songs and tour in promotion of Won and A Young Trophy Band in the Parlance of Our Times for several more months. Back in the United States, Salem recruited guitarist Jeremy Robertson, who had played in Die Tomorrow with D'Zurilla. The band was then supposed to go on tour with Florida emo band The Remedy Session, from September–October 2002, but the tour was cancelled.

Salem officially played its first show on September 28, 2002, at The Factory in Fort Lauderdale, Florida, opening for Further Seems Forever, though the band was billed as As Friends Rust. Salem was again billed as As Friends Rust during its next two tours in October 2002, the first with Fairweather, Liars Academy, Open Hand and Codeseven, and the second with Shelter, Keepsake and Running from Dharma. It was only once Salem began touring with The Movielife, Brand New and The Reunion Show in late October 2002 that the previously booked billing was corrected to feature the band's new name. Upon returning home from this tour in mid-November 2002, Swain quit the band and was replaced by David Miller, who had also played in Die Tomorrow with D'Zurilla and Robertson, and had just finished a stint with Glasseater.

In December 2002, Salem was supposed to tour with Digger, but it was cancelled; instead the band performed at Gainesvillefest in Gainesville, Florida and at the South West Florida Winter Music and Skate Festival in Naples, Florida. In January 2003, the band toured with Finch, From Autumn to Ashes, Steel Train and Allister. In February 2003, the band toured with Further Seems Forever, Elliott and The Early November, and then with Unsung Zeros and Punchline. Salem performed at the Skate and Surf Festival in Asbury Park, New Jersey on April 27, 2003, and at the Orlando Magic Festival in Orlando, Florida on June 14, 2003. This was followed by four dates as part of Van's Warped Tour in July 2003 throughout Florida.

During the summer of 2003, Salem recorded its debut extended play, Love It or Leave Me, with producer Beau Burchell, which was released on October 28, 2003, through Fiddler Records and Geffen Records. A music video was produced for the single "Smoke & Mirrors" by director Jason Page. The band then embarked on a tour with The Remedy Session in August 2003, and performed at the Go Time Festival in Merritt Island, Florida on August 16, 2003. In October and November 2003, the band embarked on tours with Poulain, Tora! Tora! Torrance!, The A.K.A.s, Sadaharu and The Big Collapse, in addition to performing at The Fest II in Gainesville, Florida, CMJ Music Marathon in Tribeca, New York, and Friction Fest in Greensboro, North Carolina.

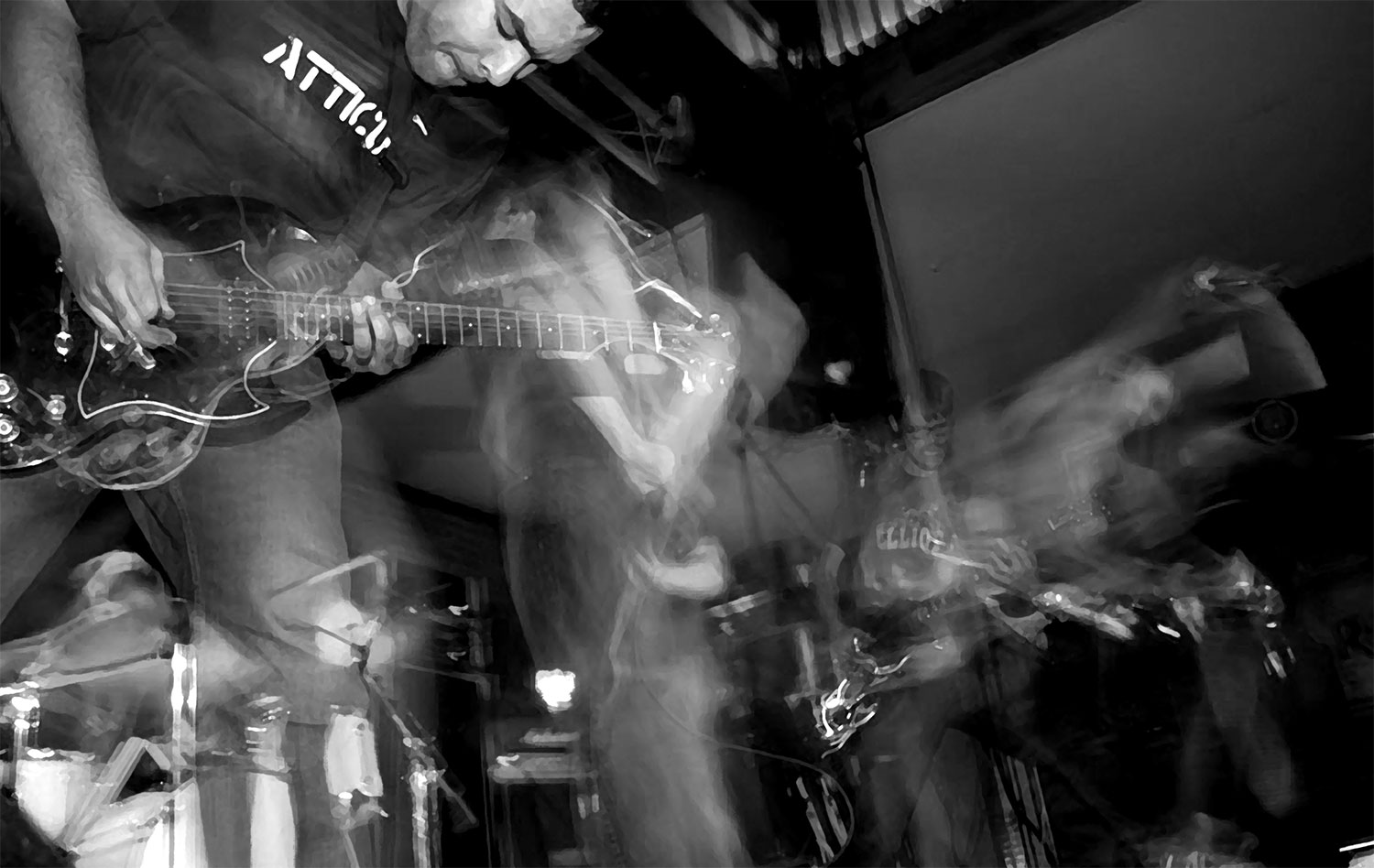
Simmons (left) performing with Salem in Gainesville, Florida in 2003.

Salem toured with The Bled and The Hope Conspiracy in March 2004, and with Running from Dharma and Believe in Toledo in April 2004, including a performance at Henderfest in Lewisburg, Pennsylvania. Simmons was, however, unable to tour during this time and was replaced temporarily by David McNally. With Simmons available again, Salem continued touring with From First to Last, Underoath, Sincebyman, Name Taken, Scatter the Ashes and The Bled April–May 2004, including a performance at A Day in the Park Festival in Poughkeepsie, New York, and with Autopilot Off, Riddlin' Kids, Jersey, A Second Chance May–June 2004. This was followed by a tour with Further Seems Forever, Brandtson and The Kicks, spanning August–September 2004.

The band was next booked for a tour of the United Kingdom, spanning September–October 2004, with Johnny Truant, in promotion of Love It or Leave Me's British release, licensed through Sorepoint Records/Eat Sleep Records, due out October 4, 2004. In promotion of the British tour, Undergroove Records released a split 7-inch vinyl featuring one song each from Salem and Johnny Truant. However, Salem was forced to cancel its British tour when Simmons quit the band on the way to the airport. Salem was replaced by Hondo McLean on the tour. David McNally, having previously filled in for Simmons earlier that year, officially joined Salem as its new guitarist.

=== Sound Study Recordings and brewing companies (2007–present) ===
From 2007 to 2013, Simmons was the co-owner of the independent record label Sound Study Recordings, which he co-founded with former Bird of Ill Omen, As Friends Rust and Salem band-mate Thomas Rankine and recording engineer Matthew Finch. The record label released music from such artists as Burning Love, Chris Wollard and the Ship Thieves, Comadre, Coliseum, Off with Their Heads and Ruiner.

Outside of the music industry, Simmons works in the brewing industry, having held the position of head brewer at Swamp Head Brewery and First Magnitude Brewing Company, both based in Gainesville, Florida. In 2019, he and partner Matthew Juaire opened their own brewery, Bay Cannon Beer Company, in Tampa, Florida. The Bay Cannon Beer Company temporarily closed its doors on December 4, 2022, following a shooting that took place across the street; the brewery's outside walls, windows, and refrigerators were hit by bullets. After remaining closed for several months due to a rise in crime in the area, the Bay Cannon Beer Company permanently closed on May 3, 2023.

=== As Friends Rust reunion and Rot in Coffins (2008–present) ===
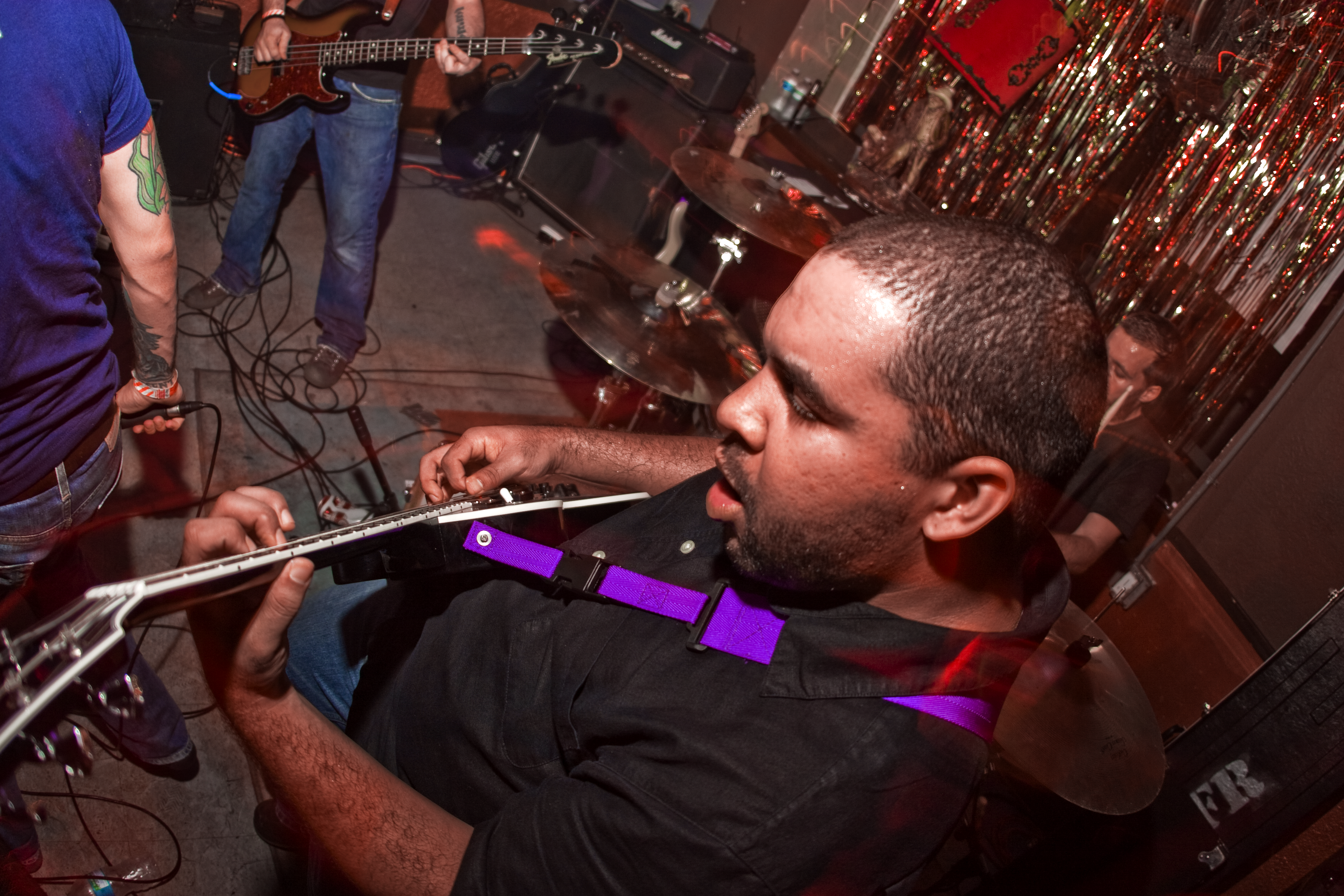
Simmons performing with As Friends Rust at the band's first reunion show on August 15, 2008, at The Atlantic in Gainesville, Florida.

Simmons rejoined As Friends Rust in March 2008, when vocalist Damien Moyal announced that the band would reunite for a series of European and British shows scheduled for August 2008. It was further revealed that the band would be performing with its 1998–2000 line-up (referred to as "The Porch Days" line-up), also including Timothy Kirkpatrick, Kaleb Stewart and James Glayat. The Back in Coffee Black Tour '08 kicked off with a single American show at The Atlantic in Gainesville, Florida, followed by six shows in Europe and Britain. As Friends Rust recorded demos of new songs in June 2011, but the band was not satisfied with the result and shelved the material.

In June 2014, As Friends Rust travelled to Asia for the Japan Tour 2014, supported by Japanese hardcore bands Endzweck, Noy and Nervous Light of Sunday, though Kirkpatrick was unable to attend and was temporarily replaced by former Culture drummer Joshua Williams. In promotion of the tour, Japanese record label Cosmic Note released the best-of compilation album Greatest Hits? on June 4, 2014, which included a selection of the band's recordings from 1996 to 2002. The compilation was re-issued by Indonesian record label D'Kolektif on December 27, 2014, and Dutch record label Shield Recordings on April 29, 2015.

On May 22, 2015, German record label Demons Run Amok Entertainment released The Porch Days: 1998 to 2000 on 12-inch vinyl. The release compiled all of the band's studio recordings from 1998 to 2000, as well as previously unreleased live recordings of two of the three songs composed-but-never-properly-recorded by the band with that line-up. To support the release, As Friends Rust played three shows in 2015: one at Saint Vitus in Brooklyn, New York, a second at Groezrock festival in Meerhout, Belgium, and a third The Wooly as part of The Fest 14 in Gainesville, Florida.

In 2017, during As Friends Rust's down-time, Simmons formed the black metal band Rot in Coffins. The band also includes vocalist John Hope (formerly of Ceremonial Hammer and currently of Stunner), bass guitarist Michael Lipscomb (formerly of The Yams and Orbiter) and drummer Dennis Bickart (formerly of Fastplant and Broken Things). The band released an eponymous extended play in March 2018.

In 2018, As Friends Rust announced that it was actively writing and demoing new songs for a planned second full-length album. The band revealed that it would be recording and releasing a two-song extended play in mid-2019 (though this was ultimately delayed by a year), as a precursor to the band's sophomore album. The band played three shows in 2019: one at The Kingsland in Brooklyn, New York, and two on the same day at Molotow in Hamburg, Germany as part of the Booze Cruise Festival. Upon returning from Booze Cruise, As Friends Rust parted ways with bass guitarist Stewart, though the band did not immediately look for a replacement bass guitarist.

As Friends Rust recorded two songs for its comeback extended play, Up from the Muck, in early March 2020. The recording sessions were tracked individually at various studios in Florida and New York, then mixed by James Paul Wisner at Wisner Productions in St. Cloud, Florida. Up from the Muck was released by Unity Worldwide Records on July 3, 2020. In September 2022, the band played at Furnace Fest in Birmingham, Alabama, with former Culture guitarist Richard Thurston filling in on drums and Simmons' Rot in Coffins band-mate Michael Lipscomb filling in on bass guitar. The band still working on its planned second full-length album.
