= A Young Trophy Band in the Parlance of Our Times =

EP by As Friends Rust
- Released: May 27, 2002 (Europe); May 28, 2002 (U.S)
- Recorded: February 2002
- Studios: Wisner Productions, Davie, Florida
- Genres: Melodic hardcore; emotional hardcore; punk rock
- Length: 19:19
- Labels: Equal Vision; Defiance
- Producers: James Paul Wisner; As Friends Rust; Damien Moyal

As Friends Rust chronology
Won (2001)	A Young Trophy Band in the Parlance of Our Times (2002)	Camden Underworld, London – 16 November 2001 (2002)

A Young Trophy Band in the Parlance of Our Times is the third extended play by American melodic hardcore band As Friends Rust. It was released on compact disc and 12" vinyl by American record label Equal Vision Records on May 28, 2002. German record label Defiance Records licensed the rights to the extended play for the European market, though these compact disc and 12" vinyl editions were released a day earlier than the American one, on May 27, 2002.

In promotion of the release, As Friends Rust toured the United States, Canada, United Kingdom and Europe several times between March and November 2002, accompanied by such bands as Brand New, Coheed and Cambria, Thursday, Sick of It All, The Movielife, Shai Hulud, Planes Mistaken for Stars, Open Hand, Shelter, Keepsake, Hotwire, Fairweather, The Sainte Catherines, This Day Forward, Bloodlet, The Reunion Show, The Stryder, Liars Academy, Running from Dharma, Prevent Falls, The Remedy Session, and The Copperpot Journals. The band also performed at notable festivals like Van's Warped Tour in Los Angeles and San Francisco, California, Krazy Fest in Louisville, Kentucky, Hell City Tattoo Festival in Columbus, Ohio, Gorefest in Miami, Florida, Chaos Days Festival in Savannah, Georgia, Ieperfest in Ypres, Belgium, Defiance Festival in Köln, Germany, Mondsee Open Air Festival in Hohenmölsen, Germany, Nordhausen Festival in Nordhausen, Germany, and Sommerspektakel Open Air Festival in Sarstedt, Germany.

The band went through extensive line-up changes following A Young Trophy Band in the Parlance of Our Times' recording sessions and ensuing promotional tours. The extended play was written and recorded with lead vocalist Damien Moyal, guitarists Joseph Simmons and Christopher "Floyd" Beckham, drummer Zachary Swain, and bass guitarist Thomas Rankine. Moyal quit the band less than two weeks after the recording sessions, forcing Beckham to step up as lead vocalist and former member Gordon Tarpley to return as fill-in guitarist for a month's worth of shows, before As Friends Rust had a chance to recruit new vocalist Adam D'Zurilla. Four months later, Beckham also departed. After completing a European and British tour as a four-piece, and fulfilling most of its contractual obligations to the many record labels to which the band was signed, the remaining members of As Friends Rust decided to change the band's name to Salem in September 2002. Salem continued to tour in promotion of the release for two more months before focusing on new material.

== Composition and recording ==
Before beginning work on its first full-length album Won in early 2001, As Friends Rust went through major line-up changes in late 2000. The band had previously released three extended plays; The Fists of Time, a split with Discount (both in 1998) and As Friends Rust (in 1999), and had been touring in promotion of that material since June 1998. As Friends Rust had hoped to record a full-length album in late 1999 or early 2000, but was unable to compose enough new material. Prior to leaving on a European and British tour in September 2000, guitarist James Glayat and drummer Timothy Kirkpatrick announced their desire to leave the band upon returning home. However, tensions during the tour ultimately caused a much bigger change in membership, so much so that the future of As Friends Rust was questioned.

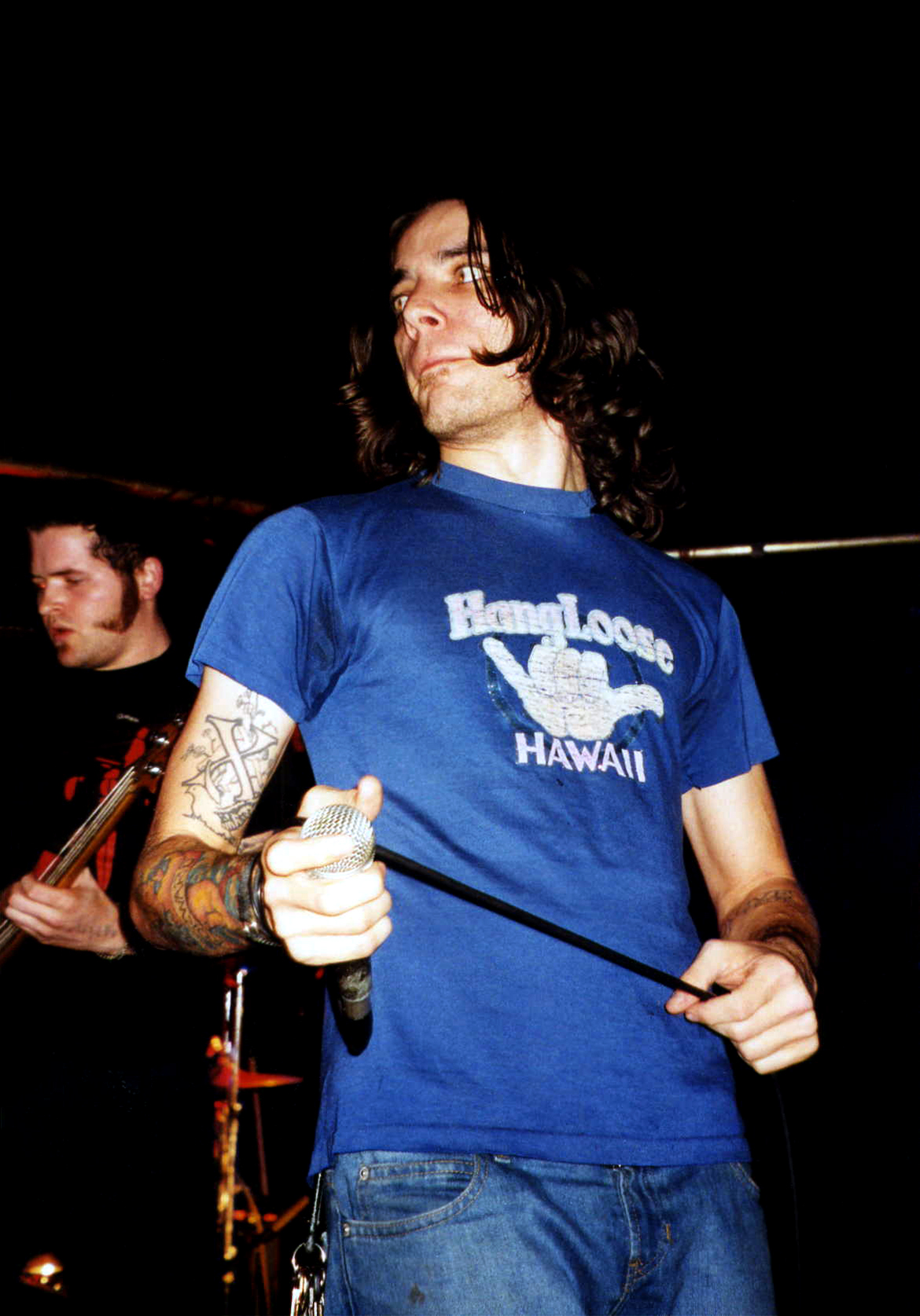
As Friends Rust performing at Underground in Cologne, Germany in promotion of Won on November 4, 2001. From left to right: Thomas Rankine and Damien Moyal.

Ex-As Friends Rust guitarist Peter Bartsocas was visiting Europe at the same time and decided to travel with the band. When Glayat injured his leg during the first week of the tour and flew home early, Bartsocas filled the vacant guitarist position. Several shows later, lead vocalist Damien Moyal lost his voice, leading bass guitarist and backing vocalist Kaleb Stewart to take up lead vocals, and in turn Bartsocas temporarily filled in as bass guitarist. Moyal and guitarist Joseph Simmons called Christopher "Floyd" Beckham (Glayat's at-the-time roommate, and an ex-member of Morning Again, Culture and Crucible) from Europe, asking him to join As Friends Rust as its new guitarist upon returning home, much to Stewart's dismay, leading the latter to quit the band. Moyal and Stewart were initially to stay over in Europe following As Friends Rust's tour, for a second tour with their other band Bridgeburne R, but Moyal was forced to find a new bass guitarist for both bands, as well as a new drummer for As Friends Rust. Due to its membership changes, As Friends Rust had to pull out of playing Gainesvillefest in December 2000.

The band briefly considered becoming a four-piece, with Simmons as sole guitarist and Beckham as bass guitarist (finding it easier to fill a single missing member on drums), and shortening the band's name to The Rust. By early 2001, the band was actively writing material for its planned first full-length album, as part of its existing three-release recording contract with Doghouse Records. The Doghouse Records contract called for one extended play (used up with As Friends Rust) and two full-length albums; The Fists of Time: An Anthology of Short Fiction and Non-Fiction was a reissue of previously recorded material and did not count towards the contract.

Moyal, Simmons and Beckham then recruited drummer Alexander Vernon (formerly of Twelve Tribes) and bass guitarist Guillermo Amador (with Beckham returning to guitar). Further line-up changes resulted with Zachary Swain (formerly of Rosalind, Adversary and Carlisle) replacing Vernon on drums in March 2001, and Thomas Rankine (formerly of Crestfallen, Bird of Ill Omen, Dead Men's Theory, Anchorman and Crucible) replacing Amador on bass in April 2001.

Before completing work on Won for Doghouse Records, As Friends Rust was approached by American record label Equal Visions Records in April 2001. The band managed to sign a one-off extended play deal through a loan-out from Doghouse Records. As Friends Rust's extended play for Equal Vision Records was originally to include five songs: three new songs, a re-recording of "The First Song on the Tape You Make Her", and a cover song. The release of the extended play was first scheduled for October 2001, as at the time, Won was planned for release in August 2001. The release of the extended play was delayed as the band focused on completing Won in 2001 and touring in the United States, Europe and United Kingdom.

Work on As Friends Rust's extended play for Equal Vision Records resumed once the band returned from a three-week tour of the United States' East Coast and Midwest with Coral Springs, Florida-based emo band Keepsake and Pompano Beach, Florida-based emo band Further Seems Forever, which had spanned from August 23 to September 15, 2001. As Friends Rust then dedicated its time from mid-September to late October 2001 to composing new songs for the extended play, with plans to record the material in December 2001 and for a release date set in March 2002.

Composing was halted when As Friends Rust embarked on a five-week European and British tour with Richmond, Virginia-based punk rock band Strike Anywhere and Peoria, Illinois-based post-hardcore band Planes Mistaken for Stars. The tour spanned from October 29 to December 5, 2001, and included a highlight performance at London, England's Camden Underworld, which was filmed and later released on video and DVD by British home video company Punkervision in December 2002.

A Japanese and Australian tour had been proposed for early 2002, but the band instead took three months off from touring, spending December 2001 and January 2002 polishing five new songs, which were to be recorded for Equal Vision Records' extended play, newly titled A Young Trophy Band in the Parlance of Our Times. The title of the release was a play on a line of dialog from the film The Big Lebowski, in which Jeff Bridges delivers "a young trophy wife, in the parlance of our times".

The extended play was recorded during one week in mid-February 2002, with producer James Paul Wisner at his studio, Wisner Productions, in Davie, Florida. The band had previously recorded with Wisner twice; once in November 1996 for its demo, and again in July 2001 for Won. The material recorded for A Young Trophy Band in the Parlance of Our Times differed slightly from what was originally announced ten months prior. Instead of only three new songs, five were tracked: "More Than Just Music, It's a Hairstyle", "The Most Americanest", "Temporary Living", "Born With a Silver Spoon Up Your Ass", and "Where the Wild Things Were".

Tension within the band resulted with Moyal recording his vocals separately and co-producing the material without the other four members' presence. It was the first As Friends Rust recording, since the band's demo in 1996, to solely feature Moyal on both lead and backing vocals. Moyal also recorded guitar for an additional solo piece during the session, "Up and Went", (a precursor to Damien Done) with Wisner contributing additional guitar and synthesizer, and the two of them edited a 30-second joke track to place as a hidden song at the end of the extended play.

A week following the recording session, Moyal quit As Friends Rust, citing dissatisfaction with touring and wanting to focus on school and his then-girlfriend. In retrospective interviews, Moyal stated that the new members, Beckham, Swain and Rankine, were taking As Friends Rust in a more mainstream and polished direction, which in turn led to his loss of interest. In an interview conducted shortly after Moyal's departure, Rankine revealed that frictions with the vocalist had become increasingly problematic, especially since the band's recent European and British tour in October–December 2001. Rankine pointed out that Moyal's attitude had been negative and holding back the band from progressing in a natural direction, and that by leaving suddenly, he had left the band in a difficult situation with record label and touring obligations to fulfill. Moyal, nevertheless, encouraged the band to find a new vocalist and continue under the established name. Moyal went on to form Damien Done, a solo project which eventually expanded into a full band.

== Release and packaging ==
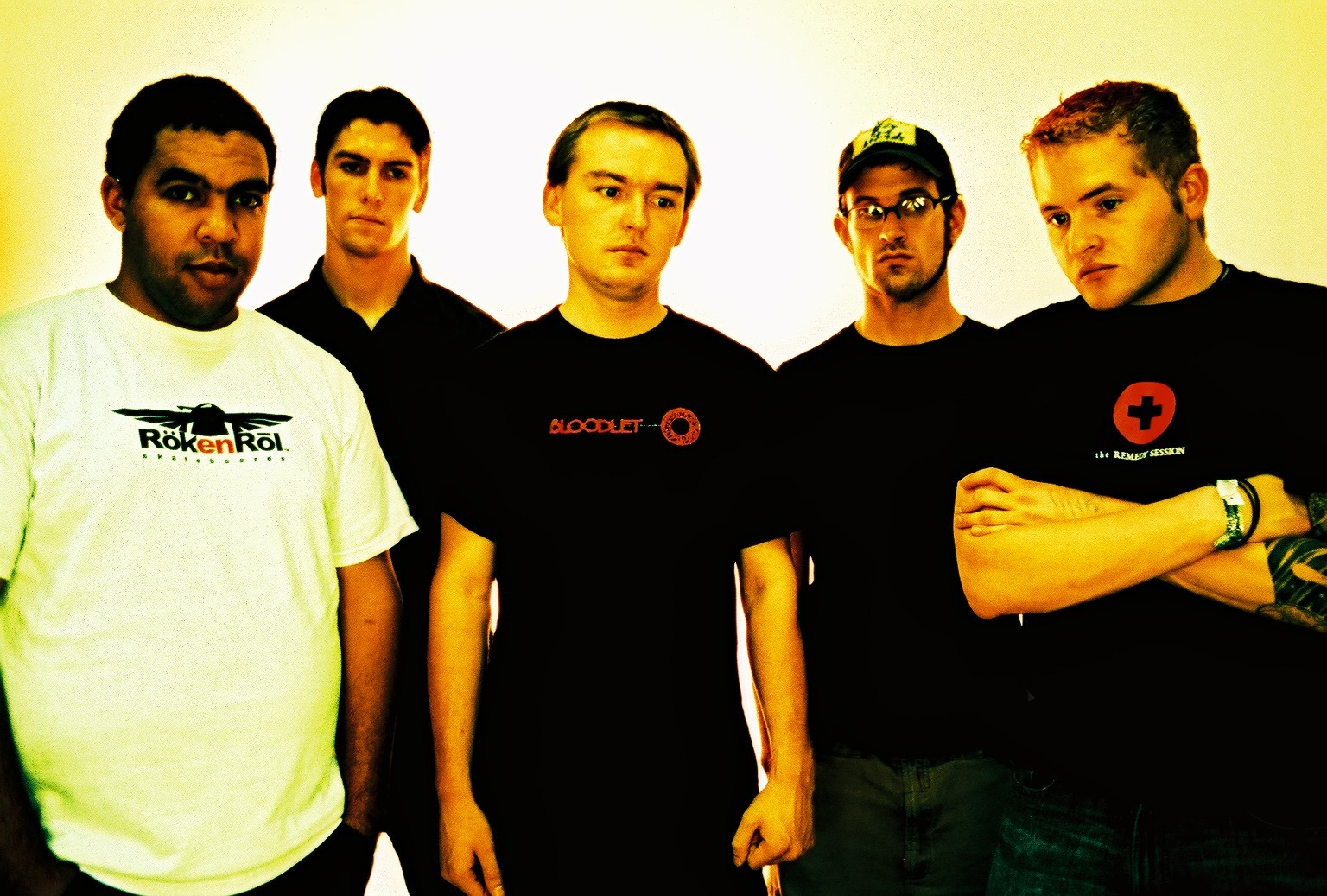
Publicity picture of As Friends Rust circa May 2002, in promotion of A Young Trophy Band in the Parlance of Our Times. From left to right: Joseph Simmons, Adam D'Zurilla, Zachary Swain, Christopher Beckham and Thomas Rankine.

The artwork and layout for A Young Trophy Band in the Parlance of Our Times was designed and constructed by Moyal and frequent visual collaborator Jason Page (who had worked on As Friends Rust, The Fists of Time: An anthology of Short Fiction and Non-Fiction and Won). The cover art's main photograph was taken by Sarah Prieres. Due to contractual obligations, the band was required to include "As Friends Rust appears courtesy of Doghouse Records" in the booklet.

Equal Vision Records released A Young Trophy Band in the Parlance of Our Times on compact disc and 12" vinyl on May 28, 2002. German record label Defiance Records, which had previously released Won on compact disc and 12" vinyl for the European market, licensed the rights to the extended play through an existing deal with Doghouse Records. Defiance Records' compact disc and 12" vinyl editions were released a day earlier than the American one, on May 27, 2002.

== Promotion ==
At the time of Moyal's departure in late February 2002, As Friends Rust already had several upcoming shows scheduled and was in the midst of booking an entire year's worth of tours around the globe to fulfill its touring obligations to Doghouse Records, Defiance Records, Howling Bull Entertainment and Equal Vision Records in promotion of both Won and the forthcoming A Young Trophy Band in the Parlance of Our Times. The band was also talking about writing a second full-length album and was being courted by larger record labels. Beckham initially stepped up as temporary lead vocalist, and former As Friends Rust guitarist Gordon Tarpley returned to fill the vacant guitarist position, as the band embarked on a short American Midwest tour supporting Sick of It All, Shai Hulud and Thursday during the first week of March 2002. This was immediately followed by a week-long American East Coast tour with Coheed and Cambria, The Stryder, Fairweather, Liars Academy, This Day Forward and Prevent Falls, which spanned from March 4–12, 2002, as part of the Equal Vision Records Presents: Spring Showcase 2002 Tour, and a one-off date opening for Agnostic Front in New York. On the way back to Florida, the band stopped to perform at the Chaos Days Festival in Savannah, Georgia on March 15, 2002.

Adam D'Zurilla (formerly of Short Order, Esteem, Die Tomorrow and Kumité) was finally welcomed as Moyal's replacement in late March 2002, allowing Beckham to return to playing guitar. D'Zurilla's first show was at the Hell City Tattoo Festival in Columbus, Ohio on April 5, 2002. As Friends Rust next embarked on a week-long American East Coast tour with Orlando, Florida-based metalcore band Bloodlet and California-based alternative metal band Hotwire, spanning from April 11–19, 2002, and on the way back stopped to play at Gorefest in Miami, Florida. A couple weeks' worth of shows were planned for mid-May 2002 with Gainesville punk rock band House on Fire and Texas emo band Pop Unknown, but most of the dates fell through and As Friends Rust ended up playing a series of one-off shows across the Southern United States. At the end of May 2002, As Friends Rust played a week's worth of Florida shows with New Jersey post-hardcore band Prevent Falls and Georgia melodic punk rock band Whippersnapper.

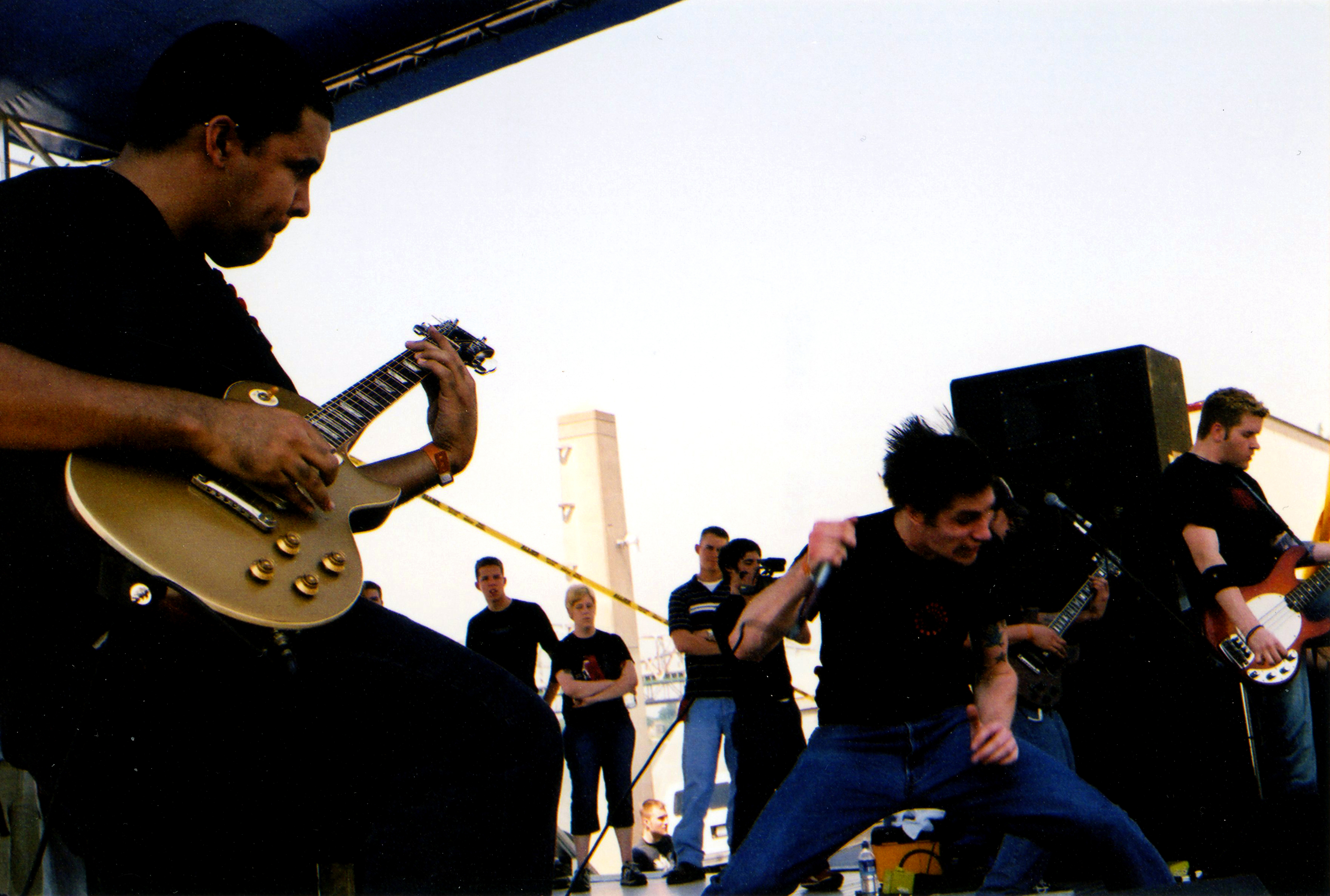
As Friends Rust performing at Krazy Fest 5 in Louisville, Kentucky on June 22, 2002. From left to right: Joseph Simmons, Adam D'Zurilla, Christopher Beckham and Thomas Rankine.

As Friends Rust played in Canada for the first time during a two-week tour that spanned from May 28 to June 9, 2002. The entire tour was originally to be shared with Montreal, Quebec-based punk rock band The Sainte Catherines, and covered nearly all of the country, but due to last minute changes, As Friends Rust ended up playing mostly newly booked shows restricted to Quebec and Ontario. The Canadian tour was immediately followed by a full-scale, month-and-a-half-long American tour, accompanied once again by Prevent Falls. Boston, Massachusetts-based post-hardcore band Garrison and South Bend, Indiana-based hardcore band Clark joined select legs of the tour. The tour included a show in nearly every State, and spanned from June 12 to July 28, 2002, during which time As Friends Rust had the opportunity to play Krazy Fest 5 in Louisville, Kentucky, and three Van's Warped Tour dates in Los Angeles and San Francisco, California. Upon returning home in late July 2002, Beckham quit the band.

As Friends Rust travelled as a four-piece, with Simmons as sole guitarist, for its month-long tour of Europe and the United Kingdom, which spanned from August 8 to September 11, 2002. The tour included stops to play the Defiance Festival in Cologne, Germany, the Sommerspektakel Open Air Festival in Sarstedt, Germany and Ieperfest in Ypres, Belgium. As Friends Rust was supported by British pop punk band The Copperpot Journals on its ten-date United Kingdom leg.

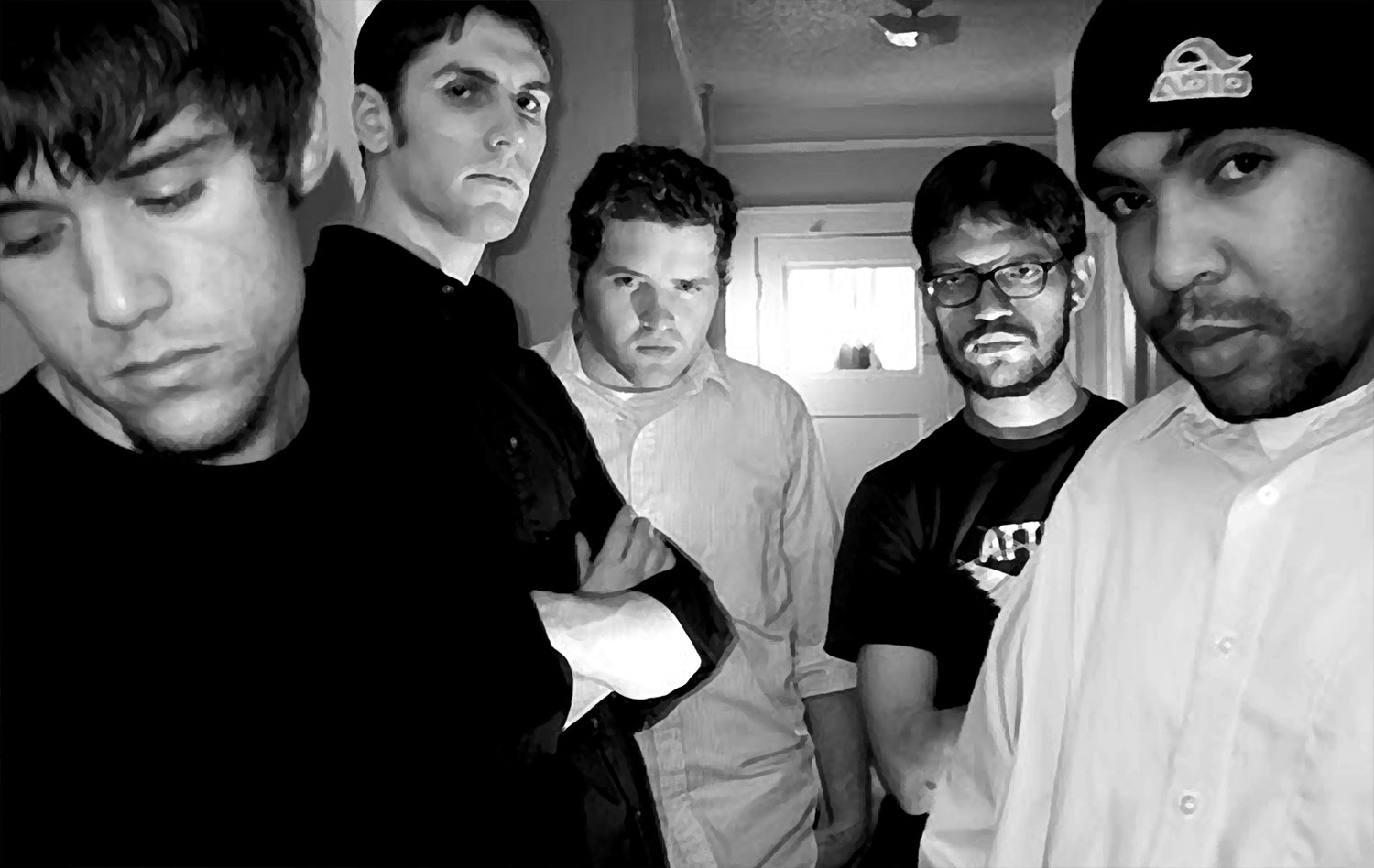
Publicity picture of Salem in 2003. From left to right: David Miller, Adam D'Zurilla, Thomas Rankine, Jeremy Robertson and Joseph Simmons.

Prior to leaving for Europe, the band had already discussed abandoning the name As Friends Rust in favor of one that better reflected its new musical direction. It was while on this European and British tour that announcements were made to fans that this would be As Friends Rust's final tour, and that the band would be officially changing its name to Salem upon returning home. Although As Friends Rust officially played its last show on September 11, 2002, in Amsterdam, Netherlands, the band would continue to be billed under its old name as additional tours had been booked well-in-advance for the remainder of 2002. As such, Salem continued to play As Friends Rust songs and tour in promotion of Won and A Young Trophy Band in the Parlance of Our Times for several more months.

Back in the United States, the band was supposed to go on tour with Florida emo group The Remedy Session, from mid-September to early October 2002, but the tour was cancelled. Salem officially played its first show on September 28, 2002, at The Factory in Fort Lauderdale, Florida, opening for Further Seems Forever, though the band was billed as As Friends Rust. Salem was again billed as As Friends Rust during a tour with Fairweather, Liars Academy, Open Hand and Codeseven, and another with Shelter, Keepsake and Running from Dharma, which both covered the South Eastern United States and together spanned from October 7–21, 2002. It was only once touring began with The Movielife, Brand New and The Reunion Show, which spanned from October 28 to November 16, 2002, across the United States, that the previously booked billing was corrected to feature the band's new name. Upon returning home from this tour, Swain quit the band and Salem properly began moving on to new things away from As Friends Rust.

== Critical reception ==
Professional ratings
Review scores
Source	Rating
AllMusic	4/5 stars
Allschools Network	9/10 stars
Bleeding Heroes	9.5/10 stars
Exclaim!	Positive
IMPACT Press	Positive
Modern Fix	Positive
Ox-Fanzine	Mixed
Punk Planet	Positive
Salt Lake Under Ground	Positive
Still Holding On!	5/5 stars

A Young Trophy Band in the Parlance of Our Times received mostly positive critical acclaim upon release. As Friends Rust's style was described by most critics as more punk rock and less hardcore than previous releases, also bordering on mainstream rock and pop rock. Nevertheless, the band was still categorized as a melodic hardcore, emotional hardcore, punk rock, and post-hardcore band. Some critics also heard elements of rap or rap metal beginning to seep in.

Unlike with the band's past releases, reviewers less often compared them to other bands and pointed out that As Friends Rust had developed and matured, refining a sound of its own. Critics noted that A Young Trophy Band in the Parlance of Our Times showcased the band at its peak, continuing a progression and evolution from Won. Comparisons were still drawn to Hot Water Music, Avail, Alkaline Trio, Dag Nasty, Henry Rollins, Glenn Danzig, Less Than Jake, Reach the Sky, Good Clean Fun, The Mighty Mighty Bosstones, Thursday, At the Drive-In, Saves the Day, and Strike Anywhere, along with perceived elements of Sisters of Mercy, Pink Floyd, Type O Negative, and Dinosaur Jr.

The music on A Young Trophy Band in the Parlance of Our Times was described as radio-friendly, melodic, energetic, catchy, driving, and poppy. The six songs were praised as innovative and unique, having clever tempo changes, and for being different from each other. Wisner's production was also praised, as it had been on Won.

Moyal's vocals on the extended play were also singled out by many critics who admired his ability to sing and scream with equal dexterity. His vocals were noted as smoother, less raspy, and deeper than on earlier releases. His lyrics were lauded as profound, clever, deep, coherent, well-thought out, having a strong message, and suggested as well-worth reading.

== Track listing ==
All lyrics written by Moyal. All music written by Simmons, Beckham, Swain and Rankine, except where noted. Credits are adapted from the EP's liner notes.

No.	Title	Music	Length
1.	"More Than Just Music, It's a Hairstyle"		3:11
2.	"The Most Americanest"		3:06
3.	"Temporary Living"		4:14
4.	"Born With a Silver Spoon Up Your Ass"		3:01
5.	"Up and Went"	Moyal	0:47
6.	"Where the Wild Things Were"		5:01
Total length:			19:19

== Personnel ==
Credits are adapted from the EP's liner notes.

As Friends Rust

- Damien Moyal – lead and backing vocals, guitar on "Up and Went"
- Joseph Simmons – guitar
- Christopher Beckham – guitar
- Thomas Rankine – bass guitar
- Zachary Swain – drums

Guest musicians

- James Paul Wisner – additional guitar and synthesizer on "Up and Went"

Production

- James Paul Wisner – recording engineer, mixer and producer at Wisner Productions
- As Friends Rust – co-producer
- Damien Moyal – co-producer, design and layout
- Jason Page – design, layout and construction
- Sarah Prieres – photography

== Release history ==
Release formats for A Young Trophy Band in the Parlance of Our Times
Region	Date	Label	Format	Catalog
Germany	May 27, 2002	Defiance Records	CD	XXXIII
Germany	May 27, 2002	Defiance Records	LP	XXXIII
United States	May 28, 2002	Equal Vision Records	CD	EVR071
United States	May 28, 2002	Equal Vision Records	LP	EVR071
