= Scifentology II =

Studio album by Yak Ballz
- Released: January 29, 2008
- Studio: S.T.F.U. Studios (Hoboken, NJ); The Crib Piece Studios; Gotham Studios (New York, NY)
- Genre: Hip hop
- Length: 51:16
- Label: FloSpot
- Producer: Adept; Aesop Rock; Camu Tao; Chapter 7; Chris Maestro; Govone; Mondee

Yak Ballz chronology
Scifentology (2006)	Scifentology II (2008)	Gas Galaxy (2012)

Professional ratings
Review scores
Source	Rating
HipHopDX	3/5
PopMatters	6/10

Scifentology II is the second full-length studio album by American rapper Yak Ballz. It was released on January 29, 2008, via FloSpot Records. Recording sessions took place at S.T.F.U. Studios in Hoboken, The Crib Piece Studios, and Gotham Studios in New York City. Production was handled by Chapter 7, Mondee, Camu Tao, Adept, Aesop Rock, Chris Maestro and Govone. It features guest appearances from Cage, Peter Toh, Slow Suicide Stimulus, Tame One and Thomas Phenomas.

== Track listing ==
No.	Title	Writer(s)	Producer(s)	Length
1.	"Blind Faith"	Yashar Zadeh; Adam Polc	Adept	4:42
2.	"YBTV"	Zadeh; Armando Torres	Mondee	3:38
3.	"Out of Range"	Zadeh; Tero Smith	Camu Tao	3:20
4.	"Nuclear Society" (featuring Tame One)	Zadeh; Rahem Ross Brown; Mike Desino	Chapter 7	3:45
5.	"War in My Head"	Zadeh; Torres	Mondee	5:14
6.	"Dirt Empire"	Zadeh; Ian Bavitz	Aesop Rock	3:54
7.	"Future Deluxe" (featuring Slow Suicide Stimulus)	Zadeh; Charles Zaffarese; Gary Falcone	Govone	4:01
8.	"A Billion Ways" (featuring Peter Toh)	Zadeh; Peter Toh; Torres	Mondee	4:00
9.	"Chaching (Clap Your Hands)"	Zadeh; Desino	Chapter 7	3:19
10.	"Taking Good Care" (featuring Thomas Phenomas)	Zadeh; Smith; Zaffarese	Camu Tao	3:36
11.	"Underrated"	Zadeh; Christopher Gheeron	Chris Maestro	3:55
12.	"New Communications" (featuring Cage)	Zadeh; Chris Palko; Desino	Chapter 7	4:17
13.	"Trust Is a Timebomb"	Zadeh; Desino	Chapter 7	3:35
Total length:				51:16

== Personnel ==
- Yashar "Yak Ballz" Zadeh – vocals, executive producer
- Rahem Ross "Tame One" Brown – vocals (track 4)
- Charles "Charlie Chan" Zaffarese – vocals (track 7), additional vocals (track 11), additional programming (tracks: 3, 4, 10, 12, 13), executive producer
- Peter Toh – vocals (track 8)
- Thomas "Phenomas" Haehnel – vocals (track 10), additional keyboards (track 12)
- Chris "Cage" Palko – vocals (track 12)
- Malachi De Lorenzo – additional vocals (track 5), bass (track 8)
- Gary "Govone" Falcone – additional vocals (track 11), producer (track 7)
- Melvin "DJ Melski" Alston Jr. – scratches (tracks: 3, 12)
- DJ Big Wiz – scratches (track 4)
- Adam "Adept" Polc – producer (track 1)
- Armando "Mondee" Torres – producer (tracks: 2, 5, 8)
- Tero "Camu Tao" Smith – producer (tracks: 3, 10)
- Mike "Chapter 7" DeSino – producer (tracks: 4, 9, 12, 13)
- Ian "Aesop Rock" Bavitz – producer (track 6)
- Christopher "Chris Maestro" Gheeron – producer (track 11)
- Joey Raia – mixing
- Ken Heitmueller – mastering
- Ewok One 5MH – artwork, layout
