= Stumpknocker =

Stumpknocker may refer to:

- One of various edible freshwater fish, especially the spotted sunfish or redspotted sunfish
- Stump Knocker Pale Ale, produced by Swamp Head Brewery
