= Yak Ballz =

American rapper

- Born: Yashar Zadeh; 13 April 1982 (age 44)
- Origin: Flushing, Queens, New York, United States
- Genres: Hip hop
- Occupations: Rapper, Music Executive
- Years active: 1998–present
- Labels: Fondle'em Records; Eastern Conference Records; Definitive Jux Records; FloSpot Records
- Website: YakBallz.net Yak Ballz Myspace

Yak Ballz, born Yashar Zadeh, is an American independent hip hop artist who was brought up in Flushing, Queens, New York. He is one of the original members of The Weathermen. He is also a member of Cardboard City. Since 2019 he has worked for Warner Bros. Records as Vice President of their Media & Strategic Development team.

== Early life and education ==
Yak would go on to achieve first runner-up honors two more times after that, but more importantly, the aspiring MC grabbed the attention of several interested people in attendance, including Armando "Mondee" Torres and Brett Scott, who approached Vaz about getting Yak to appear on their new mixtape.

Yak is of Persian heritage. He is a graduate from State University of New York at New Paltz with a Bachelor of Science in business management.

== Career ==
Bobbito Garcia put Yak's demo, "Flossin'," on his CM Famalam show on 89.9 FM WKCR in New York. He later invited Yak to appear on the show in 1998. After a few impressive appearances on WKCR, and "Flossin'" gaining regular rotation, Bobbito approached Yak about some new original music. Yak's lyrics caught the attention of Cage, who was impressed enough to reach out to him; making him an original member of The Weathermen. Soon after, Yak released his first 12-inch, Homepiss in 2000, courtesy of Bobbito and his Fondle'em label. His 4-song EP was released featuring "Flossin'," "The Plague," "Nasty or Nice," and "Homepiss."

=== The Freakshow ===
In 2001, Yak followed up the EP with a three-song vinyl 12-inch, The Freakshow, which was one of the first ever 12-inch releases by the indie hip hop label Definitive Jux.

=== While You Were Sleeping ===
In 2003, he released While You Were Sleeping b/w The Drill 12-inch with Traffic Entertainment. Once Eastern Conference Records, then home to fellow Weathermen; Cage and Tame One, heard of this single they moved to sign Yak to an album deal. After working on The Weathermen's Conspiracy mixtape (2003) Yak Ballz released his first album, My Claim in 2004 with guest appearances from both Cage and Tame One.

=== Scifentology ===
In 2006 he released Scifentology, a mixtape put out by Yak himself and Scifen clothing company which features cover art by Ewok One 5MH.

=== Scifentology II ===
In January 2008, Yak released his sophomore effort, Scifentology II on FloSpot Records in conjunction with Scifen Clothing. Scifentology II featured production from Aesop Rock and Camu Tao, among others. It also has guest appearances from Cage and Tame One. "Dirt Empire", a song produced by Aesop Rock, won the MTV Best Freshman Video with over 40,000 views.

In 2011, Yak released an extended play called Gas Galaxy, which was self-released in the fall.

== Selected discography ==
=== Albums ===
- My Claim (Eastern Conference Records/Caroline – 2004)
- Scifentology (Scifen Records – 2006)
- Scifentology II (FloSpot Records – 2008)
- Gas Galaxy (self-released – 2012)
- The Rumors Are True [as RÖÖD] (self-released – 2017)

=== 12-inch releases ===
- "Homepiss" / "Nasty or Nice" b/w "The Plague" / "Flossin" (Fondle'em Records – 2000)
- "The Freakshow" b/w "For the Critics"/ "Reign" (Definitive Jux Records – 2001)
- "The Drill" b/w "While You Were Sleeping" (Jersey Roots Entertainment/Traffic – 2003)

=== Compilations ===
- "Flossin" – Farewell Fondle'em (Definitive Jux Records – 2001)
- "The Freakshow" Definitive Jux Presents II (Definitive Jux Records – 2002)
- "5 Left in the Clip" with The Weathermen – Eastern Conference Allstars III (Eastern Conference Records – 2003)
- "Let the Games Begin" feat. Vast Aire – Eastern Conference Allstars IV (Eastern Conference Records – 2004)

=== Mixtapes ===
- 2005: The Missing Cassettes
- 2006: Scifentology: The Mixtape
- 2017: The Missing Cassettes 2
