= Goodwill Records =

Goodwill Records is a record label that was founded in Rome in 1994, primarily to release records by This Side Up, a melodic hardcore punk band in which two of the label's founders played. The label eventually absorbed the Bored Teenagers mailorder business that had been run by one of the founders, Dario Adamic, since 1990.

The label has worked with bands such as Liars Academy, At Half-Mast, The Headlines, Signs Of Hope, Pointing Finger, To The Embers, No More Fear, and Values Intact. This Side Up's third release, a split 7-inch album with Brazilian band White Frogs, sold 3,600 units and is to date the label's best selling record.

== Artists ==
- Argetti
- At Half-Mast
- Bystander
- Day Of The Dead
- Gut Feeling
- Just Die!
- Liars Academy
- My Turn
- Out Of Reach
- Overflow
- Peace Of Mind
- PHP
- Pointing Finger
- Radio Days
- Signs Of Hope
- Spirits
- The Damage Done
- The Headlines
- The Spring Of Rage
- This Side Up
- To the Embers
- Values Intact
- White Frogs
