= The Headlines =

Swedish punk rock band

- Origin: Malmö, Sweden
- Genres: Punk rock
- Years active: 2005–present
- Labels: Metalville Records
- Members: Jake, Kerry Bomb, Pete, Pete#2, Sofie Ward
- Past members: CC Rad, Andréas, T-Bone, Cim Dahlle
- Website: www.theheadlines.de

The Headlines is a punk rock band from Malmö, Sweden. They were formed in 2005. Their music is heavily influenced by such bands as The Clash, Rancid and Ramones. Stry Terrarie (Ebba Grön) has produced their first two albums along with the Wake Up EP. Since 2007 they have released six full-length albums, one EP, and four singles.

The band has toured with bands such as Millencolin, Danko Jones, Levellers (Great Britain) and Broilers (Germany). Over the past years they have played over 800 shows all over Europe, Canada, China, Japan, and Russia. The band has a loyal fan base in Germany, and frequently leave their country to play for more welcoming crowds abroad. During an interview about the release of Plug n Play bass player Kerry Bomb was quoted saying "There are a lot of people that hates us here in Malmö, it's all about image and attitude. We don't have enough tattoos and too much pink. In Germany nobody complains about that and the album has received great reviews" (article in Swedish).

On May 22 2020 the band released their sixth album ”Warpaint” on Metalville Records. The album was recorded and produced by Chips Kiesby.

2023 they played the punkfestival Rebellion Festival in Blackpool

== Side projects ==
Singer and guitar player Jake Lundtofte is doing solo shows, and has played with acts such as Stry och Stripparna and nosnow/noalps. Jake is also stand in for Lars Fredriksen in The Last Resort, as well as guitarist in Ida S. Vollmer & Svarta Fåret, along with members from VA Rocks, The Dahmers, and Shuvit.

== Discography ==
=== Albums ===
- Plug n Play (Radio Rebel Records) (2007)
- Making love to the city (Bad Dog/Cargo) (2009)
- The Headlines (Bad Dog) (2012)
- Vendetta (MetalSpiesser Records) (2015)
- In the End (MetalSpiesser Records) (2017)
- Warpaint (Metalville Records) (2020)
- Homewrecker (Sunny Bastard) (2024)

=== 7"s and EPs ===
- "Wake Up EP (Goodwill Records)" (2011)

=== Singles ===
- "Alles Was War" (2014)
- "Herz Brennt" (2014)
- "Ohne Dich" (2016)
- "I Will Protest" (2018)
- "Xmas Day" (2020)
- "Love and Hate" (2023)

=== Unreleased songs ===
- "När mitt hjärta sprängs" - unreleased Swedish version of their song Waiting Room (2011)
