= The Routine (album) =

Studio album by Hotwire
- Released: June 3, 2003
- Recorded: 2003 at Sound City Studios, Van Nuys, CA
- Genre: Alternative metal, nu metal
- Length: 42:05
- Label: RCA
- Producer: Matt Hyde

Hotwire chronology
Hotwire (2002)	The Routine (2003)

Singles from The Routine
- 1. "Not Today" Released: 2003

The Routine is the debut studio album by the American alternative metal band Hotwire. Produced by Matt Hyde, it was released on June 3, 2003, through RCA Records. The single "Not Today", was a hit on American rock radio, peaking at No. 40 on the Billboard Mainstream Rock chart. It is the band's last release before Hotwire disbanded.

Professional ratings
Review scores
Source	Rating
Allmusic	2.5/5 stars

== Track listing ==
All lyrics are written by Rus Martin; all music is composed by Rus Martin, Gabe Garcia, Chris Strauser, and Brian Borg.

No.	Title	Length
1.	"Not Today"	3:20
2.	"Invisible"	2:51
3.	"Nice Profile"	2:37
4.	"Rugburn"	3:54
5.	"Say What You Want"	6:08
6.	"Hands on You"	3:55
7.	"Magazine"	1:44
8.	"Tweaked"	2:19
9.	"Neuro Girl"	3:56
10.	"Colorblind"	3:43
11.	"How It Goes"	3:38
12.	"In the Unknown"	4:18
Total length:		42:05

== Personnel ==
Hotwire

- Rus Martin – Lead vocals, rhythm guitar
- Gabe Garcia – Lead guitar, backing vocals
- Chris Strauser – Bass guitar
- Brian Borg – Drums, percussion

Management

- Stephen Hutton & Chris Allen – Management for Uppercut Management, Mosaic Media Group
- Doug LeDuc & Davud Weise – Business Management for Gleiberman, Weise, & Associates
- Brian Schall – Legal for Barnes, Morris, Klein, Mark, Yorn & Levine
- Brian Malouf – A&R
- Sandi Schaffer – US Booking Agent for Evolution Talent
- Steve Strange – International Booking Agent for Helter Skelter

Artwork

- Frank Harkins – Art Direction
- Singer Design Co. – Album Design
- Marina Chavez – Photography

Production

- Matt Hyde – Producer, mixing
- Critter – Engineer
- Dan Druff – Editing, guitar technician
- Paul Forgues – Editing, engineer
- Stephen Marcussen – Mastering
- Pete Martine & Victor McCoyz – Assistant engineers
- Edmond Monsef – Editing
- John Nicholsen – Drum Technician
- Mike Terry – Editing, engineer

== Trivia ==
- The song "Not Today" appeared in the Konami video game Evolution Skateboarding.
- The song "Invisible" appeared in the EA video game Need for Speed: Underground.
