= Hotwire (band) =

American alternative metal band

- Origin: Newbury Park, California
- Genres: Alternative metal; nu metal; hard rock
- Years active: 1999–2003
- Labels: RCA Records; Chromium Bitch
- Past members: Gabriel Garcia; Rus Martin; Dan Hartman; Chris Strauser; Brian Borg; Jon Peloso; Kyle Holligner

Hotwire was an American alternative metal band from Newbury Park, California.

== History ==
Hotwire's members met at Newbury Park High School. After recording demos, they began opening for Will Haven, Strife, Hoobastank, and Audiovent but also garnered large support at the Troubadour in Los Angeles with an extended residency spanning six months. After signing with RCA Records in December 2000, they continued to tour taking slots supporting diverse acts such as Mogwai, Ben Harper, Iggy Pop and The Stooges, Björk, Darkest Hour, Bloodlet, As Friends Rust, Wu-Tang Clan, Poison The Well, Killswitch Engage, The Dillinger Escape Plan, and Atreyu. They released a four-track EP in 2002 before issuing their full-length album, The Routine in the summer of 2003. They followed the release of the album with a slot on the Ozzfest tour that year as well as making time for the Fuji Rock Festival in Japan. A single from the album, "Not Today", became a minor success on American rock radio, peaking at No. 40 on the Billboard Mainstream Rock chart. The band broke up soon after the Ozzfest tour despite accumulating much new material, citing both mismanagement of funds by their management and personal reasons.

== Members ==
- Gabriel Garcia - guitar, vocals - Formerly in Countervail since has released albums under the monikers Transfatal Express, St. Malaclypse and as himself. He has also produced and engineered the Trim album for Deadbirds as well as several songs for The Soft Hills' Painted World EP. He later scored music for several experimental films as well as collaborated on soundscapes/sound design for the Los Angeles Natural History Museum's Collapse Exhibit and Daft Punk's Electroma.
- Rus Martin - lead vocals, guitar - Formerly with Eyelid, Chlora, Leisure, now in Skyscraper Frontier, Beware the Idols and Fake Figures (the last one, a band composed with members of Atreyu and Scars of Tomorrow)
- Dan Hartman - bass guitar - Formerly in The A.M. Project, The Foundation AD
- Chris Strauser - bass guitar - Formerly in Countervail
- Brian Borg - drums - Formerly in Stuart, Insurgence, Deadbirds, WarWidow
- Jon Peloso - guitar - Formerly in Blue Equals Expired, Go Empire!, Deadbirds, now in WarWidow
- Kyle Hollinger - drums - Formerly in Crazy Town

Gabriel, Rus, and Brian are now under Coming Home Records and all participate in their respective projects.

Gabriel also owns Everyday Heaven recording studio.

== Discography ==
- Monkeywrench EP (Chromium Bitch Records, 2001)
- Hotwire EP (RCA Records, 2002)
- The Routine (RCA Records, 2003)

There was also a never released version of The Routine album, which was recorded during sessions in 2001/2002 and was to be released in 2002. The release of this version of the album was canceled because of creative differences between the label (RCA), producer (Dave Jerden) and the Band. Only four songs from this record later appeared on the Band's releases:

- Re-recorded version of song Clone appeared on Hotwire EP.
- Re-recorded versions of songs Tweaked and Neuro Girl in various versions appeared both on Hotwire EP and The Routine album released in 2003.
- Song Prosthetics of Steel has appeared on Japan version of The Routine album released in 2003 as a bonus song.

All other songs were turned down and whole album was re-recorded in late 2002 with a different tracklist and then released in 2003.

== Media ==
- The song "Invisible" from the album The Routine appears on the game Need For Speed Underground.
- The altered version of song "Not Today" appears on the game Evolution Skateboarding.
- The unreleased song "Cyanide Baby" from 2001 appears on the game MTV Sports: T.J. Lavin's Ultimate BMX.
- The song "Prosthetics of Steel" that was released as a bonus track on the Japanese version of the album The Routine appears on the game MX Superfly.
