= Swamp Head Brewery =

Brewery in Gainesville, Florida, U.S.

Coordinates: 29.6147°N 82.3769°W

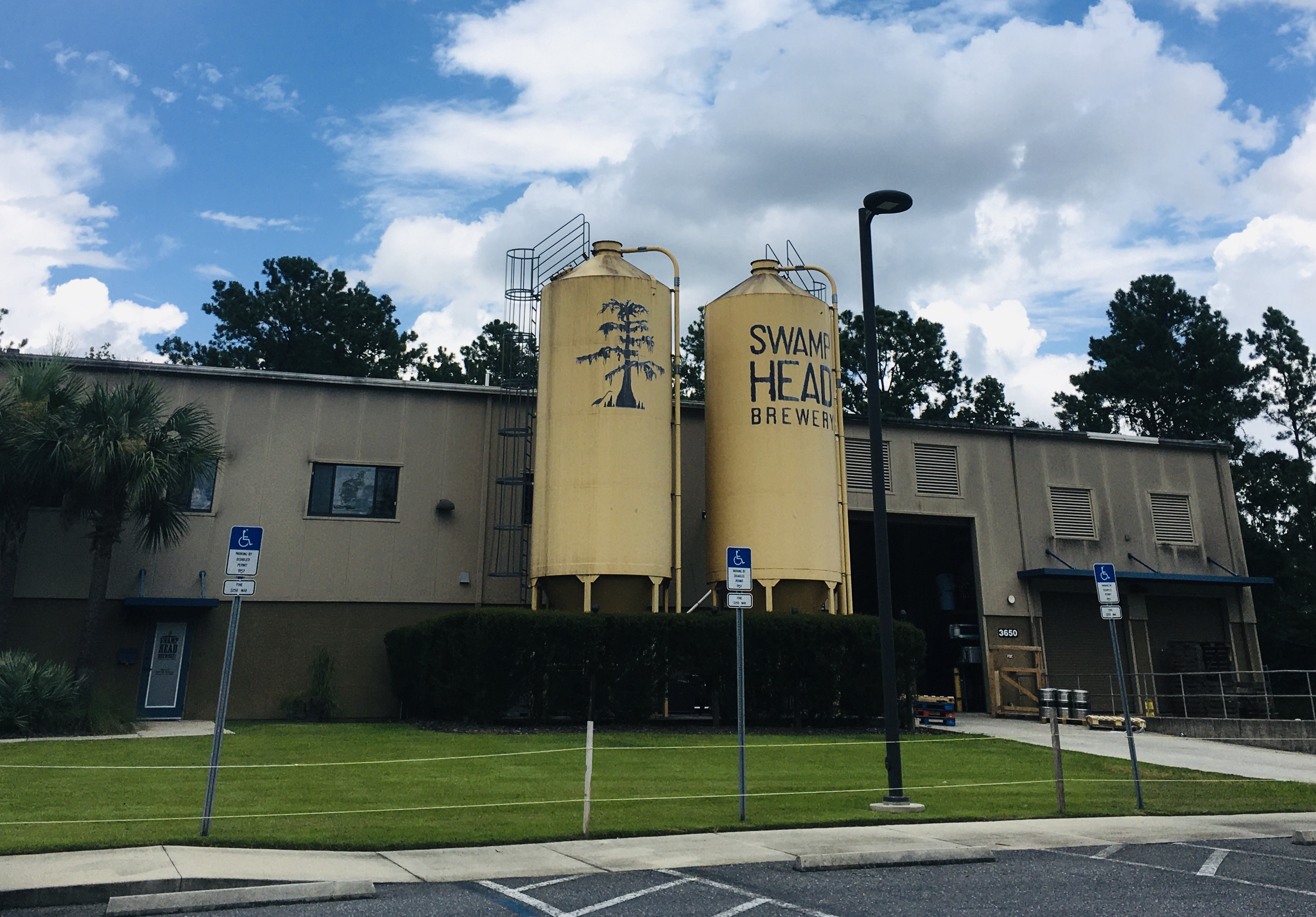
- Swamp Head Brewery in Gainesville.
- Industry: Alcoholic beverage
- Founded: 2008
- Headquarters: Gainesville, Florida
- Products: Beer
- Owner: Luke Kemper
- Website: swamphead.com

Swamp Head Brewery is a brewery in Gainesville, Florida.

== History ==
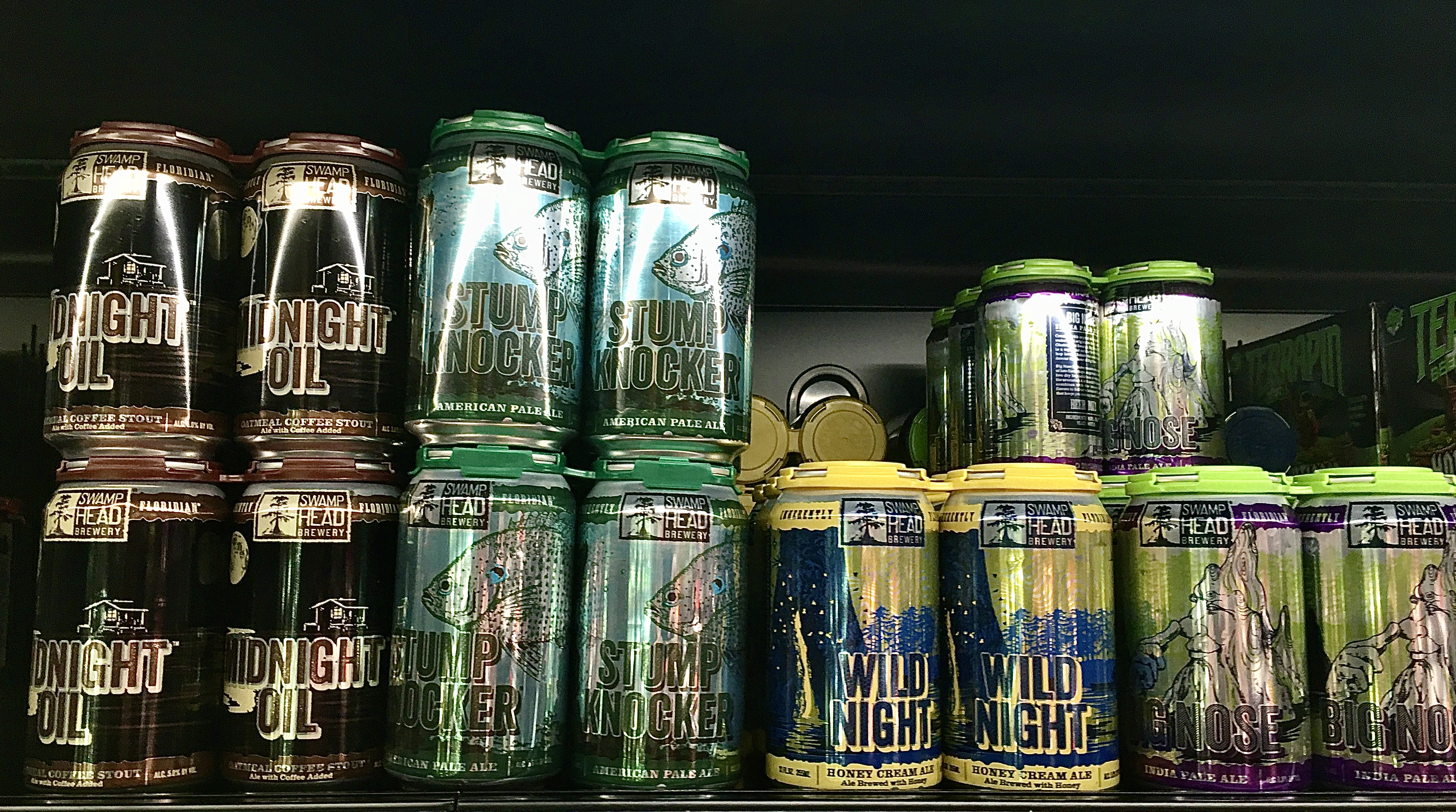
Swamp Head Brewery beer at a Target store.

Swamp Head Brewery was founded in 2008 by University of Florida alumnus Luke Kemper. Kemper got the idea of starting a brewery in Gainesville, Florida from the social beer culture of Colorado while living in Boulder, Colorado. Kemper got together with brewer Craig Birkmaier to start on making a brewery in Gainesville called Swamp Head Brewery. Kemper and Birkmaier got equipment from a former brewing company in Ocala called Spanish Springs Brewing Company and reassembled it in a warehouse in Gainesville. In November 2009 Swamp Head Brewery started distributing its products throughout Gainesville. In 2011, Swamp Head won 11 awards at the Best Florida Beer Championships. Two of the awards were best in show for Darkwater Floridian Dark Ale (Black IPA) and second best in show for Smoke Signal Smoked Porter. In 2012 a tasting room called The Wetlands was established for Swamp Head Brewery. In 2015 Swamp Head Brewery relocated to its present-day location on SW 42 Avenue. During the COVID-19 pandemic Swamp Head Brewery had to close The Wetlands tasting room and temporarily stop its draft beer orders but continued to make canned beer selling wholesale to distributors and retail through its on-site drive-thru.

== Products ==
Swamp Head Brewery products can be found at any retail store in Florida. Year-round offerings include Big Nose IPA, Forever Florida Lager, Understory Pale Ale, and Lemon Days Sour along with seasonal and limited release beers. Swamp Head brews their beer using a 30 Barrel brewhouse (930 Gallons). Swamp Head focuses on using Florida ingredients in their beers whenever possible. This has been showcased in beers like Wild Night, which uses locally sourced honey and Midnight Oil, which uses locally roasted organic coffee beans.
