= Bloodlet =

American metalcore band

- Origin: Orlando, Florida, U.S.
- Genres: Metalcore, sludge metal
- Years active: 1992–1998; 2001–2003; 2014; 2017–present
- Labels: Victory, A389, Stability, Structure, Smorgasbord, Translation Loss
- Members: Scott Angelacos; Thomas Crowther; Brett Walker; Charles King
- Past members: Matt Easley; Art Legere; John Stewart Jr; Keith Dalrymple; Jeremy Illges

Bloodlet are an American metalcore band from Orlando, Florida that formed in 1992. Their style of music (which has sometimes been dubbed as "evilcore" by critics) features elements of metalcore and sludge metal, which has been noted for influencing the 1990s underground hardcore scene.

== History ==
Bloodlet began by releasing a demo tape and a few 7-inches during the early portion of their career, including an EP on Canadian band Chokehold's record label Structure Records. They also collaborated with Damnation A.D. under the name Bloodnation to contribute to a compilation, the group were signed onto Victory Records, who issued the band's debut Entheogen in 1996. After extensive touring, the group's second album The Seraphim Fall was issued in 1998, and the group quietly entered a hiatus.

Bloodlet later reunited in 2001, and issue their third album Three Humid Nights in the Cypress Trees, which was released in 2002. The album was engineered by Steve Albini and was recorded at his Electrical Audio recording studio. A music video was produced for "Holy Rollin Homicide", and the group would disband once more a year later. In April 2002, the band toured with As Friends Rust and Hotwire.

In 2014, the group would reform for a special one-off performance at the A389 Recordings' 10th anniversary festival, performing with groups such as Integrity and Infest. That same year the label also issued a double-LP reissue of Entheogen, a limited edition live album, and a limited edition 5" of a rare outtake titled "Embrace". The song was recorded in 1994, and was forgotten until a hardcore blog made a post about it years later.

In 2017, the group made an appearance for This Is Hardcore 2017. Since then, the band has been active and have toured locally in Florida and around the country.

== Members ==
=== Current members ===
- Scott Angelacos – vocals (1992–1998, 2001–2003, 2014, 2017–present)
- Thomas Crowther – guitar (2014, 2017–present), bass (2002–2003)
- Brett Walker – guitar (2022–present)
- Charles King – drums (1993–1998, 2014, 2017–present)

=== Former members ===
- Aaron Sluss - bass (2022)
- Matt Easley – guitar (1992–1998, 2001–2003, 2014, 2017–2022)
- Art Legere – bass (1994–1998, 2001–2002, 2014, 2017–2022), guitar (1996)
- John Stewart Jr – drums (2001–2003)
- Keith Dalrymple – bass (1992–1994)
- Jeremy Illges – guitar (1994–1996)
- Tyler Gray – bass (1996)

== Discography ==
=== Studio albums ===
- Entheogen CD/CS/LP (March 5, 1996, Victory) (Double LP edition issued by A389 Recordings in 2014)
- The Seraphim Fall CD/CS/LP (March 10, 1998, Victory)
- Three Humid Nights in the Cypress Trees CD/CS (June 4, 2002, Victory)

=== Singles and EPs ===
- Bloodlet demo tape (1992, self-released)
- Bloodlet 7" (1993, Smorgasbord)
- Husk 7" (1993, Structure)
- Shell 7" (1994, Stability)
- Embrace 5" (2014, A389 Recordings/Stuck In the Past)
- Viper in Hand 10"/Digital (2019, Translation Loss Records)
- Stealing Fire Digital (2022, Translation Loss Records)

=== Compilation albums ===
- Eclectic (November 1, 1995, Victory)

=== Live albums ===
- Live On WFMU-FM (03.23.95) (April 19, 2014, A389 Recordings)
