= Liars Academy =

American rock band

- Origin: Baltimore, Maryland
- Genres: Emo, post-hardcore, alternative rock
- Years active: 2000–2007, 2023–present
- Labels: Equal Vision, Goodwill
- Past members: Ryan Shelkett; Matt Smith; Evan Tanner; Chris Camden; Fred Fritz; Eric Fauver

Liars Academy Is a rock band from Baltimore, Maryland, formed in 2000. They have released their material on Equal Vision Records and Goodwill Records. The band has included members/former members of Cross My Heart, Dead Red Sea, Daybreak, and Strike Anywhere.

== History ==
After the breakup of Baltimore's Cross My Heart, singer-guitarist Ryan Shelkett began playing with Strike Anywhere's guitarist Matt Smith on bass. The duo were eventually joined by Cross My Heart drummer Evan Tanner. Smith had contacts at Equal Vision Records, Strike Anywhere's former label, and so sent them the band, dubbed Liar's Academy, demo. After signing with Equal Vision, the band recorded their full-length debut No News Is Good News.

In late 2001, Liar's Academy set off on tour while Smith was in Europe with Strike Anywhere. At this point Chris Camden, another former Cross My Heart member, was recruited to play bass. When Smith returned, he became the band's guitarist, while Camden stayed on as bassist.

The band made two records as this line-up, 2002's Trading My Life EP and 2004's Demons LP, and toured with Elliott and Fairweather. The band members were dealt a blow when their equipment was stolen, forcing them to cancel the remainder of their tour. A donation from the Music Cares foundation allowed them to start touring again, but they had lost the momentum they had built since the album's release. Matt Smith wasn't able to juggle duties between Liars Academy and Strike Anywhere due to the rise in popularity of the latter band, and Fred Fritz replaced him. Tanner left in the fall of 2004, with Eric Fauver (also formerly of Daybreak) replacing him on drums. After a year of playing as this line-up, Liars Academy split up in May 2005.

A slightly modified version of Liars Academy continued to perform under the name Midnight Revival. The group consisted of Ryan Shelkett, Fred Fritz, Eric Fauver and Nick Barkley (ex-Fairweather, ex-Olympia) on bass. Chris Camden spent time playing bass in Firebird Band during this time. In late 2006 they decided to restart Liars Academy, and appeared as a five-piece with the addition of Bryan Elliott as an additional guitarist, but the reunion was brief. This line up, however, recorded two songs for a 7-inch on Goodwill which came out in 2007.

In December 2012, Liars Academy reunited for one show with Strike Anywhere at The Ottobar, Baltimore for former roadie Tony Pence's 40th Birthday Celebration.

Drummer Eric Fauver died on June 2, 2015.

== Post Liars Academy Projects ==
Evan Tanner played drums in War on Women from 2011 to 2016. Eric Fauver was the drummer of Beasts Of No Nation, and Final Conflict, as well as the bassist of Iron Cross before his death in 2015. Ryan Shelkett formed Desert Boys following the hiatus of Liars Academy. He is currently performing as a solo artist. Matt Smith is currently the guitarist of Senses Fail and Strike Anywhere.

== Former members ==
- Ryan Shelkett- Vocals, Guitar
- Chris Camden - Bass, Vocals
- Fred Fritz - Guitar, Vocals
- Matt Smith - Guitar, Vocals
- Evan Tanner - Drums (deceased)
- Bryan Elliott - Guitar, Vocals (deceased)
- Eric Fauver - Drums (deceased)

== Discography ==
=== EPs ===
- Trading My Life CD EP (2002), Equal Vision
- Run For Cover 7-inch EP (2007), Goodwill

=== Albums ===
- No News is Good News (2001), Equal Vision
- Demons (2004), Equal Vision
- Ghosts (2023), Steadfast Records
