= The Stryder =

US musical group

- Origin: Roslyn, New York, United States
- Genres: Pop, Alternative Rock
- Occupations: Band, Musician
- Years active: 1999-2003
- Label: Equal Vision Records
- Past members: Peter Toh, Scottie Redix, Nick Wendel, Durijah Lang, John Johansen
- Website: The Stryder's Official Website

The Stryder was an American band hailing from Long Island, New York, United States. The band was formed by Peter Toh and Scottie Redix in 1999 after their previous project, Yearly, disbanded following the departure of bassist Eben D'amico, who left to join Saves the Day. They added a vocalist and bassist, John Johansen and Nick Wendel respectively.

== History ==
The Stryder released a 7" on Elkion Records titled The Hits Just Keep on Comin' and shortly after signed a deal to Equal Vision Records and released their debut album Masquerade in the Key of Crime in the mid-2000. The band toured extensively and began writing new material in 2001. They added former Glassjaw drummer Durijah Lang, and moved Scottie Redix to guitar and backing vocals. In mid-2001 the band parted ways with vocalist John Johansen. Scottie stated in a 2019 interview that the split from Johansen was amicable and due to the change in creative direction the band was going in.

2002 saw the release of "Jungle City Twitch". Debuting a new sound, The Stryder continued to tour the country in support of the new release. In 2003/2004, Elkion Records released Savor The Danger! which contained a collection of old demos and the two songs from the 7" previously released on the label.

Toh released his first solo EP Cleopatra in 2004 on Elkion Records. In 2006, Toh went on to start an internet TV/new media company, Hidden Track TV with Adam Schleichkorn, and released a solo EP titled Shoes of a Beast. Durijah moved on to become the drummer of Classic Case and in 2007, became Pete Parada's replacement in Saves The Day.

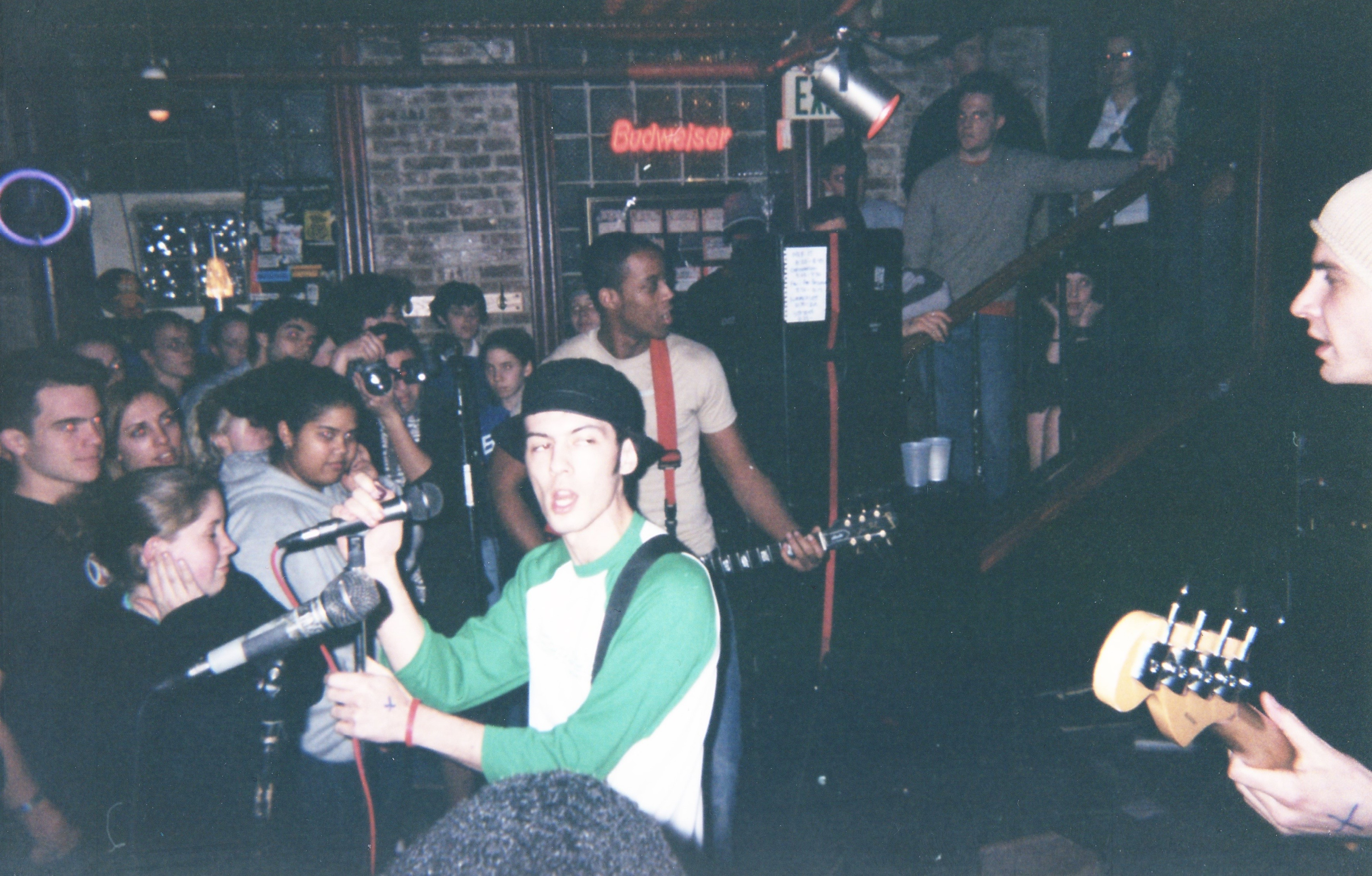
The Stryder performing at the Sidebar in Baltimore on January 28, 2002. (from left to right) Peter Toh, Scottie Redix, Nick Wendel

== Discography ==
=== Albums ===
- Masquerade in the Key of Crime (Equal Vision Records - 2000)
- Jungle City Twitch (Equal Vision Records - 2002)

=== EPs ===
- The Hits Just Keep on Comin'... (Elkion Records - 2000)
- Savor the Danger! (Elkion Records - 2002)
