= Black Market Activities discography =

This is a comprehensive discography of all releases put out by American hardcore and metal record label Black Market Activities. Since October 2004, the label has had a distribution deal with Metal Blade Records.

| Cat. No. | Artist | Title | Format | Release date | Notes |
|---|---|---|---|---|---|
| BMA001 | Backstabbers Incorporated | Bare as Bones | CD | July 15, 2003 | |
| BMA002 | Deadwater Drowning | Deadwater Drowning | EP | July 15, 2003 | |
| BMA003 | Found Dead Hanging | Dulling Occams Razor | EP | July 15, 2003 | |
| BMA004 | From a Second Story Window | Not One Word Has Been Omitted | EP | October 19, 2004 | |
| BMA005 | Psyopus | Ideas of Reference | CD | Mar 17, 2004 | |
| BMA006 | Lamb of God | As the Palaces Burn | LP | May 18, 2004 | Picture disc |
| BMA007 | Paria | Misanthropos | CD | Nov 2, 2004 | |
| BMA008 | Born from Pain | Sands of Time | CD | Nov 2, 2004 | |
| BMA009 | Animosity | Empires | CD | August 23, 2005 | |
| BMA010 | Premonitions of War | Glorified Dirt + The True Face of Panic | CD | November 1, 2005 | |
| BMA011 | Ed Gein | Judas Goats & Dieseleaters | CD | November 1, 2005 | |
| BMA012 | From a Second Story Window | Delenda | CD | July 11, 2006 | |
| BMA013 | Destroy Destroy Destroy | Devour the Power | CD | Sep 5, 2006 | |
| BMA014 | Behold... The Arctopus | Nano-Nucleonic Cyborg Summoning | CD | August 22, 2006 | |
| BMA015 | Gaza | I Don't Care Where I Go When I Die | CD | October 3, 2006 | |
| BMA016 | the_Network | This is Your Pig's Portrait | CD | January 23, 2007 | |
| BMA017 | Architect | All Is Not Lost | CD | January 23, 2007 | |
| BMA018 | Dance Club Massacre | Feast of the Blood Monsters | CD | July 10, 2007 | |
| BMA019 | Engineer | The Dregs | CD, LP | July 10, 2007 | Orange–splattered 180 gram LP |
| BMA020 | Animosity | Animal | CD | October 2, 2007 | |
| BMA021 | Behold... The Arctopus | Skullgrid | CD, LP | October 16, 2007 | |
| BMA022 | The Tony Danza Tap Dance Extravaganza | Danza II: Electric Boogaloo | CD | October 16, 2007 | |
| BMA023 | Khann | Tofutopia | CD | November 13, 2007 | |
| BMA024 | From a Second Story Window | Conversations | CD | May 27, 2008 | |
| BMA025 | Romans | All Those Wrists | CD | June 10, 2008 | |
| BMA026 | Cancer Bats | Hail Destroyer | CD | June 24, 2008 | |
| BMA027 | Lords | Fuck All Y'All Motherfuckers | CD | October 14, 2008 | |
| BMA028 | Sweet Cobra | Forever | | June 10, 2008 | |
| BMA029 | Dance Club Massacre | Circle of Death | CD | November 11, 2008 | |
| BMA030 | Architect | Ghost of the Salt Water Machines | CD | November 25, 2008 | |
| BMA031 | Destroy Destroy Destroy | Battle Sluts | | January 6, 2009 | |
| BMA032 | the_Network / Throat | Notes from the Turncoat Campaign | CD | November 18, 2008 | |
| BMA033 | Paria | The Barnacle Cordious | | March 17, 2009 | |
| BMA034 | Lye by Mistake | Fea Jur | CD | October 13, 2009 | |
| BMA035 | Gaza | He Is Never Coming Back | CD | November 10, 2009 | |
| BMA036 | the_Network | Bishop Kent Manning | CD | September 15, 2009 | |
| BMA037 | The Abominable Iron Sloth | The Id Will Overcome | CD | April 27, 2010 | |
| BMA038 | The Tony Danza Tap Dance Extravaganza | Danza III: The Series of Unfortunate Events | CD | July 6, 2010 | |
| BMA039 | Sweet Cobra | Mercy | CD | September 28, 2010 | |
| BMA040 | Khan | Erode | CD | June 21, 2011 | |
| BMA041 | Today Is the Day | Pain Is a Warning | CD | August 16, 2011 | |
| BMA042 | Engineer | Crooked Voices | CD | June 7, 2011 | |
| BMA044 | Fit for an Autopsy | The Process of Human Extermination | CD | June 21, 2011 | |
| BMA046 | Hivesmasher | Gutter Choir | LP | October 28, 2012 | |

== Canceled releases ==
| Artist | Title | Format | Notes |
|---|---|---|---|
| Beyond the Sixth Seal | Earth and Sphere | LP | This was to be BMA010 in early 2004. |
| The Red Chord | Fused Together in Revolving Doors | LP | This was to be BMA007 in early 2004. |
| Sleep Terror | Unknown | | Sleep Terror project became inactive. |
