= List of new wave of American heavy metal bands =

A list of notable bands and artists who emerged during the new wave of American heavy metal era of music in the early to mid-1990s:

== List of key artists ==
=== 0–9 ===
- 10 Years
- 100 Demons
- 108
- 21 Guns
- 25 ta Life
- 36 Crazyfists
- 7 Angels 7 Plagues

=== A ===
- Abigail Williams
- The Absence
- The Acacia Strain
- Acid Bath
- The Accüsed
- A Day to Remember
- Adema
- A Dozen Furies
- AFI
- Age of Ruin
- Agnostic Front
- The Agony Scene
- Aiden
- A Life Once Lost
- All Out War
- All Shall Perish
- All That Remains
- The Alter Boys
- Amen
- American Head Charge
- American Me
- Andrew W.K.
- Animosity
- Armor for Sleep
- As Cities Burn
- Asesino
- As I Lay Dying
- At All Cost
- A Static Lullaby
- At the Drive-In
- Atreyu
- August Burns Red
- The Autumn Offering
- Avenged Sevenfold

=== B ===
- Bad Acid Trip
- Bane
- The Banner
- Bayside
- Becoming the Archetype
- Behold... The Arctopus
- Benümb
- Between the Buried and Me
- Biohazard
- The Black Dahlia Murder
- Black Label Society
- Blacklisted
- Black Veil Brides
- The Blamed
- Bleed the Sky
- Bleeding Through
- The Bled
- The Blood Brothers
- Bloodlined Calligraphy
- Blood Has Been Shed
- BlöödHag
- Bloodsimple
- Botch
- Boysetsfire
- Breakdown
- Bullet For My Valentine
- Buried Inside
- Burn Season
- Burnt by the Sun
- Bury Your Dead
- Buzzoven
- Byzantine

=== C ===
- Calico System
- Candiria
- Cannae
- Casey Chaos
- Carnifex
- Cave In
- Cavity
- Champion
- The Chariot
- Chimaira
- Coal Chamber
- Coalesce
- Cold
- Comeback Kid
- Common Dead
- Converge
- Corrosion of Conformity
- Cro-Mags
- Crowbar
- Crumbsuckers
- Cursed
- Cursive

=== D ===
- Damageplan
- Darkest Hour
- Deftones
- Demon Hunter
- DevilDriver
- The Devil Wears Prada
- The Dillinger Escape Plan
- Disturbed
- Down
- D.R.I.
- The Dream Is Dead
- Drowning Pool
- Dry Kill Logic

=== E ===
- Eighteen Visions
- The End
- The Esoteric
- Every Time I Die

=== F ===
- Fear Factory
- Five Finger Death Punch

=== G ===
- Give Up the Ghost
- Goatwhore
- God Forbid
- Godsmack

=== H ===
- Haste the Day
- Hatebreed
- High on Fire
- The Hope Conspiracy
- The Human Abstract

=== I ===
- Ill Niño

=== J ===
- The Juliana Theory
- The Junior Varsity

=== K ===
- Korn
- Killswitch Engage

=== L ===
- Lamb of God

=== M ===
- Machine Head
- Mahavatar
- Marilyn Manson
- Martyr A.D.
- Mastodon
- Misery Index
- Misery Signals
- Most Precious Blood
- Mudvayne
- Mushroomhead

=== N ===
- Nine Inch Nails
- Norma Jean

=== O ===
- Overcast

=== P ===
- Pantera
- Poison the Well

=== R ===
- The Red Chord
- The Red Death

=== S ===
- Sevendust
- Shadows Fall
- Skinlab
- Soulfly
- Slipknot
- Spineshank
- Static-X
- Still Remains
- Stone Sour
- Suicide Silence
- Superjoint
- System of a Down

=== T ===
- T.S.O.L.
- Terror
- These Arms Are Snakes
- Thine Eyes Bleed
- This Is Hell
- Thrice
- Through the Eyes of the Dead
- Throwdown
- Thursday
- Training for Utopia
- Trivium
- Twelve Tribes
- Twisted Method

=== U ===
- Underoath
- Unearth

=== V ===
- Vision of Disorder

=== W ===
- Walls of Jericho
- Will Haven
- With Passion

=== Y ===
- Yakuza
- Year of Desolation
- Youth of Today

=== Z ===
- Zao
- Zeke
- Zero Down
- Zimmers Hole

== See also ==
- New wave of British heavy metal
