= Danza IIII: The Alpha – The Omega =

Studio album by The Tony Danza Tapdance Extravaganza
- Released: October 16, 2012
- Genres: Mathcore, djent, deathcore
- Length: 55:20
- Label: Black Market Activities
- Producer: Josh Travis

The Tony Danza Tapdance Extravaganza chronology
| Danza III: The Series of Unfortunate Events (2010) | Danza IIII: The Alpha – The Omega (2012) |

Danza IIII: The Alpha – The Omega (also simply known as Danza IIII) is the fourth studio album by American mathcore band The Tony Danza Tapdance Extravaganza. The album was released on October 16, 2012 through Black Market Activities. The record was heavily praised and was seen as a fitting finale for the band's existence. Following Danza IIII and the dissolution of the band, vocalist Jessie Freeland became a police officer in 2014 while guitarist Josh Travis would later go on to join metalcore band Emmure in 2016.

== Background ==
The album was recorded as two-piece with Jessie Freeland on vocals and Josh Travis handling all instruments. Track 12, "The Alpha the Omega," features guest vocals by Phil Bozeman of Whitechapel and Alex Erian from Despised Icon. Bozeman's part was recorded by Brandon Cagle at Atomic Audio in Tampa, Florida, while Erian's part was recorded by Antoine Lussier at 357 Productions in Montreal, Quebec. The album's artwork was done by Michael J. Windsor, who has done artwork for bands such as The Red Chord and Pig Destroyer, as well as the novels The Da Vinci Code and Darkly Dreaming Dexter.

On August 23, 2012, Joshua Travis made this statement, regarding the band's future:

"For this album, Jessie and I were looking to create more of a visceral vibe than a completely technical vibe. There's parts that do still get a bit chaotic of course, but not nearly as much as the avid listener is used to. Everything about this record is way more to the point, with much more heart put into it rather than just seeing how many notes could be thrown into a part or seeking to create 'the heaviest shit ever' or any of that nonsense. The record being titled The Alpha – The Omega, to us symbolized the beginning and the end of Danza. Jessie and I hope you enjoy it as much as we enjoyed creating it for you all."

While Danza IIII doesn't sway too far from the group's previous mathcore style the band is renowned for, it has also been heavily credited to be influenced by djent.

== Reception ==
Professional ratings
Review scores
| Source | Rating |
|---|---|
| Alternative Press | 4/5 stars |
| MetalSucks | 4.5/5 stars |
| New Transcendence | 9.8/10 |

Danza IIII received critical acclaim upon release.

Reviewing the album for Alternative Press, Matthew Colwell praised the album's melodic moments and favorably compared the song "Paul Bunyan and the Blue Ox" to the bands Periphery, The Dillinger Escape Plan, and Car Bomb. Colwell concluded his review by saying "For a final blow, Danza deliver the goods in every way with an uncompromising pile of riffs while continuing to show they're not a one-trick pony. Tech-metal is losing one of its best bands with IIII, but they couldn't have sent themselves off on a better note."

MetalSucks reviewer Dave Mustein noted the band's maturity and how far they have progressed since their first album. Mustein praised the band's songwriting ability and referred to the melodic moments as "melancholic beauty" as well as the album's production for "sounding gritty but professional, digital but uncompressed." Mustein criticized the album's numerous samples, which decreased the impact of "Hold the Line" and stated "it's almost impossible to sit through the entirety of the glitchy, gimmicky 'Some Things Are Better Left Unsaid.'" Mustein concluded his review by calling the album "the most aggressive, the most dominant, the most confident, and the heaviest album of the year."

Connor Welsh of New Transcendence referred to "You Won't" and "Rudy x 3" as sounding like B-sides from Danza III with some flair from Danza II. Welsh praised the album's dynamics as well as the "groovier and co-operative tone" of the guitar and bass. Jessie Freeland's vocal performance was also praised, especially on the title track. Welsh referred to the album as "a dense, chaotic, yet marvelously ethereal blending of mathy hardcore and groovy deathcore" and called the album a "mathcore masterpiece."

== Track listing ==
All lyrics are written by Jessie Freeland; all music is composed by Josh Travis.

| No. | Title | Length |
|---|---|---|
| 1. | "Behind Those Eyes" | 4:40 |
| 2. | "You Won't" | 3:54 |
| 3. | "Rudy X 3" | 3:21 |
| 4. | "The Crossfire" (instrumental) | 1:28 |
| 5. | "Hold the Line" | 4:51 |
| 6. | "Death Eater" | 2:35 |
| 7. | "Canadian Bacon" | 4:07 |
| 8. | "Paul Bunyan and the Blue Ox" (instrumental) | 7:26 |
| 9. | "Disconnecting, Pt. 1" (instrumental) | 1:02 |
| 10. | "This Cut Was the Deepest" | 2:51 |
| 11. | "Disconnecting, Pt. 2" (instrumental) | 0:24 |
| 12. | "The Alpha the Omega" (feat. Phil Bozeman and Alex Erian) | 3:16 |
| 13. | "Some Things Are Better Left Unsaid" (instrumental) | 5:35 |
| 14. | "Don't Try This at Home" | 2:52 |
| 15. | "This Is Forever" | 6:18 |

- Some versions of the album merge "This Cut Was the Deepest" together with "Disconnecting, Pt. 2" and split "Some Things Are Better Left Unsaid" into two separate tracks.

== Personnel ==
The Tony Danza Tapdance Extravaganza

- Jessie Freeland – lead vocals
- Josh Travis – guitar, bass, drum programming, producer, engineer, backing vocals on "Don't Try This at Home"

Additional

- Phil Bozeman (Whitechapel) – additional vocals on "The Alpha the Omega"
- Alex Erian (Despised Icon) – additional vocals on "The Alpha the Omega"
- Nicholas Scott – engineer, mixing, mastering
- Michael J. Windsor – art direction, illustration, design
