= Danza III: The Series of Unfortunate Events =

Studio album by The Tony Danza Tapdance Extravaganza
- Released: July 6, 2010
- Genres: Mathcore; djent
- Length: 58:50
- Label: Black Market Activities
- Producer: Josh Travis

The Tony Danza Tapdance Extravaganza chronology
Danza II: The Electric Boogaloo (2007)	Danza III: The Series of Unfortunate Events (2010)	Danza IIII: The Alpha – The Omega (2012)

Danza III: The Series of Unfortunate Events is the third studio album by American mathcore band The Tony Danza Tapdance Extravaganza. The album was released July 6, 2010, via Guy Kozowyk's Black Market Activities. Danza III is noted for being the first TTDTE album to feature its new lineup, most notably guitarist and primary songwriter Joshua Travis from Calico System, a band where he previously played guitar.

== Critical reception ==
Professional ratings
Review scores
Source	Rating
AllMusic	2.5/5 stars
The NewReview	4.5/5 stars
Skulls N Bones	(positive)
Under the Gun Review	9/10

Danza III has received generally positive reception. The NewReview gave the album 4.5 out of 5 stating, "simply put, The Tony Danza Tapdance Extravaganza has summoned one of the most vile sounding and entertaining extreme music releases of the year." Skulls N Bones writer Carlos Moreno gave the album an extremely positive review, even going so far as to call it "the best CD of 2010 in [his] professional opinion."

AllMusic's Greg Prato scored the album 2.5 out of 5, commenting that the album was surely one of the most ferocious works to come from a fairly young band. However, he was more critical of the repetitive quality of the nonstop sonic onslaught, which he suggests begins to work against the band as many of the songs become increasingly predictable.

== Track listing ==
All tracks are written by The Tony Danza Tapdance Extravaganza.

No.	Title	Length
1.	"Vicki Mayhem"	4:17
2.	"Yippie-Kay-Yay Motherf@#$%^"	3:23
3.	"I Am Sammy Jankis"	3:31
4.	"The Lost & Damned"	2:20
5.	"Passenger 57"	2:41
6.	"There's a Time and a Place for Everything"	4:18
7.	"W.A.L.L.S."	2:28
8.	"Suicide's Best Friend"	3:11
9.	"Hour of the Time"	3:38
10.	"The Union"	2:19
11.	"A Trail of Tears"	3:03
12.	"12-21-12" (song ends at 4:40; a hidden track begins at 14:40 feat. Nick Arthur of Molotov Solution)	23:41
Total length:		58:50

== Personnel ==
The Tony Danza Tapdance Extravaganza

- Jessie Freeland – vocals
- Josh Travis – guitar, bass guitar
- Mike Bradley – drums

Production

- Josh Travis – producer
- Jeremiah Scott – engineer
- Nick Zampiello – mastering
- Rob Gonnella – mastering
- Steve Blackmon – mixing
- Michael J. Windsor – art direction and design

== Popular culture ==
- The song titled "Yippie-Kay-Yay Motherf@#$%^" comes from a phrase made by the actor Bruce Willis in the 1988 movie Die Hard.
- The song titled "I Am Sammy Jankis" is based on the character Sammy Jankis from the 2000 film Memento.
- The song titled "Passenger 57" cites the 1992 action thriller film Passenger 57, starting Wesley Snipes.
