= Pish posh =

Pish posh may refer to:

- Pish Posh, a 2006 children's novel by American author Ellen Potter
- A catchphrase in Noddy (TV series)
- A song by the American band Paria from the 2009 album The Barnacle Cordious
- A book in the Serendipity book series
