= Malice (Through the Eyes of the Dead album) =

Studio album by Through the Eyes of the Dead
- Released: August 21, 2007
- Recorded: February 16–March 15, 2007
- Genres: Deathcore, melodic death metal
- Length: 38:35
- Label: Prosthetic
- Producer: Erik Rutan

Through the Eyes of the Dead chronology
Bloodlust (2005)	Malice (2007)	Skepsis (2010)

Professional ratings
Review scores
Source	Rating
Blabbermouth.net	8/10
MetalSucks	4.5/5 stars

Malice is the second studio album by Through the Eyes of the Dead, released in 2007. The album features artwork from Paul Romano (Mastodon, The Red Chord). The band enlisted Erik Rutan (Hate Eternal, ex-Morbid Angel) for production, engineering and mixing, with Alan Douches (Unearth, Shadows Fall) of West Side Music mastering the effort. The band travelled to Mana Studios in St. Petersburg, Florida, on February 16, and finished recording on March 15.

Malice is the band's only album to feature Nate Johnson (formerly of Premonitions of War and Deadwater Drowning) on vocals, as he left the band alongside drummer Josh Kulick in late 2007.

The album landed at number nine on Billboard's Heatseeker Chart, with first week sales of 3,400.

== Critical reception ==
Exclaim! wrote that Malice "is as outrageously chaotic as it is heavy, and has the ability to fully satiate any death metal lover's appetite for something raw."

== Track listing ==
No.	Title	Length
1.	"Failure in the Flesh"	4:08
2.	"The Undead Parade"	3:22
3.	"To Wage a War"	4:08
4.	"A Catastrophe of Epic Proportions"	3:32
5.	"As Good as Dead"	4:34
6.	"Welcome to the Wasteland"	3:00
7.	"Malice"	3:41
8.	"To the Ruins"	3:10
9.	"Dead End Roads"	3:51
10.	"Interlude"	0:39
11.	"Pull the Trigger"	4:30
Total length:		38:35

== Personnel ==
Through the Eyes of the Dead

- Nate Johnson – vocals
- Justin Longshore – guitar
- Chris Anderson - guitar
- Jake Osokie – bass
- Josh Kulick – drums

Additional

- Ryan Knight – lead guitar (track 5)
- Erik Rutan – producer, engineer, mixing
- Shawn Ohtani – additional engineering
- Alan Douches – mastering
- Paul Romano – art direction, artwork, design
