= Cassandra Complex (disambiguation) =

The Cassandra complex is a psychological phenomenon in which an individual's accurate prediction of a crisis is ignored or dismissed.

Cassandra Complex may also refer to:

- The Cassandra Complex (band), an electronic music band
- The Cassandra Complex (EP), a 2003 demo EP by the band From a Second Story Window
- The Cassandra Complex (UK) / Cassandra in Reverse (US), a novel by Holly Smale
- "Cassandra Complex" (12 Monkeys), a 2015 television episode
