= The Torn Instances =

EP by Paria
- Released: 2003
- Genre: Experimental metal, grindcore
- Length: 21:37
- Label: Imagine It Records (II002)

Paria chronology
The Torn Instances (2003)	Misanthropos (2004)

The Torn Instances is the debut EP by American experimental metal band Paria. It was released in 2003 by Imagine It Records. Based on the strength of the EP, the band was signed to Black Market Activities (with distribution through Metal Blade Records) and co-released their debut full-length with Imagine It.

This early release from the band featured less of the experimental sounds on their two full-length albums with more of a focus on melodic metalcore, however, progressive elements are not completely disregarded..

== Track listing ==
All tracks are written by Paria, except where noted.

No.	Title	Length
1.	"Dancing to the Sounds of Screams"	4:44
2.	"A Torn Instance"	5:02
Total length:		8:39
