= Battle Sluts =

2009 album by Destroy Destroy Destroy

Studio album by Destroy Destroy Destroy
- Released: January 6, 2009
- Recorded: Anthem Productions, Nashville, Tennessee
- Genre: Melodic death metal, power metal, thrash metal
- Length: 41:48
- Label: Black Market Activities
- Producer: Jeremiah Scott

Destroy Destroy Destroy chronology
Devour the Power (2006)	Battle Sluts (2009)

Professional ratings
Review scores
Source	Rating
AllMusic	3.5/5 stars

Battle Sluts is the second album by American heavy metal band Destroy Destroy Destroy.

== Track listing ==
No.	Title	Length
1.	"The Second Coming"	1:42
2.	"Battle Upon the Arctic Plains"	4:12
3.	"Beyond the Scorpion Gate"	4:05
4.	"Realm of Ancient Shadows"	3:44
5.	"Born of Thunder"	3:51
6.	"To Die Without Honour"	1:13
7.	"The Winged Panther"	4:18
8.	"The Wretched Forrest"	3:02
9.	"The Berserker’s Field of Whores"	2:45
10.	"Agents of Hypocrisy (feat. Jessie "Danza" Freeland of The Tony Danza Tapdance Extravaganza)"	3:56
11.	"The Return of the Geishmal Undead"	5:45
12.	"Battle Slut Drinking Song"	3:15

== Personnel ==
Destroy Destroy Destroy

- Bryan Kemp — lead vocals
- Jeremiah Scott — guitar, backing vocals
- Way Barrier — guitar, backing vocals
- Adam Phillips — bass, backing vocals
- Brian Shorter — keyboards, backing vocals
- Andrew Core — drums

Production

- Chris Dauphin — orchestration
- Hunter Camp — backing vocals
- Mike Mosier — backing vocals
- Brad Hartley — backing vocals
- Jessie "Danza" Freeland (The Tony Danza Tapdance Extravaganza) — guest vocals on "Agents of Hypocrisy"
