= No Absolutes in Human Suffering =

Studio album by Gaza
- Released: July 31, 2012
- Recorded: Godcity Studios, Salem, Massachusetts
- Genres: Grindcore; mathcore; hardcore punk; sludge metal
- Length: 43:14
- Label: Black Market Activities
- Producer: Kurt Ballou

Gaza chronology
He Is Never Coming Back (2009)	No Absolutes in Human Suffering (2012)

Professional ratings
Review scores
Source	Rating
Pitchfork Media	7.4/10
Spin	8/10

No Absolutes in Human Suffering is the third and final studio album by American hardcore band Gaza. The album's name is inspired by novelist Cormac McCarthy.

== Track listing ==
No.	Title	Length
1.	"Mostly Hair and Bones Now"	2:35
2.	"This We Celebrate"	4:42
3.	"The Truth Weighs Nothing"	1:43
4.	"Not With All the Hopes in the World"	6:22
5.	"The Vipers"	3:51
6.	"No Absolutes in Human Suffering"	3:39
7.	"The Crown"	3:03
8.	"When They Beg"	3:48
9.	"Winter in Her Blood"	3:57
10.	"Skull Trophy"	3:34
11.	"Routine and Then Death"	6:01
Total length:		43:14

== Personnel ==
- Jon Parkin – vocals
- Michael Mason – guitar
- Anthony Lucero – bass
- Casey Hansen – drums
