= Danza II: The Electric Boogaloo =

Studio album by The Tony Danza Tapdance Extravaganza
- Released: October 16, 2007
- Studios: Anthem Studios, Nashville, Tennessee
- Genres: Mathcore, grindcore
- Length: 31:34
- Label: Black Market Activities
- Producer: Jeremiah Scott

The Tony Danza Tapdance Extravaganza chronology
The Tony Danza Tapdance Extravaganza (2005)	Danza II: The Electric Boogaloo (2007)	Danza III: The Series of Unfortunate Events (2010)

Professional ratings
Review scores
Source	Rating
Allmusic	3.5/5 stars
Lambgoat	7/10
Sea of Tranquility	4.5/5 stars

Danza II: The Electric Boogaloo is the second studio album by the mathcore band The Tony Danza Tapdance Extravaganza. The album was released on October 16, 2007, via Guy Kozowyk's Black Market Activities and distributed by Metal Blade Records.

== Background ==
Danza II is a concept album focusing on a protagonist named Cecil Bennett, a man with dwarfism and a short temper that visits a bar one night and eventually murders everyone in the establishment when he grows tired of everyone's taunting comments.

The album was produced by Jeremiah Scott of Demon Hunter and Destroy Destroy Destroy. Following the album's release, every member but vocalist Jessie Freeland left the band. Freeland would later resume TTDTE by recruiting guitarist Josh Travis and drummer Mike Bradley. The trio would then go on to create Danza III: The Series of Unfortunate Events (2010).

== Track listing ==
All lyrics are written by Jessie Freeland; all music is composed by The Tony Danza Tapdance Extravaganza.

No.	Title	Length
1.	"T.R.O.U.B.L.E."	1:00
2.	"You Gonna Buy the Beers or the Whole Damn Bar"	3:12
3.	"I Don't Mean to Impose, But I Am the Ocean"	2:18
4.	"Go Greyhound"	3:28
5.	"Top English"	0:49
6.	"The Electric Boogaloo" (feat. Bruce Fitzhugh of Living Sacrifice)	3:03
7.	"Crunchy Black Did Me in at Midnight Madness"	2:06
8.	"Mad Max Beyond Superdome"	2:09
9.	"Carroll 14 Wossman 7"	2:25
10.	"Nobody Eats BBQ Two Days in a Row"	3:07
11.	"Shot of Whiskey"	0:49
12.	"Rollin' and Tumblin' on Satan's Rotisserie"	2:11
13.	"The Louisiana Dive Bar Massacre" (hidden track "Yankees Don't Make Sweet Tea" begins at 2:51)	4:57
Total length:		31:34

== Personnel ==
The Tony Danza Tapdance Extravaganza

- Jessie Freeland – vocals
- Brad Thomson – guitar
- Layne Meylain – guitar, art direction
- Mike Butler – bass
- Mason Crooks – drums

Additional

- Jeremiah Scott – sound designer, production, engineer, additional vocals on track 13
- Bruce Fitzhugh – additional vocals on track 6
- Ben Pearson – performer on tracks 1, 5, 11, and 13
- John Judkins – lap steel guitar on tracks 1, 2, 13b
- Dennis Sibeijn – art direction
