= Bloodlust (Through the Eyes of the Dead album) =

2005 studio album

Studio album by Through the Eyes of the Dead
- Released: October 25, 2005
- Genre: Deathcore, melodic death metal
- Length: 37:54
- Label: Prosthetic
- Producer: Jamie King

Through the Eyes of the Dead chronology
Annihilation of Expectation (2005)	Bloodlust (2005)	Malice (2007)

Bloodlust is the debut studio album by American deathcore band Through the Eyes of the Dead, released on October 25, 2005, through Prosthetic Records. Following the release of a demo and an EP, the band issued Bloodlust, an album recognized as a synthesis of deathcore and melodic death metal, the latter of which drew comparisons to acts such as At the Gates and The Black Dahlia Murder. Prior to the formal establishment of the deathcore genre, the album was often classified as metalcore due to its integration of melodeath elements with occasional hardcore-inspired breakdowns. Lyrically, the album was inspired by serial killers, featuring poetic narratives and vivid imagery. The band cited Cannibal Corpse, Carcass, Death, In Flames, At the Gates, and Dark Tranquility as key influences.

Bloodlust received critical acclaim, with reviewers highlighting its guitar work and vocal performance. Through the Eyes of the Dead promoted the album by posting an MP3 of the song "Two Inches from a Main Artery" on August 9, 2005 and releasing a music video for the song in June 2006. The band toured during September and early October with Ion Dissonance, The Red Death and Summer's End. Through the Eyes of the Dead then toured with bands like In Flames and Trivium during the Sounds of the Underground tour in summer 2006. In early 2007, the original vocalist Anthony Gunnells was removed from the band because he did not show up to practice or write new lyrics for the next album.

== Background ==
After signing to Lovelost Records and releasing the EP The Scar of Ages in January 2004, Through the Eyes of the Dead attracted a cult following. The band then went on to perform shows with labelmates One Dead Three Wounded. Through the Eyes of the Dead got signed by Prosthetic Records in 2005, and released a split in July with melodic death band The Knife Trade. Jamie King produced Bloodlust, and Paul Romano designed the artwork for the album cover.

== Musical style and lyrics ==
Before the deathcore label was coined, Bloodlust was described as a metalcore album. Lambgoat writer Ash Levitt described Bloodlust as "metalcore that emphasizes the metal aspect over the core part", noting that the album has less emphasis on breakdowns than many of Through the Eyes of the Dead's contemporaries do. Later, Bloodlust was described as deathcore with strong elements of melodic death metal. This caused Bloodlust to blend in with all the metalcore bands that were popular at the time before deathcore became more widespread. Alternative Press noted this and wrote: "Finding a place between hardcore breakdowns and death metal's pure-speed style, the album contains all the elements commonly found today. However, it was brought forth in a different way that sounds like a product of its time." Metal Injection compared Bloodlust to melodic death metal bands like At the Gates and The Black Dahlia Murder: "On debut full-length Bloodlust," Through the Eyes of the Dead "were simply one of the hordes of metalcore bands aping At the Gates a la The Black Dahlia Murder." Chelsea Muller of the Phoenix New Times compared Bloodlust to Swedish melodic death metal band In Flames, especially the guitar riffs. In a 2005 interview, Through the Eyes of the Dead mentioned Cannibal Corpse, Carcass, Death, At the Gates, In Flames and Dark Tranquility as influences. In a 2005 interview, Through the Eyes of the Dead described itself as a melodic death metal band. Vocalist Anthony Gunnells, known for his high-pitched shrieks on the album, typically wrote poetic lyrics inspired by serial killers through the use of stories and imagery. Describing the lyrics, Knac.com writer Peter Atkinson wrote that "Bloodlust reads like something you might imagine in Ted Bundy's journal", citing the lyrics depicting violence against women in "Truest Shades of Crimson" as an example.

== Touring, release and promotion ==
Bloodlust was released on October 25, 2005, and the song "Two Inches from a Main Artery" was posted online as an MP3 on August 9, 2005. In September, the band was planning to record a music video for the song to promote the album. Nonetheless, the plan did not happen that month and the band instead recorded the music video for "Two Inches from a Main Artery" on April 11, 2006. The music video was directed by Jonathan Covert and footage was shot in downtown Los Angeles, California. The music video for "Two Inches from a Main Artery" was released on YouTube in June 2006. Throughout September and early October 2005, Through the Eyes of the Dead toured throughout the United States with bands like Ion Dissonance, Summer's End and The Red Death. Through the Eyes of the Dead toured from March to May 2006 with bands like Children of Bodom, God Forbid, Chimaira, Cephalic Carnage, A Life Once Lost and Scarlet. After that, Through the Eyes of the Dead was involved in the summer 2006 Sounds of the Underground tour with bands like In Flames and Trivium. Gunnells was fired from the band in early 2007. Guitarist Justin Longshore explained: "We just never really wanted to put the band in jeopardy, but he was [not] showing up to practice, and he didn’t have any lyrics written for the new record. So we just decided to find someone more serious and dedicated. We were really left with no choice."

== Critical reception ==
Peter Atkinson of Knac.com praised the album and gave it an A−: "Death metal is rarely accused of being smart, but these nightmarish Carolinians are, and fiendishly so." Ash Levitt of Lambgoat, despite his dislike towards many of Through the Eyes of the Dead's metalcore contemporaries, praised the album as an exception, calling it "a very solid release that demonstrates there is still hope for" metalcore. Nonetheless, he preferred the band's recordings prior to Bloodlust and wrote that the band should have explored more with their musical style. Levitt praised songs like "Beneath Dying Skies" and "When Everything Becomes Nothing" the most, but wrote that the other songs on Bloodlust, "while not being poor by any stretch of the imagination, are also not exactly outstanding". Despite this, Levitt called Bloodlust "well done". Alternative Press included Bloodlust in its list of its thirty favorite 2000s deathcore albums. Chelsea Muller of The Phoenix New Times praised the vocals, guitar work, and drumming on Bloodlust.

== Track listing ==
No.	Title	Length
1.	"Intro"	0:55
2.	"Two Inches from a Main Artery"	5:27
3.	"When Everything Becomes Nothing"	4:56
4.	"Bringer of Truth"	3:53
5.	"Beneath Dying Skies"	2:53
6.	"The Black Death and Its Aftermath"	1:33
7.	"Truest Shade of Crimson"	6:17
8.	"With Eyes Ever Turned Inward"	4:21
9.	"Force Fed Trauma"	5:24
10.	"The Decaying Process"	1:34
11.	"Outro"	0:41
Total length:		37:54

== Personnel ==
Through the Eyes of the Dead

- Anthony Gunnells – vocals
- Justin Longshore – guitar
- Chris Anderson – guitar
- Jeff Springs – bass
- Dayton Cantley – drums

Additional credits

- All music written and arranged by Through the Eyes of the Dead
- All lyrics written by Anthony Gunnells
- Additional vocals on "Beneath Dying Skies" by Damon Welch
