= Dulling Occams Razor =

EP by Found Dead Hanging
- Released: July 15, 2003
- Genres: Mathcore, hardcore punk, grindcore, sludge metal
- Label: Black Market Activities (BMA003-2)

Found Dead Hanging chronology
Dulling Occams Razor (2003)	All Is Not Lost (2007)

Dulling Occams Razor is the only EP by the American extreme metal band Found Dead Hanging before changing their name to Architect. It was released along with Bare As Bones by Backstabbers Incorporated and Deadwater Drowning by Deadwater Drowning as the inaugural releases of Black Market Activities on July 15, 2003.

In philosophy, Occam's Razor is the meta-theoretical principle that the simplest solution is usually the correct one.

== Track listing ==
Dulling Occams Razor
No.	Title	Length
1.	"Solar Powered Sun Destroyer"	2:58
2.	"Taking Stock Portfolio Advice from Martha Stewart"	2:39
3.	"With the Lack of Faith in the World and the Recent Fluctuations in Gas Prices... It Wouldn't Surprise Me If Hell Ran on Propane"	3:38
4.	"A .45 Caliber Defribulator…A Prototype of Sorts"	1:26
5.	"It's Hard to Hail a Cab While Holding Yourself At Gunpoint"	2:06
6.	"With Rapid Fire Mutant Death Ray"	2:38
Total length:		21:36
