= In Love with the End =

Studio album by Born from Pain
- Released: April 19, 2005
- Genre: Metalcore; hardcore punk
- Length: 34:23
- Label: Metal Blade

Born from Pain chronology
Sands of Time (2003)	In Love with the End (2005)	War (2006)

Professional ratings
Review scores
Source	Rating
Aversion Online	(7/10)
Metaleater.com	(7/10)

In Love with the End is the third studio album by the Dutch hardcore/metalcore band Born from Pain, released on 19 April 2005 by Metal Blade.

== Critical reception ==
Marty Ogilvie, reviewing In Love with the End for Metaleater.com, calls the band's performance on the record "solid, hardcore machine, not missing a beat as they pummel the listener into submission" and not "wasting any time getting their point across—they hit you hard and fast, and then move on". Although the album is relatively short, Ogilvie doubts that "many people would be able to handle it", if the album was any longer, because it's "non-stop hardcore onslaugh".

Ogilvie got impressed by the "killer timekeeping" on "Judgement" and the double-bass drum work, while also admiring "Dead Code"'s slows, sludgy, Black Sabbath-like intro.

== Track listing ==
1. "Rise or Die" – 3:23
2. "Judgement" – 3:02
3. "The New Hate" – 3:25
4. "Kill It Tonight" – 3:35
5. "Renewal" – 2:22 (feat. Jacob Bredahl, ex Hatesphere, Barcode)
6. "Fear This World" – 2:52
7. "Raging Heart" – 3:30
8. "Dead Code" – 4:53
9. "Suicide Nations" – 3:11
10. "Hour of the Wolf" – 4:10

== Personnel ==
- Ché Snelting – vocals
- Stefan van Neerven – guitar
- Karl Fieldhouse – guitar
- Rob Franssen – bass guitar
- Roel Klomp – drums
