= Ghost of the Salt Water Machines =

Studio album by Architect
- Released: November 25, 2008
- Genre: Hardcore punk, mathcore, metalcore, noise rock
- Label: Black Market Activities (BMA030)

Architect chronology
All Is Not Lost (2007)	Ghost of the Salt Water Machines (2008)

Professional ratings
Review scores
Source	Rating
Allmusic	3.5/5 stars
Collector's Guide to Heavy Metal	7/10

Ghost of the Salt Water Machines is the second full-length album from American hardcore band Architect. It was released on Black Market Activities on November 25, 2008. Ghost of the Salt Water Machines was also the name of the band prior to changing to Architect.

== Track listing ==
No.	Title	Length
1.	"Camelot in Smithereens"	4:55
2.	"Uninventing the Wheel"	3:45
3.	"Lamplighter"	3:13
4.	"Death and Taxes"	4:16
5.	"Casus Belli"	1:27
6.	"I Am Become Death"	5:50
7.	"House of 1,000 Habeus Corpses"	3:02
8.	"The Dog and Pony Show"	5:36
9.	"Traitor"	6:41
