= Survival (Born from Pain album) =

Studio album by Born from Pain
- Released: November 11, 2008
- Genre: Hardcore punk, tough guy hardcore
- Length: 34:11
- Label: Metal Blade

Born from Pain chronology
War (2006)	Survival (2008)	The New Future (2012)

Professional ratings
Review scores
Source	Rating
Metal Underground	3/5 stars

Survival is the fifth studio album by the Dutch hardcore band Born from Pain. It was released in 2008 on Metal Blade Records.

== Track list ==
No.	Title	Length
1.	"Sound of Survival"	4:10
2.	"State of Mind"	2:22
3.	"Sons of a Dying World"	2:56
4.	"The Wolves Are Loose"	2:58
5.	"Never Die"	3:07
6.	"Final Collapse"	5:27
7.	"Endgame"	2:12
8.	"Zeitgeist"	2:29
9.	"The Hydra"	2:47
10.	"Zero Hour"	2:52
11.	"Under False Flag"	2:51
