= Devour the Power =

2006 album by Destroy Destroy Destroy

Studio album by Destroy Destroy Destroy
- Released: September 5, 2006
- Genre: Melodic death metal, power metal, symphonic black metal, viking metal
- Length: 39:46
- Label: Black Market Activities
- Producer: Jeremiah Scott

Destroy Destroy Destroy chronology
Devour the Power (2006)	Battle Sluts (2009)

Devour the Power is the debut album by American heavy metal band Destroy Destroy Destroy.

== Track listing ==
No.	Title	Length
1.	"The Summoning"	1:15
2.	"Hang the Vermin"	4:15
3.	"Gods of War and Open Sores"	3:40
4.	"Ripped Apart by the Juggernaut of Fornification"	3:23
5.	"Battle Cry"	4:00
6.	"Eternal Voyage of the Geishmal Undead"	1:04
7.	"The Beast That Cannot Be Fed"	3:40
8.	"Mutilated Cranial Orifice"	2:30
9.	"Seduced by the Locrian Temptress"	4:32
10.	"Hellfire"	5:27
11.	"Bring on the Exodus"	6:00

== Personnel ==
- Bryan Kemp - lead vocals, art direction, design
- Jeremiah Scott - guitar
- Way Barrier - guitar
- Adam Phillips - bass guitar
- Eric W. Brown - drums
- Alex Gillette - keyboards

Production

- Jeremiah Scott - producer, engineering, mixing
- Nicholas Zampiello - engineering, mastering
- Greg Smith - photography
