= Fed Through the Teeth Machine =

Studio album by The Red Chord
- Released: October 27, 2009
- Genre: Deathgrind, deathcore
- Length: 35:22
- Label: Metal Blade
- Producer: The Red Chord

The Red Chord chronology
| Prey for Eyes (2007) | Fed Through the Teeth Machine (2009) |

Singles from Fed Through the Teeth Machine
- 1. "Demoralizer" Released: October 13, 2009

Fed Through the Teeth Machine is the fourth studio album by the American band The Red Chord, released October 27, 2009. The album was self-produced by the band and was mixed and mastered by Chris "Zeuss" Harris. Fed Through the Teeth Machine sold more than 2,700 copies in the United States in its first week of release and debuted at No. 180 on the Billboard 200 chart.

== Background ==
Kozowyk explained the album title: "It's from the Discovery Channel show How It's Made. They were talking about this machine they feed zippers through, but we just thought the name was creepy."

Guitarist Mike "Gunface" McKenzie commented: "We spent the last year working hard on this one and we're excited for everyone to finally hear it. It's a lot faster and, in my opinion, more straight-forward in a structural sense. We're really happy with the great work Jonny Fay and Zeuss did, too. It's not a concept record, but there are some loose conceptual elements to it: hygienic obsession, delusional compound-dwellers and Maniac Mansion."

Fed Through the Teeth Machine sold around 2,700 copies in the United States in its first week of release and debuted at No. 180 on the Billboard 200 chart. The Red Chord also debuted at No. 34 on the Billboard Hard Music chart and No. 6 on the Billboard Heatseeker chart. Fed Through the Teeth Machine cracked the Neilson Sound Scan charts in Canada coming in at No. 57 on the Independent charts and No. 70 on the Hard charts.

== Reception ==
Professional ratings
Review scores
| Source | Rating |
|---|---|
| About.com | 4/5 stars |
| AllMusic | 3.5/5 stars |
| Alternative Press | 4/5 stars |
| Blabbermouth.net | 9/10 stars |
| Decibel | 8/10 stars |
| Exclaim! | (favorable) |
| Fangoria | 3.5/4 stars |
| PopMatters | 7/10 stars |
| Rock Sound | 8/10 stars |

Revolver stated about the album: "The foursome's fierce attack is as brutal as ever...what could well be a bunch of noise in the hands of lesser headbangers is intricate and engrossing on Teeth Machine, whether it's the twisting tempo shifts of 'Demoralizer' or the blazing twin guitar attacks on 'Hymns and Crippled Anthems'."

Decibel commented the album: "...there's a definite stamp of intent on Fed Through the Teeth Machine; there are more dynamics, more variety, a wider swath of sound being used in conjunction with the band's brand of grind/death/core. Opener 'Demoralizer' is an excellent grinder with solid rhythms and a smooth integration of breathy string bends that are almost psychedelic. The next track, 'Hour of Rats', utilizes a unique scalar shuffle with equal amounts melody and crunch. There are moments when Fed Through is angrier than a hornet's nest, faster than Usain Bolt with diarrhea, and weird as that guy talking to himself on the street corner, but still as smart as a college professor and groovier than the skin around grandma's eyes."

The Daily News McKeesport stated: "Massachusetts' tech-death/hardcore muck and grinders The Red Chord developed the template for their sound, only to watch a million other bands copy it. Big surprise, huh? Well, the joke's on the newcomers, because The Red Chord still do it far better, which they prove beyond a shadow of doubt on their fourth album."

CraveOnline stated that "Fed Through the Teeth Machine is a capable and well-executed grindcore record from a band that understands what the genre is all about."

== Track listing ==
| No. | Title | Length |
|---|---|---|
| 1. | "Demoralizer" | 2:32 |
| 2. | "Hour of Rats" | 2:40 |
| 3. | "Hymns and Crippled Anthems" | 2:55 |
| 4. | "Embarrassment Legacy" | 3:00 |
| 5. | "Tales of Martyrs and Disappearing Acts" | 2:09 |
| 6. | "Floating Through the Vein" | 3:15 |
| 7. | "Ingest the Ash" | 2:39 |
| 8. | "One Robot to Another" | 2:17 |
| 9. | "Mouthful of Precious Stones" | 4:21 |
| 10. | "The Ugliest Truth" | 2:42 |
| 11. | "Face Area Solution" (featuring Vincent Bennett) | 2:01 |
| 12. | "Sleepless Nights in the Compound" | 4:51 |
| Total length: | | 35:22 |

== Personnel ==
The Red Chord

- Guy Kozowyk – lead vocals
- Mike "Gunface" McKenzie – guitar, backing vocals
- Greg Weeks – bass guitar
- Brad Fickeisen – drums

Featurettes

- Vincent Bennett (of The Acacia Strain) – additional vocals on "Face Area Solution"

Production

- The Red Chord – production
- Jonny Fay – recording engineer
- Chris "Zeuss" Harris – mixing and mastering
- Michael J. Windsor – album artwork
