= Delenda =

Studio album by From a Second Story Window
- Released: July 11, 2006
- Recorded: March 2006
- Studio: More Sound Studios
- Genres: Progressive metalcore; mathcore; deathcore
- Length: 42:23
- Labels: Black Market Activities; Metal Blade
- Producers: Jason "Jocko" Randall; From a Second Story Window

From a Second Story Window chronology
Not One Word Has Been Omitted (2003)	Delenda (2006)	Conversations (2008)

Professional ratings
Review scores
Source	Rating
AllMusic	3/5 stars
Lambgoat	5/10

Delenda is the debut album by the progressive metalcore/mathcore band From a Second Story Window. This is the band's first release with vocalist Will Jackson and final release to feature lead guitarist and songwriter Derek Vasconi.

A music video was released for the song "These Lights Above Us".

== Track listing ==
All tracks are written by From a Second Story Window.

No.	Title	Length
1.	"Acknowledgement"	3:09
2.	"Soft Green Fields"	4:59
3.	"A Piece of History Written in English"	2:36
4.	"Dark Waters of Thought"	3:09
5.	"Oracles and Doorsteps" (featuring Billy Bottom of Nights Like These)	4:30
6.	"For Those Lost"	2:41
7.	"The Crusher"	5:12
8.	"Ghosts Over Japan"	3:36
9.	"These Lights Above Us"	4:21
10.	"Mourning for Morning"	8:05
Total length:		42:23

== Personnel ==
From a Second Story Window

- Will Jackson - vocals
- Derek Vasconi - lead guitar
- Rob Hileman - rhythm guitar
- Joe Sudrovic - bass
- Nick Huffman - drums

Additional personnel

- Jocko – engineering, mixing, mastering
- Eric "The Mook" Bukowski – additional engineering and mastering
- Jason Fiske – artwork and design
- Billy Bottom – additional vocals on track 5
