= Prey for Eyes =

Studio album by The Red Chord
- Released: July 24, 2007
- Genres: Deathcore, deathgrind, technical death metal
- Length: 45:46
- Label: Metal Blade
- Producers: The Red Chord, Eric Rachel

The Red Chord chronology
Clients (2005)	Prey for Eyes (2007)	Fed Through the Teeth Machine (2009)

Professional ratings
Review scores
Source	Rating
Blabbermouth.net	8/10 stars
Punknews.org	4/5 stars

Prey for Eyes is the third full-length album by American band, The Red Chord. It is the second album that the band has released on Metal Blade Records. The album was produced by Eric Rachel at Trax East (Every Time I Die, A Life Once Lost) and features artwork by Paul Romano (Trivium, Mastodon, Maroon).

== Background information ==
Band frontman Guy Kozowyk had the following to say:

Inspired by events where my brother, who is a prison guard, walks in on an inmate doing something ridiculous in his cell. The prisoner won’t talk and gets into this dialogue via a notepad. After documenting that he can no longer talk because the devil removed his tongue, my brother checks the con's mouth with his flashlight. When he tells him that his tongue is definitely intact, the inmate replies with the cryptic message "Pray for Eyes".

The album debuted at #198 on the Billboard 200 with sales of about 4,000 – 5,000 copies and at #3 on the Heatseekers Chart.

== Track listing ==
No.	Title	Length
1.	"Film Critiques and Militia Men"	1:04
2.	"Dread Prevailed"	3:16
3.	"It Runs in the Family"	2:08
4.	"Send the Death Storm"	3:25
5.	"Pray For Eyes"	4:33
6.	"Responsibles"	3:42
7.	"Midas Touch"	2:38
8.	"Tread on the Necks of Kings"	3:08
9.	"It Came from Over There" (Instrumental)	4:16
10.	"Intelligence Has Been Compromised"	2:44
11.	"Open Eyed Beast Attack"	2:37
12.	"Birdbath"	2:25
13.	"Bone Needle"	3:39
14.	"Seminar"	6:18
Total length:		45:46

"Dread Prevailed" was included in the Saw IV soundtrack.

Exclusive European bonus tracks and videos

No.	Title	Length
1.	"Antman" (live at SOTU, USA)
2.	"Blue line" (live at SOTU, USA)
3.	"Bread Pants"
4.	"Black Santa" (Live at Indep. Day, JP)
5.	"Ugly" (Live at Indep. Day, JP)
6.	"Dreaming in Dog Years" (Live at Indep. Day, JP))
7.	"Pile UP" (Live at Big Daddy’s Tallahassee, US)

== Personnel ==
=== The Red Chord ===
- Guy Kozowyk – vocals
- Mike "Gunface" McKenzie – lead guitar, backing vocals
- Greg Weeks – bass guitar, backing vocals (track 5), percussion (track 14)
- Brad Fickeisen – drums, backing vocals (track 5)
- Jonny Fay – rhythm guitar, backing vocals (track 5), percussion (track 14)

=== Additional personnel ===
- Jonny Davy – vocals (track 2, 5)
- Nate Newton – vocals (track 6, 8)
- Mirai Kawashima – keyboards, Moog synthesizer, composition, arrangement (track 9)
- Bob Carpenter, Nick Frasca – backing vocals (track 5)
- Michael Keller – backing vocals (track 5), percussion (track 14)
- Eric Rachel – production, engineering, mixing, backing vocals (track 5)
- Paul Romano – art direction, artwork, design
- Eric Kvortek, Kyle Neeley – engineering
- Nick Zampiello – mastering
