= Gaza (band) =

American mathcore band

- Origin: Salt Lake City, Utah, U.S.
- Genres: Grindcore, mathcore, sludge metal, noisecore, metalcore, hardcore punk
- Years active: 2004–2013
- Label: Black Market Activities
- Spinoffs: Cult Leader
- Past members: Casey Hansen; Anthony Lucero; Michael Mason; Jon Parkin; Chris Clement; Dustin Dransfield; Dreu Hudson; Matt Nanes; Luke Sorenson
- Website: gazamusic.net (defunct)

Gaza was an American mathcore band from Salt Lake City, Utah.

Formed in 2004, they were signed to Black Market Activities and released one extended play and three albums. They are known for their "abrasive style of chaotic metalcore with heavy doses of grind, noisecore, and sludge", as well as their outspoken anti-religious and political views.

== History ==
The band formed in Salt Lake City intending to be an indie rock band but, according to frontman Jon Parkin, that "lasted about half a practice". According to Parkin, the band was named after "perhaps the most obvious example of religious turmoil," and he said "we don’t affiliate ourselves with either side of the conflict."

The original lineup consisted of Casey Hansen on drums, Parkin on bass, and Michael Mason and Luke Sorenson on guitars. With this lineup they played their first two shows with different vocalists – first with Dustin Dransfield and then with Dreu Hudson. After their departure, Parkin switched to lead vocals, and bass player Matt Nanes was added. With this lineup, the band recorded their debut EP East in 2004, which was distributed by Exigent Records.

Nanes left the band after the EP release, and Chris Clement joined as bass player.

In 2006, the band signed to label Black Market Activities, on which they have released I Don't Care Where I Go When I Die.

Clement was unable to tour and turned bassist role fully over to Bird Eater band mate Anthony Lucero, who retained the spot for the duration of the project. Gaza’s new permanent lineup recorded He Is Never Coming Back. After the release of He Is Never Coming Back, Sorenson left the band, leaving them as a four-piece group. The final lineup recorded No Absolutes in Human Suffering.

In late 2012, an unnamed woman alleged that a member of Gaza had raped her, later identifying the member as vocalist Jon Parkin. In January 2013, the band posted a statement denying the allegations and the matter was later resolved by the two parties. Despite resolving the issue, the band later announced that it would be breaking up, with the other members citing tension between them and Parkin. Bassist Anthony Lucero stated:

It started to become really frustrating, and tours were getting cancelled, and all kinds of stuff was happening, so when that stupid, horrible shit blew up on the Internet, then it had reached the point where the three of us said that we'd had enough of this, it's done, and so we decided to actually kick Jon [Parkin] out of the band. Then we sat with Gaza for a while, trying to figure out what we were going to do, and eventually it felt like the only right thing to do was just start from scratch.

In May 2013, Michael Mason, Casey Hansen and Anthony Lucero started a new band called Cult Leader.

== Band members ==
=== Final lineup ===
- Jon Parkin – vocals (2004–2013), bass (2004)
- Michael Mason – guitar (2004–2013) (now in Cult Leader)
- Casey Hansen – drums (2004–2013) (now in Cult Leader)
- Anthony Lucero – bass (2006–2013) (now in Cult Leader)

=== Former members ===
- Dustin Dransfield – vocals (2004)
- Dreu Hudson – vocals (2004)
- Matt Nanes – bass (2004–2005)
- Chris Clement – bass (2004, 2005–2006)
- Luke Sorenson – guitar (2004–2009)

== Discography ==
Studio albums

- I Don't Care Where I Go When I Die (2006)
- He Is Never Coming Back (2009)
- No Absolutes in Human Suffering (2012)

Extended plays

- East (2004)

== See also ==
- List of Black Market Activities artists
- List of grindcore bands
- List of mathcore bands
- List of Utah musical groups
- Music of Utah
