= Skepsis (album) =

Studio album by Through the Eyes of the Dead
- Released: February 2, 2010
- Recorded: 2009
- Genre: Deathcore, technical death metal
- Length: 40:45
- Label: Prosthetic
- Producer: Eliot Geller, Through the Eyes of the Dead

Through the Eyes of the Dead chronology
Malice (2007)	Skepsis (2010)	Disomus (2017)

Professional ratings
Review scores
Source	Rating
AllMusic	3.5/5 stars
Blabbermouth.net	7.5/10

Skepsis is the third studio album by American deathcore band Through the Eyes of the Dead. This is the band's first album to feature vocalist Danny Rodriguez, drummer Michael Ranne and the only one to feature guitarist Chris Henckel.

This album leaves most of the band's original deathcore sound found on their debut album behind in favor of expanding their horizons into technical death metal.

== Track listing ==
No.	Title	Length
1.	"Parasite Throne"	0:53
2.	"Dementia"	4:15
3.	"No Haven"	4:47
4.	"Perpetual Defilement"	3:44
5.	"Inherit Obscurity"	4:59
6.	"The Manifest"	4:59
7.	"Defaced Reality"	5:10
8.	"Siphonaptera From Within"	4:34
9.	"Insomnium"	2:44
10.	"Skepsis"	4:40
Total length:		40:45

== Personnel ==
Through the Eyes of the Dead

- Danny Rodriguez – vocals
- Justin Longshore – guitar
- Chris Henckel – guitar
- Jake Ososkie – bass
- Michael Ranne – drums
