= Clients (album) =

Studio album by The Red Chord
- Released: May 17, 2005
- Genres: Deathcore, technical death metal, grindcore
- Length: 36:20
- Label: Metal Blade
- Producers: The Red Chord, Zeuss

The Red Chord chronology
Fused Together in Revolving Doors (2002)	Clients (2005)	Prey for Eyes (2007)

Professional ratings
Review scores
Source	Rating
AllMusic	3.5/5 stars
Blabbermouth.net	8/10
Exclaim!	(not rated)
Punknews.org	4/5 stars
Stylus Magazine	B+

Clients is the second studio album by American heavy metal band The Red Chord. It was released on May 17, 2005 via Metal Blade Records.

In 2021, Joe Smith-Engelhardt of Alternative Press included the album in his list of "30 deathcore albums from the 2000s that define the genre". In 2024, Metal Injection included the album in their list of "10 Deathcore Albums That Aged Incredibly Well".

== Concept ==
The title of the album was originally derived from an in-joke and story between Guy Kozowyk's family and friends, referring to the mentally disabled students for whom a member of Kozowyk's family drove a bus. This term eventually spread out to mean anybody for whom one provided service. The title reflects the songs, as the songs are stories from and about "clients", or mentally disabled people, with whom Kozowyk has had experience working in a convenience store located next to a psychiatric rehabilitation/hospital.

Each song is a different "client", or a different person with a mental ailment, ranging from schizophrenia, to multiple personality disorder, to extreme obsessive compulsive disorder. The song "Black Santa" would best describe the album and its meanings, as it actually depicts everything that is used as an inspiration in the album: Kozowyk's job, the people he encountered, the stories he heard, and the notion that everybody both has and is a "client", meaning everybody works for somebody, and that everybody is not entirely mentally stable.

== Music videos ==
The Red Chord released four music videos and singles from Clients. "Antman", the first single, was directed by David Brodsky of My Good Eye and notably features live ants crawling on Greg Weeks, the band's bassist. It had the honor of being the most played video on MTV2's Headbangers Ball in 2005. "Blue Line Cretin" was directed by acclaimed artist Paul Romano (who designed the "Clients" CD graphics). "Black Santa", again directed by David Brodsky, was shot on location at the notorious Manhattan nightclub, Crobar. The claymation "battle" between the Antman and Black Santa characters was executed by Randy Gordon-Gatica and conceived of by Guy, Randy and Brodsky. It was nominated for Best Video of 2006 on MTV2's Headbangers Ball. "Fixation on Plastics" was also shot as a video and is a performance-only video.

== Track listing ==
All tracks are written by The Red Chord.

No.	Title	Length
1.	"Fixation on Plastics"	2:44
2.	"Lay the Tarp"	3:12
3.	"Black Santa"	2:52
4.	"Antman"	3:07
5.	"Clients"	1:00
6.	"Upper Decker"	5:17
7.	"Hospice Residence"	3:14
8.	"Dragon Wagon"	3:01
9.	"Love on the Concrete"	2:57
10.	"Blue Line Cretin"	2:27
11.	"He Was Dead When I Got There" (instrumental)	6:29
Total length:		36:20

2006 deluxe edition bonus tracks
No.	Title	Length
12.	"7 Seconds of Screaming"	0:24
13.	"Antman (Live at Sounds of the Underground)"	3:11
14.	"Blue Line Cretin (Live at Sounds of the Underground)"	2:23
15.	"Bread Pants"	1:11
16.	"Black Santa (Live at Independence D in Tokyo)"	2:35
17.	"Ugly (Live at Independence D in Tokyo)"	2:51
18.	"Dreaming in Dog Years (Live at Independence D in Tokyo)"	3:12
19.	"Pile Up (Live at Big Daddy's in Tallahassee, FL)"	0:54
20.	"Lay the Tarp (Demo)"	3:10
21.	"Black Santa (Demo)"	2:32
22.	""Yeah We Did It!""	1:12

== Personnel ==
The Red Chord

- Brad Fickeisen – drums
- Guy Kozowyk – vocals
- Mike "Gunface" McKenzie – guitar, backing vocals
- Kevin Rampelberg – guitar
- Gregory Weeks – bass

Production and design

- Zeuss – Producer, engineer, mixer
- The Red Chord – co-producer
- Alan Douches – mastering
- Paul Romano – layout concept and design
