= Disomus =

Studio album by Through the Eyes of the Dead
- Released: October 13, 2017
- Genres: Death metal, deathcore
- Length: 39:08
- Labels: eOne, Good Fight
- Producer: Jamie King

Through the Eyes of the Dead chronology
Skepsis (2010)	Disomus (2017)

Singles from Disomus
- 1. "Hate the Living" Released: August 18, 2017; 2. "Obitual" Released: September 11, 2017

Disomus is the fourth studio album by American deathcore band Through the Eyes of the Dead. The album was released on October 13, 2017, via Entertainment One Music/Good Fight Music.

== Critical reception ==
Professional ratings
Review scores
Source	Rating
Beat Magazine	8/10
Distorted Sound	7/10
Exclaim!	5/10
Invicta Magazine	7.5/10
New Noise	4.5/5 stars
New Transcendence	9/10

Nicholas Senior of New Noise Magazine calls the album "a notable step up for the East Coast collective" in "how they’ve doubled down on the menace and brutality while expanding their sonic palate in all the right ways".

James Weaver of Distorted Sound Magazine states that "Intertwining riffing that ooze technicality from guitarists Steven Funderburk and Justin Longshore demonstrates the band’s skill whilst the combination of Michael Ranne‘s blasts from the drums and Danny Rodriguez‘s thunderous vocals pack a powerful punch".

== Track listing ==
No.	Title	Length
1.	"Hate the Living"	4:19
2.	"Obitual"	3:25
3.	"Haruspex"	3:25
4.	"Of Mortals, We Once Were"	3:37
5.	"The Binding Nightmare Hex"	4:43
6.	"Vortices in the Stygian Maelstrom"	4:02
7.	"Ignis"	1:39
8.	"Teras"	4:39
9.	"Till Solace, She'll Haunt"	4:17
10.	"Dismal"	4:34
Total length:		39:08

== Personnel ==
Through the Eyes of the Dead

- Danny Rodriguez – vocals
- Justin Longshore – guitar
- Steven Funderburk – guitar
- Jake Ososkie – bass
- Michael Ranne – drums
