= The Tony Danza Tapdance Extravaganza (album) =

Studio album by The Tony Danza Tapdance Extravaganza
- Released: August 9, 2005
- Studios: Twin Oak Productions, Murfreesboro, Tennessee
- Genres: Mathcore, grindcore
- Length: 28:39
- Label: Corrosive Recordings
- Producer: Jason Dietz

The Tony Danza Tapdance Extravaganza chronology
Thank You, Jason Dietz (demo) (2004)	The Tony Danza Tapdance Extravaganza (2005)	Danza II: The Electric Boogaloo (2007)

Professional ratings
Review scores
Source	Rating
Decoy Music	4/5 stars
Lambgoat	7/10

The Tony Danza Tapdance Extravaganza is the debut album by American mathcore band The Tony Danza Tapdance Extravaganza.

== Background ==
The Tony Danza Tapdance Extravaganza formed in 2004, releasing a demo that same year titled "Thank You, Jason Dietz", which was sold at early shows and showcased through PureVolume. In 2005, the band was signed to Corrosive Recordings. Corrosive would later release the debut album, which is essentially a re-release of the band's demo as it contains 7 of the group's 2004 demo songs with three additional tracks and different cover art.

== Track listing ==
All lyrics are written by Jessie Freeland; all music is composed by The Tony Danza Tapdance Extravaganza.

No.	Title	Length
1.	"My Bowling Ball's Frozen in a Footlocker in Chicago"	1:24
2.	"I Bet Heaven Looks Alot Like Talledega"	2:52
3.	"God Ain't Got No Use for No 180lb. Bag of Sugar"	2:25
4.	"5 Deep on Charlie"	2:59
5.	"Cliff Burton Surprise"	3:18
6.	"Bringin' It Straight from Alabama"	1:26
7.	"Bill Dance Lands the Big One"	3:10
8.	"Daddy's Coming Up"	2:47
9.	"Tony Little, Jack Daniels, and the Open Road"	2:22
10.	"Big Pun's Not Dead Because I Just Saw Him at Krispy Kreme" (song ends at 3:20, followed by 30 seconds of silence and a hidden rap track)	5:56

== Personnel ==
The Tony Danza Tapdance Extravaganza

- Jessie Freeland – vocals
- Brad Thomson – guitar
- Layne Meylain – guitar
- Mike Butler – bass
- Mason Crooks – drums

Additional

- Neil Dietz – additional vocals on track 1
- Jason Dietz – producer, audio engineer
- Nicholas Zampiello – mastering
