= War (Born from Pain album) =

Studio album by Born from Pain
- Released: November 17, 2006
- Recorded: August 2006 at Antfarm Studio in Denmark
- Genre: Metalcore
- Length: 43:41
- Label: Metal Blade
- Producer: Tue Madsen

Born from Pain chronology
| In Love with the End (2005) | War (2006) | Survival (2008) |

Professional ratings
Review scores
| Source | Rating |
|---|---|
| AllMusic | 3/5 stars |

War is the fourth studio album by the Dutch hardcore band Born from Pain. The album was released in 2006 on November 17 (Germany, Austria, Switzerland) and November 20 (rest of Europe) through Metal Blade Records.

== Track listing ==
| No. | Title | Length |
|---|---|---|
| 1. | "Relentless" | 3:37 |
| 2. | "Behind Enemy Lines" | 3:02 |
| 3. | "Stop at Nothing" | 2:54 |
| 4. | "Bury Me Fighting" | 4:43 |
| 5. | "Crusader" (feat. Jan-Chris de Koeijer of Gorefest) | 3:47 |
| 6. | "Grey Life" | 3:45 |
| 7. | "The War Is On" | 6:04 |
| 8. | "Scorched Earth" (feat. Peter "Pepe" Lyse Hansen of Hatesphere) | 2:03 |
| 9. | "Eyes of the World" | 4:04 |
| 10. | "Doomsday Clock" (feat. Lou Koller of Sick of It All) | 4:22 |
| 11. | "Iron Will" | 5:19 |
| 12. | "Behind Enemy Lines" (feat. Mark "Barney" Greenway of Napalm Death; European bonus track) | 3:09 |
| Total length: | | 43:41 |

== Personnel ==
Born from Pain

- Ché Snelting - vocals
- Karl Fieldhouse - guitars
- Dominik Stammen - guitars
- Rob Franssen - bass guitar
- Roel Klomp - drums

Guest musicians

- Jan-Chris de Koeijer - vocals on "Crusader"
- Mark "Barney" Greenway - vocals on "Behind Enemy Lines (alternate version)"
- Lou Koller - Vocals on "Doomsday Clock"
- Peter "Pepe" Lyse Hansen - vocals on "Scorched Earth"

Production

- Tue Madsen - producer, engineering, mixing, mastering
- René Natzel - art direction, design
