= All Is Not Lost =

Studio album by Architect
- Released: January 23, 2007
- Recorded: August 2006
- Genres: Mathcore, metalcore, sludge metal, hardcore punk
- Length: 30:25
- Label: Black Market Activities
- Producer: Eric Bukowski

Architect chronology
Dulling Occams Razor (2003)	All Is Not Lost (2007)	Ghost of the Salt Water Machines (2008)

All Is Not Lost is the first full-length album by Architect. It was released on January 23, 2007.

== Track listing ==
1. "The Awakening"
2. "Sic Semper Tyrannis"
3. "11"
4. "Trepanning for Oil"
5. "13"
6. "Hell of the Upsidedown Sinners"
7. "The End of It"
8. "Collapse the War Engine"
9. "33"
10. "Broke Dick Dog"
11. "The Giving Tree"

== Reception ==
Professional ratings
Review scores
Source	Rating
Allmusic	3.5/5 stars
Collector's Guide to Heavy Metal	9/10
Decibel	favorable
Stylus	B+

The album was described by Decibel as a "startlingly accomplished debut", while Stylus commented that the band's "rhythms resemble the speech patterns of a screaming match".
