= He Is Never Coming Back =

Studio album by Gaza
- Released: November 10, 2009
- Studios: The Boars Nest, Salt Lake City, Utah
- Genres: Mathcore; sludge metal; metalcore; hardcore punk
- Length: 51:16
- Label: Black Market Activities
- Producer: Andy Patterson

Gaza chronology
I Don't Care Where I Go When I Die (2006)	He Is Never Coming Back (2009)	No Absolutes in Human Suffering (2012)

Professional ratings
Review scores
Source	Rating
About.com	3/5 stars
AllMusic	3.5/5 stars
Decoy Music	4/5 stars
Lambgoat	8/10

He Is Never Coming Back is the second studio album by American hardcore band Gaza. The album was originally released on November 10, 2009 through Black Market Activities. A vinyl version of the album was released on October 25, 2012. It is Gaza's last album with guitarist Luke Sorenson, and the first release by the band with bassist Anthony Lucero.

== Track listing ==
No.	Title	Length
1.	"How It Is. How It Is Going to Be."	4:31
2.	"The Kicking Legs"	2:56
3.	"Bishop"	3:05
4.	"The Biologist" (instrumental)	0:49
5.	"Windowless House"	1:56
6.	"He Is Never Coming Back"	2:07
7.	"Canine Disposal Unit"	4:21
8.	"The Anthropologist" (instrumental)	0:39
9.	"The Meat of a Leg Joint"	3:20
10.	"The Astronomer"	2:35
11.	"Tombless"	3:53
12.	"The Historian" (instrumental)	1:02
13.	"Carnivore"	4:06
14.	Untitled (instrumental)	15:56
Total length:		51:16

- Note: The iTunes store lists the title of track 14 as simply "(no title)".

== Personnel ==
Gaza

- Jon Parkin – vocals
- Michael Mason – guitar
- Luke Sorenson – guitar
- Anthony "Tino" Lucero – bass
- Casey Hansen – drums

Production

- Andrew "Andy" Patterson – engineering and mixing
- Gaza – mixing
- Nick Zampiello – mastering
- Joshn Wingar – layout design and artwork
