= Feast of the Blood Monsters =

Studio album by Dance Club Massacre
- Released: June 6, 2006
- Recorded: 2006
- Studios: Evil Plan to Record the World Studios, Chicago
- Genres: Deathcore, mathcore
- Length: 28:17
- Labels: Independent release (Original 2006); Black Market Activities/Metal Blade (2007 Reissue)
- Producer: Eric Butkus

Dance Club Massacre chronology
Demo (2005)	Feast of the Blood Monsters (2006)	Circle of Death (2008)

Professional ratings
Review scores
Source	Rating
AllMusic	link

Feast of the Blood Monsters is the debut studio album by Dance Club Massacre, recorded and originally released on June 6, 2006. It was reissued on July 10. 2007.

== Release and information ==
The band originally self–produced Feast of the Blood Monsters and released it onto Interpunk on June 6, 2006, but only limited to 1,100 copies. The album reached on Interpunk's list of top 50 best sold items selling all of its copies and they subsequently signed to Black Market Activities who then reissued and remastered the album and released it with new artwork on July 10, 2007.

The album features many popular culture references throughout such as how track 10 is a quote from the film Home Alone, the female screaming audio clip in "Murders Come with Smiles" is from the film The Blair Witch Project and the end of the album features an audio sample from Mortal Kombat II.

== Track listing ==
1. "Dios Mio! el Diablo es Muy Picante" – 2:05
2. "Meet Me in the Pub for a Shot of Dignity" – 0:51
3. "Devon Butler's Dying Wishes" – 1:07
4. "You Know... You Kind of Look Cute in the Dark" – 4:46
5. "Wet Between the Thighs" – 1:52
6. "Murders Come with Smiles" – 5:04
7. "The Duchess and the Cougar" – 2:14
8. "Showdown in San Antonio" – 4:19
9. "You'll Bring the Bitches, I'll Bring the Dynamite" – 1:22
10. "You're What the French Call 'Les Incompetents'" – 4:37

== Personnel ==
- Nick Seger – vocals
- Mitch Hein – guitars
- Chris Mrozek – bass
- Jon Caruso – drums
- Matt Hynek – keyboards
