= I Don't Care Where I Go When I Die =

Studio album by Gaza
- Released: October 3, 2006
- Genres: Grindcore; mathcore; noisecore; metalcore; sludge metal
- Length: 50:00
- Label: Black Market Activities/Metal Blade
- Producer: Nicholas Zampiello

Gaza chronology
East (2004)	I Don't Care Where I Go When I Die (2006)	He Is Never Coming Back (2009)

I Don't Care Where I Go When I Die is the debut studio album by American hardcore band Gaza. The album was released on October 3, 2006 through Black Market Activities and Metal Blade Records. It is the last release by the band with bassist Chris Clement.

== Critical reception ==
Professional ratings
Review scores
Source	Rating
AllMusic	4/5 stars
Lambgoat	7/10

Max Deneau of Exclaim! praised the album, stating that the band "left an otherwise mediocre year for Metal Blade and its subsidiaries on a much more positive, extremely atonal note."

Stewart Mason of AllMusic said that the album sounded "genuinely scary in a way that many grindcore bands would never be able to manage."

== Track listing ==
No.	Title	Length
1.	"Calf"	2:23
2.	"I Don't Care Where I Go When I Die"	1:18
3.	"Hospital Fat Bags"	6:56
4.	"Gristle"	4:17
5.	"Sire"	4:58
6.	"Slutmaker"	3:05
7.	"Hell Crown"	4:07
8.	"Moth"	4:16
9.	"Cult" (feat. Trevor Strnad of The Black Dahlia Murder)	4:44
10.	"Pork Finder"	6:49
11.	Untitled (Unlisted track)	7:07
Total length:		50:00

== Personnel ==
Gaza

- Jon Parkin – vocals
- Michael Mason – guitar
- Luke Sorenson – guitar
- Casey Hansen – drums
- Chris Clement – bass

Additional personnel

- Nicholas Zampiello – production and mastering
- Trevor Strnad – additional vocals on track 9
