= Paria (band) =

American experimental metal band

- Origin: Omaha, Nebraska, United States
- Genres: Experimental metal, progressive metal, grindcore, mathcore, nu metal (early)
- Years active: 2001–2010, 2021-present
- Labels: Black Market Activities; Imagine It Records
- Members: Corey Barnes; John Claus; Brian Craig; Dustin Treinen
- Past members: Andrew Gustafson; Aaron Langan; Eric Schnee
- Website: Official MySpace

Paria is an American experimental metal band formed in 2001 and based in Omaha, Nebraska. They have released one EP on Imagine It Records and two full-length albums for Black Market Activities. They went on indefinite hiatus in May 2010. As of 2021 they have been working on a third album.

== History ==
=== Formation and Misanthropos ===
Paria formed in the fall of 2001 in Omaha, Nebraska. Initially, the band's style was a lot closer to the nu metal genre, but quickly they switched their style to a mixture of mathcore and grindcore styles. The early stages of the band saw members come and go, but by 2003 a solid lineup materialized and the group began honing their sound. During this time, the band recorded a 2-song EP called The Torn Instances on Imagine It Records.

On the strength of their EP, the band signed to Guy Kozowyk's Black Market Activities in March 2004 and began writing and recording their first full-length album. The summer saw the band continue touring around the country, including a stop at the first annual Texas Murder Fest in Houston. Misanthropos was released in November 2004, featuring the band's developed technical and experimental sound.

=== Instrumental era ===
In the summer of 2005, vocalist Brian Craig and drummer Corey Barnes both left the band. Barnes was replaced by Eric Schnee from New Jersey's The Binding but Craig's position was not immediately filled. Various vocalists (including Paul Pettit, and Ben Elliot) filled in on tour, and at one point Elliot was in consideration to join the band. Because Craig had left the band to pursue college, he joined them on tour during the following summer when he was off from school. Additionally, the band began pre-production for their next album with featured Craig on vocals.

In early 2007, drummer Eric Schnee left the group to move back to New Jersey and reform his old band The Binding, while the band confirmed that Craig had "left the band for good" to finish college. Original drummer Corey Barnes rejoined the group at this point and they continued performing and writing as an instrumental act, including becoming one of the few metal bands to play the Omaha Entertainment Awards, where they were nominated for Best Metal/Punk/Hardcore band.

With much of their second album written and recorded instrumentally, the band felt that it was still missing something. In June 2008, they sent the album to former vocalist Brian to see if he could guest on a few tracks. Having just finished his college degree, Brian decided to return to the band and recording continued with him as a full member.

=== The Barnacle Cordious and break-up ===
The band released their second full-length album The Barnacle Cordious in March 2009. The album was noted for the growth of the band's sound between albums which became even separated from traditional musical forms. Upon its release, they began sporadically touring throughout the midwest, including a stop at the American Waste Festival in Kansas City.

On May 24, 2010, the band announced its "last show for an indefinite period of time" on June 5. They stated that they "did not believe Paria will ever be a finished experiment" but cited "other priorities" as the reason for the indefinite hiatus.

== Musical style ==
Paria combines a lot of mathcore and grindcore styles with a mix of progressive metal to it. The basslines are unique overall, with aggressive vocals and pounding guitar and drum playing.

== Discography ==
Albums

- 2004: Misanthropos (Black Market Activities)
- 2009: The Barnacle Cordious (Black Market Activities)

EP

- 2003: The Torn Instances (Imagine It Records)

Singles

• 2023: Venerate

• 2024: Roadblock

• 2024: Abomination

== Members ==
Current lineup

- Brian Craig - Vocals/Guitar (January 2003-July 2005, June 2008-May 2010)
- John Claus - Guitar (2001-May 2010)
- Dustin Treinen - Bass (2001-May 2010)
- Corey Barnes - Drums (2001-August 2005, 2007-May 2010)

Former members

- Eric Schnee - Drums (Nov 2005–Jan 2007)
- Andrew Gustafson - Guitar
- Aaron Langan - Guitar
- Tim Greenup - Bass
- Steven E. Athay - Vocals (July 2002 - December 2002)

Live/tour only members

- Ben Elliot - Vocals (January 2006)
