= Conversations (From a Second Story Window album) =

Studio album by From a Second Story Window
- Released: May 27, 2008
- Recorded: January 2008
- Studio: More Sound Studios
- Genre: Progressive metalcore; post-hardcore
- Length: 43:31
- Label: Metal Blade; Black Market Activities
- Producer: Jason "Jocko" Randall

From a Second Story Window chronology
Delenda (2006)	Conversations (2008)	Let This World Swallow Us (2021)

Professional ratings
Review scores
Source	Rating
AllMusic	4/5 stars
Lambgoat	4/10

Conversations is the second studio album by From a Second Story Window. It was released on May 27, 2008. This album is a concept album, telling the stories of people of the world and the conversations they have with each other.

== Track listing ==
All tracks are written by From a Second Story Window.

No.	Title	Length
1.	"Most of Us Are Normal"	2:55
2.	"Self Admitted"	3:46
3.	"Leaving the Earth"	5:45
4.	"Monumental Treason"	5:16
5.	"The Burning Bush"	2:50
6.	"Severed Heads Open Minds"	4:45
7.	"A Swarm of Bees"	4:34
8.	"Advancement Towards Nothingness"	4:54
9.	"Stolen Lands"	6:14
10.	"When Harry Lost Sally"	4:32
Total length:		43:31

== Personnel ==
- Will Jackson – Vocals
- Rob Hileman – Rhythm guitar
- Paul Misko – Lead guitar
- Joe Sudrovic – Bass
- Nick Huffman – Drums
