= From a Second Story Window =

American metalcore band

- Also known as: FASSW, Aphasia
- Origin: Warren, Ohio, U.S.
- Genres: Progressive metalcore; mathcore; deathcore
- Years active: 1999–2008, 2023–present
- Labels: Black Market; Metal Blade
- Members: Joe Sudrovic; Nick Huffman; Paul Misko; Rob Hileman; Sean Vandegrift
- Past members: Will Jackson; Jeff Peterson; Derek Vasconi

From a Second Story Window (sometimes abbreviated as FASSW) is an American metalcore band that formed in 1999 in Ohio as Aphasia. By 2003, they had changed their name to From a Second Story Window.

== History ==
The band's first EP was self-released as The Cassandra Complex in 2003. It was repackaged and re-released by Black Market Activities as Not One Word Has Been Omitted in 2004. In 2006, the band released Delenda, their first full-length album under Black Market Activities and distributed by Metal Blade.

After releasing Delenda, the band toured throughout North America and Europe until the summer of 2007. Then they finished writing their second full-length album. Conversations was released May 27, 2008, again on Black Market Activities. They toured Europe in 2007, along with Walls of Jericho, Born from Pain, Fear My Thoughts, All Shall Perish, and Freya. On August 29, 2008, in a MySpace blog, the band announced that they had disbanded.

On November 18, 2023, the band reunited (along with original vocalist Sean Vandegrift for 'I Tried Voodoo Once'), and played a reunion show near their hometown at the Westside Bowl in Youngstown, Ohio. Openers included Neighbor Dan, Nights Like These, and See You Next Tuesday.

During the band's reunion concert, From a Second Story Window debuted two new songs: "So Say We All" and "Earthen Eyes". "So Say We All" was released as a single on February 16, 2024. The band then released "Earthen Eyes" on May 16 and announced the two songs would be released together on the 7" single "Recompose" in the summer.

On October 23, 2024, vocalist Will Jackson announced that he departed with From a Second Story Window. Former vocalist Sean Vandegrift has rejoined the group, and the band plan to write more music. On January 1, 2025, the band released the stand-alone single "Lowest", the band's first release with Vandegrift on vocals since Not One Word Has Been Omitted.

== Musical style ==
The band's first two releases primarily featured a mix of progressive metal, mathcore, and deathcore, with AllMusic reviewer Stewart Mason referring to Delenda as "deeply schizoid." Conversations features a more melodic progressive metalcore and post-hardcore sound, dropping most of the mathcore and deathcore influences from previous releases.

== Members ==
=== Current line-up ===
- Sean Vandegrift – vocals (2003–2005, 2024–present)
- Joe Sudrovic – bass guitar (1999–2008, 2023–present)
- Nick Huffman – drums (2003–2008, 2023–present)
- Paul Misko – guitar (2006–2008, 2023–present)
- Rob Hileman – guitar (1999–2008, 2023–present)

=== Previous members ===
- Jeff "Jpetes" Peterson – vocals (1999–2003)
- Derek Vasconi – guitar (1999–2006)
- Will Jackson – vocals (2005–2008, 2023–2024)

== Discography ==
Studio albums

Year	Album	Label
2006	Delenda	Black Market Activities/Metal Blade
2008	Conversations	Black Market Activities/Metal Blade

Extended plays

Year	Album	Label
2002	From a Second Story Window	Independent
2003	The Cassandra Complex	Independent
2004	Not One Word Has Been Omitted	Black Market Activities/Metal Blade

Compilations

Year	Album	Label
2021	Let This World Swallow Us	Wax Vessel

Singles

Year	Song title
2024	"So Say We All"
2024	"Earthen Eyes"
2025	"Lowest"

Music videos

Year	Song	Album
2007	"These Lights Above Us"	Delenda
