= Misanthropos =

Studio album by Paria
- Released: November 2, 2004
- Genre: Experimental metal, grindcore
- Label: Black Market Activities/Imagine It

Paria chronology
The Torn Instances (2003)	Misanthropos (2004)	The Barnacle Cordious (2009)

Misanthropos is the first full-length album by the American experimental metal band Paria. It was co-released by Black Market Activities and Imagine It Records on November 2, 2004.

== Track listing ==
No.	Title	Length
1.	"Misanthropos"	4:32
2.	"The Absurdity Of Solace"	4:42
3.	"A Modernist Approach To..."	1:33
4.	"...Human Error"	7:05
5.	"Seeds Planted In Concrete"	3:08
6.	"A Torn Instance"	4:45
7.	"9 Years"	4:44
8.	"Dancing To The Sounds Of Screams"	3:34
9.	"93rd And Paddock And Road"	19:27

== Reception ==
Professional ratings
Review scores
Source	Rating
Allmusic	3/5 stars
Metal Review	(7.3/10)
