= Fea Jur =

Studio album by Lye By Mistake
- Released: October 13, 2009
- Genre: Progressive metal, jazz fusion, instrumental rock, jazzcore
- Length: 49:56
- Label: Black Market Activities
- Producer: Lye By Mistake, Brian Scheffer

Lye By Mistake chronology
Arrangements for Fulminating Vective (2006)	Fea Jur (2009)

Professional ratings
Review scores
Source	Rating
About.com	4/5 stars
Popmatters	8/10 stars
Metalunderground.com	4/5 stars
Allmusic	4/5 stars

Fea Jur is the second album by St. Louis band Lye By Mistake, and was released on October 13, 2009. The album was produced by both the band, as well as Brian Sheffer. It was released on the Boston-based record label, Black Market Activities. The artwork was created by Lamb Grenade

== Track listing ==
1. "Big Red Button" - 4:04
2. "The Condition" - 6:08
3. "Invincible Bad Ass" - 5:45
4. "Vanguard to Nowhere" - 8:52
5. "Stag" - 5:25
6. "Fea Jur" - 7:12
7. "Missouri Tomater" - 1:26
8. "Money Eating Mary (Karaoke Remix)" - 11:04

== Personnel ==
- Johnnie Truesdale - bass
- Josh Bauman - guitar
- Drew Button - drums/percussion
- Lye By Mistake - Producer
- Lamb Grenade - Artwork
- Brian Scheffer - Producer, Engineer
