= Dance Club Massacre =

American deathcore band

- Origin: Chicago, Illinois, U.S.
- Genres: Deathcore, symphonic black metal, mathcore
- Years active: 2004–2010
- Labels: Black Market Activities, Metal Blade
- Past members: Nick Seger; Jon Caruso; Chris Mrozek; Mitch Hein; Matt Hynek; Kurt Latos; James Poston

Dance Club Massacre was an American deathcore band from Chicago, Illinois. Formed in 2004, the group originated as a recording project between founding members Nick Seger and Kurt Latos. After recording three songs described as "Halloween-core" and distributing them to friends, the project became a complete band when friends began rehearsals together while attending college.

Dance Club Massacre consisted of Nick Seger (vocals), Jon Caruso (drums), Chris Mrozek (bass), Mitch Hein (guitar) and Matt Hynek (keyboards). They are currently signed to Metal Blade Records, and its division, Black Market Activities.

== History ==
Dance Club Massacre originated in Lansing, Illinois in 2004 as the duo of Nick Seger and Kurt Latos before acquiring a full line-up consisting of friends, many of whom were college students. The band recorded their first demo in early 2005 at Blam Recording in Chicago, titled Demo, with producer, Eric Butkus. The demo had seven tracks and 150 hand-pressed copies were issued. These copies were sold at shows and through their Myspace profile. Shortly after the release of the demo, Matt Hynek took Kurt Latos' place as keyboardist.

By April 2006, all copies of the demo were sold out. Dance Club Massacre recorded their debut full-length album, Feast of the Blood Monsters, with the same engineer who recorded their demo. Six of the seven tracks from the demo were re-recorded for the album. Feast of the Blood Monsters was self-released and 1,100 copies were made in real packaging, which were sold at local indie record stores, shows, and on Interpunk. The album has stayed in Interpunk's top 50 items since it was released. They played at 2006's Warped Tour. After Black Market Activities noticed them, they signed to the label and their debut album was re-issued through Black Market and Metal Blade with heightened production and different cover art.

During 2008, the band traveled to Syracuse, New York to record their second album, Circle of Death, with Jason Randall at More Sound Studios.

Since 2009, the band have been rather inactive, occasionally updating their Facebook page with group photos of the members in rehearsals. They have not played a single show since 2009, yet have not denied the possibility of a reunion.

== Musical style, influences and concept ==
Genre-wise, the band have been said to include a vast variety of genres into their music including experimental metal, black metal, death metal, grindcore, math rock, post-hardcore, and thrash metal. However, they are primarily recognized as a deathcore band.

Dance Club Massacre generally have an experimental musical style, which is ultimately influenced by many extreme metal and metalcore musical groups. The band's influences include groups such as, Dimmu Borgir, Cradle of Filth, An Albatross, The Locust, Daughters, Converge, Horse the Band, Fantomas, Pig Destroyer and Between the Buried and Me. They even incorporate influence from indie rock musical styles. Their lyrical themes usually focus on subjects such as partying, girls, alcohol and enjoying life in general rather than the morbid or aggressive themes extreme metal bands traditionally employ.

== Band members ==
Final lineup

- Nick Seger – vocals (2004-2010)
- Mitch Hein – guitars (2004-2010)
- Matt Hynek – keyboards, synthesizer (2005-2010)
- Chris Mrozek – bass (2004-2010)
- Jon Caruso – drums (2004-2010)

Former Memberøs

- Kurt Latos – keyboards, synthesizer (2004)
- James Poston – bass (2004-2005)
- Jeff Lohrber - drums (2008)

== Discography ==
Studio albums

- Feast of the Blood Monsters (2006)
- Circle of Death (2008)

Demos

- Demo (self-released, 2005)
