= Architect (band) =

American mathcore band

- Origin: Syracuse, New York and Philadelphia, Pennsylvania
- Genres: Hardcore punk, mathcore
- Years active: 2000–present
- Label: Black Market Activities
- Members: Thomas Calandra; James Bailey; Mark Mcgee; Keith Allen

Architect (formerly known as Found Dead Hanging and briefly as Ghost of the Saltwater Machine) is an American mathcore band from Syracuse, New York, and Philadelphia, Pennsylvania. The band featured members of Word as a Virus “2001-2004” and vocalist Keith Allen who was responsible for establishing and booking the yearly festival Hellfest.

== Band members ==
=== Current lineup ===
- Thomas Calandra – bass
- James Bailey – guitar
- Mark Mcgee – drums
- Keith Allen – vocals

=== Former members ===
- Ant Michel – drums
- Joe Mangipano – bass
- Shaun Purcell – drums
- Timothy Seib – guitar

== Discography ==
Albums

- 2007: All Is Not Lost
- 2008: Ghost of the Salt Water Machines

As Found Dead Hanging

- 2003: Dulling Occams Razor
