= Fused Together in Revolving Doors =

Studio album by The Red Chord
- Released: March 19, 2002
- Recorded: November 29 – December 3, 2001
- Genres: Metalcore, deathgrind, technical death metal
- Length: 29:43
- Labels: Robotic Empire; Metal Blade
- Producers: The Red Chord, Andrew Schneider

The Red Chord chronology
Fused Together in Revolving Doors (2002)	Clients (2005)

Professional ratings
Review scores
Source	Rating
AllMusic	3/5 stars
Lambgoat	9/10 stars
Punknews.org	4/5 stars

Fused Together in Revolving Doors is the debut studio album by The Red Chord. The name of the album is a reference to a night club fire that took place in Boston in the 1940s during which the crowd tried to exit through a set of revolving doors. People were trampled on and when the building burned down, bodies were found fused together in the doors—hence the name.

The album was re-issued in 2004 with the demo versions of the songs "Jar Full of Bunny Parts" and "Better Judgment".

== Track listing ==
No.	Title	Length
1.	"Nihilist"	3:34
2.	"That Certain Special Ugly"	3:06
3.	"Catalepsy"	3:19
4.	"Like a Train Through a Pigeon"	3:19
5.	"He Was Stretching, and Then He Climbed Up There"	1:54
6.	"Breed the Cancer"	2:33
7.	"L Formation"	1:52
8.	"Dreaming in Dog Years"	3:03
9.	"Sixteen Bit Fingerprint"	7:03

2004 Re-Issue Bonus Tracks:
No.	Title	Length
10.	"Jar Full Of Bunny Parts"
11.	"Better Judgement"
Total length:		29:43

== Personnel ==
- Guy Kozowyk – vocals
- Mike "Gunface" McKenzie – guitar, backing vocals
- Kevin Rampelberg – guitar
- Adam Wentworth – bass
- Mike Justian – drums
