= The Red Death =

American extreme metal band

- Origin: Bath, New York, United States
- Genres: Melodic death metal, deathcore, metalcore
- Years active: 2002–2008
- Labels: Metal Blade (2005-2006); Ferret Music (2007-2008)
- Past members: Paul Hamblin; Aaron Conti; Graham Mitchell; Mark Kelley; Jordan Rathbun; Brian Van Gelder; Karl Janovec; Josh Williammee; Nate Golia; Dominic Mastronunzio

The Red Death was an American extreme metal band from Bath, New York.

== History ==
Formed in 2002 after the demise of Another Day Forgotten by singer Paul Hamblin, guitarist Josh Williammee, and drummer Graham Mitchell, guitarist Brian Van Gelder and bassist Karl Janovec completed the original lineup. In 2003, Van Gelder left the band and was replaced with Nate Golia, a guitarist from nearby Rochester, NY, formerly of Warblade. That summer, they embarked on their first short tour with Virginia screamo band Shadows and the Silence (whose bass player Dominic Mastronunzino would replace Janovec the following summer). While on a three-week tour with New Jersey's With Resistance, the band talks with Metal Blade Records and signed with them the following fall. Golia left the band to concentrate on school and was replaced with Aaron Conti, formerly of If Hope Dies. After signing to Metal Blade, the band embarked on several extended, full-U.S. tours with bands such as From a Second Story Window, The Acacia Strain, Undying, Through the Eyes of the Dead, Arsis, and Into the Moat. Their first album, External Frames of Reference, was released in 2005 by Metal Blade. In 2006, Metal Blade Records dropped them.

With new bassist Jordan Rathbun, the band recorded a new demo for prospective labels. They signed to UK record label Siege of Amida. In a distribution deal with Ferret Records, Siege of Amida released The Red Death's second and final full-length CD, Godmakers, in early 2008. That summer, the band broke up. Their "final" show was Halloween night (2008) at The Little Pickle in Bath, NY. The Red Death reunited for a single show on Halloween night 2009 at the Half Penny Pub in Syracuse, NY.

== Members ==
=== Final line-up ===
- Paul Hamblin - vocals (2002-2008)
- Aaron Conti - guitar (2002-2008)
- Graham Mitchell - drums (2002-2008)
- Mark Kelley - guitar (2007-2008)
- Jordan Rathbun - bass (2007-2008)

=== Former members ===
- Joshua Williammee - guitar, bass
- Bryan VanGelder - guitar
- Nate Golia - guitar
- Dominic Mastronunzino - bass
- Jed Shugars - bass
- Jackson Portwood - bass (2005)
- Karl Janovec - bass

== Discography ==
Studio albums

- External Frames of Reference (2005)
- Godmakers (2008)

EPs

- Aftertaste of the Emaciated (2004)

== See also ==
- List of death metal bands
