= Ed Gein (band) =

American grindcore band (2001–2018)

- Origin: Syracuse, New York, U.S.
- Genres: Grindcore; metalcore; noise rock
- Years active: 2001–2018
- Label: Black Market Activities
- Past members: Graham Reynolds; Aaron Jenkins; Jesse Daino
- Website: edgein.bandcamp.com

Ed Gein was an American grindcore band, based in Syracuse, New York. The band consisted of Graham Reynolds (guitar, vocals), Aaron Jenkins (bass, vocals) and Jesse Daino (drums, vocals). The band took its name from the American murderer Ed Gein. The band is best known for its second album, Judas Goats and Dieseleaters (2005). The follow-up record, titled Bad Luck, was released in 2011.

Ed Gein's music has been labeled as grindcore, metalcore, mathcore and noise rock, featuring influences from thrash metal. On their third album, Bad Luck, the band shifted from their previous technical grindcore in favor of a more hardcore punk-influenced sound. The band's lyrics, primarily written by bassist Aaron Jenkins, are politically charged and features social commentary, on topics including racism in the United States, sexism, homophobia and bureaucracy.

On April 11, 2018, it was announced the band had split up and the members would be forming a new band called Shadow Snakes.

In 2025, Graham Hartmann of Metal Injection included the album Judas Goats and Dieseleaters in his list of "10 Extremely Underrated Metal Albums From The 2000s".

== Band members ==
- Graham Reynolds – guitar, vocals
- Aaron Jenkins – bass, vocals
- Jesse Daino – drums, vocals

== Discography ==
Studio albums

- It's a Shame That a Family Can Be Torn Apart by Something as Simple as a Pack of Wild Dogs (2002)
- Judas Goats and Dieseleaters (2005)
- Bad Luck (2011)

EPs

- Ed Gein (2002)
- Smoked (2016)

Compilations

- It's a Shame (2005)
