= The Barnacle Cordious =

Studio album by Paria
- Released: March 17, 2009
- Genre: Experimental metal, grindcore
- Label: Black Market Activities

Paria chronology
Misanthropos (2004)	The Barnacle Cordious (2009)

The Barnacle Cordious is the second full-length album by the American experimental metal band Paria. It was released by Black Market Activities on March 17, 2009.

== Track listing ==
The Barnacle Cordious
No.	Title	Length
1.	"The Barnacle Cordious"	5:49
2.	"Circus"	6:30
3.	"The Wallabee Dance Machine"	4:13
4.	"Pish Posh"	8:25
5.	"Bomb"	6:05
6.	"Rabid McFly Grid"	1:38
7.	"Thrash"	4:37
8.	"Be"	4:42
9.	"I've Never Been Here Before in a Long Time"	12:40

== Reception ==
Professional ratings
Review scores
Source	Rating
Allmusic	3.5/5 stars
Metal Review	7/10 stars
