= The Abominable Iron Sloth =

American sludge metal band

- Also known as: The Indomitable Iron Sloth
- Origin: Sacramento, California, U.S.
- Genres: Sludge metal
- Years active: 2003–present
- Labels: Goodfellow; Black Market Activities
- Members: Justin Godfrey; Cayle Hunter; Jeff Irwin; Mike Martin; Mitch Wheeler

The Abominable Iron Sloth is an American sludge metal band from Sacramento, California. The band features vocalist/guitarist Justin Godfrey, guitarists Cayle Hunter and Jeff Irwin, bassist Mike Martin, and drummer Mitch Wheeler. They released their eponymous debut album through Goodfellow Records in early 2006. Their second album, The Id Will Overcome, was released in 2010.

The band's sound, which combines "the heaviness of Black Sabbath with the concussive force of hardcore punk," has been compared to those of sludge metal acts such as Eyehategod, Acid Bath, Iron Monkey and Melvins.

== Band members ==
- Justin Godfrey – vocals, guitar
- Cayle Hunter – guitar
- Jeff Irwin – guitar
- Mike Martin – bass
- Mitch Wheeler – drums

== Discography ==
Studio albums

- The Abominable Iron Sloth (2006)
- The Id Will Overcome (2010)
