= Mahavatar (band) =

- Origin: New York City, United States
- Genres: Progressive metal Thrash metal Industrial metal
- Years active: 1999−present
- Labels: Escapi Music
- Members: Lizza Hayson; Shahar Mintz; Szymon Maria Rapacz; Glenn Grossman; Richard Almady
- Past members: Peter Lobodzinski; Benjamin Serf; Eddie Gasior; Itamar Ben-Zakay; Roi Star; Eran Asias; Karla Williams

Mahavatar is an American progressive metal band from New York City. Former drummer, Eran Asias was in the band and contributed drums along with other groups from his country Israel including: Orphaned Land, Betrayer and Eternal Gray. To add to that, former guitarist Karla Williams is from Jamaica while former drummer Peter Lobodzinski is Polish.

== Discography ==
=== Albums ===
- Go with the NO! (2005)
- From the Sun, the Rain, the Wind, the Soil (2006)

=== Demos and promos ===
- Promo 2000 Single (2000)
- Demo 2000 Demo (2000)
- Demo 2003 Demo (2003)

== Members ==
=== Current ===
- Lizza Hason Demauro − Vocals,
- Richard Almady − Guitar, backing vocals
- Spectra Artceps − Bass
- Aidan Shepard − Drums
- Keisuke Furokubo - Guitar

=== Former ===
- Peter Lobodzinski − Drums (1999–2001)
- Benjamin Serf − Bass (1999–2000)
- Eddie Gasior − Bass (2000–2003)
- Itamar Ben-Zakay − Drums (2003)
- Roi Star − Drums (2005–2006)
- Eran Asias − Drums
- Karla Williams − Guitars

=== Session ===
- Miko − Keyboards
- T-Bone Motta − Drums
- DMD Death Metal Dave - Guitar
