= Deadwater Drowning =

American deathcore band

- Origin: Brookline, New Hampshire, U.S.
- Genres: Deathcore
- Years active: 2002–2004
- Label: Black Market Activities
- Past members: Nate Johnson; Seth Coleman; Steve Whalen; Jon Dow; Johnny Fay; Moe Watson

Deadwater Drowning was an American deathcore band formed in 2002 in Brookline, New Hampshire. It is notable for the myriad of groups affected when the band broke up in 2004 and its members splintered into various other groups such as The Acacia Strain, The Red Chord, and Through the Eyes of the Dead. Guy Kozowyk of The Red Chord cited the band as his inspiration to start his record label Black Market Activities, whose second release was the band's sole output.

== History ==
Deadwater Drowning was formed in 2002 following the demise of the group Chagrin, whose members wanted to take a faster and heavier approach. They began writing and playing shows in New England, gathering a small following. The band's only full tour was with The Red Chord, Premonitions of War, and The Black Dahlia Murder. Eventually, they caught the ear of Guy Kozowyk of fellow New Englanders The Red Chord who was thinking of starting his own label. He enjoyed the band and made their debut release one of the first for Black Market Activities.

Following the release of their self-titled EP, the band continued playing shows in their local area including a performance at the 5th annual New England Metal and Hardcore Festival in Worcester, Massachusetts. They recorded one other song entitled "Slap Her Ass and Ride The Wave In" which only saw digital release. Shortly following that they broke up, however, some of the members continued on with The Final Battle who occasionally perform Deadwater Drowning material. It was only in the months following their demise that their self-titled EP began to gather more attention.

=== Legacy ===
While the band was short-lived, its members went on to form notable hardcore punk and extreme metal bands. Vocalist Nate Johnson also joined a variety of bands including Buckhunter, Since the Flood, Burnt by the Sun, Premonitions of War, The Network, Fit For An Autopsy, and Through the Eyes of the Dead. Bassist Seth Coleman went on to join The Acacia Strain as well as Buckhunter and Fit For An Autopsy with Nate. Both Nate and Seth joined guitarist Steve Whalen in forming The Final Battle together.

Drummer Jon Dow and guitarist Jonny Fay both performed in The Red Chord. Fay also opened his own recording studio Backyard Studios where he has recorded artists such as The Red Chord and fellow Metal Blade label-mates Whitechapel, among others. Drummer Moe Watson went on to perform with Shai Hulud, Marc Rizzo, War On Our Shores, Mercury Switch, and Running With Karma, as well as later joining The Final Battle.

== Musical style ==
Deadwater Drowning are often cited as one of the earliest deathcore bands. Their music, which features an early 2000s east coast metalcore sound combined with death metal sensibilities, contains blast beats, breakdowns, death metal vocals and occasional melodic riffs set in frenetic song structures akin to mathcore. Their musical style has been said to form the "blueprint" of deathcore bands that followed, many of whom share some connection to the band via former members.

== Discography ==
Extended plays

- 2003: Deadwater Drowning (Black Market Activities)

Demos

- 2002: Deadwater Drowning (self-released)

== Members ==
- Seth Coleman – bass (2002–2004)
- Nate Johnson – vocals (2002–2004)
- Moe Watson – drums (2003-2003)
- Steve Whalen – guitar (2003–2004)

=== Former members ===
- Jon Dow – drums (2002–2003)
- Johnny Fay – guitar (2002–2003)
