= Not One Word Has Been Omitted =

The Cassandra Complex/Not One Word Has Been Omitted

EP by From a Second Story Window
- Released: 2003; October 19, 2004 (re-release)
- Recorded: North Olmstead, Ohio
- Genres: Progressive metal; mathcore; deathcore
- Length: 31:30
- Label: Black Market Activities
- Producers: Cole Martinez; From a Second Story Window

From a Second Story Window chronology
From a Second Story Window (2002)	The Cassandra Complex/Not One Word Has Been Omitted (2003)	Delenda (2006)

Not One Word Has Been Omitted is the first EP by the progressive metal/mathcore band From a Second Story Window, released under its current title in 2004 by Black Market Activities. It was originally self-released in 2003 under the title The Cassandra Complex. This is the band's only release to feature second vocalist Sean Vandegrift.

The tracks "In a River Where You Least Expect It There Will Be Fish" and "How London Got Its Fog" feature lyrics written by original vocalist Jeff Peterson; these two songs originally appeared on the band's self-titled demo from 2002.

== Track listing ==
All tracks are written by From a Second Story Window, except where noted.

No.	Title	Writer(s)	Length
1.	"The Challenge of Caring"		4:45
2.	"I Tried Voodoo Once"		6:01
3.	"In a River Where You Least Expect It There Will Be Fish"	Jeff Peterson, From a Second Story Window	6:25
4.	"How London Got Its Fog"	Peterson, From a Second Story Window	5:25
5.	"Vespers"		8:53
Total length:			31:30

== Personnel ==
From a Second Story Window

- Sean Vandegrift – vocals
- Joe Sudrovic – bass
- Nick Huffman – drums
- Derek Vasconi – guitar
- Rob Hileman – guitar

Additional personnel

- Cole Martinez – Mixing
- Adam Wentworth – Artwork and design
