= Calico System =

American metalcore band

- Origin: St. Louis, Missouri, U.S.
- Genre: Metalcore
- Years active: 1998–2007
- Labels: SGM; Eulogy
- Past members: Mark Owens; Justin Haltmar; Rick Giordano; Josh Travis; Erik Ramsier; Nick Schaflein; Shawn Keith; Brad Sexton; Geoff Cardin; Ryan Woolsey; Andy Brandemeyer; Ramon Woody
- Website: calicosystem.net

Calico System was an American metalcore band from St. Louis, Missouri. The group formed in 1998 and released several albums under the Eulogy Recordings label after successful LP releases and abundant touring. They announced their disbandment in 2007, stating each member decided to pursue their own career.

== History ==
=== 1998 ===
Calico System was formed by group of friends in the fall of 1998. With the help of the apartment junkies they came up with their name. The quartet take a variety of different elements from metal and hardcore and fuse them with emo, groove, punk and various other genres.

After solidifying their line-up, they have gone on to independently release two EPs and complete several independent tours. They have also gained supporting spots for such bands as Hatebreed, Poison the Well, Open Hand, Hopesfall, Finger Eleven, Candiria, Sworn Enemy, Codeseven, dredg, Chiodos, Love Hate Hero, Mutter, and many others.

The continuous touring seemed to pay off, gaining them a spot on Eulogy Records where they would release their first LP, 'The Duplicated Memory". The album consisted of all of the songs on their local label EP, Love Will Kill All plus two brand new songs and one song that was re-recorded from their very first EP, Question The Answer.

=== 2005 ===
Calico System's album, They Live was released in November 2005. A video for the single "They Live" aired on MTV's Headbangers Ball. A video for the track "Running with Scissors" was also released.

=== 2007 ===
The band recorded their last album, Outside are the Vultures, in January 2007. It was announced during recording that Erik Ramsier would leave the band to pursue a life with his family. Shortly thereafter, Shawn Keith announced he was leaving the band to work at a record label in West Hollywood, CA. Drummer Brad Sexton and guitarist Josh Travis, both from the St. Louis band When Knives Go Skyward were brought in as replacements.

Later in 2007 Calico System had to be changed to The Calico System because of a company of the same name.

On Wednesday, July 18, 2007, Calico System posted a blog to announce the breakup of the band.

=== 2009 ===
On December 26, 2009 the band played a one-off reunion show at Fubar in St. Louis.

Rick and Erik currently play in The Lion's Daughter along with former Rusted Skin bassist, Jon Milles.

Justin Haltmar currently plays/tours with the punk/hardcore outfit The Disappeared.

== Band members ==
=== Last-known lineup ===
- Mark Owens - vocals
- Justin Haltmar - bass
- Rick Giordano - guitar
- Joshua Travis - guitar (Emmure, ex-The Tony Danza Tapdance Extravaganza, ex-Glass Cloud, ex-When Knives Go Skyward, ex-The Goddamn Rodeo, ex-Monuments) (2007)
- Erik Ramsier - drums

=== Former members ===
- Nick Schaflein - bass
- Shawn Keith - guitar
- Brad Sexton- drums
- Geoff Cardin - guitar
- Ryan Woolsey - drums
- Andy Brandemeyer - guitar
- Ramon Woody - vocals

== Discography ==
- Question the Answer (EP) (SGM Records, 2001)
- Love Will Kill All (EP) (SGM Records, 2003)
- The Duplicated Memory (Eulogy Recordings, 2003)
- They Live (Eulogy Recordings, 2005)
- Outside Are the Vultures (Eulogy Recordings, June 5, 2007)

== Videography ==
- They Live
- Running with Scissors
