= Pish Posh =

2006 novel by Ellen Potter

- Author: Ellen Potter
- Language: English
- Publication date: 2006

Pish Posh is the name of a children's novel by American author Ellen Potter, first published in 2006. It tells the story of a young girl, Clara Frankofile, who is a pompous, snobbish 11-year-old who spends her evenings people-watching from a corner table in her parents' chic New York City restaurant, Pish Posh.

== Summary ==
Clara Frankofile is a wealthy, snobbish eleven-year-old who lives alone in a New York City penthouse fitted with its own roller coaster and bumper cars. Feared throughout the city, she spends each evening at the fashionable Pish Posh restaurant, where she watches the actresses, princesses, and celebrities and decides which of them is important enough to keep their table and which will be turned away.

But Clara's tidy little world is suddenly turned upside down when she discovers that a mystery is happening in the restaurant, right under her nose. With the help of a 12-year-old jewel thief, Clara embarks on a mission through the streets of New York to solve a 200-year-old secret.
