= Beyond the Sixth Seal =

American metal band

- Origin: Massachusetts, U.S.
- Genres: Melodic death metal; Death 'n' roll
- Years active: 1998–2003; 2006–present
- Labels: Metal Blade Records; Lifeforce Records; Black Market Activities
- Members: Mike McKenzie; Greg Weeks; Brendan Roche
- Website: Official Myspace page

Beyond the Sixth Seal is a side-project of Mike McKenzie and Greg Weeks of The Red Chord. They were formed as a thrash metal band in the suburbs of Boston in 1998 and released a few demos. In the summer of 2000, bassist Adam Wentworth (The Red Chord) joined BTSS to record their debut EP, A Homicide Divine, in early 2001.

After a European tour and a series of shows in the United States, writing for the full length began. Earth And Sphere was written during a major line-up change. Wentworth moved to guitar and Rob Devlin (guitar) and Lawrence Kwong (vocals) exited the band. Beyond the Sixth Seal continued writing the album while searching for replacements. The first to join was bassist Matt Woods (American Nightmare), followed shortly after by singer Mike McKenzie (also of The Red Chord). The album was released in 2002 on German label Lifeforce Records. Beyond the Sixth Seal disbanded the following year in 2003.

In 2006, the band reformed as a studio project and signed to Metal Blade Records. A rough demo of a new song appeared on their Myspace page.

== Members ==
- Brendan Roche – drums (1998–2003, 2006–present)
- Mike "Gunface" McKenzie – vocals, guitar (2001–2003, 2006–present)
- Greg Weeks – bass (2003, 2006–present)

== Former members ==
- Ross McCue – guitar
- Justin Chapel – guitar (1998–2003)
- Rob Devlin – guitar (1998–2001)
- Lawrence Kwong – vocals (1998–2001)
- Adam Wentworth – bass (2000–2001) guitar (2001–2003)
- Matt Woods – bass (2001–2003)

== Discography ==
Albums

- 2002: Earth and Sphere (Lifeforce Records)
- 2007: The Resurrection of Everything Tough (Metal Blade Records)

EPs

- 2001: A Homicide Divine (Voice of Life Records)

Demos

- 1999: Genocide Empire
- 2000: The White Demo
- 2002: Knives & Guns
