= Bird Eater =

American metalcore band

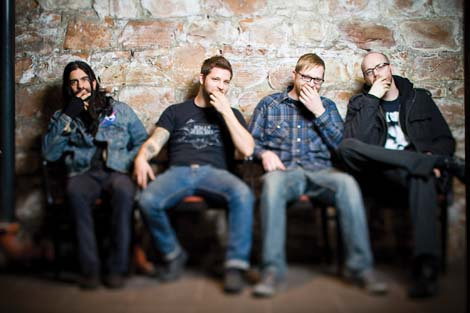
- Bird Eater

Background information
- Origin: Utah
- Genres: Metalcore; Country; Sludge metal
- Years active: 2005–2014
- Labels: Exigent, Black Market Activities
- Members: Jon Parkin; Chris Clement; Anthony Lucero; Oz Inglorious; Kel Prime
- Website: Bird Eater

Bird Eater is an American metalcore band from Utah formed in 2005. The group consists of vocalist Jon Parkin, guitarists Chris Clement and Anthony Lucero, bassist Oz Inglorious, and drummer Kel Prime. Since its inception Bird Eater has been considered by fans, peers and critics as western death metal for their extensive use of dark country vibes and western themed artwork.

In 2007 the band recorded their debut EP Utah, which was released on Exigent Records, which was their only release to feature Jon Parkin on bass and vocals. In 2009, the band recruited Oz Inglorious to take over bass duties.

The band recorded the album Dead Mothers Make the Sun Set (DMMTSS) with engineer Andy Patterson working, released on Black Market Activities February 2014 after nearly 3 years of delays between the recording and the release. DMMTSS was released as a limited edition vinyl pressing as well as digital.

== Members ==
- Jon Parkin (Vocals)
- Chris Clement (Guitars, vocals)
- Anthony Lucero (Guitars, vocals, artwork)
- Oz Inglorious (Bass)
- Kel Prime (Drums)

== Discography ==
- Utah EP (2007)
- Dead Mothers Make the Sun Set full-length (2014)
