= Born from Pain =

Dutch hardcore band

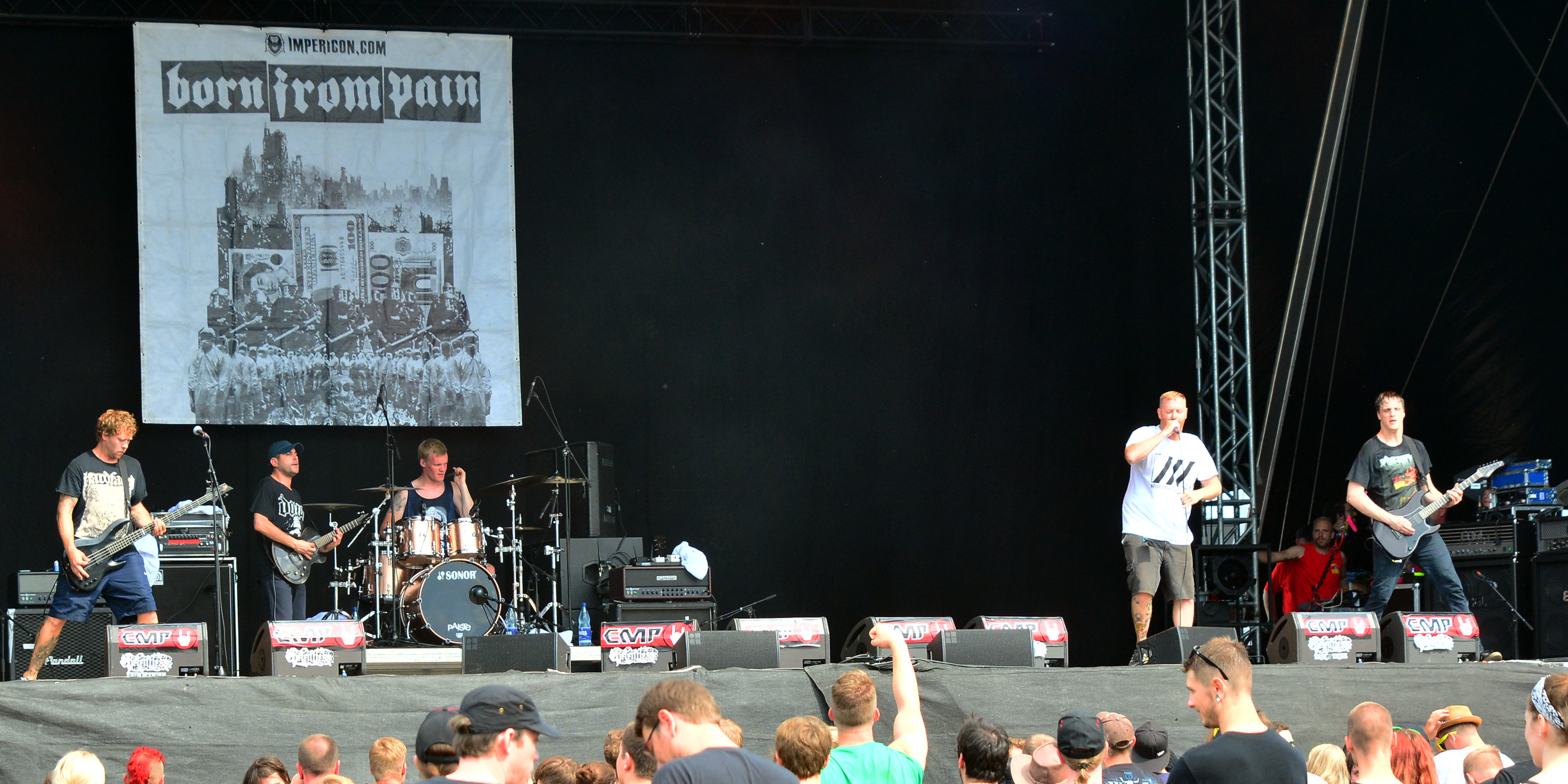
- Born from Pain at Reload Festival 2015

Background information
- Origin: Heerlen, Limburg, Netherlands
- Genres: Metalcore; hardcore punk; tough guy hardcore
- Years active: 1997–present
- Labels: Metal Blade, Black Market Activities
- Members: Rob Franssen; Dominik Stammen; Stefan van Neerven; Tommy Gawellek; Max van Winkelhof
- Past members: Pieter Hendriks; Ché Snelting; Servé Olieslagers; Wouter Alers; Kevin Otto; Roel Klomp; Karl Fieldhouse; Pete Goerlitz
- Website: bornfrompain.com

Born from Pain is a Dutch hardcore band from the Oostelijke Mijnstreek (as a part of the infamous M.O.C.) that formed in 1997.

Since they formed, they have achieved fame through energetic shows and grew out to become the international band they are today. They have toured Europe, the United States, Mexico and Japan. They have shared stages with bands such as Hatebreed, Madball, Zero Mentality, Six Feet Under, Soulfly, Agnostic Front and Slayer.

In March 2007, longtime frontman Che left the band for personal reasons. He was temporarily replaced by Carl Schwartz, frontman of First Blood, and Scott Vogel from Terror. The band later found a full-time vocalist in Kevin Otto of German deathcore band End of Days. But Otto struggled with his voice so he was replaced by bassist Rob Fransen and Andries Beckers of The Setup took over on bass. Born from Pain are widely regarded as one of the premier European hardcore bands.

== Members ==
Current members

- Rob Franssen – vocals
- Dominik Stammen – guitar
- Stefan van Neerven – guitar
- Tommie Gawellek – bass guitar
- Max van Winkelhof – drums

Former members

- Ché Snelting – vocals 1997–2007
- Servé Olieslagers – guitar
- Marijn Moritz – guitar
- Wouter Alers – drums
- Pieter Hendriks – drums
- Kevin Otto – vocals
- Andries Beckers – bass guitar
- Roy Moonen – drums
- Karl Fieldhouse – guitar
- Igor Wouters – drums
- Roel Klomp – drums
- Pete Gorlitz – bass
- Andries Beckers - bass 2008-2011

== Discography ==
=== Studio albums ===
- 2002: Reclaiming the Crown (Gang Style Records)
- 2003: Sands of Time (Gang Style Records)
- 2005: In Love With the End (Hollowman Records)
- 2006: War (Metal Blade Records)
- 2008: Survival (Metal Blade Records)
- 2012: The New Future (Gang Style Records)
- 2014: Dance With The Devil (BDHW Records)
- 2019: True Love (BDHW Records)

=== EP ===
- 1999: Immortality (Gang Style Records)
