= The Tony Danza Tapdance Extravaganza =

American mathcore band

- Performing live in July 2007

Background information
- Origin: Murfreesboro, Tennessee, U.S.
- Genres: Mathcore, deathcore, djent, mathgrind (early)
- Years active: 2004–2012; 2025–present
- Labels: Black Market Activities, Corrosive
- Members: Jessie Freeland; Layne Meylain; Eric Berngruber; Mike Butler; Mason Crooks; Josh Travis
- Past members: Brad Thomson; Mike Bradley; Phil Lockett; Djed Cyril; Kade Dodson; Jimmy Rhodes; James Boswell; Chris Clark; Gareth Fritz; Brandon Bateman; Paul Simpson; James Rogen; Kim Byung Hoon

The Tony Danza Tapdance Extravaganza is an American mathcore band from Murfreesboro, Tennessee. The band was founded in Monroe, Louisiana, by members Layne Meylain, Mason Crooks, Brad Thomson, and Mike Butler. They relocated to Murfreesboro to look for a frontman and found Jessie Freeland. They released four studio albums before disbanding in 2012. Danza reunited in February 2025 for a series of live performances later that year and a new studio album.

== History ==
The Tony Danza Tapdance Extravaganza was founded in 2004. They chose their band name after actor Tony Danza; the humorous moniker is occasionally misinterpreted, as older concertgoers have attended shows in hopes of seeing Danza in person. The group signed with Corrosive Recordings in 2005 after self-releasing their debut album. In the summer of 2006, the band's practice space burned down and the members lost over $15000 (equivalent to $23,956 in 2025) in equipment loss and damages. Their second release, Danza II: The Electric Boogaloo, was issued in 2007 on Black Market Activities. The album's name is a parody of the Danzig album, Danzig II: Lucifuge, as well as the 1980s film Breakin' 2: Electric Boogaloo. The album features short, humorous skits interspersed with the songs making fun of their surroundings growing up. The group has toured with Cattle Decapitation, Arsonists Get All the Girls, Veil of Maya, Full Blown Chaos, Despised Icon, The Acacia Strain, Beneath the Massacre, Unearth, See You Next Tuesday, The Red Chord, Shai Hulud, Psyopus, The Number 12 Looks Like You, Lye By Mistake, A Life Once Lost, and Emmure, among others. In March 2008, the band crashed their tour van after playing a show in Lewisville, Texas. Former member Brad Thomson founded Midgets with Machetes, a record label distributed by Uprising Records.

On September 24, 2009, the band announced that Layne Meylain and Mike Butler had amicably left the group. At the same time, the band formally announced their next album, Danza III: A Series of Unfortunate Events. The album focuses on lyrical themes such as personal, social, political and global "unfortunate events" tied around the three musical themes of technical, groove-based and ambient music. It was recorded in November 2009 with Jeremiah Scott and Steve Blackmon.

The band released their third album, Danza III: The Series of Unfortunate Events, on July 6, 2010. On the record, Josh Travis performs lead and rhythm guitar on an 8-string guitar as well as the bass. It also marks the first album by the band to include drummer Mike Bradley. The songs "I Am Sammy Jankis" and "The Union" were released as singles.

During May 2011, the band confirmed that Danza IIII is in the works. In the meantime, guitarist Josh Travis joined Jerry Roush's new band Glass Cloud as a side-project with their debut album, The Royal Thousand, being released on July 3, 2012.

On October 16, 2012, their album Danza IIII: The Alpha – The Omega was released. Dave Mustein of MetalSucks gave the album 4.5 out of 5 stars, stating, "Danza's bottom end is the single most unified element on The Alpha The Omega. There's no denying that previous Danza releases are heavy[...] but the record's heaviness is primarily due to the fact that all the instrumentation on the album was performed by rhythmic mastermind Joshua Travis[...] The production holds it all together, sounding gritty but professional, digital but uncompressed," but criticized the band for falling "into the trap of writing filler; the numerous samples begin to run together, decreasing the impact of songs like Hold the Line. And it's almost impossible to sit through the entirety of the glitchy, gimmicky Some Things Are Better Left Unsaid."

On August 23, 2012, Joshua Travis made this statement regarding Danza's future:

"For this album, Jessie and I were looking to create more of a visceral vibe than a completely technical vibe. There's parts that do still get a bit chaotic of course, but not nearly as much as the avid listener is used to. Everything about this record is way more to the point, with much more heart put into it rather than just seeing how many notes could be thrown into a part or seeking to create 'the heaviest shit ever' or any of that nonsense. The record being titled The Alpha – The Omega, to us symbolized the beginning and the end of Danza. Jessie and I hope you enjoy it as much as we enjoyed creating it for you all."

The band's breakup led the members to pursue different careers. Guitarist Travis went on to join the metalcore band Glass Cloud and, later, Emmure.

Guitarist Brad Thomson died in August 2023.

In February 2025, The Tony Danza Tapdance Extravaganza announced that it was reforming for a performance at Furnace Fest 2025, taking place on October 3-5, 2025. During their show, they stated that a fifth album was in the works. By the end of 2025, the group solidified their lineup. The band now contains six members, with three guitarists—the first time Tony Danza has ever maintained three guitar players at once. Many original members returned to the group for this iteration of the band, including drummer Crooks, bassist Butler and guitarist Meylain, all of whom hadn't been seen since Danza II (2007). The single "Say When", their first official release since 2012, was released on March 6, 2026.

== Band name ==
The group derived their name as a joke from celebrity Tony Danza, one of his professions being tap dancing.

Danza himself became aware of the band when a fan sent in a letter informing him about the group and the band consequently had their music played, which was the song "5 Deep on Charlie", on an episode of the talk show program The Tony Danza Show.

== Band members ==
Current

- Jessie "Danza" Freeland – vocals (2004–2012, 2025–present)
- Mason Crooks – drums (2004–2007, 2025–present)
- Mike Butler – bass (2004–2009, 2025–present)
- Layne Meylain – guitar (2004–2009, 2025–present)
- Josh Travis – guitar (2009–2012, 2025–present)
- Eric Berngruber – guitar (2025–present)

Former

- Brad Thomson – guitar (2004–2008) (died 2023)
- Jimmy Rhodes – guitar (2008)
- James Boswell – guitar (2008)
- James Rogen – bass (2009)
- Gareth Fritz – guitar (2009–2010), bass (2009–2010)
- Chris Clark – guitar (2010–2011)
- Paul Simpson – guitar (2007–2009), bass (2011–2012)
- Brandon Bateman – drums (2007-2009)
- Mike Bradley – drums (2009–2011)
- Phil Lockett – bass (2010–2011)
- Kim Byung Hoon – bass 2011)
- Kade Dodson – drums (2011–2012) (died 2018)

Timeline

== Discography ==
=== Studio albums ===
Year	Album	Label
2005	The Tony Danza Tapdance Extravaganza	Corrosive Recordings
2007	Danza II: The Electric Boogaloo	Black Market Activities
2010	Danza III: The Series of Unfortunate Events	Black Market Activities
2012	Danza IIII: The Alpha – The Omega	Black Market Activities

=== Demos ===
Year	Album	Label
2004	Thank You, Jason Dietz	Independent

=== Music videos ===
Year	Song	Album
2007	"Carrol 14 Wossman 7"	Danza II: Electric Boogalo
2026	"Say When"	Upcoming fifth studio album
