= Through the Eyes of the Dead =

American deathcore band

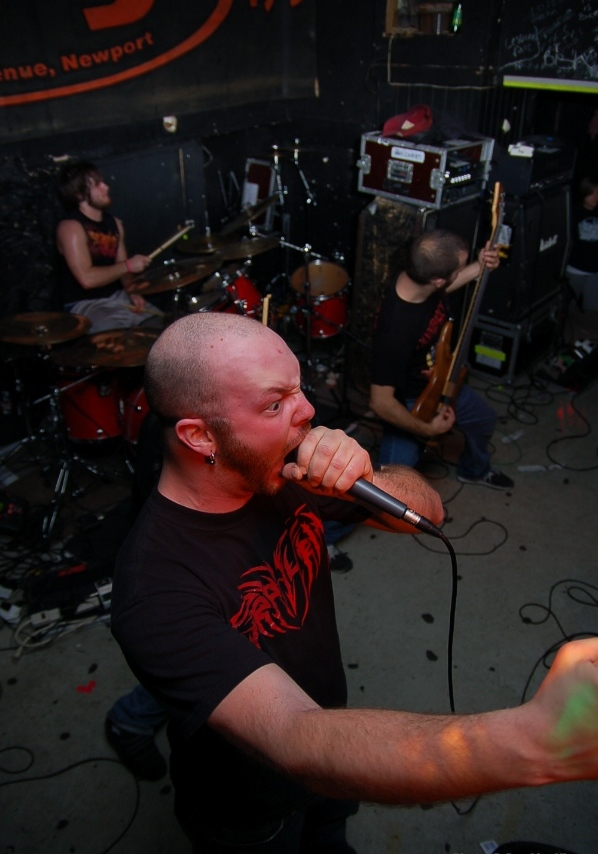
- Performing in 2007

Background information
- Also known as: TTEOTD
- Origin: Florence, South Carolina, United States
- Genres: Deathcore, melodic death metal, technical death metal
- Years active: 2003–present
- Labels: eOne Music, Good Fight Music, Prosthetic
- Members: Justin Longshore; Jake Ososkie; Steven Funderburk; Danny Rodriguez; Michael Ranne
- Past members: Anthony Gunnells; Nate Johnson; Richard Turbvelle; Chris Anderson; Jeff Springs; Dayton Cantley; Josh Kulick; Chris Henckel; Tony Groves

Through the Eyes of the Dead is an American death metal band from Florence, South Carolina, formed in 2003. They have released four studio albums, one EP and one split album with The Knife Trade.

== History ==
The band was formed by Justin Longshore in 2003 after the break-up of Tellherisaidgoodbye. Their first full-length album was released in 2005 through Prosthetic Records. Shortly before, every member except for Longshore and Gunnells left. The latter was let go a few months later for personal reasons. They added new members, but they would also leave the band before the third studio album was released, leaving Jake Ososkie (bass) and Justin Longshore (guitar) remaining. After some time off, they regrouped and released their third album, Skepsis. The band believed that album's lineup was their strongest, and that Skepsis represented the band's trajectory. The band's influences include Morbid Angel, Blood Has Been Shed, Suffocation, Cannibal Corpse, Meshuggah, Behemoth, and At the Gates.

The band has released three studio albums with Prosthetic Records: Bloodlust in 2005, Malice in 2007, and Skepsis in 2010.

Shortly before the US release of Malice, the band shot a music video with director David Brodsky at an abandoned mental facility in Kings Park, Long Island, NY. The video was one of the most played videos on MTV2's Headbanger's Ball in 2007, and chosen as the #7 Video of the Year 2007. It was in the Top 10 Music Choice VOD for nearly six months as of April 2008.

TTEOTD toured to support the Skepsis with many acts including Suffocation, The Faceless, Decrepit Birth, Fleshgod Apocalypse, Otep, Bury Your Dead, Chelsea Grin, The Tony Danza Tapdance Extravaganza, Impending Doom, Whitechapel, Born of Osiris, Periphery, and Greeley Estates. The band performed on half of 2010's 'thrash n burn' tour. On April 30, 2012, the band began a new album. The band posted some samples of their EP on Instagram. In March 2017, the band announced that they would record a new full-length album, to be released through Good Fight Entertainment. A pre-production version of the song "Phantoms" (later retitled "Of Mortals, We Once Were" on the album Disomus), was posted on the band's SoundCloud page and YouTube.

In August 2017, the band announced the ten-track album Disomus, released on October 13, 2017, through eOne Music/Good Fight Music to generally positive reviews.

== Members ==
=== Current ===
- Justin Longshore – guitar (2003–present)
- Jake Ososkie – bass (2005–present)
- Danny Rodriguez – vocals (2008–present)
- Michael Ranne – drums (2009–present; touring 2008)
- Steven Funderburk – guitar (2016–present; touring 2014)

=== Former ===
- Jeff Springs – bass (2003–2005)
- Dayton Cantley – drums (2003–2005)
- Anthony Gunnells – vocals (2003–2007)
- Richard Turbeville – guitar (2003–2004, 2007–2008)
- Chris Anderson – guitar (2004–2007)
- Josh Kulick – drums (2005–2008)
- Nate Johnson – vocals (2007)
- Chris Henckel – guitar (2008–2016)

=== Touring ===
- Jerry Stovall – drums (2005)
- Lou Tanuis – vocals (2007)
- Hector De Santiago – drums (2007)
- Tony Groves – drums (2009-10)

== Discography ==
Studio albums

- Bloodlust (2005)
- Malice (2007)
- Skepsis (2010)
- Disomus (2017)

EPs

- The Scars of Ages (2004)

Split albums

- Annihilation of Expectation (2005; split with The Knife Trade)

== Music videos ==
- "Two Inches from a Main Artery" (2006)
- "Failure in the Flesh" (2007)
- "Hate the Living" (2017)
