= Lye by Mistake =

American mathcore band

- Origin: St. Louis, Missouri, U.S.
- Genres: Mathcore, progressive metal, jazz fusion
- Years active: 2004–2011
- Label: Black Market Activities
- Members: Ben Whailin; Drew Button; Bob-e Rite; Johnnie Truesdale
- Past members: Tony Saputo

Lye by Mistake was an American experimental metal band from St. Louis, Missouri, that formed in 2004. They released their most recent album, Fea Jur, on October 13, 2009. They blend many genres into their music, including progressive rock, jazz fusion, and mathcore. After seven years as a musical project, the members went their separate ways in 2011. By late 2012, the band's dissolution was confirmed by both former vocalist Tony Saputo and former drummer Drew Button, although no official breakup announcement was ever made.

== History ==
After they formed, they self-produced and released a five-track EP, "The Fabulous", in 2004.

In May 2006, they released their debut album "Arrangements For Fulminating Vective" on Lambgoat Records. The album was mixed by Eric Rachel and mastered by Alan Douches.

In June 2008, vocalist Tony Saputo left the band. The band intended to find another vocalist but decided to continue for their second album as an instrumental band. In October 2009, "Fea Jur" was released as their sophomore effort on the record label Black Market Activities.

The band's name comes from Edward Gorey's book of the illustrated alphabet, in which J is for James who took lye by mistake.

== Members ==
- Josh Bauman – guitar
- Drew Button – drums/percussion
- Bob-e Rite – guitar
- Johnnie Truesdale – bass

=== Former members ===
- Tony Saputo – vocals
- Michael Krueger – drums
- Michael Nelson – bass

== Discography ==
=== Albums ===
- Arrangements for Fulminating Vective (Lambgoat Records, 2006)
- Fea Jur (Black Market Activities, 2009)

=== EPs ===
- The Fabulous (Independent, 2004)
