= Destroy Destroy Destroy =

American metal band

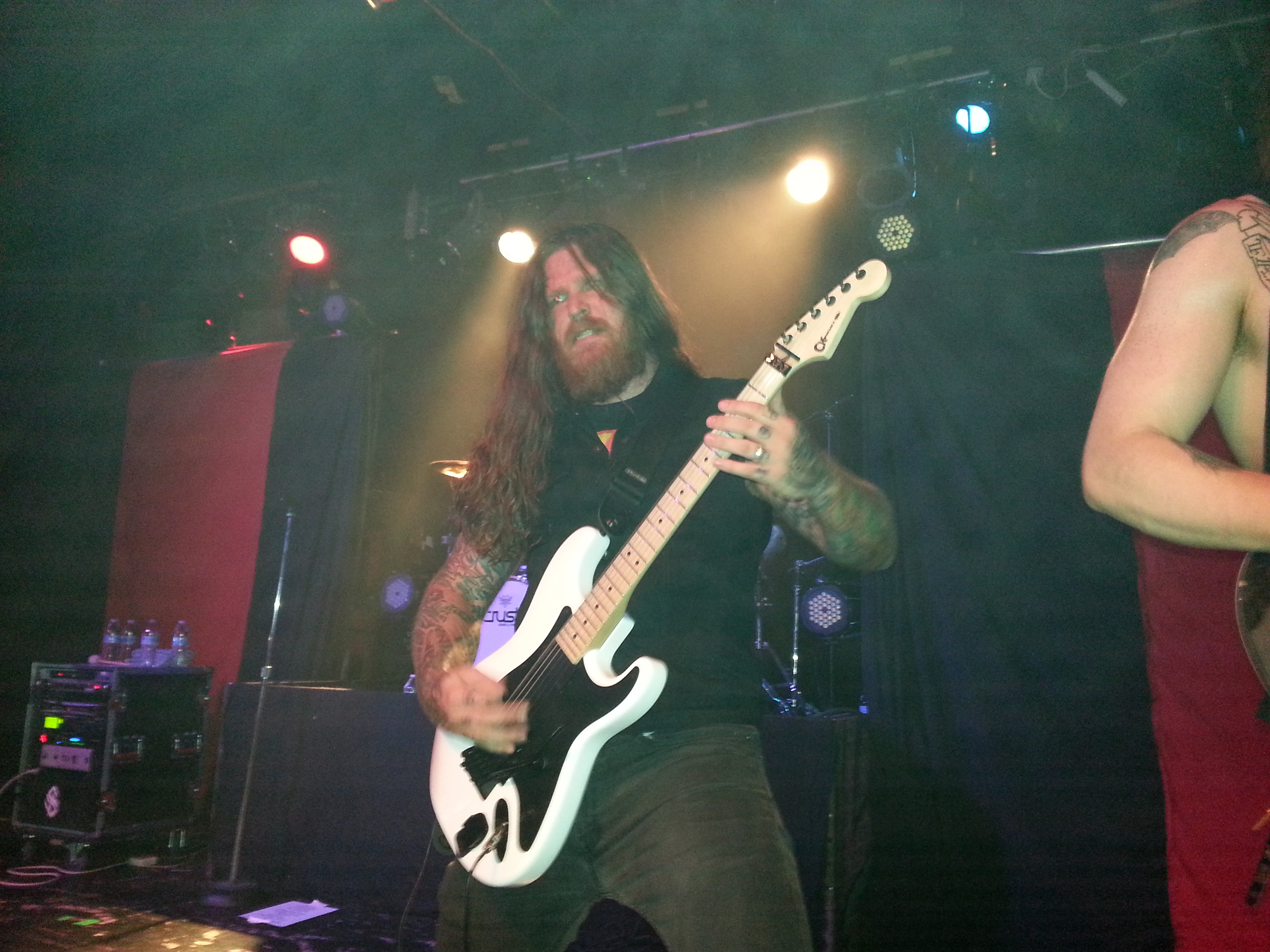
- Jeremiah Scott in 2014

Background information
- Origin: Murfreesboro, Tennessee, U.S.
- Genres: Melodic death metal; power metal
- Years active: 2003–2010, 2024 (on hiatus)
- Label: Black Market Activities
- Members: Jeremiah Scott; Way Barrier; Adam Phillips; Brian Shorter; Andrew Core; Chris Bazor
- Past members: Alex Gillette; Eric W. Brown; David Shaw; Andrew Hall; Jessica Lambert; Keith Williams; Courtney Edwards; Bryan Kemp

Destroy Destroy Destroy is an American melodic death metal band formed in Murfreesboro, Tennessee in February 2003. With a lineup of rhythm guitarist Jeremiah Scott, vocalist Bryan Kemp, and drummer Andrew Hall, they began writing songs. Soon after, Destroy Destroy Destroy completed their outfit with lead guitarist Way Barrier, bassist Adam Phillips, and keyboardist Brian Shorter. The group started playing shows locally and recorded the self-financed EP Kill or Be Killed. They have released two studio albums, Devour the Power (2006) and Battle Sluts (2009), through Black Market Activities. Destroy Destroy Destroy played their first opening for Mastodon.

== Musical style and influences ==
Destroy Destroy Destroy's style was described by critics as melodic death metal, power metal, symphonic black metal, thrash metal, and viking metal. Chad Bowar of About.com defined Destroy Destroy Destroy as a "versatile band, which incorporates many genres into their sound" and said that "their songs are sometimes orchestral and majestic with lots of keyboards, and other times harsh and intense with blast beats and breakdowns." Bowar noted Destroy Destroy Destroy's musical traits, stating, "The Viking influence comes with spoken word interludes and lyrics talking about battles, mythical beasts and lost worlds. Destroy Destroy Destroy also has a lot of Bay Area thrash influences along with European melodic death stylings. Power metal is another genre their music encompasses with frenetic guitar shredding, epic arrangements and atmospheric keyboards."

AllMusic writer Alex Henderson stated that Devour the Power "would have been identified as a power metal-oriented disc with progressive metal influences, some thrash parts and some black metal-style blast beats." Defining Destroy Destroy Destroy as symphonic black metal, Henderson observed, "Battle Sluts, like other symphonic black metal discs, was not recorded with black metal purists in mind; Destroy Destroy Destroy aren't pretending to be Gorgoroth or Marduk, and melody is a high priority throughout this Viking-themed outing."

Although the band is native of Tennessee, their music "employ[s] the techniques and styles of metal made popular in Europe", specifically the Scandinavian countries like Norway, Sweden, and/or Finland—with a "Nordic-sound", blending "melody and aggression". Destroy Destroy Destroy has been compared to Iron Maiden, Queensrÿche, Manowar, Judas Priest, and Dream Theater, and has cited Metallica and Pantera as influences.

The band stated that their sound contains "elements from the early thrash metal and glam metal bands of the 1980s and 1990s, to the current sounds of Scandinavian melodic death metal and viking metal bands of today."

== Members ==
Current

- Jeremiah Scott – rhythm guitar (2003–present)
- Way Barrier – lead guitar (2003–present)
- Adam Phillips – bass (2003–present)
- Brian Shorter – keyboards (2007–present)
- Andrew Core – drums (2009–present)
- Chris Bazor – vocals (2009–present)

Former

- Eric W. Brown – drums (2004–2008)
- Andrew Hall – drums (2003–2004)
- David Shaw – drums (2008–2009)
- Jessica Lambert – keyboards (2006)
- Alex Gellette – keyboards (2003–2006)
- Keith Williams – keyboards (2006)
- Courtney Edwards – keyboards (2006–2008)
- Bryan Kemp – vocals (2003–2009)

Timeline

== Discography ==
Studio albums

- Devour the Power (2006)
- Battle Sluts (2009)

EPs

- Kill or Be Killed (2003)
