= The Red Chord =

American deathcore band

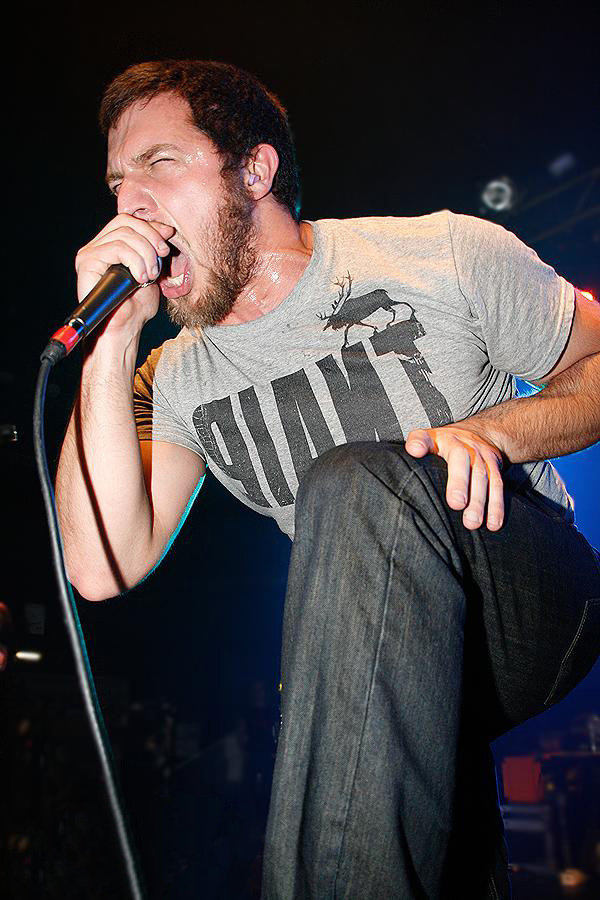
- Vocalist Guy Kozowyk performing in 2009

Background information
- Origin: Revere, Massachusetts, U.S.
- Genres: Deathcore; grindcore; technical death metal
- Years active: 1999–present (hiatus from 2015–2022)
- Labels: Metal Blade; Robotic Empire
- Members: Guy Kozowyk; Mike McKenzie; Greg Weeks; Jon Rice
- Past members: Mike Justian; Kevin Rampelberg; Jonny Fay; Mike Keller; Adam Wentworth; Brad Fickeisen; Jon Dow; John Longstreth; Tim Brault
- Website: theredchord.com

The Red Chord is an American extreme metal band from Revere, Massachusetts, formed in 1999. The group comprises vocalist Guy Kozowyk, guitarist/vocalist Mike "Gunface" McKenzie, bassist Greg Weeks and drummer Jon Rice. The band gained a fanbase with its 2002 debut album Fused Together in Revolving Doors. The second album, Clients, was released in 2005 and sold over 50,000 copies in the U.S. They released their third album, Prey for Eyes in 2007, which sold between 4,000 and 5,000 copies and debuted at No. 198 on the Billboard 200 chart. Their latest album, 2009's Fed Through the Teeth Machine, debuted at No. 180 on the Billboard 200 chart.

The Red Chord has released four studio albums and toured North America, Europe, and Japan.

== History ==
=== Formation, Fused Together in Revolving Doors and Clients (1999–2006) ===
Singer Guy Kozowyk and guitarist Kevin Rampelberg formed The Red Chord in Revere, Massachusetts, in 1999. Second guitarist Mike "Gunface" McKenzie, bassist Adam Wentworth, and drummer Mike Justian joined a year later. The band's name derives from Alban Berg's opera Wozzeck, about a schizophrenic man who kills his lover and asks, "My love, what is that red cord across your neck?" The debut album, Fused Together in Revolving Doors, was recorded with producer Andrew Schneider in December 2001 and released by the Robotic Empire record label. It gained The Red Chord a substantial fanbase.

In early 2004, Wentworth and Justian left The Red Chord and bassist Gregory Weeks and drummer Jon Dow replaced them. In April that year, The Red Chord toured with Six Feet Under and others. The debut album was re-released with demo tracks, a full concert performance, and the video clip for "Dreaming In Dog Years". In March, the band signed to Metal Blade. John Longstreth replaced Dow in May but exited in September. The Red Chord entered Planet Z Studios in Hadley, Massachusetts on November 1, with new drummer Brad Fickeisen and recorded their second album, Clients, which sold over 50,000 copies in the US.

2005 started with American tours and resumed with European tours in December. The band filmed a promotional video for the track "Antman" with director Dave Brodsky. The tour continued in North America through February 2006 until Ozzfest in June.

=== Prey for Eyes and Fed Through the Teeth Machine (2007–present) ===
In February 2007, guitarist Jonny Fay quit the band and was replaced with Mike Keller. In May 2007, the band went on another tour to Europe. The third album, Prey for Eyes, was released on July 24. The group parted ways with Keller in early September and did not replace him.

The band's fourth album, Fed Through the Teeth Machine, was recorded in early to mid-2009 in Milford, New Hampshire, at Backyard Studios, owned by the band's former guitarist, Jonny Fay. The album was released on October 27, 2009. Kozowyk said that the new songs were more intense and mature than the previous album. "It's faster and heavier, but it's definitely groove-oriented and melodic where it needs to be," he commented. Fed Through the Teeth Machine sold around 2,700 copies in the United States in its first week of release and debuted at No. 180 on the Billboard 200 chart.

In 2010, the release was followed by a headlining tour in the U.S. Due to a volcano eruption on Iceland, The Red Chord missed a co-headlining European "Machines Of Grind" tour with Aborted and Rotten Sound, who subsequently embarked on a "DIY Fuck The Volcano" tour without The Red Chord. The band performed in Japan with Between the Buried and Me. Drummer Michael Justian rejoined the band in February 2010, shortly after Fickeisen departed. Fickeisen commented his departure: "There is no easy way to go about leaving a busy band with plans in constant motion, but a little abruptly, I chose to depart from manning the kit for The Red Chord. I have had a great time for the past five years with these guys, and wouldn't exchange it for anything. Touring is tough; everyone who's done it knows that. (...) I want to thank Greg, Guy, and Mike, and wish them the best of luck in the future." A music video for "Demoralizer" was filmed in late 2009 and released in mid-February.

Justian departed The Red Chord in March 2011. On April 15, 2013, Guy Kozowyk became a sworn officer of the Manchester, New Hampshire Police Department, with six other new officers during a ceremony at police headquarters.

On February 2, 2022, the band announced they would perform at the Decibel Metal & Beer Fest in June, ending a hiatus from performing the band had started in 2015. They performed their 2005 album Clients in full.

== Musical style ==
The majority of The Red Chord's music is composed by McKenzie and to a lesser degree by Weeks and other band members. The lyrics are written by Kozowyk. The band's grindcore based sound also incorporates elements of death metal, metalcore, hardcore punk, and progressive death metal, and is considered experimental. The Red Chord typically uses frequent tempo changes, technically proficient instrumental approach and emphasizes the element of groove in their music.

Because the band has combined several different elements of heavy music into their style, they have been considered among the very first deathcore bands due to their hybridization of death metal with metalcore/hardcore influences; however this statement is debatable because The Red Chord have always featured more eccentric influences in their music than just simply metalcore and death metal.

Kozowyk uses death growls and screams with occasional spoken word and is rather decipherable. Kozowyk points out Frank Mullen from Suffocation as a vocal influence, Black Sabbath as a musical influence, and Faith No More as a lyrical inspiration.

== Members ==
Current

- Guy Kozowyk – vocals (1999–present)
- Michael "Gunface" McKenzie – guitar, backing vocals (2000–present)
- Gregory Weeks – bass (2004–present)
- Jon Rice – drums (2011, 2014–present)

Former

- Kevin Rampelberg – guitar (1999–2005)
- Mike Justian – drums (2000–2004, 2010–2011)
- Adam Wentworth – bass (2000–2004)
- Jon Dow – drums (2004)
- John Longstreth – drums (2004)
- Jonny Fay – guitar (2005–2007)
- Brad Fickeisen – drums (2004–2010)
- Mike Keller – guitar (2007–2008)
- Tim Brault – drums (2014)

Timeline

== Discography ==
Studio albums

- Fused Together in Revolving Doors (2002)
- Clients (2005)
- Prey for Eyes (2007)
- Fed Through the Teeth Machine (2009)

== Music videos ==
- "Dreaming in Dog Years" (2002)
- "Antman" (2005)
- "Blue Line Cretin" (2005)
- "Black Santa" (2006)
- "Fixation on Plastics" (2006)
- "Dread Prevailed" (2007)
- "Demoralizer" (2009)

== See also ==
- Beyond the Sixth Seal
