= Black Market Activities =

American independent record label

- Founded: 2003
- Founder: Guy Kozowyk
- Distributors: Metal Blade, RED Distribution
- Genre: Extreme metal, hardcore punk, avant-garde metal
- Country of origin: United States
- Location: Revere, Massachusetts

Black Market Activities (BMA) is an American independent record label that was founded in 2003 by Guy Kozowyk, the frontman of the Boston, Massachusetts-based extreme metal band the Red Chord.

== History ==
Black Market Activities was started with the stated goal of releasing records by bands that are pushing the boundaries of extreme music while keeping a friendly artist-centered attitude that steers clear of a lot of the "major label" business-like dealings that tend to hurt and exploit bands. The founder of the label being an extreme musician himself, he can more easily relate to the issues that are important to the bands on the label, and attempts to balance the business and art aspects of the music world. BMA is a tight-knit group of bands and friends who share similar ideas and musical tastes.

In the years since its creation, BMA has grown quickly and gained much recognition. Black Market Activities teamed up with long-running metal record label Metal Blade Records on a production and distribution deal which allows all BMA releases to reach the same major stores as Metal Blade releases. This has propelled BMA and all its bands forward quite a bit. It has also, however, lead to some confusion as to which bands are on BMA and which bands are on Metal Blade, as both record labels' logos now appear on the backs of all BMA recordings.

== Artists ==
=== Current artists ===
- The Abominable Iron Sloth
- Architect
- Behold... The Arctopus
- Bird Eater
- Destroy Destroy Destroy
- Engineer
- Fit for an Autopsy
- Khann
- Lords
- the_Network
- Romans
- Stomach Earth
- Sweet Cobra
- Today Is the Day

=== Past artists ===
- Animosity (disbanded in 2009)
- Backstabbers Incorporated (inactive since 2008)
- Beyond the Sixth Seal (now on Metal Blade)
- Born From Pain (now on Metal Blade)
- Dance Club Massacre (inactive since 2010)
- Cancer Bats (now on Distort Entertainment)
- Ed Gein (disbanded in 2018)
- Deadwater Drowning (disbanded in 2004)
- Found Dead Hanging (changed name to Architect)
- From A Second Story Window (disbanded in 2008)
- Gaza (disbanded in 2013)
- Lye by Mistake (disbanded in 2011)
- Hivesmasher (on hiatus)
- Lamb Of God (now on Epic and Roadrunner)
- Paria (disbanded in 2010)
- Premonitions of War (now on Victory)
- Psyopus (disbanded in 2012)
- The Red Chord (now on Metal Blade)
- Sleep Terror (inactive)
- The Tony Danza Tapdance Extravaganza

== See also ==
- List of record labels
- Metal Blade Records
