= Hellfest (American music festival) =

American music festival

- Hellfest 2004 banner
- Genre: Hardcore; metalcore; post-hardcore; punk rock
- Dates: Various
- Locations: New York, New Jersey
- Years active: 1997–2005, 2025-present
- Founders: Keith Allen, Ryan Canavan

Hellfest is an American all-ages music festival that existed between 1997 and 2005, and 2025 onwards. The festival showcases hardcore music in its broadest sense, including punk rock, metalcore, emo, post-hardcore and more. It originated in Central New York, in and around Syracuse, but eventually relocated to Central New Jersey. Hellfest is known for its fan-friendly atmosphere, including a lack of barriers that provided easy access to the stage for stage diving and sing-alongs. It also encouraged social-awareness through workshops that discussed such causes as animal rights, LGBTQ and politics, with many of its bands and attendees following straight-edge and/or vegetarian or vegan lifestyles.

Not unlike many festivals of its size, Hellfest encountered several problems, notably the changing venues mere days before starting. This was the case for 1999's Syracuse Hell Fest 99, 2000's Hellfest 2K, 2001's Hellfest 2001 and 2005's Hellfest '05. The relocation caused an entire day to be missed of the 2000 edition, while the 2005 edition was cancelled altogether. The considerable financial dilemma that resulted from the 2005 event's cancellation led to the termination of the festival.

In 2022, Trustkill Records owner Josh Grabelle resumed operations after the rights to the label were restored to him. In 2025, Hellfest returned, under the name Hellphyra in collaboration with New Jersey label Takedown Records, and Connecticut label Ephyra Recordings and took place from July 5-6, 2025 with a July 4 date under the name “Hellfest Presents: New Jersey Hardcore”.

Hellfest took place, under its original name on July 3-5, 2026 in Carteret, NJ, at the Carteret Performing Arts and Events Center. The next planned edition of the fest is on February 20-21, 2027 in Pomona, California, called Hellfest West.

== History and etymology ==
Co-promoter Josh Grabelle, who was also a sponsor of the festival through his record label Trustkill Records, claimed in 2001 that the event was named Hellfest because "This festival has always been the first weekend in July and it is always extremely HOT, hence, the reference to the blazing inferno known as Hell". This explanation, though inaccurate, has since become de facto, even though Grabelle was not involved with the early years of the festival.

The factual reason behind the naming of the festival was linked to founding promoter Keith Allen's concert booking agency, Hardcore As Hell. Allen and his partner Ryan Canavan had been booking and promoting concerts in the Syracuse, New York area since 1996. Canavan also had his own booking agency, Hanging Like A Hex, which gave name to a fanzine that he published and, later, the record label Hex Records. Canavan's fanzine Hanging Like a Hex published the first festival's guide/pamphlet as issue number 7.5. Allen and Canavan co-booked the first three festivals: the first event in 1997 was promoted as Syracuse 3-Day Super Festival; the two events in 1998 were promoted as Syracuse Hardcore Festival and Syracuse Hardcore Festival 2.5. It was only with the fourth event in 1999, once Allen became sole promoter, that the word hell was added to the name and the event was promoted as Syracuse Hell Fest 99. The single-word Hellfest was first used for the 2000 edition as Hellfest 2K. Allen was also keen on booking his own bands (Order of Deceit, The August Prophecy, Found Dead Hanging and Architect) in favorable time slots.

For Hellfest 2004, Allen relocated the festival from New York to New Jersey, forming a new partnership corporation. Paper Street Music Co. LLC was co-founded by Allen and Shawn Van Der Poel and was based in Mount Holly, New Jersey. They copromoted 2004 Hellfest with Heath Miller and Excess dB Entertainment at Rexplex in Elizabeth, NJ.

== Hellfest lineups by year ==
=== June 20–22, 1997: Syracuse 3-Day Super Festival ===
Location: Hungry Charley's, 727 South Crouse Avenue, Syracuse, New York.

==== Friday, June 20 ====
- 454 Big Block
- Cast Iron Hike
- Dirge
- Dissolve
- Snapcase
- Sweetbelly Freakdown
- Ten Yard Fight

==== Saturday, June 21 ====
- Beta Minus Mechanic
- Bird of Ill Omen
- Burial Ground
- Coalesce
- Culture
- Handful of Dust
- Indecision
- Lockjaw
- Morning Again
- Order of Deceit
- Silent Majority
- Today Is the Day

==== Sunday, June 22 ====
- Another Victim
- Ascension
- Birthright
- Culture *
- Day of Suffering
- Despair
- Drowning Room
- Endeavor
- Frodus
- Groundzero
- Hatebreed
- One to Face
- Tread

==== Notes ====
* Culture performed their regular set on June 21, then played a 1-song set on June 22 using Hatebreed's gear.

The Earth Crisis side-project Brown Stars was scheduled to make a special, unlisted appearance on Sunday, June 22, but backed out the day before, leading local band Tread to be added to the line-up.

=== June 13–14, 1998: Syracuse Hardcore Festival ===
Location: Cornell Cooperative Extension, 248 Grant Avenue, Auburn, New York.

==== Saturday, June 13 ====
- Anal Cunt
- Boysetsfire
- Break of Dawn
- Buried Alive
- Dissolve
- Dragbody
- Holdstrong
- Overcast
- Quioxte
- Shutdown
- Still Bleeding
- The Trans Megetti
- Turmoil

==== Sunday, June 14 ====
- 6 Going on 7
- Brother's Keeper
- Cave In
- Coalesce
- Creation Is Crucifixion
- Defect
- The Dillinger Escape Plan
- Disembodied
- Errortype: Eleven
- Human Shield
- Kerosene 454
- Morning Again
- NORA
- Racetraitor
- Set in Motion
- SeventyEightDays
- Snapcase
- Thoughts of Ionesco
- Torn Apart

=== December 5–6, 1998: Syracuse Hardcore Festival 2.5 ===
Location: The Lost Horizon, 5863 Thompson Road, Syracuse, New York.

==== Saturday, December 5 ====
- Acacia
- Ascension
- All Else Failed
- Cave In
- Creation Is Crucifixion
- Crossthread
- Dead Eyes Under
- The Grey A.M.
- Groundzero
- Motive
- The Passenger Train Proposal
- Piebald
- Shadows Fall
- Skycamefalling

==== Sunday, December 6 ====
- Alabama Thunder Pussy
- Burn it Down
- Burn the Priest
- Disembodied
- Drowningman
- For the Love of...
- God Forbid
- Good Clean Fun
- Indecision
- Isis
- Jesuit
- NORA
- Racetraitor

==== Notes ====
This was the only time that the festival held an event during the autumn.

=== June 26–27, 1999: Syracuse Hell Fest 99 ===
Location: The Lost Horizon, 5863 Thompson Road, Syracuse, New York.

==== Saturday, June 26 ====
- As Friends Rust
- Boysetsfire
- Buried Alive
- Creation Is Crucifixion
- Eternal Youth
- Fastbreak
- NORA
- Reach the Sky
- Since the Fall
- Snapcase
- Standfast
- Ten Yard Fight
- Where Fear and Weapons Meet

==== Sunday, June 27 ====
- Another Victim
- Break of Dawn
- Brother's Keeper
- Disembodied
- Drowningman
- Fallout
- Glasseater
- Good Clean Fun
- Grade *
- Grey Area
- The Judas Factor
- Spread the Disease

==== Notes ====
* Grade were scheduled to play but did not due to an incident with a taser.

The following bands may have also played: Eighteen Visions, Fall Silent, Kid Dynamite, Kill the Slave Master, One King Down and Racetraitor.

Originally scheduled to take place at Another Level, 727 South Crouse Avenue, but it was moved to The Lost Horizon.

=== June 30–July 2, 2000: Hellfest 2K ===
Locations: The Lost Horizon, 5863 Thompson Road, Syracuse, New York / Club Mirage, 6815 Manlius Center Road, East Syracuse, New York.

==== Friday, June 30 * ====
- As Friends Rust
- Burn It Down
- Candiria
- Codeseven
- Creation Is Crucifixion
- The Dillinger Escape Plan
- Disciple
- Dissolve
- Drowningman
- Ensign
- Godbelow
- Gunmen and Flightpaths
- Isis
- The Juliana Theory
- Kill Your Idols
- Maharahj
- The National Acrobat
- NORA
- Zao

==== Saturday, July 1 ====
- Adamantium
- Bane
- The August Prophecy
- Beyond Fall
- Bloodjinn
- Buried Alive
- Cave In
- Converge
- Death by Stereo
- Dragbody
- Eighteen Visions
- Glasseater
- Good Clean Fun
- Head On
- Idle Hands
- Killswitch Engage
- Mid Carson July
- Prayer for Cleansing
- Reach the Sky
- Red Roses for a Blue Lady
- Time in Malta
- Walls of Jericho

==== Sunday, July 2 ====
- All Else Failed
- Anodyne
- Brother's Keeper
- Crucible
- Destro
- Diecast
- Every Time I Die
- The Grey A.M.
- The Hope Conspiracy
- New Day Rising
- One King Down
- Poison the Well
- Shai Hulud
- Spark Lights the Friction
- Spitfire
- Starkweather
- This Day Forward
- Throwdown
- Turmoil
- Twelve Tribes

==== Notes ====
* The festival was initially scheduled to take place at the Booker T. Washington Community Center in Auburn, New York. On Thursday, June 29, the city of Auburn objected to the festival taking place so the organizers secured a second venue near Syracuse Hancock International Airport in Syracuse, New York. On the morning of Friday, June 30, the fire department objected to the festival because it was too close to the airport. The event was moved again to The Lost Horizon but this time the city of Syracuse objected to the festival taking place. The bands and record labels set up a hardcore flea market in the parking lot of The Lost Horizon to sell merchandise, meanwhile Maharahj and Creation Is Crucifixion performed in a local girl named Emily's front yard down the street. The organizers spent the day finding a new venue and re-booking most of the bands from Friday, June 30 into the next two days. The Saturday, July 1 and Sunday, July 2 shows took place at Club Mirage in East Syracuse.

=== July 6–8, 2001: Hellfest 2001 ===
Location: Action Sports & Skate Center, 2299 Brewerton Road, in Mattydale, New York

==== Friday, July 6 ====
===== Main Stage =====
- Eighteen Visions
- Ensign
- Every Time I Die
- Glasseater
- Godbelow
- Good Clean Fun
- Just Passed
- Locked in a Vacancy
- Long Since Forgotten
- Martyr A.D.
- Poison the Well
- Santa Sangre
- Spark Lights the Friction
- This Day Forward
- Throwdown
- Trouble Loves Me
- Walls of Jericho

===== Second Stage =====
- A Death for Every Sin
- All Else Failed
- Anodyne
- Arma Angelus
- Arms Length
- The Bluestardiary
- Building on Fire
- Cataract
- Ebony Sorrow
- Embrace Today
- Fairweather
- From Autumn to Ashes
- In Pieces
- Jeromes Dream
- Kalibas
- Keelhaul
- One Nation Under
- Miles Between Us

==== Saturday, July 7 ====
===== Main Stage =====
- American Hot Wax
- Another Victim
- Brother's Keeper
- Burn It Down
- Burnt by the Sun
- Course of Action
- Groundzero
- Lamb of God
- Lariat
- Length of Time
- Most Precious Blood
- NORA
- One King Down
- Open Hand
- Reach the Sky
- Remembering Never
- Shai Hulud
- Stretch Arm Strong
- Thursday
- Until the End

===== Second Stage =====
- Cipher
- Curl Up and Die
- Destro
- The Disaster
- The Grey A.M.
- Holy Angels
- Inkling
- Mastodon
- Mid Carson July
- Pig Destroyer
- Premonitions of War
- Ruined in a Day
- Saving Throw
- Season of Fire
- Standfast

==== Sunday, July 8 ====
===== Main Stage =====
- Arkangel
- Cable
- Candiria
- Catastrophic
- Diecast
- Earth Crisis
- Hatebreed
- If Hope Dies
- In Dying Days
- Killswitch Engage
- Skycamefalling
- Spitfire
- Twelve Tribes
- Undying
- Unearth
- Zao

===== Second Stage =====
- A Jealousy Issue
- The August Prophecy
- Beyond Fall
- Bleeding Through
- Blood Has Been Shed
- Bloodjinn
- Circle of Dead Children
- Craig
- Darker Day Tomorrow
- Dead Limb Sleep
- FaceDown
- Garrison
- Harakiri
- Maharahj
- Stalemate
- Sworn Enemy
- Upheaval
- When Dreams Die
- Wrong the Oppressor

==== Notes ====
The festival was originally booked and announced to take place at Action Sports & Skate Center, 2299 Brewerton Road, in Mattydale, New York. However, on June 19, 2001, less than three weeks before the event, the promoters moved the show to Liquids in East Syracuse. In a sleight-of-hand trick, attendees arriving at Liquids on the morning of July 6 were greeted with flyers stating "It wouldn't be Hellfest without drama," with directions back to the Mattydale Action Sports & Skate Center, the true location of the festival.

The 2001 edition was the first to feature two stages.

=== July 12–14, 2002: Hellfest 2002 ===
Location: New York State Fairgrounds, 581 State Fair Boulevard, Syracuse, New York.

==== Friday, July 12 ====
===== Main Stage =====
- Atreyu
- Bane
- Bloodlet
- Diecast
- The Dillinger Escape Plan
- Every Time I Die
- God Forbid
- Hopesfall
- Nemesis
- NORA
- Norma Jean
- On the Might of Princes

===== B Stage =====
- A Life Once Lost
- Between the Buried and Me
- Building on Fire
- Endicott
- In Pieces
- The June Spirit
- Killswitch Engage
- Love Is Red
- Open Hand
- Season of Fire
- Taken
- Your Enemies Friends

===== C Stage =====
- 7 Angels 7 Plagues
- American Tragedy
- As Hope Dies
- Breaking Pangaea
- Bury Your Dead
- Codeseven
- Dead to Fall
- Glasseater
- Long Since Forgotten
- Moneen
- Not Waving but Drowning
- This Day Forward
- Uphill Battle

==== Saturday, July 13 ====
===== Main Stage =====
- All Else Failed
- American Nightmare
- Caliban
- Camp Kill Yourself
- From Autumn to Ashes
- The Hope Conspiracy
- Misfits
- Reach the Sky
- Shai Hulud
- Stretch Arm Strong
- Skycamefalling
- Unearth

===== B Stage =====
- Bleeding Through
- Burnt by the Sun
- Coheed and Cambria
- Count the Stars
- Evergreen Terrace
- Face the Fact
- Found Dead Hanging
- If Hope Dies
- The Last Season
- The Red Chord
- The Rise
- Terror
- The Year of Our Lord

===== C Stage =====
- Avenged Sevenfold
- Burning Bridges
- Ed Gein
- Eiffel
- Himsa
- Knives Out
- The Minor Times
- One Fifth
- Remembering Never
- Saving Throw
- This Afternoon
- Twelve Tribes
- Until the End

==== Sunday, July 14 ====
===== Main Stage =====
- Asherah
- Cro-Mags
- Curl Up and Die
- xDisciplex A.D.
- Eighteen Visions
- Ensign
- Hatebreed
- Lamb of God
- Merauder
- Most Precious Blood
- The Promise
- Throwdown

===== B Stage =====
- A Static Lullaby
- The Black Dahlia Murder
- Brandtson
- Commit Suicide
- Death Threat
- Kalibas
- One Nation Under
- Shattered Realm
- Suicide Note
- Time in Malta
- Undying
- The Wage of Sin
- What Feeds the Fire

===== C Stage =====
- A Death for Every Sin
- The Blood Brothers
- Blood Has Been Shed
- The Cancer Conspiracy
- Circle of Dead Children
- Dead Wrong
- Harakiri
- Homesick for Space
- Lickgoldensky
- Light Is the Language
- Martyr A.D.
- Ringworm
- Sworn Enemy

==== Notes ====
The 2002 edition was the first to feature three stages.

=== July 4–6, 2003: Hellfest 2K3 ===
Location: New York State Fairgrounds, 581 State Fair Boulevard, Syracuse, New York / Planet 505, 505 Westcott Street, Syracuse, New York.

==== Friday, July 4 ====
===== Stage A =====
- As I Lay Dying
- Blood Has Been Shed
- Chimaira
- Curl Up and Die
- Kittie
- Lamb of God
- Majority Rule
- Misery Signals
- Soilwork
- Undying
- Unearth

===== Stage B =====
- A Life Once Lost
- Anti-Flag
- Biohazard
- Darkest Hour
- Ed Gein
- Found Dead Hanging
- Himsa
- In Flames
- The Red Chord
- Walls of Jericho

===== Stage C =====
- A Perfect Murder
- Acacia
- Alexisonfire
- Cannae
- The Devil's Discipline
- Forever Yours
- Full Blown Chaos
- Kid Gorgeous
- On the Might of Princes
- Premonitions of War
- Suicide Note
- Tabula Rasa
- The Vacancy
- This Afternoon

===== After Party =====
- The Black Dahlia Murder
- Bodies in the Gears of the Apparatus
- Deadwater Drowning
- From a Second Story Window

==== Saturday, July 5 ====
===== Stage A =====
- A Static Lullaby
- Acceptance
- The A.K.A.s
- Bleeding Through
- The Bouncing Souls
- Dead Poetic
- Death Threat
- Further Seems Forever
- No Warning
- Onelinedrawing
- Thursday

===== Stage B =====
- Autopilot Off
- xDisciplex A.D.
- From Autumn to Ashes
- The Hope Conspiracy
- The Movielife
- My Chemical Romance
- Shai Hulud
- The Suicide File
- Terror
- Until the End

===== Stage C =====
- Albert React
- Anberlin
- Champion
- Days in Vain
- Dead to Fall
- Embrace Today
- Fire When Ready
- First Blood
- Jude the Obscure
- Love Is Red
- Murder by Death
- Spitalfield
- Stand and Fight
- This Day Forward

===== After Party =====
- A Fall Farewell
- If Hope Dies
- Scars of Tomorrow
- Taken

==== Sunday, July 6 ====
===== Stage A =====
- Brother's Keeper
- CKY
- Converge
- Every Time I Die
- Figure Four
- Freya
- Norma Jean
- Remembering Never
- Stretch Arm Strong
- The Takeover

===== Stage B =====
- Armor for Sleep
- Beloved
- The Dillinger Escape Plan
- Evergreen Terrace
- Hopesfall
- In Pieces
- The Locust
- NORA
- Skycamefalling
- Underoath

===== Stage C =====
- ArmsBendBack
- As Hope Dies
- Asherah
- The Bled
- The Break
- Comeback Kid
- Daughters
- Marrakech
- Merciana
- On Broken Wings
- Scarlet
- Sinai Beach
- Tokyo
- With Honor

==== Notes ====
The 2003 edition was the first to have official after-party concerts, which were held at Planet 505 in Syracuse on the first two nights. It was the last event to be held in New York; the festival would move to New Jersey for its final two years.

=== July 23–25, 2004: Hellfest 2004 ===
Location: RexPlex, 2 Ikea Drive, Elizabeth, New Jersey.

==== Friday, July 23 ====
===== Main Stage =====
- The A.K.A.s
- All Else Failed
- As I Lay Dying
- The Ataris
- Champion
- Draw Blood
- Every Time I Die
- Folly
- Found Dead Hanging
- Halifax
- Himsa
- The Juliana Theory
- Mastodon
- Misfits
- Norma Jean
- The Red Chord
- Remembering Never
- Sick of It All
- Shadows Fall
- Spitalfield
- Strike Anywhere
- Suffocation
- Terror
- Unearth

===== Hot Topic Stage =====
- Adelphi
- All That Remains
- Anterrabae
- Bigwig
- Broke Neck
- Burnt by the Sun
- Day of Contempt
- Engineer
- Ensign
- Glasseater
- Hawthorne Heights
- Pig Destroyer
- Premonitions of War
- Sycamore Dreams
- Today Is the Day
- Your Enemies Friends

===== Dinosaur Stage =====
- 100 Demons
- The Calico System
- The Dead Season
- Ed Gein
- Full Blown Chaos
- Nag Hamadi
- The Oval Portrait
- Saving Throw
- Starting to Wonder
- Through the Discipline
- Time in Malta
- Walk the Line
- With Honor

==== Saturday, July 24 ====
===== Main Stage =====
- Agnostic Front
- Andrew W.K.
- Avail
- Bane
- The Banner
- Blood for Blood
- Bury Your Dead
- Caliban
- E-Town Concrete
- Evergreen Terrace
- The Hope Conspiracy
- The Killing
- Killswitch Engage
- Love Is Red
- Martyr A.D.
- Mest
- No Hollywood Ending
- NORA
- Odd Project
- Roses Are Red
- Scars of Tomorrow
- Shattered Realm
- Stretch Arm Strong
- Underoath
- Until the End
- Zao

===== Hot Topic Stage =====
- Beloved
- Between the Buried and Me
- Blacklisted
- Comeback Kid
- DRI
- Drive Without
- Drowningman
- Embrace Today
- For the Love of...
- Horse the Band
- Let it Die
- No Redeeming Social Value
- Nothing Left to Mourn
- Prayer for Cleansing
- The World/Inferno Friendship Society

===== Dinosaur Stage =====
- Dead to Fall
- xDEATHSTARx
- Figure Four
- The Judas Cradle
- Malice Aforethought
- The Minor Times
- Misery Index
- Only Crime
- Park
- Reflux
- Suffocate Faster
- To the Grave
- Undying

==== Sunday, July 25 ====
===== Main Stage =====
- A Thousand Falling Skies
- Alexisonfire
- Bear vs. Shark
- Bleeding Through
- Cannae
- Converge
- Death by Stereo
- Death Threat
- The Dillinger Escape Plan
- Fear Factory
- Fordirelifesake
- If Hope Dies
- It Dies Today
- Life of Agony
- Most Precious Blood
- Shai Hulud
- Sworn Enemy
- Throwdown
- Walls of Jericho

===== Hot Topic Stage =====
- 25 Ta Life
- A Life Once Lost
- A Perfect Murder
- Bad Luck 13 Riot Extravaganza
- Breath of Silence
- The Bronx
- Endwell
- Fear Before the March of Flames
- From a Second Story Window
- Merauder
- Misery Signals
- Planes Mistaken for Stars
- The Promise
- Stars Turn Cold
- Zombie Apocalypse

===== Dinosaur Stage =====
- The Acacia Strain
- The Autumn Offering
- Drive By
- Dry Kill Logic
- Flat Earth Society
- Forever Is Forgotten
- Last Perfection
- Psyopus
- Stabbed by Words
- Wings of Scarlet
- With Dead Hands Rising

==== Notes ====
The 2004 edition was the first edition to be held in New Jersey. In addition to the concerts, the RexPlex offered a skate park, indoor paintball, arcades, laser tag and the Hellfest Tattoo Festival.

=== August 19–21, 2005: Hellfest '05 ===
Location: Sovereign Bank Arena, 81 Hamilton Avenue, Trenton, New Jersey.

==== Friday, August 19 * ====
===== Main Stage A: 1x1 Music =====
- All That Remains
- Architect
- Cryptopsy
- Hatebreed
- Killing Time
- Madball
- Scars of Tomorrow
- Sick of It All
- Unearth
- The Warriors

===== Main Stage B: Peta2 =====
- Chimaira
- Converge
- He Is Legend
- Misfits
- Nile
- Suffocation
- Turmoil
- With Honor
- Zao

===== Outdoor Stage A: Goodfellow Records/Abacus Recordings =====
- All Else Failed
- Curl Up and Die
- Donnybrook
- Doomriders
- Ed Gein
- Embrace the End
- Embrace Today
- From a Second Story Window
- Full Blown Chaos
- Modern Life Is War
- Shattered Realm
- Winter Solstice

===== Outdoor Stage B: Eulogy Recordings =====
- 100 Demons
- 3 Inches of Blood
- A Wilhelm Scream
- Betrayed
- Buried Inside
- Cursed
- Dead to Fall
- God Forbid
- If Hope Dies
- The Minor Times
- Six Feet Under
- Sworn Enemy

===== Outdoor Stage C: Hot Topic =====
- Alove For Enemies
- Animosity
- Arms Race
- Cancer Bats
- Cannae
- Demiricous
- Fixer
- Ghosts of War
- Kids Like Us
- The Killing
- Nine Will Die
- No Redeeming Social Value
- Nobody Left Behind
- Nodes of Ranvier
- Rumplestiltskin Grinder
- Seventh Star
- Stemm
- Stray from the Path
- Summer's End
- This Is Hell

==== Saturday, August 20 * ====
===== Main Stage A: 1x1 Music =====
- 108
- Bold
- The Bouncing Souls
- Champion
- Coalesce
- Marathon
- Mean Season
- NORA
- Public Enemy
- Strike Anywhere

===== Main Stage B: Peta2 =====
- Against Me!
- BoySetsFire
- Evergreen Terrace
- Good Clean Fun
- Lifetime
- None More Black
- Outspoken
- Terror
- The Unseen

===== Outdoor Stage A: Goodfellow Records/Abacus Recordings =====
- As Cities Burn
- Blacklisted
- Classic Case
- Ensign
- Fall River
- The Jonbenét
- Long Since Forgotten
- Most Precious Blood
- Paint it Black
- The Secret
- Suffocate Faster
- Triple Threat

===== Outdoor Stage B: Eulogy Recordings =====
- Fire When Ready
- Gym Class Heroes
- Hidden in Plain View
- Hit the Lights
- Houston Calls
- Over It
- Planes Mistaken for Stars
- Misery Signals
- New Atlantic
- Since the Flood
- Smoke or Fire
- Spitalfield

===== Outdoor Stage C: Hot Topic =====
- Above this Fire
- Anorexic Beauty Queen
- Backstabbers Incorporated
- Burning Season
- Casey Jones
- Colin of Arabia
- Dead Hearts
- The Fire Still Burns
- Glass and Ashes
- One Dead Three Wounded
- Manntis
- MC Goldie Wilson
- Mikoto
- North Side Kings
- Ready Set Fail
- Sons of Azrael
- Swarm of the Lotus
- Twilight Transmission
- Walk the Line
- When Tigers Fight

==== Sunday, August 21 * ====
===== Main Stage A: 1x1 Music =====
- As I Lay Dying
- The Banner
- Between the Buried and Me
- Comeback Kid
- From Autumn to Ashes
- Haste the Day
- It Dies Today
- Killswitch Engage
- The Red Chord
- Throwdown

===== Main Stage B: Peta2 =====
- Anti-Flag
- The Casualties
- Emery
- Norma Jean
- Remembering Never
- Rise Against
- Silverstein
- Stretch Arm Strong
- Symphony in Peril

===== Outdoor Stage A: Goodfellow Records/Abacus Recordings =====
- The Beautiful Mistake
- Bedlight for Blue Eyes
- The Chariot
- The End
- The Esoteric
- Kane Hodder
- The Loved Ones
- Psyopus
- The Red Death
- Sinai Beach
- Still Remains
- Today Is the Day

===== Outdoor Stage B: Eulogy Recordings =====
- A Hero From a Thousand Paces
- The Acacia Strain
- The Agony Scene
- The A.K.A.s
- Anterrabae
- Calico System
- Death Before Dishonor
- Ion Dissonance
- Roses Are Red
- The Showdown
- Spitfire
- Tension

===== Outdoor Stage C: Hot Topic =====
- 2 Cents
- A Murder of Crows
- At All Cost
- Between Walls
- Bled Across Miles
- Bloodjinn
- Bloodlined Calligraphy
- Cold War
- FC Five
- Final Word
- Horse The Band
- I Am Idaho
- The Last Season
- Life in Pictures
- Look What I Did
- Outbreak
- Ramallah
- Scary Kids Scaring Kids
- Silhouette
- The Tony Danza Tapdance Extravaganza

==== Notes ====
* Hellfest '05 was cancelled and none of the concerts were played. The schedule above was the one announced prior to the cancellation and is presented here for preservation.

This was the first event to feature five stages on each day.

Discrepancies between Paper Street Music (Hellfest's organizer and promoter) and the venue caused the event to be cancelled less than thirty-six hours before starting. A number of the bands originally scheduled for Hellfest planned last-minute alternative shows in the Tri-State Region. Several threats of lawsuits were announced in the news, from the promoters, the venue, the bands and the fans who had not been refunded for their tickets, but so far none have made it to court.

=== July 5-6, 2025: Hellphyra ===
Location: Williams Center, 15 Sylvan Street, Rutherford, New Jersey.

==== Saturday, July 5 ====
===== North Stage =====
- Asphyxiated
- Azshara
- Drawing Last Breath
- Dying Fetus
- Haywire
- Internal Bleeding
- Invocation of Nehek
- It Dies Today
- Khasm
- Missing Link
- Prayer For Cleansing
- Scarab
- Soulless
- Start Today
- Watch You Fall

===== South Stage =====
- Balmora
- Blackest Dawn
- Cross of Disbelief
- Draped In Black
- Ends of Sanity
- Final Resting Place
- Frozen Ground
- Godskin Peeler
- Hamartia
- On Broken Wings
- onelinedrawing

==== Sunday, July 6 ====
===== North Stage =====
- bulletsbetweentongues
- Disembodied
- Eighteen Visions
- Fifteen Rhema
- Holder
- I Promised The World
- Recon
- Skycamefalling
- Zao

===== South Stage =====
- Beyond Repair
- Contention
- Embrace Today
- Empty Shell Casing
- In 2 Again
- Kidnapped
- Sin Against Sin

==== Notes ====
This fest was the first to be organized with the help of Connecticut based label Ephyra Recordings, and featured many bands on or associated with the label. Takedown Records was also associated with this fest. An additional July 4 date titled "Hellfest Presents: New Jersey Hardcore" also took place, entirely featuring bands from the state of New Jersey, including E.Town Concrete, Bayway, Folly, NORA, Bulldoze, The Banner, Years Spent Cold, Roseblood, Discontent, XL Bully, Pool Scum, Hindsight, and Manic.

=== February 20-21: Hellfest West ===
Location: The Observatory, 3503 South Harbor Boulevard, Santa Ana, California.

==== Friday, February 20 ====
===== Main Stage =====
- Arkangel
- Crush Your Soul
- Elysia
- I Promised The World
- It Dies Today
- Kickback
- Load Tha Nine
- Outta Pocket
- Shattered Realm
- Staple
- Twitching Tongues

===== Constellation Stage =====
- Bloodshed
- Day of Suffering
- Downpressor
- Invocation of Nehek
- Negative Force
- Sin Against Sin
- Skycamefalling

==== Saturday, February 21 ====
===== Main Stage =====
- Beyond Repair
- Disembodied
- Fatal Realm
- Four Winds Away
- Frozen Ground
- Mindforce
- No Innocent Victim
- Path of Resistance
- Recon
- Turmoil
- Years Spent Cold

===== Constellation Stage =====
- Balmora
- Bayway
- The Beautiful Mistake
- Guilt.
- Kids Like Us
- Morning Again
- Start Today

==== Notes ====
This would be the first edition to be held in the winter, as well as the first edition to be held on the west coast of the United States, as opposed to all others being in the New Jersey area.

There were two official pre-shows and two official post-shows in the area associated with the fest. The first pre-show was on February 18 at 1720 Warehouse in Los Angeles, California, with I Promised The World, Balmora, and Start Today, and the second was on February 19 at the Constellation Stage in The Observatory with Eighteen Visions, Azshara, Watch You Fall, Khasm, Exutoire, and Left Hand Path. The first post-show was on February 22 at 1720 Warehouse with Kickback, Missing Link, Recon, Shattered Realm, Years Spent Cold, Section H8, and Bloodshed. The second post-show was also on February 22 with Turmoil, Disembodied, and Ursula at Programme Skate & Sound in Fullerton, California.

=== July 3-5, 2026: Hellfest 2026 ===
Location: Carteret Performing Arts Center, 46 Washington Street, Carteret, New Jersey.

==== Friday, July 3 ====
- Advent
- Anhedonia
- Bayway
- Bleeding Through
- Concealer
- Defy You
- Disembodied
- The Distance
- Dream Fatigue
- Earth Crisis
- For The Fallen Dreams
- Hold My Own
- Jerome
- Nehemiah
- Orthodox
- Recon
- Sanction
- The Shape
- Too Pure To Die
- Speechless At Gunpoint
- Suicide Silence
- Too Pure To Die
- Turmoil
- Wings of Scarlet

==== Saturday, July 4 ====
- Awaiting Eschiel
- Azshara
- Big Boy
- Bloodshed
- Catalyst
- Devourment
- Face Yourself
- Final Resting Place
- First Blood
- Harvest
- Hatebreed
- Holder
- Killing Me Softly
- Negative Force
- Outta Pocket
- xSERAPHx
- Snuffed on Sight
- Terror
- Twitching Tongues
- Vision of Disorder
- Volcano
- Wielded Steel
- XL Bully
- Years Spent Cold

==== Sunday, July 5 ====
- 100 Demons
- Away With Words
- Discontent
- Elysia
- Fallen God
- Fatal Realm
- Gates To Hell
- Glassjaw
- Guilt.
- Haywire
- I Promised The World
- Impunity *
- In Loving Memory
- Inclination
- Koyo
- Laid 2 Rest
- Living Weapon
- Neolithic
- Old Wounds
- OLTH
- Point of Contact
- Rosasharin
- Shattered Realm
- Sin Against Sin
- XweaponX

==== Notes ====
* Impunity was ultimately unable to play the fest due to a few members of the band not having their visas approved to enter the US. Fallen God, who was initially supposed to play day one but had to drop due to scheduling conflicts, ended up playing day three instead in their place.

Bayway's set doubled as a music video shoot for their song Run and Hide Bitch.

The fest initially took place at The Dome, a golf driving range at Adventure Crossing in Jackson Township, New Jersey. On June 12, 2026, it was announced that the fest would be moved to Maggie's Fairgrounds in Lakewood Township, New Jersey, due to the state of New Jersey determining that The Dome at Adventure Crossing was no longer fit to host specialty events. On June 24, Hellfest was once again moved to the Carteret Performing Arts Center in Carteret, New Jersey.

The fest also had two official pre-shows and two post-shows, similar to Hellfest West earlier that year. The two pre-shows took place on July 2, with one being at The Palace in Philadelphia, Pennsylvania, featuring Orthodox, Turmoil, Concealer, Advent, and By My Blood, and the other being at Market Hotel in Brooklyn, New York, featuring For the Fallen Dreams, Recon, OLTH, The Partisan Turbine, and Swordpath. The first post-show took place immediately after Hatebreed's set on day two of the fest on July 4 in the same venue, featuring Disembodied, Xibalba, and Fail You. The second post-show took place on July 6 at House of Independents in Asbury Park, New Jersey, featuring Elysia, I Promised The World, Years Spent Cold, Atomic Rule, Concealer, and Our Lady of Burning Thorns.

== Hellfest Battle of the Bands ==
In 2004, Hellfest sponsored an official battle of the bands contests, both nationally and in Central New Jersey, giving the chance to unsigned bands the opportunity of playing the festival's stages. New Jersey bands were required to enter the local competition organized by concert promoter Excess dB Entertainment, while national acts could apply through //radiotakover's competition.

=== Excess dB Entertainment's Hellfest Battle of the Bands ===
The Excess dB Entertainment Battle of the Bands contest offered a total of fifteen prizes: nine Hellfest playing slots for first-place winners and six Excess dB Entertainment concert playing slots for second and third-place winners. The competition was held over three days, two at Club Krome in Sayreville, New Jersey, and one at Cricket Club in Irvington, New Jersey. Five winners were picked at the end of each event by a selection of judges from the New Jersey hardcore community. The judges were Carl Severson (owner of Ferret Music), Alex Saavedra (owner of Eyeball Records), Josh Grabelle (owner of Trustkill Records), Fred Feldman (owner of Triple Crown Records), Kyle Kraszewski (owner of No Milk Records), Joanna Angel (owner of BurningAngels), Andrew D. Keller (A&R scout at Columbia Records), Michelle and Stacy (writers at The Aquarian Weekly), DJ Rob, DJ Ralph and DJ Q (disc jockeys at WSOU), Geoff Rickly (vocalist of the band Thursday) and Evange Livanos (promoter at FATA Booking).

The bands Endwell, Malice Aforethought, Flat Earth Society, Nothing Left to Mourn, The Dead Season, Breath of Silence, Sycamore Dreams, Nag Hamadi and Starting to Wonder all won first place and played at Hellfest 2004. Endwell, Nothing Left to Mourn, Breath of Silence and Sycamore Dreams played on the Hot Topic Stage, while Malice Aforethought, Flat Earth Society, The Dead Season, Nag Hamadi and Starting to Wonder played on the Dinosaur Stage.

==== June 13, 2004: Club Krome Battle of the Bands 1 ====
===== Main Room =====
- Away from it All
- Blind Hate Experiment
- Blood of a Prophet
- Burnt to Ashes
- The Death of a Celebrity
- Euclid
- Forgetting Tomorrow
- Gray Lines of Perfection
- Last to Fall
- The Lionel Crush
- Lost in Silence
- Muk Cage
- Nag Hamadi
- No Tactics
- One Step Away
- Stafford
- Sycamore Dreams
- Tears Shall Fall
- Well Kept Secret
- The Years Gone By
- Zamora

===== Lounge =====
- 7 Inch Furniture
- A Faint Farewell
- And Tragedy Struck
- All for Nothing
- Between Love and Murder
- Broken View
- Deny All
- First Born Death
- Forrester
- Funeral Not a Fight
- Hellfire Kansas
- Left to Die
- Minotar
- No Longer Silent
- Quantice Never Crashed
- xSPINKICKx
- Starting to Wonder
- Strike 4
- Twilight City Fracture
- Undying Morals
- The Wake

==== June 19, 2004: Cricket Club Battle of the Bands ====
===== Upstairs Room =====
- A Dying Declaration
- A Match Like Memory
- Above All Hope
- Athens Is Burning
- The Closest Point to Nowhere
- The Dead Season
- Ehrhardt
- Fall of the Sacred
- For the Sake of Dying
- Last Will
- Moira
- No Dice
- Nothing Left to Mourn
- Sacred Hatred
- Sanctify
- Shattering Elysium
- Smalltown Tragedy
- Social Suicide
- Strength in Numbers
- The Style
- This Means Everything
- Turncoat

===== Downstairs Room =====
- A True Story
- Breath of Silence
- Catatonic
- Choke Powder
- Dead End Saints
- Death By Names
- Divinity Condemned
- Divulgence
- Evelyn Hope
- Iced Over Phoenix
- Killed by Memories
- Novelty Tag
- Quick Kill Formula
- Red Skies
- Robots Are Good Lovers
- Sarins Gift
- The Smash Up
- Sky Set Unfold
- The Sleep Process
- Slipping to Death
- Twicethecreator
- Wait Until Dark

==== June 27, 2004: Club Krome Battle of the Bands 2 ====
===== Main Room =====
- A Fallen Day
- Ashes to Mourn
- Before I Burn
- Bleed the Rose
- Broadway
- Broken Word
- Death to Honor
- Defire
- Drive By
- Endwell
- Evelyn Adali
- Flat Earth Society
- The Homicide Blueprint
- Karmacide
- Lines of Hatred
- Lucked Out
- Rally Days
- Red Hill
- Screaming for Silence
- Sicks Deep
- Through Dead Eyes
- Twizted Mindz
- Undercut
- Waiting on Wendy

===== Lounge =====
- Amnion
- Avatar
- Black Sand and Starless Nights
- The Color of War
- The Concubine
- Dead 2 Rights
- Eight is Enough
- Had This Day Not Been
- Hari-Kari
- The In between
- Leviathan
- Life No Longer
- Machete for Hands
- Malice Aforethought
- Moraine
- One Brick Down
- Open Your Eyes
- Self Explanatory
- Send 72
- Soundtrack of Your Life
- State of The Art
- Through a Windshield
- Torn to Shreds
- Words on a Page

=== //radiotakover's Hellfest Battle of the Bands ===
The //radiotakeover Battle of the Bands contest was sponsored by Hot Topic, Revolver, Hopeless Records and Trustkill Records. Instead of hosting live shows and judging the bands by their live performances, this Battle of the Bands was hosted digitally with artists submitting pre-recorded songs to //radiotakover's website using a user-based voting system. Bands were required to pay a $5 entry fee and submit their songs between May 7–14, 2004; but due to an overwhelming response, the deadline was extended to June 21, 2004. The eleven top-voted bands were selected on June 21, 2004, and presented to a judging panel of industry professionals (likely the same judges from Excess dB Entertainment's Battle of the Bands). The judging panel had four days to select the winners, based on a single song, which were scheduled to be announced on Friday, June 25, 2004, but was delayed to Monday, June 28, 2004. The Grand Prize winner was given a slot on Hellfest's main stage, accommodations and expenses for the weekend of the event, as well as inclusion on the documentary DVD scheduled to be released by HighRoller Studios (which was ultimately shelved). First Prize winners received slots on Hellfest's Hot Topic stage, free passes to attend the event and free Hellfest merchandise, but were required to provide their own accommodations. Runner up winners (Second Place and Third Place winners) received free passes to attend the event and free Hellfest merchandise.

==== Winners ====
The list of winners was announced along with the selected songs upon which they were judged. The top four bands were given playing spots at Hellfest 2004; the Grand Prize winner on the Main Stage, and the three First Prize winners on the Hot Topic Stage.

Place	Band	Song
Grand Prize	Odd Project	The Phone Is Such a Blunt Object
First Prize	Broke Neck	Penguins are Awfully Cute
First Prize	Let it Die	Already Dead
First Prize	Stars Turn Cold	The Uncertainties Never Seemed so Uncertain
Second Place	Abeyance	Another God Fails
Second Place	Holiday	Midnight Sun
Second Place	She Dies in December	Last Goodnight
Second Place	Silence After Tragedy	Changing the Tide
Second Place	Thieves and Assassins	White Noise
Third Place	Coldwater Tragedy	The Inevitable Fact That
Third Place	Tomorrow Will be Worse	Revelation

== Home media releases ==
All Hellfest events have been filmed, either by fans or by professional production companies. However, only three official VHS/DVDs have been released.

=== Hellfest Syracuse, NY - Summer 2000: The Official Documentary ===
Hellfest Syracuse, NY - Summer 2000: The Official Documentary was the first officially released video recording of 2000's Hellfest 2K. It was released on VHS and DVD by Trustkill Records on June 12, 2001, and features live footage, interviews, commentaries by fifteen bands, the majority of which were already signed to Trustkill Records.

==== Track listing ====
Credits are adapted from the VHS/DVD's liner notes.

No.	Title	Band	Length
1.	"Interview"	Poison the Well	0:00
2.	"Slice Paper Wrists"	Poison the Well	0:00
3.	"Interview"	Shai Hulud	0:00
4.	"My Heart Bleeds the Darkest Blood"	Shai Hulud	0:00
5.	"Interview"	Buried Alive	0:00
6.	"Worthless"	Buried Alive	0:00
7.	"Interview"	Brother's Keeper	0:00
8.	"God Damn Son of a Bitch"	Brother's Keeper	0:00
9.	"Interview"	One King Down	0:00
10.	"Gravity Wins Again"	One King Down	0:00
11.	"Interview"	Bane	0:00
12.	"What Makes Us Strong / Superhero"	Bane	0:00
13.	"Conduit"	Converge	0:00
14.	"Interview"	Every Time I Die	0:00
15.	"Your Touch Versus Death"	Every Time I Die	0:00
16.	"Interview"	Eighteen Visions	0:00
17.	"Who Killed John Lennon?"	Eighteen Visions	0:00
18.	"Interview"	Reach the Sky	0:00
19.	"World Stands Still"	Reach the Sky	0:00
20.	"Interview"	Walls of Jericho	0:00
21.	"A Day and a Thousand Years"	Walls of Jericho	0:00
22.	"Interview"	NORA	0:00
23.	"The Neverendingyouline"	NORA	0:00
24.	"Color Me Blood Red"	Converge	0:00
25.	"Interview"	Eighteen Visions	0:00
26.	"The Psychotic Thought That Satan Gave Jesus"	Eighteen Visions	0:00
27.	"Interview"	Poison the Well	0:00
28.	"Nerdy"	Poison the Well	0:00
29.	"Interview"	Bane	0:00
30.	"Can We Start Again?"	Bane	0:00
31.	"Interview"	Walls of Jericho	0:00
32.	"Why Father"	Walls of Jericho	0:00
33.	"Interview"	The Hope Conspiracy	0:00
34.	"Escapist"	The Hope Conspiracy	0:00
35.	"Interview"	Brother's Keeper	0:00
36.	"Cranium"	Brother's Keeper	0:00
37.	"Interview"	Shai Hulud	0:00
38.	"Solely Concentrating on the Negative Aspects of Life"	Shai Hulud	0:00
39.	"Interview"	One King Down	0:00
40.	"More Hate Than Fear"	One King Down	0:00
41.	"Interview"	Idle Hands	0:00
42.	"Treaty"	Idle Hands	0:00
43.	"Interview"	Killswitch Engage	0:00
44.	"Vide Infra"	Killswitch Engage	0:00
45.	"Interview"	Buried Alive	0:00
46.	"Kill Their Past"	Buried Alive	0:00
47.	"Interview"	Poison the Well	0:00
48.	"Artist's Rendering of Me"	Poison the Well	0:00
49.	"The Saddest Day"	Converge	0:00
Total length:			00:00

==== Personnel ====
- Doug Spangenberg – director, editor
- Josh Grabelle – executive producer, layout, design
- John McKaig – photography
- Jessica Lynn – photography
- Jon Tumillo – photography

=== Hellfest 2002 ===
(2 discs) (released January 6, 2004):

Featuring live performances from Coheed and Cambria, Bleeding Through, Hatebreed, Merauder, NORA, Open Hand, Freya, Throwdown, Lamb of God, Bloodlet, Eighteen Visions, Most Precious Blood, Terror, Death Threat and more.

=== Hellfest Vol III: Official Video Documentary Filmed Live At Hellfest 2003 In Syracuse ===
(2 discs) (released July 13, 2004):

Featuring live performances from Anti-Flag, Thursday, The Dillinger Escape Plan, Norma Jean, Lamb of God, Murder By Death, Walls of Jericho, The Bled, Terror, From Autumn to Ashes, CKY, Comeback Kid, My Chemical Romance, Full Blown Chaos, The Locust, Biohazard, Unearth, Bleeding Through, Bouncing Souls and more.

Hellfest's final year, the 2004 weekend at Rexplex, Elizabeth, New Jersey was filmed by High Roller Studios to be released on DVD, but the footage was never released publicly. When High Roller Studios ended, their MySpace page (www.myspace.com/highrollerstudios) explained the company's reason for disbanding, adding that the Hellfest DVD would never be released. Unbeknownst to most, the entire 2004 DVD had been edited and was ready for release, however Radiotakeover president Shawn Van Der Poel had failed to negotiate agreements with the bands that would have appeared on the multi-disc set.

Director Doug Spangenberg and editor Anderson Bradshaw went on to form a new video production company (Space Monkey Studios, Inc.).

Hellfest 2001/2004 Resurrection (July 2013):

In the summer of 2013, Doug Spangenberg gave the surviving tapes from Hellfests 2001 and 2004 to hate5six so that the sets could be properly edited and released to the public for free. This long-term project promises to make the "lost" footage available in an ad-free and non-commercial setting.
