= Furnace Fest =

American music festival

- Furnace Fest's logo since 2019.
- Genre: Christian hardcore; emo; hardcore punk; metalcore; post-hardcore; punk rock
- Dates: August, September, October
- Locations: Sloss Furnaces, Birmingham, Alabama
- Coordinates: 33.51936024°N 86.79293104°W
- Years active: 2000–2003, 2021–Present
- Founders: Chad Johnson
- Organiser: Takehold Records (2000–2002); Anxiety Records (2003–2004); Furnace Fest LLC (2019–present)
- Website: furnacefest.us

Furnace Fest is an American music festival held over three days at the Sloss Furnaces National Historical Landmark in Birmingham, Alabama. It ran annually each August from 2000 to 2003, and ran again from September 2021 to October 2024 when it was thought to be the final run, but in November 2024, Furnace Fest announced it would return in 2025.

The festival was founded in 2000 by Chad Johnson, then-owner of Birmingham-based Christian hardcore record label Takehold Records. Though many performers at Furnace Fest were Christian hardcore, metalcore and emo bands (including most bands signed to the aforementioned label), the event itself did not focus on religious beliefs. After Takehold Records was sold by Tooth & Nail Records in March 2002, which required Johnson moving to Seattle, Washington, the future of the festival was uncertain. Johnson successfully hosted a third edition in August 2002, and then briefly considered relocating the festival to Seattle. In August 2003, a DVD containing footage of Furnace Fest 2002 was released by 3B Studios.

In 2003, the organization of Furnace Fest was passed on to Shannon Schlappi, then-owner of Independence, Missouri-based hardcore record label Anxiety Records, who successfully organized a fourth edition of the festival at the same location. Schlappi intended to continue the festival in 2004, but due to heavy financial losses incurred from the 2003 event, and the owners of the Sloss Furnaces demanding an increase in rental price for the site, Furnace Fest was put on hold. Schlappi hoped to resume the festival in 2005, but it did not happen.

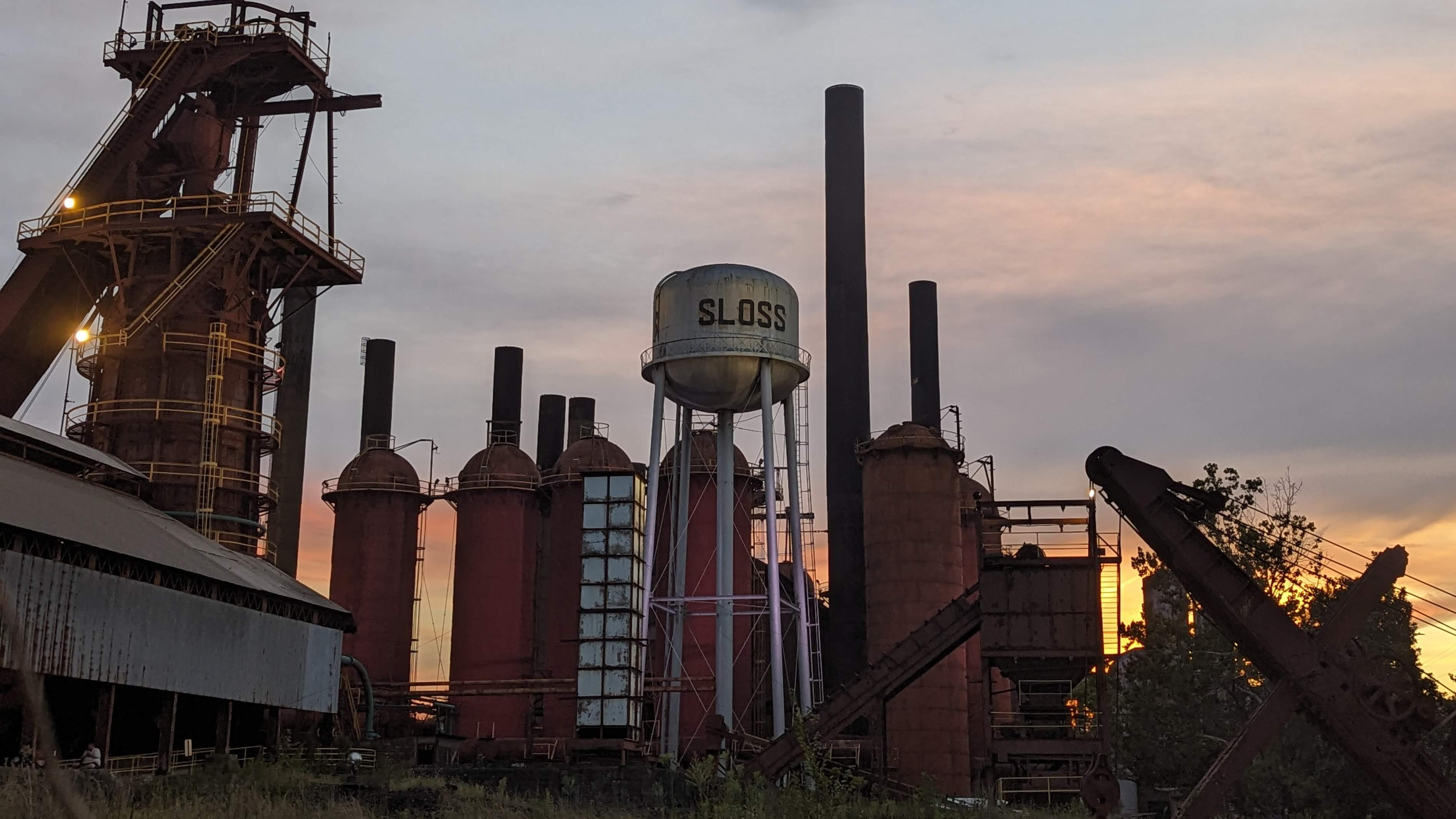
Sloss Furnaces, Birmingham in September 2023

In mid-2019, Johnson revived Furnace Fest and scheduled the fifth edition to take place from September 18–20, 2020. The official press release of the revived festival, along with news of the first confirmed band to be booked, Beloved, was announced on November 29, 2019. A Nashville, Tennessee-based limited liability company, Furnace Fest LLC, was formed on April 10, 2020, to control the legal interests of the festival. The new corporate structure is a four-way partnership divided between Johnny Grimes (based in Birmingham), Mike Ziemer (based in Dallas, Texas), Ryan Luther and Chad Johnson (both based in Nashville, Tennessee). On June 1, 2020, it was announced that the festival's fifth event had been postponed due to the COVID-19 pandemic, and most bands were automatically re-booked to perform at the rescheduled event, set to take place between May 14–16, 2021. By March 2021, the event had again been rescheduled, this time for September 24–26, 2021. The festival's sixth event took place from September 23–25, 2022. The final event of Furnace Fest was supposed to take place in October 2024 but in November 2024, Furnace Fest announced it would return in 2025.

== Furnace Fest lineups by year ==
=== August 11–13, 2000 ===
Notes: Overcome played its farewell show, and Strongarm performed a reunion show, both on Saturday, August 12, 2000. Caption, Pensive and Reach the Sky were also booked but did not perform.

==== Friday August 11 ====
- Burn It Down
- Candiria
- Eso-Charis
- Figure Four
- Forever and a Day
- Glasseater
- Isis
- Living Sacrifice
- Narcissus
- No Innocent Victim
- Not Waving but Drowning
- One Step Back
- Selfminded
- Squad Five-O
- Stairwell
- The Dillinger Escape Plan (headliners)
- Underoath
- Vessel
- Zao

==== Saturday August 12 ====
- A New Found Glory
- Brandtson
- Brother's Keeper
- Clenched Fist
- Disciple
- Esteem
- Few Left Standing
- Further Seems Forever
- Haste
- Overcome
- Shai Hulud
- Shockwave
- Stretch Arm Strong
- Strongarm (headliners)
- Tantrum of the Muse
- Terra Firma
- The Blamed
- The Casket Lottery
- Twothirtyeight
- Where Fear and Weapons Meet

==== Sunday August 13 ====
- Blindside
- Codeseven
- Cooter
- Crucible
- Embodyment
- Greycoat
- Hopesfall
- Legends of Rodeo
- Luti-Kriss
- No Comply
- Post-Offset
- Red Roses for a Blue Lady
- Redeem
- Slick Shoes
- Society's Finest
- Spitfire
- Tenderfoot
- The 65 Filmshow
- The Handshake Murders (headliners)
- The Jazz June
- The Juliana Theory

=== August 2–4, 2001 ===
Notes: Squad Five-O was booked but did not perform.

==== Thursday August 2 ====
- Drowningman
- Eighteen Visions
- Element 101
- Hatebreed
- Living Sacrifice (headliners)
- Luti-Kriss
- Narcissus
- No Innocent Victim
- River City High
- Spitfire
- Tantrum of the Muse
- The Huntingtons
- The Operation
- The Wednesdays
- Twelve Tribes
- Waterdown
- XDISCIPLEx A.D.
- Yellowcard

==== Friday August 3 ====
- Darkest Hour
- Dynamite Boy
- Fairweather
- Figure Four
- Further Seems Forever
- Gainer
- Haste
- Like David
- Not Waving but Drowning
- Shai Hulud
- Small Brown Bike
- Society's Finest
- Soilent Green
- The Stryder
- Twothirtyeight
- Underoath
- Unwed Sailor
- Zao (headliners)

==== Saturday August 4 ====
- As Friends Rust
- Bloodjinn
- Brandtson
- Brother's Keeper
- Converge (headliners)
- Elliott
- Few Left Standing
- Glasseater
- Ghoti Hook
- Hopesfall
- Junction 18
- New Found Glory
- Point of Recognition
- Reach the Sky
- Sleeping by the Riverside
- Stairwell
- Stretch Arm Strong
- The Hope Conspiracy

=== August 1–3, 2002 ===
Notes: The third edition of Furnace Fest was originally scheduled for the weekend of August 8–10, 2002, but it was moved up by a week. It was the first year to feature two stages; the Side Stage was sponsored by Century Media and its subsidiary Abacus Recordings. Zao announced that it would be playing its farewell show at Furnace Fest 2002, though the band ultimately decided to reform. Eso-Charis performed a reunion show at the festival. Coheed and Cambria, Meshuggah and Welton were booked but did not perform.

==== Thursday August 1 ====
===== Main Stage =====
- 7 Angels 7 Plagues
- A Static Lullaby
- Codeseven
- Curl Up and Die
- Death Threat
- From Autumn to Ashes
- Glasseater
- Haste
- Hatebreed (headliners)
- Hopesfall
- In Flames
- No Innocent Victim
- NORA
- Shai Hulud
- Skycamefalling
- Still Breathing
- Stretch Arm Strong
- Terror
- Thirty Two Frames

===== Side Stage =====
- Aislinn
- Die Radio Die
- Everbleeding
- Evergreen Terrace
- Fall with Me
- Falling Cycle
- Moneybags Gram
- Mortal Treason
- Nine Lives
- Over My Dead Body
- Such Is Life
- Taken
- The Handshake Murders
- The Mora Luna
- The Uriah Omen
- Time to Fly
- Under the Red (headliners)
- Unfisted

==== Friday August 2 ====
===== Main Stage =====
- Andrew W.K. (headliners)
- Avenged Sevenfold
- Bane
- Blindside
- BoySetsFire
- Eighteen Visions
- Eso-Charis
- Every Time I Die
- God Forbid
- Love Is Red
- Most Precious Blood
- Norma Jean
- One Nation Under
- Prevent Falls
- Snapcase
- Squad Five-O
- The Dillinger Escape Plan
- The Exit
- Throwdown

===== Side Stage =====
- Beloved
- Christiansen
- Cool Hand Luke
- Copeland
- Emanuel 7
- Farewell Hope
- Grandview
- In Clover (headliners)
- Light Is the Language
- Noise Ratchet
- Nourish the Flame
- Salt the Earth
- Stairwell
- Sworn Enemy
- The Ghost
- The Operation
- Time in Malta
- Twothirtyeight

==== Saturday August 3 ====
===== Main Stage =====
- Ace Troubleshooter
- Anberlin
- Brandtson
- Celebrity
- Dead Poetic
- Denison Marrs
- Elliott
- Further Seems Forever
- Living Sacrifice
- mewithoutyou
- Narcissus
- Pedro the Lion
- Roadside Monument
- Sick of It All
- The Casket Lottery
- The Pits
- Ultimate Fakebook
- Underoath
- Zao (headliners)

===== Side Stage =====
- As I Lay Dying
- Between the Buried and Me
- Bleeding Through (headliners)
- Breaking Pangea
- BoyWunder
- Dynamite Boy
- Kid Gorgeous
- Lost City Angels
- Marty A.D.
- Not Waving but Drowning
- Open Hand
- Safety in Numbers
- Symphony in Peril
- The Commercials
- The September Engagement
- The Young and the Useless
- This Day Forward
- Unearth

=== August 15–17, 2003 ===
Notes: Stretch Arm Strong's album Engage was released at Furnace Fest. Bayside, Evelynn, My Hotel Year, Rifles at Recess, Rogue Nation, Spitafield, The Black Dahlia Murder, The Death Campaign and The Backup Plan were booked but did not perform. Fordirelifesake was booked early on but pulled out due to a scheduling conflict with their Canadian tour.

==== Friday August 15 ====
===== Main Stage =====
- A Life Once Lost
- Anberlin
- As I Lay Dying
- Codeseven
- Copeland
- Dead Poetic
- Further Seems Forever (headliners)
- Haste
- Hopesfall
- Mae
- Minus the Bear
- Sincebyman
- Silverstein
- The Agony Scene
- This Day Forward

===== Side Stage =====
- Across Five Aprils
- Armor for Sleep
- Bear vs. Shark
- Boys Night Out
- Celebrity
- Christiansen
- Flattery Leads to Ruins
- Found Dead Hanging
- Halfacre Gunroom
- Haste the Day
- Mercury Switch
- Plate 6
- Rescue
- Staring Back

==== Saturday August 16 ====
===== Main Stage =====
- Andrew W.K.
- Avenged Sevenfold
- Finch
- Forever Is Forgotten
- Hatebreed
- Hum (headliners)
- In Reverent Fear
- Mastodon
- Promise the Ghost
- Rise Against
- Salt the Earth
- Shai Hulud
- Taking Back Sunday
- The Red Chord
- Unearth
- Vaux

===== Side Stage =====
- A Small Victory
- Analog
- Cold Remember
- Day Two (headliners)
- Die Radio Die
- Earthen
- Embrace Today
- From First to Last
- Love Is Red
- National Fire Theory
- Nehemiah
- Not Quite Bernadette
- Showbread
- Trelese
- Uses Fire
- With Honor

==== Sunday August 17 ====
===== Main Stage =====
- Anatomy of a Ghost
- Beloved
- Coma Eternal
- Evergreen Terrace
- Every Time I Die
- Fear Before the March of Flames
- Kid Gorgeous
- Martyr A.D.
- Norma Jean
- Saved by Grace
- Stretch Arm Strong (headliners)
- Terror
- The Bled
- Throwdown

===== Side Stage =====
- Comeback Kid
- Day of Contempt
- End of All
- From a Second Story Window
- Glasseater
- Ill Allegiance
- Scars of Tomorrow
- The A.K.A.s
- The Judas Cradle
- The Program
- The Takeover
- This Runs Through

=== September 24–26, 2021 ===
Notes: These were the bands at the time of the daily schedule being released. '68, As Friends Rust, Gideon, Glasseater, Hatebreed, Misery Signals, Open Hand, Poison the Well, and The Darling Fire were scheduled to play but unfortunately cancelled.

==== Friday, September 24 ====
===== Level X Stage (Main Stage) =====
- Underoath
- Thursday
- Every Time I Die
- Terror
- Cave In
- Emery
- Silent Planet
- If I Die First

===== Plug Your Holes Stage (The Shed) =====
- Converge
- Zao
- From Autumn To Ashes
- Eighteen Visions
- Haste
- Few Left Standing
- As Cities Burn
- Narcissus
- Defeater
- Across Five Aprils
- Reclaim The Empyre

===== HeartSupport Stage (The Pond) =====
- Walls of Jericho
- With Honor
- Stavesacre
- Luxury
- Terminal
- Unwed Sailor
- Astronoid
- End
- SeeYouSpaceCowboy
- Rivals
- Mr. Enc

==== Saturday, September 25 ====
===== Level X Stage (Main Stage) =====
- Taking Back Sunday
- Mayday Parade
- Anberlin
- The Bled
- Mae
- Cartel
- Scary Kids Scaring Kids
- He Is Legend

===== Plug Your Holes Stage (The Shed) =====
- Glassjaw
- Stretch Arm Strong
- Beloved
- Deafheaven
- Living Sacrifice
- Shai Hulud
- Hopesfall
- Bloodjinn
- Evergreen Terrace
- Better Off
- Nominee

===== HeartSupport Stage (The Pond) =====
- Further Seems Forever
- Mineral
- Touché Amoré
- Jeremy Enigk
- Codeseven
- The Appleseed Cast
- The Beautiful Mistake
- The Classic Crime
- All Get Out
- The Hollywood Horses
- For The Best

==== Sunday, September 26 ====
===== Level X Stage (Main Stage) =====
- Killswitch Engage
- August Burns Red
- Motionless In White
- Hot Water Music
- Face To Face
- Erra
- Fit For A King
- Varials

===== Plug Your Holes Stage (The Shed) =====
- Turnstile
- Knocked Loose
- BoySetsFire
- Darkest Hour
- Unearth
- Bury Your Dead
- Comeback Kid
- Piebald
- Love is Red
- Be Well
- Holy+Gold

===== HeartSupport Stage (The Pond) =====
- The Get Up Kids
- The Juliana Theory
- Anthony Green
- Showbread
- The Casket Lottery
- Microwave
- The Judas Cradle
- Bad Cop Bad Cop
- Dying Wish
- Meadows

=== September 23–25, 2022 ===
Notes: Most Precious Blood, Crossfaith and Open Hand were scheduled to perform but unfortunately cancelled.

==== Friday, September 23 ====
===== Wheelhouse Stage (Main Stage) =====
- Thrice (performing the Illusion of Safety)
- New Found Glory
- Alexisonfire
- Quicksand
- Norma Jean
- Anti-Flag
- Midtown
- Strung Out
- Impending Doom
- Dead To Fall
- One Step Closer

===== Plug Your Holes Stage (The Shed) =====
- Shadows Fall
- The Acacia Strain
- Stretch Arm Strong
- Madball
- Integrity
- E.Town Concrete
- Glasseater
- Close Your Eyes
- Morning Again
- Capra
- Forced Neglect

===== Baked Brothers Stage (The Pond) =====
- Movements
- Fiddlehead
- Angel Du$t
- Drug Church
- Apprehend
- The News Can Wait
- '68
- Games We Play
- Doll Skin
- The Darling Fire
- Fauxdeep

==== Saturday, September 24 ====
===== Wheelhouse Stage (Main Stage) =====
- Sunny Day Real Estate
- Manchester Orchestra
- The Ghost Inside
- Poison The Well
- Elliott (performing False Cathedrals)
- Cursive
- The Joy Formidable
- MyChildren MyBride
- Idle Threat
- Stay Lost
- Godseyes (contest winner)

===== Plug Your Holes Stage (The Shed) =====
- Blindside (performing Silence)
- Maylene and The Sons of Disaster
- Demon Hunter
- Earth Crisis
- Bleeding Through
- Figure Four
- Misery Signals
- Counterparts
- The Showdown
- Life in Your Way
- Advent

===== Baked Brothers Stage (The Pond) =====
- Pedro The Lion
- The Spill Canvas
- Five Iron Frenzy
- Squad 5-0
- Hidden in Plain View
- Roadside Monument
- The Appleseed Cast
- Stairwell
- Watashi Wa
- Mock Orange
- Joyboy

==== Sunday, September 25 ====
===== Wheelhouse Stage (Main Stage) =====
- Mastodon
- Descendents
- The Story So Far
- In Flames
- Periphery
- Lagwagon
- Four Year Strong (performing Enemy of The World)
- Spiritbox
- Comeback Kid
- Jesus Piece
- Orbit Culture

===== Plug Your Holes Stage (The Shed) =====
- American Nightmare
- Sick of it All
- Agnostic Front
- Avail
- Strike Anywhere
- Stick To Your Guns
- The Red Chord
- Kublai Khan
- Dying Wish
- Get The Shot
- Wristmeetrazor

===== Baked Brothers Stage (The Pond) =====
- Mom Jeans
- As Friends Rust
- Nothing
- Slow Crush
- A Wilhelm Scream
- Koyo
- The Higher
- Soul Glo
- Free Throw
- Belmont
- Just Like Heaven

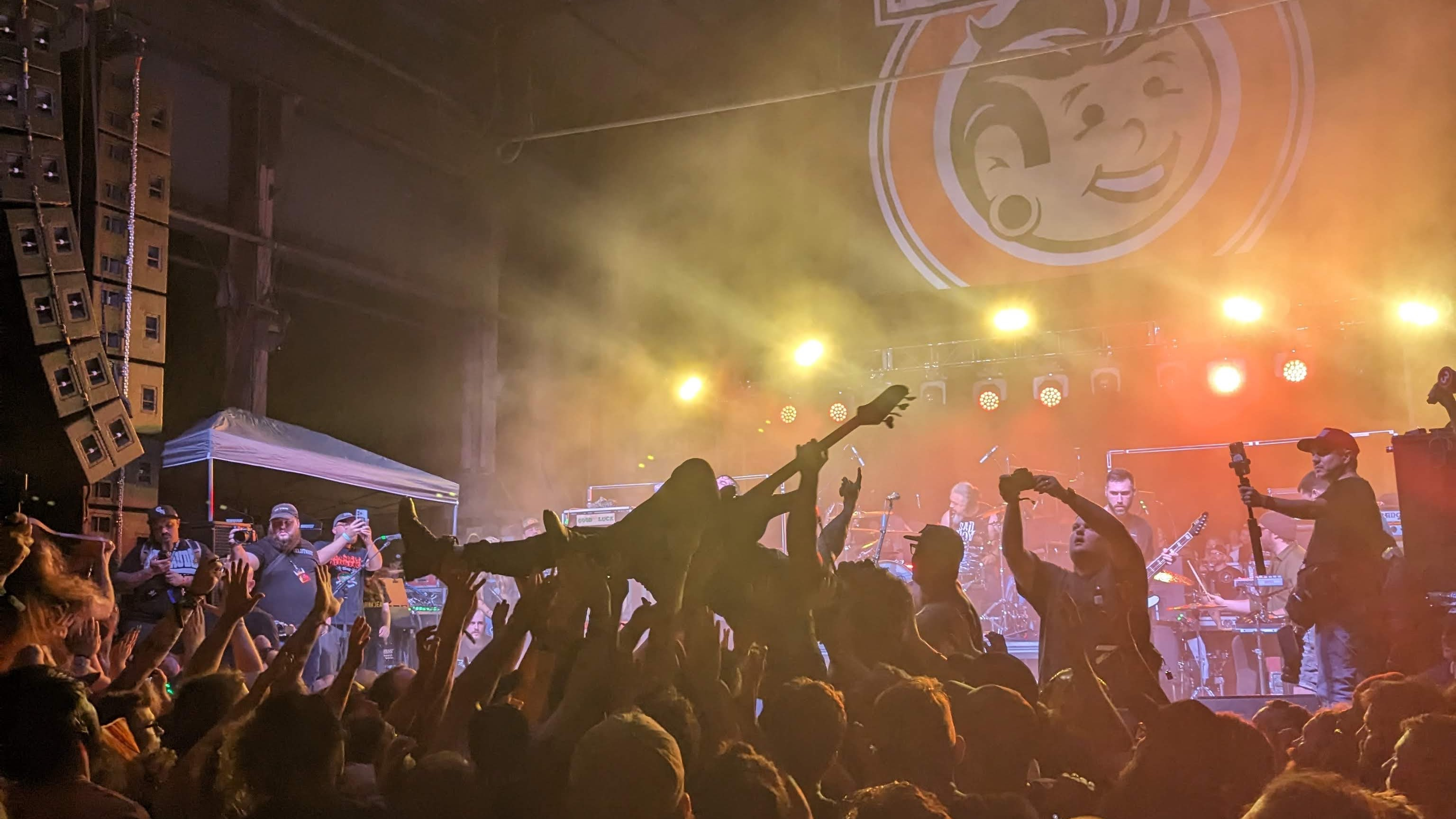
Norma Jean at Plug Your Holes Stage (The Shed) in 2023

=== September 22–24, 2023 ===
Notes: This is the list from the schedules released in August. Some changes were made. Trash Talk was moved to the Shed when Extol had to cancel. One person reported throwing their wristband in the trash after having found out that Extol was no longer playing and had already spent $400 in gas to drive across the country.

==== Friday, September 22 ====
===== Baked Brothers Stage (Main) =====
- The Undertaking
- Showbread
- Project 86
- Knuckle Puck
- Throwdown
- Relient K
- Anberlin
- MXPX

===== Plug Your Holes Stage (Shed) =====
- Slow Pulse
- No Cure
- Orthodox
- With Blood Comes Cleansing
- Vein.fm
- With Honor
- Walls Of Jericho
- Gideon
- Hopesfall
- Norma Jean
- Hatebreed

===== Monster Energy Stage (Pond) =====
- Whitsett
- Made Aware
- Qualifier
- Alcoa
- Holy Wars
- Kid Liberty
- Open Hand
- No Trigger
- Ninety Pound Wuss
- Piebald
- Braid

==== Saturday, September 23 ====
===== Baked Brothers Stage (Main) =====
- Becoming The Archetype
- High Vis
- Sparta
- Enter Shikari
- Saosin
- Thursday
- Head Automatica
- Turnstile

===== Plug Your Holes Stage (Shed) =====
- Foreign Hands
- Mindforce
- Zulu
- Drain
- Living Sacrifice
- Zao
- Training For Utopia
- Extol (Canceled)
- Terror
- Youth Of Today
- Gorilla Biscuits

===== Monster Energy Stage (Pond) =====
- Grand Champ
- Faülen
- Wielded Steel
- Teenage Wrist
- Gel
- MSPaint
- Militarie Gun
- Scowl
- HolyName
- Will Haven
- Trash Talk

==== Sunday, September 24 ====
===== Baked Brothers Stage (Main) =====
- Blessed By A Broken Heart
- Defeater
- Casey
- Better Lovers
- Between The Buried And Me
- Bouncing Souls
- Pennywise
- Bane

===== Plug Your Holes Stage (Shed) =====
- The Callous Daoboys
- Inclination
- Koyo
- One King Down
- Chasing Victory
- It Dies Today
- A Plea For Purging
- Strife
- Judge
- Prayer For Cleansing
- Haste The Day

===== Monster Energy Stage (Pond) =====
- Gutter
- Taking Meds
- Silly Goose
- Valleyheart
- Trenches
- The Insyderz
- Ghoti Hook
- As Cities Burn
- Further Seems Forever
- Mae
- Armor For Sleep

=== October 4 - 6, 2024 ===
==== Friday, October 4 ====
===== Heart Support Stage (Main) =====
- From A Second Story Window
- Dying Wish
- Oh, Sleeper
- Full Of Hell
- Silent Planet
- Haste The Day
- The Devil Wears Prada
- Silverstein
- August Burns Red

===== Arsenal Strength Stage (Shed) =====
- Twisted Luck
- Nygma
- 156/Silence
- Bury Your Dead
- Bleeding Through
- He Is Legend
- Emery
- Unearth
- Better Lovers
- Bane
- Coalesce

===== Monster Energy Stage(Pond) =====
- Double Tap
- Penny Circus
- Michael Cera Palin
- Slow Joy
- Saturdays At Your Place
- Oso Oso
- Glitterer
- Tiny Moving Parts
- Free Throw

==== Saturday, October 5 ====
===== Heart Support Stage(main) =====
- My Epic
- UnityTX
- The Fall Of Troy
- Hail The Sun
- L.S. Dunes
- Show Me the Body
- The Bled
- Saosin
- Coheed And Cambria

===== Arsenal Strength Stage(Shed) =====
- Commodity
- Idle Threat
- Evergreen Terrace
- Skycamefalling
- Misery Signals
- Shai Hulud
- Pain Of Truth
- Snapcase
- No Innocent Victim
- Stretch Arm Strong
- Poison The Well

===== Monster Energy Stage(Pond) =====
- Greyhaven
- Delta Hate
- Valley Of Doves
- Silent Drive
- Be Well
- Catch 22
- Noise Ratchet
- Slick Shoes
- Five Iron Frenzy

==== Sunday October 6 ====
===== Heart Support Stage(main) =====
- '68
- Static Dress
- Eighteen Visions
- Boys Night Out
- Extol
- Norma Jean
- Blindside
- Underoath

===== Arsenal Strength Stage(Shed) =====
- Cold Hard Steel
- Ends Of Sanity
- One Step Closer
- Magnitude
- The Showdown
- Mindforce
- Drug Church
- H2O
- Comeback Kid
- No Pressure
- Trapped Under Ice

===== Monster Energy Stage(Pond) =====
- All In
- Not Waving But Drowning
- Codeseven
- The Beautiful Mistake
- Dogwood
- Anxious
- The Juliana Theory
- The Early November
- Reggie And The Full Effect

=== October 3 - 5 2025 ===
==== Friday, October 3 ====
===== Main Stage =====
- Day Job
- Proper.
- Gideon
- Spanish Love Songs
- Knuckle Puck
- Microwave
- Hot Water Music
- Texas Is The Reason
- Saves the Day
- Mom Jeans
- Jimmy Eat World

===== Shed Stage =====
- Double Tap
- Contention
- Guilt Trip
- Sunami
- Pig Pen
- Madball
- Mindforce
- Speed (Australian band)
- Comeback Kid
- Drain
- Kublai Khan (band)

===== Pond Stage =====
- Decoy
- Adlet
- Wounded Touch
- Secret World
- I Am The Avalanche
- Midrift
- Novulent
- Delta Sleep
- Initiate
- Still Remains
- From First To Last

==== Saturday, October 4 ====
===== Main Stage =====
- Meadows
- Super Sometimes
- Keep Flying
- Millington
- Soft Play
- Stavesacre
- Anberlin
- Say Anything
- Less Than Jake
- Suicidal Tendencies
- Dropkick Murphys

===== Shed Stage =====
- Path of Destruction
- Crush Your Soul
- Big Ass Truck
- Orthodox
- Modern Life Is War
- Ten Yard Fight
- On Broken Wings
- Nora
- Living Sacrifice
- Zao
- Counterparts

===== Pond Stage =====
- Common Sage
- Squint
- Dosser
- As Cities Burn
- Bleach
- A Change Of Pace
- Driveways
- Rolo Tomassi
- Teen Suicide
- Glare
- Petey USA

==== Sunday October 5 ====
===== Main Stage =====
- My Reply
- Johnny Booth
- Boundaries
- Stray From The Path
- Horse The Band
- The Tony Danza Tap Dance Extravaganza
- Terror
- Norma Jean
- Converge
- The Dillinger Escape Plan
- Knocked Loose

===== Shed Stage =====
- Vigilante
- Balmora
- Martyr A.D.
- WeaponX
- Haywire
- Gridiron
- The Mongoloids
- Sanguisugabogg
- Harm's Way
- Biohazard (band)
- Foundation

===== Pond Stage =====
- Gumm
- Spaced
- Soul Blind
- Secret and Whisper
- Many Eyes
- Downward
- The Rocket Summer
- Sweet Pill
- Sincere Engineer
- Emery
- Citizen
