= Novulent =

- Born: June 6, 2004 (age 22); Dallas, Texas, U.S.
- Genres: Shoegaze; dream pop
- Occupations: Singer; songwriter; guitarist
- Instruments: Vocals; guitar; bass; violin; drums
- Years active: 2021–present
- Labels: The Royals; Capitol
- Website: novulentmusic.com

Novulent (born June 6, 2004) is an American musician, singer and songwriter from Dallas, Texas. They (Note: Novulent uses they/them pronouns.) first gained attention after their 2023 singles "Savior" and "Scars" both achieved viral success on TikTok, with the latter charting on the Billboard Hot Rock & Alternative Songs chart and being certified Gold by the Recording Industry Association of America (RIAA), after which they signed with Capitol Records in 2024.

== Life and career ==
Novulent was born on June 6, 2004, in Dallas, Texas, and spent their childhood moving around the Dallas area with their parents, who immigrated to the city from Zimbabwe shortly before their birth. At the age of nine, Novulent became interested in rock music after hearing the Deftones song "Change (In the House of Flies)" whilst watching Dragon Ball Z: Cooler’s Revenge. Novulent's father strictly prohibited rock music in their house for religious reasons, although he had become more lenient by the time of his death from a sudden illness, when Novulent was 13 years old. They started out playing violin, and initially aspired to become a tattoo artist before deciding to pursue music when they were 17. They initially named themselves Nova before renaming themselves Novulent, due to the former name being taken.

Novulent initially recorded songs on BandLab using an iPhone 6 after working at a gas station in the mornings and afternoons. Their debut single, "M.I.A", was released in 2022. In late 2023, their single "Savior" became popular on TikTok; Eli Enis of Stereogum described the song as being "paradigmatic 2023 shoegaze" for its association with the app. In March 2024, their 2023 single "Scars" went viral on TikTok after being used in a social media post by Megan Thee Stallion, and subsequently debuted at number 45 on the Billboard Hot Rock & Alternative Songs chart; its success led Novulent to drop out of college. In August 2025, the song was certified Gold by the Recording Industry Association of America (RIAA).

Based off their success on streaming platforms, Novulent signed with Capitol Records in 2024, releasing their debut EP through the label, Before Evolution, in January 2025. In April and May 2025, they released the singles "New Low" and "RIP" in anticipation of their major label debut, Vol. 3. In September and October, they performed at the Furnace Fest and toured with members of the Baltimore band The Missing Peace. By November, Novulent had scrapped 12 songs and begun working on Vol. 3 from scratch, as they felt its material was not up to par with their peers such as Wisp, Quannnic, and Midrift. On November 29, they held the inaugural edition of their rock festival, Novmas Fest, at Puzzles in Deep Ellum, Dallas. Vol. 3 was released on February 13, 2026. Novulent embarked on a headlining tour in support of the album from June 11 to August 8, 2026.

== Musical style and influences ==
I honestly don’t know how I'd describe [my sound] – I'm in love with so many styles of rock it bleeds into my music. Anytime I ask someone what genre they think I make, I get different answers.

— Novulent

Since the release of their 2023 single "Blinded", Novulent's output has showcased a shoegaze and dream pop sound that incorporates elements from alternative metal, nu metal, grunge, and slowcore. Matt Collar of AllMusic described the sound of their early output as "cloud rap-adjacent". Their songs incorporate sludgy, atmopsheric guitars and vocals, and lyrics Eric Snider of Creative Loafing Tampa described as "all but indistinguishable". Sean Stroud of the Dallas Observer also noted their general brevity and lack of repetition. Novulent has cited Deftones as their favorite band, and the Whirr album Feels Like You (2019) as a significant influence on shaping their music. They have also cited Sleeping with Sirens, Olivia Lufkin, Plastic Tree, and the soundtrack of Persona 5 (2016), their favorite video game, as influences.

== Discography ==
=== Studio albums ===
List of studio albums, with selected details
Title	Album details
My Story	Released: June 20, 2022; Label: The Royals; Format: DD
My Story 2	Released: May 1, 2023; Label: The Royals; Format: DD
Vol. 1	Released: October 14, 2023; Label: The Royals; Format: LP, DD
Dear Diary	Released: January 24, 2024; Label: The Royals; Format: DD
Vol. 2	Released: August 24, 2024; Label: The Royals; Format: DD
Vol. 3	Released: February 13, 2026; Label: Capitol; Format: LP, DD

=== Extended plays ===
List of EPs, with selected details
Title	EP details
Untold Story	Released: July 8, 2023; Label: The Royals; Format: DD
Secret Letters	Released: March 29, 2024; Label: The Royals; Format: DD
Before Evolution	Released: January 24, 2025; Label: Capitol; Format: DD

=== Singles ===
Title	Year	Peak chart positions	Certifications	Album
Title	Year	US Hot Rock	Certifications	Album
"M.I.A"	2022	—		My Story
"Happier"	2022	—		My Story
"Call Me"	2022	—		My Story
"Love Story"	2022	—		Non-album single
"Forgotten" (feat. Synnr+)	2022	—		My Story
"Reject"	2022	—		Non-album singles
"Drowning"	2022	—		Non-album singles
"I Know"	2022	—		Non-album singles
"Love Me"	2022	—		Non-album singles
"Swept Away" (feat. Overpade)	2022	—		Non-album singles
"Fall"	2022	—		Non-album singles
"Like Its Summer" (feat. Synnr+)	2022	—		Non-album singles
"It Hurts"	2022	—		Non-album singles
"Blinded"	2023	—		My Story 2
"Ocean Eyes"	2023	—		Non-album single
"Always Been You"	2023	—		My Story 2
"Stay"	2023	—		My Story 2
"Unknown Feelings"	2023	—		Non-album singles
"Entry1"	2023	—		Non-album singles
"Scars"	2023	45	RIAA: Gold	Vol. 1
"Eternal Life"	2023	—		Untold Story
"Savior"	2023	—		Vol. 1
"Fall" (feat. 8Kaila)	2023	—		Non-album single
"Cold Skin"	2023	—		Vol. 1
"Fallen Angel"	2023	—		Untold Story
"Enchanting"	2023	—		Vol. 1
"Intact"	2023	—		Dear Diary
"Suicide Note"	2023	—		Dear Diary
"Overwhelming"	2024	—		Secret Letters
"Soul Ties"	2024	—		Vol. 2
"New Low"	2025	—		Non-album singles
"RIP"	2025	—		Non-album singles
"Evil Eye"	2025	—		Vol. 3
"Sacrifice"	2025	—		Vol. 3
"Boys Lie and Girls Steal"	2025	—		Vol. 3
"—" denotes a recording that did not chart or was not released in that territory.

=== Music videos ===
- "Scars" (2023)
- "Deathwish" (2025)
