= Across Five Aprils (band) =

American post-hardcore band

- Origin: Chattanooga, Tennessee, U.S.
- Genres: Post-hardcore, metalcore
- Years active: 2001–2008, 2012, 2021-present
- Labels: Victory, Indianola
- Members: Brandon Mullins; Drew Miller; Jason Barry; Zak Towe; Jason Fields
- Past members: Steve Wooteon; Jarrod Smith; Josh Dycus; Steve Taylor; Adam Nordmeyer

Across Five Aprils (often shortened to A5A) is a post-hardcore band from Chattanooga, Tennessee. The band started in September 2001 and were signed to Victory Records. Their name was borrowed from the Irene Hunt novel of the same name about the American Civil War. The band broke up in late 2008 and then got back together in 2021.

== History ==
=== Formation, A Tragedy in Progress and Collapse (2001–2007) ===
The band released its first album, A Tragedy in Progress, in May 2003 on Indianola Records. Following the success of this release, they played shows with bands such as Underoath, My Chemical Romance, Norma Jean, Haste the Day, Atreyu and It Dies Today. Not long after the release, original guitarist Jason Fields departed the band.

After some member changes, the band wrote and recorded their second release on Indianola, an EP entitled Living in the Moment. The EP is the band's last release with founding members Taylor and Barry, and is the first release with guitarist Jarrod Smith who replaced Jason Fields, who departed the band in 2003 after the release of their debut album A Tragedy in Progress. Like their first album, the EP was also recorded at XadeX Studios with producer John Taylor. In reviews of the EP, the band has been compared to many diverse bands, such as Atreyu, Thrice, Scatter the Ashes, Coalesce and Converge.

They toured the United States several times with bands such as The Banner, and then proceeded to write their second full-length release, Collapse. Following the release of this album, the band went back on the road full-time and in July 2007, the band was picked up by Victory Records. At this point, Drew Miller has also departed the band, leaving Zak Towe the only original founding member in the band. Before entering the studio to record their third album, guitarist Jarrod Smith has also left the band, and was replaced by Adam Nordmeyer.

=== Life Underwater and frequent line-up changes (2007–2008) ===
Across Five Aprils released their Victory Records debut album, Life Underwater, on February 19, 2008. The album was recorded by producer Matt Goldman from Glow in the Dark Studios in Atlanta, Georgia.

=== Break up (2008) ===
On September 22, 2008, Across Five Aprils announced that they would be breaking up. They had a very short farewell tour in October and had their final farewell show in Chattanooga, TN on November 1, 2008.

=== Reunion and A Tragedy in Progress (2010) ===
On October 14, 2010, the original line-up of Across Five Aprils announced two reunion shows in Chattanooga, Tennessee and Marietta, Georgia. The band used the moniker A Tragedy in Progress as an homage from the debut album out of respect to the members that came after them, and decided not to use the original band name. They released a four-song EP titled Going Down with the Ship on January 25, 2011, on their original label Indianola Records. The EP included a re-recording of the song "Around the World in a Radio Flyer" (titled only "Radio Flyer") from their debut album.

On September 9, 2011, the band announced that they would be entering the studio in December 2011 to record an album to be released on Indianola Records in early 2012. On September 15, 2011, it was confirmed that the album would be recorded at Echelon Studios where the band recorded their latest EP along with producer Joseph McQueen. Guitarist Jason Fields has also commented on the upcoming album: "The new record I think will be deeper, both lyrically and musically". On May 11, 2012, the first single off the new album, "The Human Condition", was released for free streaming. The album Mechanical Weather was announced for release on August 28, 2012, on Indianola Records.

=== Reunions (2012, 2021) ===
On March 31, 2012, the band played a one-off reunion show in Pensacola, Florida. The first reunion show of the band under that name, as the 2010 shows were performed by the band under A Tragedy in Progress, which became a new band. The band members performing were not the original line-up but instead the line-up of the band's second album Collapse, unlike the 2010 reunion which focused on the Tragedy in Progress line-up. The line-up included Drew Miller and Zak Towe (from A Tragedy in Progress), Brandon Mullins, Jarrod Smith and Josh Dycus. In 2021, Across Five Aprils reunited once again to play at that year's Furnace Fest. They ended up still continue to play shows together.

== Band members ==
Current members

- Brandon Mullins - lead vocals (2004–2008, 2021–present)
- Drew Miller - drums, percussion (2001–2007, 2021–present)
- Jason Barry - bass (2001–2004, 2021–present)
- Zak Towe - guitar (2001–2008, 2021–present)
- Jason Fields - guitar, vocals (2001–2003, 2021–present)

Former members

- Steve Wooteon - drums, percussion (2007–2008)
- Jarrod Smith - guitar (2003–2007)
- Steve Taylor - lead vocals (2002–2004)
- Josh Dycus - bass (2004–2008)
- Adam Nordmeyer - guitar (2007–2008)

Timeline

== Discography ==
=== Studio albums ===
- A Tragedy in Progress, May 20, 2003 - Indianola
- Collapse, July 11, 2006 - Indianola
- Life Underwater, February 19, 2008 - Victory

=== EPs ===
- Twenty-Three Minutes and Thirty-Four Seconds of Scenic City Rock N' Roll, March 2002
- Self-Titled EP, October 2002
- Living in the Moment, September 14, 2004 - Indianola Records
