= Sunny Singh (filmographer) =

American filmographer, programmer and music archivist

- Born: Sandeep Singh; April 3, 1986 (age 40); Marlton, New Jersey, U.S.
- Other name: Hate5six
- Occupations: Filmographer; programmer; music archivist
- Years active: 2000–present

YouTube information
- Channel: hate5six
- Years active: 2011–present
- Genre: Music
- Subscribers: 378 thousand
- Views: 112 million
- Last updated: 13 April 2026
- Website: hate5six.com

Sandeep "Sunny" Singh (born April 3, 1986) is an American filmographer, programmer and music archivist, who primarily records and uploads footage of hardcore punk performances under the name hate5six. Triple J referred to him as "the internet’s hardest working hardcore videographer". In a December 2019 article for Billboard, writer Eli Enis referred to the accessibility of his content as "the biggest factor" for the popularity of hardcore in the late-2010s.

Singh also often releases footage of spoken word performances, interviews, and protests and political speeches, providing a platform for support of causes such as indigenous rights and anarchism.

== Biography ==
Singh grew up in Marlton, New Jersey. His parents emigrated from India in the 1970s, which led to them being one of the only non-white families in the town. In the 1990s, he gained an interest in music through his older brother being a fan of musicians like Jimi Hendrix, James Brown, Ace of Base, Soundgarden, Rage Against the Machine. In particular, Rage Against the Machine led him to listening to hardcore through vocalist Zack de la Rocha's previous band Inside Out.

He began online tape trading in the late-1990s through uploading a copy of Rage Against the Machine performing at the Dragonfly in California in April 1996, which he had bought at a stall in Moorestown Mall.

In 2000, Singh began recording footage of performances by local South Jersey bands, however by mid-2004, he had stopped due to beginning college. (Singh attended Haverford College and majored in mathematics. His senior thesis was on continued fractions.)

In 2006, he recommenced filming after buying a Canon GL2, and began filming more well known bands, such as Floorpunch. Singh began the website Hate5six.com in 2008 as a way of hosting his footage. The name "hate5six" was a reference to the 856 area code of Marlton. In 2009, he filmed Burning Fight festival in Chicago, which saw the reformation of many 1990s metalcore acts such as Disembodied, Trial, 108 and Unbroken.

In 2011, he released his first DVD, titled The Hate5six Diaries: Volume One, a live compilation that featured performances by groups such as Converge, Damnation A.D., Have Heart, Kid Dynamite and Touché Amoré. The proceeds from the release were donated to the charity One Hundred For Haiti, in support of Haiti citizens negatively affected by its 2010 earthquake.

In March 2018, Singh departed from his full-time job and began doing his videography and archiving full-time.

On March 14, 2020, Singh recorded Code Orange performing at the release show for their album Underneath, which was closed to the public due to the COVID-19 pandemic. When livestreamed, the performance gained over 13,000 viewers. On March 20, 2020, he also livestreamed Year of the Knife performing, who were set to tour with Code Orange on the cancelled tour.

== Website ==
Singh has described Hate5six.com as a "democratic, community-controlled system", by having viewers vote for what video will be uploaded through Patreon. Patrons also vote for charities that 8.56% of the proceeds go to.

In 2017, Singh expanded the website to include SAGE (Sage Analyzes Graph Embeddings), an artificial intelligence system that recommends bands based on listening patterns.

== Equipment ==
When Singh first began professionally filming in 2006, he used a Canon GL2 camcorder. In 2014, he designed and created his own skycam, which is controlled by an Xbox controller. However, some events such as This is Hardcore Festival have banned him from using it. In a 2015 interview with No Echo, Singh stated that he used a "Canon XF100 [camera] and a Zoom H4N audio recorder".

== Politics ==
Singh identifies as an anti-capitalist and anti-fascist. Hate5six's logo is a take on the hammer and sickle, a common form of communist iconography. He has outspokenly supported transgender rights and Black Lives Matter. He has cited his favourite biography as being that of civil rights activist Malcolm X.

He follows both a straight edge and vegan lifestyle.

The proceeds from his 2011 film The Hate5six Diaries: Volume One were donated to the charity One Hundred For Haiti, in support of Haiti citizens negatively affected by its 2010 earthquake.

In June 2020, Singh's first-hand footage of Philadelphia police tear gassing peaceful protesters on I-676 during the George Floyd protests was cited by The New York Times, resulting in an apology from the city.

In February 2024, Singh’s Instagram account was suspended after months of posting in support Palestinian liberation. His account was restored just over a week later, and in a post made about the suspension, he said that it was “immaterial” compared to what Palestinians are facing.

== Select filmography ==
- The Hate5six Diaries: Volume One (2011)
