= The Great American Beast =

US musical group

- Also known as: The Red Affair (2002–2007)
- Origin: Dayton, Ohio, U.S.
- Genres: Southern rock, hardcore punk, metalcore
- Years active: 2002–2010
- Labels: Trustkill
- Members: Nick Villars; Jesse Blair; Peter Disalvo; Tim Baker; Andy Lazier
- Past members: Levi Walden; Benjamin Salmen; Justin Netherly; Brandon Hawk; Kipp Adams
- Website: The Great American Beast - Myspace

The Great American Beast (formerly known as The Red Affair) was an American Southern rock/metalcore band from Dayton, Ohio. The group disbanded in 2010 to focus on other pursuits.

== History ==
=== Formation and early releases (2002-2007) ===
Formed in 2002 as The Red Affair, the band's original line-up consisted of several members from A Day in the Life, an alternative rock band from the same home city. The Red Affair went on hiatus a year later, and reformed in 2004 to record the EP Memento Mori. The Red Affair was featured on the three-way split EP with A Day in the Life and Hit the Lights entitled, From Ohio With Love.

After the departure of Justin Netherly, guitarist Levi Walden took over on vocals, with three other members (Peter, Ben, and Kipp) also joining the band. In late 2007 the band played their last show as The Red Affair, prior to changing their name to The Great American Beast.

Along with a new name, the band took on a new musical style. Previously The Red Affair was known as a softer band, representative of genres such as pop punk, emo, and post-hardcore. The Great American Beast, however, resembles modern metalcore and Southern rock.

=== Domestic Blood and break-up (2007-2010) ===
In late 2009 the band was signed with Trustkill Records. In September 2010 the group released their debut full-length album, entitled Domestic Blood. A digital EP entitled The Modern Gentlemen was released prior to the album, on June 22, 2010. Both works were released through Trustkill Records.

As of October 2010, bass guitarist Peter Disalvo announced via Myspace that the band had broken up and decided to "return to the real world." A final show was performed on October 23, 2010 at Sidney Elk's Lodge in Sidney, Ohio.
