= Uphill Battle =

US musical group

- Origin: Santa Barbara, California, United States
- Genres: Metalcore, Grindcore
- Years active: 1999–2005
- Labels: Relapse Records
- Past members: Adi Tejada; Danny Walker; Jeff Capra; Casey Shropshire; Wes Caley; Joe Gonzalez; Jehf Jones; Graham Clise
- Website: Official website

Uphill Battle was an American metalcore band with elements of grindcore, based out of Santa Barbara, California, United States.

== History ==
Uphill Battle got some recognition releasing their self-titled record on Relapse Records. Combining grindcores speed with a hardcore sense of tension, Uphill Battle's hectic riffing, strafing percussive assault and tortured vocals bled conviction and proved the band to be one of the scene's brightest hopefuls. A tour slot as part of the 2003 Relapse Records Contamination Tour alongside label-mates Mastodon, Cephalic Carnage and Dysrhythmia immediately followed, exposing the band to entirely new audiences.

Uphill Battle released their second full-length, Wreck of Nerves in 2004. In 2005, Uphill Battle disbanded, leaving behind Blurred, a collection of their pre-Relapse rarities including demo and compilation tracks.

== Members ==
- Adi Tejada - Guitars, lead vocals
- Danny Walker - Drums
- Jeff Capra - Guitars
- Casey Shropshire - Bass and vocals

== Discography ==
=== Albums ===
- Uphill Battle - (2002)
- Wreck of Nerves - (2004)

=== Compilation albums ===
- Blurred - (2006)

== Related bands ==
- Intronaut - Drummer Danny Walker's band
- Sutratma - Singer/Guitarist Adi Tejada's band
- Rival Cults - Guitar/Lead Vocals Adi Tejada's and Bass/Vocals Casey Shropshire's band
