= Maharahj =

Canadian musical group

- Origin: Oakville, Ontario, Canada
- Genres: Metalcore, chaotic hardcore
- Years active: 1997–2002
- Labels: Nowornever Records
- Members: Clayton Kelly; Colin Ross; Garren Ustel; Dave Johnston; Andrew Bricker
- Past members: Neil Boshart; John Brown
- Website: Maharahj Bandcamp page

Maharahj was a metalcore band from Oakville, Ontario. Their name originated from a modified spelling of the East Indian term maharaja. This now defunct band was founded in 1997 by Garren Ustel and Clayton Kelly under the original name One Winged Angel. Over the course five years, the band released one demo and two full length studio albums. After heated discussion about the viability of full-time tour support, they disbanded in 2002. Members went on to start bands Explode the Airwaves and Silverstein.

== History ==
During their first US tour, label owner Matt Beckerman signed Maharahj to his (now defunct) nowornever records. Sharing the stage with such label-mates as The Dillinger Escape Plan and Diecast, Maharahj found underground scene success with their blend of discordance and mathematical technicality. The studio recording full length Chapter One, The Descent embodied the bands raw talent, angst and grit. With a major label financial backing the record, Maharahj was able to gain a respectable fan base amidst a growing 1990s metalcore scene. Regardless, the rigorous demands of the touring, egos and difficult musicianship had their toll on some of the members.

In 2001, the heavy-handed nature of the band's internal songwriting process created some dramatic lineup changes. Colin and Andrew were recruited to replace Jon and Neil. Neil went on to join and play in the successful band Silverstein. Progressing as a more diverse band with varying musical interests, Maharahj recorded the sophomore effort Repetition. Despite the earnest effort, the album was not as well received as they had hoped. It received a two-star rating from AllMusic. Poor tour support and differing egos was also a contributing factor. One year later, the band split ways.

== Major label signing ==
Maharahj signed to Nowornever Records in June 1999. The band recorded both their full-length debut CD Chapter One, The Descent and sophomore effort Repetition on the Nowornever label at Signal to Noise studios in Toronto, Ontario.

== Members ==
- Vocals - Garren Ustel
- Guitar - Colin Ross
- Guitar - Clayton Kelly
- Bass - Andrew Bricker
- Drums - Dave Johnston

== Former members ==
- Guitar - Neil Boshart

== Discography ==
- A Replication of a Process and Product (EP) (September 1999)
- Chapter One, The Descent (LP) (August 2000)
- Repetition (LP) (September 2001)

== See also ==
- List of bands from Canada
- Silverstein (band)
