= On the Might of Princes =

- Origin: Long Island, New York, United States
- Genres: Post-hardcore, punk rock, screamo, emo
- Years active: 1998–2004
- Labels: Rok Lok, Revelation, Creep, Traffic Violation

On the Might of Princes are an American post-hardcore band from Long Island, New York.

== History ==
=== 1997–2004 ===
On the Might of Princes formed on Long Island, New York in 1997, emerging from an heterogeneous but cooperative community of independent bands and labels. First releasing material on Rok Lok (The Making of a Conversation) and Creep Records/Traffic Violation Records (Where You Are and Where You Want to Be), they eventually signed to Revelation records and released what would be their third and final record, Sirens, in 2003. After a follow-up tour of Europe, On the Might of Princes disbanded in May 2004.

=== 2006–2013 ===
After a two-year split, they reunited in late 2006 to play three shows in Connecticut, Long Island, NY and Brooklyn, NY. Soon afterward, expanded re-releases of their first two albums, The Making of a Conversation and Where You Are and Where You Want to Be were released on Rok Lok Records in January 2007.

In August 2008, they temporarily reunited once again for a show at Knitting Factory in New York, NY.

In 2012, Revelation Records announced that the group would reunite yet again for the label's 25th anniversary festival at Irving Plaza.

A fourth reunion was planned for June 2013, but was cancelled for undisclosed reasons. Soon after, the band formally declared that there would be no more shows or new material and they had officially broken up.

Jason Rosenthal passed away in Austin, Texas of a heart attack on August 12, 2013. He was 35.

=== 2020–present ===
In 2020, the bands sophomore album, Where you Are and Where You Want to Be turned twenty and was remastered and re-released by Dead Broke Rekerds with additional bonus tracks not featured on the original release. Shortly thereafter, drummer Chris Enriquez started a GoFundMe to make a documentary about the band entitled Hold On to a Time (taken from a line in "The Water vs. the Anchor"). The film premiered September 28, 2023 to a sold out audience at Nitehawk Cinema in Brooklyn, NY.

In 2023, the bands third and final album Sirens turned twenty and was remixed, remastered and re-released by Dead Broke Rekerds in partnership with Revelation Records, who originally released the album in 2003. The band celebrated its twenty year anniversary as well as the life of Jason Rosenthal at the ten year mark of his passing with a string of shows in New York at The Brooklyn Monarch on September 29, 2023, Amityville Music Hall on September 30, 2023 and Saint Vitus Bar on October 1, 2023. The shows featured Nicole Keiper Childrey (drums on select tracks), Chris Enriquez (drums), Lou Fontana (guitar/vocals) and Tommy Orza (bass) and marked the debut of current vocalist, Rachel Rubino (Open City, Bridge & Tunnel, Each Other’s Mothers, Con Amore and Regarding I), guitarist, Tom Tierney (Julie Christmas, Tidal Arms) and keyboardist, Justin Williams (Bearchild, Judas Knife, Light Tower, Effective Relief, Gracer and Lux Curagrous). It is unclear whether the band will continue to do more in the future.

On August 2nd, 2025, the group performed as part of New Friends Fest DIY of which the band stated during their performance that it was likely their first show they have played in Canada.

On the Might of Princes is scheduled to play at Collective Effort Fest in New York City in October 2026.

== Band members ==
- Chris Enriquez – drums
- Lou Fontana – guitar, vocals
- Tom Orza – bass, vocals
- Rachel Rubino – vocals
- Tom Tierney – guitar, vocals
- Justin Williams – keys, vocals

== Former members ==
- Nicole Keiper – Drums (1997–1999)
- Jason Rosenthal – Vocals, Guitar (1997–2004, 2006–2007, 2012–2013)

== Post On the Might of Princes projects ==
Jason Rosenthal went on to sing and play guitar in the Brass from 2007 to 2010. Vehicles, a project consisting of Rosenthal, Ellis, Rich Buckley (ex-Shapes) and Rob "Wiz" Wisely (ex-Blakfish) was roughly recorded but shelved. Following Rosenthal's death in August 2013, Tom Tierney (Tidal Arms, Julie Christmas) collaborated with the remaining members to complete the material. As of 2015 it remained unreleased. Rosenthal was also involved in a band called Oscenita with his girlfriend, Emily Ruf and collaborated with the Saddest Landscape on a few tracks, some released and some unreleased.

Chris Enriquez is the drummer for Spotlights (Ipecac Recordings) and Julie Christmas. He is also the lead singer/guitarist for Light Tower (Iodine Recordings), bassist for Judas Knife (Iodine Recordings) and guitarist for Total Meltdown. Enriquez previously played drums in Primitive Weapons (Party Smasher Inc.), Gracer (Revelation Records), Villa Vina and HAAN (Aqualamb Records.) Additionally, Enriquez performed as the live drummer for Criteria (Saddle Creek Records), Shai Hulud, Supertouch (Revelation Records), Beyond and many more.

Tommy Orza has a solo project called King Weapon. He also played in Aux Era, Mont Gomery, Villa Vina, Limbs and Judas Knife.

Lou Fontana had a solo project entitled God’s Gift to Women and played guitar in Small Arms Dealer (Deep Elm Records), Fellow Project and Go White Bronco (86'd Records). Fontana briefly played bass in With Every Idle Hour.

== Discography ==
Studio albums

- The Making of a Conversation (Rok Lok Records, released August 1999)
- Where You Are and Where You Want to Be (Creep Records & Traffic Violation Records, released 2001)
- Sirens (Revelation Records, released September 2003)
