= Kids Like Us =

American hardcore punk band

Kids Like Us is an American hardcore punk band from north Florida. Formed in 2003, the band drew influences from various subgenres of punk prominent in the scene at the time such as DIY, Garage, and Skate. Known for their over-the-top lyrical vulgarity and aggression, most of the songs they wrote and performed were casual in theme, often relating to skateboarding, eating burritos, straightedge lifestyle, and drinking Coca-Cola. They released three full-length albums and two split albums, and toured with bands such as Down To Nothing, Casey Jones, and the Mongoloids.

== History ==
Kids Like Us was formed by Lars Lundquist and Brandon Hurst after the break up of xOne Fifthx. They were soon joined by guitarist Clint Penick and released a 5-song demo. Later that year, Kids Like Us signed to Knife or Death Records and released a self-titled full length. In 2004, Kids Like Us signed to Eulogy Recordings and released their second full length, Outta Control with the majority of songs written by guitarist Stephen Krantz. After several member changes, the band released their final full length, The Game, and a split with label-mates the Mongoloids.
