= Disembodied (band) =

American metalcore band

- Origin: Minneapolis, Minnesota, U.S.
- Genres: Metalcore
- Years active: 1995–1999, 2008–2011, 2018–present
- Labels: Ferret, Trustkill, Edison, Good Fight, Undecided, Prime Directive, FurFace, Moo Cow
- Spinoffs: Martyr A.D.
- Members: Tara Johnson; Joel Andrew Johnson; Morgan Carpenter; Mike Olender; Mike Paradise
- Past members: Aaron Weseman; Charlie "Chazmo" Johnson; Justin James Kane; Mario Diaz de León; Mark Wilcox; Tony "Tubes" Byron; Joel Andersen

Disembodied is an American metalcore band formed in 1995 in Minneapolis. Originally featuring Aaron Weseman (vocals), Justin James Kane (drums), Tara Johnson (bass), Joel Andrew Johnson (guitar), and Mario Diaz de León (guitar), the band split up in 1999 and reunited in 2008 and 2018, respectively.

== History ==
In 1995, Disembodied released their debut EP, Existence in Suicide, through Furface Records, which was accompanied by the debut single "The Confession" in the following year. The band signed to Ferret Music prior to releasing their full-length debut album, Diablerie, in 1997. The band subsequently embarked on a North American tour to promote their 1998 EP If God Only Knew the Rest Were Dead.

Disembodied's final releases before the split-up were a split release with Brother's Keeper and the studio album Heretic, both released in 1999. The band also recorded a cover of Metallica's "Creeping Death", originally scheduled to be released on a split 7-inch vinyl titled Crush 'Em All through Undecided Records. After the split fell through, the song appeared on the Undecided Records various artists compilation The Old, the New, the Unreleased in 2005 and was later included on the Psalms of Sheol compilation. The band also posthumously appeared on the various artists compilation It's All About the Money, co-released by Surprise Attack Records, Goodfellow Records and Redstar Records.

Following the split-up, bassist Tara Johnson (née Anderson) and her husband Joel Andrew Johnson formed the metalcore band Martyr A.D. Drummer Joel Andersen formed the band Devilinside with guitarist Tony 'Tubes' Byron.

Disembodied reunited in 2008, after Brian Peterson, the author of Burning Fight, brought the band members together for an interview for his book. The band was also joined by Martyr A.D. guitarist Charlie "Chazma" Johnson. Releasing the compilation and rarities album Psalms of Sheol in 2009, the band extensively toured in the following year. In 2010, bassist Johnson stated that the band had not started writing new material yet, although they had enough riffs to build songs from. The band played their last show in June 2011, but reunited in 2017 for that year's This is Hardcore Fest. In November 2019, Good Fight Music released Transfiguration, a discography compilation which compiled the band's two full-lengths as well as the If God Only Knew the Rest Were Dead EP and the band's tracks from their Oxymoron split with Brother's Keeper.

On July 6th, 2025 the band will once again reunite to play the Hellphyra Fest in East Rutherford, NJ. Mike Olender (Burnt By The Sun, Endeavor, For The Love Of...) will be performing vocal duties for their set.

== Band members ==
- Mike Paradise – drums (2008–2011, 2018–present)
- Tara Johnson – bass (1995–1999, 2008–2011, 2018–present)
- Joel Johnson – guitar (1995–1997, 2008–2011, 2018–present)
- Morgan Carpenter – guitar (2025–present)
- Mike Olender – vocals (2025-present)

Former members

- Aaron Weseman – vocals (1995–1999, 2008–2011, 2018–2025)
- Charlie "Chazmo" Johnson – guitar (2008–2011, 2018)
- Justin Kane – drums (1995–1997)
- Mark Wilcox – guitar (1995–1996)
- Mario Diaz de León – guitar (1996)
- Tony 'Tubes' Byron – guitar (1997–1999)
- Joel Andersen – drums (1997–1999)

Timeline
| Existence in Suicide (1995) | The Confession (1996) | Diablerie (1997) | If God Only Knew the Rest Were Dead (1998) | Heretic (1999) | Oxymoron w/Brother's Keeper (1999) | Psalms of Sheol (2009) | Transfiguration (2019) |
|---|---|---|---|---|---|---|---|
Aaron Weseman
Joel Johnson
Tara Johnson
| Mark Wilcox | Mario Diaz de León | Tony Tubes Byron | | | | Charlie "Chazmo" Johnson | |
| Justin Kane | | Justin Kane (96-97) / Joel Andersen (97-99) | | | | Mike Paradise | |

Timeline

== Discography ==
Studio albums

- Diablerie (1997, Ferret)
- Heretic (1999, Edison)

EPs

- Existence in Suicide (1995, FurFace)
- If God Only Knew the Rest Were Dead (1998, Ferret)

Splits

- Oxymoron with Brother's Keeper (1999, Trustkill)

Singles

- "The Confession" (1996, Moo Cow)

Compilations

- Psalms of Sheol (2009, Prime Directive)
- Transfiguration (2019, Good Fight Music)
