= Nora (band) =

American hardcore punk band

- Origin: Highland Park, New Jersey, United States
- Genres: Metalcore
- Years active: 1996–present
- Labels: Ferret, Trustkill Records, Good Fight Recordings
- Members: Carl Severson Matt "Portland" Hay Steve "Jeff" Chladnicek Dan Hornecker Chris Ross
- Website: http://www.myspace.com/nora

Nora is an American metalcore band from Highland Park, New Jersey. The band took its name from Nora Diniro, a character from the film Pump Up the Volume.

Nora's members began playing together in 1996, and their first release was the Kill You For A Dollar EP followed soon after by a split CDEP with the Dillinger Escape Plan on Ferret Records. The band then moved over to Trustkill Records in 1999 and issued another EP, called Neverendingyouline. Following this EP, Mike Olender and John Kohler left to pursue Burnt By The Sun and Ex Number Five, and the band moved forward with Matt "Portland" Hay and Matt "Frenchie" Haick filling the guitar spots. Poison the Well guitarist Ryan Primack also filled in for the band's performance at Hellfest in 2000.

The band released their first album, Losers' Intuition in 2001. Following the departure of Matt Haick, who left to pursue his other project Merciana, and original bassist Spliedt during 2002, the lineup of Severson, Hay (guitar), Ross (drums) welcomed new bassist Tim Cuccolo (ex-Ex Number Five) and Chris Byrnes (guitar) and released Dreamers & Deadmen in 2003. Cuccolo later left and with Byrnes moving over to bass, second guitarist Steve "Steve Jeff" Chladnicek joined on in early 2004. The following year, Byrnes exited to go join Every Time I Die, and former Nora guitarist/Burnt by the Sun vocalist Mike Olender came back in his place. Nora entered the studio in early 2007 to record and release Save Yourself, and went dormant soon after until 2015.

Vocalist Carl Severson was owner of hardcore record label Ferret Music but has since moved on to start Good Fight Entertainment since the Warner Bros buy out of Ferret.

Carl Severson and Mike Olender attended high school with Trustkill owner and president Josh Grabelle.

== Band members ==
- Carl Severson (vocals) 1996–present
- Matt "Portland" Hay (guitar) 2001–present
- Steve "Jeff" Chladnicek (guitar) 2004–present
- Chris Ross (drums) 1996–present
- Dan Hornecker (bass) 2015–present

== Past members ==
- Mike Olender (bass) 1996–1999, 2006–2009
- Matt Haick (guitar) 1996–2002
- C.R. Spliedt (bass) 1996–2002
- Ryan Primack (guitar) 2000
- Chris Byrnes (bass/guitar) 2002–2005, (bass) 2018
- John Kohler (guitar) 1996–1999
- Tim Cuccolo (bass) 2002–2005

== Discography ==
- Theneverendingyouline EP (1999)
- Kill You for a Dollar EP (1999)
- Split EP with The Dillinger Escape Plan (1998)
- Loser's Intuition (2001)
- Dreamers & Deadmen (2003)
- Save Yourself (2007)
