= Most Precious Blood (band) =

American punk band

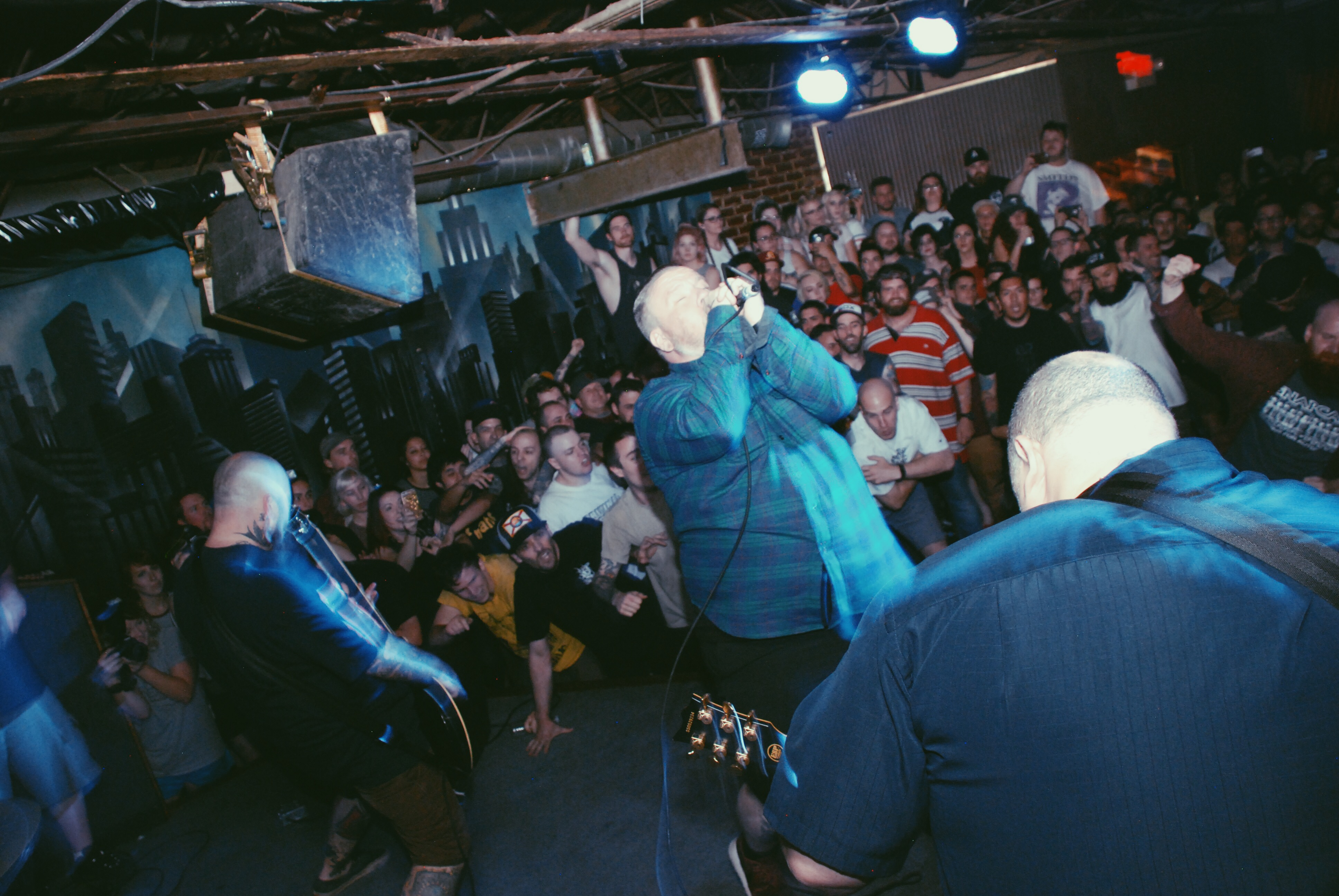
- Most Precious Blood in 2016

Background information
- Origin: New York City, U.S.
- Genres: Hardcore punk, metalcore
- Years active: 2001–present
- Labels: Bullet Tooth
- Members: Justin Brannan; Rachel Rosen; Rob Fusco; Matt Miller; Colin Kercz; Thomas Sheehan

Most Precious Blood is an American hardcore punk band from New York City formed from the remnants of the band Indecision. They blend the song structures of hardcore with heavy metal, and the band cites Sick of It All, Aphex Twin, The Sisters of Mercy, and The Obsessed as influences, among others. They were signed to Trustkill Records until it dissolved in 2010. They are now with Trustkill president Josh Grabelle's new label Bullet Tooth.

The band and its members advocated the straight edge movement, animal rights, vegetarianism and veganism. As of 2015, vocalist Rob Fusco is no longer. However, they deny being preachy in any way, saying "I'm not going around trying to change people because people are going to change when they want to... if I said something that you found truth in, or that you found made sense, cool – I'm glad I was a catalyst to help you come to your own conclusions."

== History ==
Originally, the band featured former Indecision guitarists Justin Brannan and Rachel Rosen, as well as on-again off-again Indecision vocalist Tom Sheehan. On their debut full-length for Trustkill Records, Nothing in Vain (2001), Brannan played guitar, Rosen played bass, and Sheehan did vocals.

Nothing in Vain was recorded in a 9' x 15' one room studio in an abandoned building near Sailors Snug Harbor, Staten Island. The building was once an old age home for sick and dying wayward sailors. There were odd noises that ended up on the master tapes that the band never recalled hearing during the recording. The album was engineered and produced by long-time Indecision producer Ron Thal, who would later go on to play guitar for Guns N' Roses.

Original Indecision drummer Pat Flynn played drums on Nothing in Vain but left the group immediately following the completion of the record. Flynn walked out of the studio once he finished his drums tracks.

The band then recruited Sean McCann. He would stay with the group for several years and would play on 2003's Our Lady of Annihilation. McCann then left the band in the middle of the night before the band was set to fly to Arizona for a gig. When the band woke up, McCann was nowhere to be found; a Dear John letter was left behind underneath the wiper blade of the band's van parked outside. The band still boarded the plane and flew down to Arizona without a drummer. The band met up with the drummer from Where Eagles Dare, a hardcore punk outfit from Arizona; he played with the band at their Arizona show, learning the songs the night before.

In 2003, after Sheehan departed the band to return to school, the band teamed up with former One King Down vocalist Rob Fusco, added Matt Miller on bass, and moved Rosen to second guitar for their second album Our Lady of Annihilation. Surprise hits "The Great Red Shift" and "Your Picture Hung Itself" launched the band's profile. The album also features a guest appearance from Sick of It All's Lou Koller.

MPB contributed a cover of "Sweet Child Of Mine" to Bring You to Your Knees: A Tribute to Guns N' Roses, a cover of "Rise Above" to Black on Black: A Tribute to Black Flag, and a cover of "Alone" to Our Impact Will Be Felt: A Tribute to Sick of It All with Paul Klein (A Lifeless Alliance, Gotham Road, The Banner) filling in on drums.

MPB was the first American Hardcore band to tour South Africa. They have also been to 50+ countries, including most of Europe, as well as Brazil, Australia, New Zealand, and all over the U.S., Canada, and Puerto Rico.

Rachel Rosen and Justin Brannan appeared in minor roles in Threat, an independent film produced in the NYHC scene.

MPB has had 13 drummers over the history of the band. Sean McCann (2001–2003) and Colin Kercz (2004–present) are the longest serving.

=== Recent activity ===
The band has denied rumors of a breakup, claiming they have just been taking time off to relax and write a new album, after an over two-year non-stop global touring schedule.

The band has been quoted as saying they were interested in "bowing out of the mass appeal madness" that has struck the hardcore scene and wants nothing to do with the "glossy culture" anymore. The band has been finished with their fourth album, Do Not Resuscitate, for some time. Do Not Resuscitate was released February 1, 2011 via Bullet Tooth, formerly Trustkill Records.

== Band members ==
=== Current members ===
- Justin Brannan – guitar
- Rachel Rosen – guitar, vocals
- Rob Fusco – vocals
- Matt Miller – bass guitar
- Colin Kercz – drums

=== Former members ===
- Tom Sheehan – vocals (2000–2003)
- Sean McCann – drums (2001–2004)
- Pete LaRussa – drums (2000)

== Discography ==
- Nothing in Vain (2001)
- Our Lady of Annihilation (2003)
- Merciless (2005)
- Do Not Resuscitate (2011)

Music videos

- "The Great Red Shift" (2003)
- "Shark Ethic" (2006)
