= Trustkill Records =

American record label

Trustkill Records'
- Founded: 1993
- Status: Active
- Distributor: Fontana Distribution
- Genre: Hardcore punk, metalcore, alternative rock
- Country of origin: U.S.
- Official website: trustkill.com

Trustkill Records is an American independent record label that started as a hardcore punk fanzine in April 1993. It started releasing hardcore, metal and rock records and merchandise in 1994. In 2010, the president of Trustkill, Josh Grabelle, formed a new label called Bullet Tooth Records. In 2022, the rights to the label were reverted to Grabelle and he resumed operations. The label has sold over two million albums worldwide.

== Distribution ==
On January 9, 2007, Trustkill signed a deal for exclusive distribution in North America with Fontana Distribution, which is under the Universal Music Group umbrella. Trustkill is also distributed by SPV (Europe), Shock (Australia), JVC/Howling Bull (Japan), David Gresham (South Africa), and Liberation (Brazil).

In 2009, independent hardcore label Think Fast! Records signed a worldwide distribution deal with Trustkill Records. Later in 2009, No Sleep Records also signed a worldwide distribution deal with Trustkill.

In June 2010, president/A&R Josh Grabelle left Trustkill Records and started a new label called Bullet Tooth Records. The label's distributor still holds the rights to all of the albums released through the label and will still continue to print Trustkill releases and use the Trustkill logo. Since it is unlikely that their distributor will continue to sign new bands and print new releases, Trustkill is considered to be a defunct label. Many of the bands that were signed to the label at this time were re-signed to Bullet Tooth including Memphis May Fire and Most Precious Blood.

In a 2012 interview, Grabelle announced the formation of another record label. Named Gypsey Diamond, it will sign and release music by pop and electronica artists.

In a 2013 interview with SoundCrave Magazine, Grabelle further explained the situation regarding Trustkill's demise:

I had to walk away from Trustkill. I got into a distribution deal that when I signed it made sense to everyone involved back in 2007. Fast forward it a few years and there was a whole new regime at the distribution company that didn’t necessarily like my deal. The business was kind of in a downward spiral and we got hit with a pretty bad recession all at once. They wouldn’t let me out of my deal, they stopped paying me. I couldn’t sign bands, I couldn’t pay bands. I just couldn’t do anything so I just had to walk away and start clean....I kind of held on to this hope that they would renegotiate or allow me to make some moves and continue on with Trustkill, but it didn’t work out that way. I just fought and fought for like a year and a half and they were just not budging.

== Controversies ==
Several bands signed to the label experienced problems, as detailed below.

=== Hopesfall ===
After their breakup at the beginning of 2008, Hopesfall began releasing negative comments about Trustkill including "I hate Trustkill and its owner. Hahahaha. He's not the reason we broke up but I (we) do hate him." The band claimed to be $20,000 in debt due to Trustkill's President, Josh Grabelle, and also claimed that Trustkill "ripped off the band" by removing songs from their final album Magnetic North without discussing it with the band first. The album was recorded, mastered, and ready to be released when the songs were removed by Trustkill. Hopesfall later released a downloadable file containing b-sides and demos from Magnetic North. In an interview on Ryan's Rock Show, drummer Jason Trabue stated that Grabelle added Hopesfall to Warped Tour in 2005, then two weeks into the tour, Grabelle stopped paying for the bus. The band had to take out a loan to pay the driver and get home. In the same interview, Trabue stated that Grabelle "pretty much owed every band on that label money."

In response to these issues, Grabelle stated that, "[Trabue] does not speak a shred of truth... I heard those guys got into some pretty hardcore drugs... and they are just miserable."

=== Bleeding Through ===
In 2007, Bleeding Through suggested to Trustkill that they would like to release a reissue of their 2006 release The Truth but the idea was rejected for various reasons. In 2008, Trustkill reissued The Truth with bonus tracks and a bonus DVD of which the band had no knowledge of. Bleeding Through believes that the reissue is a "fast and overt attempt to pay some bills." Bleeding Through also had issues with Trustkill and their new album Declaration. Trustkill violated the band's contract by letting them enter the studio in March 2008 and only funding less than 25% of the recording costs; the rest was paid via loans from lead singer Brandan Schieppati's father and the band's management. Bleeding Through commented on the current state of the label, "Trustkill no longer employs his sales guy, his art director or his publicist. 'Trustkill' is now Josh and one employee in his basement, as far as we can tell."

=== Throwdown ===
Throwdown ended their three-album contract with Trustkill Records in 2007 with their release of Venom and Tears. Nearly a year after the release, the band felt it was necessary to "air out years of dirty laundry with Josh Grabelle of Trustkill Records,"

=== It Dies Today ===
In late 2010, Nick Brooks and Mike Hatalak of It Dies Today formed a new group called The March. In a Myspace blog, the band posted lyrics to one of their first demos; a song titled "Harlots, Thieves, & Fakes." In the blog, a lyric line was capitalized as follows: "When TRUST is KILLed you'll only have yourself to blame." The band has not commented on the meaning of the song, but from the rest of the lyrics it can be inferred that they are referring to label president Josh Grabelle.

=== Terror ===
Todd Jones, formerly of the hardcore band Terror and currently of the band Nails, blasted label president Josh Grabelle in a 2011 interview, saying "I also regret ever having anything to do with Josh Grabelle; but I know karma is very real and will catch up with him (if it hasn't already)."

=== Poison the Well ===
In a 2013 podcast interview, Poison the Well drummer Chris Hornbrook spoke ill of the label and president Josh Grabelle, saying the band went through "dumb shit with that guy" and that he owed the band money.

=== Walls of Jericho ===
In a 2013 radio interview, Dustin Schoenhofer of Walls of Jericho claimed that the band had finally severed ties with Trustkill Records, stating that while the label helped the band get established, they "owe us quite a bit of money" and did not fully support the band while engaging in heavy festival touring.

== Roster ==
- Adversary (2008–2010)
- Another Victim
- ArmsBendBack (2003–2010)
- Awaken Demons (2009–2010)
- BEDlight for BlueEYES (2004–2009)
- Bleeding Through (2003–2009)
- Brother's Keeper
- Bullet for My Valentine
- Burn It Down
- Campfire
- Cast Iron Hike
- City Sleeps (2007–2010)
- Crash Romeo (2005–2010)
- Deception of a Ghost (2010)
- Despair
- Disaster of Impulse (2009-2010)
- Disembodied
- Eighteen Visions (1999–2007)
- Endeavor
- Fight Paris
- Fightstar (2007–2010)
- First Blood (2006–2010)
- The Great American Beast (2009–2010)
- The Great Deceiver
- Harvest
- Hopesfall (2002–2007)
- Idle Hands
- It Dies Today (2004–2010)
- Kid Liberty (2009–2010)
- Memphis May Fire (2007–2010)
- Most Precious Blood (2001–2010)
- Nora (1999–2010)
- One Nature
- Open Hand (2002–2010)
- Outbreak (2009–2010)
- Picturesque
- Poison the Well (1999–2003)
- Psycho Enhancer
- Racetraitor
- Roses Are Red (2004–2007)
- SeventyEightDays
- Shai Hulud
- Shenoem
- Sick City (2007–2010)
- Soldiers (2007–2010)
- Spark Lights The Friction
- StoneRider (2007–2010)
- Terror
- This Is Hell (2005–2009)
- Throwdown (2003–2008)
- Too Pure to Die (2007–2009)
- Turmoil
- VentanA (2009–2010)
- Victory in Numbers (2009–2010)
- Walls of Jericho (1999–2009)

== See also ==
- List of record labels
