= ArmsBendBack =

American band

- Origin: Philadelphia, Pennsylvania
- Genres: Alternative rock
- Years active: 2001–2006, 2009
- Labels: Trustkill Records
- Past members: Mike Coasey; Carson Slovak; Brad Sloan; Andrew Kegerise

ArmsBendBack is an American band formed in Philadelphia, Pennsylvania. The band was signed to Trustkill Records until it dissolved in 2010. ArmsBendBack's sound can be loosely defined as alternative rock, but the band takes influence from several genres, including hardcore, metalcore, and emo.

== Biography ==
ArmsBendBack was formed in July 2001 by vocalist Mike Coasey and guitarist Carson Slovak. After writing a slew of songs together in Slovak's Philadelphia apartment, the duo recruited Brad Sloan on bass and Andrew Kegerise on drums.

The band recorded a five track EP in 2002 titled Even Though I’ll Hurt You, which, along with a show opening for Underoath in Philadelphia, led to them being signed to New Jersey's Trustkill Records. In 2003, the band recorded their debut full-length album The Waiting Room. The album was released on October 7, 2003 and featured the single "The Arms of Automation," for which a music video was shot. The band toured in support of The Waiting Room before parting ways in 2006, with Slovak turning his side-project Century into a full-time endeavor.

In August 2009, vocalist Mike Coasey revealed that Armsbendback would be reforming and releasing a brand-new album. The band then created an official MySpace page, where they posted three new songs and announced November 10, 2009, as the tentative release date for their second full-length album on Trustkill Records. The self-titled record was released on schedule in digital-only format.

According to the band, the new material "represents the culmination of not only each member's creative evolution over the years, but also their personal maturation as long-time friends. Each song from the album spans the last eight years since the band's inception, some of them being the first tracks the band ever wrote and some being the last."

ArmsBendBack has responded to fan requests to tour, stating that although it would be fun, the band members are all currently busy with other projects, careers, and their personal lives.

== Members ==
- Mike Coasey – vocals
- Carson Slovak – guitar
- Brad Sloan – bass
- Andrew Kegerise – drums

== Discography ==
- Even Though I’ll Hurt You (EP) (2002)
- The Waiting Room (2003)
- Armsbendback (2009)
