= Long Since Forgotten =

- Origin: Syracuse, New York, USA
- Genres: Emo; Indie rock
- Years active: 1999–2009, 2012, 2017, 2019-
- Labels: Rocketstar Recordings; EVO Records
- Website: longsinceforgotten.net

Long Since Forgotten is an American band from Syracuse, New York.

== History ==
Long Since Forgotten formed in 1999 by brothers Josh and Caleb Coy along with Jeff French in Phoenix, NY, who self-released a full-length album, In All Honesty, and an EP, Monday 12AM, before adding a permanent drummer, Steve Stockin of Lafayette, NY, to their lineup. After regional touring, the group signed to RocketStar Recordings and released their second album, All the Things You Said in 2002, produced by Ed Rose. After a nationwide tour, a second album on RocketStar, Standing Room Only, followed in 2004, which was also produced by Rose. The band received a Syracuse Area Music Award (SAMMY) in the Best Rock category in 2005. In late 2007, the group released its fourth LP, The Theft, which was issued in Japan before seeing a release in the United States.

In August 2012, Long Since Forgotten performed a one-night-only show in Rochester, NY.

In September 2017 the band had another one-night-only reunion show in their hometown of Syracuse, NY where they played their album All The Things You Said in its entirety.

On February 9, 2019 they played a reunion show to celebrate the 15th anniversary of their album Standing Room Only and played it in its entirety.

== Members ==
- Josh Coy - guitar, vocals
- Caleb Coy - bass, vocals
- Jeff French - guitar
- Steve Stockin - drums

== Discography ==
- In All Honesty (2000)
- Monday 12AM EP (2001)
- All the Things You Said... (RocketStar Recordings, 2002)
- Standing Room Only (RocketStar, January 27, 2004)
- The Theft (EVO, 2007)
- I'm Sorry, I Thought You Were My Friend (self released, January 2019)
