= Love Is Red =

Defunct American melodic hardcore band

Love is Red
- Origin: Nashville, Tennessee
- Genres: Hardcore punk, melodic hardcore
- Years active: 2000-2005
- Label: Stillborn
- Members: Adam Riser; Hunter Weeks; Jeff Yancey; Kyle Mims; Roger Kilburn
- Past members: Rob McFeters; Dane Taylor; Kinsman Mackay

Love is Red was an American melodic hardcore band hailing from Nashville, Tennessee. The band formed in 2000. In Florence, Alabama with the original line up of Rob Mcfeters (vocals), Dane Taylor (drums), Adam Riser (guitar), Roger Kilburn (guitar), and Kinsman Mackay (bass). After their first demo, the band released their debut full-length record, All Thats Ahead Points to Forever, on the Kansas City based indie record label Recorse Records. After a few southeastern tours, Rob Mcfeters quit the band. The band recruited Hunter Weeks on vocals. The band then re-recorded some demo tracks and released a split EP on Recorse Records with Nashville Band, Olivers Army in 2002.

== History ==
The band toured the east coast for a while until Dane Taylor and Kinsman Mackay quit the band . New members Kyle Mims (drums), and Jeff Yancey (Bass), joined the band to form their final line up. The band toured the United States extensively for a few years and finally caught the attention of Jamey Jasta from the band Hatebreed and the founder of record label Stillborn Records. The band recorded a full-length album on Stillborn called "The Hardest Fight" in 2004. The band toured on this record with such bands as Hatebreed, Sick of It All, Most Precious Blood, Underoath, Saosin, Strung Out, Agnostic Front, With Honor, Embrace Today, and others. They played Hellfest, Furnace Fest and Stillborn Fest multiple years. Love is Red shot a video that aired on MTV2 for the heavy music show Headbangers Ball, hosted by Jamey Jasta. The video featured a single, "Close my Eyes", from their last release. The band then had some turbulent times, and only after a year of touring on the newest album, they broke up in the early spring of 2005.

Many members of Love is Red have gone on to play with other melodic hardcore bands. Kyle Mims quickly joined the band Evergreen Terrace and played with them until 2010. Adam Riser played live guitars with the California hardcore band Betrayed, and has since started his own metal project called Lone Wolf. Hunter Weeks started Depression w members who went on to start Foundation (Atlanta), Roger Kilburn joined the hardcore punk band Sinking Ships, which broke up in 2008, and is currently playing in the hardcore band Wait in Vain, featuring members from the Seattle hardcore band Trial, Braeg Naofa and Plays bass currently in Trial. Jeff Yancey played bass for Haunted Life (Chicago), Bracewar (Richmond) and Cast Aside (Richmond).

On December 18, 2010, Love Is Red got back together to play a reunion show in Nashville, TN at Rocketown with Hollywood, xTraitorx, Ill Patriot, and ModernHell.

Love Is Red played Furnace Fest in September 2021, and re-issued The Hardest Fight on vinyl along with a new EP, Darkness Is Waiting as the B-side in July 2021.

== Discography ==
- All Thats Ahead Points To Forever (Recorse Records, 2000)
- Love is Red/Olivers Army Split (Recorse Records, 2002)
- Dixxxie Hardcore Demo (self-released, 2003)
- "The Hardest Fight" (Stillborn Records, 2004/Remixed and remaster and put out on vinyl in 2021)
- ”Darkness Is Waiting” (Selt Released, 2021)
