= XweaponX =

American band

Background information
- Origin: Louisville, Kentucky, U.S.
- Genres: Metalcore; beatdown hardcore
- Years active: 2022–present
- Label: DAZE Records
- Spinoff of: Knocked Loose; Harm's Way; Gates to Hell; Heartstopper
- Members: Dave Baugher; Bryan Garris; Isaac Hale; Trey Garris

XweaponX is an American straight edge hardcore band from Louisville, Kentucky. Formed as a side project featuring members from the core Louisville hardcore scene—including long-standing members of Knocked Loose—the band has quickly garnered attention for its energetic style and uncompromising sound within the straight edge movement.

== History ==
XweaponX debuted in the scene with a surprise split release titled Weapon Of Pleasure with World Of Pleasure in March 2023. The band further built its reputation with the release of the critically acclaimed Weapon X Demo, which reviewers described as "an instant straight edge hardcore classic." More recently, XweaponX issued a new single, "Everybody Breaks," signaling their continued evolution and commitment to the genre.

== Musical style and influences ==
XweaponX's sound is characterized by aggressive, fast-paced rhythms, heavy breakdowns, and a raw vocal delivery. Their music blends elements of traditional hardcore punk with modern metalcore, all filtered through the lens of the straight edge ethos. This yields a style that is both uncompromising in its energy and tightly focused on the aesthetic and ethical principles of the movement.

== Discography ==
- Weapon X Demo (2022)
- Weapon of Pleasure Split EP (2023) - (with World of Pleasure)
- Everybody Breaks (2025) – single
- Weapon X Demo 2 (2025)

== Members ==
Current

- Dave Baugher – vocals (2022–present)
- Bryan Garris – bass (2022–present)
- Isaac Hale – guitar (2022–present)
- Trey Garris – drums (2022–present)

Former

- Bo Lueders – guitar (2023–2025, died 2026)
