= The A.K.A.s =

American rock band

- Origin: Philadelphia, US
- Genres: Dance-rock, indie rock
- Years active: Beginning 2003
- Labels: Fueled by Ramen; Metropolis Records; Asian Man Records
- Members: Mike Ski; Josie Outlaw; Nick Carlisi; Chachi Darin; Michael Camino
- Website: http://www.theakas.com

The A.K.A.s, a.k.a. The A.K.A.s (Are Everywhere!) is a band that started in Pittsburgh and relocated to New York City and later relocated to Philadelphia, Pennsylvania. They call their music "dancehall fight music". They released their debut album White Doves & Smoking Guns on Fueled by Ramen's record label. Their second album, Everybody Make Some Noise!, was released March 18, 2008, on Metropolis Records.

Vocalist Mike Ski and keyboardist Josie Outlaw make an appearance on Melissa Cross's instruction DVD The Zen of Screaming. The A.K.A.s also appear on Asian Man Records' Plea For Peace, Vol. 2 compilation CD with their song "Confessions of a Dangerous Mouth".

== Members ==
=== As of December 2009 ===
- Mike Ski – lead vocals
- Josie Outlaw – keyboards

=== Former members ===
- Chris Bazan – guitar
- Chachi Darin – drums
- Lukas Previn – guitar
- Chad Bowser – bass
- Bobby Williams – drums
- Michael Camino – bass
- Justin Perry – bass
- Vegas Davis – guitar
- Mark Toohey – drums
- Nina Aron – keyboards

== Discography ==
Date of release	Title	Record label
September 9, 2003	White Doves & Smoking Guns	Fueled by Ramen
March 18, 2008	Everybody Make Some Noise!	Metropolis Records
June 25, 2009	Animal Summer	Paper + Plastick
