= Reach the Sky =

American hardcore punk band

- Origin: Boston, Massachusetts, United States
- Genres: Hardcore punk, melodic hardcore
- Years active: 1997–2003
- Labels: Victory Records
- Past members: Chris Chasse; Brendan "Stu" Maguire; Bob Mahoney; Ian Larrabee; Dan Tammik

Reach the Sky was an American hardcore punk band from Boston, Massachusetts, United States.

== History ==
Reach the Sky formed in 1997, and they released two EPs in 1999; their debut full-length, So Far From Home, followed on Victory Records later that same year. After the release of So Far From Home, Dan Tammik left the band, and guitarist Brendan Maguire took over on bass. Their second full-length, Friends, Lies, and the End of the World, was issued in 2001, and the group toured Canada after the album's release. In 2002, their debut EP was remastered and reissued with bonus tracks. They broke up in 2003. In 2009, they reformed with a slightly different line up: Ian, Stu, Bob and Zach Jordan of Bane.

Bob went on to become a member of Bane, and Ian later founded Stand Accused. Stu became a touring manager, working with Sick of it All, Dropkick Murphys and The Mighty Mighty Bosstones. He went on to play in Bane before dying of cancer in June 2021.

== Members ==
- Chris Chasse - guitar (now member of Great Collapse and Nations Afire, ex-member of Rise Against)
- Brendan "Stu" Maguire - guitar (died 2021, ex-member of Bane)
- Bob Mahoney - drums (ex-member of Bane)
- Ian Larrabee - vocals
- Dan Tammik - bass

== Discography ==
- Open Roads and Broken Dreams EP (East Coast Empire, 1999)
- Everybody's Hero EP (Victory Records, 1999)
- So Far From Home (Victory, 1999)
- Split 7" with Buried Alive (Indecision Records, 2000)
- Friends, Lies, and the End of the World (Victory, 2001)
- Open Roads and Broken Dreams EP, reissue with bonus tracks (Deathwish Inc., 2002)
- Transient Hearts EP (Victory, 2002)

=== Music videos ===
- "A Year and a Smile" (2001)
- "Maybe Next Year" (2002)
