= Martyr A.D. =

American metalcore band

- Origin: Minneapolis, Minnesota, U.S.
- Genres: Metalcore
- Years active: 2000–2005, 2017, 2018
- Labels: Ferret, Victory
- Spinoff of: Disembodied
- Website: Martyr A.D., ferretstyle.com

Martyr A.D. is an American metalcore band formed in late 1999 from former members of the band Disembodied. Joel Johnson (guitar), Tara Johnson (bass) and Justin Kane (drums) joined with newcomers Charlie Johnson (guitar) and Mike Fisketti (vocals). After the departures of Kane and Fisketti in 2002, Andrew Hart and Karl Hensel from Minneapolis, Minnesota band Holding On took over on vocal and drum duties, respectively.

Martyr A.D. released their first album The Human Condition in Twelve Fractions with the indie label Ferret Music in 2001. The band's second and last album, On Earth as it is in Hell, was released on April 20, 2004, through Victory Records.

Martyr A.D. has toured with such bands as Poison the Well, Throwdown, The Haunted, Bury Your Dead, and Walls of Jericho.

The band disbanded for unknown reasons in April 2005. All three Johnsons (Joel, Tara, Charles) were featured in the reformation of Disembodied.

The band additionally reunited for a performance at This is Hardcore 2017.

== Impact on the metalcore scene ==
Martyr A.D. significantly influenced the early 2000s metalcore scene by blending hardcore aggression with melodic death metal elements. Their 2004 album, On Earth as It Is in Hell, showcased a raw, unpolished sound that resonated with fans seeking authenticity in a genre becoming increasingly commercialized. Bands like Renounced and Buried Truth cite Martyr A.D. as pivotal influences, highlighting their impact on shaping the "pissed metalcore" subgenre.

== Members ==
- Mike Paradise – drums (2017)
- Michael James Fisketti – vocals
- Joel Andrew Johnson – guitar
- Charles Allan Johnson – guitar, vocals
- Tara Lee Johnson – bass
- Justin James Kane – drums
- Andrew James Hart – vocals Summer '03 Demo, On Earth as it is in Hell
- Karl Englebert Hensel – drums Summer '03 Demo, On Earth as it is in Hell

== Discography ==
- Human Condition demo (2000)
- The Human Condition in Twelve Fractions (Ferret Music; 2001)
- Jared Demo (featuring Jared from 7 Angels 7 Plagues; 2002)
- Summer '03 Demo (2003)
- On Earth as it is in Hell (Victory Records; 2004)
