= Brother's Keeper (band) =

American metalcore band

- Origin: Erie, Pennsylvania, U.S.
- Genres: Hardcore punk, metalcore
- Years active: 1994–2003, 2026
- Labels: Trustkill Records (1996–2003); Ides of March Records
- Past members: Mike Ski

Brother's Keeper IS an American metalcore band from Erie, Pennsylvania.

== History ==
Formed in 1994 by members of a number of other local bands, Brother's Keeper became the backbone of the Erie hardcore punk and metalcore scene. Alongside bands like xDISCIPLEx A.D., Digression and Neverfall, they created a local community of youth bonded by a common musical interest. Brother's Keeper's sound stood out due to the unique vocal style of Mike Ski.

The band released five CDs as well as a number of 7" records. From 1996 through their breakup in 2003, they were signed to Trustkill Records, although in early 2001 they appeared on the various artists compilation It's All About The Money, co-released by Schauffele's own label Surprise Attack Records, Goodfellow Records and Redstar Records.

On July 10, 2026 they released an unannounced track Asymmetrical Warflair with an appearance by Patrick Kindlon of the band Drug Church. In the weeks following, they announced two reunion shows set for October 16-17, 2026. They also announced and progressively released 11 re-recorded songs in batches, culminating with a full-length album titled You Can't Kill Me.

On October 19, 2026 they announced their third show after reuniting - set for December 19, 2026 in Louisville, KY.

== Releases ==
EPs

- Shadowcast (7") – 1994
- Ladder (7") – 1995
- Self-Fulfilling Prophecy (Trustkill Records 7")
- Sweet Revenge (7"/CS)
- Five Hits From Hell (Ides of March Records)

Studio albums

- The Continuum (Trustkill Records) – 1996
- ForeverNeverEnding (Trustkill Records)
- Oxymoron (Trustkill Records 12"/MCD)
- Fantasy Killer (Trustkill Records) – 2001
- You Can't Kill Me (Lake Effect Records) - 2026

== Members ==
Last known lineup

- Mike Ski – Vocals (1994–2003, 2026)
- Chris Bazan – Guitars (1997–2001, 2026)
- Scott Emhoff – Guitars (1994–2003, 2026)
- Eric "EMS" Schauffele – Bass (1995–2003, 2026)
- Bob Williams – Drums (1994–1997, 2026)

Former

- Roger Hurlburt – Guitars (1994–1997)
- Mike Peters – Guitars (2001–2002)
- Nate Black – Bass (1995)
- Jason Hoderny – Drums (1994)
- Zach Hudock – Drums (1998–2001)
- Rich Cali – Drums (2001)
- Ben Lythberg – Drums (2002)
