= Embrace Today =

American metalcore band

- Origin: Boston, MA, USA
- Genres: Metalcore (later); Youth Crew (early)
- Years active: 1998–2006
- Labels: Deathwish Inc.
- Members: Steve Peacock; Scott Peacock; Scott Wilde; Andy Vickery; Ben Fowers

Embrace Today were an American straight edge metalcore–hardcore punk band from Boston, Massachusetts. They have toured with such bands as Bleeding Through, Champion, Bury Your Dead, Ion Dissonance, Premonitions of War, Since The Flood, and Haste the Day. Based on their 2002 release "FxYxIxE," ExT is perhaps best known for a militant straight edge approach during their live shows and for creating a "Fuck You I'm Edge" mentality within the hardcore scene. They are often considered the heir apparent to Syracuse, Straight Edge juggernauts Earth Crisis. Embrace Today was considered one of the hardest-working bands of their time having toured non-stop for years.

== Discography ==
- ...For the Kids (1999, Good Intention Records)
- Breaking the Code of Silence (2000, Shore's Edge Records)
- FxYxIxE (Fuck You I'm Edge) (2002, The Life Recording Company)
- Soldiers (2003, Deathwish Inc.)
- We Are The Enemy (2005, Deathwish Inc.)
