= Caitiff =

Caitiff (literally a despicable coward or wretch) may mean:

- a galley-slave in a Barbary bagnio
- a Camarilla clanless character in Vampire: The Masquerade
- The Caitiff Choir, an album released by the band It Dies Today
