= A Liar Wrote This =

Studio album by The Bunny the Bear
- Released: July 24, 2015
- Recorded: January–May 2015 at Watchmen Recording Studios, Lockport, New York
- Genre: Post-hardcore, experimental rock, alternative rock, symphonic rock, metalcore
- Length: 42:44
- Label: Victory
- Producer: Doug White, Matthew Tybor

The Bunny the Bear chronology
Food Chain (2014)	A Liar Wrote This (2015)	The Way We Rust (2017)

Singles from Stories
- 1. "It's Not Always Cold in Buffalo (Revisited)" Released: 25 May 2015; 2. "Lover's Touch" Released: 16 June 2015

Professional ratings
Review scores
Source	Rating
New Noise Magazine	3/5 stars
New Transcendence	8.5/10
Rock Revolt Magazine	4/5 stars
Sputnikmusic	3.5/5 stars

A Liar Wrote This is the sixth studio album by post-hardcore band The Bunny the Bear, released through Victory Records on July 24, 2015. It is the band's first release without founding clean vocalist Chris Hutka, and the first and only release to feature Haley Roback. The album's title is derived from Tybor's side project, "A Liar Wrote This Symphony."

The album was recorded in early 2015 shortly after the departure of Chris Hutka. The album was announced in June 2015, with an accompanying single, "Lover's Touch." A re-recorded version of "It's Not Always Cold in Buffalo" (originally on Stories) was included on the album and released with an accompanying music video.

Three of the album's tracks: Curtain Call, Somewhat Standards, and Sleep Sequence, were originally recorded by A Liar Wrote This Symphony in 2012.

== Track listing ==
No.	Title	Length
1.	"Vows"	0:25
2.	"Love, Trust and Compromise"	2:40
3.	"Curtain Call"	4:42
4.	"Sick, Sad Eyes"	3:25
5.	"Empty Hands"	2:51
6.	"Lover's Touch"	3:06
7.	"Oblivion"	3:22
8.	"It's Not Always Cold in Buffalo (Revisited)"	3:33
9.	"Sleep Sequence"	4:48
10.	"Somewhat Standards"	3:16
11.	"Loose Lips"	2:54
12.	"Dead Leaves"	3:58
13.	"Motions"	3:50
Total length:		42:44

== Personnel ==
=== The Bunny the Bear ===
- Haley "The Bear" Roback - clean vocals
- Matthew "The Bunny" Tybor - unclean vocals, additional clean vocals, songwriting, lyrics, producing, bass

=== Additional personnel ===
- Doug White - guitars, producing, engineering
- Matthew McGinley - drums, percussion, additional production
- Joe Mosey - guitar on "Love, Trust, and Compromise"
- Jacob Boyce - additional guitar on "Curtain Call"
- Steve Drachenberg - bass on "Sick, Sad Eyes"
- Nate Blasdell - guitar on "Sick, Sad Eyes"
- Brandy Wynn - violin
- Val Hill - drums on "Loose Lips"
- Ali Lander-Shindler - album artwork and layout
