= Food chain (disambiguation) =

The food chain in ecology is a chain of trophic relations.

Food chain can refer to the food system, the complex economic and ecological systems that bring food to consumers.

Food chain may also refer to:

- Food Chain (Buffy comic), a comic based on Buffy the Vampire Slayer
- "Food Chain" (Adventure Time), an episode of an animated series
- The Food Chain, a Philippine-based charity
- The Food Chain, a 2014 play by Nicky Silver
- The Food Chain, a 1984 book by Michael Allaby
- Food Chains, a 2014 film
- Food Chain (EP), a 2014 EP by Sean Danielsen
- Food Chain (album), a 2014 album by The Bunny the Bear
- The Food Chain, a radio show on the BBC World Service

== See also ==
- Food web
