= Stories (The Bunny the Bear album) =

Studio album by The Bunny the Bear
- Released: April 16, 2013
- Recorded: 2012–2013
- Studio: Watchmen Recording Studios, Lockport, New York
- Genre: Post-hardcore, synthpop, electronic rock, alternative dance
- Length: 42:09
- Label: Victory
- Producer: Doug White, Matthew Tybor

The Bunny the Bear chronology
The Stomach for It (2012)	Stories (2013)	Food Chain (2014)

Singles from Stories
- 1. "Another Day" Released: April 3, 2013; 2. "In Like Flynn" Released: April 9, 2013; 3. "Sadie" Released: August 18, 2013

Professional ratings
Review scores
Source	Rating
Alternative Press	2.5/5 stars
New Transcendence	10/10
PopMatters	8/10

Stories is the fourth studio album by post-hardcore band The Bunny the Bear, released through Victory Records on April 16, 2013. The album peaked at number 24 on the Billboard Top Heatseekers chart.

The album was announced in February 2013, and spawned two singles, "Another Day" and "In Like Flynn" prior its release in April 2013. "In Like Flynn" was released with an accompanying music video, which won music video of the year on Victory Records in 2013.

An additional single from the album, "Sadie," was released the following August, with a music video.

The album marks the first release with studio musicians Doug White (guitar) and Matt McGinley (drums). White, the owner of Watchmen Recording Studios in Lockport, New York had produced the band's previous two albums.

"It's Not Always Cold in Buffalo" was originally recorded in early 2012 by Tybor's side project "A Liar Wrote This Symphony," featuring singing by Chris Hutka. The version heard on Stories features altered instrumentation and re-recorded vocals. On May 25, 2015, another re-recorded version of "It's Not Always Cold in Buffalo" was released with an accompanying music video, featuring the vocals of Haley Roback, the band's new clean vocalist. This version was featured on the band's sixth album A Liar Wrote This.

== Track listing ==
No.	Title	Length
1.	"Eating Disorder"	3:05
2.	"In Like Flynn"	3:40
3.	"Hey, Allie"	3:15
4.	"It's Not Always Cold in Buffalo"	3:32
5.	"Another Day"	4:12
6.	"The Frog"	3:49
7.	"Melody"	4:06
8.	"Imagine"	3:19
9.	"Your Reasons"	4:05
10.	"What We're Here For"	5:21
11.	"Sadie"	3:45
Total length:		42:09

== Chart performance ==
Chart (2013)	Peak position
US Billboard Top Heatseekers	24

== Personnel ==
=== The Bunny the Bear ===
- Chris "The Bear" Hutka - clean vocals
- Matthew "The Bunny" Tybor - unclean vocals, additional clean vocals, songwriting, lyrics, producing, bass

=== Additional personnel ===
- Doug White - guitars, producing, engineering
- Matthew McGinley - drums, percussion
- Jen Palmer - additional vocals
