= Watchmen Recording Studios =

Coordinates: 43°07′59″N 78°41′38″W

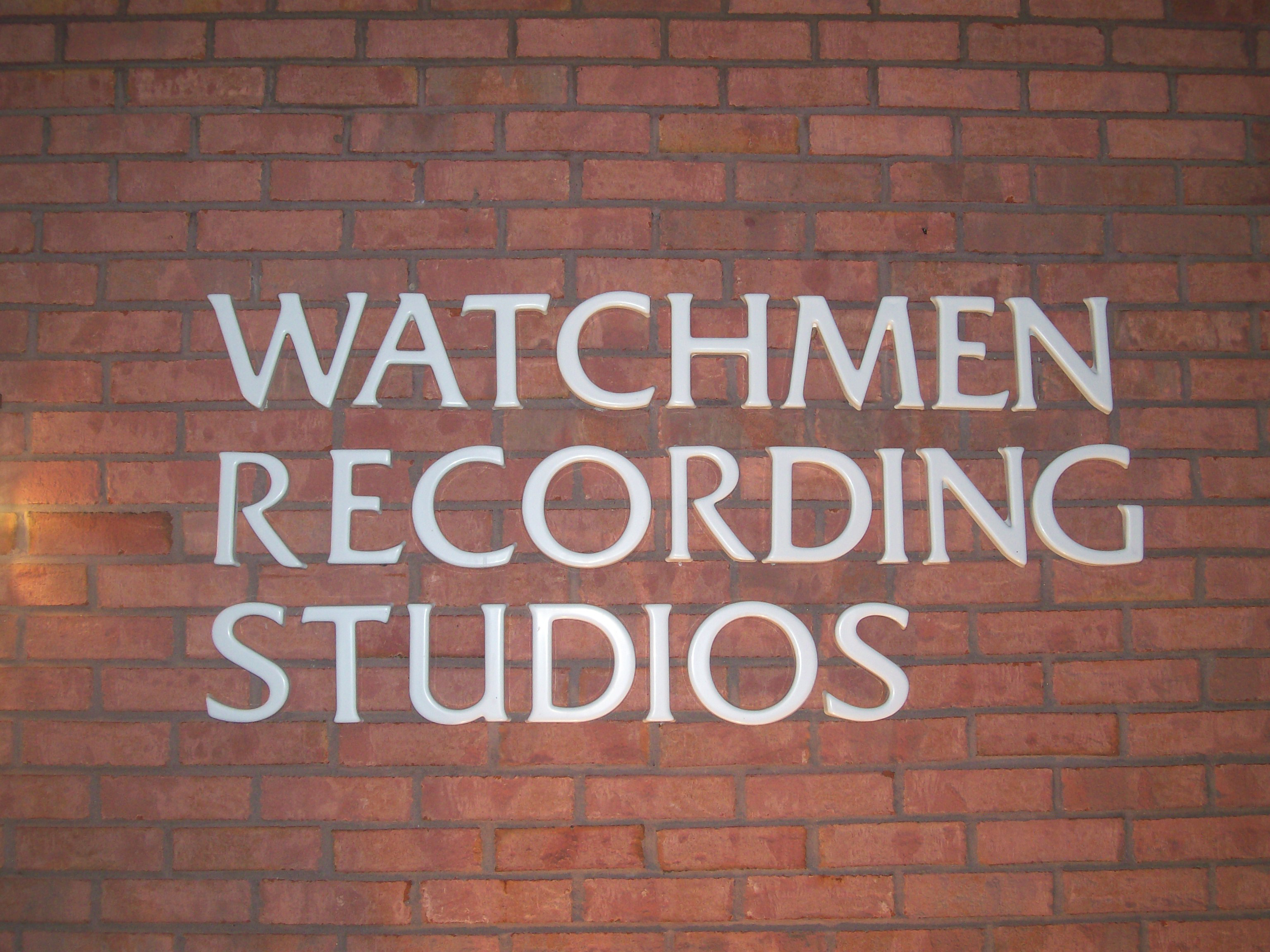
- The front entrance to Watchmen Studios
- Industry: Music production
- Genre: Various (rock, shoegaze, dream pop, metal, goth, etc.)
- Founded: Lockport, New York (1995)
- Founder: Doug White
- Services: Recording studio, music production
- Website: watchmenstudios.com/index.htm

Watchmen Recording Studios is a music recording facility owned and operated by Doug White, located in Lockport, New York, U.S. The studio opened to the public in 1995, and as of 2013 over 4,000 bands and artists have recorded at the location. These include regional and national acts such as Gym Class Heroes, Psyopus, The Bunny The Bear, and Brutal Truth, as well as labels such as Relapse Records, Victory Records, Metal Blade Records, Willowtip Records and Century Media Records.

== History ==
=== Founding by Doug White ===
Watchmen Studios was founded by musician and producer Doug White in 1989, after he returned home to Western New York from The Art Institute of Atlanta with an associate degree in Audio Engineering and Music Management.

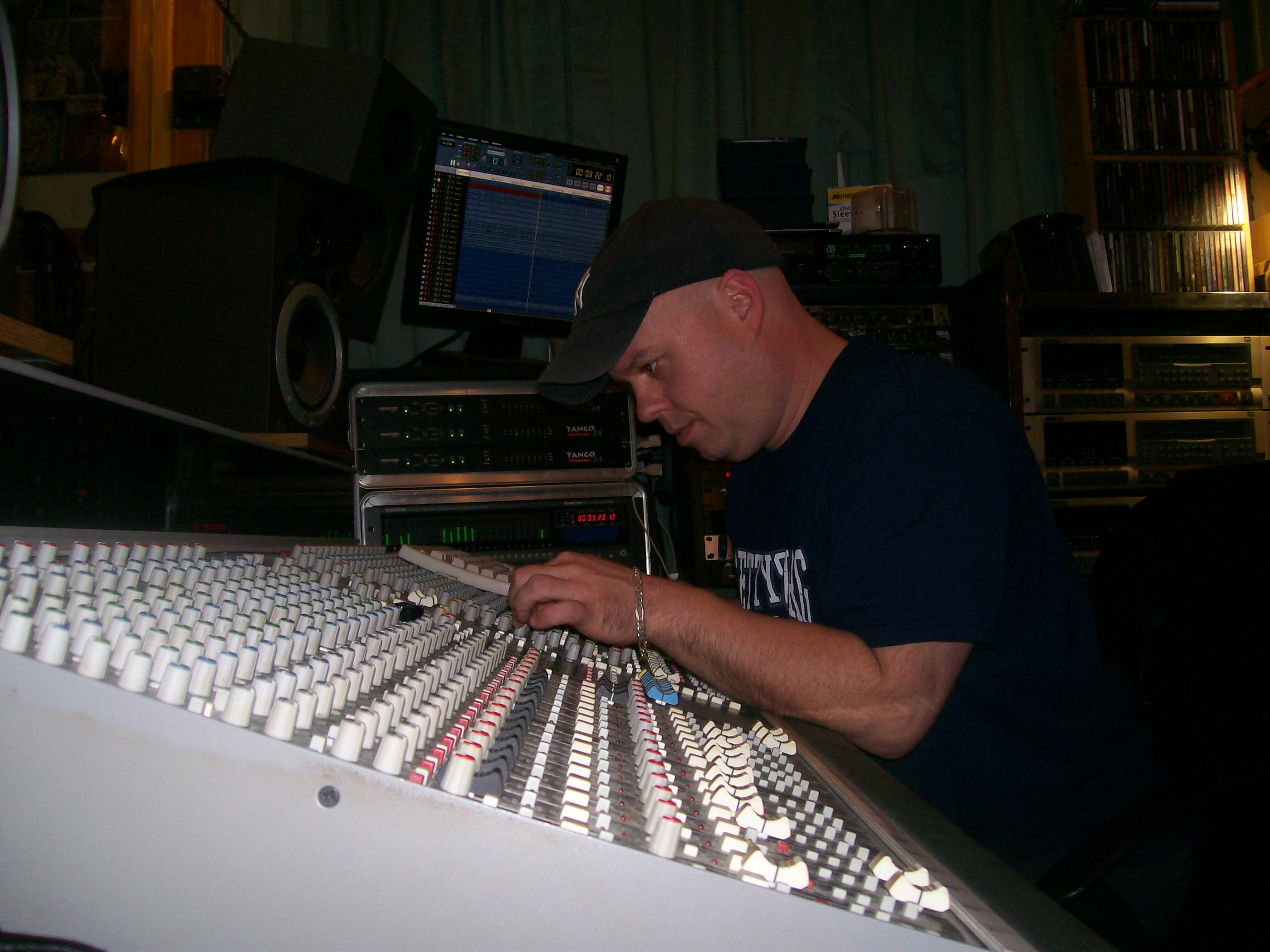
Doug White working at the studio in 2008

The studio originated in White's parent's basement, where he and his band mates at the time built a small facility to do their own recording. White's band's name was the Watchmen, a reference to the Alan Moore comics. Because only his band was recording at the time, the studio itself inherited the name. A few years later the business went commercial as Watchmen Studios and the name stuck.

The Watchmen disbanded with some members going on to form Snapcase, while White stayed on with recording, building up a base of clients. In 1995 he moved the studio permanently into a commercial building in Lockport, creating a small eight room studio.

=== Releases ===
The band Lemuria recorded all their albums as of 2008 in the studio, including 2007's Get Better.

"All of our records have been recorded at...Watchmen Studios, with the exception of the split 7” we did with Frame... I think our growing comfort with the studio and Doug White who runs the place is responsible for the quality of the recording and our performance on it. Doug even turns on some mood lighting while I drum."
— Alex Kerns of Lemuria (2008)

Doug White was given two awards from the RIAA for 1,000,000 copies sold for the single "Cupid's Chokehold" by the band Gym Class Heroes. The other award presented to White was for 500,000 copies sold of the Gym Class Hero's album As Cruel as School Children (2006). White also produced the debut album ...For the Kids for the Gym Class Heroes.

As of 2013, over 4000 bands and artists have recorded at the location. These include small regional acts and larger names such as Gym Class Heroes, Psyopus, The Bunny The Bear, Brutal Truth, as well as working with labels such as Relapse Records, Victory Records, Metal Blade Records, and Century Media Records. White notes: "Working with many different types of budgets has been the key for Watchmen Studios, big or small, turning out consistent product for many years."

=== Associated bands ===
Tearwave was Doug White's next band, and they've been associated with the label since their founding. They were signed to Projekt Records, which is owned by Sam Rosenthal. Tearwave released two albums under Projekt Records, the first (in 2007) was self-titled and the second release (2008) was titled A Different Shade of Beauty. Tearwave was disbanded in 2009.

In an interview with The Apparatus, Doug talks about Tearwave:

Tearwave is an old school shoegaze band in the vein of Cocteau Twins, Slowdive, Lush. We are signed to the legendary goth label Projekt. Shoegaze has always been a passion of mine. The sad ambient textures and flowing female vocals were always something I loved to listen to. So I put Tearwave together last year and it all happened really quickly for us. We got very lucky.

After Tearwave disintegrated Doug White assembled Makaras Pen, also signed to Projekt Records. In 2010 they released a self-titled debut album, followed in 2011 by A Petal Among Bricks. With a consistent shoegaze and dream pop sound, the band continues to record music and create music videos.

== Studio equipment ==
As of September 2013, the following equipment is in use at the studio:

- Allen & Heath 32X8 Bus Console
- HDR 24/96 Mackie Hard Drive Digital Editor
- ADAT XT-20 24 Track

Effects

- Lexicon Reverb
- Zoom Effects
- DOD effects
- Alesis Effects
- Ashley Compression
- DBX 266+166 Compression
- Peavey Compression
- PreSonus Compression
- TC Electronics

Mics and Preamps

- Allen & Heath (Neve Modeled)
- Preonus
- AKG Mics
- Sennheiser Mics
- Sure Mics
- York Mics

Amps/Guitars

- Mesa Boogie Triple Rectifier and Cab
- Marshall Valve State 100 and Cab
- Orange 50 Watt
- Trace Elliot and Cab
- Fender Deluxe Deville
- Custom Les Paul
- Paul Reed Smith Ten Top Custom
- Acoustic Martin
- Ibanez Electric- R6550
- EBO
- Full line of BOSS Pedals

Headphones

- Sony Headphones
- AKG Headphones

Full Soundforge Mastering

- Steinburg Plugins
- Melodyne Vocal Correction
- Pro Tools L.E.

=== Studio gallery ===
The following photographs of the inside of the studio were taken in 2008.

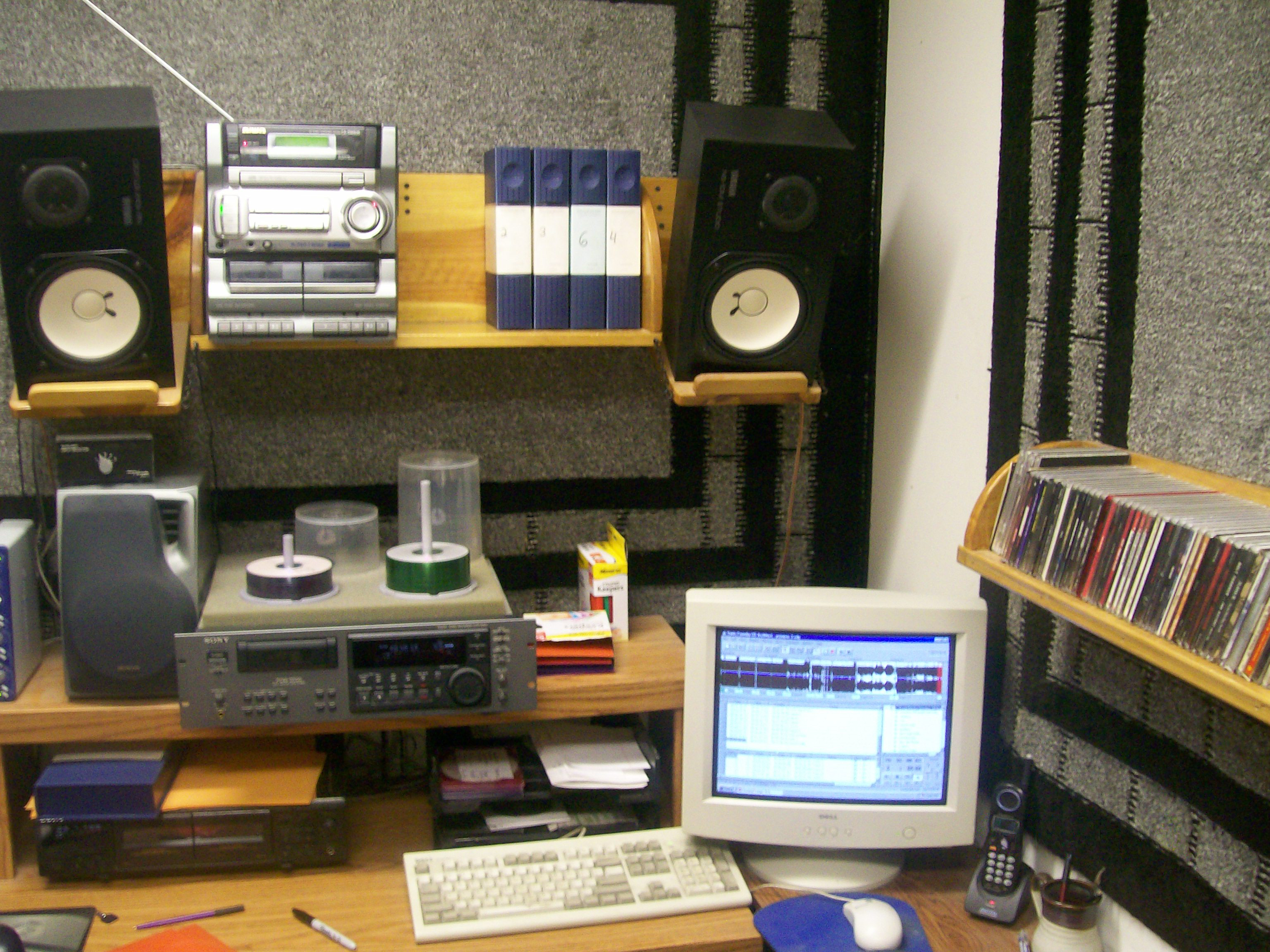
Mastering room

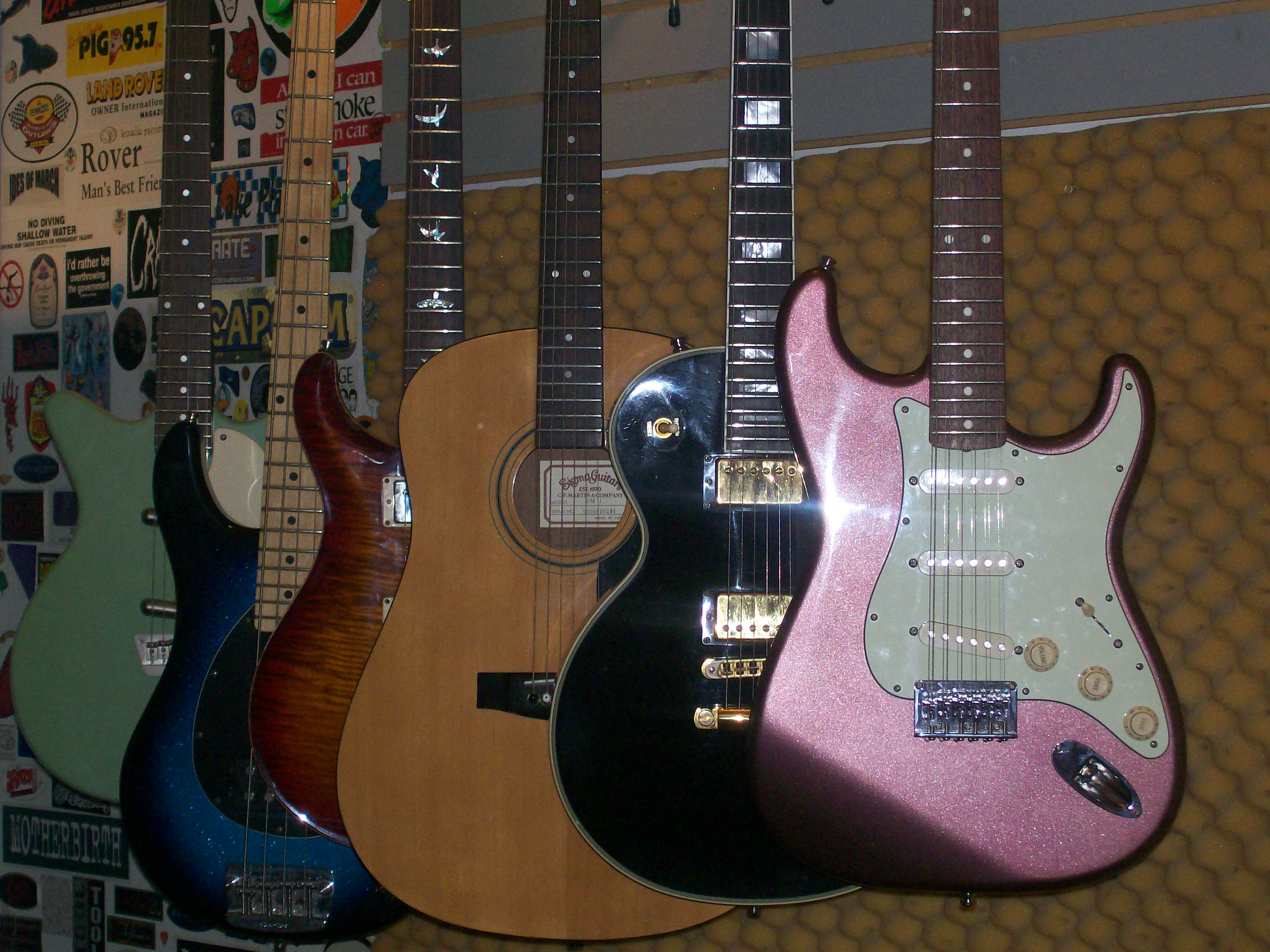
Available guitars

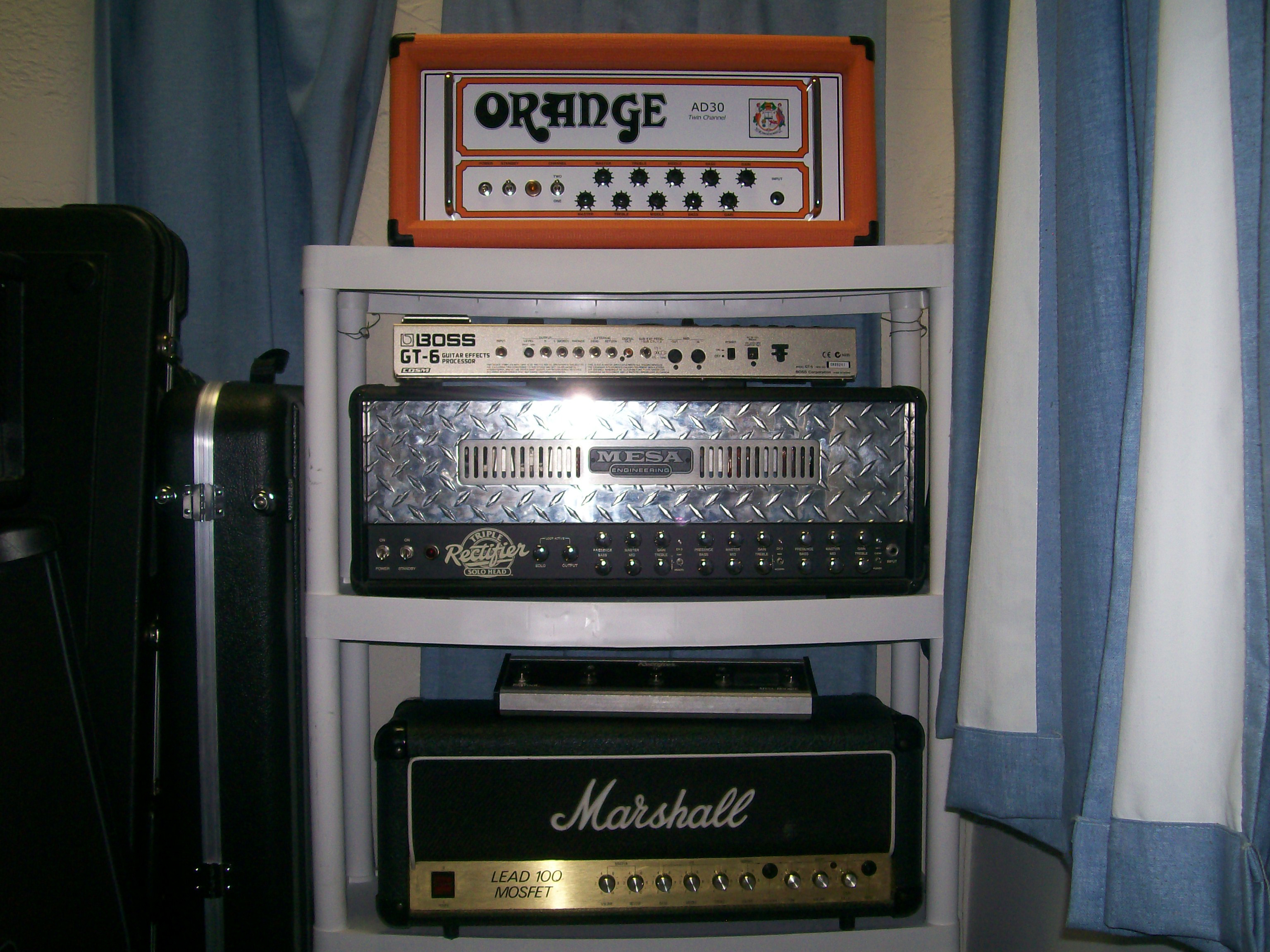
Available amp heads

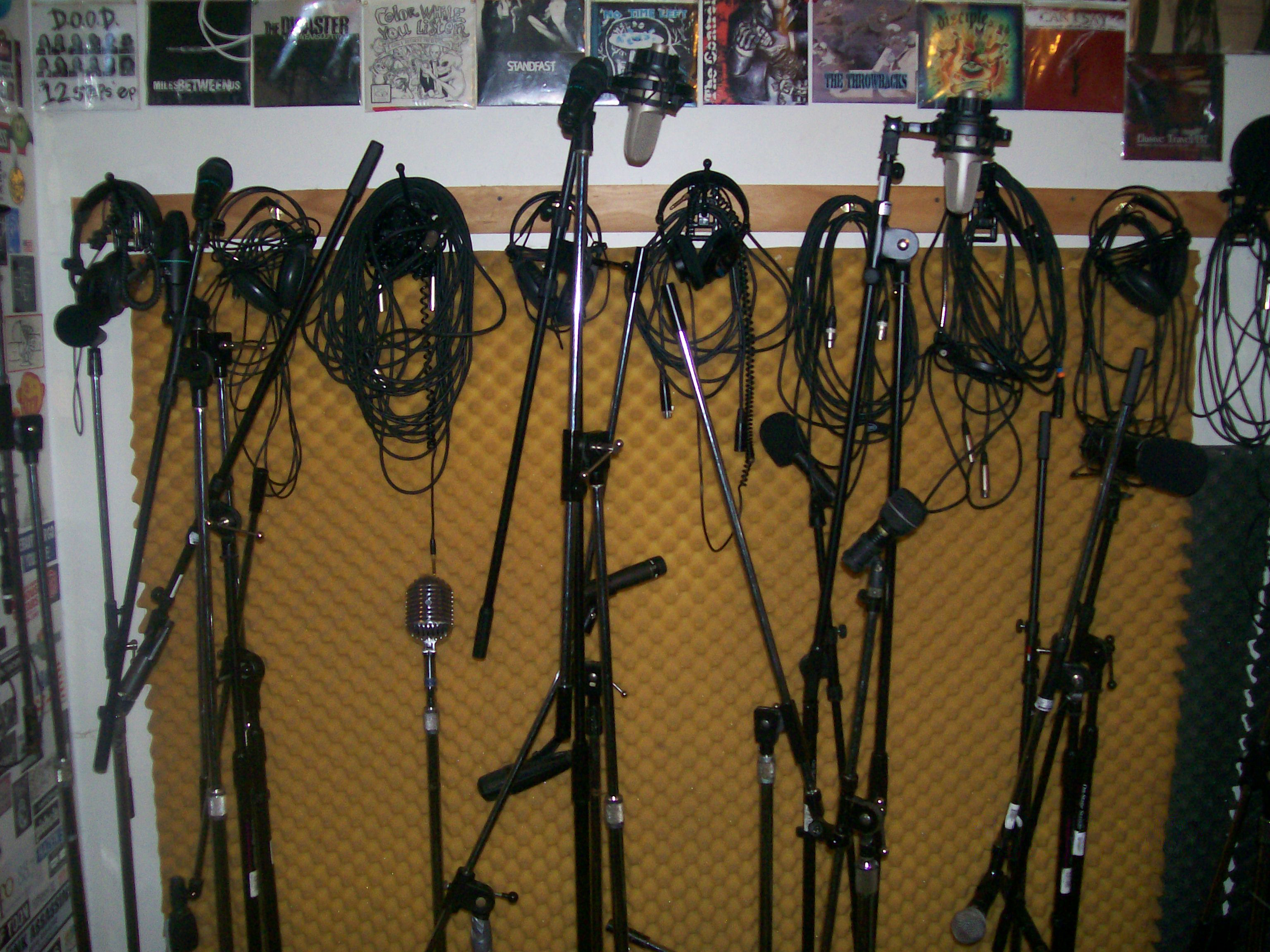
Available microphones

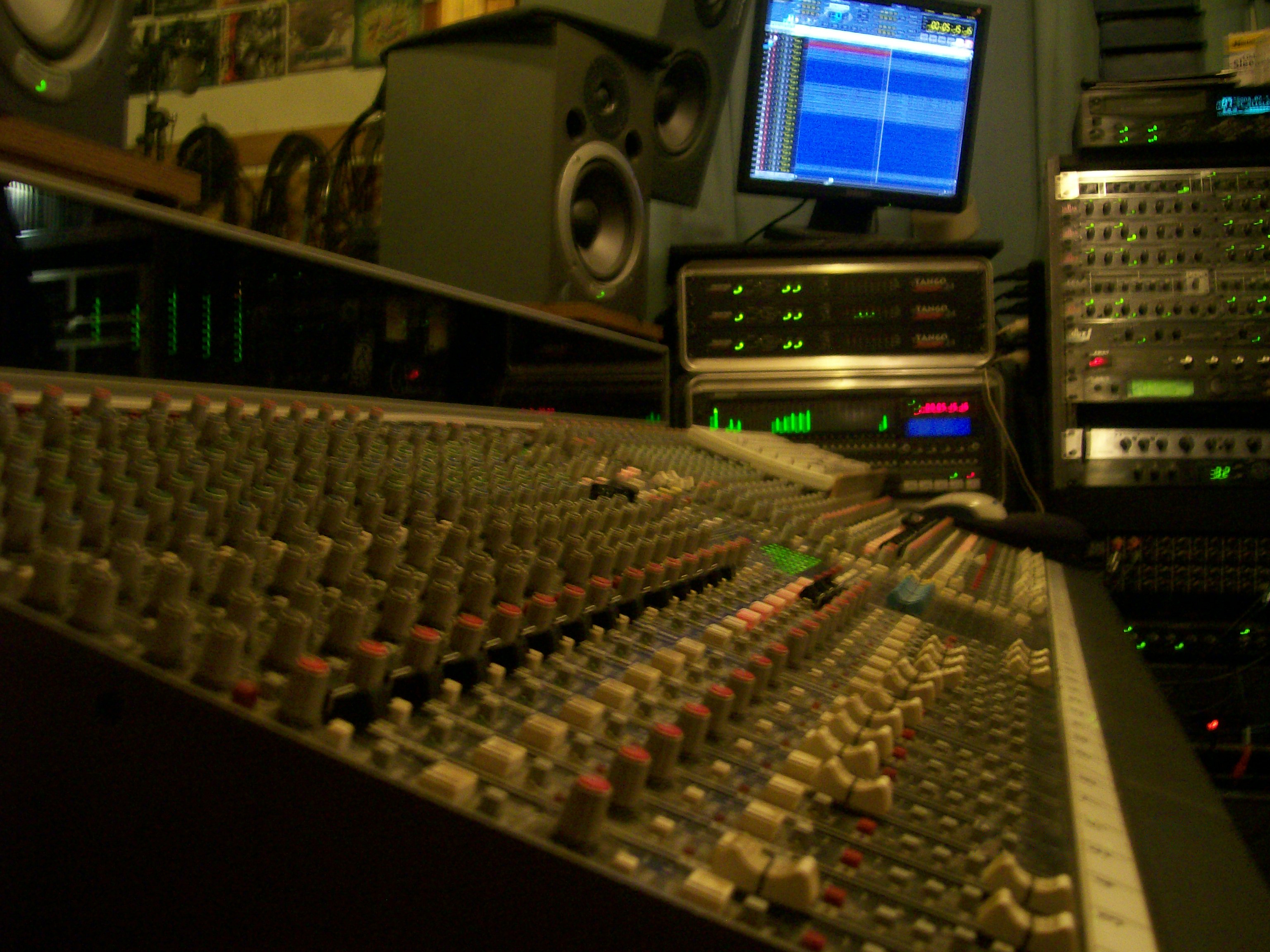
Mixing station

== Discography ==
Year	Title	Artist
1999	Further Efforts	STEMM
2001	...For the Kids	Gym Class Heroes
2001	Friday Night Knife Fight	Kid Gorgeous
2001	Dead to Me	STEMM
2002	Forever Scorned	It Dies Today
2006	Sleepaway	Sleepaway
2006	As Cruel as School Children	Gym Class Heroes
2007	Our Puzzling Encounters Considered	Psyopus
2007	Resplendent Locution	Gaylord
2009	Odd Senses	Psyopus
2009	Evolution Through Revolution	Brutal Truth
2015	Polemic	Contrarian
2017	To Perceive Is To Suffer	Contrarian
