= If You Don't Have Anything Nice to Say... =

Studio album by The Bunny the Bear
- Released: June 28, 2011
- Genre: Post-hardcore, metalcore, electronicore, synthpop, experimental rock
- Length: 41:11
- Label: Victory
- Producer: Doug White, Alan Douches

The Bunny the Bear chronology
The Bunny the Bear (2010)	If You Don't Have Anything Nice to Say... (2011)	The Stomach for It (2012)

Singles from If You Don't Have Anything Nice to Say...
- 1. "Aisle" Released: December 15, 2010; 2. "C'est Pas Si Loin" Released: October 10, 2011; 3. "Ocean Floor" Released: October 18, 2011

Professional ratings
Review scores
Source	Rating
Alter the Press!	2.5/5
Sea of Tranquility	3/5 stars
Rock Freaks	1/10

If You Don't Have Anything Nice to Say... is the second studio album by post-hardcore band the Bunny the Bear, released through Victory Records on June 28, 2011. It peaked at number 34 on the Billboard Top Heatseekers chart.

The album's lead single "Aisle" was independently released in December 2010, and caught the attention of Victory Records, which signed the band shortly after. The album spawned a dual single in October 2011 featuring the tracks "Ocean Floor" and "C'est Pas Si Loin", both released with accompanying music videos. "Aisle" remains the band's most well-known song, as of December 2015, with over a million views on YouTube.

The tracks "Prelude to Pregnancy" and "Lust Touch Seed" were rerecorded from the band's 2010 debut album The Bunny The Bear.

== Track listing ==
No.	Title	Length
1.	"Prelude to Pregnancy"	0:58
2.	"Aisle"	4:15
3.	"Ocean Floor"	3:31
4.	"C'est Pas Si Loin"	3:28
5.	"It's a Long Way from the Esophagus to the Ovaries"	3:18
6.	"Lust Touch Seed"	4:18
7.	"396.17"	3:13
8.	"Rough Eyes"	4:13
9.	"Sympathy for the Queen of Lies"	4:28
10.	"Alley"	3:48
11.	"Path"	5:41
Total length:		41:11

== Chart performance ==
Chart (2011)	Peak position
US Billboard Top Heatseekers	34

== Personnel ==
=== The Bunny the Bear ===
- Chris "The Bear" Hutka – clean vocals
- Matthew "The Bunny" Tybor – unclean vocals, songwriting, lyrics
- Erik Kogut – guitars
- Amber Kogut – guitars
- Derek Anthony – bass
- Brian Dietz – drums, percussion

=== Additional ===
- Doug White – additional guitars, producing
- Alan Douches – mastering
- Natalie Oyler-Lusco – composition of synthesizers and piano on "C'est Pas Si Loin"
- Seth Cooper – additional vocals on "Rough Eyes"
- Jessica Steward – additional vocals on "Sympathy for the Queen of Lies"
