= Kid Gorgeous =

US musical group

- Origin: Buffalo, New York, U.S.
- Genres: Metalcore
- Years active: 1998-2003, 2010-2012
- Labels: Eulogy Recordings, Uprising, Redstar
- Members: Erik Boccio; Stephen Micciche; Jesse Muscato; Gene Zdybowicz; Aaron Ratajczk
- Past members: John McCarthy; Ryan Beseker; Donnie Lewinski; Justin Cuviello; Ryan Besch; John Angelo; Mike Leahy
- Website: Kid Gorgeous on Myspace

Kid Gorgeous is an American metalcore band from Buffalo, New York, United States. The group features a conglomerate mix of members from past and current bands Buried Alive (band), Every Time I Die and Anterrabae. Their first album, Friday Night Knife Fight, was released in May 2001. Their second studio album, This Feeling Gets Old, came out in June 2003. Both efforts were released on Southern California indie label Uprising Records. The band originally called it quits in 2003 with their last show being with Snapcase and Every Time I Die in November of that year. With a couple one-off reunion shows since then, the band has recently resurfaced with news in March 2010 that they were going to record and tour briefly in the summer. The band started recording an EP in December 2010 at GCR Audio in Buffalo, New York with Jay Zubricky and debuted two of the songs at their show with Every Time I Die on December 29, 2010. Subsequently, on December 30, 2010, the band released the song "Mermaid With A Switchblade" via their Facebook and Myspace pages. On February 1, 2012, Eulogy Recordings announced that it will be releasing the EP titled "Blue Romance" which includes three new tracks, a re-recorded classic, and a cover on June 5, 2012. It was announced via the band's Twitter and Facebook pages that Every Time I Die frontman Keith Buckley has lent vocals to a cover of Judas Priest's "Living After Midnight" which will be a bonus track on the EP.

== Career ==
The band was established in 1998 by John McCarthy, Kale McNanney, Donnie Lewinski and Stephen Micciche, taking their name from The Simpsons character Moe Szyslak's boxing name when he was young. From their inception, they played numerous shows around the Buffalo, New York and Toronto, Ontario area, including both Buffalo bands Buried Alive (band) and Every Time I Die's first shows. Enlisting original drummer Donnie Lewinski, vocalist Ryan Beseker, and rounded out by bassist Justin Cuviello, they were soon picked up by the now defunct Redstar Records out of Hamilton, Ontario. Their first recording was a track on Redstar Records' The Sound and the Fury CD compilation, released in October 1999, which included such bands as Chokehold and Every Time I Die.

Numerous line-up changes ensued shortly after that, with the addition of vocalist Erik Boccio and former Buried Alive (band) drummer Jesse Muscato. In 2000, the band teamed up with fellow Buffalo band, Dead to the World, for a split CDEP put out by Redstar Records that contained 5 songs from each band. That along with increased exposure led to the group getting signed to Uprising Records and producing their debut album, Friday Night Knife Fight. at Watchmen Recording Studios in Lockport, NY by Doug White. With the release of that record, the band set out on an East Coast tour in the Summer of 2001. Departure of bassist Justin Cuviello brought on fellow friend Mike Leahy to take over bass duties in 2002. With that brought a string of tours and shows with band and fellow label mates 7 Angels 7 Plagues, The Judas Cradle and festivals such as Furnace Fest in Birmingham, Alabama, and Texas Terror Fest. It was right around this time when guitarist Stephen Micciche started touring with Every Time I Die and eventually playing bass with them full-time, thus resulting in him resigning.

The band continued on and wrote and recorded their second album, This Feeling Gets Old, at Atomic Studios in New York and released it in 2003. Following that release, the band toured with the support of Buffalo band Asherah. Shortly after, with numerous member changes and other interests taking its toll, the group disbanded. Vocalist Erik Boccio went on to join the group Anterrabae

After a seven-year hiatus, the group has reformed and did a 10-day East Coast tour including shows with To Speak Of Wolves. On February 1, 2012, Eulogy Recordings announced that they will be releasing the five song effort titled "Blue Romance" in the Spring of 2012 with an exact release date on June 5, 2012. On June 4, 2012, the band made a stream available of their cover of "Living After Midnight" by Judas Priest on their Facebook page. Guest vocals were lent out by Keith Buckley of Every Time I Die and Ryan Caprio who fronted ex punk bands Esperanto and The Budgets.

== Band members ==
Current

- Erik Boccio – vocals (1999–2012)
- Stephen Micciche – guitar (1998–2002, 2010–2012)
- Gene Zdybowicz – guitar (2010–2012)
- Aaron Ratajczak – bass (2010–2012)
- Jesse Muscato – drums (2000–2012)

== Discography ==
Title	Year	Label
The Sound and the Fury	1999	Redstar Records
Dead to the World/Kid Gorgeous split CD	2000	Redstar Records
Friday Night Knife Fight	2001	Uprising Records
This Feeling Gets Old	2003	Uprising Records
"Blue Romance EP"	2012	Eulogy Recordings

== Music videos ==
- "Locked and Loaded, Jack" (2011)
- "Suicide Solves Everything" (2012)
