= The Bunny the Bear =

American post-hardcore rock band

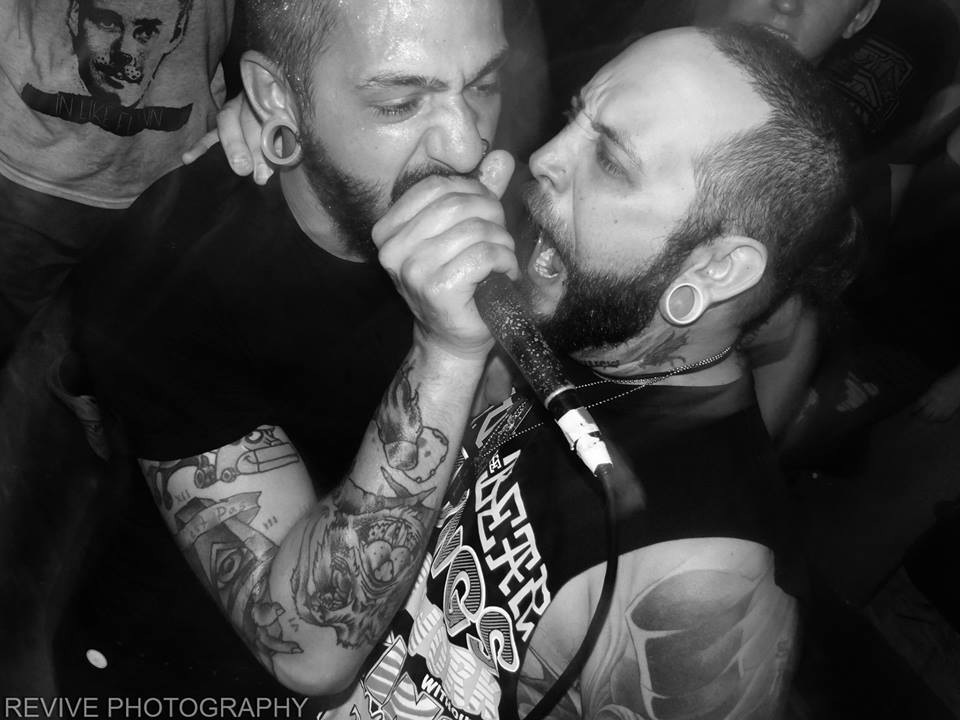
- An unmasked Matthew Tybor (left) performing live in Peoria, IL in 2013.

Background information
- Origin: Buffalo, New York
- Genres: Post-hardcore; metalcore; electronicore; synth-pop; experimental rock
- Years active: 2008–present
- Labels: Needful Things; Victory; Tough Luck Music
- Members: Matthew Tybor; Brooke Tybor
- Past members: See former members
- Website: tbtbofficial.com www.toughluckmusic.com

The Bunny the Bear is an American post-hardcore band from Buffalo, New York. The band is known for its eclectic style of post-hardcore, influenced by a variety of rock and electronic subgenres, including synthpop, metalcore, experimental rock, alternative rock, and electronica.

The Bunny the Bear was formed in 2008 by Matthew Tybor, also referred to as "The Bunny" hence the rabbit mask and persona he incorporates in the group. Tybor was quickly joined by Chris Hutka, known as "The Bear" who likewise wore a bear mask. The wearing of the bear mask has remained consistent throughout the history of fluctuating clean vocalists. In an interview, when asked about the meaning behind the band name and the masks, Tybor stated that "I'm a little weird and a little off, but it was nothing in-depth or a serious meaning behind it. It was more of a random, incoherent thought and I ran with it". The Bunny (Tybor) employs screamed vocals for the band while The Bear provides clean vocals. The band's first five albums featured Chris Hutka as The Bear. Their sixth album A Liar Wrote This features Hutka's then-replacement, Haley Roback, and their seventh album The Way We Rust features Joseph Garcia, who had toured with the band in the past.

Throughout the band's formative years and first three albums, they failed to maintain a consistent lineup, cycling through ten different instrumentalists up to the release of The Stomach for It. For the recording of their fourth album Stories, they worked with studio musicians Doug White, a guitarist and the owner of Watchmen Recording Studios and Matt McGinley, the current drummer of Gym Class Heroes. The duo would work with Tybor for the band's following two albums Food Chain and A Liar Wrote This. In 2012, Tybor reduced the band's membership to two vocalists, and he began touring with regularly-changing touring musicians. The project's original clean vocalist Chris Hutka had maintained a fluctuating relationship with Tybor and the rest of the band, departing three different times: once for a short time in 2012 following the release of The Stomach for It, the second time in 2013 shortly after the release of Stories, and a final time in late 2014. Hutka was featured on all of the band's releases before his final departure.

To date, The Bunny the Bear has released nine studio albums and two EPs. Tybor, being the only consistent member, writes all of the music and lyrics.

== History ==
=== The Bunny the Bear and If You Don't Have Anything Nice to Say... (2010–2011) ===
The Bunny the Bear self-released their self-titled debut album on February 4, 2010. They released a music video for the song entitled "April 11" on June 8, 2010. In December 2010, the band released a music video for a new demo song called "Aisle." The music video caught the attention of independent music label Victory Records, who signed the band in 2011. The band's album, If You Don't Have Anything Nice to Say..., was released on June 28, 2011. The band has toured with various artists such as Funeral for a Friend, Escape the Fate, The Amity Affliction, and label mates Victorian Halls to promote the release of If You Don't Have Anything Nice to Say. The band toured with Blood on the Dance Floor, Brokencyde, Deuce and others on the "Fight To Unite" tour.

=== The Stomach for It and Stories (2012–2013) ===
The group's third studio album entitled The Stomach for It was announced during March 2012. The album was released on May 22, 2012, from Victory Records, with pre-ordering available weeks earlier. They have released two singles from that album entitled "Lonely" and "Soul", the latter released as a lyric video instead of a music video.

Shortly after the publication of The Stomach for It, Hutka left the band for unknown reasons and was temporarily replaced by Chris Paterson, the former vocalist of Jamie's Elsewhere. Paterson did not record any music with the band and only appeared in a few live performances. Hutka returned to the band shortly after.

In February 2013 The Bunny the Bear announced their fourth studio album entitled Stories for April 16, 2013, from Victory Records. The duo, ditching efforts to maintain a full band lineup, recruited two dedicated studio musicians: guitarist and producer Doug White and drummer Matt McGinley, both of whom had worked with the rap rock band Gym Class Heroes. White had been employed by Tybor as a producer on the project's previous two albums and recorded guitars on Tybor's side project A Liar Wrote This Symphony.

Tybor recorded the bass guitar parts for the album. J.C. Maçek III of PopMatters said in a positive review of the album, "The overall impact of The Bunny the Bear’s Stories is that of a well-unified whole that might alienate as many listeners as it entices, for many of the same reasons." The band began performing with a touring band following the album's release.

The band released two singles from Stories entitled "In Like Flynn" and "Another Day." They have released music videos for "In Like Flynn" and "Sadie" thus far, as well as a lyric video for "Another Day."

On May 19, 2013, Matt Tybor announced on The Bunny the Bear Facebook page that Hutka had departed from the band due to ongoing battles with drug addiction. A couple of days later it was announced that Joseph Garcia, the former singer of the progressive metal band I, Omega had been chosen as Hutka's replacement, although Garcia only remained in the band for a brief period, as Hutka rejoined the band in November 2013. Their song "In Like Flynn" won music video of the year on Victory Records in 2013.

=== Food Chain and third departure of Hutka (2014–2015) ===
Somewhere in late December, the band posted videos on their Facebook showing them in the studio performing new unheard songs. In January 2014, the band announced their fifth studio album would be released in stores on March 18 through Victory Records. Shortly after the announcement was made, the band hit the road on a headlining tour with support from Jose Garzon.

The band released the first single off Food Chain entitled "High Tides and Swimming Conditions" on February 11, 2014.

In February, the band announced on their Facebook that they would be supporting Mindless Self Indulgence on the American leg of "How I Learned to Stop Giving a Shit and Love Mindless Self Indulgence Tour 2014" in March, in support of the new album. On March 6 the band premiered their music video for "First Met You" via their YouTube. On March 18, the album Food Chain was released. On April 14, 2014, another music video was premiered on YouTube for the song "Skyscrapers."

On November 19, Chris Hutka announced on Facebook his third departure from the band due to ongoing disagreements with other band members, in addition to focusing on family life as well as a potential solo career. Shortly after, Tybor replaced Hutka with a friend, Haley Roback, who began touring with the group. It has been stated by many of the groups touring musicians that Hutka's struggle with addiction was the primary source of turbulence throughout his time in the band. Tybor has since kept out of headlines in regards to commenting in any substantial detail on Hutka's parting.

=== A Liar Wrote This and departure of Roback (2015–2016) ===
On May 5, 2015, they finished recording their upcoming album. The following month, the band's sixth album A Liar Wrote This was announced, set for release on July 24, 2015. The album was the first full-length release by the band without Chris Hutka acting as The Bear.

A re-recorded version of "It's Not Always Cold in Buffalo" (originally on Stories) was released on May 25, 2015, with an accompanying music video. The track featured on the band's sixth album. The album's first single "Lover's Touch" was released on June 16, 2015. "Lover's Touch" is the first original release by the band without Chris Hutka. On July 24, A Liar Wrote This was released.

The band left Victory Records shortly after the release of A Liar Wrote This.

On December 20, 2015, Roback had announced that she had become pregnant and would not be performing with the band on their upcoming 2016 tour. Tybor then replaced Roback with Joseph Garcia, who had toured with the band in 2013 coinciding with Hutka's second departure. On January 23, 2016, Roback stated on Facebook that she would not be returning to The Bunny the Bear; touring or otherwise. Tybor has since stated the same.

=== Return and second departure of Joseph Garcia, The Way We Rust, and Afterglow (2016–present) ===
On February 11, Tybor announced on Facebook that a remastered edition of the band's debut album The Bunny the Bear would be released on April 11, 2016.

Shortly after Tybor released Where It Began, which is a compilation of unreleased demos from 2008. Tybor also released two "rarities" albums throughout late 2016, featuring more unreleased TBTB demos as well as songs from his various side projects.

On January 10, 2017, the band announced that they had signed to Needful Things (a label distributed by Tragic Hero Records). Coinciding with this, their seventh studio album entitled The Way We Rust was formally announced, scheduled for release on March 17, which will feature vocals performed by Joseph Garcia. This marks the longest gap of time between albums, making 2016 the first year since their debut without a release from the band. The album's first single, titled "Love Lies," was released on the same day as the announcement.

As of July 19, 2017, Joseph announced that he was quitting the band to pursue a full time career of producing. He was replaced by Jake Reeves, who served as the fifth iteration of "The Bear" until 2024.

On March 2, 2018, the band's new single "Let Go" was released alongside a music video. The band then released a subsequent EP, You Have to Die a Few Times on April 27.

On September 19, 2020, the band posted a video on Twitter of the band in the studio recording vocals for an upcoming cover of "In the End" by Linkin Park. On October 9, the band released their eighth studio album Afterglow, which contains songs from the You Have To Die A Few Times EP. On October 24, the band's cover of "In the End" was released on the compilation album Hybrid Theory: An Encore to celebrate the original album's 20th anniversary.

On July 10, 2021, Tybor announced via the band's official Facebook and Instagram pages that former member Chris Hutka had died. The cause of his death remains unclear.

== Side projects ==
Throughout the course of The Bunny the Bear's existence, Tybor has been involved in a variety of side projects.

In 2012, Tybor formed a short-lived side project called "A Liar Wrote This Symphony," featuring himself on vocals, Doug White on guitar, and Val Hill on drums. The project featured a more lush and symphonic sound than The Bunny the Bear at the time; this sound would eventually influence Tybor's future recordings with The Bunny the Bear. Five of the project's demos were re-recorded as The Bunny the Bear Tracks: Somewhat Standards, Lover's Touch, Curtain Call, Motions and Sleep Sequence (from A Liar Wrote This). A Liar Wrote This Symphony has not been active since 2012, shortly after its formation.

Also in 2012, Tybor created a solo project called "Ovaries," which featured a darker electronicore sound that would later be heard on The Bunny the Bear's fifth album, Food Chain. Ovaries released four demos titled "Food Chain," "Logic," "Secrets," "The Butcher, My Bride," and "The Melody The Memory." "Food Chain" was later re-recorded for the album of the same name. Likewise, Ovaries has not been active since 2012.

In 2014, Tybor and White formed a new project called "When Wild Dingos Attack," featuring an aggressive metalcore and grindcore-influenced sound. When Wild Dingos Attack did a limited release of a self-titled album in 2015. The project is still active, although no music has been released since their self-titled debut.

In July 2016, Tybor formed another project titled "Ramblings From the Rabbit Hole", which included himself as well as his long-time friend and poet Duke Donaldson. The project implied focus on complex lyricism. Two demo tracks have been released, titled "Gabels" and "Triggers." Tybor has stated that a debut album is almost finished.

In September 2016, Tybor announced plans to release a rarities album featuring songs from A Liar Wrote This Symphony and Ovaries, as well as some The Bunny the Bear demos.

Coinciding with his departure in November 2014, Chris Hutka stated that he would be focusing on a solo project, and on December 10, 2016, Hutka announced that he will be in the studio recording his new LP in February 2017.

In June 2018, Tybor created an alt pop musical project called Prblms with producer and singer/ songwriter Anthony Todorov (also known as Artemis). The duo released Prblms debut single titled 'prison' which reached over 1 million streams on Spotify within 3 months. To capitalize on the success of their first single, Tybor and Todorov teamed up with film producer, Andrew Colton, to film a music video. Tybor and Anthony went on to release four more singles as prblms titled Tr4$h Talk, Ghosts, Sucks Without U and Pushing Daisies.

As of July 2023 Prblms has amassed over 6.3 million streams on Spotify.

== Band members ==
=== Current ===
- Matthew "The Bunny" Tybor — unclean vocals, songwriter (2008–present), additional clean vocals, studio bass guitar (2013–present)
- Brooke "The Bear 6.0" Tybor — clean vocals (2024–present)

=== Studio ===
- Doug White – guitar and production (2013–present)
- Mike Novak – drums (2012)
- Matt McGinley – drums (2013–present)

=== Touring ===
- Chris Vazquez — bass (2023–present)
- Justin DiMaria — drums (2024–present)
- Jeff Pennachio — guitar (2025–present)

=== Former ===
- Chris "The Bear" Hutka — clean vocals (2008–2012, 2013, 2014; died 2021 )
- Chris "The Bear 2.0" Paterson — clean vocals (2012, 2024)
- Joseph "The Bear 3.0" Garcia — clean vocals (2013, 2016–2017, 2024)
- Haley "The Bear 4.0" Roback — clean vocals (2015)
- Jake "The Bear 5.0" Reeves — clean vocals (2017–2024)
- Mike Toczek Jr. — guitar (2008–2009)
- Chris Cole — guitar (2009–2010)
- Erik Kogut — guitar (2009–2011)
- Amber Kogut — guitar, backing vocals (2011)
- Danny Stillman — guitars, keyboards, programming, triggers, vocals (2011)
- Nate Blasdell — guitar (2014–2015)
- Mike Rizzuto — guitar (2015–2024)
- Gage Way — guitar (2018) (not on timeline)
- Steven Drachenberg — bass (2008–2009, 2011–2012, 2016; died 2022)
- Derek Anthony — bass (2009–2011)
- Jose Garzon — bass (2014)
- Rob Weston — bass (2014–2015)
- Jim Kaczmarski — drums (2008–2010)
- Matt Trozzi — drums (2011–2012, 2014–2015)
- Zack Lee — drums (2012)
- Tommy Roulette Vinton — drums (2012–2014)
- Jae Segatto — drums (2013)
- Alex Matos — guitar (2011–2014)
- Jonathan Quick — guitar (2012–2013)
- Danny Case — guitar (2014–2015)
- Joey Galligan — drums (2016–2024)
- Kane Buckley — guitar (2016–2018)
- Adam Seitz — bass (2017–2021)

== Discography ==
The Bunny The Bear discography
- Studio albums: 8
- Extended plays: 2
- Singles: 13

Studio albums

Year	Album	Chart positions
Year	Album	US Heat
2010	The Bunny the Bear: Release date: February 4, 2010; Label: Self-released; Format: Compact disc, digital download, vinyl, Reissue	
2011	If You Don't Have Anything Nice to Say...: Release date: June 28, 2011; Label: Victory Records; Format: Compact Disc, digital download	34
2012	The Stomach for It: Release date: May 22, 2012; Label: Victory Records; Format: Compact Disc, digital download	21
2013	Stories: Release date: April 16, 2013; Label: Victory Records; Format: Compact Disc, digital download	24
2014	Food Chain: Release date: March 18, 2014; Label: Victory Records; Format: Compact Disc, digital download	15
2015	A Liar Wrote This: Release date: July 24, 2015; Label: Victory Records; Format: Compact Disc, digital download	
2017	The Way We Rust: Release date: March 17, 2017; Label: Needful Things; Format: Compact Disc, digital download	
2020	Afterglow: Release date: October 9, 2020; Label: Ghost Killer Entertainment; Format: Compact Disc, Digital download	
2025	The Moments That Cost: Release date: May 9, 2025; Label: Tough Luck Music; Format: Compact Disc, Digital download	

EPs

Year	Album details
2008	Where It Began: Released: April 11, 2008; Label: Self-released; Format: Digital download, Vinyl
2014	Acoustic EP: Released: March 18, 2014; Label: Victory Records; Format: Compact Disc, Digital download
2018	You Have To Die A Few Times: Released: April 27, 2018; Label: Tough Luck Music
2024	That's a Shame: Released: October 11, 2024; Label: Tough Luck Music; Format: Digital download
2025	Sink: Released: January 17, 2025; Label: Tough Luck Music; Format: Digital download

== Videography ==
- “April 11” (2010)
- “Aisle” (2010)
- “Ocean Floor” (2011)
- “C'est Pas Si Loin” (2011)
- “Lonely” (2012)
- “Soul” (lyric video) (2012)
- “In Like Flynn” (2013)
- “Another Day” (lyric video) (2013)
- “Sadie” (2013)
- “High Tides and Swimming Conditions” (lyric video) (2014)
- “First Met You” (2014)
- “Skyscrapers” (2014)
- “The Seeds We Sow” (2014)
- “It's Not Always Cold in Buffalo” (revisited) (2015)
- “Lover's Touch” (2015)
- “Love Lies” (2017)
- “I Am Free” (2017)
- “Let Go” (2018)
- “Visions” (2019)
- “In The Feels” (2024)
- “66Sick” (2025)
- “Aisle Redux” (2025)
