= Friday Night Knife Fight =

Studio album by Kid Gorgeous
- Released: May 22nd, 2001
- Recorded: January, 2001, Watchmen Recording Studios
- Genre: Metalcore
- Length: 26:21
- Label: Uprising Records
- Producer: Doug White

Kid Gorgeous chronology
Friday Night Knife Fight (2001)	This Feeling Gets Old (2003)

Professional ratings
Review scores
Source	Rating
Allmusic	3/5 stars

Friday Night Knife Fight is the debut album by metalcore band Kid Gorgeous released in 2001 on Uprising Records.

== Track listing ==
1. "Love Song" – 3:21
2. "Paying the Butcher In Diamonds" – 3:12
3. "Kerosene Smile" – 2:44
4. "Friday Night Knife Fight" – 1:27
5. "The Frank Sinatra Blues" – 3:19
6. "Because the Ceiling Was Too Low" – 2:38
7. "Feeding Off the Misfortune of Others" – 3:16
8. "Blades" – 1:56
9. "And the Headlines Muttered Dirt" – 2:26
10. "I Hate Kid Gorgeous" – 1:53

== Personnel ==
- John McCarthy - Guitar
- Erik Boccio - Vocals
- Stephen Micciche - Guitar
- Jesse Muscato - Drums
- Justin Cuviello - Bass
