= Sirens (It Dies Today album) =

2006 studio album by It Dies Today

Studio album by It Dies Today
- Released: October 17, 2006
- Genre: Metalcore
- Length: 38:41
- Label: Trustkill
- Producer: GGGarth

It Dies Today chronology
The Caitiff Choir (2004)	Sirens (2006)	Lividity (2009)

Sirens is the second full-length studio album by Buffalo-based metalcore band It Dies Today, released on October 17, 2006. It is the last recorded material with vocalist Nick Brooks until the band's 2023 reunion.

Sirens was leaked to peer-to-peer file-sharing programs on August 15, 2006.

Professional ratings
Review scores
Source	Rating
Allmusic	4/5 stars
Alternative Press	4/5 stars
Blabbermouth.net	6.5/10
Decoy Music	2/4 stars

== Track listing ==
All lyrics are written by Nicholas Brooks; all music is composed by Mike Hatalak.

No.	Title	Length
1.	"A Constant Reminder"	3:31
2.	"A Port in Any Storm"	3:14
3.	"The Bacchanal Affair"	3:15
4.	"Sacred Heart (Sacré Cœur)"	3:13
5.	"Sixth of June"	3:04
6.	"Reignite the Fires"	3:30
7.	"Black Bile, White Lies"	3:19
8.	"Sirens"	4:31
9.	"Through Leaves, Over Bridges"	3:56
10.	"On the Road (To Damnation)"	2:59
11.	"Turn Loose the Doves"	4:17

- "Sixth of June" is about Aileen Wuornos. In early press and on the leaked version it is referred to as "Damsel of Death". It was featured on the soundtracks of Arena Football: Road to Glory & Resident Evil: Extinction.
- "Through Leaves, Over Bridges" is about Kurt Vonnegut's "Long Walk to Forever". It imitates the story, but appears to change the ending.
- "On the Road (To Damnation)" is about the Four Horsemen of the Apocalypse.
- "Sacred Heart" was featured briefly in the film Jennifer's Body.

== Credits ==
=== Band ===
- Nick Brooks – lead vocals, co-production
- Chris Cappelli – guitar
- Mike Hatalak – guitar, co-production
- Steve Lemke – bass guitar, backing vocals
- Nick Mirusso – drums

=== Other ===
- GGGarth – production
- Ben Kaplan – production, recording
- Josh Wilbur – mixing
- Howie Weinberg – mastering
- Judah Nero – pre-production
- David Schrott – photography
- Kevin Estrada – band photography
- Sons of Nero – artwork
