= Forever Scorned =

EP by It Dies Today
- Released: August 15, 2002
- Recorded: Watchmen Recording Studios, Lockport, New York
- Genre: Metalcore
- Length: 29:21
- Label: Life Sentence
- Producer: Doug White

It Dies Today chronology
Let the Angels Whisper Your Name (2001)	Forever Scorned (2002)	The Caitiff Choir (2004)

Forever Scorned is the debut EP released by the metalcore band It Dies Today in 2002. It was recorded, mixed, and mastered in May 2002 at Watchmen Recording Studios. It was re-recorded and re-released in 2005 with a different cover.

== Track listing ==
No.	Title	Length
1.	"Sentiments of You"	4:37
2.	"Bridges Left Burning"	4:08
3.	"The Requiem for Broken Hearts"	5:38
4.	"Forever Scorned"	3:55
5.	"Blood Stained Bed Sheet Burden"	5:32
6.	"A Romance by the Wings of Icarus"	5:31

== Personnel ==
It Dies Today

- Nick Brooks – vocals
- Chris Cappelli – guitar
- Steve Lemke – guitar
- Seth Thompson – bass
- Jimmy Revson – drums

Additional

- Adam Stankiewicz – keyboards on "Sentiments of You"
- Doug White – engineer, mastering, mixing
- Matt Richards – artwork, layout design
