= Ideas of Reference =

Studio album by Psyopus
- Released: October 19, 2004
- Recorded: November 3–9, 2003
- Genre: Mathcore; grindcore; avant-garde metal
- Length: 43:28
- Label: Metal Blade/Black Market Activities

Psyopus chronology
3003 (demo) (2003)	Ideas of Reference (2004)	Our Puzzling Encounters Considered (2007)

Professional ratings
Review scores
Source	Rating
Scene Point Blank	(9.0/10)
Punknews	4.5/5 stars

Ideas of Reference is the debut album by Psyopus, released on October 19, 2004.

== Track listing ==
1. "Mork and Mindy (Daydream Lover)" – 3:56
2. "The White Light" – 3:22
3. "Death, I..." – 4:58
4. "The Long Road to the 4th Dimension" – 4:06
5. "Mannequin" – 2:43
6. "MirrorriM" – 2:51
7. "Imogen's Puzzle" – 1:59
8. "Anomaly" – 3:39
9. "Bones to Dust" (silence from 4:23 to 7:30, and then hidden track) – 15:39

== Personnel ==
- Adam Frapolli - Vocals
- Christopher Arp - Guitar
- Greg Herman - Drums
- Fred DeCoste - Bass
