= This Feeling Gets Old =

Studio album by Kid Gorgeous
- Released: June 17th, 2003
- Recorded: December, 2002, Atomic Recording Company, Brooklyn, New York.
- Genre: Metalcore
- Length: 27:00
- Label: Uprising Records

Kid Gorgeous chronology
Friday Night Knife Fight (2001)	This Feeling Gets Old (2003)

This Feeling Gets Old is the 2nd full-length album by metalcore band Kid Gorgeous released in 2003 on Uprising Records.

== Track listing ==
1. "Anyone Ever Tell You That You Talk Too Much" – 1:59
2. "Morrissey Was Right" – 3:27
3. "I Know a Girl Names Disease" – 2:44
4. "Suicide Solves Everything" – 2:41
5. "(Intermission)" – 0:57
6. "For Those Who Have Trouble Breaking Glass" – 3:19
7. "Rather Touch Than Talk" – 2:48
8. "My Life as a Bridge" – 6:12
9. "I Hate Myself and I Want to Die (Nirvana Cover)" – 3:23
10. "Untitiled" – 2:51

== Personnel ==
- John McCarthy - Guitar
- Erik Boccio - Vocals
- Jesse Muscato - Drums
- Ryan Besch - Bass
