= Lemuria (American band) =

American rock band

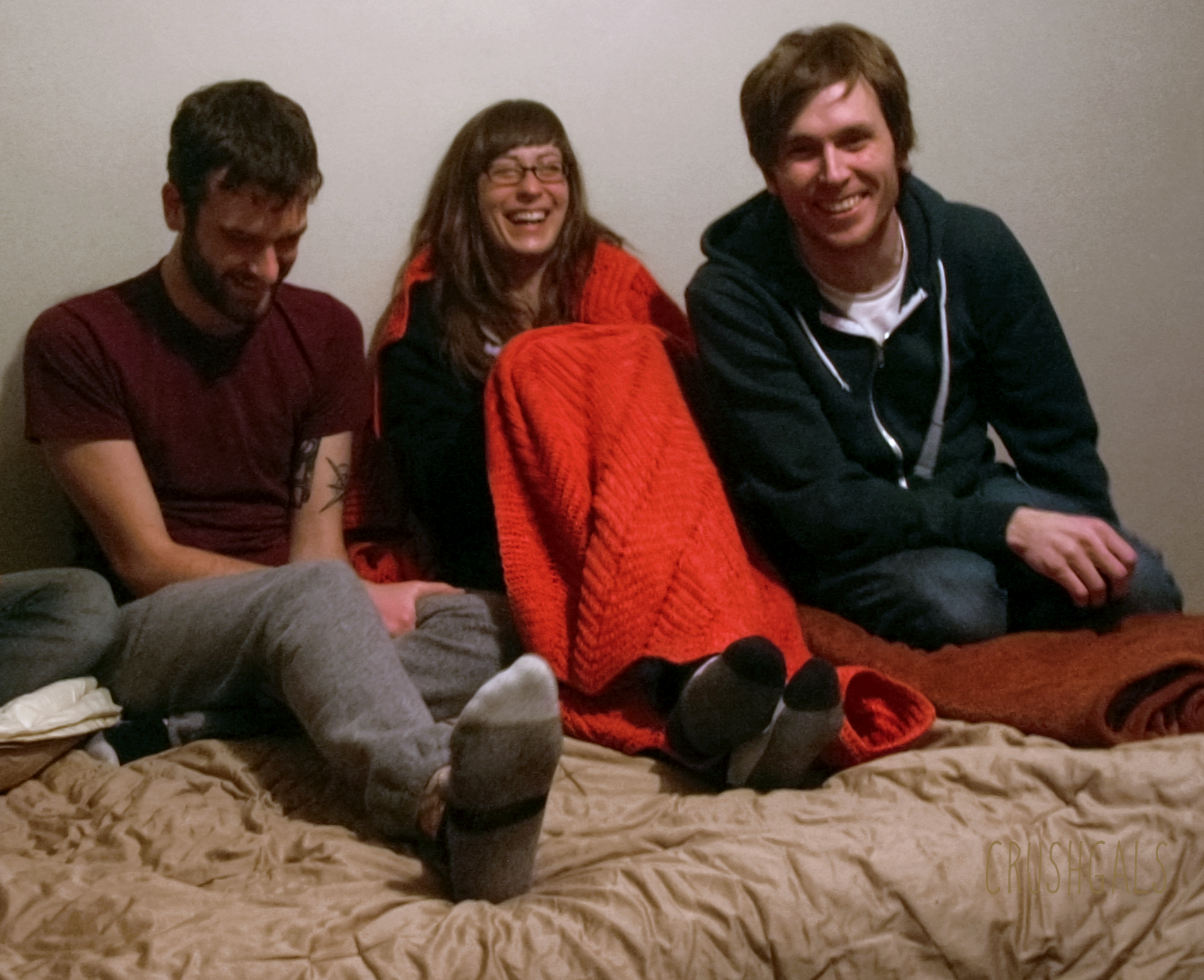

Background information
- Origin: Buffalo, New York, U.S.
- Genres: Indie rock, punk rock, emo, power pop
- Years active: 2004–2018
- Labels: Asian Man, Bridge 9, Art of the Underground, Big Scary Monsters (EU)
- Past members: Sheena Ozzella; Alex Kerns; Max Gregor; Tony Flaminio; Kyle Paton; Jason Draper; Adam Vernick

Lemuria was an American rock band formed in 2004 and originally based in Buffalo, New York. After a series of singles and EPs, Lemuria released albums between 2007 and 2017, and toured both the U.S. and internationally. The band's most recent effort, "Recreational Hate", was recorded by four-time Grammy award-winning producer/engineer Chris Shaw and released on the band's own record label, Turbo Worldwide, licensed through Asian Man Records in the U.S. and Big Scary Monsters in the U.K. The album was announced December 11, 2017, and was simultaneously received by many of the band's fans as a result of a "secret LP" placed for sale on their website months prior. "Recreational Hate" was made available digitally in December 2017, with physical copies released in February 2018.

Lemuria have cited numerous bands as influences, including Jawbox, the Lemonheads, Superchunk, Leatherface, Thin Lizzy, Archers of Loaf, Texas Is the Reason, Fleetwood Mac, and Pixies.

== History ==
=== 2004–2009 ===
Lemuria was first established in the summer of 2004 by drummer/vocalist Alex Kerns, guitarist/vocalist Sheena Ozzella, and bassist Adam Vernick. The trio began writing songs and released a five-song demo, recorded at Watchmen Recording Studios, which started a long-term relationship with engineer Doug White. After a handful of shows, and the release of the (now rare) Lemuria demo, the group parted ways with Vernick, and in March 2005, Jason Draper stepped in to join on bass.

The line-up of Lemuria featuring Alex, Sheena, and Jason went on to record many singles, splits, and 7" records. The majority of the early releases, including the demo, s/t 7", Lemuria/Frame split, Art of the Underground Single Series, and "You're Living Rooms All Over Me", were all released (or co-released) by Art Of The Underground, an indie record label owned and operated by Alex Kerns.

In 2007, after years of touring, the band remarked that never recording a full-length album had given them time "to grow and to "find our sound."" The band once again returned to Watchmen Recording Studios and began working on their first record, later titled Get Better and released on Asian Man Records. Lyrically, with the exception of the songs written by Sheena and Jason, the album took a much darker tone than previous works, as many of Alex Kern's lyrics were written dealing with the recent death of his father. Musically, however, the songs were bright and 'uplifting' as a result of the band and Alex's attitude. All these things led to and helped in titling the record Get Better.

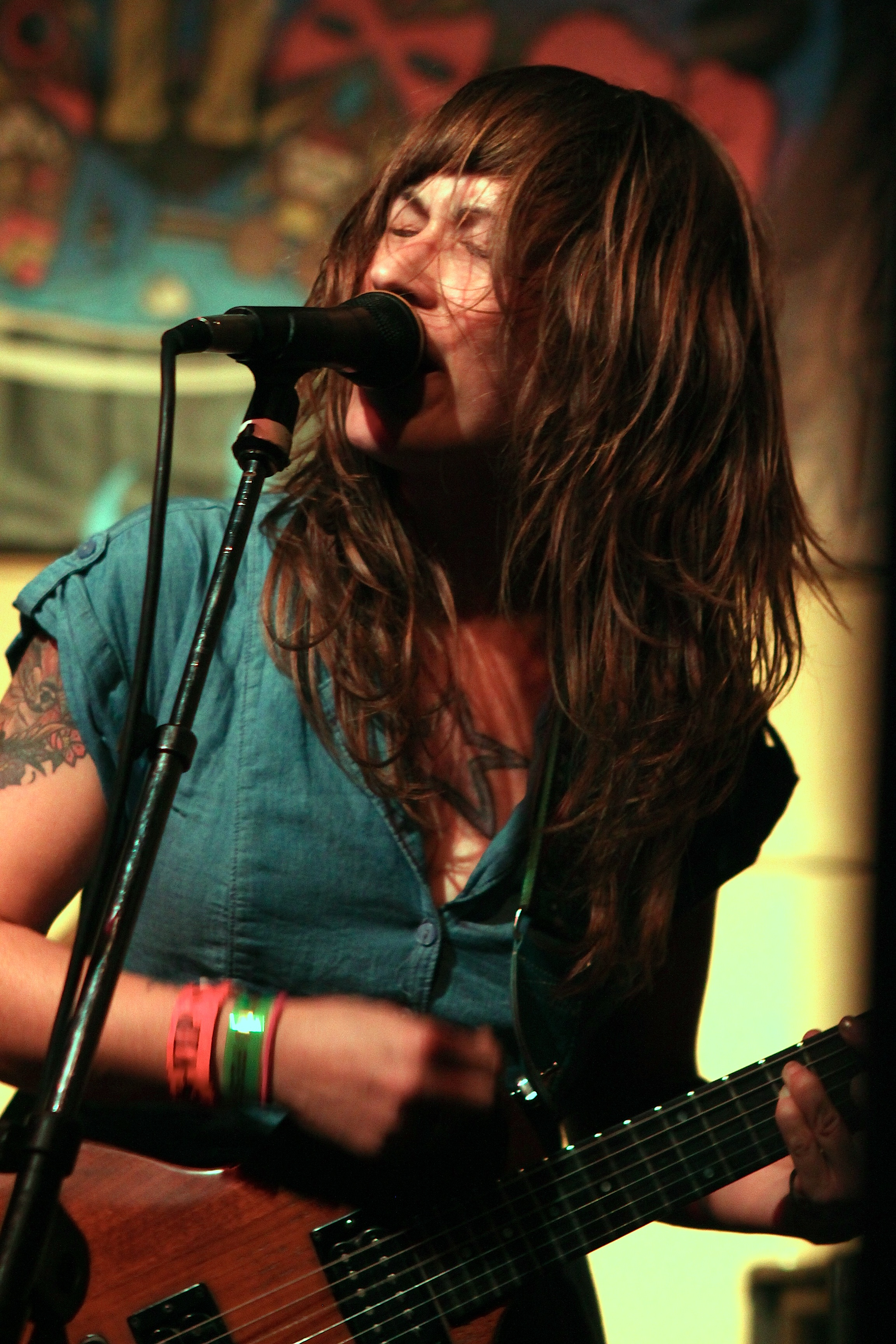
Sheena Ozzella onstage, 2012

The band began to tour on headlining bills as well as on tour packages. In the fall of 2007, Lemuria went on their first European tour, followed by the release of 'Get Better' in 2008. They continued touring throughout the US as well as Puerto Rico, the UK, and Canada in 2008, and were featured on the Asian Man Records tour alongside The Queers, Bomb the Music Industry, and Andrew Jackson Jihad. Lemuria also became a regular at the Gainesville, Florida based festival, The Fest, playing for the first time in 2006 and continuing to play every year since. When asked about their touring schedule, members of the band often express an affinity for the lifestyle:

"We're on tour a lot. It's one of the reasons we do the band. It's an excuse to travel. You go to a different city every day and show people your art."

In the fall of 2009, Alex and Sheena parted ways with Jason, who went on to concentrate on his other project, Failures' Union. Kyle Paton stepped in and the band continued to tour, though song writing became the responsibility more so of the duo of Kerns/Ozzella. The band continued to write and be active, and in April 2010 announced that they had signed to Bridge 9 Records. Signing to the Bridge 9 label, traditionally releasing albums for hardcore bands such as Agnostic Front and Slapshot, brought up many questions for both Lemuria as well as Bridge 9 as to the future of the two entities. In part, the connection to the label was due to a famous fan of Lemuria, Paramore's Hayley Williams, who had gone to see them play and connected the band with her then-boyfriend, Chad Gilbert, from New Found Glory, which had released an album on Bridge 9, according to an interview in Dying Scene.

=== 2010–2016 ===
In July, 2010, Lemuria made another big change and went in to record their debut full length for the label with J. Robbins in Baltimore, MD at Magpie Cage. However, during the mixing process of this recording session, bassist and Canadian citizen Kyle Paton ran into legal issues at the American border and as a result had to part ways with the band. In order to perform a show scheduled for later that week, Lemuria added the new bass player Max Gregor, who flew from Texas and began rehearsing in the studio. The lineup of Kerns/Ozzella/Gregor has continued to tour as well as write and record music since that time.

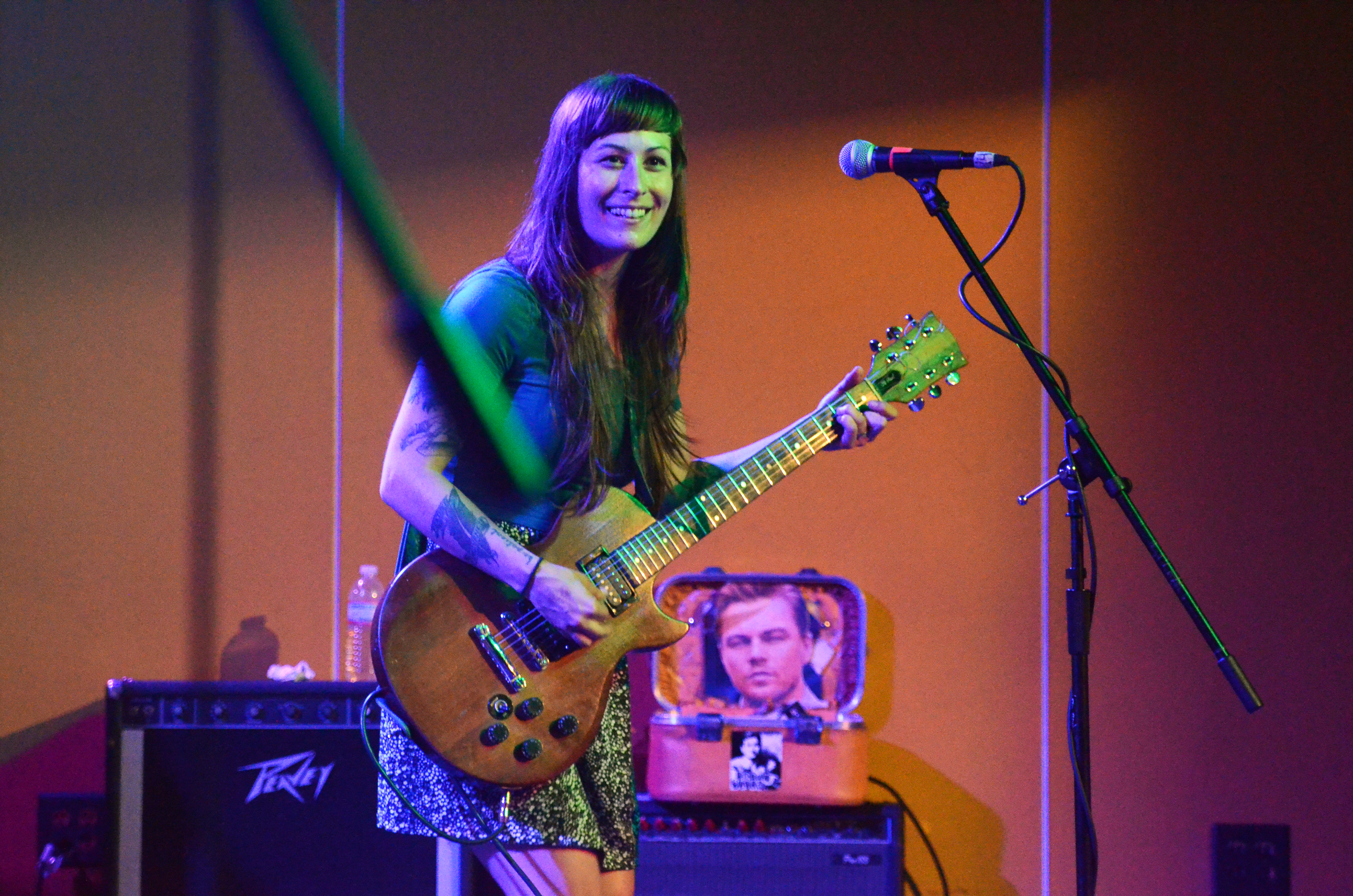
Sheena Ozzella in Raleigh, North Carolina, 2014

In early 2011, Lemuria released the digital single, "Chautauqua County", and a subsequent album, entitled "Pebble." The trio played a month of headlining shows to correspond with the release, followed by consistent shows through the year in the U.S. and Europe along with acts such as The Thermals, Screaming Females, and David Liebe Hart.

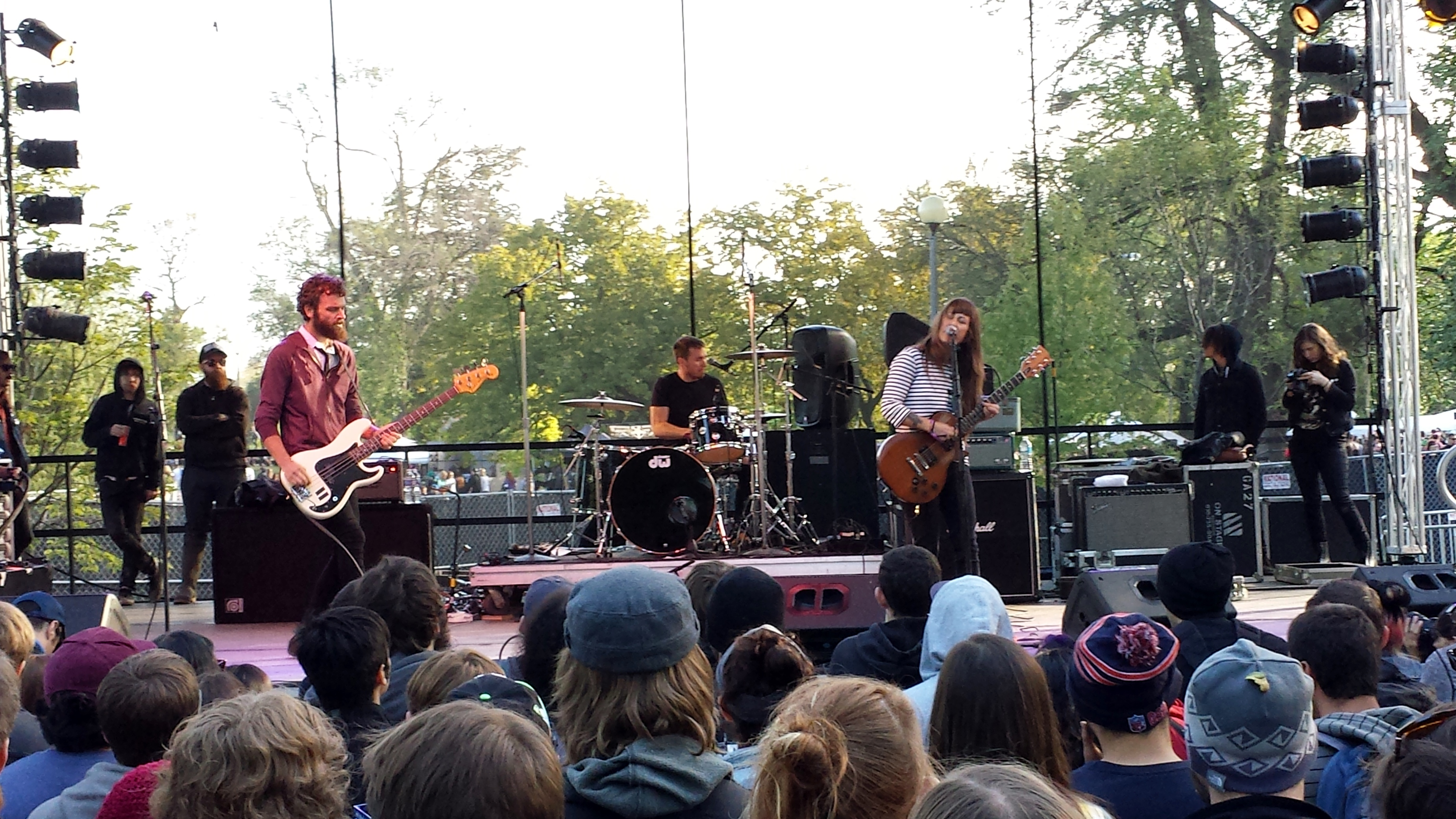
Lemuria at Riot Fest 2014

The band closed out 2012 by again recording with J. Robbins. The result became its third full-length studio album, The Distance Is So Big, released June 2013 on Bridge Nine. With the most consistent line-up in the band's career, Lemuria spent 2013 supporting "The Distance Is So Big" with shows across Canada and the U.S., including a week at Austin's SXSW festival. 2014 tours brought the band across the U.S. a few times, with a notable stop at Chicago's Riot Fest, and before crowds in Thailand, Indonesia, Australia, Malaysia and the Philippines. During this time, the band has shared the stage and tours with Ted Leo, Aimee Mann, Tigers Jaw, Kind of Like Spitting, and The Menzingers.

=== 2017–present ===
In 2017, Lemuria revisited their 2007 debut release, Get Better, with a limited reissue as well as US and UK tours performing the album from start to finish. Simultaneously, they prepared to release their latest record, "Recreational Hate", on their own label, Turbo Worldwide. The album was released in a unique way, summarized in this letter included with each order, and also posted on the band's website:

"Thanks to everyone who took a gamble and purchased the "secret LP" we put up for sale back in August. We're excited to unveil that the LP you ordered is our new studio album, "Recreational Hate". Your trust and subsequent purchase enabled us to achieve some great feats with this release, including working with the 4-time Grammy winning producer and engineer Chris Shaw. We chose to work with him, in part, for his very eclectic discography, including the Weezer "Blue" album, Bob Dylan, Leonard Cohen, Ice Cube, Wilco, Public Enemy, Modest Mouse, A Tribe Called Quest, Ween and Lou Reed. You also gave us the opportunity to launch Turbo Worldwide, our new record label and home base for all things Lemuria. As a "thank you", you are receiving the LP approximately the same time as this announcement, 2 months before the album reaches the shelves of your local record store.

A few years back, we thought it would be fun to place some very old songs (our CD-R-only demo) on an LP, and put it up for sale as a mysterious "Secret" release. Whoever bought this wouldn't know what they ordered until it arrived in the mail and they spun it on their record player. We held no expectations as to what the response would be, however it was overwhelmingly positive, and the folks who received this special item seemed to enjoy the fun and mystery as much as we did. We tried various iterations of this in years to come, and we noticed that, each time we did, it was a similar group of friends and supporters who jumped on the opportunity. It's the same group of folks who tirelessly support our shows, support our releases, and are our motivating force that inspire us to keep actualizing our passion. We don't, not even for a second, take this amount of trust and support for granted. As a thank you, when we were planning the release for "Recreational Hate", we decided to go this secretive route once again in hopes that a similar investment from you would turn into an even bigger reward of a full-length studio album.

These songs represent our next step forward. It has been a wild adventure for us to arrive to this moment of releasing the album. Thank you for traveling with us."

The band toured briefly in support of Recreational Hate, including a week opening for Jeff Rosenstock. On October 17, 2018, however, Lemuria announced that they would be cancelling their Recreational Hate fall tour with Bethlehem Steel. The band stated: "We’re unable to go on our upcoming tour...Some of us are dealing with personal matters, making touring not possible at the moment."

Lemuria has been inactive since 2018, not releasing any new music or playing any shows. Kerns and Gregor have focused on their solo careers, while Ozzella began an a cappella trio with Anika Pyle and Augusta Koch entitled Sheena, Anika and Augusta. Their EP, Simple Pleasures, was released in 2019.

== Members ==
Final line-up

- Sheena Ozzella - lead and backing vocals, guitar (2004–2018)
- Alex Kerns - lead and backing vocals, drums (2004–2018)
- Max Gregor - bass, backing vocals (2010–2018)
- Tony Flaminio - lead guitar, backing vocals (2017–2018; touring musician)

Former members

- Adam Vernick - bass, backing vocals (2004-2005)
- Jason Draper - bass, backing vocals (2005-2009)
- Kyle Paton - bass, backing vocals (2009-2010)

== Discography ==
=== Albums ===
- Get Better (Asian Man Records, 2008)
- Pebble (Bridge 9 Records, 2011)
- The Distance Is So Big (Bridge 9 Records, 2013)
- Recreational Hate (Turbo Worldwide, 2017) (Big Scary Monsters, UK & EU)

=== EPs ===
- Self Titled 7"/CD (Art of the Underground/All Things Ordinary - 2005)

=== Compilation albums ===
- The First Collection (Yo-Yo Records, Asian Man Records, 2007)
- Companion (Turbo Worldwide, 2018)

=== 7" singles and split releases ===
- "Frame" - Split 7" (2005, Art of the Underground)
- "Your Livingroom's All Over Me" - Split CD/LP with Kind of Like Spitting (2006, Art of the Underground)
- "Art of the Underground - Single Series Volume 10" 7" (2007, Art of the Underground)
- "The Ergs" - Split 7" (2007, Art of the Underground, Yo-Yo Records)
- "Ozzy" b/w "Expert Herder" - 7" (2009, Hex Records)
- "Under The Influence Volume 7" - Split 7" with Off With Their Heads (2009, Suburban Home Records)
- "Chautauqua County" b/w "They Are Who I Say They Are" - 7" (2010, Bridge 9 Records)
- "Cheap Girls" - Split 7" (2011, No Idea Records)
- "Varoom Allure" b/w "Cannonballs to Hurt" 7" (2012, Bridge 9 Records)
- "Brilliant Dancer" (2013, Bridge 9 Records)
- "Turnstile Comix #3 - 7"" (2014, Silver Sprocket)
- "Wanted to Be Yours" b/w "Utah" 7" (2017, Turbo Worldwide)

=== Music videos ===
- Wise People (2012)
- Pleaser (2012)
- Scienceless (2013)
- Oahu, Hawaii (2014)
- Brilliant Dancer (2014)
- Christine Perfect (2018)
- Kicking In (2018)

=== Compilation appearances ===
- Art of the Underground Sampler CD - Art of the Underground, 2005 (song: "Getting Over Ourselves" - from 2004 demo)
- NY vs. NJ - Crafty Records, 2007 (songs: "Beespit", "Origamists Too")
- Insubordination Fest 2008 CD/DVD - Insubordination, 2008 (song: "Mechanical" - live recording)
- Insubordination Fest 2009 CD/DVD - Insubordination, 2009 (song: "Hours" - live recording)
- IndoorShoes - Adopted Friends Vol. 1, 2010 (Song: Hours)
- Invisible Children Benefit - Robbed the Bank, 2012 (song: "Wise People")

=== Demos ===
- 2004 Demo CD (2004, self-released)
