= The Distance Is So Big =

Studio album by Lemuria
- Released: June 18, 2013
- Genre: Rock, Indie rock
- Length: 38:38
- Label: Bridge 9

Lemuria chronology
Pebble (2011)	The Distance Is So Big (2013)

Singles from The Distance Is So Big
- 1. "Brilliant Dancer" Released: May 21, 2013

Professional ratings
Aggregate scores
Source	Rating
Metacritic	72/100
Review scores
Source	Rating
Allmusic	3.5/5 stars
This Is Fake DIY	7/10

The Distance Is So Big is the third studio album from American band Lemuria. It was released in June 2013 under Bridge 9 Records.

== Track list ==
No.	Title	Length
1.	"Michael and Stephen Moon"	0:46
2.	"Brilliant Dancer"	3:12
3.	"Clay Baby"	2:25
4.	"Scienceless"	2:54
5.	"Paint the Youth"	3:05
6.	"Dream Eater"	2:49
7.	"Oahu, Hawaii"	4:40
8.	"Chihuly"	3:01
9.	"Bluffing Statistics"	3:34
10.	"Public Opinion Bath"	2:10
11.	"Congratulations Sex"	3:25
12.	"Survivors Guilt"	4:17
13.	"Ruby"	2:20
