= The Stomach for It =

Studio album by The Bunny the Bear
- Released: May 22, 2012
- Genre: Metalcore, post-hardcore, synth-pop
- Length: 38:16
- Label: Victory
- Producer: Doug White, Matthew Tybor, Alan Douches

The Bunny the Bear chronology
If You Don't Have Anything Nice to Say... (2011)	The Stomach for It (2012)	Stories (2013)

Singles from The Stomach for It
- 1. "Lonely" / "Soul" Released: April 24, 2012

The Stomach for It is the third studio album by American post-hardcore band The Bunny the Bear, released through Victory Records on May 22, 2012. The album peaked at number 21 on the Billboard Top Heatseekers chart.

The album was announced in March 2012, and a dual single was released to promote the album's release, containing the tracks "Lonely" and "Soul". The release is the last by the band with a full band lineup; the band worked with studio musicians Doug White (the album's producer) and Matt McGinley for their following three releases.

== Track listing ==
No.	Title	Length
1.	"Congregation"	1:42
2.	"Sky"	2:58
3.	"All Birds"	3:13
4.	"This Isn't Why You Made Her"	3:17
5.	"Soul"	3:32
6.	"Breeze"	3:46
7.	"Lonely"	3:35
8.	"I'm Scared Now"	3:44
9.	"Sheep"	4:09
10.	"Pieces"	4:13
11.	"It Kills Me"	4:07
Total length:		38:16

== Chart performance ==
Chart (2013)	Peak position
US Billboard Top Heatseekers	21

== Personnel ==
Credits were adapted from AllMusic.

=== The Bunny the Bear ===
- Chris "The Bear" Hutka - clean vocals
- Matthew "The Bunny" Tybor - unclean vocals, songwriting, lyrics, producing
- Cody Morse - guitar
- Steve Drachenburg - bass
- Matt Trozzi - Drums

=== Additional personnel ===
- Doug White - producing, engineering, mixing
- Alan Douches - mastering
- Don Duquette - programming
- Jake Andrews - guitar engineering
