= Food Chain (album) =

Studio album by The Bunny the Bear
- Released: March 18, 2014
- Recorded: 2013–2014 at Watchmen Recording Studios, Lockport, New York
- Genre: Experimental rock, synthpop, post-hardcore, electronicore, metalcore
- Length: 38:34
- Label: Victory
- Producer: Matthew Tybor; Doug White; Matthew McGinley; Don Duquette; Kyle Collins

The Bunny the Bear chronology
Stories (2013)	Food Chain (2014)	A Liar Wrote This (2015)

Singles from Food Chain
- 1. "High Tides and Swimming Conditions" Released: 14 February 2014; 2. "First Met You" Released: 5 March 2014; 3. "Skyscrapers" Released: 13 April 2014; 4. "The Seeds We Sow" Released: 3 November 2014

Professional ratings
Review scores
Source	Rating
AllMusic	3.5/5 stars
Alternative Press	4/5 stars

Food Chain is the fifth studio album by experimental post-hardcore band The Bunny the Bear, released through Victory Records on March 18, 2014. The album reached number 15 on the Billboard Top Heatseekers chart. It is the last album to feature founding clean vocalist Chris Hutka.

The album was announced in early 2014. The first single, "High Tides and Swimming Conditions" was released the following month with an accompanying lyric video. The album spawned three more singles, "First Met You," "Skyscrapers," and "The Seeds We Sow."

The track "Flying Like a Bird" was re-recorded from the band's 2010 debut album The Bunny The Bear. A deluxe version of the album was released as well, featuring four acoustic tracks from the band's Acoustic EP.

== Track listing ==
No.	Title	Length
1.	"Food Chain"	1:23
2.	"The Seeds We Sow"	3:56
3.	"Cancer"	4:23
4.	"Pale Green Eyes"	3:05
5.	"So Smooth, So Appealing"	3:03
6.	"A Mother’s Love"	1:40
7.	"First Met You"	3:19
8.	"Skyscrapers"	3:27
9.	"Flying Like a Bird"	3:00
10.	"High Tides and Swimming Conditions"	4:26
11.	"Lost"	6:52
Total length:		38:34

US iTunes Deluxe Edition (Acoustic EP)
No.	Title	Length
12.	"When You're Alone" (Acoustic)	3:19
13.	"Every Boy" (Acoustic)	3:53
14.	"What Shade We Make" (Acoustic)	3:43
15.	"Angel Requiem" (Acoustic)	3:19

== Chart performance ==
Chart (2014)	Peak position
US Billboard Top Heatseekers	15

== Personnel ==
=== The Bunny The Bear ===
- Matthew "The Bunny" Tybor - unclean vocals, additional clean vocals, songwriting, lyrics, bass guitar, producing
- Chris "The Bear" Hutka - clean vocals

=== Additional personnel ===
- Doug White - guitars, additional producing
- Matthew McGinley - drums, additional producing, songwriting
- Ali Lander-Shindler - album layout, photography
- Don Duquette - keyboards, keyboards producing
- Nate Blasdell - guitar on "Seeds We Sow"
- Kyle Collins - vocal producing
- Sareena Dominguez - vocals on "Skyscrapers"
