= Lividity (album) =

Studio album by It Dies Today
- Released: September 15, 2009
- Recorded: 2009
- Genre: Metalcore
- Length: 44:54
- Label: Trustkill
- Producer: Mike Hatalak

It Dies Today chronology
Sirens (2006)	Lividity (2009)

Professional ratings
Review scores
Source	Rating
Dangerdog Music	2/5 stars
ReviewBusters	(8.25/10)
Pop Matters	3/10
The Tune Music	(B−)

Lividity is the third full-length studio album by American metalcore band It Dies Today. Originally scheduled for release in Fall August 2008, the album's release date was repeatedly pushed back by Trustkill Records. It was finally released on September 15, 2009. It is the band's only album featuring Jason Wood on vocals after the departure of former lead singer and founding member Nicholas Brooks.

A "Deluxe Edition" was released on the same date, which included a bonus DVD. The bonus DVD features a 37-minute "making of" documentary, entitled "Faking the Record" (including a secondary audio track featuring commentary by the band themselves), a "making of" featurette for the "Thank You for Drinking" video, as well as the video itself. The video appears to be a "preliminary" or "rough" cut (production notes and counters are visible, with header/footer bars), although it is not clear if this was done intentionally, or if the video was not yet finalized at the time of the pressing.

== Track listing ==
All lyrics are written by Jason Wood, except where noted; all music is composed by It Dies Today, except where noted.

No.	Title	Lyrics	Music	Length
1.	"This Ghost"			2:53
2.	"Reckless Abandon"			3:55
3.	"Thank You for Drinking"			3:02
4.	"Miss October"			4:09
5.	"Bled Out in Black and White"			3:13
6.	"Martyr of Truth"			3:36
7.	"Nihility"			3:18
8.	"Life of Uncertainty"			4:48
9.	"The Architects"			3:33
10.	"Complacence without Pursuit (Lividity)"			4:36
11.	"Come Undone" (Duran Duran cover; song ends at 4:20; the hidden track, a drunk acoustic version of "Thank You for Drinking", begins at 4:35)	Simon Le Bon	Warren Cuccurullo, Nick Rhodes, John Taylor	7:45

Japanese release bonus tracks
No.	Title	Lyrics	Music	Length
12.	"Them Bones" (Alice in Chains cover)	Jerry Cantrell	Cantrell	2:30
13.	"Sixth of June" (Extinction Remix)	Nicholas Brooks	Mike Hatalak	3:04

On the European release, the cover of "Come Undone" has been replaced with a cover of "Them Bones" by Alice in Chains. This version also excludes the hidden track.

== Personnel ==
- Jason Wood – lead vocals
- Chris Cappelli – guitar
- Mike Hatalak – guitar
- Steve Lemke – bass, backing vocals
- Nick Mirusso – drums
