= The Bunny the Bear (album) =

Studio album by The Bunny the Bear
- Released: February 4, 2010; April 11, 2016 (reissue)
- Genres: Post-hardcore, metalcore, electronicore, synthpop, experimental rock
- Length: 36:48
- Label: Self-released
- Producer: Matthew Tybor

The Bunny the Bear chronology
The Bunny the Bear (2010)	If You Don't Have Anything Nice to Say... (2011)

Deluxe Reissue Cover
- Remastered Cover Art

Singles from The Bunny the Bear
- 1. "April 11" Released: June 8, 2010

The Bunny the Bear is the debut studio album by experimental post-hardcore band The Bunny the Bear, self-released on February 4, 2010.

The album's only single, "April 11" was released with an accompanying music video on June 8, 2010. The single's video was produced by Six Year Productions, an independent production company.

On February 11, 2016, Tybor announced on Facebook that a remastered edition of the album would be released on April 11, 2016, which would feature two additional bonus tracks. However, the album will not be re-recorded, and will therefore feature Chris Hutka's original vocals.

== Music and Lyrics ==
The album featured Tybor's early vocal style, which was more of a standard scream/growl-technique, before he developed more of yell-type vocals as heard on the later albums. The album is also one of the few to feature screamed vocals from the clean vocalist Chris Hutka, as heard sparsely on tracks such as April 11. However, Hutka openly stated that he disliked screaming and preferred to sing.

Tybor explained the ideas behind the album's two interludes to a group of fans after a show in Buffalo: the first, "I.W.n.F.Y," stands for 'I will not forget you' which can be heard in slow motion throughout the song. The second, "It's Only an Interlude" is based on the cycle of marriage: The calm pianos in the beginning represent ceremony, than the cricket noises come in to represent nighttime, as you can also hear a woman moaning which indicates the intimacy after marriage. After, you hear a baby crying which signifies birth of a child, and the coughing of the mother which explains the inevitable onset of sickness during progression to old age. We then hear some metal-clashing noises along with a very abrupt explosion that represents pain and eventually death at the end of the couple's lifelong bond.

Four of the album's tracks have been re-recorded for future The Bunny The Bear albums. "Prelude to Pregnancy" and "Lust Touch Seed" were re-recorded for the band's following album and major label debut, If You Don't Have Anything Nice to Say. "Flying Like a Bird" was re-recorded for the band's fifth album Food Chain, and "What Shade We Make" was re-recorded for the band's Acoustic EP.

The album was the band's only self-released effort, before being signed to Victory Records in early 2011.

== Track listing ==
No.	Title	Length
1.	"Prelude to Pregnancy"	1:06
2.	"Flying Like a Bird"	3:02
3.	"Lust Touch Seed"	4:17
4.	"It's Not My Fault I Don't Remember Your Name"	3:21
5.	"I.W.n.F.Y (Interlude)"	1:28
6.	"April 11"	3:12
7.	"Leaves"	3:44
8.	"What Shade We Make"	3:41
9.	"A Real Place For Real People"	3:21
10.	"It's Only an Interlude... (Interlude)"	1:07
11.	"Pull Em' Up or Prenup"	5:15
12.	"Conscience as Collateral"	3:14
Total length:		36:48

Deluxe reissue
No.	Title	Length
13.	"The One"	3:46
14.	"Hold Onto Me"	3:47

== Personnel ==
=== The Bunny the Bear ===
- Chris "The Bear" Hutka – clean vocals
- Matthew "The Bunny" Tybor – unclean vocals, songwriting, production, lyrics
- Erik Kogut – guitars
- Chris Cole – guitars
- Derek Anthony – bass
- Jim Kaczmarski – drums, percussion
