= Psyopus =

American mathcore band

- Also known as: Stranglefuck
- Origin: Rochester, New York, United States
- Genres: Avant-garde metal, mathcore, grindcore, progressive metal
- Years active: 2002–2010, 2012
- Labels: Metal Blade; Black Market Activities
- Past members: Christopher Arp; Jason Bauer; Adam Frappolli; Fred Decoste; Greg Herman; Brian Woodruff; Brian Kelly; Lee Fisher; Corey Barnes; Jon Cole; Harrison Christie; Michael Horn; Matt Dalberth; Brent Glover
- Website: www.myspace.com/psyopus Official MySpace

Psyopus (sometimes written as PsyOpus) was an American mathcore band from Rochester, New York. Christopher Arp is the founding member and the only member to remain in the band throughout its history.

== History ==
Formed in 2002, the band was noted for the unorthodox and extremely technical guitar techniques of Christopher Arp, often referred to as "Arpmandude". To get endorsement deals from various guitar and amp companies, Arp had to send a live video of himself playing to prove that he could play as fast as he does. Arp stated "I understand people not understanding us so by default the music comes across as noise but, the music makes sense to us all too much and every 16th note was scrutinized." Regarding learning to play guitar, Arp said: "I learned to play guitar in my bedroom. I got my first guitar in eighth grade. I bought Metallica tablature books, Megadeth books, guitar magazines, didn’t do homework, and just played guitar all night."

The band released their 2nd album, Our Puzzling Encounters Considered, in February 2007. The techniques Arp used made it even more difficult to receive any endorsement. Arp said, "Mesa Boogie has not done very much to sponsor me because I do too much of this," as he raised his guitar by the whammy bar shaking it up and down. The band released their third studio album Odd Senses, on February 17, 2009.

The band entered an extended hiatus in 2010. In 2011, Christopher Arp posted several videos of himself on YouTube explaining the history and eventual hiatus of Psyopus.

In October 2012, Metal Injection revealed that Psyopus would reunite with three of the four original members: Chris Arp, Adam Frappolli, and Fred Decoste. They were joined by drummer Jason Bauers, who was a member until the hiatus.

On July 17, 2015, a YouTube account named The Infamous Arpmandude posted a video titled 5/21/2013 Chris Arp Imogen's Puzzle and Lecture at the U of R. In the hour and ten-minute video, Arp played Imogen's Puzzle Pt. 2 and talked about himself, playing guitar, and the history of Psyopus. He explained that Psyopus is no longer an active band due to frustrations and hardships.

== Members ==
=== Final lineup ===
- Adam Frappolli - lead vocals (2002–2007, 2012)
- Christopher Arp - guitar (2002–2012)
- Fred DeCoste - bass (2002–2007, 2012)
- Jason Bauers - drums, percussion (2007–2012)

=== Former members ===
- Brian Woodruff - vocals (2008–2010)
- Greg Herman - drums, percussion (2002–2004) (Shield Your Eyes, Valpurga, Inertia, Kalibas, Low Ton, North American Wildlife)
- Lee Fisher - drums, percussion (2004–2005) (Commit Suicide, Overlord Exterminator, Fawn Limbs)
- Corey Barnes - drums, percussion (2005–2006) (Paria)
- Jon Cole - drums, percussion (2006–2007) (POWERWOLVES, FINISHER)
- Harrison Christy - lead vocals (2007–2008) (The Jefferson Plane Crash)
- Michael Horn - bass (2007–2009) (The Osedax, Mod Flanders Conspiracy)
- Travis Morgan - bass (2009 touring) (Atheist)
- Brian Kelly - bass (2009 touring) (AD.UL.T)
- Brent Glover - bass (2009 touring) (Bellicist, Reciprocal)

== Discography ==
- 2003: 3003 (Demo EP)
- 2004: Ideas of Reference (Metal Blade/Black Market Activities)
- 2007: Our Puzzling Encounters Considered (Metal Blade)
- 2009: Odd Senses (Metal Blade)
