= Our Puzzling Encounters Considered =

Studio album by Psyopus
- Released: February 20, 2007
- Genre: Mathcore; grindcore; progressive metal; avant-garde metal
- Length: 66:06
- Label: Metal Blade
- Producer: Psyopus and Doug White

Psyopus chronology
| Ideas of Reference (2004) | Our Puzzling Encounters Considered (2007) | Odd Senses (2009) |

Professional ratings
Review scores
| Source | Rating |
|---|---|
| Allmusic | link |
| Stylus Magazine | B March 27, 2007 |
| Metal Hammer | 7/10 stars |
| Revolver | 3/5 stars |

Our Puzzling Encounters Considered is the second album by Psyopus, released on February 20, 2007.

== Track listing ==
1. "The Pig Keeper's Daughter" – 3:34
2. "2" – 4:00
3. "Scissor Fuck Paper Doll" – 3:36
4. "Whore Meet Liar" – 1:54
5. "Insects" – 3:16
6. "Imogen's Puzzle pt. 2" – 4:25
7. "Play Some Skynyrd" – 0:32
8. "Kill Us" – 4:52
9. "Siobhan's Song" – 6:43
10. "Happy Valentine's Day" – 3:11
11. "Our Puzzling Encounters Considered" – 1:55
12. Untitled – 0:06
13. Untitled – 27:54

At 21:31 on the second "Untitled Track" there is a very comical cover of "Catalepsy" by The Red Chord.

== Personnel ==
- Adam 'King Auggie' Frappolli – vocals
- Christopher 'Arpmandude' Arp – guitars
- Fred Decoste – bass
- Jon Cole – drums

All music and lyrics written by Psyopus

- Engineered by Doug White
- Produced by Psyopus and Doug White
- Mastered by Doug White at Watchmen Studios
- Packaging Artwork and design by Aaron Burto for Hell on Earth / K.O.M.S
- Live photos by Taylorwithat
- Interlude to "Imogen's Puzzle pt. 2" recorded by CJ St. Clair at Push Smack Studios.
- Backing vocals on "Whore Meet Liar" by Karen Schiffmacher.
