= Odd Senses =

Studio album by Psyopus
- Released: February 17, 2009
- Recorded: July 21, 2008 – August 16, 2008
- Studios: Watchmen Studios in Lockport, New York, United States
- Genres: Mathcore; grindcore; progressive metal; avant-garde metal
- Length: 62:07
- Label: Metal Blade

Psyopus chronology
| Our Puzzling Encounters Considered (2007) | Odd Senses (2009) |

Professional ratings
Review scores
| Source | Rating |
|---|---|
| Allmusic | 3.5/5 stars |
| Daily Dischord | 3.5/5 stars |
| Thrash Hits | 5/6 stars |

Odd Senses is the third and final album by Psyopus, released on February 17, 2009 via Metal Blade Records.

== Musical themes ==
In an interview with MetalSucks, Arpmandude elaborated on some of the lyrical themes present on the album saying that many of the songs are not "about being pissed off at women." "Medusa" describes the difficulty of getting over someone when we have to see them all the time. ".44" refers to Son of Sam while "Duct Tape Smile" describes the set of a snuff film. "The Burning Halo" touches on exorcism, "X and Y" describes a sex change and "Ms Shyflower" is about being buried alive.

== Track listing ==
All lyrics are written by Christopher Arp; all music is composed by Psyopus.

| No. | Title | Length |
|---|---|---|
| 1. | ".44" | 0:53 |
| 2. | "Medusa" | 3:30 |
| 3. | "The Burning Halo" | 3:59 |
| 4. | "Duct Tape Smile" | 3:33 |
| 5. | "X and Y" | 3:42 |
| 6. | "Boogeyman" | 5:34 |
| 7. | "Imogen's Puzzle Part 3" | 1:59 |
| 8. | "Choker Chain" | 2:49 |
| 9. | "Ms Shyflower" | 6:13 |
| 10. | "A Murder to Child" | 9:15 |
| 11. | "Untitled" | 20:34 |

== Personnel ==
Psyopus

- Brian Woodruff – vocals
- Christopher 'Arpmandude' Arp – guitars
- Michael Horn – bass
- Jason Bauers – drums, percussion, marimba

Additional musicians

- Jennifer Manganiello – guest vocals (tracks 5, 9)
- Adam McOwen – violin (tracks 10)
- Matt Colbert – classical guitar (tracks 10)
- Owen Tomaszewski – cello (tracks 10)

Production and design

- Doug White – engineering
- Craig Schriber – artwork, design
- Justina Villnueva – photography

== Trivia ==
- "Imogen's Puzzle Part 3" was composed in reverse to be played along with "Imogen's Puzzle Part 1".
- The song "Duct Tape Smile" became available on Tap Tap Revenge 3 since March 23, 2009. It is available free from the Metal Blade TTR Channel. It is notable as being one of the hardest songs to be featured in the game, due to its use of irregularly placed speed-taps.
