= The Caitiff Choir =

2004 studio album by It Dies Today

Studio album by It Dies Today
- Released: September 21, 2004
- Recorded: May 21 to June 24, 2004
- Studios: Spider Studio, Cleveland, Ohio
- Genre: Metalcore
- Length: 41:31
- Label: Trustkill
- Producer: Tony Gammalo

It Dies Today chronology
Forever Scorned (2002)	The Caitiff Choir (2004)	Sirens (2006)

Professional ratings
Review scores
Source	Rating
Allmusic	3/5 stars
Lambgoat	8/10
Punknews	1/5 stars

The Caitiff Choir is the debut studio album by American metalcore band It Dies Today, released on September 21, 2004, by Trustkill Records. Music videos were released for the tracks "A Threnody for Modern Romance" and "Severed Ties Yield Severed Heads". Since its release, it has been considered a landmark in the metalcore genre.

== Background ==
In November of 2003, It Dies Today shared that they were halfway done recording their debut full-length album, and were in talks with several different record labels regarding its release. They additionally shared that Steve Lembke had taken on bass duties, with Mike Hatalak has been added on guitar.

In April of 2004, the band signed with Trustkill Records. They shared that they would be entering Spider Studio in Strongsville, Ohio with producer Tony Gammalo to record their debut full-length in April.

In support of the album's release, the band performed in Ozzfest 2005.

On March 21, 2006, the album was re-released with a new artwork, a slightly different mix, and seven bonus tracks. These tracks consist of the re-recorded version of the Forever Scorned EP, as well as a cover of Depeche Mode's "Enjoy the Silence." "The Caitiff Choir: Defeatism" has one minute and 20 seconds trimmed off from its length in this edition. It is also packaged with a DVD that has three music videos and behind-the-scenes material.

In 2008, Trustkill released the album on vinyl as double-LP set featuring both The Caitiff Choir and Forever Scorned. Two versions exist; a yellow and dark gray version and a blue and light gray version.

== Track listing ==
All tracks are written by It Dies Today, except where noted.

No.	Title	Length
1.	"My Promise"	3:26
2.	"Severed Ties Yield Severed Heads"	3:02
3.	"The Radiance"	3:15
4.	"The Depravity Waltz"	3:10
5.	"A Threnody for Modern Romance"	3:30
6.	"Marigold"	3:06
7.	"Freak Gasoline Fight Accident"	3:49
8.	"The Caitiff Choir: Revelations"	3:12
9.	"Our Disintegration"	3:40
10.	"Naenia"	3:36
11.	"The Caitiff Choir: Defeatism"	7:39
Total length:		41:25

Re-release bonus tracks
No.	Title	Writer(s)	Length
12.	"Sentiments of You"		4:20
13.	"Bridges Left Burning"		4:11
14.	"The Requiem for Broken Hearts"		5:37
15.	"Forever Scorned"		4:02
16.	"Blood Stained Bed Sheet Burden"		5:07
17.	"A Romance by the Wings of Icarus"		6:20
18.	"Enjoy the Silence" (Depeche Mode cover)	Martin Gore	4:01
Total length:			79:28

== Personnel ==
It Dies Today

- Nicholas Brooks – lead vocals
- Christopher Cappelli – guitar
- Mike Hatalak – guitar
- Steve Lemke – bass guitar, backing vocals
- Nick Mirusso – drums

Additional personnel

- Tony Gammalo – production, recording, engineering, backup vocals on "The Radiance", "Marigold" and "Freak Gasoline Fight Accident", guitar solo on "A Threnody for Modern Romance"
- Tom Hutten – mastering
- Aaron Marsh – art, photography, design
- Staci Holahan – band photography
