= It Dies Today =

American metalcore band

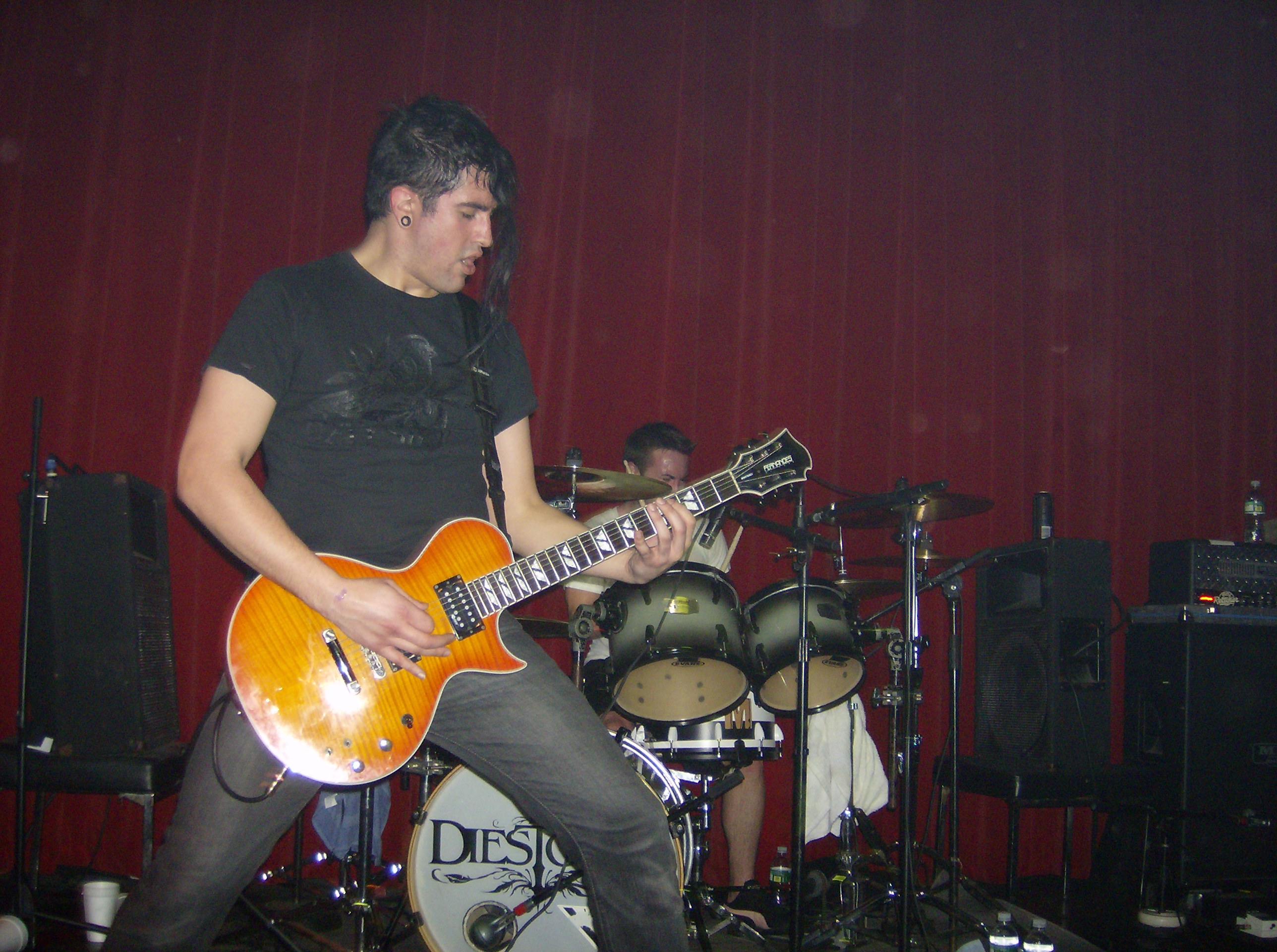
- It Dies Today performing in 2008

Background information
- Origin: Buffalo, New York, United States
- Genres: Metalcore
- Years active: 2001–2015, 2023–present
- Labels: Trustkill, Life Sentence
- Members: Nicholas Brooks; Mike Hatalak; Chris Cappelli; John Runkle; Steve Lemke
- Past members: Jason Wood; Nick Mirusso; Seth Thompson; Joe Cuonze; Steve Sanchez
- Website: itdiestoday.com

It Dies Today (sometimes abbreviated "IDT") is an American metalcore band formed in Buffalo, New York, in September 2001. The band achieved success in 2004 with the release of their debut album, The Caitiff Choir. After frontman Nicholas Brooks departed in 2006, just after the release of the band's sophomore effort Sirens, It Dies Today released Lividity in 2009 before going on hiatus in 2010. The band reunited briefly for a show in 2012, but the reunion paused again in 2015. On December 22, 2022, It Dies Today was announced as an act appearing at FurnaceFest 2023. The band then played Better Lovers BLissmas in their hometown of Buffalo on 8 Dec 2023.

== History ==
=== Formation, EPs and The Caitiff Choir (2001–2004) ===
It Dies Today was formed in August 2001 in Buffalo, New York and was originally composed of vocalist Nicholas Brooks, guitarist Chris Cappelli, and guitarist Steve Lemke (who now plays bass). The band took their name from the Adamantium song "It Dies Today" off the 1998 album, "From the Depths of Depression." During their formation, most of the band members were only 16 years old. Their initial release was a three-track demo titled Let the Angels Whisper Your Name, recorded in late 2001. The following year, It Dies Today released an EP titled Forever Scorned, which led to the band touring the U.S. with artists such as Between the Buried and Me and Alexisonfire.

In 2003, Lemke switched to bass as guitarist Mike Hatalak joined. Prior to joining It Dies Today, Hatalak played in bands called Short of Breath, Plain of Ashes, and Stricture. The group eventually signed with Trustkill Records, home to hardcore heavyweights such as Throwdown, Eighteen Visions, and Bleeding Through.

Fall 2004 brought about the release of the band's debut full-length The Caitiff Choir. The album sold over 25,000 copies within four months and allowed the band to sell out two national headlining tours with support from Twelve Tribes, Anterrabae, Trivium and others. Alternative Press named them a "Band To Know" in 2005. The album has sold 90,000 copies to date.

In 2005, It Dies Today went on a series of whirlwind tours including tours supporting Bleeding Through, Walls of Jericho, All That Remains, and Throwdown, as well as appearing on the PETA-sponsored "Compassion Over Fashion" tour with Most Precious Blood and Remembering Never. The group also supported metal bands such as God Forbid, Machine Head and The Haunted, as well as securing a spot on the coveted Ozzfest second-stage in the summer of 2005. The following summer, the band was scheduled to take part in the Van's Warped Tour but had to cancel due to a vocal injury sustained by Brooks.

=== Sirens and departure of Nicholas Brooks (2006–2007) ===
It Dies Today spent 2006 writing and recording their follow-up album with producers Gggarth and Ben Kaplan. Co-producing were vocalist Nick Brooks and guitarist Mike Hatalak, who owns DWS Studios in Niagara Falls, New York.

On October 17, 2006, It Dies Today released Sirens, which was followed by a U.S. tour. A song from the album, "Sacred Heart (Sacre Coeur)" was featured in the 2009 film Jennifer's Body, while another song, "Sixth of June", was featured on the Resident Evil: Extinction. On January 17, 2007 it was announced that Brooks had left the band and that his replacement would be Jason Wood, whom they met while on tour with Still Remains. Before joining It Dies Today, Jason, a Grand Rapids, Michigan native, was the vocalist for the metal outfits Kamilla and The Orphan. Later that year, the band played Warped Tour alongside Still Remains, Throwdown, Poison the Well, As I Lay Dying, and Parkway Drive, among others.

=== Lividity and hiatus (2007–2010) ===
It Dies Today spent the latter half of 2007 working on their third album, breaking in early 2008 for a small tour before getting back to work for the remainder of the year. After several delays in recording, as well as push-backs by Trustkill Records, the new album Lividity was released on September 15, 2009. The band immediately embarked on a North American tour but were denied access into Canada and had to cancel a handful of shows.

On August 13, 2009, it was announced that the band would be playing at Australia's Soundwave Festival in 2010. The band then played at the Mountain Metal Mayhem Festival in Berlin, NH on August 14, 2010 with Within The Ruins, Bloodlined Calligraphy, Threat Signal, Thy Will Be Done, Unearth, and local support. In September 2010, former vocalist Nick Brooks and current It Dies Today guitarist Mike Hatalak formed a new hardcore band called The March. They have since recorded and posted demos on the band's MySpace page.

Rumors of a break-up began to spread due to the lack of updates, but in December 2010 drummer Nicholas Mirusso posted on the band's Facebook account, "We are currently on an indefinite hiatus. No promising news to give at the moment, other than we've all been submerged into the "real" world." Their Facebook account also uploaded two unreleased tracks entitled “Pee Wee…Listen To Reason” and a cover of Alice In Chains' “Them Bones” in October 2011.

=== Temporary reunion (2012–2015) ===
On November 23, 2011 the band announced a reunion show with original vocalist Nicholas Brooks. Days after the performance on January 28, 2012, guitarist Mike Hatalak publicly stated that It Dies Today was no longer a band, but less than a month later, the statement would be retracted when the band stated that their new EP would be out on December 12, 2012. Someone from the band said, "Yes, patience, please. We are no longer in our early twenties living at our parents' house. We have jobs, responsibilities, and new families we've created. We're not bound by a label, so true fans will appreciate the time we're investing in this." However, the planned EP never came to fruition.

On January 19, 2014, a video featuring a new recording, presumably by Mike Hatalak, was posted on the band's Facebook page. The full demo of the recording, titled "Son of Dawn, Brilliant Star", was later released on Lambgoat.com on April 29, 2014, with the band also announcing a set of shows in September to celebrate the 10 year anniversary of the release of The Caitiff Choir on the same day. This is the first track to feature Nicholas Brooks since the release of Sirens eight years prior, marking a return to the original lineup for the band. In response to his return, Brooks commented, "I honestly could not be happier to have the opportunity to not only play shows with these dudes again but to write and record a new album with them as well." However, on February 13, 2015, Nicholas Brooks announced that due to a "severe case of writer's block and family life", the potential album effort had been postponed indefinitely.

=== New singles (2023-present) ===
On September 15, 2023, It Dies Today released a new single, "Buried by Black Clouds" with an accompanying music video. They appeared at the 2023 Furnace Fest in Birmingham, AL on September 24. Following their reunion at Furnace Fest, It Dies Today played BLissmas in their hometown Buffalo on 8 Dec 2023.

On September 13, 2024, they released "Son of Dawn", which is a remake of the previously released demo titled "Son of Dawn, Brilliant Star" back in 2014, this time with much better sound quality, and a lyric video to go along with it.

== Members ==
=== Current ===
- Chris Cappelli – guitars (2001–2015, 2023–present)
- Nicholas Brooks – lead vocals (2001–2007, 2012–2015, 2023–present)
- Steve Lemke – bass guitar, backing vocals (2003–2015, 2023–present), guitars (2001–2003)
- Mike Hatalak – guitars (2003–2015, 2023–present)
- John Runkle – drums, percussion (2024–present)

=== Former ===
- Seth Thompson – bass (2001–2003)
- Joe Cuonze – drums (2001)
- Aaron Adkins – guitar (2001)
- Nick Mirusso – drums, percussion (2002–2015, 2023–2024)
- Steven Sanchez – bass (2003)
- Jason Wood – lead vocals (2007–2012)

=== Touring ===
- Tony Lorenzo – guitars (2004)

== Discography ==
=== Studio albums ===
- 2004: The Caitiff Choir (re-released in 2006)
- 2006: Sirens
- 2009: Lividity

=== EPs and Demos ===
- 2001: Let the Angels Whisper Your Name
- 2002: Forever Scorned (re-released in 2006)

=== Compilations ===
- 2005: Masters of Horror Soundtrack
- 2006: The Best of Taste of Chaos
- 2006: Headbanger's Ball: The Revenge
- 2006: A Santa Cause: It's a Punk Rock Christmas
- 2007: Resident Evil: Extinction Soundtrack
- 2009: Saw VI Soundtrack
- 2009: Soundwave 2010

== Videography ==
Year	Song	Album
2004	"A Threnody for Modern Romance"	The Caitiff Choir
2004	"Severed Ties Yield Severed Heads"	The Caitiff Choir
2005	"Enjoy the Silence" (Depeche Mode cover)	Masters of Horror soundtrack
2006	"Sacred Heart (Sacré Cœur)"	Sirens
2009	"Thank You for Drinking"	Lividity
2023	"Buried by Black Clouds"	Non-album single
