= Tidal Arms =

- Origin: Brooklyn, New York
- Genres: Psychedelic rock, post-hardcore
- Years active: 2009 - Present
- Members: Francis Mark; Tom Tierney; Patrick Southern
- Website: http://www.tidalarms.com

Tidal Arms is an experimental/psychedelic/rock band from Brooklyn, New York that formed in 2009. They self-released their first album, The Sun Exploding, on February 13, 2011, and followed up with a national tour supporting Glassjaw. The band's self-titled second album was released on November 26, 2013 via Black Numbers.

== Formation ==
Following the break-up of his bands From Autumn To Ashes and Biology, vocalist/drummer Francis Mark went on to form Warship. In 2009, after the departure of Warship's co-founding members, Mark met guitarist Tom Tierney on Craig's List and hired him to perform with the band on a national tour supporting Goblin Cock. Mark and Tierney continued playing together after the tour, splitting time writing between Philadelphia and Brooklyn. Shortly thereafter, ex-Kiss Kiss bassist Patrick Southern was brought into the rehearsals and writing sessions for what would become Tidal Arms.

== Band Name Origin ==
When two galaxies pass by each other in close proximity, their shapes distort due to each other's gravity. The outside spiral arms splay out into space, often casting stars and dust into the abyss as their host galaxies drift slowly back towards each other in orbit. These spiral distortions are called tidal arms, or more commonly, tidal tails.

== Members ==
- Francis Mark - drums
- Tom Tierney - guitar, vocals
- Patrick Southern - bass

== Discography ==
- "Hair and Teeth/Flooded Meadows" 7" (2010)
- The Sun Exploding (2011)
- Tidal Arms (2013)
