= Too Bad You're Beautiful =

Studio album by From Autumn to Ashes
- Released: August 14, 2001; March 8, 2005 (reissue)
- Recorded: May 15–23, 2001
- Studio: Zing Studios in Westfield, Massachusetts
- Genres: Metalcore; post-hardcore; screamo; emo
- Length: 47:51
- Label: Ferret
- Producers: Adam Dutkiewicz, From Autumn to Ashes

From Autumn to Ashes chronology
Sin, Sorrow and Sadness (2000)	Too Bad You're Beautiful (2001)	The Fiction We Live (2003)

Reissue Cover
- March 8, 2005, Reissue Cover

Too Bad You're Beautiful is the debut album by the Long Island-based post-hardcore band From Autumn to Ashes. The album features the dual vocals of Benjamin Perri and drummer Francis Mark. Perri provides the hardcore-esque shouts while Mark sings and occasionally contributes background screams. The album was reissued in 2005 with the Sin, Sorrow, and Sadness demo as bonus tracks at the end.

A music video was released for the song "The Royal Crown vs. Blue Duchess".

== Background and release ==
From Autumn to Ashes formed in 2000 with Benjamin Perri (vocals), Stephen Salvio (guitar) and Francis Mark (drums, clean vocals). The band spent its first few months touring and would record the EP Sin, Sorrow and Sadness, which would be released through Tribunal Records that same year. Following the EP's release, the band would appear on Warped Tour over the summer. In early 2001, From Autumn to Ashes performed with Skycamefalling and Martyr AD, where Carl Severson, founder of Ferret Music, was in attendance; the band would be signed to the label the following day. Around this time founding guitarist Stephen Salvio left the band and was replaced by Brian Deneeve.

Production of Too Bad You're Beautiful lasted from May 15 to 23 in 2001. The album was produced by the band and Adam Dutkiewicz of Killswitch Engage at Zing Studios in Westfield, Massachusetts. Each song on Too Bad You're Beautiful is written about a relationship vocalist Benjamin Perri had. The album was released through Ferret Music on August 14, 2001. Too Bad You're Beautiful has sold over 100,000 units and remains one of Ferret's best-selling releases.

== Track listing ==
All lyrics are written by Benjamin Perri and Francis Mark, except where noted; all music is composed by From Autumn to Ashes, except where noted.

No.	Title	Lyrics	Length
1.	"The Royal Crown vs. Blue Duchess"		3:59
2.	"Cherry Kiss"		3:43
3.	"Chloroform Perfume"		4:29
4.	"Mercury Rising"	Mark	0:49
5.	"Capeside Rock"		4:05
6.	"Take Her to the Music Store"		5:18
7.	"The Switch"		4:16
8.	"Reflections"		7:30
9.	"Eulogy for an Angel"		4:18
10.	"Short Stories with Tragic Endings" (feat. Melanie Wills)	Mark, Perri, Melanie Wills	9:24
Total length:			47:51

Reissue bonus tracks
No.	Title	Music	Length
11.	"Reflections of Anguish on a Face So Beautiful"	Stephen Salvio, Perri, Mark, Gross, Pilato	5:17
12.	"Trapped Inside the Cage of My Soul"	Perri, Mark, Salvio, Gross, Pilato	3:47
13.	"A Lie Will Always Defeat the Truth"	Perri, Mark, Salvio, Gross, Pilato	3:10
14.	"IV" (instrumental)	Perri, Mark, Salvio, Gross, Pilato	2:27
Total length:			62:32

== Reception and legacy ==
Professional ratings
Review scores
Source	Rating
Chronicles of Chaos	8/10
Lambgoat	7/10
Punk News	5/5 stars

Too Bad You're Beautiful has received highly positive reviews since its release. The album is often considered to be one of the best metalcore albums ever released.

Chronicles of Chaos reviewer Xander Hoose praised the band's ability to mix fast-paced hardcore with slower, melodic moments. Hoose criticized drummer Francis Mark's clean vocals noting his vocals were off-key at times and kept the album from being perfect.

Lambgoat reviewer Mustapha Mond noted the band's ability to mix hardcore, metal, emo. Mond highlighted the songs "Cherry Kiss," "Capeside Rock," "Take Her to the Music Store," and "Reflections." Mond stated that "'The Royal Crown -vs.- Blue Duchess' took so many disparate elements, and yet somehow managed to keep a unified sound - it stayed one song the whole time. But over the course of 'Too Bad,' one cannot help but feel that too many things happen separately, and never quite gel." Mond concluded by calling Too Bad You're Beautiful one of the best albums of 2001, despite its flaws.

In a 5/5 review, Punk News praised the album for its variety of musical styles and elements, from the hardcore of album opener "The Royal Crown vs. Blue Duchess" to the metal of "Cherry Kiss" to the acoustic emo of "Chloroform Perfume" and the spoken word of "Mercury Rising." The review highlighted "Take Her to the Music Store" and "Reflections" as examples of how the band can quickly change tempo and song structure. The review called closing track "Short Stories with Tragic Endings" a masterpiece, praising the use of violins and Melanie Wills's performance.

In 2020, Brooklyn Vegan included Too Bad You're Beautiful on its list of "15 albums that defined the 2000s post-hardcore boom."

== Personnel ==
From Autumn to Ashes

- Benjamin Perri – unclean vocals
- Francis Mark – drums, clean vocals, backing unclean vocals
- Scott Gross – guitar
- Brian Deneeve – guitar, backing vocals (all tracks except for 11–14 on the reissue)
- Mike Pilato – bass
- Stephen Salvio – guitar (tracks 11–14 on the reissue)

Additional personnel

- Adam Dutkiewicz – producer, engineer, additional guitar, additional vocals on "Reflections" and "Short Stories with Tragic Endings," double bass on "Short Stories with Tragic Endings"
- Melanie Wills – additional vocals on "Short Stories with Tragic Endings"
- Victoria Pilato – violin on "Short Stories with Tragic Endings"
- Alan Douches – mastering
- Phillip Dwyer – artwork, design
- Jessica Lynn Lastowski – photography
