= Faith and Failure =

Studio album by Century
- Released: February 7, 2006
- Recorded: 2005
- Genre: Mathcore
- Label: Tribunal
- Producer: Carson Slovak

Century chronology
Faith and Failure (2006)	Black Ocean (2008)

Faith and Failure is the debut album of Century, released in 2006.

== Reception ==
Professional ratings
Review scores
Source	Rating
Allmusic	3.5/5 stars

== Track listing ==
All songs were written by Century, except where noted.

1. "Obsolescence" – 3:39
2. "Bilateral Consequence" – 3:28
3. "A Threat, Conquistador" (Century, Chad Taylor) – 4:23
4. "Back Into the Woodwork" – 2:45
5. "The Last Neighborhood in America" – 3:55
6. "Watch Them Become Animals" – 3:15
7. "Men Eater" – 4:00
8. "The Lungs of the Ocean" (Andrew Kintzi, Carson Slovak) – 1:19
9. "Kingsnake" – 5:53
10. "The Fate of Arbogast" – 3:34

== Personnel ==
- Carson Slovak – guitar, vocals, producer, engineer, artwork, mastering, mixing, layout design, video editor, video director
- Mike Giuliano – guitar
- Joshua Groah – bass
- Grant McFarland – drums
- Mike Radka – engineer
- Tom Hutten – mastering
