= Scott Gross =

American musician (born 1979)

- Gross in April 2004

Background information
- Born: Scott Eric Alexander Gross; June 19, 1979 (age 47)
- Origin: Queens, New York, U.S.
- Occupations: Musician, guitarist, producer, composer, writer, audio engineer
- Instruments: Guitar, piano
- Years active: 1998–present
- Labels: Ferret Records; Vagrant Records
- Website: www.hitandrunstudios.com%20hit%20and%20run%20studios

Scott Gross is an American musician, guitarist, composer, producer, audio engineer and writer known as a member of the band From Autumn to Ashes and owner and founder of Hit And Run Studios in Long Island, New York. Before From Autumn to Ashes he was in a local band called Who's to Blame with Francis Mark. Gross was one of the songwriters in From Autumn to Ashes and also wrote lyrics for the first two albums along with Perri and Mark. He also is named as a producer on Jordan White’s 2016 EP “High Road.”

== Musical career ==
Scott entered music after listening to the Pearl Jam album Ten and his mom bought him an electric guitar for Christmas.

=== Who's to Blame (1998–2000) ===
Who's to Blame was a local band from the Long Island, New York, area. The band consisted of Francis Mark, Scott Gross, Mike Pilato, and others.

=== From Autumn to Ashes (2000–2004) ===
Scott and a friend started talking about a new project while they still were in "Who's to Blame". They wanted to do something much more inspirational and complex. Something new for people to grab onto. That project became FATA. Scott and Fran were just out of high school when FATA started in September 1999. The line up to that time was: Scott Gross, Francis Mark, Steven Salvio, Benjamin Perri, Mike Pilato.

On March 5, 2000 they've released their first demo called "Sin, Sorrow and Sadness" via Tribunal Records.

After a while, before their debut was released, Steve left and Brian Deneeve joined the band.

Mark said the following things about Salvio's department:

"Basically the way that went was, we had another guitar player in the band, Steve, and he was a bit older than us. He was 27–28 years old. He had a career, like a real job that he planned on sticking with for the rest of his life. We started the band, it was just to have a good time, it wasn't serious. He thought he would be able to stick with job. Then when we started touring extensively, I quit school and all the other guys quit their jobs, we were like, 'Ok, you gotta quit, we gotta go.' And when it came down to it, he just couldn't do it. So he left, and we found this guy who has absolutely nothing else to live for but this band."

Gross recorded one demo and two albums with From Autumn to Ashes, before he left.

=== Taking a break and first steps into production (2004–2007) ===
When he asked to leave From Autumn to Ashes due to ongoing psychological problems and drug abuse he took a break from being a musician. He said in an interview: "I was tired of the rock lifestyle, the endless touring and I didn't want to do music just to be popular." He was in a few bands. One of these was called "The Mirror" but Scott got more and more into studio work.

=== Accident and recovery (2007–2009) ===
In an interview with decoymusic, Scott said:

"The basics are this. My car broke down on the side of the interstate. I pulled over, put my hazards on, and got out to call for help. When I got out of the car, another car drove off the right lane and hit me at 75 mph, pinning me between both cars, then [the other car] drove away, never hitting his breaks or stopping. The injuries were severe. My left leg was shattered open, bones littered across the interstate. The back of my head split in half, the car hit me so hard I had its part number indented into my chest. That's the accident. I was in a coma. I've been on therapy ever since, and they miraculously saved my leg, putting it back together with a bunch of titanium. Although they're not sure how much better it will get, I'm grateful to still have it. I work hard at therapy in hopes of one day getting this pain under control and walking normally again. Numerous surgeries and procedures undergone, many more to go most likely, so I say my prayers every day."

Because of the severity of his injuries, Scott was unable to move within the following years and that's what got him more into studio work.

=== Lullaby the Storm (2009) ===
On February 17, 2009 the news came up that Scott will enter the studio sometime in March to begin production on an as-yet-unnamed new project. While Gross wrote all of the music and the bulk of the lyrics, he considered this a group effort. He said about that: "I recruited my friend Kia, who is an amazing musician, to handle vocals,". "I also have a keyboard player named Jeff who adds all these layers of sound to the songs."

Later it was revealed that Kia wasn't involved anymore.

On April 5 he started tracking and mentioned that it will be a concept album. Later the band name was revealed so as the members of the project: Scott Gross, Jeff Gillson, Mari-Elaina, Greg Odette

Mari-Elana is the sister of Antonio Longo who was the original vocalist of Taking Back Sunday. He came up with all of the vocal melodies, harmonies and vocal arrangements. Antonio is an old friend of Scott. They were roommates. Scott was just his best man but he had no idea about Mari's vocal abilities until she came down to do a guest spot on the demos and Scott just knew he had to get her to sing on all of the songs.

The meaning behind the bandname explained Scott in an interview with thrashmag: "Since I've been living in such an excruciating amount of pain since this car accident... it's the nights that get to you. You're all alone, time slows down, the clock ticks... you just want to sleep and the pain rains down on you...all you want is that cure.... that Lullaby that can put you to sleep, the calming of the storm. Until you experience something so purely evil it's really hard to even relate to."

The sound of Lullaby the Storm stands between Elliott Smith and Jack's Mannequin according to Scott.

The Debut Album "3 Lanes Painted Red" was released on November 10 via 567 Records.

=== Untitled New Project (2011–present) ===
On December 18, 2011 Scott stated that he started tracking drums for an unknown project. He said several times that it won't be similar to FATA but this time it will be a heavier project, even heavier than FATA was. On May 12, 2012 Scott stated that the title of the new project's cd will be Emergency and that it's currently in the mixing process.

In the meanwhile "Emergency" was released under the same band name

In January 2016, Gross was tapped as a producer for Jordan White's "High Road" EP with Grammy Award-winning producer Jim Annunziato in Long Island, NY.

As of 2020 Scott is now the exclusive producer of several up and coming rappers and singers, one of them being vampires4hire.

In early 2024 Scott was named a production engineer on 'PTSD', the sophomore album of York, PA rapper Benny Bugz. The pair have been working together since his relocation to the South Central region of Pennsylvania in late 2013. The two formed an irreplaceable bond after meeting at EQuinox Music & Arts, a music studio in Dallastown, PA owned by Don Belch.

Scott has been working out of the Bombshelter recording studio in Red Lion, Pennsylvania.

As of July 2024 Always Chasing Ghosts has released a new song.

== Selected discography ==
=== with Benny Bugz ===
- 2024 - PTSD

=== with Emergency ===
- 2012 – Emergency EP

=== with Lullaby the Storm ===
- 2009 – 3 Lanes Painted Red (567 Records)

=== with From Autumn to Ashes ===
- 2003 – The Fiction We Live (Vagrant Records)
- 2001 – Too Bad You're Beautiful (Ferret Music)
- 2000 – Sin, Sorrow, and Sadness (Tribunal Records)
