= The Fiction We Live =

2003 studio album by From Autumn to Ashes

Studio album by From Autumn to Ashes
- Released: September 9, 2003
- Recorded: 2003
- Studios: Plumper Mountain Sound in Gibsons, British Columbia and Greenhouse Studios in Vancouver
- Genres: Post-hardcore; emo; screamo; metalcore
- Length: 40:01
- Label: Vagrant
- Producer: Garth Richardson

From Autumn to Ashes chronology
Too Bad You're Beautiful (2001)	The Fiction We Live (2003)	Abandon Your Friends (2005)

Professional ratings
Review scores
Source	Rating
AllMusic	2.5/5 stars
Punk News	2.5/5 stars
Sputnikmusic	3/5 stars

The Fiction We Live is the second studio album by the American post-hardcore band From Autumn to Ashes. It was released in September 9, 2003 through Vagrant Records. Melanie Wills of One True Thing makes a guest appearance once again, contributing to the vocals on "Autumn's Monologue". This is the last album to feature Scott Gross and Mike Pilato. It peaked at number 73 on the US Billboard 200 charts.

== Production ==
Following the release of Too Bad You're Beautiful, From Autumn to Ashes was approached by Island Records who showed interest in signing the band. The deal fell through after a disagreement between the band and label over the production of The Fiction We Live. The band would eventually sign to Vagrant Records after months of speculation.

== Videos ==
Three music videos were produced for The Fiction We Live: "The After Dinner Payback", "Lilacs & Lolita" and "Milligram Smile". They aired on Headbangers Ball upon release.

== Musical style ==
The album features more clean vocals than the previous album, Too Bad You're Beautiful, with three songs having no screaming vocals. "Autumn's Monologue" is a re-working of "The Fiction We Live" with the collaboration of Melanie Wills. "Autumn's Monologue" is a continuation of "Short Stories with Tragic Endings" from Too Bad You're Beautiful, while "The Fiction We Live" is a response to "Autumn's Monologue".

Frontman Benjamin Perri said the songs on The Fiction We Live were more structured compared to the band's debut, saying this was due to the band being together longer.

== Track listing ==
All lyrics are written by Benjamin Perri and Francis Mark, except where noted; all music is composed by Francis Mark, Scott Gross, Brian Deneeve and Mike Pilato.

No.	Title	Lyrics	Length
1.	"The After Dinner Payback"		2:51
2.	"Lilacs & Lolita"		2:42
3.	"No Trivia"	Mark	4:09
4.	"Milligram Smile"		3:36
5.	"The Second Wrong Makes You Feel Right"		4:58
6.	"Every Reason To"		2:54
7.	"Autumn's Monologue" (featuring Melanie Wills)	Wills	4:33
8.	"Alive Out of Habit"		4:58
9.	"All I Taste Today Is What's Her Name"		3:37
10.	"The Fiction We Live"	Mark	1:19
11.	"I'm the Best at Ruining My Life"	Mark	4:24
Total length:			40:01

== Personnel ==
From Autumn to Ashes

- Benjamin Perri – unclean vocals
- Francis Mark – drums, clean vocals, additional unclean vocals
- Scott Gross – rhythm guitar
- Brian Deneeve – lead guitar
- Mike Pilato – bass guitar

Artwork

- P.R. Brown – art Direction, photography, design

Managerial

- Cory Brennan – management
- Irene Richter – managing assistant
- Tim Borror – US booking agent
- John Jackson – international booking agent

Production

- Garth Richardson – producer
- Dean Mahler – engineer
- Christopher Shaw – mixing
- Zach Blackstone – mixing assistant
- Chris Crippen – drum technician
- Ben Kaplan – digital Editing, engineer, programming
- Misha Rajaratnam – mixing assistant
- Lee Robertson & Gordon Sran – assistant engineers
- Darryl Romphf – assistant engineer, production coordination
- Howie Weinberg – mastering

== Charts ==
Album

Chart (2003)	Peak position
US Billboard 200	73
Top Independent Albums	5
