= Lvl. 1 =

Studio album by Last Chance to Reason
- Released: August 7, 2007
- Recorded: 2007
- Studios: The Basement Studio, Rural Hall, North Carolina
- Genres: Progressive metal; mathcore; nintendocore
- Length: 31:51
- Label: Tribunal
- Producer: Jamie King

Last Chance to Reason chronology
Dreamt of an Angel, Woke With a Nightmare (2005)	Lvl. 1 (2007)	Level 2 (2011)

Professional ratings
Review scores
Source	Rating
AllMusic	3.5/5 stars

Lvl. 1 is the debut studio album by American progressive metal band Last Chance to Reason. The album heavily references video games, especially Super Metroid. Song titles include "Escape From Brinstar", "Kraid Ain't Got Shit On Me", and "Destroy Mother Brain" (references to Nintendo's Super Metroid) and "Maddens for Noobz" (referencing the John Madden series of video games).

The album cover features artwork based on Super Metroid, with a male character on the cover showing some appearance similarities to that of Samus Aran.

Producer Jamie King commented on how "the album sounds like the group is playing Metroid across each song." King likened the sound to "aliens taking over the world," and the band embraced the theme.

A video was released for "Get Awesome" in 2008.

== Track listing ==
No.	Title	Length
1.	"Owned By a Stingray Barb"	2:23
2.	"She's My Bloody Pie"	2:53
3.	"Escape From Brinstar"	1:12
4.	"Me and Tom Brokaw Are Like "This""	3:51
5.	"Maddens for Noobz"	3:15
6.	"It's Professional When That Happens"	2:40
7.	"Kraid Ain't Got Shit on Me"	1:36
8.	"Get Awesome"	2:19
9.	"Those Were Real Witch Bones"	3:27
10.	"Joe Dirt"	3:08
11.	"Destroy Mother Brain"	0:38
12.	"Cock Eating Bullet"	4:29
Total length:		31:51

== Personnel ==
- Bob Delaney – lead vocals
- A.J. Harvey – guitar
- Chris Corey – bass
- Brian Palmer – keyboards
- Evan Sammons – drums
