= Jordan White (musician) =

American rock musician and singer-songwriter

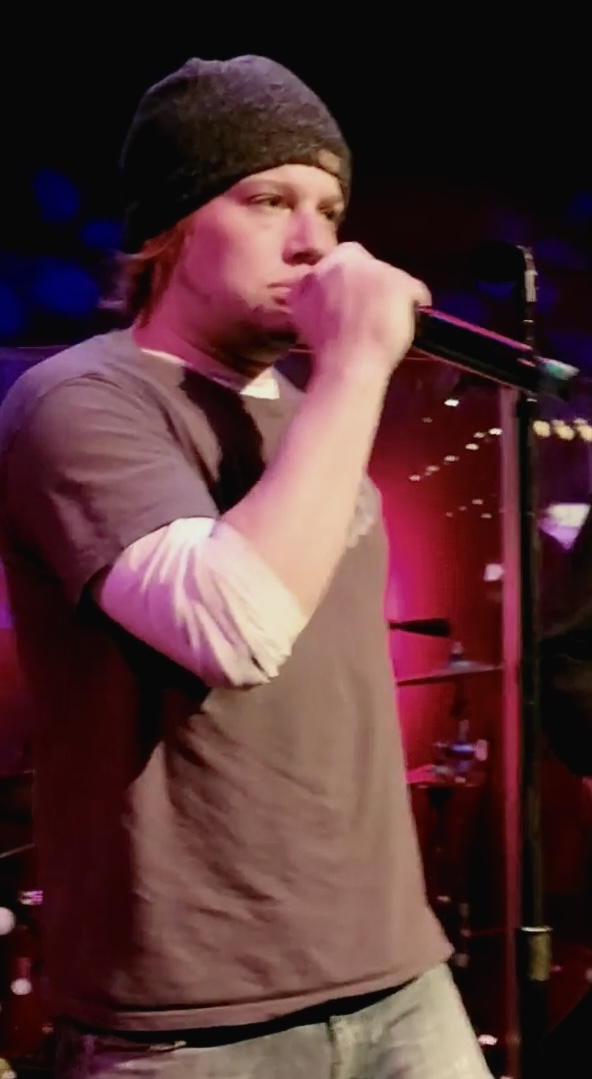
- White performing in February 2023

Background information
- Born: Jordan Frank White; May 6, 1984 (age 42)
- Origin: Cranford, New Jersey, U.S.
- Genre: Alternative rock
- Instruments: Vocals, guitar
- Years active: 2008–present
- Labels: Flexitone Records, Pangea Recordings
- Website: http://www.JordanWhiteMusic.com

Jordan White (born May 6, 1984) is an American rock musician and singer-songwriter.

== Early life and education ==
White was born May 6, 1984, in Cranford, New Jersey. His family later moved to Nazareth, Pennsylvania, where he graduated from Nazareth Area High School in the Lehigh Valley region of eastern Pennsylvania.

White has been awarded an A.A. from Northampton Community College in Bethlehem, Pennsylvania, a B.A. from East Stroudsburg University of Pennsylvania in East Stroudsburg, Pennsylvania, and M.S. in psychological science from Shippensburg University of Pennsylvania in Shippensburg, Pennsylvania.

White explained that periods of depression that he experienced as a teenager led him to begin composing original music, saying in 2010 that music "saved me from being another statistic."

== Career ==
White has performed as a solo artist, in cover bands, in an acoustic trio, and in an alternative rock band, KineticBlu, which formed in Allentown, Pennsylvania, in 2008. The band had been inactive until the acoustic act Foreplay, in which White, guitarist Brian Kibler and vocalist Tara Crowe, were performing merged with drummer Rob Lilly to relaunch the group. The band was dubbed "The Lehigh Valley's Sexiest Rock Band" by Eventful.com, in February 2008.

=== KineticBlu ===
KineticBlu was named Alternative Addiction's "Next Big Thing" for October 2010. The band performed at the fifth annual Bethlehem Harvest, the third annual Blue Mountain "Rock The Fall" Festival, and, in February 2011, the 15th annual Millennium Music Conference & Showcase in Harrisburg, Pennsylvania, an event that draws nearly 300 musical acts from across the country.

=== Flexitone Records ===
During the summer of 2015, White signed with Flexitone Records and began recording the upcoming single "Crazy Girl" with producer David Ivory. The track was mastered by Tom Coyne. The song was released nationally on the Flexitone label in September 2015.

=== High Road EP ===
In January 2016, White recorded a new six-song EP titled High Road with Grammy Award-winning producer Jim Annunziato at Logos Studios in Massapequa, New York. Multi-platinum selling producer and songwriter Eric Sanicola, and From Autumn to Ashes rhythm guitarist Scott Gross both contributing to the recording, and the EP was released by Pangea Records in October 2016.

=== Four Songs ===
Critical reviews of White's "Four Songs" have been mixed with its single "Maybe Amy" placed in rotation at hundreds of U.S. and U.K. radio stations. In an interview on Philadelphia radio, he explained the EP was an "attempt to fuse the confessional singer-songwriter vibe stemming from Southern California during the 1970s with a 1990s alternative, full band sound." The Sentinel reported that Four Songs "contains moments of pop and flavor of southern rock paired with plenty of clean guitar licks amongst White's clear and distinctive vocals."

That Music Mag reported that "White's catchy lyrics really do not really draw attention but are easily stuck in your head, although he seems to be giving you just what he knows."

The Owl Mag described the EP as "taking music back to beautiful simplicity."

One Minute Sound reported that White's Four Songs "kicks off with the track "Maybe, Amy," which is a throwback to the sound of 90s pop icons like Third Eye Blind and Matchbox 20; the EP then rolls into 'Bloodshot' and features heavier driven guitar riffs and a solo borrowed from the pages of Counting Crows. 'Before I Go Out', the third track, is probably the favorite and features subtle slide guitar licks and a quirky piano line. White undeniably has an ear for writing catchy, radio-friendly songs and is extremely talented, however his musical style is a bit outdated Even when he is pushing out creativity, it still sounds as if he is trying too hard to emulate his influences. White's voice is clean and crisp, though it may not be the composition as much as the production to blame."

Dustin Schoof of The Express-Times wrote that, "White goes from belting out a tender, folksy acoustic tune ("Maybe, Amy") to plugging in and cutting loose on "Bloodshot", highlighted by a smoking guitar lead. "Before I Go Out" is more of a roots rocker, complete with background harmonica. "No Promises" is a piano ballad that is heartfelt without veering into cheesy territory. It's a balanced and robust and shows off White's skills as a musician and songwriter.

Michael Phoenix of The Hub wrote that the lead single "Maybe, Amy" "could have been from the television shows Saved by the Bell or California Dreams but gave the rest of the album a positive review, writing that, "White comes back, hitting you with the hard beat of 'Bloodshot', a great change up and a way to keep your attention, while 'Before I Go Out' is a good transition song in leading into the piano ballad 'No Promises' with references made to Philadelphia and the Jersey shore, leading you to feel the passion of the song from both the music and lyrics."

DJ "RJ" from WPHT-FM's "The Note" described the collection of songs as "engaging, thoughtful, and very focused; it's an enjoyable listen from a talented singer."

Sandy Lo of WHOA magazine wrote that, "White's music is certainly lyrically based which is a breath of fresh air nowadays with so much machinery and big beats thrown into songs." White also responded regarding his much publicized affair with American Idol that "the problem [with the show] is the judges dismissed the best singers but would then send a guy through wearing a clown costume."

=== Musical influences ===
In June 2011, White said his musical influences "started with singer-songwriters out of the 1970s," and referenced Van Morrison, Jackson Browne, and Billy Joel as influences. He also cites Guns N' Roses, Counting Crows, Tom Petty, The Beatles, Ritchie Valens, and The Clash. His music is considered a mixture of alternative rock and acoustic-confessional pop-rock.

=== Awards and recognition ===
In November 2007, White was a finalist in the Lehigh Valley Acoustic Competition and, in 2008, KineticBlu was nominated for two Lehigh Valley Music Awards. In August 2010, White was nominated for three 2010 Lehigh Valley Music Awards for Best Songwriter, Best Lyricist, and Best Band Website, which included 3,000 other fan and industry nominees. On December 5, 2010, White performed at the awards ceremony in Allentown, which was well received. White was nominated for two Montgomery/Bucks County music awards in November 2011 and also nominated for two more Lehigh Valley Music Awards, Best Songwriter and Best Male Vocalist, in April 2012 returned to WFMZ-TV.

In 2012, White was nominated for three Lehigh Valley Music Awards, including Best Lyricist, Best Singer-Songwriter, Best Folk Band/Soloist. The same year, he was nominated for Outstanding Songwriter in the 2012 Philadelphia music awards, and, in November 2013, was nominated for five Philadelphia Music Awards, including Outstanding Performer, Outstanding Singer-Songwriter, Outstanding Male Vocalist, and other awards. White accompanied American Idol's "Top 100" contestants Tyler Grady and Tim Marchetto at the 2014 Lehigh Valley Music Awards on March 9, 2014.

== Personal life ==
White lived in suburban Philadelphia but moved to Myrtle Beach, South Carolina later in life.

== Discography ==
Four Songs EP (2012) Track listing:

1. "Maybe, Amy" (3:45)
2. "Bloodshot" (5:25)
3. "Before I Go Out" (3:28)
4. "No Promises" (4:20)

=== Crazy Girl single (2015) ===
"Crazy Girl" (3:54)

High Road EP (2016)

1. "High Road" (3:02)
2. "Like The Rain" (3:50)
3. "12/26" (2:25)
4. "September" (3:52)
5. "Comin' Round Again" (3:04)
6. "Random Hearts" (3:44)
