= Francis Mark =

American drummer

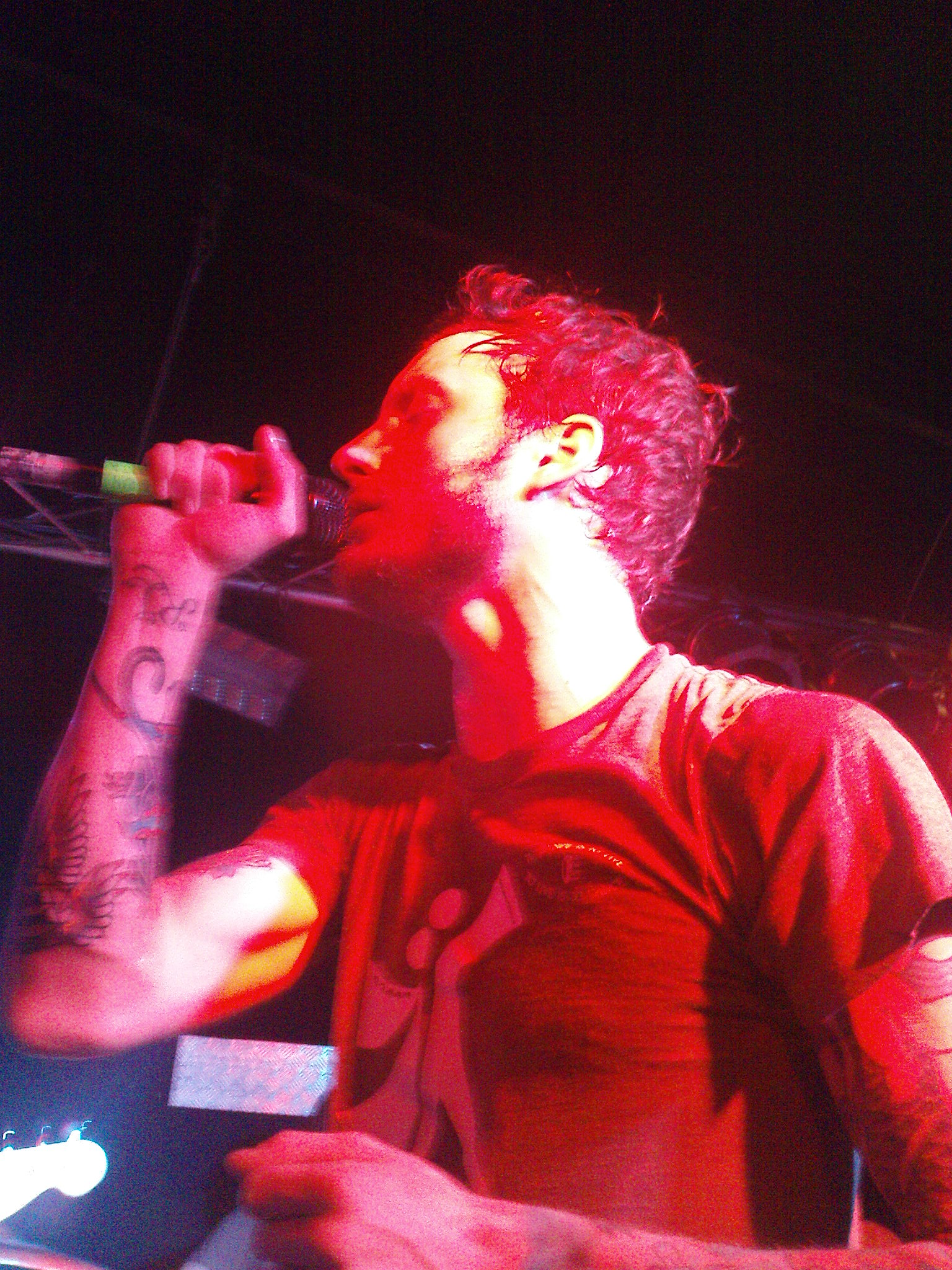
- Francis Mark performing at Underground in Cologne, Germany on January 30, 2008

Background information
- Born: Francis Edward Mark
- Origin: Brooklyn, New York, United States
- Occupation: Musician
- Instruments: Vocals; piano; guitar; drums
- Years active: 2000–present
- Label: Vagrant

Francis Mark is an American drummer, singer, guitarist, songwriter and artist known as a member of the bands From Autumn to Ashes, Warship, Biology, and Tidal Arms. Mark currently resides in Detroit, Michigan. Before From Autumn To Ashes, he was in a local band named Who's to Blame with Scott Gross and played drums for Reggie and the Full Effect in 2008.

== Selected discography ==
=== with Tidal Arms ===
- 2013 – Tidal Arms
- 2011 – The Sun Exploding

=== with Warship ===
- 2008 – Supply and Depend (Vagrant Records)

=== with Biology ===
- 2005 – Making Moves (Vagrant Records)

=== with From Autumn to Ashes ===
- 2007 – Holding a Wolf by the Ears (Vagrant Records)
- 2005 – Abandon Your Friends (Vagrant Records)
- 2003 – The Fiction We Live (Vagrant Records)
- 2001 – Too Bad You're Beautiful (Ferret Music)
- 2000 – Sin, Sorrow, and Sadness (Tribunal Records)
