= Virtue Has Few Friends =

EP by A Thousand Times Repent
- Released: March 11, 2008
- Recorded: 2007–2008
- Genre: Deathcore
- Length: 28:18
- Label: Tribunal Records

Original cover
- The independent release cover art for Virtue Has Few Friends

Professional ratings
Review scores
Source	Rating
Ultimate Guitar	8.3
AllMusic	3.5/5 stars
Sputnik Music	3/5 stars
Encyclopedia Metallum	99%
Indie Vision Music	5/5 stars

Virtue Has Few Friends was the only release by the deathcore band A Thousand Times Repent, due to losing their drummer and not finding a replacement. The song, "Curses! Another Shape-Shifting Wraith" features a clip from the flash cartoon Ninjai.

== Critical reception ==
Greg Prato of AllMusic writes: "Riffs that continuously lurch forward and back, vocals that sound like gunk bubbling up through your drain pipe, and rhythms so complex and unpredictable that Einstein would've been a fan -- all of these elements are on display throughout the 2008 release by A Thousand Times Repent, Virtue Has Few Friends. While the sextet (which includes a three-man guitar attack -- something not all that common in the realm of extreme metal) specializes primarily in the aforementioned style, the band members also have a few surprises up their sleeves. Case in point: the track "A Band of Hunters Stalk in Edo," which starts off with the group's trademark style before taking a left turn seemingly out of nowhere into tranquil, almost emo-ish terrain. But don't be misled; A Thousand Times Repent are much more about brutality than melody—so be prepared before committing to Virtue Has Few Friends." Ultimate Guitar's review states: "What a great Album. Good production with great full sounding guitar and drums. Each song stands out and has 'special moments' that make them unique. Reminds me very much of Whitechapel in terms of musicianship. The music itself is not particularly innovative, but it is solid. I find myself listening to them more than many other deathcore bands because of their solid balance of groove and technicality." Sputnik Music's reviewer writes: "In conclusion I feel that this band is doing something remotely original.Their unique mixture of Tech Deathcore with Progressive parts, makes for an interesting listen.I also feel that if they dropped most of the brees and breakdowns, they could be one of the best bands in their genre." Encyclopedia Metallum's review says: "A Thousand Times Repent have made Christianity work with metal, using lyrics that are hardly connected and giving a significantly harsh view against demonic foes. They've made breakdowns work in the best way I've ever heard, and for that; they must be congratulated several times. Their demise as a band is a demoralizing fact, as I would have loved new material; but this will always be one of my favorite EPs, from a very promising group of musicians." Absolute Punk writes: "A Thousand Times Repent feature talented musicians and a good clean vocalist, but the metalcore parts are so overdone that I didn't fully enjoy it. The clean parts and particularly the closer save this EP from being totally forgettable, though, and I recommend checking the band out if you're an ardent fan of metalcore." Josh at IVM writes: "This band transcends the new wave of most deathcore and somehow have blended both beauty and brutality into a masterpiece! This album is one of my favorite albums of 2007, easily in the top 5! This EP is amazing and clearly the folks at Tribunal thought so as well, and are re-releasing it March 11th. Do yourself a favor and pick this incredible debut up!"

== Track listing ==
No.	Title	Length
1.	"Curses! Another Shape-Shifting Wraith"	3:48
2.	"A Band of Hunters Stalk in Edo"	5:19
3.	"Take Me to the Witch of the Waste... We Have Much to Discuss"	3:45
4.	"That Was the Night Everything Changed"	5:32
5.	"So Much for Middle Earth"	4:07
6.	"Complete Relinquish, Utter Abandon"	3:15
7.	"Hidden track" (CD-ROM Version)
Total length:		25:46

== Personnel ==
A Thousand Times Repent

- Darsen Avery – vocals
- Nate Leford – guitar
- Chris Dowd – guitar
- Chris Van Valkenburg – guitar
- Blake Williams – bass
- Shannon Hill – drums
