= A Thousand Times Repent =

American Christian deathcore band

- Also known as: ATTR
- Origin: Atlanta, Georgia, U.S.
- Genres: Deathcore
- Years active: 2006-2011
- Label: Tribunal Records
- Past members: Blake Williams; Darsen Avery; Nate Leford; Chris Dowd; Chris Van Valkenburg; Shannon Hill; Jeremy Hopkins

A Thousand Times Repent was a Christian deathcore band that was last signed to Tribunal Records, a record label that also holds bands such as He Is Legend, Century, and Prayer for Cleansing. The band released an EP, titled Virtue Has Few Friends, before disbanding, due to losing their drummer and not finding a replacement.

== Members ==
Last known line-up

- Darsen Avery - vocals (2006-2011)
- Nate Ledford - guitar (2006-2011)
- Chris Dowd - guitar (2006-2011)
- Jeremy Hopkins - bass (2008-2011)

Former members

- Chris Van Valkenburg - guitar (2006-2010)
- Blake Williams - bass (2006-2008)
- Shannon Hill - drums (2006-2011)

Timeline

== Discography ==
- Virtue Has Few Friends (2007; EP)
