= Level 2 (Last Chance to Reason album) =

Studio album by Last Chance to Reason
- Released: April 12, 2011
- Recorded: 2010
- Studios: Mother Brain Studios, Augusta, Maine; The Basement Studios, Winston-Salem, North Carolina
- Genres: Progressive metal; melodic metalcore
- Length: 43:50
- Label: Prosthetic
- Producers: Jamie King; Last Chance to Reason

Last Chance to Reason chronology
| Lvl. 1 (2007) | Level 2 (2011) | Level 3 (2013) |

Professional ratings
Review scores
| Source | Rating |
|---|---|
| Allmusic | 3/5 stars |

Level 2 is the second full-length album by metal band, Last Chance to Reason. It was released in 2011 through Prosthetic Records and is their first release since leaving Tribunal. It is also their last album with guitarist Thomas Waterhouse and keyboardist Brian Palmer who left the band in August 2011 during a tour of America.

Set in a virtual world, the album's concept revolves around the relationship between man and technology, "combining the lore of classic science-fiction with a soundscape of asymmetrical, thoroughly written, purposeful chapters". Not content to simply release the piece as a musical endeavor, the band created a "full-length video game that’s synchronized with Level 2's underlying tracks."

== Track listing ==
| No. | Title | Length |
|---|---|---|
| 1. | "Upload Complete" | 5:32 |
| 2. | "Coded to Fail" | 2:56 |
| 3. | "Taking Control" | 1:29 |
| 4. | "Temp Files" | 3:36 |
| 5. | "Programmed for Battle" | 4:34 |
| 6. | "Portal" | 5:12 |
| 7. | "The Parabolic" | 2:44 |
| 8. | "The Linear" | 6:30 |
| 9. | "The Prototype" | 5:34 |
| 10. | "Apotheosis" | 5:43 |
| Total length: | | 43:40 |

== Personnel ==
Last Chance to Reason

- Michael Lessard – vocals
- AJ Harvey – guitars, additional engineering
- Evan Haines – guitars
- Chris Corey – bass
- Brian Palmer – keyboards, additional engineering
- Evan Sammons – drums, programming, lyrics

Additional personnel

- Jamie King – engineering, mixing, mastering, production
- Eric Arena, Evan Sammons, Noah Cole, Tom Waterhouse – additional engineering
- Joshua Andrew Belanger – artwork
