= Supply and Depend =

Studio album by Warship
- Released: November 4, 2008
- Recorded: 2008
- Genres: Post-hardcore, alternative metal
- Length: 38:48
- Label: Vagrant
- Producer: Andrew Schneider

Professional ratings
Review scores
Source	Rating
AllMusic	3.5/5 stars
Alternative Press	4/5 stars
PopMatters	6/10
Punknews.org	3/5 stars

Supply and Depend is the first and only studio album by Warship, the band founded by Francis Mark and Rob Lauritsen, both members of From Autumn to Ashes. It was released on November 4, 2008 on Vagrant Records and features 10 tracks the band recorded with producer Andrew Schneider over the summer. Almost all of the songs from the album were played live on the band's recent tour with Reggie and the Full Effect.

Artist Brad Bacon made the cover of the album. Shirts with the album cover on them are also available at the band's shows.

== Track listing ==
1. "Toil" – 4:34
2. "Profit Over People" – 3:33
3. "Wounded Paw" – 3:37
4. "Where's Your Leash" – 3:49
5. "Lousy Horoscope" – 4:34
6. "We've Never Been Equal" – 2:47
7. "Fetus Flytrap" – 4:12
8. "Empty Vessel" – 2:53
9. "The Waiting List" – 4:50
10. "Indoors" – 3:59

== Personnel ==
- Francis Mark – drums, vocals
- Rob Lauritsen – guitar, bass
