= Canvas Solaris =

American progressive metal band

- Origin: Statesboro, Georgia
- Genres: Progressive rock Progressive metal Experimental rock
- Years active: 1999–2011, 2014–present
- Labels: Sensory, Tribunal Records
- Members: Nathan Sapp; Hunter Ginn; Chris Rushing; Donnie Smith; Gael Pirlot
- Past members: Brad Jeffcoat; Jimmy McCall; Ben Simpkins

Canvas Solaris are an American progressive metal band from Statesboro, Georgia, formed in 1999, and disbanded in 2011. Though they first played with vocals, they moved on to instrumental, drawing influence from bands as diverse as Cynic, Rush, King Crimson, Death, Watchtower, and The Mars Volta.

== Biography ==
Hunter Ginn (drums), Nathan Sapp (guitar), and Jimmy McCall (bass) formed Canvas Solaris in 1999 in Statesboro, Georgia. Brad Jeffcoat joined the band to serve as a vocalist. At this point, the band was playing mainly technical death metal, influenced by bands like Voivod and Carcass. They recorded two untitled demos of four songs each and toured in South Carolina for several years before Jeffcoat and McCall both left the band. Ben Simpkins joined as a second guitarist, bassist, and keyboardist, the band decided to drop vocals entirely, and they put out the EP Spatial/Design in 2003 on Tribunal Records. A year later, in 2004, they released their first full-length album, Sublimation.

In February 2005, the band signed with Sensory Records, where they remain today, and put out their second full-length album, Penumbra Diffuse in 2006. Their next album, 2007's Cortical Tectonics, was their last to feature Ben Simpkins on guitar, bass, and keyboards. Chris Rushing, Donnie Smith, and Gael Pirlot joined on guitar, keys, and bass, respectively, and the band put out The Atomized Dream in 2008. Following its release, they toured with Dysrhythmia and Behold... The Arctopus. The band released Irradiance in 2010.

Since disbanding in 2011, the band have formed The Universe Divide and The Burden of Existence with vocalist Narissa Wolke (releasing a self-titled album).

In 2013, the band announced a reunion with a new album in the works, clarifying this in a Facebook comment. An album was anticipated to be released in 2014 and funded independently via a public fundraiser website. After announcing the completion of the drum tracking in 2017, it was not until a December 2020 Facebook post that they officially announced a release for the new album, by then entitled Chromosphere, in May 2021.

== Band members ==
Most Recent Line-up

- Nathan Sapp - guitar, vocals (1999- )
- Hunter Ginn - drums, percussion (1999- )
- Chris Rushing - guitar (2008- )
- Donnie Smith - keyboards (2008- )
- Gael Pirlot - bass (2008- )

Former members

- Ben Simpkins - guitar, bass, keyboards (2002–2007)
- Brad Jeffcoat - vocals (1999–2002)
- Jimmy McCall - bass (1999–2002)

== Discography ==
=== Studio albums ===
- 2004 - Sublimation
- 2006 - Penumbra Diffuse
- 2007 - Cortical Tectonics
- 2008 - The Atomized Dream
- 2010 - Irradiance
- 2021 - Chromosphere

=== Demos & EPs ===
- 2000 - Demo I
- 2000 - Demo II
- 2003 - Spatial/Design
