= Last Chance to Reason =

American progressive metal band

- Origin: Augusta, Maine, U.S.
- Genres: Progressive metal, metalcore
- Years active: 2004–present (hiatus from 2016–2024)
- Labels: Tribunal, Prosthetic
- Members: Chris Corey; Evan Sammons; A.J. Harvey; Michael Lessard; Joey Izzo

Last Chance to Reason is an American progressive metal band from Augusta, Maine. Their debut album, Lvl. 1, was released through Tribunal Records in 2007. Their first major label debut, Level 2, came in 2011 through Prosthetic Records. The band's third studio album, Level 3, was released on August 6, 2013.

== History ==
=== Early years and first EP (2004−2007) ===
Last Chance to Reason toured throughout 2005, 2006 and 2007 supporting their first EP. Shows with Unearth, The Autumn Offering and As I Lay Dying helped their fan base grow. Several DIY tours and show trading helped LCTR become a staple of the central Maine metal scene. During these times the band experienced several lineup changes. It was also during this time that the band released their first music video for their song "SBTBATAC", filmed and edited by award winning director Kevin James Custer.

=== Lvl. 1 and lineup changes (2007–2009) ===
2007 saw the group's first major lineup change with the departure of guitarist Dustin Boudreau, vocalist Mike Levenseller and the arrival of Bob Delaney. Delaney, a staple of the Maine music scene, became the vocalist for the band's first LP release, Lvl. 1, and would stay with the band until 2008. This also marked a change in style for the band, moving from mathcore to a more progressive based sound. Lvl. 1 was recorded, mixed and mastered by Jamie King in North Carolina and released by Tribunal Records in August 2007. Influences from video games to King Crimson saw the band take on new song structures and melodies. Touring for Lvl. 1 was intense and almost non-stop. Tours with Look What I Did and Car Bomb helped the bands fan base grow even larger.

=== Level 2 and label signing (2009–2012) ===
Writing for Level 2 began in late 2007 with drummer Evan Sammons and guitarist A.J. Harvey writing and recording a basic demos of the record. In September 2008 it was announced that Mike Lessard would be taking over vocal duties and Delaney would no longer be in the band, the departure was seen as amicable for both parties involved. With the vocal situation settled the band began to focus on recruiting a second guitarist, this spot would be filled by Evan Haines. However Haines would eventually be replaced by longtime friend Tom Waterhouse in the summer of 2010. After writing for Level 2 was complete, the band recruited friend and original producer of Lvl 1, Jamie King, to record the album in North Carolina. The drums and vocals were recorded entirely with King, while guitar, bass, and keyboards were recorded by the band at their Mother Brain studios in central Maine. The album was edited, mixed and mastered by King and released on April 12, 2011 through Prosthetic Records. Guitarist Thomas Waterhouse and keyboardist Brian Palmer left the band in early August 2011 during a tour of America, reducing the line-up to four again, before recruiting Mike Abdow as a replacement for Waterhouse.

=== Level 3 (2013) ===
Last Chance to Reason announced their third album, Level 3, via their Facebook page on June 20, 2013. The album was released through Prosthetic Records on August 6, 2013. The band had previously said that Level 3 would be a concept album like Level 2. The next day, the band released the first single and music video entitled "The Escapist". They also announced that they be touring from July–August in support of the album, with Evan Brewer supporting them on the tour. As well as this, it was announced that Robby Baca of The Contortionist would be filling on guitars in place of AJ Harvey and Mike Abdow, who left the band shortly after the completion of Level 3.

On June 21, 2013, Mike Lessard announced that he would now be the full-time vocalist for The Contortionist and that Last Chance To Reason would become a side project, as the band had come to a standstill after the completion of Level 3. He stated that discussions had already begun between him and Robby Baca regarding The Contortionist's third album and that he would be flying back to Indianapolis after Last Chance To Reason's North American tour to begin writing the album.

=== Level 4 and return from hiatus (2024-present) ===
On the future of the band, Evan Sammons said in July 2016, "There's no timeline for it, but it's been no secret that we plan to make another record."

After a long hiatus, Last Chance to Reason released a new single titled "Digital Twin". The band featured most of the recent line-up from 2010's, including vocalist Michael Lessard (The Contortionist), guitarist A.J. Harvey, bassist Chris Corey, and drummer Evan Sammons, with the addition of Joey Izzo (Arch Echo) being the first keyboardist since Brian Palmer left the band.

The release of "Digital Twin" was accompanied by a music video directed by Ben Levin. The music was produced and engineered by Sammons, with the mix and master handled by Jamie King. This was followed by the releases of the songs "Archons & Acolytes", "False Walls", and "The Divide" throughout 2024.

== Members ==
Current

- Chris Corey – bass guitar (2004–present)
- Evan Sammons – drums (2004–present)
- A.J. Harvey – guitar (2004–2013, 2014–present)
- Michael Lessard – lead vocals (2008–present)
- Joey Izzo – keyboards (2024–present)

Former

- Michael Levenseller – lead vocals (2004–2007)
- Bob Delaney – lead vocals (2007–2008)
- Brian Palmer – keyboards (2007–2011)
- Dustin Boudreau – guitar (2004–2007)
- Evan Haines – guitar (2009–2010)
- Mike Abdow – guitar (2011–2013)

Touring

- Robby Baca – guitar (2013)
- Thomas Waterhouse – guitar (2010–2011, 2013)

== Discography ==
Studio albums

Year	Album	Label
2007	Lvl. 1	Tribunal Records
2011	Level 2	Prosthetic Records
2013	Level 3	Prosthetic Records

EPs

Year	Album	Label
2005	Dreamt of an Angel, Woke with a Nightmare	Abaddon Records

Singles

- "The Escapist" (2013)
- "Digital Twin" (2024)
- "Archons & Acolytes" (2024)
- "False Walls" (2024)
- "The Divide" (2024)

== Videography ==
Year	Song	Album	Director
2007	"Somewhere Between the Bedroom and the Abortion Clinic"	Dreamt of an Angel, Woke with a Nightmare	Kevin James Custer
2008	"Get Awesome"	Lvl. 1	Michael Dafferner
2011	"Upload Complete"	Level 2	Corey Norman
2011	"The Prototype"	Level 2	Corey Norman
2013	"The Escapist"	Level 3	Corey Norman
