= Blatant Disarray =

American thrash metal band

- Origin: Raleigh, North Carolina, U.S.
- Genres: Thrash metal; speed metal
- Years active: 1999–present
- Labels: Dirt Records; Tribunal Records
- Members: Mike Schaefer; Ryan Johnson; Stephen Parson; Donald Boyd
- Past members: See below
- Website: www.blatantdisarray.net

Blatant Disarray is an American thrash metal band from Raleigh, North Carolina.

== History ==
Everyone Dies Alone is the debut studio album by Blatant Disarray. It was produced by John Custer, mixed and mastered by Jamie King. It was released March 16, 2010, through Tribunal Records.

The Harbinger is the second full-length album by the band. It was released May 13, 2014, through Dirt Records and features a guest appearance by Reed Mullin (Corrosion of Conformity).

Ebon Path is the third studio album by Blatant Disarray. It was released February 12, 2019, through Dirt Records.

High Time for a War Crime is the fourth studio album by Blatant Disarray. It was released on December 18, 2020, through Dirt Records.

== Members ==
Current members

- Mike Schaefer – rhythm guitar, vocals (1999–present)
- Ryan Johnson – lead guitar (1999–present)
- Stephen Parson – drums (2015–present)

Former members

- Tim Worrell – drums (2000–2012)
- Patrick Strickland - bass (2010-2014, 2017-2022)
- Adam Peterson – bass (2003–2010)
- Tyler Smith – bass (2014–2017)
- Trey McLamb – drums (2012–2015)
- Tony Chambers – bass (2000–2001)
- Jeff Pertz – bass (2001–2002)
- Alex Furini – bass (2002–2003)
- Nolan Lawing – drums (2011)
- Jeff Maddry – live bass (2000–2005)

== Discography ==
- Everyone Dies Alone (2010)
- The Harbinger (2014)
- Ebon Path (2018)
- High Time for a War Crime (2020)

Other

- Blatant Disarray (EP, 2001)
