= Holding a Wolf by the Ears =

Studio album by From Autumn to Ashes
- Released: April 10, 2007
- Recorded: November 2006
- Studios: Salad Days, Fell's Point, Maryland
- Genres: Post-hardcore; emo; screamo; metalcore
- Length: 39:52
- Label: Vagrant
- Producer: Brian McTernan

From Autumn to Ashes chronology
Abandon Your Friends (2005)	Holding a Wolf by the Ears (2007)	Live at Looney Tunes (2008)

Professional ratings
Review scores
Source	Rating
AllMusic	3.5/5 stars
Alternative Press	3.5/5 stars
Exclaim!	(favorable)
Metal Hammer	7/10 stars
Lambgoat	7/10
Punk News	4/5 stars

Holding a Wolf by the Ears is the fourth studio album by the American post-hardcore band From Autumn to Ashes. It is also the only album without the band's original singer, Ben Perri, as well as the band's first album recorded with Rob Lauritsen on 2nd guitar, and their last with Josh Newton on bass.

One track from Holding a Wolf by the Ears was released on December 14, track "Deth Kult Social Club." and later "Everything I Need". The album was released on April 10, 2007 through Vagrant Records. It debuted at number 74 on the U.S. Billboard 200, selling about 10,000 copies in its first week. The track "Daylight Slaving" was chosen as a featured song on the soundtrack for Madden NFL 08. The song "Love It or Left It" was featured in the soundtrack for both ATV Offroad Fury 4 and ATV Offroad Fury Pro. The song "On the Offensive" was also featured on the Saw IV soundtrack. Music videos were made for the songs "Pioneers" (released before the album) and "Deth Kult Social Club" (released after the album).

== Track listing ==
All lyrics are written by Francis Mark; all music is composed by From Autumn to Ashes (Francis Mark, Brian Deneeve and Josh Newton).

Holding a Wolf by the Ears track listing
No.	Title	Length
1.	"Deth Kult Social Club"	2:47
2.	"On the Offensive" (composed by FATA with Mike Schleibaum)	3:42
3.	"Recounts and Recollections" (composed by FATA with Schleibaum)	3:02
4.	"Daylight Slaving"	3:38
5.	"Delusions of Grandeur"	2:58
6.	"Sensory Deprivation Adventure"	2:53
7.	"Everything I Need" (composed by FATA with Schleibaum)	3:49
8.	"Underpass Tutorial"	3:20
9.	"Love It or Left It"	3:13
10.	"Travel"	3:01
11.	"A Goat In Sheep's Rosary"	3:47
12.	"Pioneers"	3:42
Total length:		39:52

iTunes bonus tracks
No.	Title	Length
13.	"Hang the Mason"	3:54
14.	"What Good Is My Virtue"	3:42
Total length:		47:28

Japanese bonus tracks
No.	Title	Length
13.	"Y2K"	3:27
14.	"Hang the Mason"	3:54
15.	"What Good Is My Virtue"	3:42
Total length:		50:55

== Personnel ==
From Autumn to Ashes

- Francis Mark – vocals, drums, line drawings, cover
- Brian Deneeve – guitar
- Josh Newton – bass

Additional

- Brian McTernan – producer, engineer
- Paul Leavitt – Pro Tools engineer
- George Marino – mastering
- Michael Barbiero – mixing
- Eric Kaufman – design, layout
