= Black Ocean =

Studio album by Century
- Released: April 29, 2008
- Recorded: Century Studio and MoonTree Studio
- Genre: Metalcore
- Length: 33:00
- Label: Prosthetic
- Producer: Carson Slovak, Chad Taylor

Century chronology
Faith and Failure (2006)	Black Ocean (2008)

Professional ratings
Review scores
Source	Rating
About.com	link
AbsolutePunk.net	(85%) link
Blabbermouth.net	link
SonicFrontiers.net	(favorable) link

Black Ocean is the second studio album by metalcore band Century, the first since the band signed with Prosthetic Records. The album was produced, recorded and mixed by frontman Carson Slovak at his own studio and mastered by Kim Rosen of West Westside Studios. Black Ocean features a cipher code within its artwork to unlock hidden content on the interactive album website blackoceanalbum.com. A video for the track "Black Ocean" was made and debuted on Headbangers Ball in April 2008. Revolver Magazine selected Black Ocean as its #18 album in its Top 20 Albums for 2008 in the February 2009 issue.

== Track listing ==
All songs were written by Century, except where noted.

1. "Pantheon" – 3:06
2. "Black Ocean" – 3:37
3. "Erasure" – 3:57
4. "Drug Mule" – 3:15
5. "Equus" – 3:42
6. "Rising Sun" – 3:17
7. "Monolith" (Century, Mike Guilliano) – 4:00
8. "Daylight Algorithm" – 4:51
9. "Dysgenics" – 0:43
10. "Terror Starts at Home" – 2:44

== Personnel ==
- Carson Slovak – guitar, vocals
- Mike Giuliano – guitar
- Joshua Groah – bass
- Matthew Smith – drums
- Jason Baker – backing vocals
- Ricky Armellino – backing vocals
