= Tidal Arms (album) =

Studio album by Tidal Arms
- Released: November 26, 2013
- Genre: Experimental, psychedelic, metal
- Label: Black Numbers
- Producer: Tidal Arms and Alex Mead-Fox

Tidal Arms chronology
The Sun Exploding (2011)	Tidal Arms (2013)

Tidal Arms is the second, self-titled album from Brooklyn-based rock band Tidal Arms. The album was released on November 26, 2013.

== Recording ==
The band recorded the album alongside Alex Mead-Fox at Spaceman Sound, their studio in Brooklyn, NY. The album was mastered by Alan Douches (Converge, Dillinger Escape Plan). Much of the recording process was documented on the band's Instagram account.

== Release ==
The album saw its release on vinyl and digital outlets on November 26, 2013. The vinyl offerings, pressed by Black Numbers, include 100 pink, 150 sea foam, and 100 clear with black smoke vinyl. Vinyl can be purchased at the band's Bandcamp page. Fans may also stream and download the album digitally from that location as well.

== Critical reception ==
American Aftermath writes, "Every single track tells its own story and could easily stand by itself, but when you put them all together, this becomes a magnum opus. Some bands spent their entire career trying to put together material this strong. The opening track 'Gooski's Ladder' sets a tone for the album that will leave you begging for more and there is so, so much more... 10/10."

Chris Alfano of Gear Gods writes, "Engine Down/Sunny Day melancholy and massive doomy oppression are such a good combination that I'm surprised it's not a played out genre, but very few bands do it. But of those that do, none of them are adept as Tidal Arms. They pull it off perfectly live. I've literally never heard a band with a better pocket and groove in the metal scene."

Andrew Caruso of Under The Gun Review writes, "Tidal Arms presents itself as one of the more ambitious, finely tuned, and well-execute pieces of the year... 9/10."

MetalSucks.net writes, "On their forthcoming self-titled sophomore album Tidal Arms promise to go 'further in all the directions we started down on the debut,' and judging by “Gooski’s Ladder” they've done it; it's noisier, its riffs are beefier, its atmospherics more grandiose, its songwriting more focused, its fuzzed-out vocals that much more powerful."

Andrew Rawlinson of EchoesandDust.com writes, "...An enthralling sonic journey of shifting tempos and dynamics in which the enterprising inventiveness on display plasters and holds a huge grin on the face!"

== Track listing ==
1. "Gooski's Ladder" – 5:09
2. "Mirrorbox" – 4:44
3. "Dunston Mass" – 3:11
4. "Jungle of Dust" – 2:31
5. "Mad Glacier" – 2:56
6. "Molasses" – 7:05
7. "Tide Alarms" – 3:25
8. "Jelloshotgun" – 3:05
9. "Beach Torture" – 5:19
10. "Cosmic Donald's" – 4:05

== Band ==
- Tom Tierney – vocals and guitar
- Patrick Southern – bass
- Francis Mark – drums
