= The Sun Exploding =

Studio album by Tidal Arms
- Released: February 15, 2011
- Genre: Experimental, psychedelic, metal
- Label: Self-released
- Producer: Tidal Arms and Alex Mead-Fox

Tidal Arms chronology
The Sun Exploding (2011)	Tidal Arms (2013)

Professional ratings
Review scores
Source	Rating
Alternative Press	3.5/5 stars
AbsolutePunk	8.2 stars

The Sun Exploding is the first full-length release from Brooklyn-based rock band Tidal Arms. The album was released February 15, 2011.

== Recording ==
After finishing recording their debut single, Hair and Teeth / Flooded Meadows, the band immediately moved toward writing their first LP, The Sun Exploding. The band recording the album themselves at their studio in Greenpoint, Brooklyn, called Spaceman Sound. Says vocalist/guitarist Tom Tierney, "Our goal was to make a record that sounds big, but mostly sounds like the three of us playing our music in our space." When it came time for mixing, the band turned to Andrew Schneider (Pelican, Cave In, Made Out of Babies), who had recorded and mixed the band's aforementioned 7". "Andrew makes great sounding records and his studio is a block from my favorite coffee shop in Brooklyn. It's always a pleasure to go down there and work with him," says drummer Francis Mark.

== Release ==
The album is available for digital download on Tidal Arms' Bandcamp, as well as on iTunes and Amazon. CDs and red/yellow splatter vinyl LPs (limited to 500) are also available on their Bandcamp and at InSound.

== Critical response ==
Exploding In Sound wrote, "Tidal Arms may be the most badass band to emerge from the thriving Brooklyn scene in sometime, and they succeed without alienating any audiences. Indie kids, metal-heads, math rock freaks, post-punkers, stoners, psych rockers, and yes… even hipsters, can all agree that The Sun Exploding was intelligently constructed by a band who clearly loves the music they’re making, creating a phenomenal debut album in the process."

In his review of the album, AbsolutePunk.net staff writer Adam Pfleider wrote, "Stoner rock heads and time signature freaks will latch on like crazy. But it's the ones with a bit of musical background and salivating instrumental tastes that will savor this one the most... Tidal Arms does a wonderful job of making the album continually flow and progress in a steady manner, yet never ends up repeating a dull moment. The album seems to cut itself into three acts. The opening one does a wonderful job, gradually mixing a bowl of harmony and heavily broad riffs and key changes."

Alternative Press reviewer Brian Schultz gave the album 3.5 out of 5 stars, writing, "[The band] manage to smear their own touch across it all for a wildly experimental and yet reigned-in sound that consistently spits out interesting moments."

== Track listing ==
1. "The Dust Collecting" – 1:29
2. "The Sun Exploding" – 3:59
3. "Past Prosperity" – 3:36
4. "Heavy Brainfall" – 4:01
5. "Driftwood" – 4:33
6. "Hair and Teeth" – 4:24
7. "Several Circles" – 5:20
8. "Lower Slaughter" – 4:24
9. "Swarm in Five" – 2:50
10. "Social Landlord" – 3:08

== Band ==
- Tom Tierney - vocals and guitar
- Patrick Southern - bass
- Francis Mark - drums
