= Level 3 (Last Chance to Reason album) =

Studio album by Last Chance to Reason
- Released: August 6, 2013
- Recorded: 2012–2013
- Genre: Progressive metal
- Length: 39:00
- Label: Prosthetic
- Producer: Eyal Levi

Last Chance to Reason chronology
Level 2 (2011)	Level 3 (2013)

Level 3 is the third studio album by progressive metal band Last Chance to Reason. Like the album before it, Level 3 is a concept album. The album was formally announced by the band on their Facebook page on June 20, 2013 and was released on August 6, 2013 by Prosthetic Records.

A music video was released for the song "The Escapist" on June 21, 2013.

Professional ratings
Review scores
Source	Rating
Heavy Blog is Heavy	4.5/5
Me Gusta Reviews	5/5
Metal-Fi	5/5
Metal Injection	7.5/10
MetalSucks	(positive)
Sputnikmusic	2/5 stars

== Concepts ==
In an interview with New Noise Magazine vocalist Michael Lessard stated that "Level 3 is a slight continuation of Level 2, but it’s not all about video games. It evolves from the concept of the character from the previous album transcending from the second dimension into the third, it’s kind of a twisty, turny thing in that, but it’s not about video games this time. It’s a different animal." Commenting on the writing process Lessard stated "The processes were similar but there were different musicians in the mix, so that made for a different creative process just dealing with different people. Generally, it was kind of the same thing but there was a little more distance between us so we had to use the interwebs a little more than usual.

== Track listing ==
No.	Title	Length
1.	"Rebirth"	5:05
2.	"Adrift I: A Vision Begins"	3:55
3.	"Cosmos: Patterns Form"	3:21
4.	"A Glimpse of Omniscience"	4:36
5.	"Adrift II: A Vision Ends"	4:17
6.	"The Escapist"	4:45
7.	"The Dictator"	2:50
8.	"The Artist"	4:59
9.	"Awaiting"	0:43
10.	"Transcendence"	4:29
Total length:		39:00

== Personnel ==
- Michael Lessard – vocals
- A. J. Harvey – guitar
- Mike Abdow – guitar
- Chris Corey – bass guitar
- Evan Sammons – drums
