= Abandon Your Friends =

2005 studio album by From Autumn to Ashes

Studio album by From Autumn to Ashes
- Released: August 30, 2005
- Recorded: 2005
- Genres: Screamo; metalcore; emo; post-hardcore
- Length: 48:48
- Label: Vagrant
- Producer: GGGarth

From Autumn to Ashes chronology
The Fiction We Live (2003)	Abandon Your Friends (2005)	Holding a Wolf by the Ears (2007)

Professional ratings
Review scores
Source	Rating
AllMusic	Positive
Punknews	2/5 stars

Abandon Your Friends is the third studio album by American post-hardcore band From Autumn to Ashes. The album was released on August 30, 2005 through Vagrant Records.

== Sound ==
The album shows a slight departure from their traditional sound. The CD has an increased focus on drummer/vocalist, Francis Mark; after the release of the album it was confirmed by the band (after Benjamin Perri had left) that this was due to Ben not contributing as much lyrically or vocally to the album as with previous efforts, and his discontent about being in the band at the time. The album lyrics were mainly written by the band without Benjamin Perri, which may explain why the lyrics have a different slant on them than previous FATA albums. Also contrary to their previous two albums, Melanie Wills of One True Thing is absent on this release.

== Background and release ==
It has also been said that Josh Eppard of Coheed and Cambria is responsible for naming the song "Placentapede". It was said that when at a festival with Coheed and Cambria, FATA planned to play the song live, and they didn't have a name for it because the album wasn't out yet and the song was still in its early stages. They went to Coheed and Cambria's bus and asked Josh what was the first thing that came to mind, and he responded with "Placentapede".

After the release of the album, From Autumn to Ashes recorded the video for "Where Do You Draw the Line".

The artwork on this album was done by artist Chuck Anderson.

== Track listing ==
All music composed by From Autumn to Ashes. All lyrics by Francis Mark except where noted.

No.	Title	Lyrics	Length
1.	"Where Do You Draw the Line"	Francis Mark, Benjamin Perri	4:28
2.	"Inapprope"		2:47
3.	"Sugar Wolf"		5:37
4.	"Vicious Cockfight"		3:58
5.	"Streamline"		4:40
6.	"The Funny Thing About Getting Pistol Whipped Is..."		2:41
7.	"Placentapede"		5:15
8.	"Kansas City 90210"	Francis Mark, Josh Newton, Brian Deneeve	4:00
9.	"Short for Show"	Francis Mark, Jonathan Cox	4:01
10.	"Long to Go"		4:29
11.	"Jack + Ginger"	Francis Mark, Benjamin Perri	2:49
12.	"Abandon Your Friends"		4:03
Total length:			48:48

== Personnel ==
Credits adapted from AllMusic.

From Autumn to Ashes

- Francis Mark – drums, clean vocals, screamed vocals
- Brian Deneeve – lead guitar, piano, backing vocals
- Benjamin Perri – screamed vocals
- Jonathan Cox – rhythm guitar
- Josh Newton – bass, backing vocals

Additional personnel

- Chuck Anderson – Artwork, design
- Eric Armstrong – Assistant engineer
- Chris Crippin – Drum technician
- GGGarth – Audio production, producer, backing vocals
- Ben Kaplan – Digital editing, programming
- Richard Leighton – Guitar technician
- Dean Maher – Audio engineer, engineer
- Brian McTernan – Editing, engineer
- James Morin – Assistant engineer
- Irene Richter – Management
- Rob Stephanson – Assistant engineer
- Andy VanDette – Digital editing
- Howie Weinberg – Mastering
- Josh Wilbur – Engineer, mixing
