= From the Shallows =

American deathcore band

- Also known as: FTS, From The Shallows Came The Sinners
- Origin: Toledo, Ohio, United States
- Genres: Deathcore, melodic death metal
- Years active: 2004–2009
- Label: Tribunal Records
- Members: Pierce Roberts; David Rhoades; Joe Frost; Marco Mendoza; Steffan Howey
- Past members: Jon Deering; Gabe Fry; Bobby Futey

From the Shallows was a Christian deathcore band from Toledo, Ohio. The band formed in 2004, but has gone on a hiatus. The band has had many members, including a former member of The Black Dahlia Murder. The band has received good reviews from sites such as AllMusic and MetalSucks. Joey Sturgis (The Devil Wears Prada, Gwen Stacy) produced the band's debut and only release, Beyond the Unknown. The band has played live with Once Nothing, Woe of Tyrants, and The Ghost Inside.

== Name and beliefs ==
Lead Guitarist Marco Mendoza addressed whether the band was a Christian band or not, on YouTube. He stated their original name. Here is the full statement:

This is Marco Mendoza I am the Other guitarist and I AM Christian. We started off as a Christian Band we use to be called From The Shallows Came The Sinners. But that name was waaaay to long so we cut it in half. Most of the members where Christian through many changes but we were not always ALL Christian. We wanted to be known as a Positive band more than anything – not necessarily a Christian band – just a band with positive beliefs. Me and our vocalist wrote the lyrics. Yes we are both Christian.

== Members ==
Current

- Steffan Howey - vocals (2006–2009)
- Marco Mendoza - lead guitar (2004–2009)
- Joe Frost - rhythm guitar (2006–2009)
- Pierce Roberts - bass (2008-2009)
- David Rhoades - drums (2006–2009) (ex-Settle the Sky)

Former

- Chaz Hamman - vocals (2004-2006)
- Stephen Poole - drums (2004-2006)
- Brandon Howard - rhythm guitar (2004-2006)
- Gabe Fry - rhythm guitar (2008-2009)
- Bobby Futey - rhythm guitar (2008-2009)
- Shane Little - bass (2006)
- Jon Deering - bass (2007-2007) (ex-The Black Dahlia Murder)
- Matt Smith - studio bass

== Discography ==
EPs

- Beyond the Unknown (May 8, 2007; Tribunal Records)
