= Age of Ruin =

American metalcore band

Age of Ruin is an American metalcore band from Fairfax, Virginia. The group formed in 1998 and released a demo album the following year. The band's first album was self-released in 2000. The band self-released a full-length titled "Nothingman" in 2025.

== History ==
Formed in 1998, the group released a demo in 1999 titled The Opium Dead and their first album, Black Sands Of The Hourglass was self-released in 2000 and re-released in 2004 with two bonus tracks on Tribunal Records. In 2002 the group released an EP entitled Autumn Lanterns for Tribunal Records. After LP and EP releases on Tribunal Records and a number of substantial lineup changes, Age of Ruin released The Tides of Tragedy via Eulogy Records (Alveran Records in Europe) in the spring of 2004. The band drew large crowds across the United States on the Van's Warped Tour 2004, and the hype continued to build. Subsequent tours with bands such as Shadows Fall, Darkest Hour, The Bled, Sworn Enemy, Good Clean Fun and Anterrabae continued to cause an already strong following to grow. In Winter 2006, Age of Ruin kicked off the year with their first European tour, a 25-day tour crossing 12 countries. Sharing the stage with other mainstream acts such as The Black Dahlia Murder, Bleeding Through, and Most Precious Blood.

In 2008, the original lineup of Age of Ruin minus Patrick Owens (who was replaced by Aaron Sirott on drums) got back together and recorded and released "One Thousand Needles" on Eulogy Records.

In 2019, the original lineup of Age of Ruin got back together and began working on an EP. In 2020–2021, the band brought in Jonathan Clay (guitars) from Absolute Vengeance. The group recorded the EP at the Riff Dojo Studio with Mike Schleibaum of Darkest Hour. A video for the track "Dying Days" was released in October 2021.

In 2025, Age of Ruin self-released a full-length titled "Nothingman," along with videos for the tracks "The Ghosts We Carry," "Promise Me," "The Traveler," and "Heavy is the Crown." Mike Schleibaum was once again enlisted to produce the record, which was mixed by Will Beasley of the Bakery Studios in Richmond, VA.

== Lineup ==
- Daniel "Ruin" Fleming - guitar (1998–2004, 2007-current)
- Christopher Fleming - bass guitar (1998–2003, 2008-current)
- Benjamin Swan - vocals (2004–2008, 2022-current)
- Hendrik Osinga - drums (2021-current)
- Casey Flanagan - guitar (2024-current)

== Former members ==
- Derrick Kozerka - vocals (1998–2003, 2008–2009)
- Patrick Owens - drums (1998–2003, 2019–2021)
- Brian Kerley - guitars (2002–2006)
- Joseph Scheibel - bass (2003–2006)
- Colin Kercz - drums (2003–2004)
- David Haik - drums (2004–2006)
- Ryan Haik - guitars (2004–2008)
- Joel Hansen - guitar (2007–2008)
- Aaron Sirott - drums (2007–2008)
- Brian Gant - vocals (2019–2022)
- Jonathan Clay - guitars (2019–2024)

== Discography ==
=== Albums and EPs ===
The Opium Dead (EP) (Darkmoonempire Records, 1999)

1. Terror
2. Blacksunrise
3. Scattered Ashes
4. Torn Out Wings

Black Sands Of The Hourglass (LP) (Tribunal Records, 2000)

1. Footsteps In The Catacombs Of Yesterday
2. The Crimson Fails Forever
3. Shadows Cast In Candlelight
4. Terror
5. Cracks In The Mirror
6. Blacksunrise
7. Angel Dusted Dreamlock
8. Withered Rose
9. Echos In Stained Glass

Autumn Lanterns (EP) (Tribunal Records, 2002)

1. Tainted Ghost Catharsis
2. No Kiss Cuts as Deep
3. Hung Upon the Weakest Branch
4. Glowing Embers
5. Water to Wine, Blood to Ink

Longest Winters Woes (EP) (DFF Records, 2003)

1. The Harlequin's Kiss
2. The Silver Tongues
3. Dimmer
4. Passage of the Winter's Woes
5. The Crimson Fails Forever
6. Bleed For Better Days

Black Sands of the Hourglass (re-release) (LP) (Tribunal Records, 2004)

1. Footsteps In the Catacombs of Yesterday
2. The Crimson Fails Forever
3. Shadows Cast In Candlelight
4. Terror
5. Cracks In the Mirror
6. Blacksunrise
7. Angel Dusted Dreamlock
8. Withered Rose
9. Echoes In Stained Glass
10. The Icarus Syndrome
11. You Give Love a Bad Name (Bon Jovi cover)

The Tides Of Tragedy (LP) (Eulogy Records, 2004)

1. Dawn
2. Yesterday's Ghost
3. Truest Flame
4. Elapse
5. No Kiss Cuts As Deep
6. Diaries Of The Dead
7. Serengeti
8. Bluest Eyes In Blackest Hearts
9. Sirens Passage
10. Glowing Embers
11. Yours To Bury
12. A Portrait Of Solemn Seas ("A Portrait Of Solemn Seas" contains a hidden bonus track, which is a fake live performance of "The Legend of Zelda Theme Song". It begins at the 12 minute and 45 second mark which is at the end of approximately 7 minutes and 7 seconds of silence.)

Live Music Series: Beyond Warped (EP) (Aloha Records, 2007)

1. Bluest Eyes in Blackest Hearts
2. Yesterday's Ghost
3. No Kiss Cuts As Deep
4. Bleed For Better Days
5. Truest Flame

Thieves (EP) (Calm Bomb Collective, 2021)

1. Distance
2. Dying Days
3. And So, Betrayed
4. Garden of Ghosts
5. Thieves in Treason
6. Withered Rose
7. Echoes in Stained Glass

Nothingman (LP) (Calm Bomb Collective, 2025)

1. The Fixation
2. Heavy is the Crown
3. Lost in Shadows
4. The Traveler
5. Nothingman
6. An Awakening
7. The Ghosts We Carry
8. Promise Me
9. Bleed for Better Days
10. Lovesong
