= Warship (band) =

American musical group

- Origin: Long Island, New York, United States
- Genres: Post-hardcore, sludge metal
- Years active: 2008–2009
- Label: Vagrant
- Spinoff of: From Autumn to Ashes
- Past members: Francis Mark; Tom Tierney; Sean Auer
- Website: http://www.myspace.com/mywarship

Warship was a post-hardcore band formed in Long Island in 2008. Former From Autumn to Ashes members Francis Mark (vocals, drums) and Rob Lauritsen (guitar, bass) formed the band following the From Autumn to Ashes' announced indefinite hiatus on June 9, 2008. Mark chose the name Warship, which came from an instance in 2007 when he was creating paintings on blank worship candles, and a friend questioned what he was doing. Mark replied with "making worship candles", however, the friend believed Mark was creating candles with actual warships depicted on them. Mark explains, "This led me to thinking about the relationship between the two. How discouraging it is when 'worship' begets 'warships.'"

== History ==
Warship debuted two songs "Toil" and "Wounded Paw" available on their Myspace, shortly after opening the page. The band has finished recording their debut release with producer Andrew Schneider in a New York studio. The album, entitled Supply and Depend, was confirmed for release on Vagrant Records on November 4, 2008. A track listing, album art, and information on the album can be viewed on the Vagrant Records website.

On June 26, the band announced its North American tour which would run from August 20 (Orlando, FL) until September 14 (Philadelphia, PA). Warship played with Reggie and the Full Effect with Francis Mark on Vocals, Rob Lauritsen on Guitar, Darren Simoes of The Bled on Bass, and friend Greg March on drums.

On March 10, 2009 lead singer and drummer Francis Mark announced that his collaboration with Rob Lauritsen had come to an end, and stated that Warship was now a trio : "Two weeks before the tour started my collaborative efforts with Rob Lauritson came to a grinding halt and in the short time I reinvented Warship as a trio with Tom Tierney on guitar and Sean Auer on bass." Rob Lauritsen is no longer a studio or touring member of the band.

Francis Mark also announced on that same day that he was working on a European tour :"I'm working on a full tour of Europe that will be announced as soon as all of the details are settled." Indeed, this special tour started on May 28, in which the band toured Scotland, England, Netherlands and Germany.

December 30, 2009 Francis Mark put this on the band's official Myspace Blog:

What is happening with Warship?

Hello,

I've gotten a bunch of messages over the last few months with people asking if this is still a band and i apologize for leaving everyone guessing. I didn't know how to respond because when I thought about it I'm not sure if you could call what we did a "band". We did four tours and had four different bass players, three drummers and three guitar players. Rob and I went into the studio and recorded a full length having never played a show and we hoped to fill out the rest of the band after the fact but that never fell into place. We were lucky and grateful to play with so many awesome musicians but it was also stressful and unstable wondering what the cast was going to be as tours approached.

So many things kept working against us. Then some tours came up which Rob could not do and I stubbornly expected him to let all other things in his life fall by the wayside to try to keep Warship on track. Of course this was unreasonable and nearly ended our friendship altogether. With 50% of the creative force of Warship no longer involved I tried to keep it going until summer 09, when I returned from an extremely challenging tour of Europe and my father was in a near fatal motorcycle accident. I spent a lot of time in New York after that with my family and didn't think much about music for a little while.

I'll try to keep this short because I know most are only interested in a yes or no answer as to whether or not Warship is still a band.

A band? No. We will probably never be an active touring band again.

Will we ever make music again? Who knows. I love recording. I would stay in the studio recording new things all year if someone would fund it. Never say never, but don't hold your breath either. Whatever happens, Supply and Depend is something I'm glad we did and proud to have been a part of. At least you'll have that forever.

peace in the new decade,

FM

== Band members ==
=== Final line-up ===
- Francis Mark – lead vocals, drums (2008–2009)
- Tom Tierney – guitar (2009)
- Sean Auer – bass (2009)

=== Former members ===
- Rob Lauritsen – guitar, bass (2008–2009)
- Darren Simoes – bass (2008)
- Greg March – drums (2008)

== Discography ==
Year	Title	Label
November 4, 2008	Supply and Depend	Vagrant Records
