= Century (American band) =

American metalcore band

- Origin: Lancaster, Pennsylvania, United States
- Genres: Metalcore, mathcore
- Years active: 2005–2011
- Labels: Tribunal, Prosthetic
- Members: Carson Slovak; Jason Baker; Todd Mogle; Ricky Armellino; Grant McFarland
- Past members: Mike Giuliano; Joshua Groah; Matthew Smith; George Fava; Chris Kinkade

Century was an American metalcore band formed in 2005 by multi-instrumentalist/ArmsBendBack guitarist Carson Slovak. Century was originally conceived as a solo project, but later evolved into a complete band. Slovak writes all of Century's music, and designs all of the artwork and merchandise. In 2005 the band signed a contract with Tribunal Records. On February 7, 2006, Century released its first studio album, Faith and Failure through Tribunal Records. This album saw Carson Slovak as guitarist and producer joined by Mike Guiliano (guitar), Huggie (bass) and Grant McFarland (drums). Before the album was released, McFarland left to focus more on his current band This or the Apocalypse and was replaced by new drummer Matthew Smith.

In February 2009, it was announced that McFarland had rejoined the band, along with new additions: bassist Ricky Armellino (also of This or the Apocalypse), and additional guitarist Todd Mogle. The band has begun work on the follow-up to Black Ocean, which was released in April 2008.

On March 9, 2010, the band posted a cover of Seal's "Kiss from a Rose" on their Myspace page and announced that they would be working on a new album scheduled to be released later in 2010.

Their third studio album, titled Red Giant, was released on August 30, 2011. It featured Candlebox singer Kevin Martin on the track, "Oak God".

== Members ==
=== Current members ===
- Carson Slovak – vocals
- Jason Baker – guitar
- Todd Mogle – guitar
- Ricky Armellino - bass
- Grant McFarland – drums

== Discography ==
=== Studio albums ===
Year	Album details
2006	Faith and Failure: Released: February 7, 2006; Label: Tribunal; Formats: CD, Paid download
2008	Black Ocean: Released: April 29, 2008; Label: Prosthetic; Formats: CD, Paid download
2011	Red Giant: Released: August 30, 2011; Label: Prosthetic; Formats: CD, Paid download

=== Extended plays ===
Year	Album details
2005	Century: Released: 2005; Label: Self-released; Formats: CD

== Videography ==
=== Music videos ===
Year	Title	Director
2006	"Obsolescence"	Carson Slovak
2008	"Black Ocean"	Carson Slovak
