= Biology (band) =

American indie rock band

- Origin: Long Island, New York, United States
- Genres: Indie rock
- Years active: 2005–2008
- Label: Vagrant Records
- Past members: Francis Mark; Josh Newton; Dan Duggins; Cornbread Compton; Brian McTernan

Biology was an indie rock band that was signed up to Vagrant Records.

Biology was a creation of From Autumn to Ashes drummer Francis Mark (guitar and vocals), Every Time I Die bassist Josh Newton (guitar), producer Brian McTernan (bass) and Cornbread Compton of Engine Down (drums).

Making Moves, Biology's only album, was released September 27, 2005, via Vagrant Records.

Biology announced a breakup on April 4, 2008.

== Members ==
- Francis Mark - lead vocals, rhythm guitar, piano
- Josh Newton - lead guitar, backing vocals
- Dan Duggins - drums
- Cornbread Compton - drums
- Brian McTernan - bass, rhythm guitar

== Making Moves ==
=== Track listing ===
1. "Programming the Populous"
2. "Sophisdecay"
3. "The Measure of My Worth"
4. "Opinions Are Like Addictions"
5. "Public Art"
6. "Arbitrary Stimulation"
7. "New English"
8. "Born Again Virgins"
9. "Employment"
10. "When Future History Became Current History"
11. "Damaged Goods"
