= Ninjai =

- Official poster
- Created by: The Ninjai Gang
- Original language: English
- No. of episodes: 12

Original release
- Release: June 4, 2001

Ninjai: The Little Ninja is a Flash cartoon. The cartoon has not been available online since April 2015.

== Overview ==
The cartoon is a creation of The Ninjai Gang. Ninjai is a web-based animation that centers around the life of Ninjai, a young samurai/ninja who is traveling the world looking for meaning and purpose. Along the way, his path is crossed by rogues or people who help him. Ninjai's best friend is 'Little Bird', a cute and brave sidekick with whom Ninjai often converses.

== History ==
Ninjai first appeared on June 4, 2001 as a trailer created using Adobe Flash, and had a trademark filed for its title on June 14, 2001. The animation series drew a strong following with its unique style and storyline at the time, and ended up producing a total of 12 episodes thereafter, each a few minutes in length.

Despite being made by martial artists who did animation only as a hobby, the quality of the animation grew steadily as the episodes progressed, with more time between each episode as a result. After the release of episode 12, production came to a pause, with the promise of further episodes on the way. Some time later, news broke that the group was abandoning the short-form animations and aiming for a feature-length production with a complete studio. In early 2015, the group posted to their social media channels on Facebook and Twitter with media kits and wallpapers, and asked their followers to recommend blogs to advertise Ninjai in exchange for inside scoops on the series' production. On March 5, 2015, a Kickstarter crowdfunding campaign was announced and possible reward ideas were shared for the following 5 months, but the campaign was never officially launched on Kickstarter.

The Ninjai website remained functional through at least August 2019, and the Ninjai Gang had a presence at New York Comic Con in 2021. The feature-length film that had been announced previously was then slated for release in 2022; however, this did not come to fruition and, as of April 2025, IMDb still indicates that the film is in post-production.
