= From Autumn to Ashes =

American post-hardcore band

- Also known as: FATA
- Origin: Long Island, New York, U.S.
- Genres: Post-hardcore; metalcore; emo; screamo
- Years active: 2000–2008, 2014–present
- Labels: Tribunal; Ferret; Vagrant
- Members: Francis Mark; Brian Deneeve; Mike Pilato; Rob Lauritsen; Jeff Gretz
- Past members: Jonathan Cox; Scott Gross; Josh Newton; Benjamin Perri; Stephen Salvio
- Website: www.facebook.com/FATAOfficial

From Autumn to Ashes is an American post-hardcore band based in Long Island, New York. The group formed in 2000 under the name Who's to Blame. While the band had gone through many lineup changes, the members include Francis Mark (lead vocals, drums), Scott Gross (guitars), Benjamin Perri (screamed vocals), Brian Deneeve (guitars, backing vocals), Stephen Salvio (guitars), Josh Newton (bass guitar, backing vocals), Mike Pilato (bass, backing vocals), Rob Lauritsen (guitars), Jonathan Cox (guitars) and Jeff Gretz (drums, backing vocals, additional guitar).

Described as "melody and lushness meets brutality," the band released their debut full-length album Too Bad You're Beautiful in 2001. The album featured former band member Benjamin Perri on harsh vocals, with Mark providing the clean vocals and acting as drummer. The year 2003 saw the release of The Fiction We Live and 2005, the release of Abandon Your Friends, the last From Autumn to Ashes album with Perri and Mark in their respective roles. After Perri's departure shortly after Abandon Your Friends, Mark became lead vocalist and in 2007, the band released Holding a Wolf by the Ears. On June 9, 2008, the band announced that they had gone on "indefinite hiatus." They insisted that the decision was amicable and the band had simply reached its natural conclusion. They have since reunited and played several shows but have yet to release any new music.

== History ==
=== Formation and Too Bad You're Beautiful (2000–2002) ===
From Autumn to Ashes formed on Long Island in 2000 with Francis Mark (drums, vocals), Steve Salvio (guitar) and Benjamin Perri (vocals) — Perri provided screaming vocals, while Mark sung clean vocals. Commenting on the name of their band, Scott Gross (guitar) said, "you are absolutely not going to get the right answer on this one because that would pretty much end the band" and that "no one is going to know the reason and we are going to keep it that way." The term "Autumn" refers to both the season and a fictional character the band created. Mark and Gross planned to use the character in a book. For the first few months as a touring band, From Autumn to Ashes claimed to have sold half of their equipment, a car, and spent between $3,000 and $4,000 making demos and hand distributing them.

To find a record label, the band says "we pretty much just sent packages to every record label, a shit load of phone calls harassing people." In 2001, From Autumn to Ashes performed in Long Island with Ferret Music bands Skycamefalling and Martyr AD, where the founder of Ferret Music, Carl Severson, attended. The following day, Severson contacted the group and they were soon signed in 2001. The band's debut full-length album, Too Bad You're Beautiful, was released on August 14, 2001. Too Bad You're Beautiful, which was written entirety about a relationship Perri had, sold over 100,000 records in the United States, and thus, From Autumn to Ashes became the highest selling band on Ferret Music. It had also featured vocals on the song "Short Stories With Tragic Endings" from Melanie Wills of the band One True Thing. A reviewer on Punk News stated the album had the ability to "put you to sleep like a baby's lullaby, then smash you awake with the most gut wrenching, floor pounding hardcore this side of the Mississippi freakin' river." In 2000, under the music label Tribunal, the band released the Sin, Sorrow and Sadness EP on December 31, and later took part in the Warped Tour during the summer months. In 2002, the band employed a live drummer for a number of songs so that Mark could focus on the songs in which he did more vocals.

=== The Fiction We Live (2003–2004) ===
In 2003, following speculation as to which label From Autumn to Ashes would release their next record, the band signed to Vagrant Records and enlisted Garth "GGGarth" Richardson as producer. After performing on the 2003 Warped Tour, they released their second full-length album, The Fiction We Live on September 9, 2003, which again featured vocals from Melanie Wills on the song "Autumn's Monologue". The album was described as more melodic in sound than Too Bad You're Beautiful, which had a more "hardcore sound." Perri explained that The Fiction We Live's songs had more structure than their debut release, and was the result of the band's time together. Aubin Paul of Punk News viewed the release as a growth from Too Bad You're Beautiful, writing that "like their previous [album], [this one] contains its share of PSAT words, and overtly maudlin pseudo-poetry, but it's still a big improvement". The move to a larger label and slightly more commercialized sound allowed the band to find more mainstream success, producing three singles, "The After Dinner Payback", "Lilacs & Lolita" and "Milligram Smile". The song "The After Dinner Payback" also appeared on the soundtrack for the horror film Freddy vs. Jason. For the following months, the group toured the country, also playing on the 2004 Warped Tour, during which time Josh Newton (bass) joined, as Pilato left along with Gross.

=== Abandon Your Friends (2005–2006) ===
On March 8, 2005, a re-release of Too Bad You're Beautiful was issued, featuring the songs from the Sin, Sorrow, and Sadness EP. Under direction of producer Richardson, From Autumn to Ashes third full-length album, Abandon Your Friends, was released on August 30, 2005. The album stemmed from the idea that "[abandoning your friends is] kind of...what we do. I mean, in the sense of how life goes on when we go away [on tours]." Abandon Your Friends met with speculation about the band's internal conflicts surrounding a potential break up. Perri had not been much involved in the process of creating the album and did not attend practice sessions, despite stating in interviews that the album was "a full on collaborative effort" and "We just all had a say in what we were writing." It was revealed in 2007, in interviews, and when Mark posted in the band's Myspace blog that he had ghostwritten Perri's lyrics in a matter of days. The band had made a further move away from the heavier sound of their past albums, and had shifted more focus to Mark's vocals. CMJ reviewer Tracey John explained that the album "continues to unabashedly straddle both ends of the hardcore/emo spectrum", however, the band "doesn't show much of a progression from 2003's The Fiction We Live." The album generally garnered reviews in which it was noted that, as a reviewer at Punk News explained that if you're a "fan of From Autumn to Ashes, you'll be disappointed. "Others disagreed, like UK magazine Kerrang! who gave the album a 5 out of 5 review and called it a metal masterpiece. This album would also go on to sell over 100,000 copies. Abandon Your Friends produced one single, "Where Do You Draw The Line?" with an accompanying music video. Unhappy with intraband politics, guitarist Jonathan Cox quit the band.

=== Holding a Wolf by the Ears (2007) ===
After taking a five-month hiatus at the beginning of 2006, From Autumn to Ashes returned and played the length of the 2006 Vans Warped Tour, adding Rob Lauritsen in place of Cox. In September 2006, the band rented practice space and began writing material for what would become Holding a Wolf by the Ears. Brian McTernan was chosen as producer because he had previously worked with Mark and Newton on their side project Biology's album, and the members opted for this release to have a less refined feel than the last albums. As From Autumn to Ashes prepared to begin studio recording for the album, Mark noted that Perri "never came out to any of the practices and he had no involvement. But that was also the way it was when we wrote Abandon Your Friends." Perri had then declared that he would no longer be a part of the band. As Mark explains, "I thought there was a more considerate way he could have gone about leaving the band", but it was ultimately "cool of him to recognize that he just didn't have the passion for the band anymore." Deciding to move on without Perri as a member, Mark then became lead vocalist, providing both clean and screaming vocals in addition to his already recorded drums. Mark, as the band's lyricist explained that he "work[ed] very hard and writing and revising very personal lyrics" and found that a part of him did not want to hand over the lyrics to another to sing, however, with Perri's departure and when Mark began recording vocal tracks, "It immediately seemed like that's the way things had been all along". Mark stated the bulk of the album's lyrics had been "just about living" and "the idea that extremes are dangerous." Recorded in about a month's time, Holding a Wolf by the Ears was named for the quotation by Thomas Jefferson, "But as it is, we have the wolf by the ear, and we can neither hold him, nor safely let him go. Justice is in one scale, and self-preservation in the other." Reviewer Drew Beringer of AbsolutePunk had praised the change in the band's line up, stating that "Mark is three times the front man Perri was", and gave "passion that had been severely lacking while Perri was in the band."

In early 2007, the band began auditioning drummers to take Mark's place in the upcoming tours. Initially looking for a temporary member, From Autumn to Ashes would remain a quartet if they did not get along with the drummer. However, Jeff Gretz was officially added to the lineup and in March 2007, two weeks before From Autumn to Ashes began touring. The These Speakers Don't Always Tell the Truth EP was released on March 13, 2007, featuring songs from the forthcoming album and a previously unreleased track. Holding a Wolf by the Ears was released on April 10, 2007, as the last album for the band's contract to Vagrant Records, and according to Mark, is "heavier than anything we've ever done" and the "closest we've come to capturing how I think this band should sound." Reviewer Corey Apar of AllMusic noted that the band "sounds stronger than it has in awhile [sic]". Music videos for "Pioneers" and "Deth Kult Social Club" were filmed, the former based on The Lottery, a short story by Shirley Jackson, and the latter, a live video shot on Long Island as the end of February 2007. "Pioneers" was released as the first single from the album. In September 2007, Newton left the band and From Autumn to Ashes was joined by original bassist Pilato to take on Newton's place.

=== Live at Looney Tunes and indefinite hiatus (2008–2014) ===
In January 2008, the band performed at the Looney Tunes store in New York. A recording of this show was released on Vagrant records on June 17, 2008. This album was From Autumn to Ashes final release. A week before the live album came out, the band announced they were going to take an "indefinite hiatus." Lead singer Francis Mark commented on the break:

"At this point I feel that we have accomplished everything we could have hoped for with FATA. It doesn't feel much like a break up. Just feels like the end. It's complete. I would say that we are going on indefinite hiatus because the term breakup suggests a more negative circumstance. There have been no quarrels between band members. It is also not a question of fan support because we are lucky to have some of the most loyal and impassioned friends a band could ask for. Thank you again for the overwhelming support of our last album."

— From Autumn to Ashes, "From Autumn to Ashes takes 'Indefinite Hiatus'". JustPressPlay.net. June 9, 2008.

Mark and Lauritsen started the band Warship, which released one album and announced its breakup on their Myspace page December 30, 2009. Soon after, Mark formed the band Tidal Arms with friends Tom Tierney and Patrick Southern. Deneeve and Emanuel singer Matthew Breen came together to create the band Summer Law, which was disbanded after several months so that Deneeve could focus on attending culinary academy in hopes of becoming a Master Pastry Chef. Gretz announced his return to drumming for the band Zao, and is a member of Emanuel and the Fear.

In the meanwhile Brian Deneeve joined the UK boyband The Wanted as one of the guitarists for their backing band. Later he formed a new band called Get Involved which consists of Tucker Rule (Thursday), Derrick Karg, Todd Weinstock (Glassjaw) and Marcus Russell Price.

=== Reunion (2014–present) ===
The band's Twitter account tweeted for the first time on October 13, 2014. All the tweet contained was a picture of the band's debut album Too Bad You're Beautiful. No information can be found on why they did this or what it means.

Later on November 4, 2014, they posted a lyric line from the song "Kansas City 90210" which contains ""If I wanted to make a comeback would kids receive me? Unemployment, I've been ruined by young hands clapping." which supports the speculation of the band's possible reunion.

On November 26, 2014, it was announced the band would be reuniting at Amnesia Rockfest in June 2015, stating that more shows would be announced soon after.

On July 7, 2015, vocalist Francis Mark was charged in Michigan with maintaining a drug house. In a public statement, Mark addressed the charge, saying:

I wanted clarify a few things in the press and express my gratitude to the fans who continue to stick by us in these trying times. I turned myself in and was not arrested. The alleged drug house in question was merely a medicinal marijuana facility. I speak not only for myself but on behalf of From Autumn To Ashes that we will make up the dates as soon as we possibly can. Thank you for the years of support and see you soon.

In March 2020, the band confirmed a second string of reunion shows, their first in four years. However, due to the ongoing COVID-19 pandemic, both the first show in June and the second show in September were canceled or rescheduled. The band did confirm that it would play the rescheduled May 2021 dates of Furnace Fest.

In a live interview on Twitch, and later uploaded to YouTube, drummer Jeff Gretz confirmed that the second post-hiatus reunion was stipulated on writing new music and that the band had indeed been writing new songs, although uncertain of what would ultimately come of the writing sessions.

On September 19, 2023, the band shared a short teaser video on social media. A few days later, on September 22, it was announced that the band would be embarking on a short tour of the East Coast in November and December later that year. These shows were the band's first since December 2021.

FATA played a show in New York, early 2025, together with Thoughtcrimes and LaMacchia.

== Musical style and influences ==
The band's styles includes emo, screamo, post-hardcore, and metalcore. Kerrang! referred to them as simply "hardcore", as well as a "MySpace band".

For his stylistic influences for playing drums, Mark references Stewart Copeland of The Police who he "always thought ... had a really good style", Neil Peart of Rush, John Bonham of Led Zeppelin, and Keith Moon of The Who. Following the release of The Fiction We Live, then screaming vocalist Perri explained that the lyrics he was writing for the forthcoming album (Abandon Your Friends) would feature lyrics that were inspired by Billy Joel, stating that they were "billyjoelesque" because "they're more straightforward, not what I'm thinking, what I'm feeling, instead of poetry and shit". However, it is unclear whether the lyrics were used on the album, as was revealed by Mark in 2007, that Perri had not contributed to Abandon Your Friends and it was Mark who had ghostwritten the lyrics. Other influences they have cited include A.R.E. Weapons, Further Seems Forever, On the Might of Princes, Glassjaw, Mötley Crüe, Black Sabbath and Iron Maiden.

From Autumn to Ashes also combines genres as Mark has said, The combinations of genres allows them to tour with a variety of bands with different styles. They are able to "go on tour with Taking Back Sunday one month and go on tour with Shadows Fall the next month."

== Band members ==
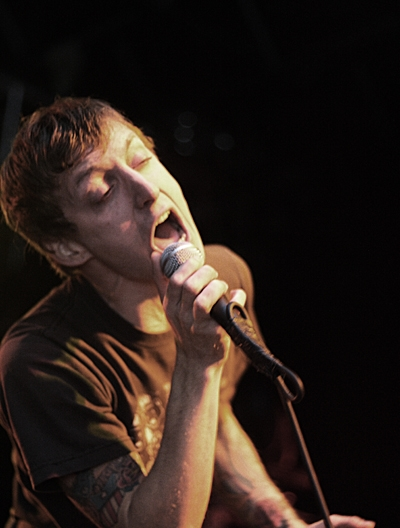
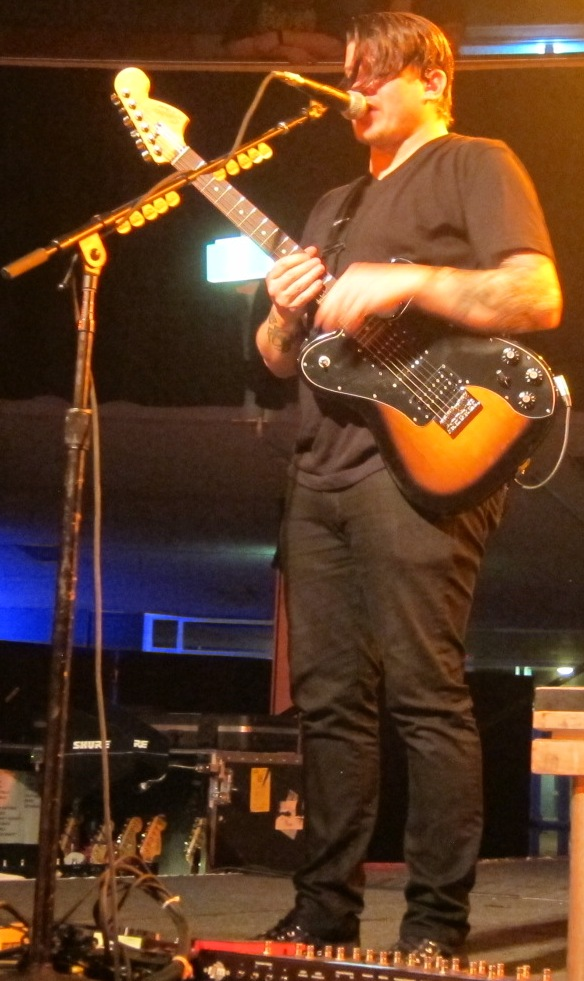
Three of the members of From Autumn to Ashes, from left to right: vocalist Francis Mark, former guitarist Scott Gross and former bassist Josh Newton

Current members

- Francis Mark – clean vocals (2000–2008; 2014–present); unclean vocals (2006–2008; 2014–present); piano (2001–2008; 2014–present); drums (2000–2006)
- Brian Deneeve – lead guitar, backing vocals (2001–2008; 2014–present)
- Mike Pilato – bass, backing vocals (2000–2004; 2007–2008; 2014-present)
- Rob Lauritsen – rhythm guitar (2006–2008; 2014–present)
- Jeff Gretz – drums, unclean vocals (2007–2008; 2014–present); additional guitars (2020–present)

Former members

- Benjamin Perri – unclean vocals (2000–2006)
- Stephen Salvio – lead guitar (2000–2001)
- Scott Gross – rhythm guitar (2000–2004)
- Jonathan Cox – rhythm guitar (2004–2006)
- Josh Newton – bass guitar, backing vocals (2004–2007)

== Discography ==
=== Studio albums ===
Year	Title	Label	Chart peaks	
Year	Title	Label	US	US Indie
2001	Too Bad You're Beautiful	Ferret	—	—
2003	The Fiction We Live	Vagrant	73	5
2005	Abandon Your Friends	Vagrant	58	4
2007	Holding a Wolf by the Ears	Vagrant	74	8

=== EPs ===
Year	Title	Label	Notes
2000	Sin, Sorrow and Sadness	Tribunal	
2005	The Bled/From Autumn to Ashes	Vagrant	Split EP with The Bled
2007	These Speakers Don't Always Tell the Truth	Vagrant	
2007	Stitches/Deth Kult Social Club	Solid State/Vagrant	Split 7-inch EP with Haste the Day

=== Live albums ===
Year	Title	Label
2008	Live at Looney Tunes	Vagrant

=== Music videos ===
Year	Song	Album
2001	"The Royal Crown vs. Blue Duchess"	Too Bad You're Beautiful
2003	"Milligram Smile"	The Fiction We Live
2003	"The After Dinner Payback"	The Fiction We Live
2004	"Lilacs & Lolita"	The Fiction We Live
2005	"Where Do You Draw the Line"	Abandon Your Friends
2007	"Pioneers"	Holding a Wolf by the Ears
2007	"Deth Kult Social Club"	Holding a Wolf by the Ears

=== Compilation and soundtrack appearances ===
Year	Song	Album	Label
2003	"Chloroform Perfume (Acoustic)"	Punk Goes Acoustic	Fearless
2003	"The After Dinner Payback"	Freddy vs. Jason Original Motion Picture Soundtrack	Roadrunner
2003	"Lilacs & Lolita"	American Chopper Video Game Soundtrack	Vagrant
2004	"Territorial Pissings (live; Nirvana cover)"	Another Year On the Streets, Vol. 3	Vagrant
2005	"Betwixt Her Getaway Sticks"	Masters of Horror Soundtrack	Immortal
2005	"Let's Have a War (Fear cover)	Tony Hawk's American Wasteland Soundtrack	Vagrant
2005	"Inapprope"	Cry Wolf: Music from and Inspired by the Film	Rogue
2007	"On the Offensive"	Saw IV Original Motion Picture Soundtrack	Artists' Addition
2007	"Love It or Left It"	ATV Offroad Fury 4 Soundtrack	Sony
2007	"Daylight Slaving"	Madden NFL 08 Soundtrack	Vagrant
