= One True Thing (band) =

American pop rock band

- Origin: Long Island, New York, United States
- Genres: Pop rock Power pop Pop punk
- Years active: 1994–2007
- Label: Play the Assassin Records
- Members: Milan Millevoy; Melanie Wills; Ray Greene; Mike Pilato
- Past members: Kris Heinssen; Antonio Longo
- Website: onetruething.net/ Domain expired, see external links for archived page

One True Thing, originally known as Scarab, was an American pop rock band from Long Island, New York. The band gained notable attention when lead singer, Melanie Wills, sang on two From Autumn to Ashes' songs, "Short Stories With Tragic Endings" and "Autumn’s Monologue."

== Band members ==
- Melanie Wills - vocals
- Milan Millevoy - guitar
- Mike Pilato - bass
- Ray Greene - drums

== Discography ==
=== Albums ===
Finally... (2002, reissued 2004)
