= Tribunal Records =

- Founded: 1999
- Founder: Matt Rudzinski
- Genre: Metal and Hardcore
- Country of origin: United States
- Official website: http://www.tribunalrecords.net/

Tribunal Records is a heavy metal and hardcore punk label that started in 1999. The label also has a subsidiary entitled Divebomb Records. Tribunal has hosted bands such as From the Shallows, Scarlet, and Century, while Divebomb hosts bands such as Wulfhook, Zephaniah, and Helion Prime.

== Current Artists ==
- Blatant Disarray
- Colossus
- Dr. Living Dead
- Enemy Is Us
- Forté
- Inferi
- Iron Thrones
- Jonas Sees in Color
- Jonin
- KONG!
- Line of Fire
- Labyrinthe
- Vanisher
- Wombwrecker

== Former Artists ==
=== Active ===
- Atreyu (Victory/Hollywood)
- Bloodjiin (Pluto)
- Century (Prosthetic)
- Daylight Dies (Relapse/Candlelight)
- Dreamscapes of the Perverse
- From Autumn to Ashes
- He Is Legend (Tragic Hero)
- Her Candane
- Last Chance to Reason (Prosthetic)
- Liferuiner (inVogue Records)
- Six Reasons to Kill (Massacre Records)
- Slowmotion Apocalypse (Scarlet Records)
- Swift
- The Demonstration (Mediaskare Records)
- Vale of Pnath (Willotip Records)
- Widow (Pure Steel Records)
- Woe of Tyrants (Metal Blade Records)

=== Disbanded ===
- Age of Ruin
- Animosity
- Brand New Disaster
- Canvas Solaris
- The Damascus Intervention
- Darkness Remains
- Deadsoil
- Everafter
- The Feds
- Killwhitneydead
- A Long Winter
- Nientara
- A Thousand Times Repent
- FaceDown
- Heartscarved
- Hyde
- Prayer for Cleansing

=== Hiatus or Unknown ===
- Adios
- Amazing Device
- The Cardinal Effect
- From the Shallows
- The Kiss of Death
- Samadhi
- Scarlet (Ferret Music)
- A Secret Death
- Sever the Fallen
- Since the Day
- The Taste of Blood
- The Underwater
