= Dashboard Confessional discography =

Band discography

- Studio albums: 8
- EPs: 6
- Live albums: 1
- Compilation albums: 1
- Singles: 15

The discography of Dashboard Confessional, an American rock band, consists of eight studio albums, one live album, one compilation album, six extended plays and 13 singles.

== Albums ==
=== Studio albums ===
Title	Details	Peak chart positions								Sales	Certifications (sales threshold)
Title	Details	US	US Indie	US Rock	AUS	CAN	GER	UK	UK Indie	Sales	Certifications (sales threshold)
The Swiss Army Romance	Released: March 2000; Label: Fiddler; Format: CD, CS, DL, LP	— (Note: The Swiss Army Romance did not enter the US Billboard 200, but peaked at number 39 on the US Heatseekers Albums Chart.)	—	—	—	—	—	—	—		
The Places You Have Come to Fear the Most	Released: March 20, 2001; Label: Vagrant; Format: CD, DL, LP	108	5	—	—	—	—	— (Note: The Places You Have Come to Fear the Most did not enter the UK Albums Chart, but peaked at number 28 on the UK Vinyl Albums Chart.)	39	US: 399,000+	RIAA: Gold
A Mark, a Mission, a Brand, a Scar	Released: August 12, 2003; Label: Vagrant; Format: CD, CD+DVD-V, CS, DL, LP	2	1	—	61	—	—	93	—	US: 922,000+	RIAA: Gold
Dusk and Summer	Released: June 27, 2006; Label: Vagrant; Format: CD, CD+DVD-V, CS, DL, LP	2	—	1	22	6	52	91	5	US: 559,000+	RIAA: Gold
The Shade of Poison Trees	Released: October 2, 2007; Label: Vagrant; Format: CD, DL, LP	18	1	6	83	—	—	173	14	US: 152,000+	
Alter the Ending	Released: November 10, 2009; Label: Vagrant/DGC/Interscope; Format: CD, DL, LP	19	—	6	—	—	—	—	—		
Crooked Shadows	Released: February 9, 2018; Label: Fueled by Ramen; Format: CD, DL, LP	53	—	4	—	—	—	—	—		
All the Truth That I Can Tell	Released: February 25, 2022; Label: Hidden Note, AWAL; Format: CD, DL, LP	— (Note: All the Truth That I Can Tell did not enter the US Billboard 200, but peaked at number 39 on the Top Album Sales Chart.)	—	—	—	—	—	—	—		
"—" denotes releases that did not chart

=== Live albums ===
Title	Details	Peak chart positions		Certifications (sales threshold)
Title	Details	US	US Indie	Certifications (sales threshold)
MTV Unplugged 2.0	Released: December 17, 2002; Label: Vagrant (VR378); Format: CD+DVD-V	111	1	RIAA: Platinum

=== Compilation albums ===
Title	Details
The Wire Tapes Vol. 1	Released: September 2007; Label: Self-released; Format: CD
The Best Ones of the Best Ones	Released: January 31, 2020; Label: Hidden Note; Format: CD, DL, LP

== EPs ==
Title	EP details
The Drowning EP	Released: February 27, 2001; Label: Fiddler (FR0012); Format: CD, DL
So Impossible EP	Released: December 18, 2001; Label: Vagrant (VR362); Format: CD, DL
Summers Kiss EP	Released: April 2, 2002; Label: Eulogy (ER36); Format: CD, DL
Sessions@AOL	Released: August 29, 2006; Label: Vagrant; Format: DL
Swiss Army Bro-Mance (split EP with New Found Glory)	Released: February 1, 2010; Label: Epitaph (ER36); Format: 7" vinyl
Covered and Taped	Released: January 18, 2017; Label: Self-released; Format: DL

== Singles ==
Title	Year	Peak chart positions										Album
Title	Year	US	US Alt	US Pop	AUS	CAN	CAN Rock	GER	NZ	SCO	UK	Album
"Screaming Infidelities"	2002	—	22	—	—	—	—	—	—	—	—	The Places You Have Come to Fear the Most
"Saints and Sailors"	2002	—	—	—	—	—	—	—	—	—	—	The Places You Have Come to Fear the Most
"Hands Down"	2003	—	8	—	—	—	—	93	—	80	60	A Mark, a Mission, a Brand, a Scar
"Rapid Hope Loss"	2004	—	37	—	—	—	—	—	—	77	75	A Mark, a Mission, a Brand, a Scar
"Vindicated"	2004	— (Note: "Vindicated" did not enter the Billboard Hot 100, but peaked at number three on the Bubbling Under Hot 100 Singles chart.)	2	31	46	80	14	—	23	—	—	Music from and Inspired by Spider-Man 2
"Don't Wait"	2006	80	17	64	—	—	—	—	—	62	68	Dusk and Summer
"Rooftops and Invitations"	2006	—	—	—	—	—	—	—	—	—	—	Dusk and Summer
"Stolen"	2007	44	—	28	—	—	—	15	—	—	—	Dusk and Summer
"Thick as Thieves"	2007	—	—	—	—	—	—	—	—	—	—	The Shade of Poison Trees
"These Bones"	2008	—	—	—	—	—	—	—	—	—	—	The Shade of Poison Trees
"Belle of the Boulevard"	2009	—	—	— (Note: "Belle of the Boulevard" did not enter the Pop Airplay chart, but peaked at number 36 on the Adult Pop Songs chart.)	—	—	—	—	—	—	—	Alter the Ending
"We Fight"	2017	—	14	—	—	—	41	—	—	—	—	Crooked Shadows
"Belong" (with Cash Cash)	2017	—	—	—	—	—	—	—	—	—	—	Crooked Shadows
"Heart Beat Here"	2018	—	—	—	—	—	—	—	—	—	—	Crooked Shadows
"KindaYeahSorta"	2018	—	—	—	—	—	—	—	—	—	—	Non-album single
"Here's to Moving On"	2021	—	—	—	—	—	—	—	—	—	—	All the Truth I Can Tell
"Burning Heart"	2022	—	—	—	—	—	—	—	—	—	—	All the Truth I Can Tell
"—" denotes releases that did not chart

== Other charting songs ==
Title	Year	Peak chart positions	Album
Title	Year	US DL	Album
"In a Big Country"	2007	59	"Stolen" single

== Other appearances ==
Title	Year	Album
"Jamie" (Weezer cover)	2002	Rock Music: A Tribute to Weezer
"Screaming Infidelities" (remix)	2002	MTV2 Handpicked
"The Only Gift That I Need"	2002	Kevin & Bean's Fo' Shizzle St. Nizzle
"Warmth of the Sand"	2004	Another Year on the Streets Vol.3
"Don't Wait" (Target SXSW acoustic performance)	2006	The Target Red Room Volume 5
"Finishing School"	2009	Jennifer's Body
"Screaming Infidelities (Acoustic)" (featuring Abigail Sevigny)	2019	Punk Goes Acoustic Vol. 3
