= We Fight =

Single by Dashboard Confessional

from the album Crooked Shadows
- Released: November 15, 2017
- Genre: Alternative rock; emo
- Length: 3:25
- Label: Fueled by Ramen
- Songwriter: Chris Carrabba
- Producers: Chris Carrabba; Jonathan Clark

Dashboard Confessional singles chronology
"Belle of the Boulevard" (2009)	"We Fight" (2017)

"We Fight" is a song by the American rock band Dashboard Confessional, the first single off of their seventh studio album Crooked Shadows. The song was released on November 15, 2017, the band's first new song in over eight years. Written by lead singer Chris Carrabba, the song has been described by Carrabba as being about "beliefs worth protecting, worth standing up for."

== Background and recording ==
After the release of 2009's Alter the Ending, Dashboard Confessional did not officially release new original material for over eight years. In an interview with Beats 1's Zane Lowe, Carrabba stated that "We Fight" originated as a personal song, saying "I found a place in the world, which was worth fighting for, which was the music scene that I come from. I wasn’t cool in school. I didn’t fit in. I found this music scene and it fostered this community and it fostered the people in it." Following the election of Donald Trump in 2016, Carrabba took note of his administration's regressive policies, which appeared to undo the progress that had been made in prior years.

Regarding the title, Carrabba said, "As this album was coming together I realized, especially as the world’s political climate was rapidly changing, that 'personal' did not necessarily mean 'mine' – suddenly, 'me' became 'we' and that realization was empowering, comforting and terrifying all at once."

== Release ==
"We Fight" was released on November 15, 2017. The song impacted alternative radio stations on November 28, 2017. It has peaked at No. 14 on the Alternative Songs chart, the band's first single to chart there since "Don't Wait" in 2007 and the band's highest-peaking single since "Vindicated" reached No. 2 in 2004.

== Track listing ==
Digital single
No.	Title	Writer(s)	Length
1.	"We Fight"	Chris Carrabba	3:25

== Charts ==
Chart (2017–18)	Peak position
US Alternative Airplay (Billboard)	14
