= MTV Unplugged 2.0 =

Live album by Dashboard Confessional
- Released: December 17, 2002
- Genres: Emo, acoustic rock
- Length: 52:28
- Label: Vagrant
- Producers: Mike Fisher, Alex Coletti

Dashboard Confessional chronology
| The Places You Have Come to Fear the Most (2001) | MTV Unplugged 2.0 (2002) | A Mark, a Mission, a Brand, a Scar (2003) |

Singles from MTV Unplugged 2.0
- 1. "Screaming Infidelities" Released: 2002

MTV Unplugged 2.0 is a live album released by the American emo band Dashboard Confessional on December 17, 2002, through Vagrant Records. This CD/DVD package is the band's first live album. "Screaming Infidelities" was released as a single.

== Songs ==
The songs featured on this album are slightly changed and are more up-beat versions of the songs from Dashboard Confessional's previous albums, The Swiss Army Romance and The Places You Have Come to Fear the Most and their So Impossible EP.

This is the first time Dashboard Confessional performs the tracks "Remember to Breathe", "The Sharp Hint of New Tears, "So Impossible", "Turpentine Chaser", "Living in Your Letters", "For You to Notice" and "Hands Down" as a full band unlike the ones on their original albums which featured only Chris Carrabba, who is sometimes accompanied by John Lefler.

== Reception ==
Professional ratings
Review scores
| Source | Rating |
|---|---|
| AllMusic | 3/5 stars |
| Blender | 3/5 stars |
| Drowned in Sound | 4.5/5 stars |
| Entertainment Weekly | B+ |
| NME | 7/10 |
| Rolling Stone | 2/5 stars |
| Spin | 8/10 |

MTV Unplugged 2.0 sold 34,000 copies in its first week, and 149,000 copies by August 2003. After a few months, RIAA certified the album Platinum, indicating shipment of between 100,000 and 200,000 units, as it is considered a long-form video. The album is the first one to have peaked at #1 on the Top Heatseekers chart and the Top Independent Albums chart. The album peaked at #111 on the Billboard 200.

== Track listing ==
All songs written by Chris Carrabba.

1. "The Swiss Army Romance" – 3:08
2. "The Best Deceptions" – 4:31
3. "Remember to Breathe" – 3:48
4. "The Good Fight" – 2:30
5. "The Sharp Hint of New Tears" – 2:54
6. "So Impossible" – 3:03
7. "The Places You Have Come to Fear the Most" – 3:11
8. "Turpentine Chaser" – 3:46
9. "Living in Your Letters" – 4:31
10. "For You to Notice" – 4:53
11. "The Brilliant Dance" – 3:18
12. "Screaming Infidelities" – 3:44
13. "Saints and Sailors" – 2:33
14. "Again I Go Unnoticed" – 2:43
15. "Hands Down" – 3:56

== Personnel ==
Personnel per booklet.

Dashboard Confessional

- Chris Carrabba – vocals, guitar
- Johnny Lefler – guitar, piano
- Dan Bonebrake – bass
- Mike Marsh – drums

DVD credits

- Alex Coletti – producer, surround sound mixing
- Adam Blackburn – recording
- John Harris – mixing
- Max Feldman – mixing
- Chris Shaw – remixing

CD credits

- Chris Shaw – mixing
- Steve Sisco – assistant
- Alex Coletti – additional production
- Scott Gries – photography
- Keath Moon – design

== Chart performance ==
| Chart | Peak position |
|---|---|
| US Heatseekers Albums (Billboard) | 1 |
| US Independent Albums (Billboard) | 1 |
| US Billboard 200 | 111 |
