= Hands Down =

Hands Down may refer to:

== Film ==
- Hands Down (film), a 1918 silent film directed by Rupert Julian

== Music ==
- Hands Down (album), by Bob James
- "Hands Down" (song), by Dashboard Confessional
- "Hands Down", by Dan Hartman, 1979
- "Hands Down", by Dog Is Dead, 201

== Game ==
- Hands Down (game), children's board game introduced in 1964
