= Crooked Shadows =

Studio album by Dashboard Confessional
- Released: February 9, 2018
- Genre: Emo; alternative rock
- Length: 29:37
- Label: Fueled by Ramen

Dashboard Confessional chronology
Covered and Taped (2017)	Crooked Shadows (2018)	All the Truth That I Can Tell (2022)

Crooked Shadows is the seventh studio album by American rock band Dashboard Confessional. It was released on February 9, 2018 through Fueled by Ramen and Dine Alone Records. It is their first studio album in nine years, following 2009's Alter the Ending.

The album debuted at number 53 on the Billboard 200, as well as number four on both the Billboard Rock Albums and Alternative Albums charts.

== Release ==
On November 15, 2017, "We Fight" premiered on Beats 1. Alongside this, Crooked Shadows was announced for release in February the following year. On December 18, a music video was released for "Belong", directed by Joe Zohar. Two days later, a music video was released for "We Fight", directed by David Mack. In early January 2018, the band performed the track on Conan. On January 19, "Heart Beat Here" was made available for streaming. Crooked Shadows was released on February 9 through Fueled by Ramen.

In February and March 2018, the group embarked on a headlining US tour with support from Beach Slang. In August, they went on a co-headlining US tour with All Time Low. A second leg was planned to follow in September and October, however, the day before this was to start, the band pulled out of a few days due to Carrabba dealing with a family emergency. Four days later, the group pulled out of the second leg entirely. On November 15, a music video was released for "Just What to Say", directed by Ryan Hamblin.

== Critical reception ==
Professional ratings
Aggregate scores
Source	Rating
Metacritic	57/100
Review scores
Source	Rating
AllMusic	3.5/5 stars
Clash	8/10
Drowned in Sound	8/10
Exclaim!	6/10
Pitchfork	4.7/10
Rolling Stone	3/5 stars

Crooked Shadows was met with "mixed or average" reviews from critics. At Metacritic, which assigns a weighted average rating out of 100 to reviews from mainstream publications, this release received an average score of 57, based on 9 reviews. Aggregator Album of the Year gave the album 60 out of 100 based on a critical consensus of 9 reviews.

== Track listing ==
All tracks are written by Chris Carrabba, except where noted.

No.	Title	Writer(s)	Length
1.	"We Fight"		3:25
2.	"Catch You"		3:06
3.	"About Us"	Carrabba; Jonathan Clark; Ross Copperman; Ryan Follese	3:36
4.	"Heart Beat Here"		3:27
5.	"Belong" (with Cash Cash)		2:58
6.	"Crooked Shadows"	Carrabba; Armon Jay Cheek; Jonathan Howard	2:49
7.	"Open My Eyes" (featuring Lindsey Stirling)	Carrabba; Mark Webb	3:43
8.	"Be Alright"	Carrabba; Corey James Bost; Clark	3:02
9.	"Just What to Say" (featuring Chrissy Costanza of Against The Current)	Carrabba; Cheek	3:31

== Personnel ==
Dashboard Confessional

- Chris Carrabba – lead vocals, guitar, keyboard
- Benjamin Homola – drums, percussion
- Armon Jay – guitar, backing vocals
- Scott Schoenbeck – bass, keyboard

Technical personnel

- Jonathan Clark – producer, engineer
- Chris Carrabba – producer
- Jonathan Howard – producer and engineer (track 6), additional instrumentation
- Colin Brittain – co-producer, mixing, additional instrumentation
- Chad Gilbert – additional production (track 2)
- Cash Cash – producer and mixing (track 5)
- Ben Sabin – recording, additional mixing, additional instrumentation
- Ted Jensen – mastering
- Jack Barakat – additional instrumentation
- Lee Cunningham – additional instrumentation
- Dylan Meek – additional instrumentation
- Cheyenne Sabin – additional instrumentation

== Charts ==
Chart (2018)	Peak position
US Billboard 200	53
US Top Rock Albums (Billboard)	4
US Top Alternative Albums (Billboard)	4
