= Dusk and Summer =

Studio album by Dashboard Confessional
- Released: June 27, 2006
- Recorded: April 2005 – March 2006
- Studios: NRG; Avatar; Pilot; Mission Sound; Quad Studios; The Loft; La Bella Vista
- Genres: Arena rock, pop rock, emo
- Length: 40:36
- Label: Vagrant
- Producers: Don Gilmore, Daniel Lanois, Gil Norton

Dashboard Confessional chronology
A Mark, a Mission, a Brand, a Scar (2003)	Dusk and Summer (2006)	The Shade of Poison Trees (2007)

Singles from Dusk and Summer
- 1. "Don't Wait" Released: May 23, 2006; 2. "Rooftops and Invitations" Released: August 29, 2006; 3. "Stolen" Released: July 25, 2007

Dusk and Summer is the fourth studio album by American rock band Dashboard Confessional. It was released on June 27, 2006, debuting at #2 on the Billboard 200 chart. The album was released to mixed reception from critics.

== Background ==
With the release of A Mark, a Mission, a Brand, a Scar (2003), Dashboard Confessional solidified its line-up of vocalist/guitarist Chris Carrabba, bassist Scott Schoenbeck, guitarist John Lefler and drummer Mike Marsh. The album charted at number two on the Billboard 200 and its single "Hands Down" reached number eight on the Alternative Songs chart. The group contributed the track "Vindicated", which was produced by Don Gilmore and Gil Norton, to the Spider-Man 2 soundtrack released in June 2004. Later that month, a live recording of a new track "So Long, So Long" appeared on the group's website. The track marked a change from their past work as it included a piano. Carrabba said the next album would be a piano-driven effort with contributions from the other members. Following this, Carrabba spent the rest of the summer writing material for a new album.

In December, the group got together and played through the songs they had. Though Carrabba considered a lot of it unsatisfactory, he figured out the vibe for the next album: "I have this passionate desire to sort of explore space ... [as opposed to] compounding everything into these driving parts." In February 2005, Carrabba scrapped an album's worth of songs as he felt they were too safe: "[F]ans probably would have liked those songs. And people who weren't would have had the same complaints as ever." Carrabba spent two weeks in Florida making several batches of demos of over 30 songs. He rediscovered the material he had written for his previous bands Further Seems Forever and The Vacant Andies, and decided to write tracks that combined elements from them and Dashboard. After another four weeks, he had written a whole new album.

== Production ==
Through a mutual friend, some of the demos ended up in the hands of producer Daniel Lanois. The demos inspired him to come out of retirement, which he had been in since working on All That You Can't Leave Behind (2000) by U2. Despite having already having plans to record, Carrabba was invited to Jamaica, where Lanois was, to discuss the songs. He flew out and the pair spent a week talking about songs. A day after returning home, Lanois was interested in producing the album. In April, the group worked with Lanois and recorded 20 songs. Half of them at Lanois' home in Toronto, Canada, and the other half at Lanois' other home in Silver Lake, California. Sessions also took place at NRG, Avatar, Pilot, Mission Sound, Quad Studios, The Loft and La Bella Vista. Mark Kiczula acted as the main engineer with assistance from Jim Keller, Chad Lupo, Guiliano Baglioni, Roberto Fulps and Matt Shane. Additional engineering was done by Fox Phelps, Adam Samuels and Daniel Mendez.

Carrabba experimented with a variety of instruments from mandolins to metal flowers pots that substituted as drums. At the end of the month, Carrabba went on a solo tour of colleges and debuted some of the new songs. In September, the group supported U2 on their North American tour. In between these support dates, the group performed a few club shows. Prior to starting the tour, Carrabba said the album required mixing. Despite this, material was still being recorded up to January 2006. Lanois left the project; Carrabba wanted to record another track, at which point Gilmore was brought in. Carrabba subsequently went on a song writing binge, creating six songs across four days. Sometime afterwards, Carrabba decided to rework the Lanois-produced material with Gilmore, while retaining some of Lanois' contributions. In March, Gilmore and Carrabba recorded an album's worth of songs.

Gilmore is credited as producing the majority of the album, with the exception of "Heaven Here" which is credited to him and Lanois. Lanois also received a producer credit for the vocals on "Reason to Believe". Marsh said that due to the structure of the songs and melodies, the recording process give him a "great opportunity to create space." Andy Wallace mixed all of the album, except for "Don't Wait" (mixed by Gilmore), at Soundtrack Studios in New York City. He was aided by Pro Tools engineer John O'Mahony and assisted by Mike Scielzi, Paul Suarez ad Jan Petrov. Ted Jensen mastered the recordings at Sterling Sound. Adam Duritz of Counting Crows provided additional vocals on "So Long, So Long", while Susan Sherouse contributed violin and vocals. Carrabba had met Duritz while the pair were playing at a benefit concert.

== Composition ==
Discussing the album title, Carrabba and his family used to drive an hour and sit on a beach. Eventually, he "just kept finding myself back there, finding inspiration." Musically, Dusk and Summer has been described as arena rock, pop rock, alternative rock, emo and scene music, channelling the guitarwork of U2 guitarist the Edge, and the vocal wailing of the Cure frontman Robert Smith. The song arrangements build on the rock sound of A Mark, a Mission, a Brand, a Scar and Carrabba's former band Further Seems Forever, incorporating more piano and violin parts, recalling the work of Coldplay and Journey. The Sixpence None the Richer-esque track "Don't Wait" was written in a dressing room on the U2 tour. It was completed in a few minutes; he said it talked about "seizing and acting on what you dream, not just dreaming about it." "Stolen" tackles the theme of unrequited love, while "So Long, So Long" is a piano-centric track about leaving one's hometown. "Slow Decay" is about a soldier readjusting to home life after returning from war. It was based on two friends of Carrabba's and a third person, who he witnessed on 60 Minutes. His vocal was noted as being reminiscent of My Chemical Romance frontman Gerard Way. "Dusk and Summer" was written at the eleventh hour and summarised all of the parts of the album; it recalled the group's earlier material. "Heaven Here" wasn't intended for inclusion on the record until Lanois heard it and convinced Carrabba to write lyrics for it.

== Release ==
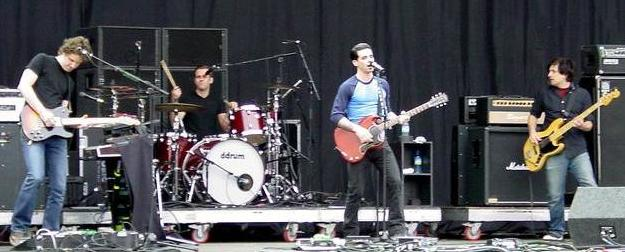
Dashboard Confessional performing at the Reading Festival, August 26, 2006

On April 8, 2006, the group's next album was announced for release in June and the track listing was revealed. On May 5, the album's title was announced as Dusk and Summer. Around this time, a music video was filmed for "Don't Wait" in California with director Rich Lee. The video features Fernanda Romero and Carrabba; Carrabba makes a choice and breaks up with her, before he is pulled "at light-speed through time, almost to the end of the world". Throughout the video, he realizes his mistake and is taken back to undo what he did. The track was available to download from their website on May 18, before being released to radio on May 23. Following this, they appeared at the HFStival and did an AOL Session, where they performed "Don't Wait". A music video for "Don't Wait" was released on June 6. Dusk and Summer was made available for streaming via AOL on June 26, 2006, before being released a day later through Vagrant Records.

The Target edition included a DVD, which featured three live performances and an interview. In early July, the band went on a tour of Canada with Say Anything and Ben Lee, followed by a US tour running into August. "Rooftops and Invitations" was released to radio on August 29. The group went on a European tour, before embarking on a tour of Australia. Following this, they appeared at the Bamboozle Left festival. From mid-October to early December 2006, the band went on a US tour alongside Brand New. On December 11, 2006, the band appeared on Late Night with Conan O'Brien; they also featured on Loaded on February 7, 2007. Dusk and Summer was reissued on May 22, 2007. This edition included a new version of "Stolen", "Vindicated" and live versions of "Ghost of a Good Thing" and "The Best Deceptions". It was promoted with an appearance on The Tonight Show with Jay Leno. "Stolen" was released in Australia as a CD single on July 25, which featured two versions of "Stolen", and a cover of "In a Big Country" by Big Country.

== Reception ==
Professional ratings
Aggregate scores
Source	Rating
Metacritic	60/100
Review scores
Source	Rating
AllMusic	4/5 stars
The A.V. Club	C−
Entertainment Weekly	B
The Guardian	2/5 stars
IGN	6.4/10
musicOMH	3/5 stars
Okayplayer	77/100
PopMatters	4/10 stars
Rolling Stone	3.5/5 stars
Stylus Magazine	C+

Dusk and Summer debuted at number 2 on the Billboard 200 chart, selling 134,000 copies in its first week. By August 2006, the album had sold over 300,000 copies.

== Track listing ==
All songs written by Chris Carrabba.

0. "Write It Out" – 4:51 (pregap hidden track)
0. "Vindicated" – 3:20 (pregap hidden track)
1. "Don't Wait" – 4:05
2. "Reason to Believe" – 3:43
3. "The Secret's in the Telling" – 3:24
4. "Stolen" – 3:53
5. "Rooftops and Invitations" – 3:54
6. "So Long, So Long" – 4:15
7. "Currents" – 4:27
8. "Slow Decay" – 4:08
9. "Dusk and Summer" – 4:38
10. "Heaven Here" – 4:08

UK/iTunes bonus track
No.	Title	Length
11.	"Vindicated"	3:20

Europe bonus track
No.	Title	Length
11.	"Stolen" (featuring Juli)	3:19

Deluxe edition
No.	Title	Length
1.	"Don't Wait"	4:05
2.	"Reason to Believe"	3:43
3.	"The Secret's in the Telling"	3:24
4.	"Vindicated"	3:20
5.	"Stolen" (radio edit) (non-Juli version)	3:19
6.	"Rooftops and Invitations"	3:54
7.	"So Long, So Long"	4:15
8.	"Currents"	4:27
9.	"Slow Decay"	4:08
10.	"Dusk and Summer"	4:38
11.	"Heaven Here"	4:08
12.	"Ghost of a Good Thing" (live from The Henry Rollins Show)	4:11
13.	"The Best Deceptions" (live from The Henry Rollins Show)	5:31

== Personnel ==
Personnel per booklet.

Dashboard Confessional

- Chris Carrabba – lead vocals, guitar, keys
- Scott Schoenbeck – bass
- John Lefler – lead guitar, keys
- Mike Marsh – drums, percussion

Additional musicians

- Adam Duritz – additional vocals (track 7 "So Long, So Long")
- Susan Sherouse – violin, vocals

Production

- Don Gilmore – producer, mixing (track 1)
- Andy Wallace – mixing
- Daniel Lanois – vocal producer (track 2), producer (track 10)
- Mark Kiczula – engineer
- Fox Phelps – additional engineer
- Adam Samuels – additional engineer
- Daniel Mendez – additional engineer
- Jim Keller – assistant engineer
- Chad Lupo – assistant engineer
- Guiliano Baglioni – assistant engineer
- Roberto Fulps – assistant engineer
- Matt Shane – assistant engineer
- John O'Mahony – mix Pro Tools engineer
- Mike Scielzi – mixing assistant
- Paul Suarez – mixing assistant
- Jan Petrov – mixing assistant
- Ted Jensen – mastering
- Marina Chavez – photography
- Blake Sinclair – additional photography
- Ben Goetting – design

== Charts ==
=== Weekly charts ===
Weekly chart performance for Dusk and Summer
Chart (2006)	Peak position
Australian Albums (ARIA)	22
Canadian Albums (Billboard)	6
German Albums (Offizielle Top 100)	52
UK Albums (Official Charts)	91
US Billboard 200	2
US Top Rock Albums (Billboard)	1

=== Year-end charts ===
Year-end chart performance for Dusk and Summer
Chart (2006)	Position
US Billboard 200	183

== Certifications ==
Certifications for Dusk and Summer
Region	Certification	Certified units/sales
United States (RIAA)	Gold	500,000^{^}
^{^} Shipments figures based on certification alone.
