= Pass the Flask =

Studio album by The Bled
- Released: July 29, 2003
- Recorded: 2003
- Genre: Post-hardcore; screamo; metalcore
- Length: 38:15
- Label: Fiddler
- Producer: Beau Burchell

The Bled chronology
The Bled (2002)	Pass the Flask (2003)	Found in the Flood (2005)

Professional ratings
Review scores
Source	Rating
AllMusic	2.5/5 stars
HCS.net	5/5 stars

Pass the Flask is the first studio album by American post-hardcore band The Bled. The album was released on July 29, 2003.

== Reissue ==
The Bled originally released their first album on Fiddler Records, an independent, now defunct record label. Pass the Flask sold approx 50,000 copies while on Fiddler. The Bled then signed to Vagrant Records to release their second album, Found in the Flood. They reissued the first album on their new label Vagrant Records, containing all of the songs from Pass the Flask, as well as the almost impossible to find His First Crush and The Bled EPs and officially unreleased tracks that only family and friends had. Jeremy Talley, the guitarist, said that "it seemed like the right time to put them all on one disc and put it out there before too many people find out about the Internet." In the thanks section of the booklet, they say that they are "buying a Hummer" with the money from selling the CD twice.

== Track origins ==
The first ten songs make up the reissue, coming from Pass the Flask. Track 2 was originally entitled "Dale Earnhardt's Seatbelt", but was changed for legal reasons. It is still listed as "Dale Earnhardt's Seatbelt" in the liner notes. Tracks 11–15 are from His First Crush, 16–18 are from The Bled. Song 19, "Ok, But Here's How It Really Happened", has never been officially released before. Song 20, "Hotel Coral Essex" (original recording), is from a demo recorded for a 2004 Warped Tour sampler, although it was later added to and released on Found in the Flood. Finally, song 21, "Lay On My Cot", is said to have been "sent to us from deep space and shall never be spoken of again." The track "Ruth Buzzi Better Watch Her Back" is titled after a line of dialogue from the comedy Wet Hot American Summer. The track "Get Up You Son of a Bitch, Cause Mickey Loves Ya" is titled after a line of dialogue from Rocky.

== Track listing ==
- All songs written by The Bled.

No.	Title	Length
1.	"Red Wedding"	2:51
2.	"You Know Who's Seatbelt"	3:01
3.	"I Never Met Another Gemini"	4:11
4.	"Ruth Buzzi Better Watch Her Back"	3:30
5.	"Sound of Sulfur"	3:12
6.	"Porcelain Hearts and Hammers for Teeth"	5:33
7.	"Get Up You Son of a Bitch, Cause Mickey Loves Ya"	1:30
8.	"Spitshine Sonata"	3:30
9.	"We Are the Industry"	6:06
10.	"Nothing We Say Leaves This Room"	4:51
Total length:		38:15

=== Reissue bonus tracks ===
#	Song title	Time	Originally found on
11	"His First Crush"	3:08	His First Crush
12	"Anvil Piñata"	3:38	His First Crush
13	"Swatting Flies With A Wrecking Ball"	2:20	His First Crush
14	"Glitterbomb"	3:58	His First Crush
15	"F Is For Forensics"	4:28	His First Crush
16	"John Wayne Newton"	2:23	The Bled
17	"Meredith"	2:23	The Bled
18	"My Cyanide Catharsis" (Ft. Emily Long)	4:15	The Bled
19	"Ok, But Here's How It Really Happened"	3:01	Unreleased
20	"Hotel Coral Essex" (Original Recording)	3:29	Unreleased
21	"Lay On My Cot" (K-Note Freestyle Ft. MC JayRay)	2:16	Unreleased

== Credits ==
Original
The Bled

- James Muñoz – Vocals
- Jeremy Talley – Guitar
- Ross Ott – Guitar
- Mike Celi – Bass
- Mike Pedicone – Drums

Additional

- Beau Burchell – Engineering, production, mixing
- Ted Danson – Executive producer
- Shawn Sullivan – Mastering
- Ryan Joseph Shaughnessy – Photography

Reissue

- James Muñoz – Vocals
- Jeremy Talley – Guitar
- Ross Ott – Guitar
- Mike Pedicone – Drums
- Mike Celi – Bass
- Beau Burchell – Engineer
- Beau Burchell – Producer
- Beau Burchell – Mixer
- Ted Danson – Executive Producer
- RJ Shaughnessy – Photography
- Sergie – "Slapping The Art Together"
- Ben Goetting – Additional Layout
- Amy Fleisher, Rossmosis and Friends – Additional Photography
