= The Bled (EP) =

EP by the Bled
- Released: February 2, 2002
- Recorded: 2001
- Genre: Hardcore punk, mathcore
- Length: 13:29
- Label: Ambit
- Producer: The Bled

The Bled chronology
His First Crush (2001)	The Bled (2002)	Pass the Flask (2003)

The Bled is a self-titled EP by hardcore punk band the Bled. Its four songs were pressed on one-sided 12" vinyl, released in 2002 by Ambit Records. It was a small DIY release, without much marketing attempt. Production was limited to only 666 copies, 100 of which were on translucent blood-red vinyl. The other remaining 566 were pressed on black vinyl, and placed into black or white sleeves. The album art was sprayed on and the numbers handwritten. It was recorded before current singer James Munoz joined the band.

Before the bled's reputation grew, the guy (unknown) that funded this pressing project didn't make much attempt to sell them. Some of the earlier copies that were sold or given out had no art work on them at all. Later, as the band's success grew, the guy (still a mystery) that had them decided to spray paint the sleeves, hand number them, and started putting them out there to sell at places such as interpunk. The bled had no say so in the design of the simple art scheme that was painted on the sleeves.

== Content confusion ==
While originally intended as a self-titled release, The Bled has received a few other names as well. Some call it "the untitled album", "the one-sided album" or "that vinyl." Contrastingly, both the Pass the Flask (Reissue) booklet and the Vagrant website calls it the Ambulance Romance EP, from the name of the first song on the album.

Because the back of the sleeve is blank, this release's track names were considered a mystery by some. The song "Ambulance Romance" was musically and lyrically rewritten into "I Don't Keep With Liars Anymore" on Found in the Flood.

== Track listing ==
All songs by The Bled.

1. "Ambulance Romance" – 4:27
2. "John Wayne Newton" – 2:24
3. "Meredith" – 2:22
4. "My Cyanide Catharsis" (Ft. Emily Long) – 4:16

== Rarity ==
The Bled released Pass the Flask (Reissue), with all the songs from this EP except for "Ambulance Romance".

== Credits ==
- Mike Pedicone – drums
- Ross Ott – guitar
- Adam Goss – vocals
- Jeremy Talley – guitar
- Mike Celi – bass
