= Rapid Hope Loss =

Single by Dashboard Confessional

from the album A Mark, a Mission, a Brand, a Scar
- Released: May 4, 2004
- Label: Vagrant
- Songwriter: Chris Carrabba

Dashboard Confessional singles chronology
"Hands Down" (2003)	"Rapid Hope Loss" (2004)	"Vindicated" (2004)

"Rapid Hope Loss" is a song by Dashboard Confessional, released in 2004. "Rapid Hope Loss" was released to radio on December 9, 2003. It peaked at No. 75 in the UK and at No. 37 on the Billboard Modern Rock Tracks chart in the United States.

== Track listing ==
1. "Rapid Hope Loss" (album version) – 3:42
2. "Hold On" – 2:08
3. "This Is a Forgery" – 3:37

== Charts ==
Chart (2003–2004)	Peak position
UK Singles (Official Charts)	75
US Alternative Airplay (Billboard)	37
