= Screaming Infidelities =

2002 single by Dashboard Confessional

Single by Dashboard Confessional

from the album The Swiss Army Romance and The Places You Have Come to Fear the Most
- Released: January 15, 2002
- Genre: Emo
- Length: 3:33 (original version); 3:46 (reworked version)
- Label: Vagrant
- Songwriter: Chris Carrabba
- Producer: James Paul Wisner

Dashboard Confessional singles chronology
| "Screaming Infidelities" (2002) | "Saints and Sailors" (2002) |

"Screaming Infidelities" is the first single from Dashboard Confessional's 2001 album The Places You Have Come to Fear the Most. The song was written by lead singer Chris Carrabba. It was originally recorded for the band's 2000 debut album, The Swiss Army Romance.

A live version of the song appears on the band's 2002 MTV Unplugged 2.0 album. The song was also featured in the 2002 MTV movie, Wasted.

== Release and reception ==
"Screaming Infidelities" is considered the band's breakout single. The song peaked at number 22 on the Billboard Alternative Songs chart in May 2002.

A music video for the song was released in 2002 and was directed by Maureen Egan and Matthew Barry. The video won the MTV2 award at the 2002 MTV Video Music Awards, beating out Norah Jones, the Strokes, Musiq Soulchild, the Hives, and Nappy Roots. Carrabba said that winning the award ranked among his biggest accomplishments in a year marked by crowning achievements.

Alternative Press said of the song: "CC's manifestation of honest emotion remains far more sincere than the sub-par mewling of wafer-heads currently wasting oxygen in independently owned coffeehouses."

Variety ranked it as one of the best emo songs of all time in 2022.

== Chart performance ==
| Chart (2002) | Peak position |
|---|---|
| US Alternative Airplay (Billboard) | 22 |

== Cover versions ==
- Joanna Pacitti, prior to becoming a contestant on American Idol during season 8, released a cover version of the song as a single from her 2006 album This Crazy Life.
