= The Places You Have Come to Fear the Most =

Studio album by Dashboard Confessional
- Released: March 20, 2001
- Recorded: February 2001
- Genre: Emo
- Length: 29:47
- Label: Vagrant
- Producer: James Paul Wisner

Dashboard Confessional chronology
| The Swiss Army Romance (2000) | The Places You Have Come to Fear the Most (2001) | MTV Unplugged 2.0 (2002) |

Singles from The Places You Have Come to Fear the Most
- 1. "Screaming Infidelities" Released: January 15, 2002

The Places You Have Come to Fear the Most is the second studio album and major label debut by American rock band Dashboard Confessional, released on March 20, 2001, through Vagrant Records.

== Background and production ==
Dashboard Confessional started as an acoustic side project for vocalist/guitarist Chris Carrabba while he was fronting Further Seems Forever. The project's first album The Swiss Army Romance was released in early 2000 through local independent label Fiddler Records. Using his connections within the punk scene, Carrabba was able to perform on a few tours. Though the audience wasn't used to acoustic instrumentation, Carrabba won the crowds over. Eventually demand for the album was exceeding the label's supply, which resulted in owner Amy Fleisher licensing the record to Drive-Thru Records. In October, Carrabba announced his departure from Further Seems Forever.

The following month, Drive-Thru's version of the album was released. In the same month, Fleisher began working for independent label Vagrant Records. She pressed her boss Rich Egan to listen to The Swiss Army Romance, and when he did, exclaimed it was the "most refreshing indie rock I'd heard in forever". Carrabba thought Drive-Thru wouldn't be a good fit for the project, and told them that. The project signed to Vagrant instead, which caused Drive-Thru to threaten litigation. In response, Carrabba stated he wasn't signed to Drive-Thru, and simply had an oral agreement with them.

In November and December, Carrabba supported New Found Glory on their headlining tour. Soon afterwards, Drive-Thru ceased supplying the release to distributors, which in turn made it unavailable in brick and mortar stores. When Carrabba became aware of this, he decided to start working on a new album. He flew to Florida, met his brother at the airport with his guitar, and went to James Paul Wisner's apartment. With Carrabba spending the opening three weeks of 2001 crafting songs for the next album, the project evolved into a band consisting of: Carrabba, bassist Dan Bonebrake (Carrabba's bandmate in the Vacant Andy's), and drummer Mike Marsh, formerly of The Agency.

Between the end of January and early March, the group went on tour with Face to Face, H_{2}O, and Snapcase. In between dates on the tour, they recorded their second album. Recording occurred in February over two and a half weeks with producer James Paul Wisner. By this point, the group had only practiced together three times. "Screaming Infidelities" and "Again I Go Unnoticed" were re-recorded from their original appearance on the band's first album The Swiss Army Romance. Jolie Lindholm of The Rocking Horse Winner lent her vocals to some of the songs on the album.

== Release and promotion ==
The Places You Have Come to Fear the Most was released on March 20, 2001. In March and April, the group supported Hey Mercedes on their US headlining tour. In May, the band supported the Weakerthans on their headlining tour of the US. Another tour in June and early July followed, before joining the Vagrant America Tour, which continued into September. Partway through the trek, the band appeared at Krazy Fest 4 in Louisville, Kentucky. Following this, Carrabba attempted to make the band's touring line-up official members; however, touring guitarist Mike Stroud left, and was replaced by Sunny Day Real Estate guitarist Dan Hoerner, and Bonebrake declined the offer, focusing his efforts on Seville. Dashboard Confessional appeared on The Late Late Show with Craig Kilborn later in September. They closed the year with a six-week long headlining tour from late October to early December.

A music video was filmed for "Screaming Infidelities" in early January 2002 with directors Maureen Egan and Matthew Barry. The video went on to win the MTV 2 Award at the 2002 MTV Video Music Awards, beating out The Strokes, Norah Jones, The Hives, Nappy Roots featuring Jazzy Fey, and Musiq. The track was remixed by Andy Wallace and released as a single on January 15. The song's music video debuted later in the month and was in heavy rotation at MTV and MTV2. Following this, the album was given retail exposure with listening booths at various big chain stores. In addition, the release received heavy airplay support from 89X, KFSD and WVEP. In March and April, they went a tour of the US with support from the Anniversary, Ben Kweller and Seafood.

In May, Bonebrake left the band, and was replaced by Scott Schoenbeck of the Promise Ring, who was the brother of touring manager Mike Schoenbeck. By the following month, John Lefler joined the band as an additional guitarist. In the same month, the band appeared on Last Call with Carson Daly, and toured the north eastern US states with Seville. In July and August, the group supported Weezer on their headlining US arena tour. On July 22, the band appeared on the Late Show with David Letterman. A music video for "Saints and Sailors" premiered on MTV2 on August 22. The clip was one shot at the El Rey Theatre in Los Angeles, California. At the end of the month, the group appeared at the Reading and Leeds Festivals. "Saints and Sailors" was released to alternative radio on September 27. On October 15, the band appeared on Last Call with Carson Daly again. In October and November, the group went on a headlining US tour with support from Piebald and Rhett Miller. Piebald had to drop off the tour due to their frontman requiring vocal surgery.

== Style ==
The album has been described as "a little sappy."

== Reception and legacy ==
Professional ratings
Review scores
| Source | Rating |
|---|---|
| AllMusic | 4/5 stars |
| Blender | 3/5 stars |
| CMJ New Music Report | Favorable |
| LAS Magazine | Unfavorable |
| The Morning Call | Unfavorable |
| Ox-Fanzine | Favorable |
| Pitchfork | 4.2/10 |
| Q | 4/5 stars |
| Robert Christgau | (dud) |
| The Rolling Stone Album Guide | 4/5 stars |

The Places You Have Come to Fear the Most sold 2,500 copies in its first week, over 40,000 copies by August, and 65,000 by the end of the year. By mid-2002, it surpassed the 200,000 mark, and was close to the 400,000 mark by early 2003. As of August 2003, sales stood at 426,000 copies. The album has been certified Gold by the RIAA, meaning it sold over 500,000 copies in the United States.

The album, according to Rock Sound, gave Dashboard Confessional "a ton of worldwide exposure." This resulted in Carrabba becoming "the poster boy for the emo resurgence of the early 2000s" and the album "defin[ing] an entire movement." Rock Sound later ranked it at number 38 on the list of best albums in their lifetime. Journalists Leslie Simon and Trevor Kelley included the album in their list of the most essential emo releases in their book Everybody Hurts: An Essential Guide to Emo Culture (2007). Alternative Press ranked "Screaming Infidelities" at number seven on their list of the best 100 singles from the 2000s.

Andrew Sacher of BrooklynVegan observed the album's influence in the work of Julien Baker and Phoebe Bridgers, saying: "Places helped introduce emo to tons of people who had never heard of it, and you can still feel its lasting impact today."

== Track listing ==
All songs written and arranged by Chris Carrabba.

1. "The Brilliant Dance" – 3:03
2. "Screaming Infidelities" – 3:46
3. "The Best Deceptions" – 4:15
4. "This Ruined Puzzle" – 2:52
5. "Saints and Sailors" – 2:33
6. "The Good Fight" – 2:27
7. "Standard Lines" – 2:27
8. "Again I Go Unnoticed" – 2:17
9. "The Places You Have Come to Fear the Most" – 2:56
10. "This Bitter Pill" – 3:13

== Personnel ==
Personnel per booklet.

Dashboard Confessional

- Chris Carrabba – vocals, guitar
- Dan Bonebrake – bass, additional backing vocals
- Mike Marsh – drums, additional backing vocals

Additional musicians

- Jolie Lindholm – additional backing vocals

Production

- James Paul Wisner – producer
- Ryan Joseph Shaughnessy – photography
- Joby J. Ford – graphic design

== Chart performance ==
| Chart | Peak position |
|---|---|
| US Billboard 200 | 108 |
| US Independent Albums (Billboard) | 5 |

=== Year-end charts ===
| Chart (2002) | Position |
|---|---|
| Canadian Alternative Albums (Nielsen SoundScan) | 154 |
