= Glitterbomb =

Glitterbomb may refer to:

- Glitter bombing, an act of protest where glitter is thrown on public figures, especially those perceived to be against LGBTQ rights
- Glitterbomb, a schnapps-based cocktail; see List of cocktails
- "Glitterbomb", a 2001 song by The Bled from His First Crush
- "Glitterbomb", a 2017 song by Incubus from 8
- "Glitterbombed", a 2013 song by Charlotte Church from Two
- "Glitterbomb", a YouTube series by Mark Rober about pranking delivery thieves.

== See also ==
- Glitter
