= Belle of the Boulevard =

Single by Dashboard Confessional

from the album Alter the Ending
- Released: 13 October 2009 (Digital Download)
- Genre: Alternative rock
- Length: 3:27 (Radio Edit); 4:02 (Album Version); 4:11 (Acoustic Version)
- Label: Interscope
- Songwriter: Chris Carrabba
- Producer: Butch Walker

Dashboard Confessional singles chronology
"These Bones" (2008)	"Belle of the Boulevard" (2009)	"We Fight" (2017)

"Belle of the Boulevard" is the lead single by American alternative rock band Dashboard Confessional from their sixth studio album Alter the Ending. The song first appeared on Radio Sophie on September 17, 2009, and later the band posted it on their MySpace page on September 21, 2009. The song charted at number 36 on Billboard's Adult Pop Songs chart.

== Background ==
"Belle of the Boulevard" talks about a girl, whom the singer-composer considers as one of the most beautiful women he's known. “We lost touch and I was sad to see how far she’d fallen. I didn’t intend to write the song about her but I sat down in the piano and the chords sounded good and suddenly there was a song there.” “Funny thing is I saw her the other day and she doesn’t know I’ve written this song about her. I can’t tell her. She’s heard the song. I hope it did make her realize it was written for her but she didn’t ask me.” Chris shares, drawing sympathy from the audience, who flocked to the Glorieta Activity Center for the band's press conference.

== Music video ==
The band premiered the music video for "Belle Of The Boulevard" on Myspace Music on November 25, 2009. The video was shot in New Orleans and directed by actress Joey Lauren Adams.

== Track listing ==
Belle of the Boulevard (Digital Download)

#	Title	Length
1.	"Belle of the Boulevard"	4:02

Belle of the Boulevard (Promo CD)

#	Title	Length
1.	"Belle of the Boulevard (Radio Edit)"	3:27

Belle of the Boulevard (Germany 2-Track Single)

#	Title	Length
1.	"Belle of the Boulevard"	4:02
2.	"Belle of the Boulevard (Acoustic)"	4:11

== Charts ==
=== Weekly charts ===
Chart (2010)	Peak position
Italy Airplay (EarOne)	10
US Adult Top 40 (Billboard)	36

=== Year-end charts ===
Chart (2010)	Peak position
Italy Airplay (EarOne)	46
