= A Mark, a Mission, a Brand, a Scar =

Studio album by Dashboard Confessional
- Released: August 12, 2003
- Recorded: January 2003
- Studios: Bogart Recording Studios, Miami, Florida; Laundry Room Studios
- Genres: Emo, alternative rock
- Length: 50:54
- Label: Vagrant
- Producers: Gil Norton, Chris Carrabba

Dashboard Confessional chronology
MTV Unplugged 2.0 (2002)	A Mark, a Mission, a Brand, a Scar (2003)	Dusk and Summer (2006)

Singles from A Mark, a Mission, a Brand, a Scar
- 1. "Hands Down" Released: July 10, 2003; 2. "Rapid Hope Loss" Released: May 4, 2004; 3. "As Lovers Go" Released: 2004

A Mark, a Mission, a Brand, a Scar is the third studio album by American rock band Dashboard Confessional, released in 2003 through Vagrant Records.

== Background ==
Dashboard Confessional started as the one-man acoustic project of vocalist/guitarist Chris Carrabba. The project's second album The Places You Have Come to Fear the Most (2001), released through independent label Vagrant Records, featured a full band on a few of the songs. The album become Vagrant's best-selling release. Lead single "Screaming Infidelities" became a hit at modern rock radio stations. The So Impossible EP, made in collaboration with guitarist Dan Hoerner of Sunny Day Real Estate, was released in December.

It was followed by a companion piece, the Summers Kiss EP in April 2002. Later in 2002, Dashboard Confessional taped a performance for MTV's Unplugged series, which was later released as MTV Unplugged 2.0. As Dashboard Confessional was becoming a staple at radio and on MTV, the project solidified its line-up as a group: Carrabba, bassist Scott Schoenbeck, guitarist John Lefler and drummer Mike Marsh. In December, Carrabba revealed the next album's title: A Mark, a Mission, a Brand, a Scar.

== Production ==
Carrabba lived in a condo with his brother and made over 40 demos using his Korg digital 8-track recorder. Musically, the demos ranged from alternative country to pop in the vein of The Beach Boys. Recording for A Mark, a Mission, a Brand, a Scar took place at Bogart Recording Studios in North Miami, Florida in January 2003. Gil Norton produced the majority of the songs, except "Ghost of a Good Thing" and "If You Can't Leave It Be, Might as Well Make It Bleed", which were credited to Carrabba. Carrabba said Norton "really understood the basic importance" of the tracks and recognised how to improve them without needing to alter them.

Carrabba said the final recordings sounded exactly like the demos he made, both note-for-note and structurally, with the exception of "Ghost of a Good Thing". Norton convinced Carrabba not to re-record the track, resulting in the demo version appearing on the album. Additional tracking took place at Laundry Room Studios. Norton and Adrian Bushby, who also served as engineer, mixed the album at Strongroom Studios in London, UK. Bob Ludwig mastered the recordings at Gateway Mastering.

== Music and lyrics ==
Musically, A Mark, a Mission, a Brand, a Scar had been described as alternative rock, emo and pop rock, touching on elements of soft rock and hardcore punk, drawing comparison to Manic Street Preachers and Sunny Day Real Estate. Alternative Press considers it a "scene album", saying it "mixed the core of emo music with an upbeat flare."

The album saw Carrabba leave the solo acoustic sound of his earlier work for full-band instrumentation, though a few tracks were acoustically driven. The verses sections are sung with a whisper, while the choruses are yelled, with the bridges being a mix of the two techniques; Carrabba's vocal was compared to Third Eye Blind frontman Stephan Jenkins. He came up with the album title while pondering on the meaning of Dashboard Confessional's name.

Themes explored on the album include love, romance and desire. Carrabba successfully mixed the core of emo music with an upbeat flare Early acoustic versions of "Hands Down" appeared on the So Impossible EP and the MTV Unplugged 2.0 (2002) live album. The song, which was reminiscent of Jimmy Eat World, talks about being in love on the happiest day of your life. "Rapid Hope Loss" was written early in the writing process, and credited to Carrabba and Mike Stroud. The track is about not giving a second chance to an ex-lover. "Carry This Picture" was written in the Soho Grand Hotel in New York City. It talks about finding love at a resort town in Florida. "Ghost of a Good Thing" discusses a languishing relationship. "So Beautiful" talks about heavy drinking. Carrabba considered The closing track "Several Ways to Die Trying" serves as a critique of Hollywood. "This Old Wound" the darkest song he's ever written, and said it was "as literal as can be. I was having a day where I was like, 'How am I ever gonna get over this stuff?'"

== Release ==
On March 25, 2003, A Mark, a Mission, a Brand, a Scar was announced for release. In May, Carrabba went on a solo tour, before joining with his band for a support slot for Beck on his US tour, with dates running into June. However, they left abruptly mid-June citing "circumstances beyond our control". Following this, Carrabba played a few solo shows. "Hands Down" was released as a single on July 10, before being released to modern rock radio five days later. A music video was filmed for the track shortly afterwards in New York City with director Nzingha Stewart. In early August, the band appeared on the Late Show with David Letterman and Last Call with Carson Daly. A Mark, a Mission, a Brand, a Scar was initially planned for release in July, before eventually being released on August 19 through Vagrant Records. Major label Interscope Records owned a 49% percent non-controlling interest in Vagrant. Label founder Rich Egan said this was to boost their marketing, and to provide his acts "the best of what a major label can offer with none of the crap." Carrabba said, who had a lot of control with his marketing, renewed his contract with Vagrant after he realised the deal with Interscope allowed him the same amount of control. The UK edition of the album featured "This Old Wound" and "The End of an Anchor" as bonus tracks.

Between late August and early October, the group went on a headlining US tour with support from MxPx and Brand New. Remedy Session and Vendetta Red appeared on select dates. Later in October 2003, the band appeared on Late Night with Conan O'Brien and The Tonight Show with Jay Leno. "Rapid Hope Loss" was released to radio on December 9. A music video was filmed for the track in January 2004 with director Brian Scott Weber. Throughout the clip, the camera zooms out to show images within images. The group picked Weber's treatment after sorting through 20 other potential ideas. In May and June 2004, the group headlined the Honda Civic Tour, with main support from Thrice and The Get Up Kids. Additional support on select dates came from Say Anything, Motion City Soundtrack, The Format, Hot Water Music and Head Automatica. On May 18, Vagrant Records released a deluxe edition, which included a DVD of the MTV2 Album Covers performance, where the band performed songs from R.E.M.'s Automatic for the People (1992). Between July and September, the group played festival shows in Australia, the UK and the US, which included an appearance at the Austin City Limits Music Festival.

== Reception ==
Professional ratings
Aggregate scores
Source	Rating
Metacritic	77/100
Review scores
Source	Rating
AllMusic	4/5 stars
Blender	3/5 stars
Chicago Sun-Times	3/4 stars
Entertainment Weekly	B+
The Guardian	3/5 stars
Houston Chronicle	4/5 stars
Q	4/5 stars
Rolling Stone	4/5 stars
Slant Magazine	3/5 stars
Spin	B+

A Mark, a Mission, a Brand, a Scar debuted at number 2 on the Billboard 200 chart, selling 122,000 copies in its first week. It has been certified gold by RIAA, meaning it has shipped over 500,000 copies in the United States. Similarly, "Hands Down" appeared on a best-of emo songs list by Vulture. Alternative Press ranked "Hands Down" at number 51 on their list of the best 100 singles from the 2000s.

== Track listing ==
All songs written by Chris Carrabba, except "Morning Calls" by Carrabba and Mike Stroud.

1. "Hands Down" – 3:06
2. "Rapid Hope Loss" – 3:41
3. "As Lovers Go" – 3:30
4. "Carry This Picture" – 2:53
5. "Bend and Not Break" – 5:06
6. "Ghost of a Good Thing" – 3:45
7. "Am I Missing" – 4:03
8. "Morning Calls" – 4:20
9. "Carve Your Heart Out Yourself" – 3:44
10. "So Beautiful" – 3:27
11. "Hey Girl" – 3:34
12. "If You Can't Leave It Be, Might as Well Make It Bleed" – 3:38
13. "Several Ways to Die Trying" – 6:07

UK bonus tracks

14. "This Old Wound" – 4:02
15. "The End of an Anchor" – 5:26

== Personnel ==
Personnel per booklet.

Dashboard Confessional

- Chris Carrabba – lead vocals, rhythm guitar
- Scott Schoenbeck – bass
- John Lefler – lead guitar, organs, piano, backing vocals
- Mike Marsh – drums, percussion, backing vocals

Production

- Gil Norton – producer (except tracks 6 and 12), mixing
- Chris Carrabba – producer (tracks 6 and 12)
- Adrian Bushby – mixing, engineer
- Bob Ludwig – mastering
- R.J. Shaughnessy – photography
- Sean Tejaratchi – design

== Charts ==
=== Weekly charts ===
Chart (2003)	Peak position
UK Albums (Official Charts)	93
US Billboard 200	2
US Independent Albums (Billboard)	1

=== Year-end charts ===
Chart (2003)	Position
US Billboard 200	183

== Certifications ==
Region	Certification	Certified units/sales
United States (RIAA)	Gold	500,000^{^}
^{^} Shipments figures based on certification alone.
