= This Crazy Life =

Studio album by Joanna Pacitti
- Released: August 15, 2006
- Genre: Pop rock, soul
- Label: Geffen
- Producer: Ron Fair

Singles from This Crazy Life
- 1. "Let It Slide" Released: 2006; 2. "Screaming Infidelities" Released: 2006

This Crazy Life is the debut studio album by American singer Joanna Pacitti, more commonly known as Joanna. The singles from this album are "Let It Slide" and "Screaming Infidelities". One of Pacitti's songs, "Ultraviolet" was featured on the Girl Next compilation album. It was also covered by the Stiff Dylans for the movie soundtrack of Angus, Thongs and Perfect Snogging. One of the songs from the album "Just When You're Leaving" was included on the album "Chelsea Mix" which was released to promote the My Scene dolls.

== Track listing ==
1. "Let It Slide" (Alain Bertoni; Christian Hamm; Laura Zonka) – 4:14
2. "Ultraviolet" (Anne Preven; Scott Cutler) – 3:46
3. "Broken" (Anthony Mazza; Joanna Pacitti; Stefanie Ridel) – 3:16
4. "Screaming Infidelities" (Chris Carrabba) – 4:06
5. "4th of July" (Joanna Pacitti; Renee Sandstrom; Fergie; Stefanie Ridel; Stephan Moccio) – 4:33
6. "Tip Toe" (Dave Bassett; Joanna Pacitti) – 4:09
7. "Drifter" (Anthony Mazza; Joanna Pacitti; Stefanie Ridel) – 3:26
8. "This Crazy Life" (Eric Rosse; Joanna Pacitti; Nathan Crow) – 3:56
9. "Just When You're Leaving" (Jimmy Harry; Joanna Pacitti) – 3:26
10. "Let Go" (Anthony Mazza; Joanna Pacitti; Ron Harris; Stephanie Ridel) – 3:49
11. "Your Obsession" (Diane Warren) – 3:49
12. "Miracle" (Linda Perry) – 3:57
13. "Don't Trip on Your Way Out"(iTunes Bonus Track) (Evan Brubaker; Mathew Wilder; Sean Siner; Skip Peri) – 3:31

== Singles ==
- Let It Slide - May 9, 2006
- Screaming Infidelities
