= The Swiss Army Romance =

Studio album by Dashboard Confessional
- Released: March 2000
- Recorded: 2000
- Genre: Acoustic rock; indie rock; emo
- Length: 33:12
- Label: Fiddler
- Producer: James Paul Wisner

Dashboard Confessional chronology
The Swiss Army Romance (2000)	The Places You Have Come to Fear the Most (2001)

The Swiss Army Romance is the debut studio album by American band Dashboard Confessional, released in March 2000 by Fiddler Records.

== Release ==
It was released through Fiddler Records in March 2000, limited to 1,000 copies. A decision was made shortly afterwards to sell the album to Drive-Thru Records. Drive-Thru re-released the album on November 14, 2000. In 2003, the rights to the record were sold to Chris Carrabba and Vagrant Records and the album was re-issued on April 22, 2003. The re-release included bonus tracks "Hold On" and "This Is a Forgery". The re-release was spurred by the rising popularity of the band and the announcement of the then upcoming album A Mark, a Mission, a Brand, a Scar.

== Reception and legacy ==
Professional ratings
Review scores
Source	Rating
AllMusic	3/5 stars
Blender	2/5 stars
The Rolling Stone Album Guide	4/5 stars

The album was included in Rock Sound's 101 Modern Classics list at number 100. It has appeared on a best-of emo album list by Loudwire. In 2025, Stephen Andrew Galiher of Vice included the album in his list of "4 Underrated Emo Albums From the 2000s That Deserve More Love Today".

== Track listing ==
All songs written by Chris Carrabba.

1. "Screaming Infidelities" – 3:33
2. "The Sharp Hint of New Tears" – 3:02
3. "Living in Your Letters" – 3:40
4. "The Swiss Army Romance" – 3:06
5. "Turpentine Chaser" – 3:20
6. "A Plain Morning" – 3:40
7. "Age Six Racer" – 2:21
8. "Again I Go Unnoticed" – 2:24
9. "Ender Will Save Us All" – 5:13
10. "Shirts and Gloves" – 2:56

Bonus tracks

11. "Hold On" (re-issue bonus track) – 2:08
12. "This Is a Forgery" (re-issue bonus track) – 3:36
13. "Not So Easy" (hidden track) – 4:02

== Personnel ==
Personnel per booklet.

Dashboard Confessional

- Chris Carrabba – vocals, guitar

Additional musicians

- John Ralston – additional guitar, backing vocals
- Jolie Lindholm – additional backing vocals
- James Paul Wisner – keys

Production

- James Paul Wisner – producer
- R.J. Shaughnessy – photography
- Keath Moon – graphic design

== Chart positions ==
=== Album ===
Year	Chart	Peak position
2003	Top Heatseekers	39

=== Singles ===
Single	Chart	Peak position
"Screaming Infidelities	Modern Rock Tracks	22
