= The Shade of Poison Trees =

Studio album by Dashboard Confessional
- Released: October 2, 2007
- Recorded: March 2007
- Studio: Bieler Brothers Studio; The Dungeon
- Genre: Emo
- Length: 33:44
- Label: Vagrant
- Producer: Don Gilmore

Dashboard Confessional chronology
Dusk and Summer (2006)	The Shade of Poison Trees (2007)	Alter the Ending (2009)

Singles from The Shade of Poison Trees
- 1. "Thick as Thieves" Released: October 2, 2007; 2. "These Bones" Released: 2008

The Shade of Poison Trees is the fifth studio album recorded by the band Dashboard Confessional.

== Production and composition ==
The Shade of Poison Trees had been recorded over 10 days in Florida with producer Don Gilmore and engineer Mark Kiczula. Recording took place at Bieler Brothers Studio with assistant engineer Matt LaPlant, and at The Dungeon with assistant engineer Joe Williams. Gilmore mixed the recordings with help from Kiczula, at Bieler Brothers Studio. George Marino mastered the recordings at Sterling Sound.

The Shade of Poison Trees is heralded as a return to form, so to speak, breaking away from the electric, full band sound of their previous two albums and returning to the acoustic sound that Carrabba was previously known for. However, the album is unmistakably more mature, as the songs sound similar to their more recent work, yet without the heavily produced style.

== Release ==
On August 16, 2007, The Shade of Poison Trees was announced for release, and "Thick as Thieves" was made available for streaming via the group's Myspace account. Demos of the iTunes bonus track "Tonight I'll Take What I Can Get" were previously posted online in 2002; the UK bonus track "The Only Gift That I Need" previously appeared on a KROQ compilation album. On August 22, the band posted "Little Bombs" on their Myspace page. On September 7, Chris Carrabba posted a video message on his Myspace blog, inviting his fans to create a music video for the song "Thick as Thieves". The winning director wins a prize of $2,500 cash, two VIP tickets, and a "Golden Ticket" to any and all Dashboard Confessional concerts in the next year. From mid-September to mid-November, Carrabba went on a solo US tour with support from Augustana and John Ralston. On September 26, "Keep Watch for the Mines" was posted to their Myspace.

The album in its entirety was posted on the band's Myspace page on September 28, 2007, and it was released on October 2 on Vagrant Records. "Thick as Thieves" was released to radio on October 2. In November and December, the band went a brief arena tour in the UK with Maroon 5. "These Bones" was Dashboard Confessional's second single off the album and was released December 3, 2007. In late January 2008, the band went on a brief tour of the UK. In April, the band went on another tour of the UK. "Thick as Thieves" was released as a single on April 14. In October and November, the band co-headlined the Rock Band Live tour with Panic! at the Disco. They were supported by Plain White T's and the Cab.

== Reception ==
Professional ratings
Aggregate scores
Source	Rating
Metacritic	68/100
Review scores
Source	Rating
AllMusic	3.5/5 stars
The A.V. Club	B+
Entertainment Weekly	C+
PopMatters	7/10 stars
Rolling Stone	3/5 stars
Spin	7/10
Sputnikmusic	3/5
Stylus Magazine	B
Uncut	3/5 stars

Following its release, The Shade of Poison Trees debuted at number 18 on the U.S. Billboard 200 chart, selling about 48,000 copies in its first week.

== Track listing ==
All songs written by Chris Carrabba.

1. "Where There's Gold..." – 2:29
2. "Thick as Thieves" – 2:19
3. "Keep Watch for the Mines" – 2:46
4. "These Bones" – 2:59
5. "Fever Dreams" – 2:30
6. "The Shade of Poison Trees" – 2:58
7. "The Rush" – 3:51
8. "Little Bombs" – 2:33
9. "I Light My Own Fires Now" – 2:54
10. "Matters of Blood and Connection" – 2:24
11. "Clean Breaks" – 2:59
12. "The Widows Peak" – 2:58

=== Bonus tracks ===
1. "The Only Gift That I Need" – 2:07*
2. "Tonight I'll Take What I Can Get" [re-recorded] (iTunes pre-order bonus track) – 4:11
3. "Tonight I'll Take What I Can Get" (original acoustic version) – 4:14*

"*"UK bonus tracks

== Personnel ==
Personnel per booklet.

Dashboard Confessional

- Chris Carrabba – lead vocals, guitar
- Scott Schoenbeck – bass
- John Lefler – lead guitar
- Mike Marsh – drums

Production

- Don Gilmore – producer, mixing
- Mark Kiczula – engineer, mixing Pro Tools engineer
- Matt LaPlant – assistant engineer
- Joe Williams – assistant engineer
- George Marino – mastering
- Ben Goetting – art, design

== Charts ==
Chart	Peak position
UK Independent Albums (OCC)	14
US Billboard 200	18
US Top Alternative Albums (Billboard)	4
US Independent Albums (Billboard)	1
US Top Rock Albums (Billboard)	6
