= Loaded (American TV series) =

Television series by Fuse TV

Loaded is a half-hour-long series on the public TV station Fuse TV. During the show, videos from one specific artist play. Usually there is a mix of old and new videos for each artist. Depending on the video length there are between 5 and 6 videos per episode.

== List of artists featured ==
- 2 Chainz
- 311
- 50 Cent
- The Academy Is...
- Aerosmith
- AFI
- Against Me!
- Akon
- Alanis Morissette
- Alicia Keys
- All-American Rejects
- Angels & Airwaves
- Ariana Grande
- ASAP Mob
- Audioslave
- Avenged Sevenfold
- Avril Lavigne
- Beastie Boys
- Beck
- Beyoncé
- The Black Eyed Peas
- Blink-182
- Blur
- Bright Eyes
- Britney Spears
- Bruno Mars
- Bush
- Chevelle
- Christina Aguilera
- Chris Brown
- Ciara
- Coheed and Cambria
- Dashboard Confessional
- Daughtry
- Demi Lovato
- Depeche Mode
- Drake
- Eminem
- Evanescence
- Fall Out Boy
- Fat Joe
- Fergie
- Fifth Harmony
- Flo Rida
- Foo Fighters
- Future

+French Montana

- Good Charlotte
- Gorillaz
- Green Day
- Guns N' Roses
- Gwen Stefani
- Iggy Azalea
- Ja Rule
- Janet Jackson
- Jason Derulo
- Jay-Z
- Jennifer Hudson
- Jennifer Lopez
- Justin Bieber
- Justin Timberlake
- Kanye West
- Katy Perry
- Kelly Clarkson
- Kendrick Lamar
- Kid Rock
- The Killers
- Kings Of Leon
- Korn
- Lady Gaga
- Lil' Kim
- Lil Wayne
- Limp Bizkit
- Linkin Park
- Macklemore
- Madonna
- Mariah Carey
- Maroon 5
- Metallica
- Michael Jackson
- Miley Cyrus
- Missy Elliott
- Muse
- My Chemical Romance
- Mýa
- Nelly
- Nelly Furtado
- New Found Glory
- Nickelback
- Nicki Minaj
- Nine Inch Nails
- Nirvana
- No Doubt
- The Notorious B.I.G.
- Oasis
- The Offspring
- One Direction
- Outkast
- Panic! at the Disco
- Paramore
- Pearl Jam
- Pharrell Williams
- Pink
- Prince
- Pussycat Dolls
- R. Kelly
- Radiohead
- Red Hot Chili Peppers
- Rick Ross
- Rihanna
- Rise Against
- Run-D.M.C.
- Sam Smith
- Sean Combs
- Seether
- Slipknot
- Soundgarden
- Stone Temple Pilots
- Sum 41
- System of a Down
- T.I.
- Taking Back Sunday
- Taylor Swift
- Three Days Grace
- Tupac Shakur
- U2
- The Used
- Usher
- Van Halen
- Weezer
- Whitney Houston
- Wiz Khalifa
- Wyclef Jean
- Xzibit
- Young Thug

== Format ==
The show airs at 6:00 P.M. ET on all weekdays, 2:00 P.M. ET and 6:00 P.M. ET on Monday, 2:00 A.M. ET, 2:30 A.M. ET, 2:00 P.M. ET and 6:00 P.M. ET on Tuesday, and adds an episode for every weekday except Thursday, on which there are 6, Saturday night when there is 1 episode. The same weekday schedule is employed on Saturday and Sunday. An average episode would have 5-6 music videos from the same artist, depending on the length of each video. Recently, the network added a program where various artists' music videos are shown, this episode is called "Voodoo".

== See also ==
- The Sauce
- Fuse TV
- Voodoo
