= Susan Sherouse =

- Born: 1983 (age 42–43)
- Genres: Acoustic rock; indie rock
- Instrument: Violin
- Years active: 2005–present
- Formerly of: Dashboard Confessional

Susan Sherouse is an American violinist from Lakeland, Florida. She attended the Lois Cowles Harrison Center for the Visual and Performing Arts, from which she graduated in 2001. She continued her education at Palm Beach Atlantic University. She most commonly tours and records with John Ralston and Dashboard Confessional, and has accompanied the latter in performances on The Tonight Show and Late Show with David Letterman.

She is also a member of the Lake Worth collective group called Invisible Music.

== Personal life ==
Susan has worked with the Jupiter-based non-profit organization Hope From Harrison to raise awareness for sick children and their parents.

== Discography ==
- Needle Bed – John Ralston (June 6, 2006)
- Dusk and Summer – Dashboard Confessional (June 27, 2006)
