= Heat Fetish =

Album by The Bled

Studio album by The Bled
- Released: March 9, 2010
- Recorded: 2009
- Genre: Post-hardcore
- Length: 39:17
- Label: Rise
- Producer: Nando Rivas, Jeremy Ray Talley

The Bled chronology
Silent Treatment (2007)	Heat Fetish (2010)

Professional ratings
Review scores
Source	Rating
AllMusic	3.5/5 stars
Lost In The Sound	(84%)

Heat Fetish is the fourth studio album by American hardcore band The Bled. The album was released on March 9, 2010.

== Background ==
Following the tours in support of The Bled's 2007 studio album, Silent Treatment, the band announced that they would take a break from touring. Several members found themselves in debt after this choice, which forced members to take day jobs or temporarily join other bands. Ultimately, founding members Ross Ott and Mike Pedicone, in addition to bassist Darren Simoes who joined the band in 2004, chose to leave The Bled leaving only vocalist James Muñoz and guitarist Jeremy Talley. Muñoz and Talley wanted to "rock by any means necessary," and continue releasing music as The Bled. The former members were replaced by guitarist Robbie Burbidge, bassist Brad Murray and drummer Josh Skibar.

Prior to joining the band, Burbidge, Murray and Skibar were fans of The Bled. The new members brought an outside perspective of what fans like about the band to the writing process.

== Track listing ==
No.	Title	Length
1.	"Devolver"	3:20
2.	"Mouthbreather"	1:34
3.	"Running Through Walls"	2:52
4.	"Smoke Breaks"	2:39
5.	"Need New Conspirators"	4:15
6.	"Shouting Fire in a Crowded Room"	2:41
7.	"Needs"	2:48
8.	"Meet Me in the Bone Orchard"	4:11
9.	"Crowbait"	3:34
10.	"When Exiting Your Vehicle"	3:24
11.	"Night Errors"	2:34
12.	"Crawling Home"	5:25
Total length:		39:17

== Personnel ==
The Bled

- James Muñoz – vocals
- Robbie Burbidge – guitar
- Brad Murray – bass guitar
- Josh Skibar – drums
- Jeremy Ray Talley – guitar

Production

- Fernando "Nando" Rivas – engineer, mixer, mastering
- Stephen Looker – management
