= Silent Treatment (The Bled album) =

Studio album by the Bled
- Released: September 25, 2007
- Recorded: March–April 2007
- Genre: Hardcore punk; emo; metalcore
- Length: 35:43
- Label: Vagrant
- Producer: Brian McTernan

The Bled chronology
Found in the Flood (2005)	Silent Treatment (2007)	Heat Fetish (2010)

Professional ratings
Review scores
Source	Rating
AllMusic	3.5/5 stars
AP	3.5/5 stars
Kerrang!	4/5 stars
Outburn	7/10
Punktastic	3.5/5 stars
Rock Sound	9/10 stars
Metal Hammer	9/10 stars

Silent Treatment is the third studio album from Arizona hardcore band the Bled.

== Pre-order ==
People who pre-ordered the album through interpunk.com received a limited edition, green vinyl print of the album along with the cd, limited to 300. This was changed to a 2 LP press a day before the official release of the album, causing a week delay in shipping. Pre-orders were shipped out on Friday, October 4, 2007. The vinyl is translucent green.

== Track listing ==
No.	Title	Length
1.	"Shadetree Mechanics"	3:15
2.	"You Should Be Ashamed of Myself"	2:32
3.	"Threes Away"	4:06
4.	"Asleep On The Frontlines"	5:33
5.	"Platonic Sleepover Massacre"	1:01
6.	"Starving Artiste"	2:34
7.	"The Silver Lining"	2:16
8.	"Some Just Vanish"	2:54
9.	"Breathing Room Barricades"	4:58
10.	"Beheaded My Way"	3:11
11.	"My Bitter Half"	3:23
Total length:		35:43

Bonus tracks

1. "Catholic Schoolgirl Blues"

Remixes

1. "Asleep on the Frontlines (Appliantz Remix)" – 5:33 On the Resident Evil: Extinction Soundtrack

== Appearances ==
The track "Starving Artiste" was featured on the Tony Hawk's Proving Ground soundtrack.

"You Should Be Ashamed of Myself" was featured as a downloadable song in the Xbox 360 version of Guitar Hero II.

== Credits ==
- James Munoz – vocals
- Ross Ott – guitar
- Michael Pedicone – drums
- Darren Simoes – bass
- Jeremy Talley – guitar
- Morning Breath Inc. – art direction, design
- 2 FAKE – 3D rendering
- Chris Phelps – photography
- Stephen Looker – management
