= Found in the Flood =

Studio album by The Bled
- Released: August 23, 2005
- Recorded: March–April 2005
- Genre: Hardcore punk; mathcore; metalcore; post-hardcore
- Length: 70:49
- Label: Vagrant
- Producer: Mark Trombino

The Bled chronology
Pass the Flask (2003)	Found in the Flood (2005)	Silent Treatment (2007)

Professional ratings
Review scores
Source	Rating
AllMusic	3/5 stars
Punk News	3/5 stars

Found in the Flood is the second studio album by American post-hardcore band The Bled. The album was released on August 23, 2005.

== Reissue ==
The Bled originally released their first album on Fiddler Records, an independent, now defunct record label. Pass the Flask sold approx 50,000 copies while on Fiddler. The Bled then signed to Vagrant Records to release their second album, Found in the Flood.

== Track listing ==
No.	Title	Length
1.	"Hotel Coral Essex"	4:10
2.	"Guttershark"	3:29
3.	"My Assassin"	4:11
4.	"Antarctica"	5:55
5.	"She Calls Home"	2:35
6.	"The Last American Cowboy"	3:49
7.	"Daylight Bombings"	4:47
8.	"Millionaires"	1:27
9.	"With an Urgency"	2:40
10.	"I Don't Keep with Liars Anymore"	37:46
Total length:		70:49

== Personnel ==
The Bled

- Darren Simoes – bass
- Jeremy Talley – guitar
- James Muñoz – vocals
- Ross Ott – guitar
- Mike Pedicone – drums

Production

- Mark Trombino – engineering, production, mixing
- Maggie Taylor – album art
- Stephen Looker – management
