= The Bled =

American post-hardcore band

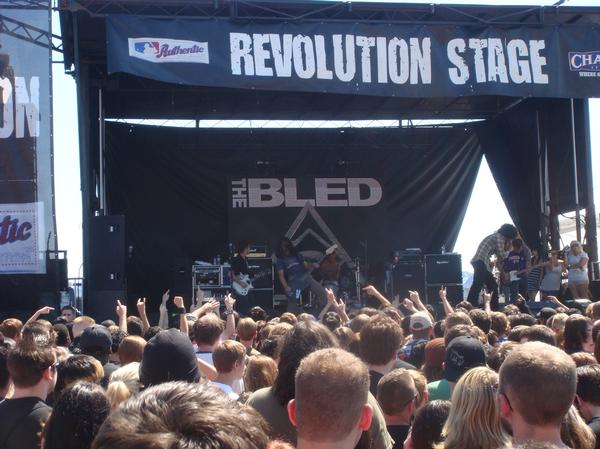
- The Bled performing in 2007

Background information
- Origin: Tucson, Arizona, U.S.
- Genres: Metalcore, post-hardcore, mathcore
- Years active: 2001–2012, 2021–present
- Labels: Rise, Vagrant, Fiddler, Sunset Alliance
- Members: James Muñoz; Jeremy Ray Talley; Ross Ott; Darren Simoes; Mike Pedicone
- Past members: Mike Celi; Adam Goss; Brad Murray; Shane Sheffer; Robbie Burbidge; Josh Skibar; Mike Parton

The Bled is an American metalcore band from Tucson, Arizona, formed in 2001. They released four studio albums (Pass the Flask, Found in the Flood, Silent Treatment and Heat Fetish) before disbanding in 2012.

== History ==
=== Formation and early years (2001–2002) ===
The Bled formed in 2001 under the name "The Radiation Defiance Theory" but changed the name because they felt it was too lengthy. Their music style was largely influenced by hardcore punk bands such as Refused, metalcore bands such as Cave In, and the mathcore band The Dillinger Escape Plan. After being a band for only two months, the band released an EP titled His First Crush with Ride the Rocket Records and Sunset Alliance, and released a self-titled EP a year later, both of which featured Adam Goss on vocals. The Bled quickly began to build a name for themselves in Tucson, Arizona, and started to play sold out shows.

=== Pass the Flask (2003–2004) ===
After achieving local success, The Bled caught the attention of Fiddler Records and later got signed. A day before the band started to record their debut album Pass the Flask, vocalist Adam Goss quit the band and suggested James Muñoz as a replacement. The rest of the band felt that Muñoz was a much better fit than Goss, and he became a permanent member of the band. Pass the Flask was released in July 2003 and the band toured doghounds relentlessly in support of it. This also marked the first time The Bled left Arizona to tour as a band. The album demonstrated The Bled's skills in both a lyrical sense and music sense as the band incorporated a wide variety of genres including metalcore, mathcore, melodic hardcore, and post-hardcore. The album was also a major success within the hardcore community.

=== Found in the Flood (2005–2007) ===
The Bled was not content with Fiddler Records, and decided to change labels. The band was a big fan of Vagrant Records, and in 2005 they signed to the indie record label, ensuring that a major label was not for them. Before working on their new album, the band parted ways with bass player Mike Celi and hired Darren Simoes as a permanent replacement. For their second studio album, Found in the Flood, The Bled worked with producer Mark Trombino (Jimmy Eat World, Blink-182). The album expanded both the heavier and lighter sides of the band. This album is also their first album to chart on the Billboard 200, which peaked at No. 87.

The success of the album landed The Bled a spot on Warped Tour in the summer of 2006 on the Vagrant Stage featuring many rising names signed to Vagrant Records, and the international Taste of Chaos in early 2007 alongside bands like Rise Against, The Used, and Aiden.

During this time Pass the Flask went out of print. The Bled was unable to sell it on tour because it was released on their previous label (that has since gone out of business). Many fans believed that Found in the Flood was the band's first and only album. To fix this, a reissue of Pass the Flask was created. The new version was released on Vagrant, and in addition to the original track listing the new album featured songs from The Bled's original EPs and three unreleased songs.

=== Silent Treatment (2007–2008) ===
After touring on the Taste of Chaos tour, the band started working on their new album. The process of writing and recording was slightly different from previous efforts. For the first two albums, Muñoz and Talley each wrote half an album worth of songs individually. For Silent Treatment Muñoz and Talley wrote songs together. The band also had five months to write songs for the album, the longest writing period to date for any album. While recording, The Bled set up a live webcam in the studio so fans could watch the progress. Silent Treatment was produced by Brian McTernan (Thrice, Converge) and featured a more evolved and heavy sound than what is found on Pass the Flask in addition to the slower melodic songs found on Found in the Flood.

Shortly before the release of Silent Treatment, The Bled toured in the 2007 Projekt Revolution Tour alongside Linkin Park, My Chemical Romance, Taking Back Sunday and others. After the album was released they toured the Take Action Tour with Every Time I Die and From First to Last followed by a short tour supporting The Dillinger Escape Plan. On April 18, while playing with the Dillinger Escape Plan at Ridglea Theater in Fort Worth, TX, vocalist James Muñoz told the crowd "this is our last tour for a long while" due to mutual exhaustion among the band members from extensive touring over the past year and financial turmoil within the band. During the hiatus, bassist Darren Simoes toured with New York hardcore act Warship alongside Reggie and the Full Effect, and guitarist Jeremy Ray formed the band Starving Arms with past members of the bands The Funeral March and Versus the Mirror.

=== Lineup changes, Heat Fetish, and break up ===
After touring in support of Silent Treatment, The Bled found themselves in debt. Each band member found a way outside of The Bled to earn money, such as getting regular jobs or playing in other bands. The end result was that three core members decided to no longer be a part of the band. Mike Pedicone joined Gavin Rossdale as drummer, Ross Ott started working for a company called ArtistForce, and Darren Simoes decided to finish college. These members were replaced by Robbie Burbidge, Brad Murray, Josh Skibar. The band recorded their follow-up to Silent Treatment after their spring tour with The Used, and proceeded to tour in support of the new album this summer. On March 30, it was reported by Alternative Press Magazine that The Bled had been dropped from their label, Vagrant Records. On March 31, The Bled put up two demo tracks on their MySpace titled "Mouthbreather" and "When Exiting Your Vehicle." It was confirmed that the two demos would be on the new record. On September 4, The Bled embarked on their first nationwide tour in over a year.

On August 13, 2009, it was announced that The Bled signed a two-record contract with Rise Records and would release their next full-length in February 2010 On November 13, 2009, Talley told Noisecreep that the forthcoming album would be called Heat Fetish

On May 8, 2010, it was announced that Shane Sheffer, vocalist of The Fade and formerly of The Funeral March and Starving Arms, would be replacing bassist Brad Murray on the Rise Records Tour and that Murray is no longer a part of The Bled. After the Rise Records tour, Mike Patton, a close friend to the band, their touring sound engineer and of no relation to Mike Patton of Faith No More, was picked to fill in on bass until further notice.

The Bled announced their breakup in August 2011 stating that it was, "time to move on to new things." A tour took place in November 2011, with the final four shows taking place in the United Kingdom. The band played their final show on February 19, 2012.

Guitarist Jeremy Talley announced via the band's Facebook that he will be forming a new project based around material intended for The Bled's final release. Talley also said information regarding this project will be released following The Bled's farewell tour.

Vocalist James Munoz has moved on to writing and acting in the weekly FunnyOrDie comedy sketch show, Apartment Sketch Show, as well as playing bass for the Richmond, Virginia punk rock band, Smoke or Fire. He has since left Smoke or Fire and joined another Richmond group, Xed Out.

=== Reunions and Pass the Flask 20th Anniversary ===
In 2021 the band reunited and played a reunion set at Furnace Fest.

In 2023, the band announced they would be performing limited shows as part of the 20th anniversary of their debut album, Pass The Flask. They played two back-to-back shows in September in Pomona, California (with Holy Fawn and Negative Blast), and one in New York City on November 11, 2023.

In February 2024, it was announced the band would be playing three shows in Texas as part of the Pass the Flask anniversary. The shows are on April 5, 6, and 7 in Dallas, Austin, and Houston, respectively. Support acts include American Fangs, Negative Blast, Cleric, and Bulletsbetweentongues.

In March 2024, the band announced they would be performing at the 2024 edition of Furnace Fest from October 4-6, 2024.

== Band members ==
Current members

- James Muñoz – vocals (2003–2012, 2021–present)
- Jeremy Ray Talley – guitar (2001–2012, 2021–present)
- Ross Ott – guitar (2001–2008, 2021–present)
- Darren Simoes – bass (2004–2008, 2021–present)
- Mike Pedicone – drums (2001–2008, 2021–present)

Former members

- Mike Celi – bass guitar (2001–2004)
- Adam Goss – vocals (2001–2003)
- Brad Murray – bass guitar (2009–2010)
- Shane Sheffer – bass guitar (2010–2011)
- Robbie Burbidge – guitar (2009–2012)
- Josh Skibar – drums (2009–2012)
- Mike Patton – bass guitar (2011–2012)

Timeline

== Discography ==
Studio albums

- Pass the Flask (2003)
- Found in the Flood (2005)
- Silent Treatment (2007)
- Heat Fetish (2010)

EPs

- His First Crush (2001)
- The Bled (2002)

Split EPs

- Alexisonfire / The Bled
- The Bled / From Autumn to Ashes

Non-album tracks

- Masters of Horror – "Nervous Breakdown" (Black Flag cover)
- Tony Hawk's American Wasteland Soundtrack – "House of Suffering" (Bad Brains cover)
- Resident Evil: Extinction Soundtrack – "Asleep on the Frontlines" (Appliantz remix)

Music videos

- You Know Who's Seatbelt (2003)
- I Never Met Another Gemini (2003)
- My Assassin (2005)
- The Last American Cowboy (2005)
- Shadetree Mechanics (2007)
- Mouthbreather (2010)
- Smoke Breaks (2010)
