= RJ Shaughnessy =

RJ Shaughnessy (b. Hollywood, Florida, 1979) is an American photographer, artist, film director, publisher and writer.

== Early life and education ==
Shaughnessy's grandfather Chuck Ax taught in the design department at the Art Center College of Design in Pasadena in the 1950s. Growing up around Ax in Florida, RJ began to develop his discerning eye. Ax would later be the reason RJ attended Art Center.

When he was 18, Shaughnessy was out taking photos during a storm and was suddenly struck by lightning. While recovering in the hospital he immersed himself in photography books, which ultimately made it clear that would be his life's work.

While at Art Center, RJ studied with photographer Paul Jasmin, and his mentorship had a profound effect on RJ's point of view.

Shaughnessy’s first book, Deathcamp was shot while he was attending Art Center and is considered “ a testament to a sense of humanity and community. ” This authentic realism is what Shaughnessy is known for today. Shaughnessy graduated from Art Center College of Design with a Bachelor of Fine Arts.

== Work ==
=== Advertising ===
Shaughnessy's work first garnered public attention in 2008 when he shot the Adidas Originals House Party campaign.

Since then, Shaughnessy has shot global campaigns for Uber, American Eagle, Nike Women, Vodafone, Bacardi, Virgin, Google, Capri Sun, Renault, Stüssy, Adidas with David Beckham, Apple, Ray Ban, Sony PlayStation, Target, Microsoft, Levi's, Nike and Clint Eastwood for Chrysler with Wieden + Kennedy. He has also shot for Magazines such as Dazed & Confused, The Fader, Spin, Vice & Self Service, as well as musicians such as One Direction, Lil Wayne and Odd Future.

Shaughnessy's most recent book, Stay Cool is a quintessential story of summertime and youth in Los Angeles. As the foreword of the book states, "This is the story of youth, where it comes from, why it's here and how quickly it escapes us if we aren't paying attention".

=== Personal life ===
Shaughnessy has lived and worked in Los Angeles since 2000. In 2009, he signed with Los Angeles agency, Giant Artists

== Books ==
- Deathcamp
- Your Golden Opportunity is Comeing Very Soon
- These Photographs Will Heal Your Soul
- Stay Cool

== Exhibitions ==
- Manifest Equality, Los Angeles, CA (group show, 2010)
- Fotofest, Houston, TX (group show, 2010)
- Lead Apron, Los Angeles, CA (solo show, 2010)
- MOPLA Pro'jekt Series L.A., Los Angeles, CA (group show, 2010)
- Giant Artists NOW, Los Angeles, CA (group show, 2010)
- MOPLA and Edgar Varela Fine Arts L.A.t.e Los Angeles After Dark, Los Angeles, CA (group show 2011)
- MOPLA Play It As It Lays, Los Angeles, CA (group show, 2012)
- Galerie Fur Moderne Fotographie; This Land Was Made For You And Me, Berlin, Germany (group show 2012)
- PDN Photo Annual, (group show, 2012)
- Milk and Honey, Los Angeles, CA (group show, 2015)
