= Hands Down (song) =

Single by Dashboard Confessional

from the album A Mark, a Mission, a Brand, a Scar
- Released: 2003
- Genre: Emo; alternative rock
- Length: 3:06
- Label: Vagrant Records
- Songwriter: Chris Carrabba

Dashboard Confessional singles chronology
"Saints and Sailors" (2002)	"Hands Down" (2003)	"Rapid Hope Loss" (2004)

"Hands Down" is a song by Dashboard Confessional that was originally recorded for the acoustic So Impossible EP in 2001, which told the story of a date that Chris Carrabba had in his late teens/early twenties. It was later re-recorded and released as the lead single for the LP A Mark, a Mission, a Brand, a Scar in 2003 with a full band. Carrabba has said that this song is about the best day and date that he's ever had, and introduces it as such at concerts. "Hands Down" was released to radio on July 15, 2003.

== Track listing ==
UK maxi-single

1. "Hands Down" 3:07
2. "I Do" 3:12
3. "Saints and Sailors" (MTV unplugged version) 2:33
4. "Hands Down" (video CD-ROM)

== Chart performance ==
Chart (2003)	Peak position
Scottish Singles Sales (Official Charts)	80
UK Singles (Official Charts)	60
UK Rock & Metal (Official Charts)	6
US Alternative Airplay (Billboard)	8
