= His First Crush =

EP by the Bled
- Released: 2001
- Recorded: May–June 2001 at Flying Blanket Studios
- Genre: Hardcore punk, mathcore
- Length: 17:31
- Label: Ride the Rocket; Sunset Alliance (distributive partner)
- Producer: Bob Hoag

The Bled chronology
His First Crush (2001)	The Bled (2002)

His First Crush is an EP recorded by hardcore punk band the Bled. It was released after only two months of the band being together, on a friend's record company, Rocket Records. Only 1,000 copies were pressed, which sold quickly as interest in the band grew.

== Track listing ==
- All songs written by The Bled
1. "His First Crush" – 3:08
2. "Anvil Piñata" – 3:38
3. "Swatting Flies with a Wrecking Ball" – 2:22
4. "Glitterbomb" – 3:58
5. "F Is for Forensics" – 4:27

== Reissue ==
All of the songs from this album were re-released on Pass the Flask (Reissue).

== Credits ==
- Adam Goss – vocals
- Mike Celi – bass
- Ross Ott – guitar
- Jeremy Ray Talley – guitar, vocals
- Mike Pedicone – drums
- Rosshole666 – Cover photo, layout
