= Joanna Pacitti =

American singer-songwriter (born 1984)

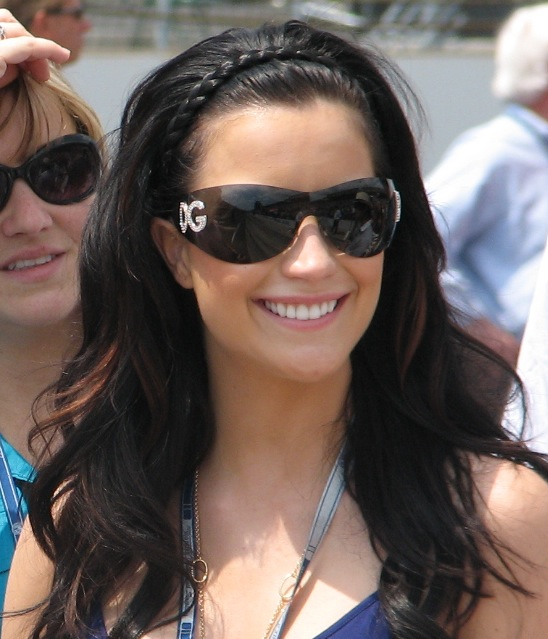
- Pacitti in May 2009

Background information
- Born: Joanna Pacitti; October 6, 1984 (age 41); Philadelphia, Pennsylvania, U.S.
- Genres: R&B; pop rock; soul
- Occupations: Singer-songwriter, actress
- Years active: 1996–2013
- Labels: A&M; Geffen

Joanna Pacitti (born October 6, 1984) is an American singer and actress.

== Career ==
=== Theater ===
In 1996, at age 12, Pacitti was chosen to star in the 20th anniversary revival of the musical Annie after entering a contest sponsored by the department store Macy's. Pacitti starred in 106 performances with the national tour.

Shortly before the show was to open on Broadway, she was terminated by the show's producers. After successfully appealing the initial rejection of her case, Pacitti eventually settled out of court on undisclosed terms.

=== Music career ===
Pacitti began pursuing a pop career in her teenage years. When she was 14 years old she signed a five-year record deal with Ron Fair of A&M records.

In 2003, Pacitti was one of three participants in MTV's First Year, which detailed the process of obtaining various professions over a year. Pacitti is seen attempting to launch a music career in the show.

In 2004, she appeared in an episode of What I Like About You, in which she played a singer named Amber, and sang her song "Ultraviolet."

Pacitti's first single "Let It Slide" was finally released in May 2006 by Geffen Records, and went to radio at the end of June. Her debut album This Crazy Life was released on August 15, 2006, debuting at No. 31 on the Billboard Heatseekers chart.

Throughout 2006 she toured with Sheryl Crow and Nick Lachey, and joined Teen People's Rock'n’Shop Tour in July.

During the first half of 2007, Pacitti recorded the song "Out from Under" for the Bratz: Motion Picture Soundtrack which was re-recorded by Britney Spears for her album "Circus" which was released in 2008.

When Geffen Records underwent budgetary downsizing in 2007, Joanna was cut from the label. She had been working on a follow-up to This Crazy Life at the time.

== American Idol ==
Pacitti auditioned for the eighth season of American Idol in Louisville, Kentucky, in an episode that aired on January 21, 2009. She passed the audition into the Hollywood round. Her career leading up to this event has caused some debate about whether American Idol contestants should be strictly amateur performers.

On the February 11 Idol broadcast, she was advancing into the Top 36. Fox issued a press release the next morning announcing that Pacitti was "ineligible to continue," and was removed from the competition. Unconfirmed tabloid rumors were that the reason behind this was that Pacitti had personal connections to two executives who worked at the Los Angeles office of American Idol's 19 Entertainment. She was replaced on the program by Felicia Barton.

=== Performances ===
Week	Theme	Song(s)	Original artist	Result
Audition	N/A	"We Belong"	Pat Benatar	Advanced
Hollywood	Night 1 round	Unaired	Unaired	Advanced
Hollywood	Group performance	"Some Kind of Wonderful"	Soul Brothers Six	Advanced
Hollywood	N/A	"If I Ain't Got You"	Alicia Keys	Advanced, later disqualified

== Discography ==
=== Albums ===
Year	Album details	Peak	Sales
Year	Album details	US Heat	Sales
2006	This Crazy Life: Released: August 15, 2006; Label: Geffen	31	US Sales: 16,000

=== Singles ===
- "Let It Slide" (2006)

=== Soundtracks ===
- 2001 Legally Blonde Soundtrack – "Watch Me Shine"
- 2002 Cadet Kelly Soundtrack – "Watch Me Shine"
- 2003 My Scene Chelsea Mix – "Just When You're Leaving" (different version from the album version, Promotional Only Release)
- 2004 First Daughter Soundtrack – "Fall"
- 2007 Nancy Drew Soundtrack – "Pretty Much Amazing"
- 2007 Bratz: Motion Picture Soundtrack – "Out from Under"
