= Vindicated (song) =

Single by Dashboard Confessional

from the album Music from and Inspired by Spider-Man 2 and Dusk and Summer
- B-side: "The Warmth of the Sand"
- Released: May 31, 2004
- Recorded: 2003/2004
- Studio: NRG, North Hollywood
- Genre: Alternative rock; emo
- Length: 3:21
- Label: Vagrant; Interscope
- Songwriter: Chris Carrabba
- Producers: Don Gilmore; Gil Norton

Dashboard Confessional singles chronology
"Rapid Hope Loss" (2004)	"Vindicated" (2004)	"Don't Wait" (2006)

"Vindicated" is a song by American rock band Dashboard Confessional. It was written by Chris Carrabba with production from Don Gilmore and Gil Norton. The song was released on May 31, 2004 as the lead single from the soundtrack of the film Spider-Man 2. Played over the film's end credits, "Vindicated" is the theme for the film. The song was included on Dashboard Confessional's fourth studio album, Dusk and Summer (2006) as a bonus track on some pressings and on deluxe edition versions.

Loudwire included the track on their list of The 12 Best Emo Power Ballads.

== Background ==
Dan Marsala, the frontman of the post-hardcore band Story of the Year, revealed that the band was originally offered the lead spot on the Spider-Man 2 soundtrack with "Anthem of Our Dying Day", the second single from the band's debut album Page Avenue (2003). The band ultimately turned it down because the studio wanted them to edit the music video, which had just been directed by Joe Hahn of Linkin Park, to include footage from the film. Marsala admitted they were "scared of the craziness" and worried that fans would make fun of them for the commercial tie-in. Because they passed on the opportunity, the slot went to Dashboard Confessional.

Initially, a song titled "I Need a Sure Thing" was to be used on the Spider-Man 2 soundtrack; but, after having received a special screening of the film, Carrabba penned "Vindicated" in 10 minutes, inspired by and reflecting the theme of the film.

"I Need a Sure Thing" has since then been performed during the Dusk and Summer tour, but not thereafter.

== Reception ==
"Vindicated" was released to radio on June 1, 2004. "Vindicated" received significant airplay on US alternative rock radio stations in late 2004, peaking at #2 on Billboard's Alternative Songs chart. It was held off from the #1 spot by Three Days Grace's "Just Like You".

== Track listing ==
UK maxi single

1. "Vindicated" – 3:20
2. "The Warmth of the Sand" – 4:17
3. "Hands Down" – 3:07
  Track 3 taken from the So Impossible EP.

== Music video ==
Directed by Nigel Dick, the music video, through the view of an individual reading a comic book, features the band performing the song in Doctor Octopus' hideout interspersed with scenes from the film.

== Charts ==
=== Weekly charts ===
Weekly chart performance for "Vindicated"
Chart (2004)	Peak position
Australia (ARIA)	46
Canada (Nielsen BDS)	80
Canada Rock Top 30 (Radio & Records)	14
New Zealand (Recorded Music NZ)	23
US Bubbling Under Hot 100 (Billboard)	3
US Alternative Airplay (Billboard)	2
US Pop Airplay (Billboard)	31

=== Year-end charts ===
Year-end chart performance for "Vindicated"
Chart (2004)	Position
US Modern Rock Tracks (Billboard)	27
