= Hands Down (game) =

Board game

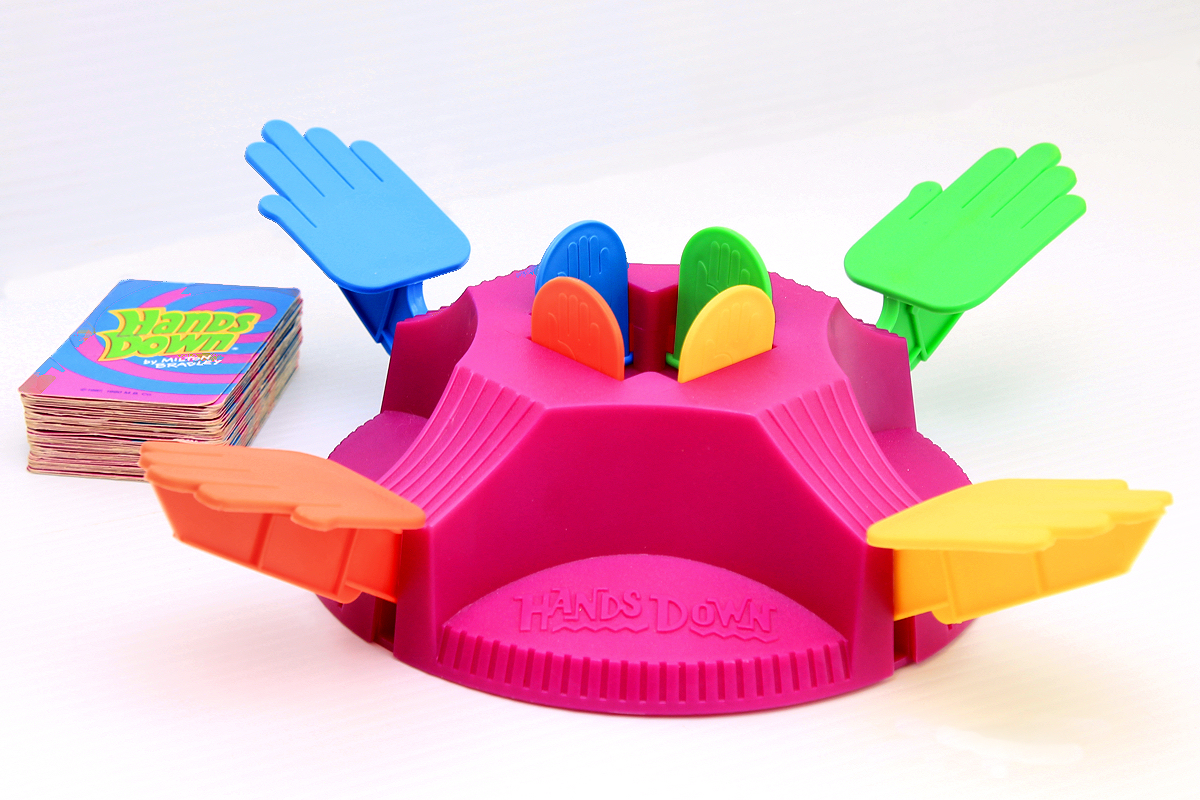
Version of Hands Down game made by Milton Bradley circa 1990.

Hands Down is a board game originally created in 1964 by Marvin Glass and Harvey "Hank" Kramer for Ideal Toy Company. Hasbro, Milton Bradley, and Pressman Toy Corporation have published the game over the years. The game is for ages 5 and up. Hands Down is a card game with a speed/reaction component in the same category as Spoons. There is a plastic game unit with different colored hand-shaped paddles to slap on instead of grabbing a spoon.

== Rules ==
A player is chosen to deal and deals each player four cards. The remaining cards are placed face down to form a draw pile. Players look at their cards but keep them hidden from other players. The player to the left of the dealer begins their turn by drawing one card from the draw pile. If they have a pair of cards of the same number in their hand, they slap down on their hand paddle. The Joker is not wild and does not pair with any of the other cards. It is a bonus card later in the game. When the current player slaps on their hand, the other players slap their hand paddles as quickly as they can. The last player to do so loses. The current player shows their pair and takes one card from the player who lost.

The current player can then repeat the action if they have another pair. If the player has no pairs in their hand, they can either pass their turn, or they can fake having a pair. If the player passes, the play continues to the left. If a player fakes, they pretend like they are going to slap their hand paddle without actually touching it. If any other players touch their paddles, they will lose one card to the current player.

When the draw pile runs out of cards, the current player takes one card from one of the other players’ hands. The game ends when all cards but the Joker have been played. Each player then calculates their score. Each pair is worth one point. The Joker is worth two points. The player with the most points wins. If there is a tie, the tied players total the face value of their pairs with the Joker being worth 20 points. The player with the highest total breaks the tie.
