= Don't Wait (Dashboard Confessional song) =

Single by Dashboard Confessional

from the album Dusk and Summer
- Released: May 23, 2006
- Genre: Emo; alternative rock
- Length: 4:05
- Label: Vagrant Records
- Songwriter(s): Chris Carrabba

Dashboard Confessional singles chronology
"Vindicated" (2004)	"Don't Wait" (2006)	"Rooftops and Invitations" (2006)

"Don't Wait" is the first single from the album Dusk and Summer by Dashboard Confessional. The song was written by the lead singer of Dashboard Confessional, Chris Carrabba. It is about living for the day, that 'the moment is now'. "Don't Wait" was released to radio on May 23, 2006.

== Music video ==
The music video for "Don't Wait" was directed by Rich Lee. It features lead singer Chris Carrabba first in a bedroom, his suspected girlfriend leaves and soon time starts going faster and faster. Chris, now in the city walks oblivious to the fact that time is speeding ahead, Time gets faster, days and nights, seasons, Chris witnesses billboards changing and buildings being constructed. Finally so far ahead it seems civilization has ended, greenery takes over the city and eventually all the skyscrapers have been worn down. At this point, time goes in reverse, back to the moment where his girlfriend left him, but this time, he follows her instead of staying in his room.

The video suggests that it takes place in New York City but was filmed mostly in downtown Los Angeles. Several time-lapse shots of New York City are seen in between, as well as snow during the winter, but the shots of Chris walking through town take place in the historical sector of Downtown Los Angeles.

== Track listings ==
- US iTunes digital download (May 23, 2006)
1. "Don't Wait" - 4:05
2. "In a Big Country (Cover Song)" - 4:04
- UK CD single (August 24, 2006)
1. "Don't Wait"
2. "Stolen" [Live/Acoustic]
3. "Ghost of a Good Thing" [Live/Acoustic]
4. "Don't Wait" [Enhanced Video]
- First UK 7" vinyl single (August 24, 2006)
1. "Don't Wait"
2. "Rooftops And Invitations" [Live/Acoustic]
- Second UK 7" vinyl single (white) (August 24, 2006)
1. "Don't Wait" - 4:05
2. "Ghost of a Good Thing" [Live/Acoustic]

== Charts ==
Chart (2006)	Peak position
Scotland (OCC)	62
UK Singles (OCC)	68
US Billboard Hot 100	80
US Alternative Airplay (Billboard)	17
