= Nike Women's Advertising =

Nike Women's Advertising is Nike advertisements towards women.

Although Nike started aggressively advertising towards women in the 1990s, they were not the first athletic company to promote their products towards women. According to Shelly Lucas's article, "Nike's Commercial Solution: Girls, Sneakers, and Salvation", "In 1981, Reebok, one of Nike's competitors in the athletic shoe industry, chose to make women its primary target market." Because aerobics became popular among women, Reebok pursued that opportunity by advertising towards women. Nike executives, however, did not view aerobics as a sport, and as a result, did not immediately take advantage of the opportunity.

Eventually, Reebok's strategic move to advertise towards women proved to be a success, showing a 13% rise in market share (while Nike's market share was declining by 28%). Prior to 1987, there were no Nike advertisements directed toward women, because it was believed that it would compromise Nike’s authentic and serious sports image. Finally, in 1987, Nike slowly changed course, with more women in its advertisements, but it was not really until the 1990s that it ramped up its focus on woman as an athlete, to compete with Reebok. Initially, ads in 1987 were too aggressive and failed to appeal to women. Nevertheless, many people considered the 1987 ads to be a failure. Three years later, Nike advertised in a different way, this time creating ads that targeted women’s emotions, and giving them a feeling, and sense, of community. According to Shelly Lucas, Nike created a team of

  ...about 40 female employees from various Nike, and Wieden & Kennedy (Nike's advertising agency) departments, and let this team work "together on new women’s campaign".[1] This team of women eventually created advertising campaigns revolving around three "big ideas": empowerment, entitlement, and product emphasis; these became influential among women throughout the nation, according to Jean Grow and Joyce Wolburg.[2]
