= Maureen Egan =

American writer/director

Maureen Egan is a writer/director who has directed several music videos, including the MTV2 Award-winning "Screaming Infidelities" for Dashboard Confessional. Her parents were actors Richard Egan and Patricia Hardy. Her brother is Richard Egan Jr., who founded the record label Vagrant Records, which has signed many of the artist for which she directs music videos.

Egan is one half of a directing team (with partner and spouse, Matthew Barry) whose videos include Saves the Day's "At Your Funeral", Alkaline Trio's "Stupid Kid", Dashboard Confessional's follow up video "Saints and Sailors", Face to Face's "The New Way", Reggie and the Full Effect's "Congratulations Smack and Katy", which was nominated for an MTVu Woodie Award and won the audience choice award at the 2003 Turkey Shoot music video festival.

In addition to directing, Egan adapted a novel for MTV Original Movies, and produced and edited the documentary Punk Rock Eats Its Own, an official selection for the American Film Institute's Music Documentary Series. She produced the MTV documentary special Far From Home Movies, and has also earned two Gold Records for her contributions to two Dashboard Confessional records. She also co-founded Serve-Us Station, a commercial promotion company responsible for producing the tour and album promotions for My Chemical Romance, Fall Out Boy, Robin Thicke, among others.
