= Alter the Ending =

Studio album by Dashboard Confessional
- Released: November 10, 2009 (U.S.)
- Recorded: 2007–09
- Genres: Emo, alternative rock
- Labels: Vagrant; DGC; Interscope
- Producers: Butch Walker; Adam Schlesinger (co.); Bill Lefler; John Lefler

Dashboard Confessional chronology
The Shade of Poison Trees (2007)	Alter the Ending (2009)	Swiss Army Bro-Mance (2010)

Singles from Alter the Ending
- 1. "Belle of the Boulevard" Released: October 13, 2009

Alter the Ending is the sixth studio album recorded by American rock band Dashboard Confessional, released through Vagrant, DGC and Interscope Records on November 10, 2009. The album was released in both a one disc standard version and a two disc deluxe edition which contains a second disc of acoustic versions of the 12 songs on the album. The album's first single is "Belle of the Boulevard".

Alter the Ending received some mixed or average reviews from critics, with some saying the album showed great maturity and others alluding to overproduction and its limitations.

The album debuted at number 19 on the Billboard 200, number six on the Billboard Rock Albums chart and number five on the Alternative Albums chart.

== Promotion and release ==
The first track from the album made available was "Even Now", a clip of which was posted online on January 5, 2009. The entire song appeared on the NCIS soundtrack in February. On February 14, an acoustic version of "Even Now" was made available as a free download. Dashboard Confessional announced in September that their sixth album would be titled Alter the Ending and released on November 10. They also declared they would be touring in support of the album with New Found Glory, Meg & Dia and Never Shout Never, before it was cancelled because of a last minute family situation. A second track, "Belle of the Boulevard", was made available for listening at Radio Sophie on September 17, and was posted on MySpace a few days later.

The album artwork and final track listing were revealed in October, with the album's first single, "Belle of the Boulevard", being released on October 13, 2009. Upon the need to decide whether the album should be full-on electric rock project or a stripped-down acoustic piece, frontman Chris Carrabba came up with the solution that it could be both, as the album was revealed to be available in a two disc deluxe edition, with the second CD containing acoustic versions of the album. Carrabba has said that the acoustic set still features the full band, but with a minimalist approach similar to when the group was mostly a solo project in its early days. Carrabba has spoken of the positives of having both versions, even admitting to not liking one of the full-band versions and its acoustic becoming his "favorite song on the record."Alter the Ending was made available for streaming at MySpace on November 3, before being released on November 10. On November 25, 2009, a music video was released for "Belle of the Boulevard"; it was filmed the previous month in New Orleans. A short acoustic tour with New Found Glory was also announced, after the cancellation of the first attempt, running through December 2009. Between February and April 2010, the band supported Bon Jovi on their US arena tour.

== Reception ==
Professional ratings
Aggregate scores
Source	Rating
Metacritic	(58/100)
Review scores
Source	Rating
AbsolutePunk	(81%)
Allmusic	2.5/5 stars
Alternative Press	3/5 stars
The A.V. Club	C−
Entertainment Weekly	B−
IGN	(8.9/10)
PopMatters	3/10 stars
Rolling Stone	4/5 stars
Slant Magazine	2/5 stars
Spin	(7/10)

Alter the Ending was met with mixed or average reviews, receiving an aggregated score of 58 out of 100 from 9 reviews on Metacritic. Rolling Stone praised the album with a four out of five rating, saying "The emo godfather's sixth album proves he's also gotten better in that span." IGN's Brian Linder was also very positive, he commended the maturity of the record and said "Dashboard has shown on this release that they're capable of gracefully maturing and creating age-appropriate rock that stays true to their musical roots." Linder also lauded the band's deluxe edition acoustics; "Carrabba has always been a great unplugged performer, but there's just something about these songs that gives them greater emotional resonance when stripped of the traditional trappings of emo-pop." AbsolutePunk reviewer Chris Fallon gave the album 81%, offering particular approval to the album's acoustic bonus material; "Alter the Ending actually finds it's [sic] biggest success in a deluxe edition package". He queried the band's choice to go back into "full-fledged rock band mode", following frontman Chris Carrabba's return to his acoustic six-string to release their previous effort The Shade of Poison Trees, he says, "Alter the Ending's biggest drawback is the big production value over pre-determined substance, which hinders the potential of the weight these songs carry."

Slant Magazine was critical of the release, giving it a two out of five rating. Reviewer Eric Henderson disparaged the lyrics, saying some songs are "marred by lyrics I find it hard to believe even a seven-year-old girl would find exciting." He also criticized the release of the deluxe edition, stating "Unfortunately, what may have in some hands come off as a remarkable display of versatility only reinforces Carrabba's limitations as a songwriter... the same song is the same song is the same song." The A.V. Club reviewer Chris Martins awarded the album a C−, indicating he thought Dashboard had meandered down the wrong course with Butch Walker, as "he comically overproduces the damn thing."

=== Chart performance ===
Alter the Ending debuted at number 19 on the Billboard 200 chart.

Chart	Peak position
US Billboard 200	19
US Top Alternative Albums (Billboard)	5
US Top Rock Albums (Billboard)	6

== Track listing ==
All tracks are written by Chris Carrabba.

No.	Title	Length
1.	"Get Me Right"	3:15
2.	"Until Morning"	3:44
3.	"Everybody Learns from Disaster"	3:33
4.	"Belle of the Boulevard"	4:02
5.	"I Know About You"	3:07
6.	"Alter the Ending"	3:24
7.	"Blame It on the Changes"	4:11
8.	"Even Now"	2:43
9.	"The Motions"	4:02
10.	"No News Is Bad News"	3:54
11.	"Water and Bridges"	3:36
12.	"Hell on the Throat"	3:10
Total length:		42:41

=== Deluxe edition ===
No.	Title	Length
1.	"Get Me Right" (acoustic)	3:15
2.	"Until Morning" (acoustic)	3:33
3.	"Everybody Learns from Disaster" (acoustic)	3:24
4.	"Belle of the Boulevard" (acoustic)	4:13
5.	"I Know About You" (acoustic)	3:06
6.	"Alter the Ending" (acoustic)	3:10
7.	"Blame It on the Changes" (acoustic)	4:05
8.	"Even Now" (acoustic)	2:41
9.	"The Motions" (acoustic)	3:59
10.	"No News Is Bad News" (acoustic)	3:58
11.	"Water and Bridges" (acoustic)	3:36
12.	"Hell on the Throat" (acoustic)	2:54
Total length:		41:54

=== Bonus tracks ===
No.	Title	Length
1.	"Truth of the Matter" (iTunes bonus track)	3:22
2.	"The Cut and Run Routine" (iTunes pre-order bonus track)	3:29
3.	"Truth of the Matter" (acoustic; Amazon MP3 bonus track)	3:25

== Personnel ==
Dashboard Confessional

- Chris Carrabba – lead vocals, guitar
- John Lefler – guitar, piano, additional vocals
- Scott Schoenbeck – bass guitar
- Mike Marsh – drums

Additional musicians

- Bill Lefler – percussion, cello, and additional vocals (disc 2)
- Tony Visconti – string arrangements (track 1:4)
- Mario J. McNulty – string engineer (track 1:4)

Technical personnel (disc 1)

- Butch Walker – producer, engineer
- Adam Schlesinger – co-producer
- Geoff Sanoff – engineer
- Ryan Williams – engineer
- Matt LaPlant – assistant engineer
- Joe Zook – mixing
- Daniel Piscina – mixing assistant
- Ted Jensen – mastering

Technical personnel (disc 2)

- Bill Lefler – producer, mixing
- John Lefler – producer
- Craig "The Regulator" Frank – engineer
- Peter Doell – mastering
