= Fiddler Records =

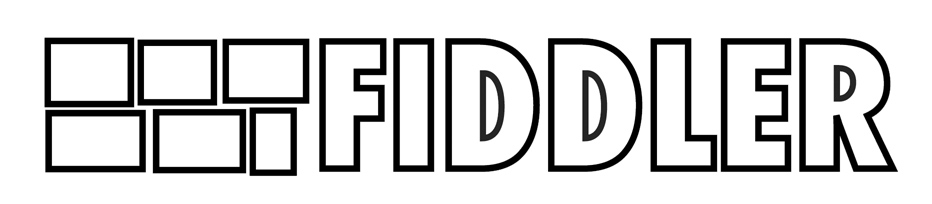
- Fiddler Logo

Background information
- Origin: Miami, Florida, U.S.
- Genres: Rock; punk rock; experimental rock; emo; hardcore punk
- Years active: 1996–2006
- Website: fiddlerrecords.com

Fiddler Records was a small independent record label serving as the launch pad for several artists seminal to the pop, punk and emo genres. Starting as the brainchild of 16-year-old entrepreneur Amy Fleisher Madden in 1996, the label became well known for its early releases from marquee artists Dashboard Confessional and New Found Glory. Over the course of 10 years, Fiddler Records developed a steady roster of successful artists such as The Bled, The Higher, Recover, Juliette & The Licks, Name Taken and Classic Case.

Currently, the Fiddler Records catalog is managed by Animal Manufacturing Co. Animal Manufacturing has released vinyl for both Recover and Name Taken and has helped keep the spirit of Fiddler alive.

== History ==
=== The Origin ===
Fiddler Records started in 1996 by Amy Fleisher Madden at age 16. What started as Amy passing out photocopies of her fanzine, Fiddler Jones, in the parking lot of Miami punk venue Cheers, became one of the most historic pop-punk labels of the late 1990s and early 2000s.

After saving $600 from promoting several shows over the course of several months at Cheers, Amy invested the money in a 7” by the band Vacant Andys (led by then unknown Chris Carrabba of Dashboard Confessional). The gold vinyl release was titled Anodyne, and marked the first release from both an artist and label showing signs of much bigger things on the horizon.

=== Getting Off The Ground ===
Fiddler began building a roster with several records, including the label's fourth release, New Found Glory's It's All About the Girls (1997), which assisted the band in breaking nationwide. It eventually sold more than 80,000 copies, as New Found Glory went on to pop-punk stardom earning multiple gold records for major labels. Fiddler began climbing the music industry ladder by signing to the Toledo, Ohio-based small distribution outfit Lumberjack Distribution, helping to develop some of the roster’s core releases from such artists as Recover, The Agency, and The Grey AM.

In March 2000, Fiddler released The Swiss Army Romance, a solo record from Chris Carrabba’s solo project titled Dashboard Confessional. The record quickly garnered critical national acclaim, and within a few months the first pressing of CDs had sold out and Carrabba left his band Further Seems Forever to pursue Dashboard Confessional full-time. In order to meet the swelling demand, The Swiss Army Romance was sold from Fiddler to the MCA Records subsidiary Drive-Thru Records.

=== 15 Seconds ===
In November 2002, Fiddler signed a label/distribution deal with MCA Records. In March 2003, MCA folded into Geffen Records, which inherited Fiddler's contract. While Fiddler’s agreement with MCA kept them bound to Geffen, during the three years under this arrangement, the now fully staffed label released records from The Bled (who later went to Vagrant Records), The Higher, Poulain, and Salem.

In 2005, Fiddler parted ways with Geffen and signed a distribution agreement with RED Distribution, where they released records from Name Taken, The Higher, Juliette & The Licks and a release from At All Cost under Fiddler’s sub-label “The Imprint.”

=== Winding Down ===
After many staff changes and band break-ups, Fiddler was dismantled in 2006. Once again solely operated by Amy, Fiddler closed and left the label website with only the words “Gone fission' Fiddler no longer exists in the physical nor the metaphysical world. Thanks for the postcards. We're all out of cats.”

=== Life After Death ===
In late 2009, Amy started Animal Manufacturing Co, resurrected the historic label’s catalog, remanifesting it back into the physical, metaphysical, and digital world once again, ensuring that the legacy of Fiddler lives on.

== Discography ==
- FR001 - Vacant Andys - Anodyne (1996, 7")
- FR002 - The Skalidays - We Outgrew the Water Fountain (1996, 7")
- FR003 - The Skalidays - Late Again (1997)
- FR004 - New Found Glory - "It's All About The Girls" - (1997, CDEP)
- FR005 - Milkshed - "Time" (1997)
- FR006 - The Agency - "Fork, Knife and Spoon" (1998, CDEP)
- FR007 - Poopy Pants - "Anal Devastation" (1998, CDEP)
- FR008 - Various Artists - "The Shortest Distance: A South Florida Compilation" (1999, CD)
- FR009 - The Grey A.M. - "Move the Monuments East (1999, CD)
- FR010 - The Agency - "Engines" (2000)
- FR011 - Dashboard Confessional - "The Swiss Army Romance" (2000, CD)
- FR012 - Dashboard Confessional - The Drowning (2001, CDEP)
- FR013 - Seville - "Waiting in Seville (2001, CDEP)
- FR014 - Recover - "Ceci N'est Pas Recover" (2002, CDEP)
- FR015 - Poulain - "For Passengers" (2003, CDEP)
- FR016 - The Bled - "Pass the Flask" (2003)
- FR017 - The Higher - "Star Is Dead" (2004, CDEP)
- FR018 - Salem - "Love It or Leave Me" (2003, CDEP)
- FR019 - Name Taken - "Hold On" (2004, CD)
- FR020 - Juliette & The Licks - "...Like a Bolt of Lightning" (2004, CDEP)
- FR021 - The Higher - "Histrionics" (2005, CD)
- FR022 - Juliette & The Licks - "You're Speaking My Language" (2005, CD)
- FR023 -
- FR024 - Maida - "Renaissance In Reverse (2005, CD)
- FR025 - Classic Case - "Dress to Depress" (2005)
- IMP001 - At All Cost - "Shattered Dreams and Bourgeois Schemes" (2004, CDEP)
- IMP002 - Maida - "Remove the Funeral Attire" (2004, CDEP)
