= Chris Carrabba =

American singer

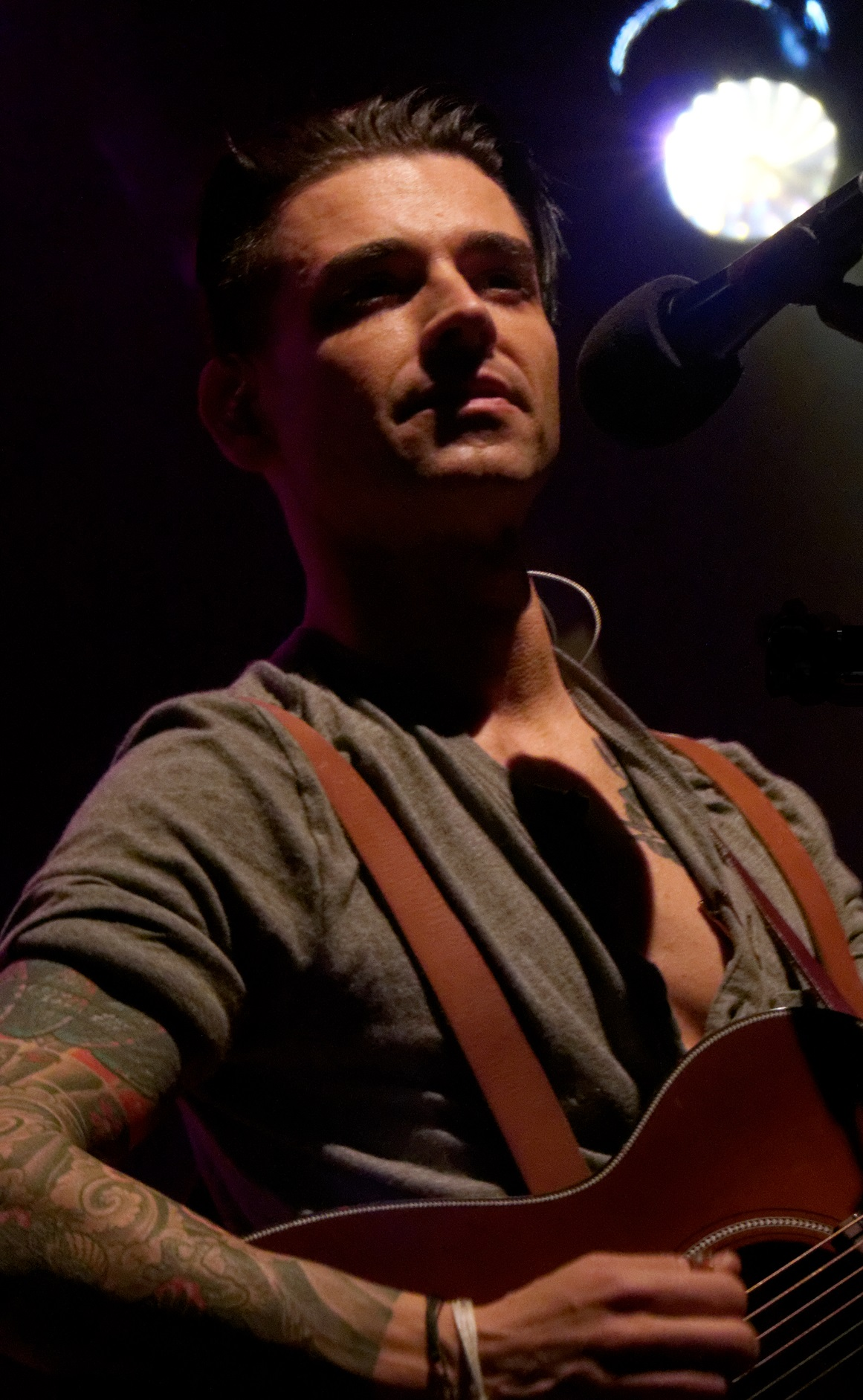
- Carrabba performing in 2015

Background information
- Also known as: Chris "Ender" Carrabba
- Born: Christopher Andrew Carrabba; April 10, 1975 (age 51); West Hartford, Connecticut, U.S.
- Origin: Boca Raton, Florida
- Genres: Alternative rock, indie rock, emo, acoustic rock
- Instruments: Vocals, guitar, piano, keyboards
- Years active: 1991–present

Christopher Andrew Carrabba (born April 10, 1975) is an American musician who is the primary songwriter, lead singer, and guitarist of the band Dashboard Confessional, lead singer of the band Further Seems Forever, and lead vocalist for the folk band Twin Forks.

Angelique Jackson of Variety conferred the title of "crowned king of the sad boys" on Carrabba. Andrew Leahey of AllMusic called him "the poster boy for a generation of emo fans in the early 2000s."

== Early life and education ==
Born in West Hartford, Connecticut, United States, Carrabba's parents divorced when he was three. At age 16, he moved with his mother Anne, brother Nick, stepbrother and stepfather to Boca Raton, Florida. Carrabba remains close to some relatives on his paternal side, but is not close to his father Andrew.

As a teenager, Carrabba was interested in skateboarding and passionate about music. In high school, he started singing in his choir. At 15, his two cousins found a guitar in their basement, presumably belonging to their father but the true owner is unknown. Carrabba ended up with the guitar when one of them figured he would be the only one who could play it. After graduating from Boca Raton Community High School, Carrabba became more serious about music and joined his first band, The Vacant Andys, and matriculated to Florida Atlantic University to study education.

At college, alongside studies, Carrabba played with the Vacant Andys and, later, with the Agency, which featured Chris Carrabba on their second LP, ENGINES. This was the first recording to feature both Mike Marsh and Chris Carrabba before Mike Marsh became Dashboard Confessional's full-time drummer. For several years, Chris taught at an elementary school in South Florida and played with the group Further Seems Forever.

Dashboard Confessional was born when Chris recorded the Drowning EP with Fiddler Records. "I started (Dashboard) as a side project from the band I was in," says Carrabba. "I was going through something really tough at the time and since I don't write in a journal, this is what I did with it. It was a good way to get it out of my system. I never thought anyone would hear these songs, but I played some for my friends and one of them who owned a little label talked me into recording." The name Dashboard Confessional comes from the song "The Sharp Hint of New Tears." The lyric "On the way home, this car hears my confessions" brought to mind the phrase "Dashboard Confessional."

Carrabba was a special education teacher at J.C. Mitchell Elementary School prior to his success with Dashboard Confessional, often keeping a guitar in his office to write songs during downtime.

== Personal life ==
In 2008, just as he was wrapping up work on the sixth Dashboard Confessional album, Carrabba's sister was in a serious car accident that put her in a coma for several months. "I was torn between being with her through most of her waking hours until we were kicked out of the hospital at the end of their shifts and going home and doing my work," he said.

In June of 2020, during the COVID-19 Pandemic, Chris Carrabba was out riding his motorcycle when a piece of debris left over from an unrelated previous vehicular accident became lodged in the front components of his motorbike, ejecting Carrabba onto the pavement. Carrabba was hospitalized with multiple severe physical injuries, including bilateral fractures of his shoulder bones and other upper arm bones, broken ribs, extensive bruising, as well as several extreme muscle lacerations. The injuries required significant reconstructive surgery, leaving Carrabba hospital bound for weeks. Due to muscle atrophy and the physical extent of his injuries, Carrabba left the hospital with limited mobility and severely damaged muscle memory. He had to undergo months of physical therapy and muscle training just to regain the ability to perform basic every-day tasks. Having had to entirely relearn how to play the guitar, it took 8 months before Carrabba was able to perform on stage again.

== Career ==
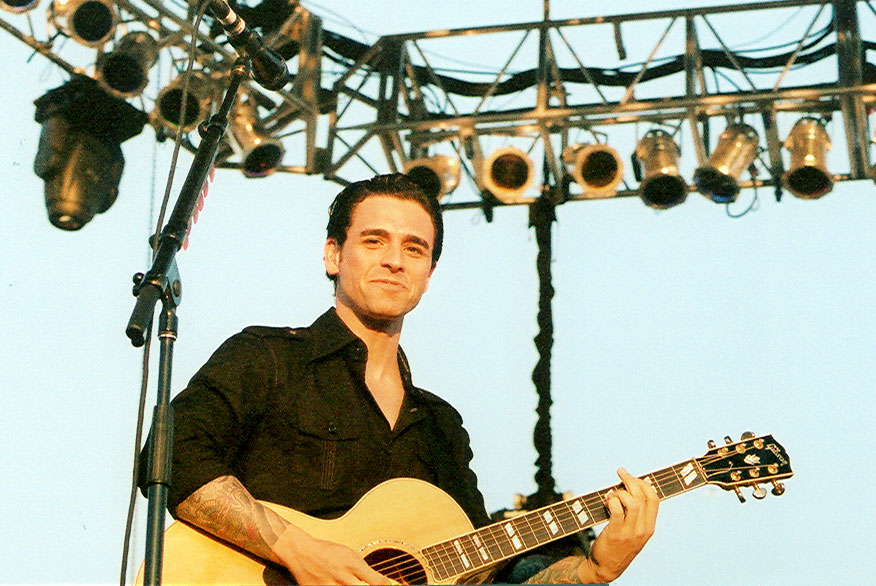
Carrabba in 2005

Carrabba started his career with the Vacant Andys. In 1998, while playing with the Vacant Andys, he filled in on guitar in New Found Glory, when regular guitarist Chad Gilbert was on tour with his other band, Shai Hulud. In 2001, he joined the band Further Seems Forever for their debut album The Moon is Down, before moving on to found Dashboard Confessional. In 2002, Dashboard Confessional won the MTV2 Award at MTV Music Awards for the video for "Screaming Infidelities." The video was considered the "dark horse" nominee at the time, as it was up against The Strokes, The Hives, Norah Jones, Nappy Roots, and Musiq. The video was directed by Maureen Egan and Matthew Barry.

=== Reuniting with Further Seems Forever ===
It was announced on August 24, 2010, that Further Seems Forever would be reuniting with original vocalist Chris Carrabba with the release of a teaser video featuring rehearsal footage of the song "The Moon Is Down."

=== Covered in the Flood ===
In November 2011, Carrabba released Covered in the Flood, an album of covers exclusively on his solo US tour. The album contains 10 tracks originally performed by artists that include R.E.M., Big Star, Guy Clark, Justin Townes Earle and the Replacements.

=== Guest appearances ===
- Carrabba appears on the Hot Rod Circuit song "Unfaithful".
- Carrabba provides backing vocals on the Say Anything song "Retarded in Love", on the Twothirtyeight album Regulate the Chemicals, and on the New Found Glory cover of the song "The Promise", which is featured on the album From the Screen to Your Stereo Part II.
- Carrabba also appears in Notar's song "Reach."
- Carrabba appears in nothing,nowhere.'s song "Hopes Up", featured on the album REAPER.
- Carrabba is featured on a version of the band Neck Deep's hit single "December".
- Carrabba was a special guest DJ at Emo Nite LA's second anniversary party.
- Carrabba is featured in the Yellowcard song, "The Places We'll Go".
- Carrabba is featured on Ruston Kelly's cover of the Dashboard Confessional song "Screaming Infidelities".
- Carrabba is featured on Busted's re-recording of their 2002 song "Everything I Knew" from their album Greatest Hits 2.0 (guest features edition).
