= Tear from the Red =

Studio album by Poison the Well
- Released: February 19, 2002
- Recorded: October 15, 2001 – November 25, 2001
- Studios: Studio 13, Deerfield Beach, Florida, United States
- Genres: Metalcore; melodic metalcore; post-hardcore; pop screamo
- Length: 30:26
- Labels: Trustkill; Ides of March; Good Life; Undying; Roadrunner; Shock; Rise
- Producers: Jeremy Staska; Poison the Well

Poison the Well chronology
| The Opposite of December... A Season of Separation (1999) | Tear from the Red (2002) | You Come Before You (2003) |

Singles from Tear from the Red
- 1. "Botchla" Released: February 19, 2002

Parchment cover
- Tear from the Red alternate cover showing the parchment paper.

Vinyl cover

2012 Reissue cover
- The Opposite of December / Tear from the Red 2012 reissue cover.

Tear from the Red is the second full-length album by American metalcore band Poison the Well. It was released via Trustkill Records on February 19, 2002. The album was the band's first release to appear on Billboard's Independent Albums and Heatseekers Albums charts (in March 2002), and was responsible for landing Poison the Well a major record label deal. It also featured the band's first single and music video for "Botchla". The release received numerous reissues on various formats over the years through such record labels as Good Life Recordings, Roadrunner Records, Shock Records, Rise Records, Ides of March, and Undying Music, and was digitally remastered in 2012.

In promotion of the album, Poison the Well toured the United States several times between November 2001 and October 2002, crossing into Canada twice. The bands that accompanied Poison the Well on these tours include Unearth, Sworn Enemy, Hatebreed, God Forbid, Shadows Fall, American Nightmare, Converge, Most Precious Blood, No Warning, Throwdown, Bane, Hemlock, Eighteen Visions, Codeseven, From Autumn to Ashes, Blood Has Been Shed, Glassjaw, Recover, Vex Red, Strung Out, Rise Against, Rufio, Kittie, Killswitch Engage, The Promise Ring, The International Noise Conspiracy, Thursday, Cursive, The Lawrence Arms, and Common Rider. Poison the Well also performed at notable festivals like Stillborn Festival in West Babylon, New York, the New England Metal and Hardcore Festival in Worcester, Connecticut, Start Your Lawnmower in Cleveland, Ohio, and the Skate and Surf Festival in Asbury Park, New Jersey.

Not unlike The Opposite of December... A Season of Separation's previous promotional tours, Tear from the Red's tours also featured a great deal of member changes for the band. The album was recorded with vocalist Jeffrey Moreira, bassist Iano Dovi, drummer Christopher Hornbrook, and guitarists Ryan Primack and Derek Miller. During the ensuing tours, Dovi was replaced, first by Nicolas Schuhmann, then by Geoffrey Bergman, the latter of which remained with the band to record their follow-up release You Come Before You. Moreira also suffered throat problems early in the touring season, a complication that had surfaced at the end of The Opposite of December... A Season of Separation's promotional tours; Poison the Well's roadie Rick filled in as vocalist for a handful of shows.

== Recording ==
Poison the Well had originally planned to record their second album in April 2001, after returning from a booked Asian tour, with a scheduled release date of August 1, 2001. At that time, the release was to be made up of eleven original songs and a cover song. The cover song was quickly dropped and the band announced that they would instead track twelve original songs. Once the Asian tour was cancelled, the band took the opportunity to spend more time writing the album and opted to tour North America during the spring and summer of 2001. Tear from the Red was written over a period of one year, from the summer of 2000 to the summer of 2001, during which time the band played with five different bassists: Alan Landsman, Michael Gordillo, Javier Van Huss, Albert and Iano Dovi each contributed to the songwriting and arrangements. Gordillo would have performed on the album, had it been recorded as originally planned in April 2001, and had it not been for his untimely departure.

The band returned to Studio 13 in Deerfield Beach, Florida on October 15, 2001 to begin the recording of nine original songs with producer Jeremy Staska. While in studio, the band added an interlude titled "Karsey Street", which sampled a speech uttered by Marlon Brando toward the end of the film Apocalypse Now. The title referenced 213 Karsey Street in Highland Park, New Jersey, a house where NORA drummer Chris Ross lived, along with Poison the Well's roadie Rick, where the band had previously watched the movie and were planning to stay during their upcoming tour. Another song from the album, "Lazzaro" also references Apocalypse Now. Poison the Well wrapped up the Tear from the Red studio recording session on November 25, 2001, for a total production cost of $6,000.

== Release and packaging ==
Converge vocalist Jacob Bannon was originally consulted to design the artwork for Tear from the Red, through his graphic design company Atomic! Information Design. Banon had designed the artwork for the band's two prior releases, The Opposite of December... A Season of Separation and the reissue of Distance Makes the Heart Grow Fonder, but the band ultimately hired Demon Hunter bassist Don Clark at Asterik Studio to do the job. The compact disc edition booklet pressed through Trustkill Records was designed to include a semi-transparent parchment paper before and after every page, including one before the front cover. This resulted with a more desaturated look and feel, an effect embellished by the use of heavyweight paper.

Poison the Well planned to release Tear from the Red on Valentine's Day, February 14, 2002. However, the date fell on a Thursday and Trustkill Records was forced to work with music industry standards of releasing new music on Tuesdays. The date was therefore set for the first Tuesday after Valentine's Day, February 19, 2002. Trustkill Records began accepting pre-orders on February 8, 2002, and any orders placed prior to the release date included a free 18" by 24" poster.

The vinyl version was licensed to Good Life Recordings in Belgium and Ides of March in the United States. Ides of March, operated by Matt Fox of the band Shai Hulud, released Tear from the Red on 12" vinyl in mid-March 2002 under catalog number NCC1709, pressed on a choice of solid red vinyl (limited to 1000 copies) and clear gold vinyl (limited to 1000 copies). The artwork used for the Ides of March vinyl had a darker red, almost burgundy, with no birds on the bottom. These sold out in a matter of weeks and on May 14, 2002, a second pressing was available on a choice of clear vinyl (limited to 1000 copies) and pink vinyl (limited to 300 copies). Good Life Recordings pressed the album on a pictured 12" vinyl under catalog number GL078 in the summer of 2002. The first pressing (limited to 2000 copies) featured an orange Good Life Recordings logo while the second pressing (also limited to 2000 copies) changed it to a blue logo.

In the spring of 2002, Trustkill Records signed a deal with Indonesia's Undying Records for a selection of their releases to be reissued in Asia on cassette tape. Through this licensing deal, Poison the Well's Tear from the Red was pressed on tape and released in July 2002 under catalog number UM003. Most copies were sold in Asia but Trustkill Records received a number of copies for sale in North America through their webstore.

In addition to pressing compact discs (catalog number TK37), Trustkill Records offered a limited edition Tear from the Red 7" vinyl containing the songs "Turn Down Elliot" and "Pieces of You in Me". The 7" vinyl was released on August 27, 2002, under catalog number TK37.5, and was available on a choice of transparent red vinyl (limited to 1000 copies), transparent orange vinyl (limited to 1000 copies) and transparent gold vinyl (limited to 200 copies).

In August 2004, Trustkill Records signed a deal with Roadrunner Records for a selection of their releases to be reissued in foreign markets such as the United Kingdom and Europe. Through this licensing deal, Poison the Well's Tear from the Red was finally made available locally for those regions. The album was re-released in France, Germany and the Netherlands on October 11, 2004 and in the United Kingdom on October 25, 2004 under catalog number RR8221. The Roadrunner Records version of Tear from the Red did not include the parchment paper in the booklet and was printed with more vibrant colors. It also included a parental advisory printed on the bottom right of the front cover and included the "Botchla" music video in an enhanced multimedia section.

In early 2007, Trustkill Records signed a deal with Shock Records for a selection of their past releases to be distributed in Australasia. Through this distribution deal, Poison the Well's album Tear from the Red was finally made available locally in Australia and New Zealand. The distribution deal originally had Trustkill Records ship a container of already-pressed compact discs to Shock Records for retail marketing through their chain of stores. These American-made compact discs were released to the Australasia market on June 2, 2007 and were identical to the ones sold in the United States. After quickly selling out of the American-made discs, Shock Records began repressing the release directly in Australia. The Opposite of December... A Season of Separation and Tear from the Red were each pressed in separate jewel cases baring no barcodes on the back cover; each was given the same catalog number TK24103. The two jewel cases were packaged together in a slipcase which contained the barcode for retail stores and the catalog number TK24103, and the double-disc release was sold as a single unit starting on February 16, 2008. Shock Records simultaneously released similar packages for Trustkill Records' Terror, Hopesfall, Throwdown, Walls of Jericho, Most Precious Blood and Bleeding Through. The Shock Records version did not include the parchment paper in the booklet and instead printed the artwork on a textured paper. The yellow colored artwork on the upper-hand portion of the artwork was desaturated to an off-white.

On March 25, 2008, Trustkill Records re-released The Opposite of December... A Season of Separation and Tear from the Red in a special double-LP gatefold packaging under catalog number TK110. Each side of the gatefold cover featured the front artwork of each album (The Opposite of December... A Season of Separation on the front and Tear from the Red on the back). The release was pressed on a choice of blue and red vinyl (limited to 331 copies), white and yellow vinyl (limited to 336 copies), and white and pink vinyl (limited to 661 copies). Trustkill Records simultaneously re-released two other double-LP packages from its past roster: Throwdown's Haymaker / Vendetta and Walls of Jericho's With Devils Amongst Us All / All Hail the Dead.

In 2011, Sumerian Records attempted to purchase a license to reissue The Opposite of December... A Season of Separation and Tear from the Red from Trustkill Records but was unsuccessful. On May 4, 2012, it was revealed that Rise Records had secured the rights to the reissues and would be releasing them in the summer of 2012. Unlike Trustkill Records' 2008 gatefold vinyl repress, Rise Records went to the extent of having all of the audio content remastered and designing a new artwork and layout. The two albums were digitally remastered by Will Putney, while the artwork was adapted by merging two releases' original artworks together. After some delays, Rise Records reissued the 19-song, double-release compilation The Opposite of December... A Season of Separation / Tear from the Red on November 20, 2012 as catalog number RR176. The set was offered as a single compact disc edition packaged in a digipak, a gatefold double LP and digitally through streaming and download. The double LP was originally offered on a choice of transparent blue swirl and transparent red swirl (limited to 500 copies), or clear (limited to 1000 copies) vinyl color. A second pressing was done on blue and red starburst coloured vinyl (limited to 1000 copies).

By 2004, the album had sold 58,000 copies in the US.

== Promotion ==
Only three days after wrapping up Tear from the Red's recording session, Poison the Well was on the road for another tour. From November 28 to December 19, 2001, the band toured with Unearth, Sworn Enemy and Spark Lights the Friction across the South, West and Midwest United States. Poison the Well then spent five days celebrating Christmas at Trustkill Records owner Josh Grabelle's house in Tinton Falls, New Jersey. This was followed by another month-long tour, from December 26, 2001 to January 20, 2002 with Hatebreed and Sworn Enemy. The tour also welcomed God Forbid, Shadows Fall, American Nightmare, Converge, Most Precious Blood, No Warning and Throwdown on select legs of the tour. This trip took the bands across the North East of the United States, including a date at Stillborn Festival, crossing into Canada, then heading to the Midwest and Central United States. Moreira's voice began giving out during this tour, a relapse of what had occurred on The Opposite of December.. A Season of Separation's final promotional tour in September 2001, but instead of cancelling shows, Poison the Well's roadie Rick filled in on vocals.

Poison the Well were scheduled to hop on another tour, from January 22 to February 1, 2002, with The Suicide Machines and Catch 22, taking them through Florida, Louisiana and Texas. But the band pulled out in order to give Moreira's voice a chance to recover. It was then announced that bassist Dovi had left the band; he went on to play in the bands Burn Your Wishes, Bunnyhorse and Unearth. Former Last Minute and Forever and a Day guitarist Nicolas Schuhmann spent the next three months as Poison the Well's bassist. Schuhmann's first show was the Tear from the Red album release show on February 23, 2002 at the Orbit Night Club in Boynton Beach, Florida.

Poison the Well then reunited with Hatebreed for the Perseverance Tour 2002 which took the bands through the Midwest and West Coast from February 28 to March 19, 2002. They were accompanied by Bane and What Feeds the Fire on all dates and Hemlock for one of the legs; Bane, however, had to pull out towards the end of the tour when their close friend Steve Neale passed away. It was while Poison the Well was on this tour that Tear from the Red blew up in the media. The album entered Billboard's charts on March 9, 2002, reaching number 23 on the Independent Albums chart and number 36 on the Heatseekers Albums charts. Tear from the Red also entered CMJ's charts, topping the Most Added chart, reaching number 1 on the Loud Rock College chart, number 4 on the Radio 200 and Loud Rock Crucial Spin charts and number 22 on the Retail 100 chart. The band immediately began to be courted by major record labels, much to the dissatisfaction of Trustkill Records, which attempted to renew their soon-expiring contract. Nevertheless, Poison the Well ended up signing with Velvet Hammer Music and Management Group, which was operating as an independent imprint with secured financing through Atlantic Records.

From March 20 to April 21, 2002, Poison the Well toured the East Coast, Midwest and Canada accompanied by American Nightmare. The first two legs of the tour were meant to include Bane but the band was still in mourning of their friend Steve Neale and did not join them. Hopesfall was also originally booked for the third leg of the tour but had to pull out in order to record their album The Satellite Years. Instead, Eighteen Visions and Codeseven joined for the second leg of the tour, while From Autumn to Ashes and Blood Has Been Shed came in for the third leg. The tour included stops to play such festivals as MACROCK in Harrisonburg, Virginia (which Poison the Well did not play due to van troubles), the New England Metal and Hardcore Festival in Worcester, Connecticut, Start Your Lawnmower in Cleveland, Ohio and the Skate and Surf Festival in Asbury Park, New Jersey. Poison the Well then toured with Glassjaw, Recover and Vex Red from May 9–23, 2002 hitting cities in the Southern and West Coast of the United States. Upon returning from tour, bassist Schuhmann departed.

In the last week of May 2002, Poison the Well filmed a music video for their single "Botchla" with director Darren Doane. As the band had no bassist at the time, the video was shot with a four-piece band featuring only Moreira, Primack, Miller and Hornbrook. It was the first music video financed by Trustkill Records and it premiered on the record label's website on July 31, 2002. The music video for "Botchla" began airing on MTV2 in November 2002 and was later included on the Trustkill Video Assault Vol. 1 DVD, released on November 16, 2004. It also appeared on Poison the Well's DVD releases Tear from the Road, and later Fall 2003 DVD.

Poison the Well welcomed new bassist Geoffrey Bergman, formerly of Curl Up and Die, in mid-May 2002, but he did not officially take up the position until June 1, 2002 when the band embarked on a tour with Strung Out, Rise Against and Rufio The bands hit the road from June 1–29, 2002 playing in the South, East Coast, Midwest and West Coast. From July 9 to August 9, 2002, Poison the Well toured across the entire United States supporting Kittie, Shadows Fall and Killswitch Engage. Due to van troubles upon leaving Florida, however, Poison the Well missed the first two shows of the tour; Killswitch Engage also missed the first couple of dates because of their performance at Hellfest.

On August 27, 2002, Poison the Well played a surprise show at Kaffe Krystal in Miami, Florida, disguised under the name Tear from the Red on the bill. The event highlighted local Florida hardcore band Destro's final show, but also celebrated the release of Poison the Well's Tear from the Red 7" vinyl singles on Trustkill Records and the band's first DVD Tear from the Road. The DVD included a documentary and live footage of the band on their recent tours promoting Tear from the Red, along with the music video for "Botchla" and a making-of the video feature. The DVD was edited by Christopher Sims through his film production company TimeCode Entertainment, and was marketed through Trustkill Records and Velvet Hammer's promotional division Streetwise Concepts & Culture.

Poison the Well spent another month on the road, from September 23 to October 28, 2002, as part of the Plea for Peace/Take Action Tour. The band played across the entire United States alongside The Promise Ring, The International Noise Conspiracy, Thursday, Cursive, The Lawrence Arms and Common Rider. The tour package was in support of a teen suicide prevention hotline. Poison the Well also provided the song "Botchla" for the benefit Various Artists compilation Plea for Peace/Take Action, Volume 2, released through Sub City Records. After the Plea for Peace/Take Action Tour, Poison the Well ended their promotional touring in support of Tear from the Red and began writing their follow-up album, which quickly took shape as You Come Before You.

== Critical reception ==
Professional ratings
Review scores
| Source | Rating |
|---|---|
| AllMusic | 3/5 stars |
| CMJ | Positive |
| Decoy | 9.5/10 stars |
| DigitalMetal | Positive |
| Lambgoat | 8/10 stars |
| MegaKungFu | 10/10 stars |
| PA Hardcore | 4/5 stars |
| PunkNews | 2.5/5 stars |
| The Pimp Rock Palace | 4/5 stars |
| Undevoured | 4.5/5 stars |

Tear from the Red received immediate critical acclaim upon release.

== Track listing ==
Credits are adapted from the album's liner notes.

| No. | Title | Lyrics | Music | Length |
|---|---|---|---|---|
| 1. | "Botchla" | Moreira | Primack; Hornbrook; Derek Miller | 3:10 |
| 2. | "Lazzaro" | Moreira | Primack; Hornbrook; Miller | 3:00 |
| 3. | "Turn Down Elliot" | Moreira | Primack; Hornbrook; Miller | 4:00 |
| 4. | "Rings from Corona" | Moreira | Primack; Hornbrook; Miller | 2:47 |
| 5. | "Moments Over Exaggerate" | Moreira | Primack; Hornbrook; Miller | 3:15 |
| 6. | "Horns and Tails" | Moreira | Primack; Hornbrook; Miller | 2:43 |
| 7. | "Sticks and Stones Never Made Sense" | Moreira | Primack; Hornbrook; Miller | 3:35 |
| 8. | "Pieces of You in Me" | Moreira | Primack; Hornbrook; Miller | 3:10 |
| 9. | "Karsey Street" | Milius | Primack; Hornbrook; Miller | 1:07 |
| 10. | "Parks and What You Meant to Me" | Moreira | Primack; Hornbrook; Miller | 3:47 |
| Total length: | | | | 30:26 |

== Personnel ==
Credits are adapted from the album's liner notes.

Poison the Well

- Jeffrey Moreira – lead vocals
- Ryan Primack – lead guitar
- Derek Miller – rhythm guitar
- Iano Dovi – bass guitar
- Christopher Hornbrook – drums

Production

- Don Clark – art direction and design at Asterik Studio
- Jeremy Staska – recording engineer, mixer, producer and mastering engineer at Studio 13
- Poison the Well – co-producer
