= Big black delta =

Big black delta may refer to:

== In music ==
- Big Black Delta, an American rock band
  - Big Black Delta (album), a 2013 album by the band

== Other ==
- Black triangle (UFO), another name for Unidentified Flying Objects
