= Brendan Grace =

Irish comedian and singer (1951–2019)

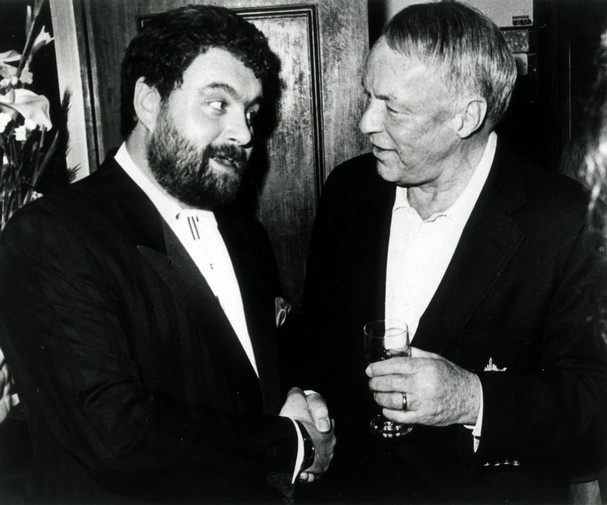
- Grace with Frank Sinatra in Dublin, 1991
- Born: 1 April 1951; Dublin, Ireland
- Died: 11 July 2019 (aged 68); Galway, Ireland
- Occupations: Comedian, singer
- Years active: 1969–2019
- Spouse: Eileen Doyle (m. 1973)
- Children: 4, including Bradley

Brendan Grace (1 April 1951 – 11 July 2019) was an Irish comedian and singer. He portrayed the comedy schoolboy character 'Bottler', appeared in the 1995 film Moondance, and played Father Fintan Stack in the Irish TV sitcom Father Ted. His 1975 song "The Combine Harvester" was a number one hit in Ireland, as well as his cover of "The Dutchman" in 1982.

== Early life ==
Born in the heart of Dublin in 1951, Grace was raised on Echlin Street, in the inner city Liberties neighbourhood. His father Seamus worked as a bartender, an ambulance man and other odd jobs to keep the family going. Like many young Dubliners of the time, Grace left school young to begin working. His first job was as a messenger boy, an occupation he often referred to in his live act.

== Music career ==
At the age of 18, Grace formed a folk group band known as the Gingermen. During a gig one night, the band found themselves two members short; in an attempt to calm an anxious crowd, Grace was thrust upon the stage to humour them. His wit and observations of daily life in Ireland won over the crowd.

Grace's hit songs included "Cushie Butterfield", "The Combine Harvester"—which topped the charts in Ireland in 1975, and in 1976 was a UK number one hit for The Wurzels—and "The Dutchman".

== Acting career ==
In 1995, Grace starred in Moondance, and the following year he appeared in the Father Ted episode "New Jack City" as Father Fintan Stack. In 2007, he appeared as Big Sean in Killinaskully, and in 2015, he starred in The Gift.

He also reprised his Bottler character in a TV movie also called Bottler in November 2013. It tells of Bottler's exploits in his early years.

== Personal life ==
Brendan Grace married Eileen Doyle in 1973. They had four children, including Bradley Grace, a member of the American metalcore band Poison the Well.

In November 2009, Grace released his autobiography, Amuzing Grace (ISBN 0956354114). In his later life, he divided his time between his home and his pub which he named Brendan Grace's Bar.

Grace was diagnosed with pneumonia in June 2019, and died from lung cancer at the Galway Clinic in Galway, Ireland, on 11 July 2019, aged 68. His funeral took place on 15 July at the Church of St. Nicholas of Myra in Dublin, followed by cremation. The funeral was attended by thousands of fans who lined the streets outside the church as well as along the procession route, which included stops outside the Guinness brewery and Grace's childhood home on Echlin Street. A year later his family scattered his ashes on Lough Derg near their family home in Killaloe, County Clare. A seat was also dedicated to the entertainer at his favourite spot in Killaloe where he used to feed the ducks and the swans.
