= Versions (Poison the Well album) =

Studio album by Poison the Well
- Released: April 3, 2007
- Recorded: May 2005 · November–December 2006
- Studio: The Octagon & Tonteknik (Umeå)
- Genre: Metalcore; post-hardcore
- Length: 41:58
- Label: Ferret
- Producer: Eskil Lövström; Pelle Henricsson

Poison the Well chronology
| You Come Before You (2003) | Versions (2007) | The Tropic Rot (2009) |

Singles from Versions
- 1. "Letter Thing" Released: March 13, 2007

Versions is the fourth studio album by the American metalcore band Poison the Well, released on April 3, 2007. Recorded with producers Eskil Lövström and Pelle Henricsson in Umeå, Sweden, work on the album commenced in May 2005, whilst Poison the Well were still under contract with Atlantic Records. In 2006, the band parted ways with Atlantic over creative differences and signed to Ferret Music, after which they completed the rest of the album in November and December that year. Vocalist Jeffrey Moreira, guitarist Ryan Primack and drummer Chris Hornbrook were the sole constant members of Poison the Well during the recording of Versions; guitarist Jason Boyer was present for initial sessions and worked on five songs, but left prior to its completion in 2006.

Versions is a metalcore and post-hardcore album that incorporates elements from country music and a wide variety of instrumentation. Music critics praised the album's songwriting and ambition, though some felt mixed towards its experimentation. Preceded by the digital-only single "Letter Thing", released in March 2007, Versions debuted at number 147 on the US Billboard 200 chart with first week sales of 7,700 copies. Poison the Well promoted the album with headlining and supporting tours of North America and Europe, and performances on the 2007 Warped Tour.

== Background and recording ==
In 2003, Poison the Well released its third album, You Come Before You, through Atlantic Records. The album was well-received, but was a commercial failure, selling only 115,500 copies in the United States by 2007. After lengthy tours in support of the album, Poison the Well began pre-production on a new album. In September 2004, longtime guitarist Derek Miller left Poison the Well, stating that his "heart was no longer in" the band; his departure led them to scrap a planned album they had written with him, consisting of eleven or twelve songs. The band recruited Jason Boyer as his replacement, along with new bassist Ben Brown. The band began writing Versions in January 2005; "Riverside" was the first song written for the album. They also recorded seven demoes at The Steakhouse around this time. According to drummer Chris Hornbrook, guitarist Ryan Primack and Boyer wrote riffs which the band developed into full songs; he noted that Boyer contributed to writing five of the songs.

Poison the Well recorded Versions over the course of two recording sessions with producers Eskil Lövström and Pelle Henricsson at Tonteknik Recording in Umeå, Sweden. The album's basic tracks were recorded at The Octagon. The first recording session, in May 2005, produced twelve songs. Thereafter, the band embarked on the Sounds Of The Underground of the United States. Experiencing personal and artistic burnout, with Primack still dealing with his father's death in February 2005, Poison the Well delayed plans to resume recording Versions to early 2006 so they could write more material. Towards the end of writing, the band sent their demos to Atlantic. Primack said that although the label's European division supported Poison the Well, Atlantic's US division wanted the band to write accessible material. As they had signed to the label under the condition they would have complete creative control, Poison the Well decided to leave Atlantic. It took the band six months to get out of their contract, and they announced their split from the label on June 13, 2006.

Vocalist Jefferey Moriera said that Poison the Well broke up for a week around the time of their departure from Atlantic before deciding they wanted to continue. Shortly thereafter, the band were contacted by Ferret Music, whose personnel they had known for several years; they signed to the label four months later. In the interim period, Boyer and Brown both left Poison the Well. In November 2006, Moriera, Primack, and Hornbrook returned to Umeå, where they recorded eight new songs for Versions and re-recorded most of their material from the first recording session. Recording was completed in December 2006, with mixing and mastered being finished shortly thereafter. Poison the Well had twenty songs to consider for the album's twelve-song tracklist, and struggled to come to an collective agreement. The outtakes were later released as a trilogy of extended plays, I/III / II/III / III/III, between November 2008 and May 2009.

== Composition ==
Versions has been described as metalcore, post-hardcore, and "progressive hardcore". According to Eduardo Rivadiva of AllMusic, the album combines moderate "bursts of pure hardcore with unpredictable detours into densely textured guitar dirges". Music journalists highlighted the album's incorporation of influences from country music, and wide variety of instrumentation including mandolins, slide guitar, horns and banjo, performed mostly by Primack. Lövström and Henricsson also contributed to the instrumentation. Moriera's vocals alternate between singing, crooning and screaming. Primack said that Versions has no concept and was intended to reflect the lives of Poison the Well's members; he believed the album was darker than the band's previous releases as a result of Derek Miller's departure. Moriera did not want to disclose the meaning of his lyrics on the album so listeners could come up with their own interpretations, which he believed would make them more personal and important. The album's title, coined by Moriera, was intended to reflect the changes in Poison the Well's lineup, management, and labels.

The opening track of Versions, "Letter Thing" features intense drumming, aggressive vocals and guitarwork, banjos, and slide guitar. "Breathing's for the Birds" is a mid-tempo track featuring dynamic vocals and a rolling tom drum pattern. Jackie Smit of Chronicles of Chaos compared the song to the Deftones. "Nagaina" was named after a cobra in the Ruyard Kipling story Rikki-Tikki-Tavi (1894). Musically, the song features a "swooping" bassline, classic and progressive rock-styled riffs, and clean singing. Stephen Hill of Metal Hammer called it a "slow, stalking menace". Waleed Rashidi of Modern Drummer cited "The Notches that Create Your Headboard" as an example of moments where "brawn defeats beauty" on Versions. "Pleading Post" incorporates banjos, mandolins, and various horns, whilst "Slow Good Morning" showcases various instruments across its running time and slowly culminates in what AbsolutePunk's Drew Beringer described as a "crushing finish". Kirk Miller of Decibel remarked that the latter song was "positively jaunty and pop-like for a song about dead bodies".

"Prematurio el Baby" layers organs over disorganized guitarwork, and was likened to a garage rock-influenced At the Drive-In by Miller. Brian Shultz of Punknews.org likened "Composer Meets Corpse" to a heavily distorted Snapcase. "You Will Not Be Welcomed" opens with moody keyboards and guitars and showcases Moriera's falsetto and screamed vocals, and its "emotive crescendo" was highlighted by Smit. "Naive Monarch" is an uptempo and melodic track displaying polyrhythmic dissonance, whilst the country rock song "Riverside" pays homage to Spaghetti Westerns and recalls the work of Ennio Morricone. Beringer described Versions' closing track, "The First Day of My Second Life", as combining of all of the ideas presented throughout the album.

== Release and promotion ==
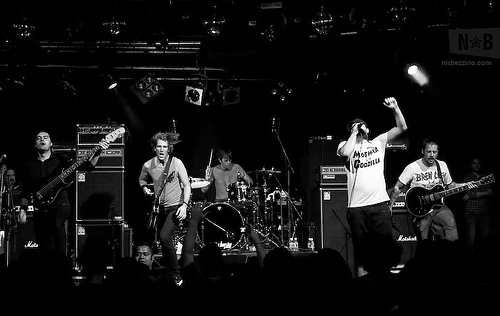
Poison the Well performing in Europe in 2008

On January 22, 2007, Poison the Well unveiled the track listing for Versions. After initially being uploaded to the band's Myspace page on February 20, "Letter Thing" was released as the lead single from the album, exclusively on digital storefronts, on March 13, 2007. The album was released on April 3, 2007, and sold 7,700 copies in its first week to debut at number 147 on the US Billboard 200 chart. According to Hill, the album was "mostly ignored" upon release due to the four-year gap between Poison the Well's albums, between which time he said metalcore had both peaked and declined commercially.

With guitarist Brad Clifford and bassist Mike MacIvor filling in as touring members, Poison the Well embarked on headlining tours of the southeastern United States and the United Kingdom in February and March 2007; the band were supported by The End and This is Hell on the former. From April 3 to May 12, 2007, Poison the Well embarked on a headlining tour of the United States supported by Heavy Heavy Low Low, Fear Before the March of Flames, The End and Portugal. the Man. On May 17, a music video for "Letter Thing", directed by Roboshobo, was released. After touring with Saosin and The Receiving End of Sirens in late June, Poison the Well joined the Warped Tour from July to August 25, 2007. In September, they toured the United Kingdom again, with Gallows and Lethal Bizzle.

In January and February 2008, Poison the Well toured the United States with Dance Gavin Dance; The Chariot, The Locust, and Crime in Stereo supported both bands on select dates. Poison the Well then returned to Europe for a tour with The Dillinger Escape Plan and Stolen Babies between February 26 and March 30. From May 10–29, 2008, Poison the Well and Throwdown supported Killswitch Engage on a two-week tour of the Midwestern United States and Canada, followed immediately thereafter by a headlining tour from May 30 until June 12.

== Critical reception ==
Professional ratings
Review scores
| Source | Rating |
|---|---|
| AbsolutePunk | 82% |
| AllMusic | 3.5/5 stars |
| Alternative Press | 4.5/5 |
| Chronicles of Chaos | 8/10 |
| Metal.de | 8/10 |
| Ox-Fanzine | 10/10 |
| Punknews.org | 4/5 stars |
| Rock Hard | 8/10 |
| Spin | 4/5 stars |

Sebastian Wahle of Ox-Fanzine hailed Versions as a creative breakthrough for Poison the Well and praised the band for making music for themselves instead of their fanbase. Rivadiva of AllMusic expected the album to be controversially received by fans, but nevertheless found it a "typically progressive" and "daring" release from the band. Metal.de's Norman Sickinger called it "a work of modern metal that's as raw as it is profound". Spin's Aaron Burgess viewed Versions as "the album of [Poison the Well's] career", stating that their songs "have never been so multilayered, or their focus so staggeringly intense." Ronen Kaufman of Alternative Press felt that Poison the Well were able to skilfully combine "fast and forceful indignation bound to an uncommonly natural gift for the unhappily mellow" whilst lauding Lövström and Henricsson's production as the best of Ferret Music's releases. Punknews.org's Shultz said that whilst operating in their "standard, heavy groove", Poison the Well sounded "worlds more intense, honest, and convicted" than they had on their previous releases, whilst likening the album's presentation to the discography of Hydra Head Records and Cave In. Exclaim!'s Max Deneau considered its songwriting to be Poison the Well's strongest since their debut album The Opposite of December...A Season of Separation (1999); he felt Moriera's vocal range was limited, though also that he had "[grown] and matured in many ways as a vocalist".

Chris Harris of MTV News felt that Poison the Well had "effectively launch[ed] a new sound" and were "surprisingly successful" in their attempts to combine heavy metal with country on Versions. Patrick Schmidt of Rock Hard felt that the unusual instrumentation featured on the album helped "intensify" the arrangements, and that Poison the Well's "completely unique understanding of melody" distinguished them from "many imitators" and made its ballads feel "artful rather than kitschy". Beringer of AbsolutePunk praised Poison the Well's attention to detail with its songwriting, though he found some songs too similar and criticized its slow mid-section with the tracks "Pleading Post" and "Slow Good Morning". Miller of Decibel found the experimentation of tracks like "Riverside" confusing, but was nevertheless content that Poison the Well's aggressive sound remained intact. Smit of Chronicles of Chaos felt the album's instrumental experimentation faltered at points, such as on "Slow Good Morning", but highlighted its moments of "noir atmosphere". He further praised Poison the Well's take on post-hardcore, which he compared favorably to Fugazi's sixth album The Argument (2001).

== Track listing ==
| No. | Title | Length |
|---|---|---|
| 1. | "Letter Thing" | 2:28 |
| 2. | "Breathing's for the Birds" | 3:41 |
| 3. | "Nagaina" | 4:10 |
| 4. | "The Notches that Create Your Headboard" | 2:30 |
| 5. | "Pleading Post" | 3:36 |
| 6. | "Slow Good Morning" | 5:05 |
| 7. | "Prematurio el Baby" | 2:53 |
| 8. | "Composer Meets Corpse" | 2:30 |
| 9. | "You Will Not Be Welcomed" | 4:46 |
| 10. | "Naive Monarch" | 2:24 |
| 11. | "Riverside" | 3:02 |
| 12. | "The First Day of My Second Life" | 4:53 |
| Total length: | | 41:58 |

European and vinyl bonus track
| No. | Title | Length |
|---|---|---|
| 13. | "Wreck Itself Taking You With Me" | 3:21 |

Japanese bonus track
| No. | Title | Length |
|---|---|---|
| 13. | "Oceanbreast" | 4:17 |

== Personnel ==
Personnel per liner notes.

Poison the Well
- Jeffrey Moreira - vocals
- Ryan Primack - guitar, bass, mandolin, banjo, synthesizer, wurlitzer piano and backing vocals
- Chris Hornbrook - drums, percussion

Additional personnel

- Jason Boyer - guitar (4, 6, 9, 11, 12)
- Pelle Henricsson - percussion, synthesizer, wurlitzer piano, second snare drum, noise
- Eskil Lövström - muu guitar, trumpet, and trombone (5, 8, 11)
Production
- Pelle Henricsson - production, recording, mixing, mastering
- Eskil Lövström - production, recording, mixing

Artwork

- Brian Montuori - cover art, paintings
- Dimitri Minakakis - layout, art direction

== Charts ==
Chart performance for Versions
| Chart (2007) | Peak position |
|---|---|
| US Billboard 200 | 147 |
| US Top Independent Albums (Billboard) | 8 |
