= Peace in Place =

Studio album by Poison the Well
- Released: March 20, 2026
- Recorded: 2024–2025
- Genre: Metalcore
- Length: 42:20
- Label: SharpTone
- Producer: Will Putney

Poison the Well chronology
The Tropic Rot (2009)	Peace in Place (2026)

Singles from Peace in Place
- 1. "Weeping Tones" Released: March 20, 2026

Professional ratings
Review scores
Source	Rating
Blabbermouth.net	7/10
Boolin Tunes	8/10
Distorted Sound	9/10
Ghost Cult Magazine	8/10
Kerrang!	4/5
Wall of Sound	9.5/10

Peace in Place is the sixth studio album by American metalcore band Poison the Well. Their first album in 17 years, it was released on March 20, 2026 through SharpTone Records. A music video for the song "Weeping Tones" was released on the same day as the album.

== Track listing ==
All tracks are written by Chris Hornbrook, Jeffrey Moreira, and Ryan Primack, with additional writing on "Weeping Tones" by Derek Miller.

1. "Wax Mask" – 3:36
2. "Primal Bloom" – 3:38
3. "Thoroughbreds" – 3:22
4. "Everything Hurts" – 4:05
5. "Weeping Tones" – 3:00
6. "A Wake of Vultures" – 4:02
7. "Bad Bodies" – 3:30
8. "Drifting Without End" – 4:09
9. "Melted" – 3:13
10. "Plague Them the Most" – 9:45

=== Note ===
- "Plague Them the Most" ends at 3:10, followed by silence until 6:00 and a hidden track, titled "Mercedes" according to liner notes.

== Personnel ==
Credits adapted from the album's liner notes.

=== Poison the Well ===
- Jeffrey Moreira – vocals
- Ryan Primack – guitars, bass, keyboards
- Chris Hornbrook – drums

=== Additional contributors ===
- Will Putney – production, engineering, mixing, mastering, additional bass guitar on "Weeping Tones"
- Steve Seid – editing, additional engineering, additional guitar on "Plague Them the Most"
- Frank Maddocks – design

== Charts ==
Chart performance for Peace in Place
Chart (2026)	Peak position
UK Rock & Metal Albums (Official Charts)	33
UK Independent Albums Breakers (OCC)	18
US Top Album Sales (Billboard)	32
