= Poison the Well (band) =

American metalcore band

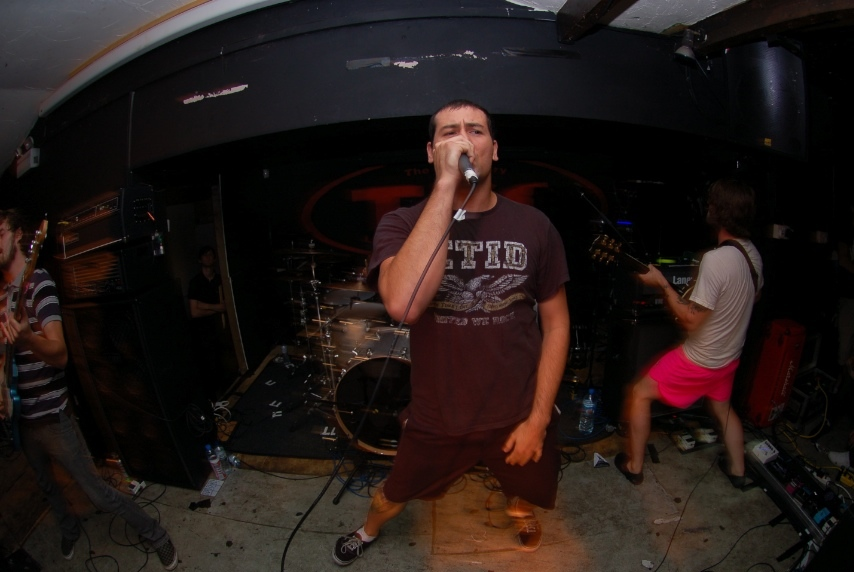
- Jeffery Moreira, England, 2007

Background information
- Also known as: Doubting Thomas, An Acre Lost
- Origin: Coral Springs, Florida, U.S.
- Genres: Metalcore; post-hardcore; hardcore punk
- Years active: 1997–2010; 2015; 2016; 2020–present
- Labels: Good Life; Trustkill; Atlantic; Ferret; SharpTone
- Members: Ryan Primack; Chris Hornbrook; Jeffrey Moreira; Vadim Taver; Noah Harmon
- Past members: See Members

Poison the Well is an American metalcore band from Miami, Florida, that was originally active between 1997 and 2010. Lead guitarist Ryan Primack and drummer Chris Hornbrook are the only remaining founding members (though both left for various stints in the late 1990s), with long-serving vocalist Jeffrey Moreira being featured on all six of their studio albums. The band reformed for numerous shows in 2015, and again in both 2016 and 2020; the latter became a permanent reunion that lead to the release of their first studio album in 17 years, Peace in Place, in 2026. Their albums have sold a combined total of over 300,000 copies in the United States as of 2012.

== History ==
=== Formation: Doubting Thomas to An Acre Lost (1997–1998) ===
Poison the Well was originally formed under the name Doubting Thomas by lead vocalist Aryeh Lehrer and lead guitarist Ryan Primack in the autumn of 1997. Lehrer was responsible for coining the name Doubting Thomas. The band was originally based in Coral Springs, Florida, where the two attended J. P. Taravella High School, but later moved to a rehearsal space in Miami, Florida. Lehrer, who had previously played in the band Reaching Out, recruited rhythm guitarist Russel Saunders, formerly of the band Side Order, and bassist Shane Halpern who had recently moved from North Carolina down to Florida.

In December 1997, Doubting Thomas was renamed An Acre Lost, a name Saunders' girlfriend came up with.

=== The Opposite of December... A Season of Separation (1999–2001) ===
From October 2–10, 1999, Poison the Well recorded their first full-length album, The Opposite of December... A Season of Separation, with producer Jeremy Staska at Studio 13. The band invited former vocalists Hosein and Lehrer to provide backing vocals on the song "Not Within Arms Length", the lyrics of which had been written by Hosein before he left the band in 1998.

Bassist Landsman was kicked out of the band in late September 2000 due to ongoing personal differences. Landsman had been the vocalist in the Florida metalcore band Until the End and would later front the band Target Nevada with several ex-Poison the Well members. Nevertheless, Landsman agreed to honour Poison the Well's already-booked upcoming show on October 6, 2000, at Club Q in Davie, Florida. The show was a landmark event, not only as Landsman's final show with Poison the Well, but because it also celebrated the release of Until the End's debut extended play, already released on September 12, 2000, through Equal Vision Records. Despite rumors that he walking off stage mid-way through their show, Landsman finished Poison the Well's set and went on to perform with Until the End later that evening. However, Hornbrook was later asked to leave Until the End at Landsman's insistence.

Michael Gordillo was immediately announced as Landsman's replacement. Gordillo's first show with Poison the Well was on October 20, 2000, at the Downtime in Manhattan, New York.

Poison the Well continued touring for most of 2001 in promotion of The Opposite of December... A Season of Separation. They performed at the Board Festival in Boston, Massachusetts, Hellfest in East Syracuse, New York, Monster Fest in Burlington, Vermont, and Krazy Fest 4 in Louisville, Kentucky.

In February 2001, Gordillo departed; a month later he was replaced by California-based bassist Javier Van Huss, formerly of the bands Enewetak, Eighteen Visions, Throwdown, Breakneck, Bleeding Through and Wrench. From mid-March to mid-April 2001, Poison the Well toured with Candiria, Origin and Cryptopsy.

Bassist Iano Dovi, formerly of the band Pintsize, joined in August 2001, just in time for a two-week tour with Unearth, God Forbid and Martyr AD across Canada, the Northeast and the Midwest.

=== Unreleased splits and Distance Makes the Heart Grow Fonder reissue (2000–2002) ===
In August 2000, Poison the Well announced that a split 7-inch vinyl was in development for release through a one-off deal with Pennsylvania-based record label Surprise Attack Records and Georgia-based record label Jawk Records. The band sharing the split was originally meant to be their touring mates Twelve Tribes and Poison the Well recorded two exclusive songs in early October 2000: "Sticks and Stones Never Made Sense" and a cover of The Smashing Pumpkins' "Today". These were the band's first recordings played in Drop C tuning and to feature their new bassist Mike Gordillo. By November 2000, the split, which had been scheduled for release in December 2000, had been pushed back to late January to early February 2001 and Twelve Tribes was replaced by Florida-based band A New Kind of American Saint. Poison the Well had been touring with A New Kind of American Saint's guitarist Michael Peters the month prior.

The second release with Undecided Records was to be another split 7-inch, this one with Eighteen Visions. The split for Undecided Records was to feature a Metallica cover from each of the bands as part of the record label's Crush 'Em All series, which had already seen a split by Shai Hulud and BoySetsFire released as Volume 1 in March 2000. The series was also planning other splits for Indecision and Walls of Jericho (Volume 2), Today Is the Day and Supermachiner (Volume 4) and Disembodied (Volume 5); Poison the Well and Eighteen Visions were to be the third release in the series with a tentative release date for the summer of 2001. In January 2001, the Crush 'Em All series switched from 7-inch vinyl to compact discs. Poison the Well planned to record a cover of Metallica's "...And Justice for All", but due to complications with Trustkill Records, were unable to record it and their split with Eighteen Visions was shelved.

Poison the Well's split for Surprise Attack Records and Jawk Records was also going through delays. Although both Poison the Well and A New Kind of American Saint had recorded their songs, Trustkill Records was unhappy that Poison the Well would be releasing new and original material on another record label. Trustkill Records originally wanted both songs, "Sticks and Stones Never Made Sense" and their cover of The Smashing Pumpkins' "Today", to appear on their forthcoming sophomore full-length (which later took shape as Tear from the Red). On February 11, 2001, it was announced that an agreement had been struck with Trustkill Records but that it could not be released until after Poison the Well's new album was out (i.e. not until later in 2002), leading A New Kind of American Saint to drop off the project.

Only week later, on February 18, 2001, it was reported that Throwdown, which featured members of Eighteen Visions, would replace A New Kind of American Saint on the split 7-inch vinyl. Throwdown immediately planned to enter the studio to record two new songs: "False Idols" and a cover of Weezer's "Say It Ain't So". But Throwdown's recording session was pushed back by several months due to their touring schedule. In March 2001, Surprise Attack Records used the recording of "Sticks and Stones Never Made Sense" on their Various Artists sampler Budget Sampler: It's All About the Money, co-released with Canadian record labels Goodfellow Records and Redstar Records. Poison the Well then performed their cover of "Today" at Hellfest 2001 on Friday, July 6, 2001, at Liquids in East Syracuse, New York. Throwdown finally entered the studio to record their side of the split in mid-August 2001; by this time, their choice cover had changed to Deftones' "Around the Fur".

"Sticks and Stones Never Made Sense" was eventually re-recorded for Poison the Well's sophomore full-length Tear from the Red in October–November 2001. Throwdown's original song "False Idols" was also later re-recorded for their full-length album Haymaker. Jawk Records announced that the artwork for the split was designed in October 2001, and in January 2002 the test presses of the 7-inch vinyl had been received. Nevertheless, the release was ultimately shelved. The original recording of "Sticks and Stones Never Made Sense" was later used as a bonus track on the Japanese version of You Come Before You, released by Warner Music Japan on October 29, 2003, and appeared on the b-side to the 10-inch vinyl single for "Ghostchant" (both listed it as "Sticks and Stones Never Made Sense (Demo)". The band later posted it on their Myspace page on October 10, 2006. Poison the Well's cover of "Today" was never released; the band later recorded another The Smashing Pumpkins cover, "Soma" for the ReIgnition Recordings Various Artists compilation The Killer in You: A Tribute to Smashing Pumpkins.

=== Tear from the Red (2001–2002) ===
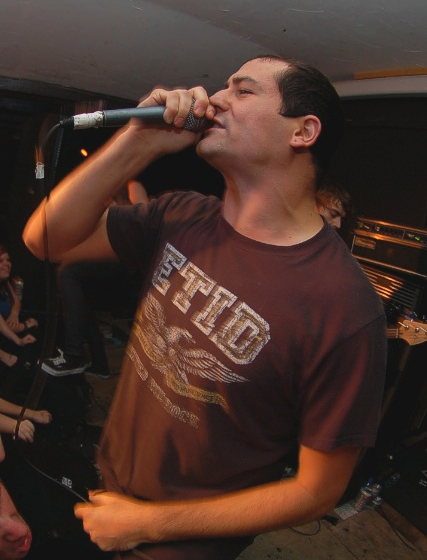
Jeffrey Moreira live in 2007

Poison the Well had originally planned to record their sophomore album in April 2001, after returning from a booked Asian tour, with a scheduled release date of August 1, 2001. At that time, the release was to be made up of eleven original songs and a cover song. The cover song was quickly dropped and the band announced that they would instead track twelve original songs. Once the Asian tour was cancelled, the band took the opportunity to spend more time writing the album and opted to tour North America during the spring and summer of 2001. Tear from the Red was written over a period of one year, from the summer of 2000 to the summer of 2001, during which time the band played with five different bassist. Landsman, Gordillo, Van Huss, Albert and Dovi each contributed to the songwriting and arrangements.

Jacob Bannon was originally consulted to design the artwork for Tear from the Red but the band instead hired Demon Hunter bassist Don Clark at Asterik Studio. The compact disc edition booklet was designed to include a semi-transparent parchment paper after every page. Poison the Well planned to release Tear from the Red on Valentine's Day, February 14, 2002. However, the date fell on a Thursday and Trustkill Records was forced to work with music industry standards of releasing new music on Tuesdays. The date was therefore set for the first Tuesday after Valentine's Day, February 19, 2002. Trustkill Records began accepting pre-orders on February 8, 2002, and any orders placed prior to the release date included a free 18" by 24" poster.

Poison the Well then reunited with Hatebreed for the Perseverance Tour 2002 which took the bands through the Midwest and West Coast from February 28 to March 19, 2002. They were accompanied by Bane and What Feeds the Fire on all dates and Hemlock for one of the legs; Bane, however, had to pull out towards the end of the tour when their close friend Steve Neale passed away. It was while Poison the Well was on this tour that Tear from the Red blew up in the media. The album entered Billboard's charts on March 9, 2002, reaching number 23 on the Independent Albums chart and number 36 on the Heatseekers Albums charts. Tear from the Red also entered CMJ's charts, topping the Most Added chart, reaching number 1 on the Loud Rock College chart, number 4 on the Radio 200 and Loud Rock Crucial Spin charts and number 22 on the Retail 100 chart. The band immediately began to be courted by major record labels, much to the dissatisfaction of Trustkill Records, who attempted to renew their soon-expiring contract. Nevertheless, Poison the Well ended up signing with Velvet Hammer Music and Management Group, which was operating as an independent imprint with secured financing through Atlantic Records.

Poison the Well welcomed new bassist Geoffrey Bergman, formerly of Curl Up and Die, in mid-May 2002, but he did not officially take up the position until June 1, 2002, when the band embarked on a tour with Strung Out, Rise Against and Rufio The bands hit the road from June 1–29, 2002, playing in the South, East Coast, Midwest and West Coast. From July 9 to August 9, 2002, Poison the Well toured across the entire United States supporting Kittie, Shadows Fall and Killswitch Engage. Due to van troubles upon leaving Florida, however, Poison the Well missed the first two shows of the tour; Killswitch Engage also missed the first couple of dates because of their performance at Hellfest.

On August 27, 2002, Poison the Well played a surprise show at Kaffe Krystal in Miami, Florida, disguised under the name Tear from the Red on the bill. The event highlighting local Florida hardcore band Destro's final show, but also celebrated the release of Poison the Well's Tear from the Red 7-inch vinyl singles on Trustkill Records and the band's first DVD Tear from the Road. The DVD included a documentary and live footage of the band on their recent tours promoting Tear from the Red, along with the music video for "Botchla" and a making-of the video feature. The DVD was edited by Christopher Sims through his film production company TimeCode Entertainment, and was marketed through Trustkill Records and Velvet Hammer's promotional division Streetwise Concepts & Culture.

=== You Come Before You and abandoned album (2002–2005) ===
The success of Tear from the Red and their continuous touring schedule helped Poison The Well gain the attention of some major labels, which had started to take interest in bands coming from the hardcore scene. The band signed with Atlantic Records in 2002 and started writing for their third studio album, You Come Before You.

Poison the Well wanted to continue the evolution of their sound and felt that they needed a team of people who understood where they were going and what they wanted to do. They recorded with Swedish producers Pelle Henricsson and Eskil Lövström. Both had worked on many influential mid to late nineties Swedish hardcore records, including Refused's Songs to Fan the Flames of Discontent and The Shape of Punk to Come. The band first recorded in Van Nuys, California, at Sound City Studios and completed the rest at Tonteknik Recording AB in Umeå, Sweden. After the record was complete, the band started a year and a half tour cycle that took them to Japan, Australia, New Zealand, and Europe. Towards the end, many of the band members were worn out and unsure if they wanted to continue with Poison the Well.

Having experienced some level of success with their previous record, You Come Before You, a long and hard touring cycle left certain members of the band disenchanted. In the summer of 2004, guitarist Derek Miller quit the band. Miller had been in Poison the Well for all three prior releases and was a major part of the writing process. Poison The Well had been in the middle of pre-production for an entire record's worth of material when Miller announced his departure.

On December 10, 2004, it was announced that Poison the Well would be covering a The Smashing Pumpkins song for the ReIgnition Recordings Various Artists tribute compilation The Killer in You: A Tribute to Smashing Pumpkins. Although Poison the Well had previously recorded a cover of "Today" in October 2000, which remained unreleased, they instead chose to re-enter a studio and record a new cover of "Soma". The Killer in You: A Tribute to Smashing Pumpkins was eventually released digitally on November 15, 2005, and on compact disc three months later on January 31, 2006.

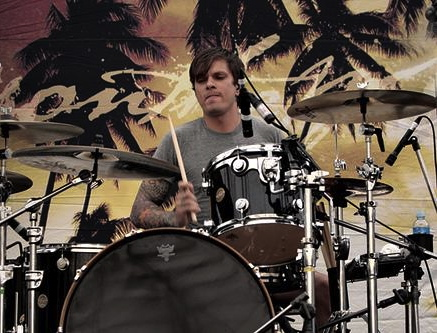
Chris Hornbrook performs at Australia's Soundwave festival 2009

=== Versions (2005–2008) ===
Poison the Well eventually regrouped, added guitarist Jason Boyer to replace Miller, and started working on new musical ideas that would be the early stages of their fourth studio album, Versions. After months of working and writing material, the band set off in early 2005 to work and record with Pelle Henricsson and Eskil Lövström at Tonteknik Studios in Umeå, Sweden. After completing the first two recording sessions and returning home, Poison the Well announced that they were parting ways with Atlantic Records after only one album because of "creative differences". Atlantic Records had given full creative control with the writing and recording of You Come Before You, not interfering and allowing the band to do what they pleased. But, after not seeing eye to eye on the direction Poison The Well had decided to move, Atlantic agreed to let the band go.

Even though the band had no label, they returned to writing material for the third and final session. The band had been in contact with Ferret Music president Carl Severson about signing with the label. Severson had been friends and a fan of the band for many years and expressed interest in signing them. After signing at the end of 2006, the band left once again for Sweden to finish up the record. Versions was released on Ferret Music on April 2, 2007, in Europe and April 3, 2007, worldwide. On February 22, 2007, they began touring in support of the album. The band also brought on Brad Clifford of Since by Man on guitar and their former guitar tech Bradley Grace on bass towards the end of this tour cycle. On March 29, 2007, Undecided Records released Distance Makes the Heart Grow Fonder digitally.

=== The Tropic Rot (2008–2009) ===
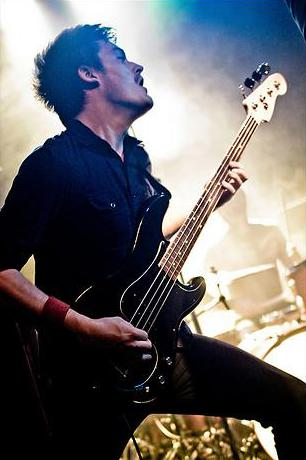
Bradley Grace, Australia, 2009

The writing process for The Tropic Rot started a few weeks after Poison the Well finished up the touring cycle for Versions. The band wanted to make a record that was more focused musically and bigger sonically. Poison the Well wrote the entire record in four and a half months in a condemned and purportedly haunted bar, the remnants of Ray's Downtown Blues which is now Longboards, in West Palm Beach, Florida. The Tropic Rot had originally been slated to be made with producer J. Robbins, but had to be cancelled due to a serious family emergency.

Steve Evetts was picked among other potential producers the band thought could capture the record the way they wanted it and could start as soon as possible. The record was recorded at Castle Oaks Production and The Candy Shop studios and was released on July 7, 2009, through Ferret Music. The album charted at No. 180 in its first week of release on the Billboard 200.

While on the first stop of their September 2009 tour with Billy Talent, Poison The Well was robbed at a tour stop in Detroit. As the band was asleep in their hotel, thieves drove off with their van and trailer containing all of their musical gear, band merchandise, and a majority of their personal possessions and clothes. After taking a few days off to get a new van and obtain some temporary gear, the band quickly produced and began selling T-shirts to raise money and buy new equipment, with the shirts containing a detailed description of all musical gear stolen including guitar and amplifier serial numbers.

=== Hiatus, external projects and reissues (2010–2012) ===
On July 14, 2010, after eight months of inactivity, Poison the Well released a press statement announcing a hiatus to "explore other interests". Since then, drummer Chris Hornbrook undertook session work as well as drumming for Los Angeles–based electronic dance music band Big Black Delta, New Jersey post-hardcore band, Senses Fail and for the solo project of Dillinger Escape Plan vocalist Greg Puciato. Ryan Primack remained involved with music, working with his former bandmate Derek Miller's band Sleigh Bells as both their production manager and second live guitar player.

=== Reunion shows (2015–2023) ===
In May 2015, Poison the Well reformed for two reunion shows: a warm-up headlining show on May 15 at the Music Hall of Williamsburg in Brooklyn, New York, and a performance at the Skate and Surf festival on May 17 in Asbury Park, New Jersey. Beginning with these shows, the band performed with Primack on lead guitar, Hornbrook on drums, Moreira on vocals and Grace on bass; the same core members that had participated in the band prior to their hiatus, with the exception of rhythm guitarist Clifford. The 2015 shows featured rhythm guitar player Ariel Arro, formerly of the Florida hardcore band Glasseater.

In 2016, Poison the Well regrouped for a total of eleven shows, performed between June and August.

Poison the Well was scheduled to perform at the Psycho Las Vegas festival in Las Vegas, Nevada in August 2020 and at Furnace Fest in Birmingham, Alabama in September 2020, but due to the COVID-19 pandemic, both events were postponed. The band was quickly rescheduled to appear at the 2021 edition of Psycho Las Vegas, due to take place between August 20–22, 2021, and at the 2021 edition of Furnace Fest, due to take place between September 24–26, 2021.

=== Peace in Place (2024–present) ===
In August 2024, Poison the Well announced in a note included in a recently released vinyl box set of all their albums that they had begun working on their first studio album in fifteen years. They released the first single from it, "Trembling Level", in January 2025.

On January 12, 2026, it was announced that Poison the Well's first studio album in seventeen years, Peace in Place, would be released on March 20.

== Musical style ==
Poison the Well is a metalcore band. Ryan Downy of AllMusic compared their sound to Slayer and Hatebreed, and said they "also balanc[ed] the proceedings with doses of warmth and melody". He further described the sound as "restless", characterized by the use of dynamics. Music critic Jim DeRogatis described the band's sound as "light and dark [and] heavy but melodic", as well as "a dramatic study in contrasts".

Poison the Well's earliest influences were Cave In, Converge, Deftones, Refused, the Smiths, Smashing Pumpkins, Nirvana, Soundgarden, Bad Brains, Leeway, Black Sabbath and the Beatles. On Versions (2007), their main influences were Dr. Rockso, John Coltrane and Jojo Mayer. On The Tropic Rot (2009), they embraced the influence of surf music, including Trini Lopez, Hank Marvin, the Ventures, Duane Eddy, Man or Astro-man?, Los Straitjackets and the Cosmonauts.

== Members ==
Current lineup

- Ryan Primack – lead guitar (1997–1999, 1999, 1999–2010, 2015, 2016, 2020–present), keyboards, piano (2006–2010)
- Chris Hornbrook – drums (1997, 1998–2010, 2015, 2016, 2020–present)
- Jeffrey Moreira – lead vocals (1998–2010, 2015, 2016, 2020–present)
- Vadim Taver – rhythm guitar (2016, 2020–present)
- Noah Harmon – bass (2024–present)

Former members and touring musicians

- Aryeh Lehrer – lead vocals (1997–1999)
- Russel Saunders – rhythm guitar (1997–1998)
- Derek Chamorro – lead vocals (1997)
- Duane Hosein – lead vocals (1998)
- Alan Landsman – lead vocals (1998), bass (1998–2000)
- Dennis Pase – drums (1997–1998)
- Shane Halpern – bass (1997), lead vocals (1997–1998)
- Andrew Abramowitz – bass (1997–1998), rhythm guitar (1998)
- Jeronimo Gomez – bass (1998)
- Derek Miller – rhythm guitar (1998–2000, 2000, 2000–2004, 2015)
- Stephen Looker – lead guitar (1999)
- José Martinez – lead guitar (1999–2000)
- Matthew Tackett – rhythm guitar (2000)
- Michael Peters – rhythm guitar (2000)
- Michael Gordillo – bass (2000–2001)
- Javier Van Huss – bass (2001)
- Albert Dovi – bass (2001)
- Iano Dovi – bass (2001–2002)
- Nicolas Schuhmann – bass (2002)
- Geoffrey Bergman – bass (2002–2004)
- Benjamin Brown – bass (2004–2006)
- Jason Boyer – rhythm guitar (2004–2006)
- Michael MacIvor – bass (2006–2007)
- Thomas Cavanaugh – bass (2007)
- Bradley Clifford – rhythm guitar (2006–2010)
- Bradley Grace – bass (2006—2010, 2015, 2016, 2020–2023)
- Ariel Arro – rhythm guitar (2015)
- Peter Allen – rhythm guitar (2016)
- James Johnson – bass (2023–2024)

== Discography ==
=== Studio albums ===
List of studio albums, with selected chart positions
Title	Album details	Peak chart positions		
Title	Album details	US	US Ind.	UK
The Opposite of December... A Season of Separation	Released: December 14, 1999; Label: Trustkill; Formats: CD, LP, digital download	—	—	—
Tear from the Red	Released: February 19, 2002; Label: Trustkill; Formats: CD, LP, digital download	—	23	—
You Come Before You	Released: July 1, 2003; Label: Atlantic; Formats: CD, LP, digital download	98	—	160
Versions	Released: April 2, 2007; Label: Ferret; Formats: CD, LP, digital download	147	8	—
The Tropic Rot	Released: July 7, 2009; Label: Ferret; Formats: CD, LP, digital download	180	30	—
Peace in Place	Released: March 20, 2026; Label: SharpTone; Formats: CD, LP, digital download	—	—	—
"—" denotes a recording that did not chart or was not released in that territory.

=== Extended plays ===
List of extended plays
Title	EP details
Distance Only Makes the Heart Grow Fonder	Released: September 1998; Label: Good Life; Formats: CD, 10-inch
I/III / II/III / III/III	Released: April 18, 2009; Label: Ferret; Formats: 7-inch

=== Singles ===
List of singles, with selected chart positions, showing year released and album name
Title	Year	Peak chart positions	Album
Title	Year	UK	Album
"Ghostchant" / "Zombies Are Good for Your Health"^{[A]}	2003	103	You Come Before You
"The Realist" / "Apathy Is a Cold Body"	2003	—	You Come Before You
"Letter Thing"	2007	—	Versions
"Trembling Level"	2025		Non-album single
"—" denotes a recording that did not chart or was not released in that territory.

=== Music videos ===
List of music videos, showing year released and director
Title	Year	Director(s)
"Botchla"	2002	Darren Doane
"Apathy Is a Cold Body"	2003	Christopher Sims
"Letter Thing"	2007	Robert Shober
"Exist Underground"	2009	Samuel Macon
"Trembling Level"	2025	Eric Richter
"Thoroughbreds"	2026	Chris Candy
"Everything Hurts"	2026	Chris Candy
"Weeping Tones"	2026	Anthony Altamura

== Accolades ==
Year	Nominator	Nominee / Work	Accolade	Result
2002	Revolver	The Opposite of December... A Season of Separation	"Top 69 Hard Rock Albums of All Time"	No. 50
2003	Kerrang! Magazine Awards	Poison the Well	"Best International Newcomer"	Nominated
2009	Broward & Palm Beach New Times	Poison the Well	"Best Metal / Hardcore band"	Won
2017	Vulturehound Magazine	Versions	"10 Albums At 10"	No. 7
2018	Kerrang! Magazine	The Opposite of December... A Season of Separation	"The 21 Best US Metalcore Albums of All Time"	No. 4
2018	Metal Hammer Magazine	You Come Before You	"The 100 Greatest Albums of the 21st Century"	No. 27
2018	Loudwire	The Opposite of December... A Season of Separation	"25 Best Metalcore Albums of All Time"	No. 2
2019	Brooklyn Vegan	The Opposite of December... A Season of Separation	"15 '90s Metalcore Albums That Still Resonate Today"	No. 15
2019	Loudwire	The Tropic Rot	"The 10 Best Post-Hardcore Albums of the Early 2000s: A Discussion"	No. 10
2020	Brooklyn Vegan	Tear From The Red	"15 Albums That Defined The 2000s Post-Hardcore Boom"	No. 6

== Notes ==
- A For its original 2003 release in the United States, "Ghostchant" was released as a double A-side single with "Zombies Are Good for Your Health".
