= Trágame Tierra =

Studio album by Big Black Delta
- Released: April 22, 2016
- Genre: Electronic music
- Length: 51:21
- Label: Master of Bates

Big Black Delta chronology
Big Black Delta (2013)	Trágame Tierra (2016)

Professional ratings
Aggregate scores
Source	Rating
Metacritic	58/100
Review scores
Source	Rating
Drowned in Sound	(8/10)

Trágame Tierra is the second studio album by American musician Jonathan Bates under his solo project Big Black Delta. It was released in April 2016 under Master of Bates Records.

== Track list ==
No.	Title	Length
1.	"H.A."	2:50
2.	"Steer the Canyon"	4:37
3.	"RCVR (featuring Debbie Gibson)"	4:06
4.	"Bitten by the Apple"	3:54
5.	"Kid Icarus"	3:58
6.	"Overlord"	3:19
7.	"Well My Heart"	3:21
8.	"Let's Go Home"	3:41
9.	"It's OK"	3:33
10.	"Strange Cakes"	4:11
11.	"I See Fit"	3:41
12.	"Trágame Tierra"	10:10
