= Bradley Grace =

Irish musician (born 1982)

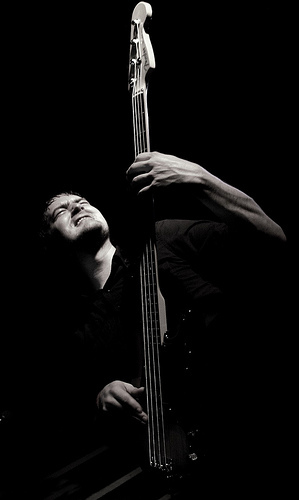
- Grace performing in 2010

Background information
- Born: 1982 (age 43–44); Saggart, Ireland
- Origin: Jupiter, Florida, U.S.
- Genres: Metalcore; indie rock
- Occupations: Musician; singer; songwriter
- Instruments: Bass; guitar; vocals
- Years active: 1990s–present

Bradley James Grace (born 1982) is an Irish-American musician, singer, and songwriter. He is best-known as the former bassist for American metalcore band Poison the Well, and was the longest-tenured bassist in the band's history, having joined in 2006 before departing in 2023. For the three years preceding this, he was the band's guitar tech.

== Early life ==
Grace was born in Saggart in 1982, the son of Irish comedian Brendan Grace. He grew up in Jupiter, Florida, after his family relocated there in the early 1990s.

== History ==
Poison the Well went on hiatus in 2010 after a long tour schedule in support of their last album The Tropic Rot. During this tour, the band's trailer, along with all their musical equipment, was stolen. Since the hiatus, some members of the band have begun working on different projects although nothing has been formally released. On May 15, 2015, Poison the Well played a sold out reunion show at Music Hall of Williamsburg in Brooklyn. The following day, they performed at the Surf and Skate festival in New Jersey. In an interview with the Miami Times, Grace and singer Jeffrey Moreira did not rule out the possibility of future tour plans and a possible new album.

Grace has since released some folk/acoustic work. In 2019, he performed a version of the John Denver song "This Old Guitar" in honor of his late father Brendan Grace at the Olympia Theatre, Dublin, as part of a memorial concert held in Grace's honor. He later recorded the song, releasing it on iTunes and donating the proceeds to an Irish organization assisting caregivers of dementia patients, a cause his father had worked closely with. Grace was credited as an assistant producer on noise pop duo Sleigh Bells' music video "Favorite Transgressions". Derek Miller of Sleigh Bells is also a former guitarist for Poison The Well.

== Discography ==
Solo

- "This Old Guitar" - single, 2019

With Poison the Well

- The Tropic Rot - 2009
