= Alan Landsman =

American vocalist and bassist

- Also known as: Alan the Well
- Born: Alan Michael Landsman; December 10, 1979 (age 46); Baltimore, Maryland, U.S.
- Origin: Coral Springs, Florida, U.S.
- Genre: Metalcore
- Occupations: Singer; musician; lyricist; songwriter; politician
- Instruments: Vocals; bass guitar
- Years active: 1997–2005, 2023 - present
- Labels: Atlantic; Equal Vision; Eulogy; Ferret; Good Life; Rise; Roadrunner; Shock; Surprise Attack; Trustkill; Undecided
- Formerly of: Poison The Well; Target Nevada; The Art of Making Enemies; Until the End

Alan Landsman is an American former vocalist and bass guitarist, noted for having played in several Florida-based metalcore bands, including Poison the Well, Until the End and Target Nevada. He also worked for the independent record label Eulogy Recordings during the early 2000s.

In September 2018, Landsman was convicted by the United States Attorney for the District of Maryland, for conspiracy to commit mail fraud. He was sentenced to 30 months in federal prison, and was released in July 2020. In July 2022, he was appointed to a county seat by the Columbia Borough Council in Columbia, Pennsylvania, a position he was set to hold until December 2023, but was forced to resign when the borough council learned of his existing criminal record.

== Background ==
=== School and music ===
Landsman attended Atholton High School in Columbia, Maryland. As a teenager, Landsman spent his free time skating and making graffiti. He attended his first hardcore show on April 19, 1996, at the First Baptist Church in Annandale, Virginia, where Damnation A.D., Frodus, Battery, Darkest Hour and Astoria performed. Landsman later singled out local Baltimore metalcore band Torn Apart as one of the first hardcore groups he got into.

=== Poison the Well (1998–2000) ===
Landsman joined Coral Springs, Florida-based metalcore band Poison the Well in the fall of 1998 as their new co-lead vocalist, replacing the recently departed Duane Hosein. The band then included co-lead vocalist Aryeh Lehrer, drummer Christopher Hornbrook, bass guitarist Jeronimo Gomez and guitarists Ryan Primack and Derek Miller. After only two rehearsals, however, Landsman switched to bass guitar when Gomez departed, and the band recruited Jeffrey Moreira as new co-lead vocalist. With Landsman newly in the band, Poison the Well played Eulogyfest in November 1998 and Gainesvillefest in December 1998.

The band embarked on a tour of the Northeast and Midwest United States from December 1998–January 1999, supporting its debut extended play Distance Only Makes the Heart Grow Fonder, which had been recorded before Landsman joined, but was only released through Belgian record label Good Life Recordings in September 1998. The band again toured the United States' East Coast and Midwest during July–August 1999, including a stop to perform at the Connecticut Hardcore Festival.

Poison the Well recorded its debut album, The Opposite of December... A Season of Separation, from October 2–10, 1999, with producer Jeremy Staska at Studio 13 in Deerfield Beach, Florida. Originally released by Trustkill Records on December 14, 1999, the album was later reissued on various formats through Good Life Recordings, Roadrunner Records, Shock Records, and Rise Records. The album was the band's first release to appear on CMJ's charts, reaching number 9 on the Loud Rock chart in May 2000, and went on to receive accolades from Revolver, Kerrang!, Loudwire, and BrooklynVegan.

In promotion of The Opposite of December... A Season of Separation, Poison the Well embarked on several North American tours, starting with an East Coast United States tour with Stretch Arm Strong from December 1999 to January 2000. The band next did a two-month tour with Twelve Tribes and This Day Forward from June to August 2000.

The summer tour included stops to perform at such festivals as Fantasy Festival in Miami, Florida, Mixed Messages in Minneapolis, Minnesota, and Hellfest 2K in Syracuse, New York. The band's Hellfest 2K performance was professionally filmed and three songs appeared on Trustkill Records' VHS and DVD Hellfest Syracuse, NY - Summer 2000: The Official Documentary, released on June 12, 2001. The home video also included interviews with Poison the Well. Another highlight event, a radio show performed on June 26, 2000, in Boston, Massachusetts, was recorded; two songs from that broadcast were later used as bonus tracks on Undecided Records' re-issue of Distance Makes the Heart Grow Fonder on April 24, 2001 (by which time Landsman was no longer in the band and received no liner notes credits for his contribution).

In September 2000, Landsman was kicked out of Poison the Well, but he remained with the band long enough to honor previously book concerts, including his last performance on October 6, 2000, at Club Q in Davie, Florida. The split up was bitter and well-publicized by the media, which thrived on rumors that circulated around the event. In retaliation to his firing from Poison the Well, Landsman in turn fired drummer Hornbrook from his other band Until the End. Landsman was replaced by Michael Gordillo in Poison the Well.

=== Until the End (2000–2001) ===
In January 2000, Landsman co-founded the straight edge metalcore band Until the End, taking up dual lead vocals with Peter Kowalsky; the rest of the band was made up of drummer Christopher Hornbrook (from Poison the Well), bass guitarist Daniel Mazin (from Keepsake), and guitarist John Wylie (formerly of Culture, Morning Again and Where Fear and Weapons Meet). The band recorded its debut eponymous extended play in May 2000, with producer Jeremy Staska at Studio 13 in Deerfield Beach, Florida, which was released through Equal Vision Records on September 12, 2000. Following Landsman's firing from Poison the Well, Hornbrook was fired from Until the End in retaliation.

The band recruited drummer Jesse Kriz (also from Keepsake) and second guitarist Mark Mitchell (formerly of Culture and later of Throwdown) to round out the band and began working on its first full-length album (which later took shape as Blood in the Ink), but Landsman wound up leave the band in 2001. Some of Landsman's lyrics would be used on Blood in the Ink. All of the band's recorded material (including three releases recorded after Landsman's span) was compiled on the double compact disc compilation From the Beginning... Until the End, released through Eulogy Recordings on May 13, 2008. On March 23, 2013, Landsman rejoined Until the End for a one-off reunion show at Club Propaganda in Lake Worth Beach, Florida.

=== Eulogy Recordings (2000–2001) ===
During the early 2000s, Landsman worked for Eulogy Recordings, an independent record label owned and operated by Until the End band-mate John Wylie. Following his time at Eulogy Recordings, Landsman worked as a project manager for Sprint.

=== Fraud charges (2016–2018) ===
On April 21, 2016, while living in York, Pennsylvania, Landsman was indicted for conspiracy to commit mail fraud. Landsman was one of nine defendants brought up against charges after years of investigation from the Federal Trade Commission, the Federal Bureau of Investigation, the Internal Revenue Service and the United States Postal Inspection Service. Along with Eric A. Epstein, Brian Keith Wallen, Andrew J. Stafford, Robert Chesser, Brandon D. Riggs, Brandon Johnston, Steven Phillips and Thomas Wishon, Landsman and his co-conspirators pleaded guilty to perpetrating a nationwide fraudulent telemarketing scheme designed to ship unwanted and vastly over-priced light bulbs and cleaning supplies to thousands of businesses and non-profit organizations.

Epstein and his co-conspirators would obtain business information from "global conglomerates, small family-run businesses, government agencies, churches, schools, homeless shelters, and other non-profit businesses" to which they would sell supplies, such as light bulbs and cleaning material, at prices sometimes greater than 8,000% above the supplier's prices.

From 2003 through 2014, Midway employees would cold-call businesses making false representations, including that the business had an existing business relationship with Midway. During these cold-calls, the conspirators sought to obtain the personal information of an “authorized representative” for the business, which the Midway collections department could use later to justify an order. The Midway scam sent fraudulent invoices to victim companies for more than $100 million and received more than $50 million in payments on those invoices, through which the co-conspirators funded lavish lifestyles, including luxury vehicles, million-dollar homes and extravagant jewelry. As early as August 2015, Landsman was questioned and interviewed about his illegal activities by the Federal Trade Commission.

In June 2017, Landsman filed for divorce in York County, Pennsylvania. On September 5, 2018, Landsman was convicted by the United States Attorney for the District of Maryland Chief U.S. District Judge James K. Bredar and sentenced to between 30 months in federal prison. As per his June 6, 2016 plea of guilt agreement, he was also permanently banned from engaging in telemarketing practices, prohibited from misrepresenting himself or any business, and prohibited from selling unordered merchandise. A judgement in the amount of $44,003,680 was entered in favor of the Commission against Landsman and he was ordered to pay to the Commission an additional $14,770, and to transfer the custody of his 2002 BMW F650GS. Landsman was released from federal prison on July 17, 2020.

=== Political borough seat (2022–present) ===
Since October 2020, Landsman has been residing in Columbia, Pennsylvania, where he works as the regional manager for the American Addiction Centers. On April 27, 2022, he started a GoFundMe project to finance a new venture, Columbia Cat Action Team, which traps, neuters, and returns feral cats in Columbia, Pennsylvania. On the strength of this new venture, Landsman applied for a Columbia Borough Council county seat on July 26, 2022. He was one of six applicants that interviewed for the position, and was voted 4–2 in favor of his appointment on the July 26, 2022 evening council meeting. Landsman's term on the borough council seat was set to from July 2022 through December 31, 2023.

The following day, borough council President Heather Zink was sent an anonymous tip, informing her of Landsman's past criminal record. The borough leaders responded that they were unaware of his criminal record or term in federal prison, and admitted that they were also unaware that the state constitution bared those convicted of “infamous” crimes, including felonies, from serving in public office. Evan Gabel, the borough's solicitor who was hired to investigate the complication, confirmed that Landsman was not allowed to hold the position. When interviewed by LNP, Landsman responded “I was excited to roll up my sleeves, get to work, and make a difference. I’ve served my time and paid my debt to society. I want to move on with my life.” Landsman was forced to resign his seat less than a day after being appointed, and was replaced by Joanne Price. The Columbia Borough Council has since announced a plan to create an application for council volunteers, which would allow anyone, regardless of their past, to help serve on the council.
