= The Tropic Rot =

Studio album by Poison the Well
- Released: July 7, 2009
- Recorded: November 2008 – January 2009
- Studios: Castle Oaks Production & The Candy Shop Studios
- Genre: Post-hardcore
- Length: 47:20
- Label: Ferret
- Producer: Steve Evetts

Poison the Well chronology
Versions (2007)	The Tropic Rot (2009)	Peace in Place (2026)

Professional ratings
Review scores
Source	Rating
AbsolutePunk	(80%)
AllMusic	3.5/5 stars
Chronicles of Chaos	7.5/10
Hearwax Media	(8.2/10)
Lambgoat	7/10 stars
Thrash Hits	4.5/6 stars

The Tropic Rot is the fifth studio album by American hardcore punk band Poison the Well. The album was released on July 7, 2009 through Ferret Music. The album was originally intended to be produced by J. Robbins, however due to a family emergency he had to be replaced by Steve Evetts.

The Tropic Rot received positive reviews and peaked at number 180 on the Billboard 200.

== Track listing ==
All music and lyrics written by Poison the Well.

1. "Exist Underground" – 3:36
2. "Sparks It Will Rain" – 4:07
3. "Cinema" – 4:22
4. "Pamplemousse" – 5:51
5. "Who Doesn't Love a Good Dismemberment?" – 4:05
6. "Antarctica Inside Me" – 5:07
7. "When You Lose I Lose As Well" – 3:30
8. "Celebrate the Pyre" – 3:04
9. "Are You Anywhere?" – 5:25
10. "Makeshift Clay You" – 2:40
11. "Without You and One Other I Am Nothing" – 5:33

Vinyl edition bonus tracks

12. "D10 D11" – 4:10
13. "Deportation Spreads" – 4:08

Digital deluxe edition bonus tracks (from I/III / II/III / III/III)

12. "New Fast" – 2:11
13. "Purple Sabbath" – 4:52
14. "Shuffle" – 3:20
15. "Bowie" – 4:40
16. "A#No.1" – 2:35
17. "Run Desire Gone Clean" – 1:02

== Personnel ==
Poison the Well

- Jeff Moreira – vocals
- Ryan Primack – guitar, keyboards
- Bradley Grace – bass guitar, background vocals, guitar, stomps
- Chris Hornbrook – drums and percussion
- Brad Clifford – guitar

Production

- Produced and engineered by Steve Evetts at Castle Oaks Production & The Candy Shop Studios
- Mastered by Alan Douches for West West Side Music

Art

- Layout and design by Sons of Nero
