= The Opposite of December... A Season of Separation =

1999 studio album by Poison the Well

Studio album by Poison the Well
- Released: December 14, 1999
- Recorded: October 2–10, 1999
- Studios: Studio 13, Deerfield Beach, Florida, United States
- Genres: Metalcore; melodic metalcore; pop screamo; hardcore punk
- Length: 28:15
- Label: Trustkill
- Producers: Jeremy Staska; Poison the Well

Poison the Well chronology
Distance Only Makes the Heart Grow Fonder (1998)	The Opposite of December... A Season of Separation (1999)	Tear from the Red (2002)

Limited edition cover
- The Opposite of December... A Season of Separation limited edition CD Release Show cover.

2012 Reissue cover
- The Opposite of December / Tear from the Red 2012 reissue cover.

20th Anniversary Reissue cover
- The Opposite of December... A Season of Separation 20th Anniversary reissue cover.

The Opposite of December... A Season of Separation is the debut full-length album by American metalcore band Poison the Well. It was released on December 14, 1999. The album was recorded with vocalist Jeffrey Moreira, bassist Alan Landsman, drummer Christopher Hornbrook and guitarists Ryan Primack and Derek Miller. Former vocalists Duane Hosein and Aryeh Lehrer were both invited to provide backing vocals on a song.

In promotion of the album, Poison the Well toured the United States several times between December 1999 and September 2001, including performs internationally in Canada and Belgium. However, the band saw multiple issues, such as multiple failed Canadian tours and Moreira also suffered a pneumothorax on the final leg of the tour. Landsman was also shortly replaced by multiple touring bassists after the release. Despite this, the album sold over 30,000 copies by 2002 and is considered to be influential in the early popularization of metalcore and a landmark album in the genre. The release received numerous reissues on various formats over the years through such record labels as Good Life Recordings, Roadrunner Records, Shock Records and Rise Records. It was digitally remastered in 2012.

In 2020, John Hill of Loudwire placed the album at number 2 in his list of the "Top 25 Metalcore Albums of All Time."

== Background and recording ==
Poison the Well recorded the album from October 2–10, 1999, with producer Jeremy Staska at Studio 13 in Deerfield Beach, Florida. The album's recordings consisted of vocalist Jeffrey Moreira, bassist Alan Landsman, drummer Christopher Hornbrook and guitarists Ryan Primack and Derek Miller. The band invited former vocalists Duane Hosein and Aryeh Lehrer to provide backing vocals on the song "Not Within Arms Length", the lyrics of which had been written by Hosein before he left the band in 1998.

The Opposite of December... A Season of Separation was initially scheduled to be released solely by Good Life Recordings but the band gained the attention of New Jersey–based record label Trustkill Records, who quickly signed them to a record deal less than a week after the record was completed. Good Life Recordings retained permission to release the 12" vinyl version of the album, while Trustkill Records released the compact disc version.

Immediately after the recording session, lead guitarist Primack quit the band briefly (for the second time) and was replaced by José Martinez. Primack returned in time for the album release show on December 11, 1999, at Club Q in Davie, Florida, where the band performed with Where Fear and Weapons Meet, Brethren, Red Roses for a Blue Lady, 32/40 and Cho.

== Music and lyrics ==
Loudwire states that the album's sound was "created by fusing together metalcore’s abrasiveness with the sincerity of emotive hardcore." Lyrical themes explored on the album include depression and hopelessness.

== Release and packaging ==
Trustkill Records released the compact disc edition on December 14, 1999. The band had received the discs from Trustkill Records in time for the album release show, but not the artwork nor the jewel cases. So the band photocopied a special insert labeled the "CD Release Show" edition which was limited to 50 copies. Good Life Recordings released the album on vinyl in March 2000. The artwork and layout was designed by Converge vocalist Jacob Bannon through his graphic design company Atomic! Information Design.

In August 2004, Trustkill Records signed a deal with Roadrunner Records for a selection of their releases to be reissued in foreign markets such as the United Kingdom and Europe. The album was re-released in France, Germany and the Netherlands on October 11, 2004 and in the United Kingdom on October 25, 2004.

In early 2007, Trustkill Records signed a deal with Shock Records for a selection of their past releases to be distributed in Australasia. Through this distribution deal, The Opposite of December... A Season of Separation was finally made available locally in Australia and New Zealand. It was released to the Australasia market on June 2, 2007. Shock Records also began repressing the release directly in Australia as part of the label's series 2 CDs For The Price Of 1. The Opposite of December... A Season of Separation and Poison The Well's next album, Tear from the Red, were each pressed in separate jewel cases. The double-disc release was sold as a single unit starting on February 16, 2008.

On March 25, 2008, Trustkill Records re-released The Opposite of December... A Season of Separation and Tear from the Red in a special double-LP. Each side of the gatefold cover featured the front artwork of each album (The Opposite of December... A Season of Separation on the front and Tear from the Red on the back).

On May 4, 2012, it was revealed that Rise Records had secured the rights to the reissues and would be releasing them in the summer of 2012. Rise Records went to the extent of having all of the audio content remastered and designing a new artwork and layout. The two albums were remastered by Will Putney, while the artwork was adapted by merging the two releases' original artworks together. The 19-song, double-release compilation The Opposite of December... A Season of Separation / Tear from the Red, was released on November 20, 2012. Rise Records also printed limited edition t-shirts, hoodies and posters in promotion of the reissue.

On January 18, 2020, Poison the Well performed a 20th Anniversary concert in celebration of their debut album The Opposite of December... A Season of Separation. The event took place at the El Rey Theater in Los Angeles, California where the band performed a selection of eight songs from their past releases, followed by The Opposite of December... A Season of Separation in its entirety. The band also re-pressed their debut album featuring a revised layout, an expanded commemorative booklet and new liner notes designed by Touché Amoré guitarist Nick Steinhardt. Several mistakes were made while designing the commemorative booklet, such as writing that the album had originally been released on December 14, 2000 (a whole year later than it actually was) and using low-resolution pictures and flyers directly from Instagram and Discogs, at times from shows that were played on tours outside the promotion of the album (shows from before the album was released or from tours promoting later releases). Steinhardt also designed exclusive t-shirts, long sleeve shirts and hoodies for sale at the 20th Anniversary show and as bundles for online orders. The band had anticipated having the vinyl ready in time for their concert but due to pressing plant delays, it was only released on February 21, 2020.

== Promotion ==
Poison the Well toured vigorously in 2000 to promote their debut album. They toured with Stretch Arm Strong and played at multiple festivals. The band's Hellfest 2K performance was professionally filmed and three songs ("Slice Paper Wrists", "Nerdy" and "Artist's Rendering of Me") were used on Trustkill Records' VHS and DVD Hellfest Syracuse, NY - Summer 2000: The Official Documentary, released on June 12, 2001. The home video also included interviews with Poison the Well and a live performance by metalcore band NORA with whom Primack had played in place of their absent guitarist.

The band also toured with Twelve Tribes, who was promoting its new extended play Instruments, which featured guest vocals from Moreira on the song "Milk And Mice Pocketknife". Poison The Well did a summer tour in 2000, covering multiple regions of the United States from June to August 2000. The tour saw This Day Forward briefly joining the tour for one of the legs. Poison the Well and Twelve Tribes were scheduled to play a few Canadian dates as part of the tour at the end of June 2000 but due to lack of paperwork, they were denied entry. Rhythm guitarist Miller was also unable to participate in the summer tour so former Twelve Tribes bassist Matthew Tackett filled in. A radio show performed on June 26 in Boston, Massachusetts, was recorded; two songs from that broadcast were later used as bonus tracks on Undecided Records' re-issue of Distance Only Makes the Heart Grow Fonder in 2001.

Bassist Landsman was kicked out of the band in September 2000 and was replaced by Michael Gordillo who continued to tour with the band in promotion of The Opposite of December... A Season of Separation. On October 20, 2000, Poison the Well also performed for CMJ MusicFest Marathon. In November 2000, Poison the Well toured the East Coast with Brother's Keeper and NORA. As rhythm guitarist Miller was obligated to finish his school semester, guitarist Michael Peters took his place for the first leg of the tour but returned shortly after. Canadian dates were planned, however Poison the Well was denied entry into Canada for the second time again due to lack of necessary paperwork.

Poison the Well continued touring for most of 2001 in promotion of The Opposite of December... A Season of Separation, including Hellfest in East Syracuse, New York and Krazy Fest 4 in Louisville, Kentucky. They were also scheduled to play the New England Metal and Hardcore Festival in Worcester, Massachusetts, but had to cancel due to touring conflicts with other shows. Poison the Well had also booked a tour around Asia for March 2001, with dates in China and Japan, but due to trouble with the booking agency, the entire trip was cancelled. In February 2001, Gordillo departed; a month later he was replaced by California-based bassist Javier Van Huss From mid-March to mid-April 2001, Poison the Well toured the United States again with Candiria, Origin and Cryptopsy. Van Huss left Poison the Well immediately after the tour. Albert joined as Poison the Well's new bassist.

In 2001, Poison the Well continued to tour extensively with bands like Until the End (which also kicked out Landsman as the vocalist), Glasseater, Codeseven, Love Lost but Not Forgotten, Cataract, Curl Up and Die and Eighteen Visions. In late July 2001, the band played three shows in Belgium, their first time performing in Europe. The band had originally hopped to do a full European tour but due to previous engagements, but they were only able to commit to three dates. Albert left Poison the Well at the end of July 2001.

Bassist Iano Dovi joined in August 2001 for a two-week tour with Unearth, God Forbid and Martyr AD across Canada and the Northeastern and Midwestern America. The tour started out positively in comparison to their other Canadian tours, as Trustkill Records ensured that all of the bands had the proper paperwork to enter Canada legally and wouldn't get denied again. However, after playing their second show in Montreal, Poison the Well's van was broken into and all of their equipment was stolen. Moreira was so distraught by the theft that he engaged in a screaming fit in the parking lot of the venue, damaging his throat, which worsened into pneumonia over the next two weeks on the road. The band made arrangements with members of the other bands on the tour to borrow their equipment each night to play shows. Before the band could drive out of Montreal, their van's transmission also died and Poison the Well was forced to stay behind while the other played the rest of the Canadian dates. Poison the Well was only able to rejoin the tour four days later in Wilkes-Barre, Pennsylvania. From Autumn to Ashes also joined the tour later on. By the end of the tour, Moreira's had troubles with his voice and From Autumn to Ashes' Francis Mark filled in. Upon returning home on September 6, 2001, Moreira was rushed to the hospital where he was treated for a collapsed lung. Moreira, at the time, was an active smoker and the incident motivated him to quit smoking cigarettes.

== Reception ==
The Opposite of December... A Season of Separation reached number 9 on CMJ's Loud Rock chart in May 2000.

Professional ratings
Review scores
Source	Rating
AllMusic	4.5/5 stars

In a contemporary review for Exclaim!, Chris Gramlich praised the contrast between the album’s heavy riffs and its acoustic passages and clean vocals. He singled out "A Wish for Wings That Work" and "Slice Paper Wrists" as examples of this approach, while suggesting that the band had potential for further development.

=== Accolades ===
Year	Nominator	Accolade	Result
2002	Revolver	"Top 69 Hard Rock Albums of All Time"	No. 50
2018	Kerrang! Magazine	"The 21 Best US Metalcore Albums of All Time"	No. 4
2018	Loudwire	"25 Best Metalcore Albums of All Time"	No. 2
2019	Brooklyn Vegan	"15 '90s Metalcore Albums That Still Resonate Today"	No. 15

- Noise Creep Poison the Well's Ryan Primack Flattered by The Opposite of December being considered a landmark album.
- Punktastic "Back on Deck: Poison the Well – 'The Opposite of December'".
- Kill The Music "Retrospective: Poison The Well - The Opposite of December".

== Track listing ==
Credits are adapted from the album's liner notes.

No.	Title	Lyrics	Music	Length
1.	"12/23/93"	Moreira	Primack; Hornbrook; Derek Miller	3:07
2.	"A Wish for Wings That Work"	Moreira	Primack; Hornbrook; Miller	3:33
3.	"Artist's Rendering of Me"	Moreira	Primack; Hornbrook	3:20
4.	"Slice Paper Wrists"	Moreira	Primack; Hornbrook; Miller	3:56
5.	"Nerdy"	Moreira	Primack; Hornbrook; Miller	2:44
6.	"To Mandate Heaven"	Moreira	Primack; Hornbrook; Miller	2:40
7.	"Not Within Arms Length"	Hosein	Primack; Hornbrook; Miller	2:27
8.	"Mid Air Love Message"	Moreira	Primack; Hornbrook; Miller	3:09
9.	"My Mirror No Longer Reflects"	Moreira	Primack; Hornbrook; Miller	3:19
Total length:				28:15

== Personnel ==
Credits are adapted from the album's liner notes.

Poison the Well

- Jeffrey Moreira – lead vocals
- Ryan Primack – lead guitar
- Derek Miller – rhythm guitar
- Alan Landsman – bass guitar
- Christopher Hornbrook – drums

Guest musicians

- Duane Hosein – backing vocals on "Not Within Arms Length"
- Aryeh Lehrer – backing vocals on "Not Within Arms Length"

Production

- Poison the Well – co-producer
- Jeremy Staska – recording engineer, mixer and producer at Studio 13
- Jacob Bannon – art direction and design at Atomic! Information Design
- Nick Steinhardt – art direction and design at Smog Design (20th Anniversary reissue)
