= Chris Hornbrook =

American musician

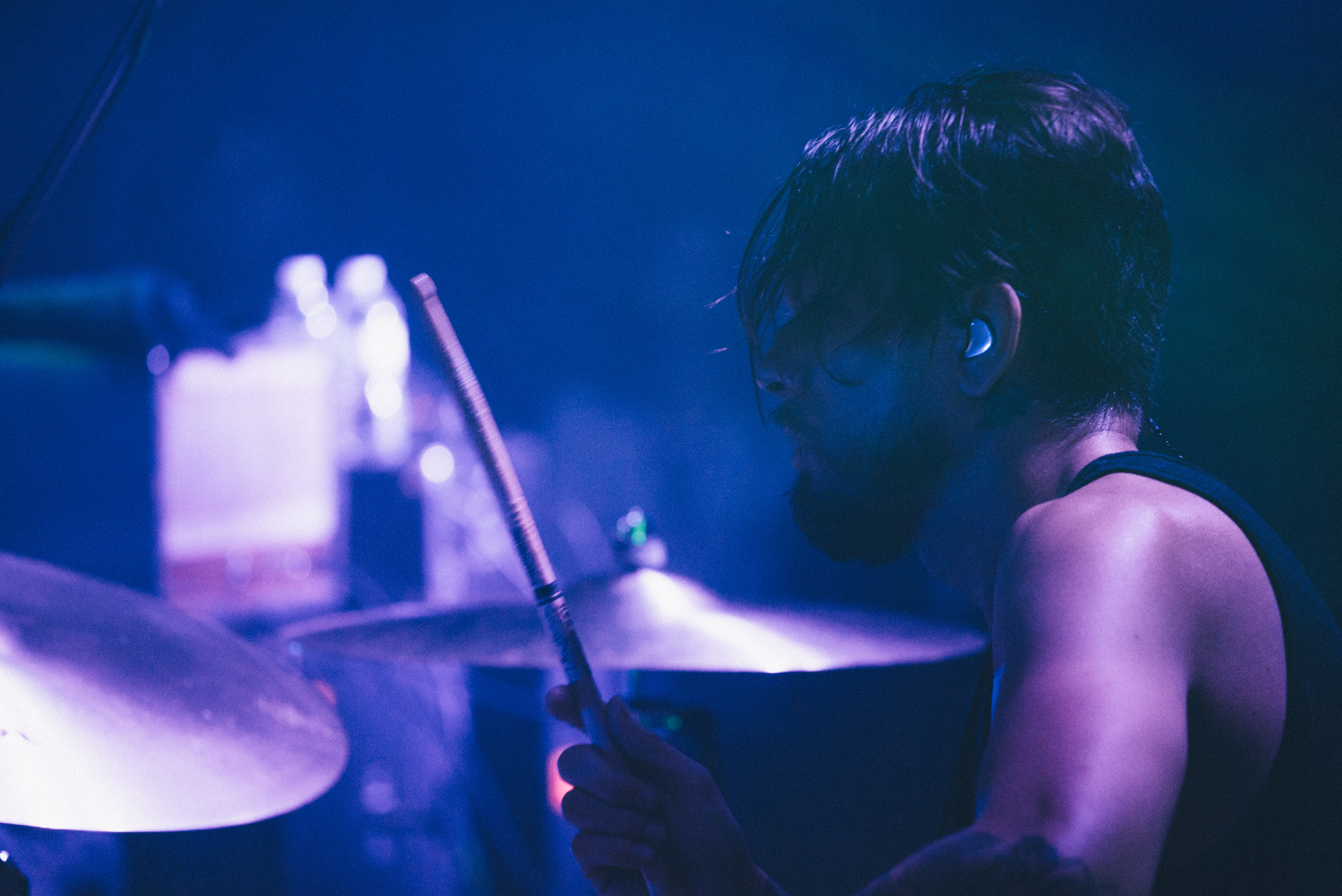
- Hornbrook on tour with Senses Fail.

Background information
- Born: Christopher Aaron Hornbrook
- Origin: Fort Lauderdale, Florida, current Long Beach, California
- Genres: Post-hardcore, metalcore
- Instruments: Drums, Percussion
- Years active: 1998–present
- Website: www.chrishornbrook.com

Christopher Aaron Hornbrook is an American drummer and a founding member of metalcore/post-hardcore band, Poison the Well. He also is working with Dhani Harrison and Killer Be Killed and Greg Puciato. From 2014 to 2018, Hornbrook was also a member of Senses Fail.

== Early life ==
Chris Hornbrook was born in Hollywood, Florida, to French-Canadian immigrants, Donald Hornbrook and Moisette Maltais, in the early nineteen eighties. He started playing local South Florida punk shows at the age of fifteen with his high school garage band before being asked to join a local punk band called Last Minute. He met future band member Ryan Primack as he was playing bass in the band. At seventeen Hornbrook was asked to join an early incarnation of Poison the Well dubbed Doubting Thomas. Not too long after the bands' formation they had to change their name to An Acre Lost due to Doubting Thomas already being a side project of industrial band Skinny Puppy.

After a brief hiatus with An Acre Lost Hornbrook rejoined the band and the name was changed to Poison the Well. During his junior year of high school, he toured with the band during breaks from school. Then during his senior year, Poison the Well played a few shows up the east coast of the United States one weekend a month.

There is footage of the band performing at the now defunct CBGB's on YouTube from around this period. Once he graduated high school he started to pursue the band more seriously as a career.

== Drumming style and influences ==
His drumming style has been described as very musical and heavy hitting with an emphasis on groove and feel. He was quoted as saying: “I think fundamentally I always strive to do what the song calls for. Whether it’s a lot, or really simple, or whatever. I think that’s the most important thing. That’s the role that the drummer has, to hold everything together. Play a beat and be really musical. Not to say that I don’t enjoy overplaying, but it has to be the right sort of environment for that. I’m not a big fan of guys that like to do a lot and it sounds like they’re trampling over the music because they’re trying to prove whatever point they’re trying to prove. Ultimately, I look to serve the song and do exactly what it needs to be effective from the drumming department." Ghostcult Magazine was quoted as saying "Chris is one of the most distinctive drummers in music for almost 20 years".

Hornbrook has stated that he was "obsessed" with English rock band Queen drummer Roger Taylor when he first started playing. Other early influences were Matt Cameron, Dave Abbruzzese and Dave Grohl. His later influences expanded to Billy Cobham and Chris Dave.

== Poison the Well ==
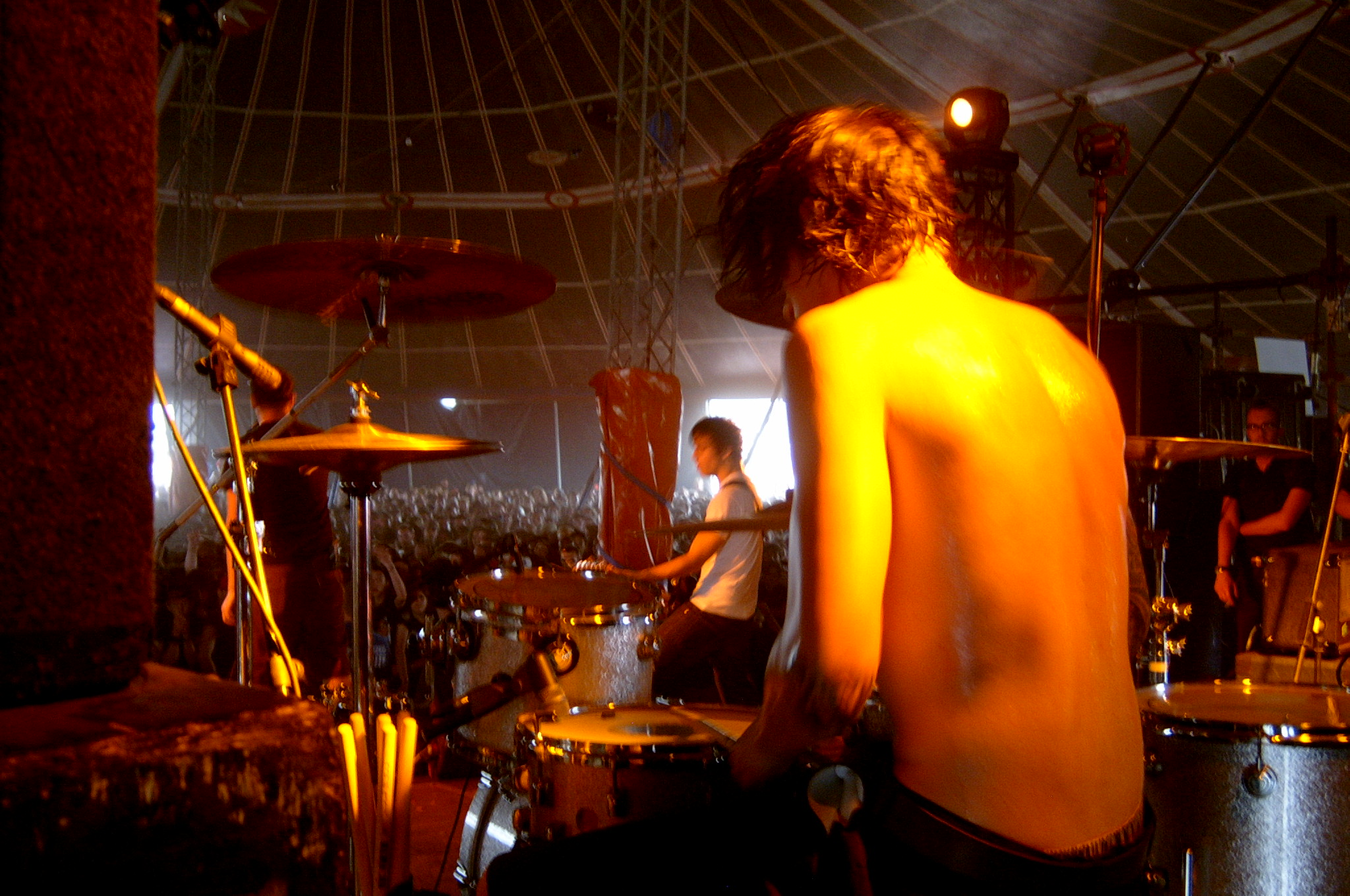
Hornbrook performing with Poison the Well at the Leeds Music Festival in Leeds, England in 2004.

Hornbrook started working with Poison the Well in 1998. He has drummed on all six of the bands' full-length records, both EPs and performed on all the touring in support of those records. Alongside being a founding member he is also considered to be a part of the core lineup alongside guitar player Ryan Primack and vocalist Jeffrey Moreira.

In an interview he did with The Washington Post during the promotion of the bands' fourth record "Versions", he stated, "I wanted to push the envelope. Thinking deep down I wasn’t trying to prove anything to anyone else, but prove to ourselves that we could make a record better than our last one and make something different and innovative.” Poison the Well are considered as one of the fathers of what is now referred to as contemporary "Metalcore" helping to popularize the genre. They were also an influential band during the early 2000s Post-hardcore "boom".

== Notable work outside of Poison the Well ==
=== Shai Hulud (1999) ===
In early February 1999, Hornbrook joined Shai Hulud filling in as their drummer after the departure of Steve Kleisath. Hornbrook performed with Shai Hulud for roughly three weeks including a one-off show at Middlesex County College in Edison, New Jersey on February 27, 1999, with Hatebreed, Cave In, The Judas Factor, Linus, As Darkness Falls and The Degenerics. Hornbrook departed when Shai Hulud recruited drummer Andrew Gormley.

=== Big Black Delta (2012–present) ===
In 2012, Hornbrook was invited to perform live with electronic pop artist Big Black Delta. During his time with Big Black Delta, they toured with M83, Jane's Addiction, and Gary Numan. The group performed at SXSW, Rock en Seine, Reading Festival, Leeds Festival, Electric Picnic, Berlin Festival, and Boston Calling Music Festival. Big Black Delta also performed live on Last Call With Carson Daly during their time at SXSW in 2013.

=== Senses Fail (2014–2018) ===
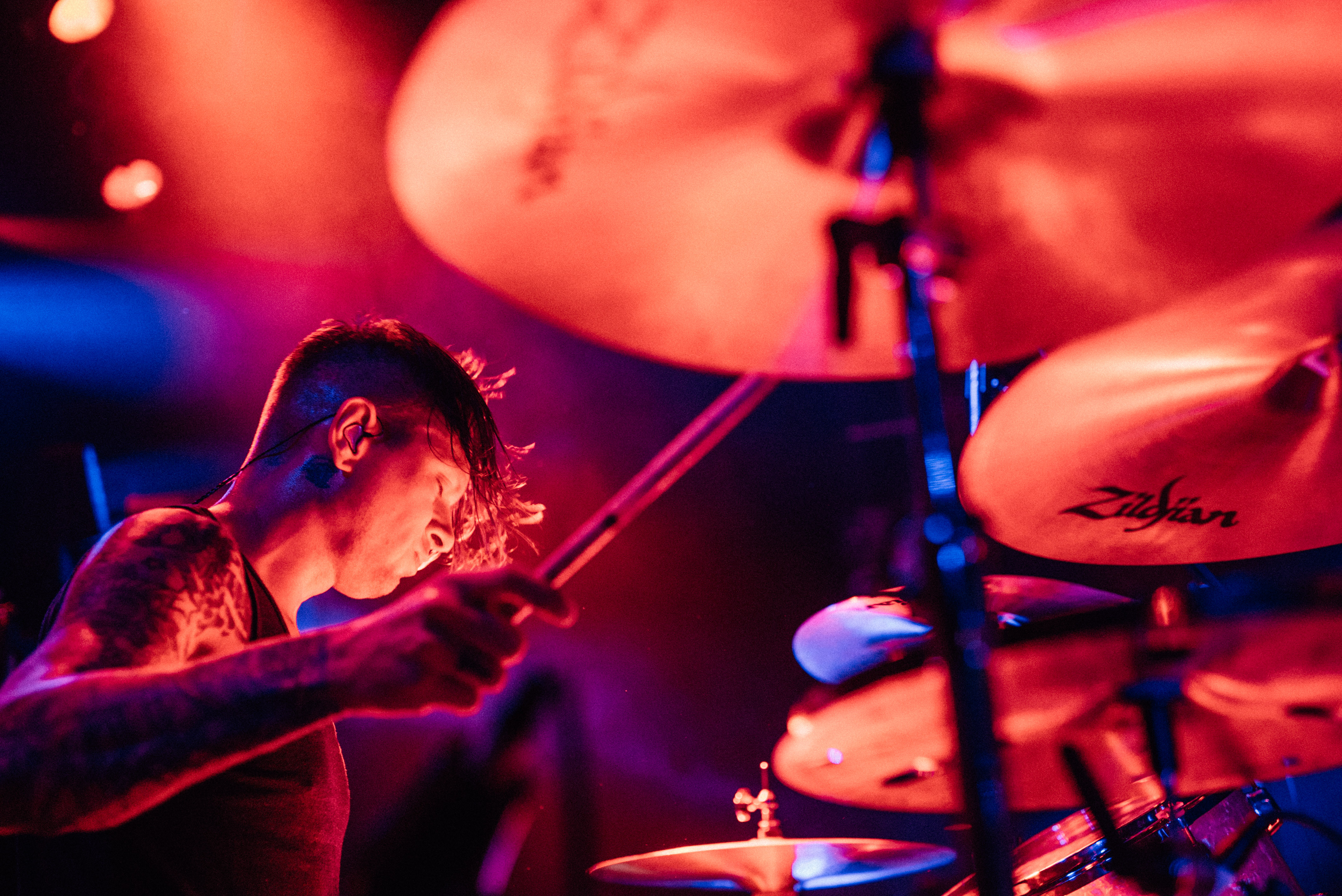
Hornbrook Performing live with Senses Fail in 2015.

It was announced on June 2, 2014, via Alternative Press that Hornbrook would be replacing original Senses Fail drummer Dan Trapp on the band's tenth-anniversary tour of their seminal release "Let It Enfold You". It was revealed later that year that he would also be participating in the band's seventh studio record "Pull The Thorns From Your Heart". Hornbrook toured with Senses Fail from 2014 through 2018 before announcing his departure on January 8, 2018.

=== Dhani Harrison (2018–present) ===
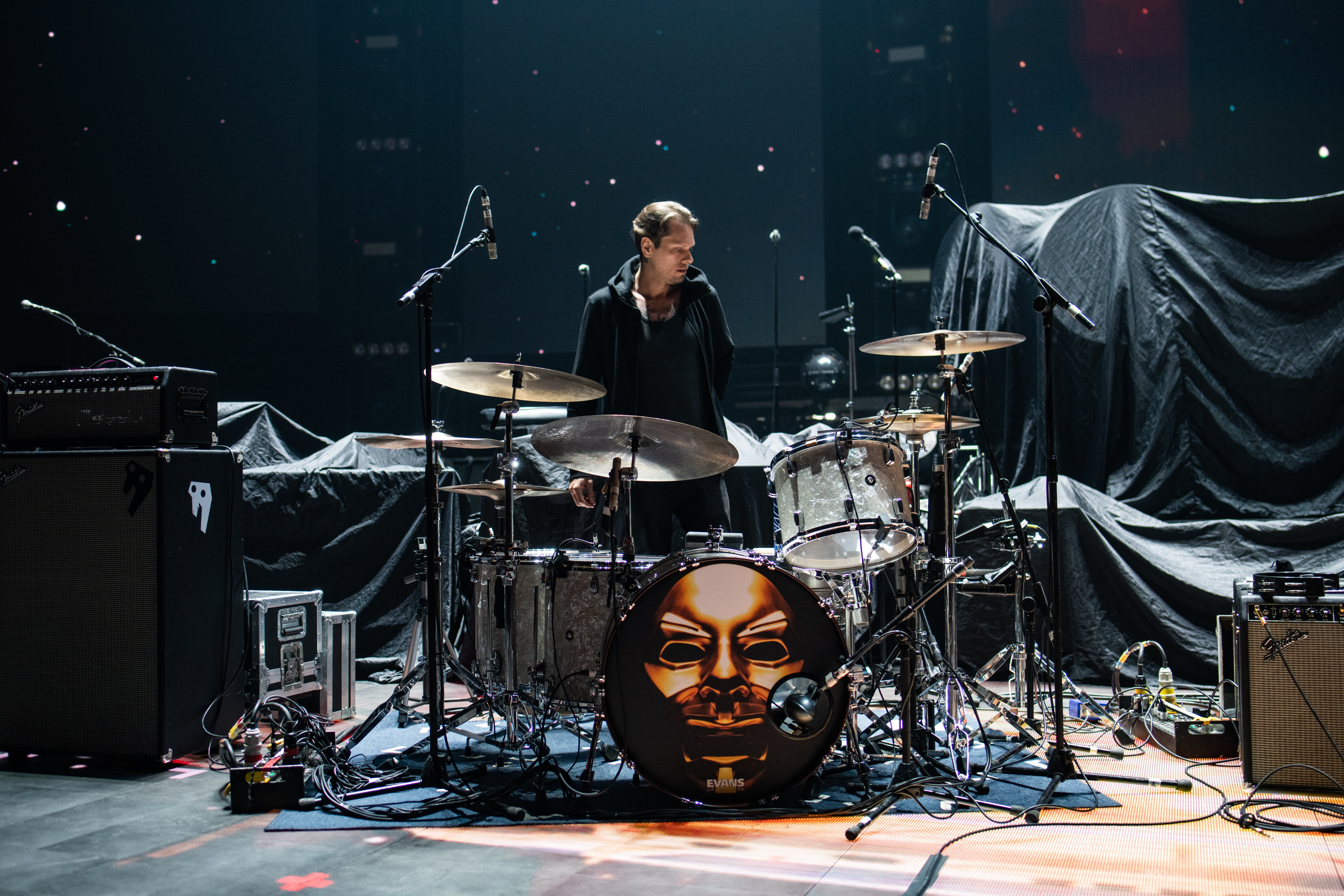
Hornbrook on tour with Dhani Harrison while supporting Jeff Lynn's ELO in the Summer of 2019.

Hornbrook was invited by Dhani Harrison to be in his backing band for the touring and promotion of his first solo record: "IN///PARALLEL". The bands' first show was at The Echo in Los Angeles, California on July 4, 2017 with an additional appearance at the Panorama Music Festival on Randall's Island on July 29, 2017, in New York City. They performed live on Jimmy Kimmel Live! and Conan O'Brien. The band also performed at In Bloom Festival, Bottlerock Napa, Sasquatch! Music Festival, The RIDE Festival, and Lollapalooza Berlin.

Hornbrook also makes an appearance on Harrison's live performance film "IN///PARALIVE" alongside musicians Davide Rossi of Coldplay, Stephen Perkins of Jane's Addiction, Big Black Delta, Camila Grey of Uh Huh Her and Mereki Beach. "IN///PARALIVE" was filmed and recorded at Jim Henson Studios in Los Angeles, California in late 2017. It was produced and engineered by Paul Hicks. The film was also mixed by Hicks and Ryan Williams. It was released via Harrisons's Facebook page on June 14, 2019.

=== Greg Puciato (2019–present) ===
It was announced in early 2020 that Greg Puciato's first solo record: Child Soldier: Creator of God would predominately feature Hornbrook's drumming. Puciato was quoted as saying "I’ve known Chris Hornbrook since we were 23. He knows how to hit a drum. For a lot of the songs on this record, I knew he was the guy." Out of the fifteen tracks on Child Soldier: Creator of God Hornbrook drummed on a majority of the record with Chris Pennie (ex-The Dillinger Escape Plan, Coheed and Cambria) and Ben Koller (Converge, Mutoid Man) drumming on a few other tracks. A majority were programmed by Puciato with some assistance from Rowe. The record was produced and engineered by Nicholas Rowe. It will be released on Puciato's record label Federal Prisoner on October 23, 2020.

On May 1, Federal Prisoner announced the premiere of Puciato's second single, "Deep Set" which features Hornbrook on drums The single was released on two limited quantity pressings of colored vinyl. Hornbrook was in a drum play-through feature of "Deep Set" exclusively with Modern Drummer Magazine on May 27.

On July 9 Puciato premiered his third single "Do You Need Me to Remind You" via Sirius Metal Liquid Metal show accompanied by a music video that premiered with Revolver Magazine on July 10. Hornbrook is both featured on the track and in the music video alongside Puciato. The single was released on two limited quantity pressings of colored vinyl. Hornbrook was featured in an exclusive drum play-through of "Do You Need Me to Remind You?" with DRUM! on July 17.

On October 2, Puciato released the fifth single "Down When I'm Not" which featured Hornbrook on drums.

On November 24, Federal Prisoner announced via Instagram that Greg Puciato would premiere “Fuck Content,” a stream performance "marrying visual art, audio, live performance, studio footage" on December 11, 2020. Hornbrook was featured on drums throughout the film.

== Discography ==
Year	Band / Artist	Format	Record / Movie	Record label	Singles / Music Videos
1998	Poison the Well	EP	Distance Only Makes the Heart Grow Fonder	Goodlife	
1999	Poison the Well	LP	The Opposite of December...A Season of Separation	Trustkill	
2000	Keepsake	EP	She Hums Like A Radio	Red Dawn	
2000	Until the End	EP	Until the End	Equal Vision	
2001	Poison the Well	EP	Distance Makes the Heart Grow Fonder (re-release)	Undecided	
2002	Poison the Well	LP	Tear From the Red	Trustkill	"Botchla"
2003	Poison the Well	LP	You Come Before You	Atlantic	"Apathy is a Cold Body"
2007	Poison the Well	LP	Versions	Ferret	"Letter Thing"
2009	Poison the Well	EP	I/III / II/III / III/III	Ferret	"Purple Sabbath"
2009	Poison the Well	LP	The Tropic Rot	Ferret	"Exist Underground"
2013	Poison the Well	LP	The Opposite of December... A Season of Separation / Tear From the Red (double LP re-release)	RISE	"Botchla" and "Nerdy"
2015	Senses Fail	Split	Man Overboard/Senses Fail	Pure Noise	"All You Need Is Already Within You"
2015	Senses Fail	LP	Pull the Thorns from Your Heart	Pure Noise	"The Importance of the Moment of Death"
2016	The Black Queen	LP	Fever Daydream	Self-released	
2017	Dhani Harrison & Paul Hicks	N/A	Obey Giant (Film)	Hulu	
2017	The Relentless	N/A	American Satan (Film)	Sumerian	"Me Against The Devil"
2019	Dhani Harrison	N/A	IN///PARALIVE (Film)	H.O.T.	"Never Know"
2020	Poison the Well	LP	The Opposite of December... A Season of Separation 20th Anniversary reissue	Self-released	
2020	Greg Puciato	LP	Child Soldier: Creator Of God	Federal Prisoner	"Deep Set", "Do You Need Me to Remind You?", "Down When I'm Not"
2020	Greg Puciato	LP	FUCK CONTENT	Federal Prisoner	"Absence as a Presence", "Evacuation"

== Videography ==
Year	Band / Artist	Video / DVD	Notes
2001	Poison the Well	"Hellfest 2000"	Drummer
2002	Poison the Well	"Botchla"	Drummer
2002	Poison the Well	"Tear from the Road"	Interviewed and drummer
2003	Poison the Well	"Fall 2003 DVD"	Interviewed and drummer
2004	Poison the Well	"Warped Tour 2003"	Drummer
2004	Poison the Well	"Apathy is a Cold Body"	Drummer
2007	Poison the Well	"Sounds of the Underground"	Drummer
2007	Poison the Well	"Letter Thing"	Drummer
2008	Unearth	"Alive from the Apocalypse"	Interviewed
2009	Poison the Well	"Exist Underground"	Drummer
2013	Big Black Delta	"Side of the Road"	Drummer
2014	Big Black Delta	"Money Rain Down"	Extra
2018	Sleigh Bells	"All Saints"	Black metal band drummer
2019	N/A	The Showcase Theatre Documentary	Interviewed
2020	Greg Puciato	"Do You Need Me To Remind You?"	Drummer
2020	Greg Puciato	"Absence as a Presence"	Drummer
