= You Come Before You =

Studio album by Poison the Well
- Released: July 1, 2003
- Recorded: January–April 2003
- Studio: Sound City (Van Nuys); Studio 13 (Deerfield Beach); Tonteknik Recording (Umeå)
- Genre: Post-hardcore, metalcore, pop screamo
- Length: 42:59
- Label: Atlantic; Warner (Japan)
- Producer: Eskil Lövström; Pelle Henricsson; Jeremy Staska

Poison the Well chronology
| Tear from the Red (2002) | You Come Before You (2003) | Versions (2007) |

Professional ratings
Review scores
| Source | Rating |
|---|---|
| AllMusic | 4.5/5 stars |
| Alternative Press | 4/5 |
| Ox-Fanzine | 5/5 stars |
| Rock Hard | 7/10 |

You Come Before You is the third full-length album by American metalcore band Poison the Well. It was released on July 1, 2003. It is the band's only release on a major label (Atlantic Records). More than 115,500 copies of the album have been sold in the U.S. to date. The Japanese version was released through Warner Music Japan on October 29, 2003 and featured an exclusive bonus track, "Sticks and Stones Never Made Sense (Demo)" which had been recorded in early October 2000.

Metal Hammer and Loudwire have both named the album as one of the greatest metal albums of the 21st century. In 2019, Rock Sound ranked the album at number 122 on its list of the "250 Greatest Albums of Our Lifetime", who said that it was "arguably [Poison The Well's] most innovative [release], boasting a fiery melange of hardcore, punk and post-rock".

On November 17, 2017, Poison the Well spoke out against a vinyl re-press of You Come Before You done through German record label Backbite Records, stating that the band had not been consulted for the release. The band criticized the subpar audio quality, the poor layout and noted numerous misspelling of words, song titles and the album's title on the artwork. The record label, however, claimed that they had received permission from the album's master rights owner Warner Music Group and had paid "thousands of Euros" for a reproduction license. Backbite Records made no explanation as to the poor quality of the audio nor of the misspellings on the artwork. Poison the Well maintained that Backbite Records' tactics were unethical and that the band should still have been contacted as mere professional courtesy.

== Track listing ==
1. "Ghostchant" – 3:33
2. "Loved Ones (Excerpts from Speeches of How Great You Were, and Will Never Be Again)" – 3:53
3. "For a Bandaged Iris" – 4:27
4. "Meeting Again for the First Time" – 4:18
5. "A) The View from Here Is... B) A Brick Wall" – 3:12
6. "The Realist" – 3:49
7. "Zombies Are Good for Your Health" – 2:24
8. "The Opinionated Are So Opinionated" – 1:34
9. "Apathy Is a Cold Body" – 5:00
10. "Sounds Like the End of the World" – 4:24
11. "Pleasant Bullet" – 3:35
12. "Crystal Lake" – 2:50

=== Japanese bonus tracks ===
13. "Sticks and Stones Never Made Sense" (Demo) – 3:15

== Personnel ==
Poison the Well

- Jeffrey Moreira – vocals
- Derek Miller – guitar
- Ryan Primack – guitar
- Geoffrey Bergman – bass (songs 1–12)
- Michael Gordillo – bass (song 13)
- Christopher Hornbrook – drums

Others

- Don Clark – art direction, design for Asterik Studio, Seattle
- Pelle Henricsson – recording, mixing, mastering (songs 1–12)
- Eskil Lovstrom – recording, mixing, mastering (songs 1–12)
- Jeremy Staska – recording, producer (song 13)

== Nominations, awards and accolades ==
Kerrang! 2003 Nomination for "Best International Newcomer".
