= Distance Only Makes the Heart Grow Fonder =

1998 EP by Poison the Well

EP by Poison the Well
- Released: September 1998; April 24, 2001 (reissue)
- Recorded: May 25, 1998 – May 28, 1998
- Studios: Studio 13, Deerfield Beach, Florida, United States
- Genre: Melodic metalcore
- Length: 17:59; 24:16 (reissue)
- Labels: Good Life; Undecided
- Producers: Jeremy Staska; Poison the Well

Poison the Well chronology
| Distance Only Makes the Heart Grow Fonder (1998) | The Opposite of December... A Season of Separation (1999) |

2001 Reissue cover
- Distance Makes the Heart Grow Fonder 2001 reissue cover.

Distance Only Makes the Heart Grow Fonder is the third release by American metalcore band Poison the Well, following their split 12" vinyl with Promise No Tomorrow (released under the name An Acre Lost in early 1998) and a demo tape sold during the band's summer 1998 tour. The demo tape featured a selection of songs from this recording session, which is in turn a re-recording of the songs previously released on their split with Promise No Tomorrow. It was first released via Good Life Recordings in September 1998.

The EP was reissued, with the shortened title Distance Makes the Heart Grow Fonder (dropping the word "only" from the title), through Undecided Records on April 24, 2001. The reissue contains the original five studio recordings and two bonus live songs featuring Poison the Well's summer 2000 line-up. The two live tracks were recorded at a radio broadcast on the morning of June 26, 2000 in Boston, Massachusetts. Studio recordings of the two bonus tracks can be found on The Opposite of December... A Season of Separation.

In promotion of the EP, Poison the Well toured the United States twice between June 1998 and January 1999, both times accompanied by Twelve Tribes. Poison the Well also performed at the Connecticut Hardcore Festival in Bristol, Connecticut and at Eulogyfest in Davie, Florida. Distance Only Makes the Heart Grow Fonder was recorded in May 1998 with lead vocalists Aryeh Lehrere and Duane Hosein, lead guitarist Ryan Primack, rhythm guitarist Russel Saunders, bassist Andrew Abramowitz and drummer Christopher Hornbrook. Saunders and Abramowitz subsequently quit the band following Poison the Well's summer 1998 tour and their credits were stricken from the booklet in retaliation. Instead, bassist Jeronimo Gomez and rhythm guitarist Derek Miller were credited. Shortly after the release, Hosein was replaced by vocalist Alan Landsman, who ultimately switched to playing bass after Gomez departed. Jeffrey Moreira came in at the end of 1998 in time for the band's second tour.

== Recording ==
An Acre Lost entered Studio 13 in Deerfield Park, Florida in early 1998 to record material with producer Jeremy Staska for their first release. The band was then composed of lead vocalists Aryeh Lehrer and Duane Hosein, lead guitarist Ryan Primack, rhythm guitarist Russel Saunders, bassist Andrew Abramowitz and drummer Dennis Pase. The five songs recorded in early 1998 included "Left With Nothing", "Lost in Silence", "Torn", "Obstacle" and "Jesus Drove a Cadillac", and were released by Ohev Records on a split 12" vinyl with Key Largo, Florida-based metalcore band Promise No Tomorrow (which featured members that would go on to play in the band Glasseater) in the early spring of 1998. A compact disc version of the split was scheduled to be released through Eulogy Recordings in the early summer of 1998 but was held back when the band, unhappy with the production of their first recording session, announced plans to fully re-record it.

In early May 1998, Pase departed, leading to the band's former drummer, Christopher Hornbrook, to rejoin Poison the Well (Pase had replaced Hornbrook in the autumn of 1997). Pase went on to play in the emo band Forever and a Day which was quickly signed to Eulogy Recordings. From May 25–28, 1998, An Acre Lost returned to Studio 13 to re-record the same five songs for their Eulogy Recordings release Distance Only Makes the Heart Grow Fonder. Three of the songs retained their original titles but "Left With Nothing" was retitled "Grain of Salt (What's the Use of Having a Heart)" and "Jesus Drove a Cadillac" was retitled "Material Christ". The intro found on "Grain of Salt (What's the Use of Having a Heart)" was taken from the 1995 film Angus.

== Release and packaging ==
Eulogy Recordings ended up passing on the release, but pitched it up to Belgian record label Good Life Recordings, which Eulogy Recordings was exclusively distributing in the United States. Before the recording was completed, Good Life Recordings had already accepted to release it.

In June 1998, shortly before leaving on their first tour, An Acre Lost changed name to Poison the Well, a name suggested by Hosein and influenced by the popular rhetorical device. As their forthcoming EP Distance Only Makes the Heart Grow Fonder would not be ready until later that summer, the band made demo tapes to sell on their upcoming tour. The Demo 98 tapes were packaged in white envelopes and featured two songs from the May 1998 recording session: "Grain of Salt (What's the Use of Having a Heart)" and "Obstacle". It was the band's first release to bare the name Poison the Well and was limited to 100 hand-numbered copies.

Abramowitz and Saunders left the band after the tour and were replaced by Jeronimo Gomez and Derek Miller. With Gomez and Miller in the band, Poison the Well hastily contacted Good Life Recordings in August 1998 with instructions to remove Saunders and Abramowitz's names from the forthcoming Distance Only Makes the Heart Grow Fonder booklet and substitute them with the names of their replacements. The pictures used inside the booklet were however left unchanged and still represented the line-up at the time of the recording (with Abramowitz and Saunders). Distance Only Makes the Heart Grow Fonder was finally released by Good Life Recordings on compact disc and 10" vinyl in September 1998, under catalog number GL031. The vinyl pressing was available on a choice of blue vinyl (limited to 200 copies) and black vinyl (limited to 1000 copies). The vinyl was repressed by Good Life Recordings in late 2001 (at the same time as a repress of The Opposite of December... A Season of Separation) on black vinyl (limited to 700 copies) and peach orange marbled (limited to 300 copies).

It was announced in August 2000 that Poison the Well would be doing two releases with Florida-based record label Undecided Records. The first of these releases was to be a reissue the band's EP Distance Only Makes the Heart Grow Fonder for the American market. The reissue was retitled Distance Makes the Heart Grow Fonder (dropping the word only) and had a new artwork and layout designed by Converge vocalist Jacob Banonn, newly-written liner notes, and was bundled with two bonus live tracks recorded at a radio broadcast in Boston, Massachusetts on the morning of June 26, 2000: "A Wish for Wings that Work" and "Artist's Rendering of Me". The reissue was originally meant to include all three live tracks that were performed at the radio show, but only two were used. Studio recordings of the two bonus tracks can be found on The Opposite of December... A Season of Separation. The Undecided Records reissue was originally scheduled to be released in late March 2001 but was pushed back to April 24, 2001. Bassist Alan Landsman and rhythm guitarist Matthew Tackett, who were part of Poison the Well at the time of the radio performance, were uncredited in the booklet.

The Undecided Records reissue did very well and warranted a second compact disc pressing in June 2004. The record label stopped releasing music in physical editions in early 2006 but went on to release all of its back catalog digitally in 2007. Distance Makes the Heart Grow Fonder was released digitally on March 29, 2007.

== Promotion ==
Poison the Well's summer 1998 tour was originally scheduled to be with Indiana-based metalcore band Upheaval, which had just released their debut EP Downfall of the Ascendancy of Man in April 1998 through Eulogy Recordings. Upheaval was replaced by Ohio-based metalcore band Twelve Tribes, which was later signed to Eulogy Recordings, and Ontario-based metalcore band Confine on select dates. Like Poison the Well, Twelve Tribes was also touring in promotion of a demo tape, their second release, Two Cleft Tongues.

The tour took the bands up the Northeast and Midwest of the United States, then back to Florida from late June to early July 1998. Halfway through their tour, rhythm guitarist Saunders became sick and unable to perform and was forced to fly back home to Florida. The band performed the rest of the tour as a five-piece with no rhythm guitarist. Upon returning home, the band parted ways with Saunders and bassist Abramowitz. Saunders went on to play in the bands Promise No Tomorrow, Boddicker and AC Cobra; while Abramowitz went on to play in the bands Junction 18, Unearth, Drowningman, Escapist, The Distance, Do You Still Hate Me and Building.

Bassist Jeronimo Gomez, who had previously played in As Friends Rust, Wayside and Red Letter Day, quickly joined Poison the Well, but the band had difficulty finding a rhythm guitarist. Abramowitz was asked to return and fill in as rhythm guitarist at concerts while the band auditioned new members. On August 5, 1998, Lehrer and Abramowitz attended Warped Tour 1998 at the Pompano Beach Amphitheatre, where they met 17 year old guitarist Derek Miller. Miller was already a fan of Poison the Well and asked to audition as their new rhythm guitarist.

Meanwhile, Primack joined Eulogy Recordings founder John Wylie's new band, Where Fear and Weapons Meet, as their bassist, performing shows during Poison the Well's downtime. Hosein departed in the early fall of 1998 and went on to form the metalcore band A Jealousy Issue, and later played with Hoor-Paar-Kraat. He was replaced by vocalist Alan Landsman who, after a single show, switched to playing bass when Gomez departed. Gomez went on to play in The Rocking Horse Winner and The Darling Fire. Jeffrey Moreira, a Cuban emigrant, came in to fill the vacant second vocalist position. Moreira came to the band's attention when his hardcore band Defy played Eulogyfest with Poison the Well on November 28, 1998, at Club Q in Davie, Florida.

Poison the Well embarked on a second tour with Twelve Tribes, taking them again through the Northeast and Midwest during December 1998 and January 1999. This was the band's first tour properly promoting Distance Only Makes the Heart Grow Fonder, as CDs and records had not been released at the time of their first tour. Upon returning home, Lehrer quit the band and went on to join the hardcore band Foolproof as their second guitarist. Moreira would from this point on remain the band's sole vocalist.

== Track listing ==
Credits are adapted from the album's liner notes.

| No. | Title | Lyrics | Music | Length |
|---|---|---|---|---|
| 1. | "Grain of Salt (What's the Use of Having a Heart)" | Hosein | Primack; Hornbrook; Saunders | 3:25 |
| 2. | "Lost In Silence" | Lehrer | Primack; Hornbrook; Saunders | 2:49 |
| 3. | "Torn" | Lehrer | Primack; Hornbrook; Saunders | 3:22 |
| 4. | "Obstacle" | Lehrer | Primack; Hornbrook; Saunders | 3:47 |
| 5. | "Material Christ" | Primack | Primack; Hornbrook; Saunders | 2:56 |
| Total length: | | | | 17:59 |

Reissue bonus tracks
| No. | Title | Lyrics | Music | Length |
|---|---|---|---|---|
| 6. | "A Wish for Wings that Work (Live)" | Moreira | Primack; Hornbrook; Miller | 4:27 |
| 7. | "Artist's Rendering of Me (Live)" | Moreira | Primack; Hornbrook | 3:30 |
| Total length: | | | | 24:16 |

== Personnel ==
Credits are adapted from the album's liner notes.

Poison the Well (tracks 1 – 5)

- Aryeh Lehrer – lead vocals
- Duane Hosein – lead vocals
- Ryan Primack – lead guitar
- Russel Saunders – rhythm guitar (on recording)
- Derek Miller – rhythm guitar (credit only)
- Andrew Abramowitz - bass guitar (on recording)
- Jeronimo Gomez – bass guitar (credit only)
- Christopher Hornbrook – drums

Poison the Well (tracks 6 & 7)

- Jeffrey Moreira – lead vocals
- Ryan Primack – lead guitar
- Matthew Tackett – rhythm guitar (on recording)
- Derek Miller – rhythm guitar (credit only)
- Alan Landsman – bass (on recording)
- Christopher Hornbrook – drums

Production

- Jeremy Staska – recording engineer, mixer and producer at Studio 13
- Poison the Well – co-producer
- Edward Verhaeghe – art direction and design
- Onno Hesselink – art direction and design
- Jacob Bannon – art direction and design at Atomic! Information Design (reissue)
