= I/III / II/III / III/III =

- Cover art for the CD release compiling all three EPs. Though similar, it's not the same as the art found on the individual EPs.

EP series by Poison the Well
- Released: November 2008 – May 2009
- Recorded: 2005–2006 during the Versions sessions
- Genre: Post-hardcore
- Length: 18:39
- Label: Ferret Music
- Producer: Eskil Lövström, Pelle Henricsson

Poison the Well chronology
Versions (2007)	I/III / II/III / III/III (2008)	The Tropic Rot (2009)

Individual covers
- All three EPs combined together to create a larger image. The band's logo spreads across all three covers.

I/III / II/III / III/III (pronounced as One of Three, Two of Three, Three of Three) is a limited edition set of three 7″ vinyl records by post-hardcore band Poison the Well. The collection features three EPs released both physically and digitally that contain songs written and recorded for the band's fourth studio album Versions, but were never released. The three EPs were released throughout the recording process of Poison the Well's following studio album, The Tropic Rot, which was released on July 7, 2009.

== Album information ==
During the recording sessions for Poison the Well's fourth studio album, Versions, the band recorded more than enough songs than were necessary for one full album. After the release of Versions, Poison the Well had considered releasing the extra songs in a special way, however nothing had materialized until late 2008 when the band came up with the idea of a limited edition pressing on vinyl. The EPs in the series were released over the recording period of their fifth studio album, later to be known as The Tropic Rot. All songs from I/III / II/III / III/III were also made available as bonus tracks on digital retail versions of The Tropic Rot.

Each release in the series contains two tracks, and could be obtained both physically in the form of a 7″ vinyl record or digitally from online digital retail stores. Physical copies could only be purchased at concerts or from online webstores for mail order. Physical copies are limited, although exact quantities are unknown. The cover art of the three individual releases can combine to create a larger image altogether. A secret message is revealed once all the albums are combined.

In a limited run of 2,000 copies, all three EPs were also released on one CD containing all six songs. The CD was released as a Record Store Day exclusive, and could only be obtained at participating independent record stores across the United States. The IIII section represents change within unions for royalty

== Track listings ==
All songs were written by Poison the Well. The limited edition CD features all six songs in this order.

=== I/III ===
1. "New Fast" – 2:11
2. "Purple Sabbath" – 4:52

=== II/III ===
1. "Shuffle" – 3:20
2. "Bowie" – 4:40

=== III/III ===
1. "A#No.1" – 2:35
2. "Run Desire Gone Clean" – 1:02

== Release history ==
Release date	Album	Format	Quantity	Catalog
November 11, 2008	I/III	7″ vinyl, digital download	Limited – quantity unknown	Ferret – F115
January 20, 2009	II/III	7″ vinyl, digital download	Limited – quantity unknown	Ferret – F119
April 18, 2009	I/III / II/III / III/III	Compact disc	2,000 copies	Ferret – F124
May 19, 2009	III/III	7″ vinyl, digital download	Limited – quantity unknown	TBA

== Personnel ==
Poison the Well

- Jeff Moreira – vocals
- Ryan Primack – guitar
- Chris Hornbrook – drums
- Jason Boyer – guitar
- Ben Brown – bass

Production and art

- Produced by Pelle Henricsson and Eskil Louström
- Mixed and mastered by Pelle Henricsson and Tonteknik
- Layout by Brad Clifford
