= Hemlock (band) =

American heavy metal band

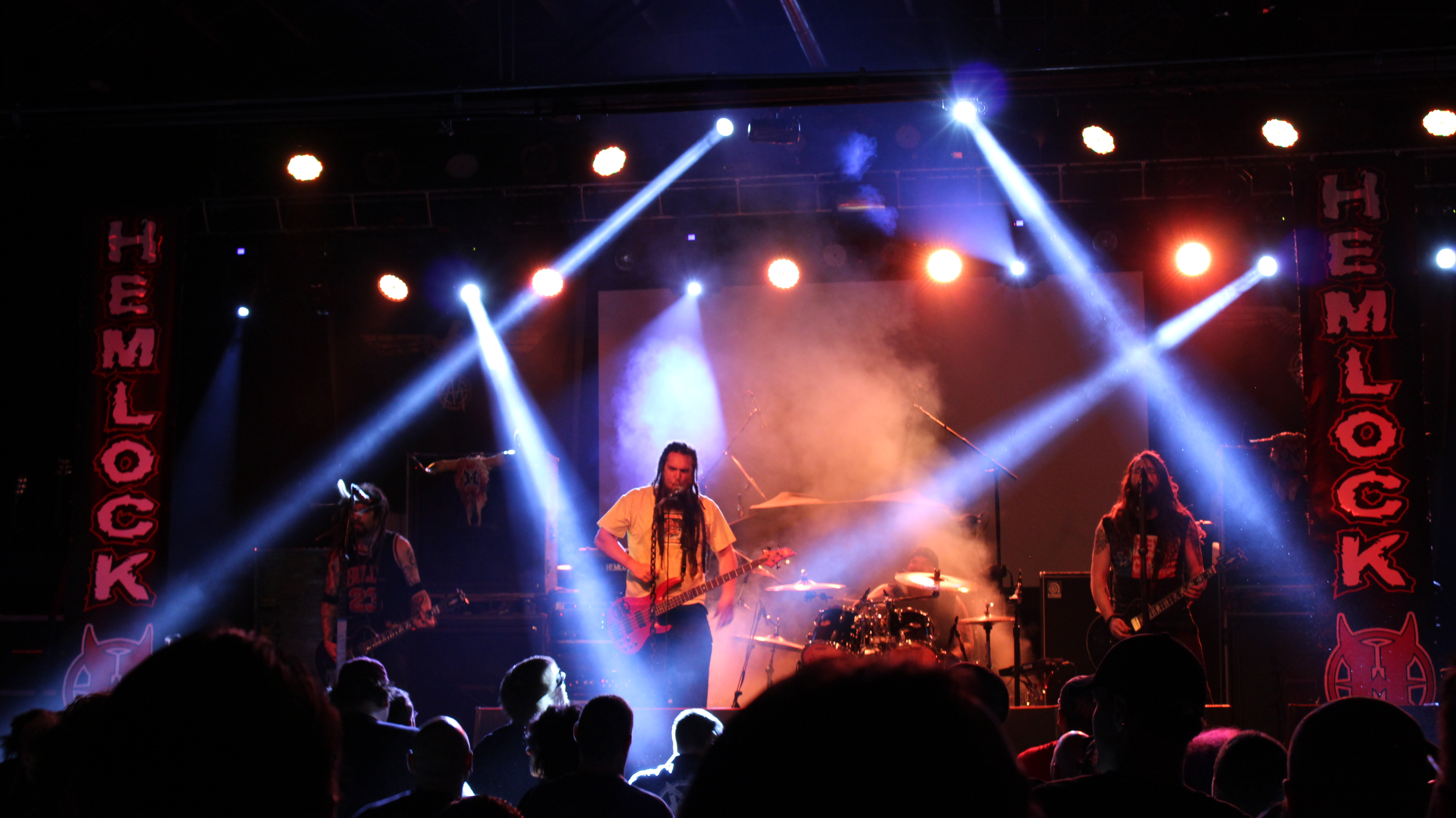
- Hemlock performing in 2016

Background information
- Origin: Las Vegas, Nevada, U.S.
- Genres: Thrash metal, groove metal
- Years active: 1993–present
- Label: Independent
- Members: Chad Smith; Jerad Johnson; Brian Smith; Jezy Ward extra touring Bryan Gentry extra touring James Gelber extra touring Brandon Wiebke
- Website: hemlockworld.com

Hemlock is an American heavy metal band from Las Vegas, Nevada, formed in 1993.

== History ==
Hemlock were founded in 1993 by Chad and Brian Smith in Las Vegas. A prolific touring band, they have performed multiple national tours, as well as international tours. They have performed as an opening act for groups such as Slayer, Slipknot, Ministry, Meshuggah, Trivium, and Lamb of God.

Following a two year pause in touring, the band released two albums, KARMAgeDDOoN and Violence & Victory, in 2021. The two albums were mixed and mastered by producer and former Machine Head guitar player Logan Mader.

== Discography ==
- Controlance (1996)
- Shut Down (1999)
- Pigeonholed (2001)
- Bleed the Dream (2004)
- No Time for Sorrow (2008)
- Back in the Day (compilation album) (2012)
- The Only Enemy (2012)
- Viva 'Lock Vegas (live album) (2013)
- Mouth of the Swine (2015)
- XXV (2018)
- Violence & Victory (2021)
- Karmageddon (2021)

== Band members ==
- Chad Smith – lead vocals, bass
- Brian Smith – drums, percussion
- Jerad Johnson – guitar, backing vocals
- Jezy Ward – guitar, backing vocals
