= Big Black Delta (album) =

Studio album by Big Black Delta
- Released: June 4, 2013
- Genres: Electronic, indie rock
- Length: 55:31
- Label: Master of Bates

Big Black Delta chronology
BBDLP1 (2011)	Big Black Delta (2013)	Trágame Tierra (2016)

Professional ratings
Aggregate scores
Source	Rating
Metacritic	65/100
Review scores
Source	Rating
MusicOMH	4/5 stars
Under the Radar	7.5/10

Big Black Delta is the album of Mellowdrone vocalist Jonathan Bates' solo project Big Black Delta. It was released in June 2013 under Master of Bates Records.

== Track list ==
No.	Title	Length
1.	"Put the Gun on the Floor"	3:40
2.	"Side of the Road"	4:39
3.	"Huggin & Kissin"	4:25
4.	"Capsize"	4:53
5.	"Money Rain Down"	4:31
6.	"Betamax"	4:34
7.	"The Zebrah"	2:53
8.	"IFUCKINGLOVEYOU"	5:08
9.	"x22"	2:12
10.	"Dreary Moon"	4:54
11.	"PB3"	5:52
12.	"Into the Night"	3:51
13.	"Love You This Summer"	3:59

iTunes bonus track
No.	Title	Length
14.	"Ghostrider"	3:41
15.	"The Zebrah (Accelra Remix)"	4:38
