= Big Black Delta =

American musician

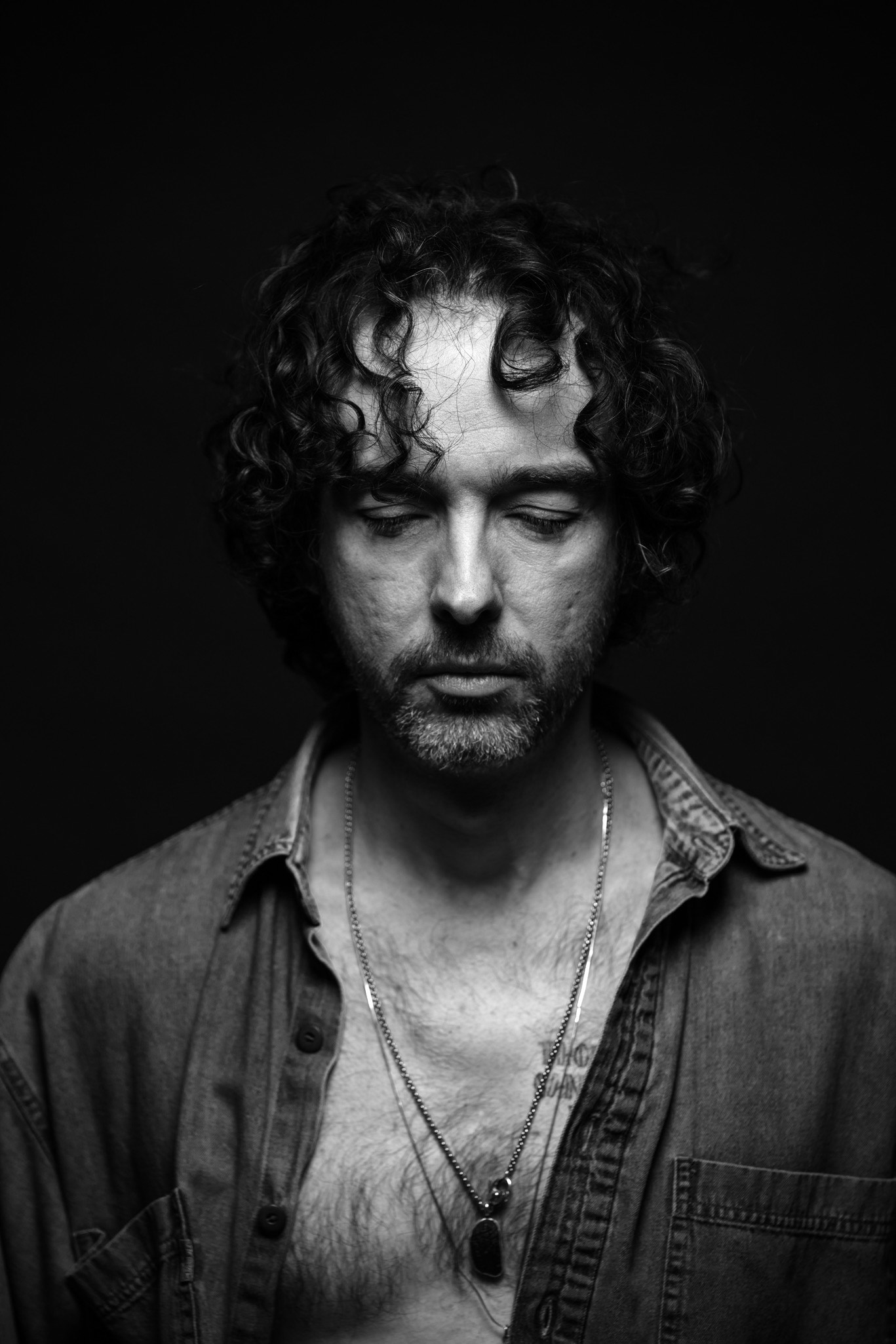
- Bates in 2020

Background information
- Origin: Los Angeles, U.S.
- Genres: Electronic rock; synthpop; industrial rock; electro; post-industrial; space rock
- Years active: 2010–present
- Labels: Master of Bates
- Member of: Mellowdrone
- Members: Jonathan Bates
- Website: bigblackdelta.com

Big Black Delta is a solo project by Mellowdrone vocalist/bassist Jonathan Bates.

== History ==
Bates began the project in 2010, after becoming frustrated with the logistics of a band. Thanks to help from Alessandro Cortini of Nine Inch Nails, he discovered the possibilities of producing music on a laptop and set about building a new sound.

In 2013, Bates released his debut album, Big Black Delta, which contained a mix of fresh material and songs released on an early-release, limited-edition of the record, titled BBDLP1. The album was issued on Bates' own label, Masters of Bates, and was inspired by the soundtracks of the films Blade Runner and Solaris. It was positively received by critics and was compared by one reviewer to music from Muse and the Joy Formidable. Remixes of songs from the album have since come from Jimmy Edgar, John Tejada, Azari & III, and Martyn. The video for "Side of the Road", directed by Warren Kommers, was inspired by Bates' love of astrophysics and astronomy.

Big Black Delta has collaborated with a number of other artists, such as War Widow, Alessandro Cortini, Susanne Sundfør, and Morgan Kibby, and played in support of Gary Numan, M83, and Jane's Addiction on their respective tours. The project has received praise from Jay Z on his blog, Life+Times.

In 2016, Big Black Delta released his second album, Trágame Tierra. It was financed via PledgeMusic, a music-focused crowdfunding website, which allowed Bates to issue the album independently. It includes collaborations with Debbie Gibson on "RCVR" and Kimbra on "Bitten by the Apple". It was supported by a North American headlining tour.

Big Black Delta's third album, the all-instrumental WHORU812, was released on eOne Music Canada in June 2017. Prior to its publication, Bates announced he would do only one live performance in 2017, at the Viaduct in Los Angeles.

The songs "Huggin & Kissin" and "Capsize" were used in the 2017 USA Network show The Sinner.

On January 31, 2020, Bates and fellow Los Angeles band Sego (who previously toured in support of Big Black Delta) released a split cover EP called Quid Pro Quo, which saw Sego covering the Big Black Delta song "Into the Night," and Bates covering Sego's "Shame".

On March 20, 2020, Big Black Delta released the single "Summoner", from his upcoming fourth album. It was accompanied by a music video directed by Warren Kommers and Nina McNeely. The track was later remixed by James Welsh, Clearside, and the Bodies Obtained. On May 15, 2020, Big Black Delta announced the upcoming release of the album 4 on July 10 and issued the single "Lord Only Knows", with an accompanying music video, directed by Adam Osgood. On June 12, "Canary", the third single from 4, came out.

Big Black Delta had two original songs featured on the soundtrack for the 2020 film Bill & Ted Face the Music.

== Discography ==
Studio albums

- BBDLP1 (early release of Big Black Delta, 2011)
- Big Black Delta (2013)
- Trágame Tierra (2016)
- WHORU812 (2017)
- 4 (2020)
- Reworks Vol. 1 (Acoustic) (2024)
- ADONAI (2025)

EPs

- BBDEP1 (2010)
- EP2.5A7 (2013)
- Quid Pro Quo (2020) (split with Sego)

Singles

- "He's a Whore" (with War Widow) (2010)
- "IFUCKINGLOVEYOU" (2012)
- "Side of the Road" (2013)
- "Money Rain Down" (2013)
- "Huggin & Kissin" (2014)
- "It's OK" (2015)
- "RCVR (feat. Debbie Gibson)" (2015)
- "Steer the Canyon" (2016)
- "Bitten by the Apple" (feat. Kimbra) (2016)
- "Brooks was here2a" (2017)
- "Roost" (2019)
- "Orinoco Symphony" (2019)
- "Summoner" (2020)
- "Lord Only Knows" (2020)
- "Canary" (2020)

Music videos

- "IFUCKINGLOVEYOU" (2010)
- "Betamax" (2011)
- "Side of the Road" (2013)
- "x22 (2013)
- "Money Rain Down" (2013)
- "Love You This Summer" (2013)
- "Huggin & Kissin" (2014)
- "Bitten by the Apple" (2016)
- "Summoner" (2020)
- "Lord Only Knows" (2020)
- "Canary" (2020)
- "Vessel" (2020)

Remixes

- "Houdini" by SONOIO on NON SONOIO (2010)
- "Fall" (with M83) by Daft Punk on Tron: Legacy Reconfigured (2011)
- "Inflammable Heart" by Man Without Country on a 3-track single bundle (2011)
- "Midnight City (Big Black Delta Remix)" by M83 on Midnight City Remix EP (2011)
- "Make It Home (Big Black Delta Remix)" by thenewno2, from their album thefearofmissingout (2012)
- "More Human than Human (Big Black Delta Remix)" by White Zombie / Rob Zombie on Mondo Sex Head (2012)
- "Dear Brother (Denton rework)" by Puscifer, on the "Donkey Punch the Night" EP (2013)
