= Shai Hulud discography =

- Studio albums: 4
- Extended plays: 2
- Soundtrack albums: 0
- Live albums: 0
- Compilation albums: 2
- Tribute albums: 1
- Singles: 1
- Video albums: 1
- Music videos: 2
- Splits: 4
- Demos: 3

The discography of Shai Hulud, a hardcore punk band from Pompano Beach, Florida consists of 4 studio albums, 3 split albums, 2 compilation albums, 1 extended plays, 1 single and 1 video album.

== Studio albums ==
Date of Release	Title	Label	Format	Peak chart positions	Notes
November 4, 1997	Hearts Once Nourished with Hope and Compassion	Crisis, Revelation	Original: CD, LP; Reissue : CD, LP, Picture disc	n/a	Debut full length, reissued on August 6, 2006 through Revelation Records
May 20, 2003	That Within Blood Ill-Tempered	Revelation	CD, LP, Picture disc	#39 (Billboard Independent Album chart)	First and unique full length released with Geert van der Velde on vocals
May 26, 2008 (Europe); May 27, 2008 (US)	Misanthropy Pure	Metal Blade	CD, LP	#35 (Billboard Independent Album chart) #12 (Billboard Top Heatseekers chart)	First release on Metal Blade records.
February 15, 2013 (Europe); February 19, 2013 (US)	Reach Beyond the Sun	Metal Blade	CD, LP	#52 (Billboard Independent Albums Chart) #12 (Billboard Top Heatseekers chart) #22 (Billboard Current Hard Music Albums Chart) #38 (Billboard Hard Music Albums Chart) #62 (Canada Hard Music Charts)	

== Extended plays ==
Date of release	Title	Label	Notes
February 18, 1997	A Profound Hatred of Man	Crisis, Revelation	EP remastered & reissued on August 29, 2006 in the A Profound Hatred of Man: Shrapnel Inc. compilation, through Revelation Records, including songs from splits, compilations and b-sides.
December 4, 2015	Just Can't Hate Enough x2 - Plus Other Hate Songs	No Sleep Revelation	

== Singles ==
Date of release	Title	Label
May 24, 2008	"Misanthropy Pure"	Metal Blade
December 10, 2012	"Reach Beyond the Sun"	Metal Blade

== Splits ==
Date of release	Title	Label	Notes
September 15, 1998	The Fall of Every Man	Crisis	Split with Indecision, Shai Hulud's songs were included and remastered in the A Profound Hatred of Man: Shrapnel Inc. compilation
June 27, 2000	A Whole New Level of Sickness	Trustkill	Split with Another Victim, Shai Hulud's songs were included in the A Profound Hatred of Man: Shrapnel Inc. compilation
March 24, 2000	Crush 'Em All Vol. 1	Undecided	Split with Boy Sets Fire, Metallica tribute compilation. Shai Hulud's song Damage Inc. was included in the A Profound Hatred of Man: Shrapnel Inc. compilation.
March 2003	Shai Hulud/Since By Man Sampler	Revelation	Split/Sampler with Since By Man. Shai Hulud's songs "This Song: For the True and Passionate Lovers of Music" and "Two And Twenty Misfortunes" were released on That Within Blood Ill-Tempered.
March 25, 2009 - May 29, 2009	Not Without a Heart Once Nourished by Sticks and Stones Within Blood Ill-Tempered Misanthropy Pure Gold Can Stay	Bridge 9	Limited edition tour split EP with New Found Glory.

== Compilations ==
Date of release	Title	Label	Notes
January 25, 2005	A Comprehensive Retrospective: or How We Learned to Stop Worrying and Release Bad and Useless Recordings	Revelation/At Dawn We Wage War	Includes the 1995 demo, 1996 demo, band practices, guitar tracks and live performances.
August 29, 2006	A Profound Hatred of Man: Shrapnel Inc.	Revelation	Includes a remastered version of A Profound Hatred of Man, The Fall of Every Man, A Whole New Level of Sickness, Crush 'Em All Vol. 1, covers and b-sides.

== Video albums ==
Date of release	Title	Label
TBA	Pray Not a Fallen Banner	Revelation, 3bStudios

== Demos ==
Recorded	Title	Notes
1995	Original Shai Hulud Demo (also called 1995 demo)	The original Shai Hulud demo with Damien Moyal (vocals), Matt Fox (guitar), Steve Kleisath (drums), Oliver Chapoy (guitar) and Dave Silber (Bass). The demo was released on the A Comprehensive Retrospective: or How We Learned to Stop Worrying and Release Bad and Useless Recordings compilation. This demo was sent to Revelation Records. Track listing: 1. Hardly – 3:11; 2. Orwell – 2:13; 3. Unlearned – 2:08; 4. Sauve Qui Peut – 2:38 (For the World); 5. This Wake I Myself Have Stirred – 2:45; 6. Favor – 3:04 (Beyond Man)
1996	1996 Demo	First recording with Chad Gilbert on vocals. Track listing: 1. For The World - 3:02; 2. This Wake I Myself Have Stirred - 2:54; 3. Hardly - 3:28
2006	Great Worm (also called Metal Blade Demo or simply 2006 Demo)	With Eric Dellon on vocals, and Geert van der Velde on backup vocals. Probably released with "The Warmth Of Red Blood" moniker. This demo was sent to Metal Blade Records. Track listing: 1. To Bear the Brunt of Many Blades - 3:45; 2. We Who Finish Last (By Moonlight A Funeral) - 3:15; 3. If A Mountain be my Obstacle - 3:22

== Appearances ==
Date of Release	Title	Label	Track
1998	West Coast Hardcore vs. East Coast Hardcore	Ambassador Records, Equal Vision Records, Indecision Records, Mankind Records, Revelation, and Simba Records.	"This Wake I Myself Have Stirred" (track 23, from Hearts Once Nourished with Hope and Compassion)
1999	For The Kids!	Revelation	"The Bonds of Those Who Have No Understanding of Consequence" (track 16, from The Fall of Every Man)
August 29, 1999	Never Give In: A Tribute to Bad Brains	Century Media	"Fearless Vampire Killers" (Bad Brains cover, track 15)
1999	Revelation Records 1999 Summer Sampler	Revelation	"Love is The Fall of Every Man" (track 5, from The Fall of Every Man)
1999	Undevoured.com Compilation 2000	Undevoured Records	"Set Your Body Ablaze" (track 15, from A Whole New Level of Sickness)
2000	Trustkill Family Tree 2000	Trustkill, Goodlife Records	"Anesthesia" (track 15, from A Whole New Level of Sickness, Bad Religion cover)
2000	Revelation Records Sampler 2000	Revelation	"Solely Concentrating on the Negative Aspects of Life" (track 11, from Hearts Once Nourished with Hope and Compassion)
November 29, 1999	For Those Who Stand	Tear It Down Records	"When One Bests Defeat" (track 6, from The Fall of Every Man)
April, 2001	Tomorrow Seems so Hopeless	Eyeball	"Lost Cause" (Negative Approach cover, track 1)
June 1, 2001	Too Brilliant to Hold Back	Brickland Records	"Anesthesia" (track 15, from A Whole New Level of Sickness, Bad Religion cover)
June 6, 2001	Hellfest	Trustkill	"My Heart Bleeds the Darkest Blood" (Live VHS, DVD Title 4 Chapter 5) "Solely Concentrating On The Negative Aspects Of Life"(Live VHS, DVD Title 4 Chapter 39) "A Profound Hatred of Man" (Live DVD Title 2 Chapter 10)
August 1, 2001	Plea For Peace/Take Action	Hopeless and Sub City	"Sauve Qui Peut" (track 13, from the original Shai Hulud 1995 Demo)
March 12, 2002	Trustkill Records: The Future Of Music	Trustkill	"Set Your Body Ablaze" (track 11, from A Whole New Level of Sickness)
March 25, 2002	Planet of Punks Vol. 2	Straight Ahead Records	"Linoleum" (track 6 CD 2, from A Whole New Level of Sickness, NOFX cover)
May 7, 2002	Revelation 100	Revelation	"Faithless is He Who Says Farewell When The Road Darkens" (track 3)
June, 2002	Revelation Records Sampler 2002	Revelation	"When One Bests Defeat" (track 11, from The Fall of Every Man)
August, 2002	It's Florida Time	ADD Records	"Love is The Fall of Every Man" (track 18, from The Fall of Every Man)
August 15, 2003	Furnace Fest 2002	3B Studios	"For the World", "Set Your Body Ablaze", "A Profound Hatred of Man" (Live DVD Title 1 Chapter 9)
September 9, 2003	Take Action! Volume 3	Sub City	"Given Flight By Demon's Wings" (track 15, from That Within Blood Ill-Tempered)
October 10, 2003	Orange County New York vs. Orange County California	Orange Peal Records and SmellMyThumb Records	"Set Your Body Ablaze" (track 13 from A Whole New Level of Sickness)
November 4, 2003	go-kart MP300 Raceway	go-kart Records	"This Song: For the True and Passionate Lovers of Music" (track 45) Two And Twenty Misfortunes (track 46, from That Within Blood Ill-Tempered on mp3 format)
December, 2003	Trial & Error 3: Punk Metal Hardcore Sampler	Trial & Error Records	"This Song: For the True and Passionate Lovers of Music" (track 8, from That Within Blood Ill-Tempered)
December 16, 2003	Hellfest 2002	High Roller Studios	"Set Your Body Ablaze" (Live DVD Title 4 Chapter 21)
March 23, 2004	New England Metal & Hardcore Festival 2003	Trustkill	"A Profound Hatred of Man" (Live DVD Title 1 Chapter 24)
May 9, 2004	Revelation Records 2004 Collection	Revelation	"This Song: For the True and Passionate Lovers of Music" (track 5, from That Within Blood Ill-Tempered)
January 21, 2005	The Old, the New, the Unreleased	Undecided	"Damage, Inc." (track 16 from Crush 'em All Vol. 1)
February 10, 2006	The Way It Goes in the Middle of Europe: the Hardcore Compilation	Oath Records	"Solely Concentrating on the Negative Aspects of Life", "This Song: For the True and Passionate Lovers of Music" (Live DVD).
2006	In-Flight: No-Slam! Revelation Records Collection '06	Revelation	"Solely Concentrating On The Negative Aspects Of Life" (track 15, from Hearts Once Nourished with Hope and Compassion)
January 15, 2008	Metal Blade Records 25th Anniversary	Metal Blade	"A Profound Hatred of Man" (Live DVD, Title 3 Chapter 8)

== Music videos ==
- My Heart Bleeds the Darkest Blood, 1997 Crisis/Revelation Records
- Misanthropy Pure, 2008 Metal Blade Records
- Colder Than The Cold World, 2015 No Sleep Records
