= My Heart Bleeds the Darkest Blood =

Song by band Shai Hulud

Single by Shai Hulud

from the album Hearts Once Nourished with Hope and Compassion
- Released: 1997
- Recorded: August–September 1997
- Studio: Morrisound Recording, Tampa, Florida
- Genre: Hardcore punk, metalcore
- Length: 2:05
- Label: Crisis, Revelation
- Songwriters: Matt Fox, Oliver Chapoy
- Producer: Jeremy Staska

Shai Hulud singles chronology
"My Heart Bleeds the Darkest Blood" (1997)	"Misanthropy Pure" (2008)

"My Heart Bleeds the Darkest Blood" is a song from the hardcore punk band Shai Hulud from their debut album Hearts Once Nourished with Hope and Compassion. It is considered one of their most recognizable songs and is a live staple. The song was written in one night. The opening guitar riff was a direct result of the sadness everyone felt due to Oliver Chapoy's mother dying.

The sample played before the song starts (on Solely Concentrating on the Negative Aspects of Life) is Bill Murray saying "It's gonna be cold. It's gonna be gray. And it's gonna last you for the rest of your life." in Groundhog Day (1993).

The lyric, "A rock feels no pain," is inspired by Simon & Garfunkel's 1965 song, "I Am A Rock."

A music video was made for the song in 1997. Video on YouTube

Brian Fair of Overcast & Shadows Fall and Jerry Villarroel of Morning Again made an appearance in the video.
