= A Profound Hatred of Man =

Extended play by Shai Hulud

EP by Shai Hulud
- Released: February 18, 1997
- Recorded: 1996
- Genres: Metalcore, hardcore punk
- Length: 8:43
- Labels: Crisis, Revelation
- Producer: Shai Hulud

Shai Hulud chronology
1995 Demo (1995)	A Profound Hatred of Man (1997)	Hearts Once Nourished with Hope and Compassion (1997)

A Profound Hatred of Man: Shrapnel Inc.

Compilation album by Shai Hulud
- Released: August 29, 2006
- Recorded: 1996–2003
- Genres: Hardcore punk, metalcore
- Length: 37:18
- Label: Revelation
- Producer: Shai Hulud

Shai Hulud chronology
A Comprehensive Retrospective: or How We Learned to Stop Worrying and Release Bad and Useless Recordings (2005)	A Profound Hatred of Man: Shrapnel Inc. (2006)	Misanthropy Pure (2008)

A Profound Hatred of Man is an extended play by hardcore punk band Shai Hulud, released on February 18, 1997, on the independent label Crisis Records. In 2006, Revelation Records released a remastered version of the album which also includes the material from all of Shai Hulud's split records with bands Indecision, Boy Sets Fire and Another Victim, and some B-sides and covers.

On the first 5000 copies, Shai Hulud's name is misspelled on the spine as "Shai Halud", but appears correctly on the cover.

In "If Born From This Soil", the lyric "A likeness only in structure, not in mind" came into his mind when an impatient, drunk man spoke for Matt Fox, while he was waiting in a long line at a gas station. The man said to the cashier while gesturing to himself and Matt, "We just want a beer." The sample at the beginning of the song is Al Pacino in Glengarry Glen Ross (1992). Some other samples played are Kurt Russell in The Thing (1982) in "The Bonds of Those Who Have No Understanding of Consequences" ("Trust is a tough thing to come by these days.") and Siân Phillips in Dune (1984) in "Set Your Body Ablaze" ("Heat, upon heat, upon heat.")

== Track listing ==
Credits are adapted from the album's liner notes.

A Profound Hatred of Man track listing
No.	Title	Lyrics	Music	Length
1.	"Hardly"	Moyal	Fox; Kleisath; Silber	3:21
2.	"If Born from This Soil"	Fox	Fox; Kleisath	2:27
3.	"For the World"	Moyal	Fox; Kleisath; Silber	2:57
Total length:				8:46

A Profound Hatred of Man – reissue bonus tracks
No.	Title	Lyrics	Music	Length
4.	"The Bonds of Those Who Have No Understanding of Consequence" (originally released on The Fall of Every Man)	Fox	Fox; Kleisath; Silber	2:29
5.	"Love Is the Fall of Every Man" (originally released on The Fall of Every Man)	Fox; Gilbert	Fox; Kleisath	2:34
6.	"When One Bests Defeat" (originally released on The Fall of Every Man)	Fox	Fox; Kleisath	2:46
7.	"Fearless Vampire Killers" (Bad Brains cover, originally released on Never Give In: A Tribute to Bad Brains)			2:30
8.	"Set Your Body Ablaze" (originally released on A Whole New Level of Sickness)	Fox	Fox	3:40
9.	"Anesthesia" (Bad Religion cover, originally released on A Whole New Level of Sickness)			2:46
10.	"Linoleum" (NOFX cover, originally released on A Whole New Level of Sickness)			2:09
11.	"Damage Inc." (Metallica cover, originally released on Crush 'Em All Vol. 1)			3:15
12.	"Lost Cause" (Negative Approach cover)			0:35
13.	"Faithless Is He Who Says Farewell When the Road Darkens" (originally released on Revelation 100: A Fifteen Year Retrospective of Rare Recordings)	Fox	Fox	5:54
Total length:				37:24

== Credits ==
Original 1997 line-up:

- Chad Gilbert – vocals
- Matt Fox – guitar
- Oliver Chapoy – guitar
- Dave Silber – bass guitar
- Steve Kleisath – drums

Compilation songs:

- Geert Van Der Velde – vocals
- Matthew Fletcher – guitar, bass guitar
- Jared Allen – bass guitar
- Spikey Goldbach – drums
- Damien Moyal – lyrics
