= Not Without a Heart Once Nourished by Sticks and Stones Within Blood Ill-Tempered Misanthropy Pure Gold Can Stay =

EP by New Found Glory and Shai Hulud
- Released: March 26, 2009
- Recorded: June–August 2008 at OPRA Music Studios; 2006–2007 at Silver Bullet Media
- Length: 6:45
- Label: Bridge 9
- Producer: Mark Hoppus; Matt Fox; Greg Thomas

Shai Hulud chronology
Misanthropy Pure (2008)	Not Without a Heart Once Nourished by Sticks and Stones Within Blood Ill-Tempered Misanthropy Pure Gold Can Stay (2009)	Reach Beyond the Sun (2013)

New Found Glory chronology
Not Without a Fight (2009)	Not Without a Heart... (2009)	Swiss Army Bro-Mance (2010)

Not Without a Heart Once Nourished by Sticks and Stones Within Blood Ill-Tempered Misanthropy Pure Gold Can Stay is a split EP by pop-punk band New Found Glory and hardcore punk band Shai Hulud. This limited edition EP was only available at shows on the "Not Without a Fight" tour with New Found Glory, Bayside, Set Your Goals, and Shai Hulud. This tour spanned from March 25, 2009 to May 10, 2009. However, the EP was not available until the March 26 show in San Diego. Shai Hulud's song featured on this release originally appeared on the band's album, Misanthropy Pure. New Found Glory contributed their song, "Truck Stop Blues" to the release, featured on their last album, Not Without a Fight, produced by Mark Hoppus of Blink-182.

The title makes reference of the albums: Not Without a Fight (New Found Glory), Hearts Once Nourished With Hope and Compassion (Shai Hulud), Stick and Stones (New Found Glory), That Within Blood Ill-Tempered (Shai Hulud), Misanthropy Pure (Shai Hulud) and Nothing Gold Can Stay (New Found Glory).

== Track listing ==
1. "Truck Stop Blues" – 2:16 (New Found Glory)
2. "Misanthropy Pure" – 4:29 (Shai Hulud)

== Credits ==
=== New Found Glory ===
- Jordan Pundik – lead vocals
- Chad Gilbert – guitar, backing vocalist
- Steve Klein – guitar, backing vocalist
- Ian Grushka – bass guitar, backing vocalist
- Cyrus Bolooki – drums, percussion
- Mark Hoppus – Producer
- Chris Holmes – Engineering
- Neal Avron – Mixing
- Ted Jansen – Mastering

=== Shai Hulud ===
- Matt Mazzali – vocals
- Matt Fox – guitar, producer, backing vocalist
- Matt Fletcher – bass, backing vocalist
- Andrew Gormley – drums
- Greg Thomas – Engineer, Co-producer
- Dave Quiggle – Artwork
- Eric Rachel – Mixing
