= Tension (hardcore band) =

American hardcore band

- Origin: South Florida, United States
- Genres: Hardcore punk, Christian hardcore, straight edge hardcore, punk rock
- Years active: 1993-1997
- Labels: Independent, Uprising, First Street, Endless Fight
- Past members: Mikey Hurley; Joe Keit; Chris Michaelis; Nick Dominguez; Ray Rodriguez; Eric Leon; Mike McDermit; Matt Fox; Ray Souza; Chad Gilbert; Kenny Fontaine; John Wylie
- Website: Tension on Facebook

Tension was a Christian straight-edge hardcore punk band that formed in 1993.

== History ==
In 1993, vocalist Mikey Hurley formed Tension, as a side project of his band Endure. Hurley hired Joe Keit of the Murrychesstoes on guitars and Chris Michaelis on drums. Soon thereafter, Nick Dominguez of Endure joined the band on bass guitar, which completed the first official lineup. Shortly after the band's first phone call together, the band demoed out six songs and recorded them two weeks later in studio. The songs became Tension's first release, In Our Time, which came out shortly after being recorded.

In 1993, Dominguez left the band to join Strongarm and was replaced by Ray Rodriguez. The band released The Sickness of our Age EP in 1994, which is considered to be their best release. Michaelis left the band shortly thereafter, being replaced by Eric Leon, which was when the band reached its peak. In 1995, the band went on tour with Uplipht and Strongarm, and played around 25-30 shows. Tension was then asked to partake in a 4-way split 7-inch with After All (Uplipht's new name), Culture, and Roosevelt on Intention Records but the release fell through.

Leon was soon thereafter asked to leave for reasons not released and was replaced by Mike McDermit. He performed on the band's debut album, Agent of the People. Tension signed to Uprising Records and released Agent of the People and re-released Sickness of Our Age.

Tension is looked at as classic or legendary in the Florida hardcore scene. The band also had various connections with several other well-known Florida bands, such as New Found Glory, Endure, Strongarm, Shai Hulud, and Further Seems Forever.

The band had several short term members, which included Matt Fox (Shai Hulud), Chad Gilbert (New Found Glory), Ray Souza (LOAD), Kenny Fontaine (Kenny Steel), and John Wylie (Where Fear and Weapons Meet). The band played shows with Earth Crisis, Hatebreed, Strife, Shelter, and Marilyn Manson.

In 2017, Mikey Hurley, the band's original member, died on July 18 at the age of 45. It was reported that he committed suicide. His death was mourned by his bandmates and his friends.

== Members ==
Last known lineup
Years	Name	Instrument
1993-1997	Michael "Mikey" Joseph Hurley II (died 2017)	Vocals
1993-1997	Joe Keit	Guitars
1993-1995, 1996-1997	Ray Rodriguez	Bass
1996-1997	Mike McDermit	Drums

Former members
Years	Name	Instrument
1993, 1995-1996	Nick Dominguez	Bass
1993	Matt Fox	Bass
1993-1994	Chris Michaelis	Drums
1994-1996	Eric Leon	Drums
	Chad Gilbert	
	John Wylie	Guitar
	Ray Souza	
	Kenny Fontaine	

== Discography ==
List of studio albums
Year	Title	Label
1996	Agent of the People	Uprising Records

List of EPs
Year	Title	Label
1993	In Our Time	First Street Records
1994	The Sickness of Our Age	Endless Fight Records

List of compilation appearances
Year	Title	Label
1994	SFSA: South Florida Slammie Awards Vol. 1	GJ Records
1994	"Stand Aside" on Identity?! Songs of Hatred	Century Media
1995	"Stand Aside" on Ceremony of Fire	Uprising
1995	"Greed" on Point Counterpoint	Inside Front Records
1995	"Greed" on South Florida Comp	Far Out Records
1995	"Unheard" on Over The Edge Compilation Vol. 2	Endless Fight
1995	"Stand Aside" on Stones to Mark a Fire	Militant Records/Vegan Earth Order
1995	"Stand Aside" on Bloodlines - The Seeds of Rebellion	Century Media
1996	"Greed" on Inside Front the Compact Disc	Inside Front
