= Black Atlantic =

Black Atlantic may refer to:

- The Black Atlantic: Modernity and Double Consciousness, a 1993 book by Paul Gilroy
- Black Atlantic (novel), q 2004 novel in the Judge Dredd series
- The Black Atlantic (band), a Dutch pop band
