= And None of Them Knew They Were Robots =

English hardcore punk band

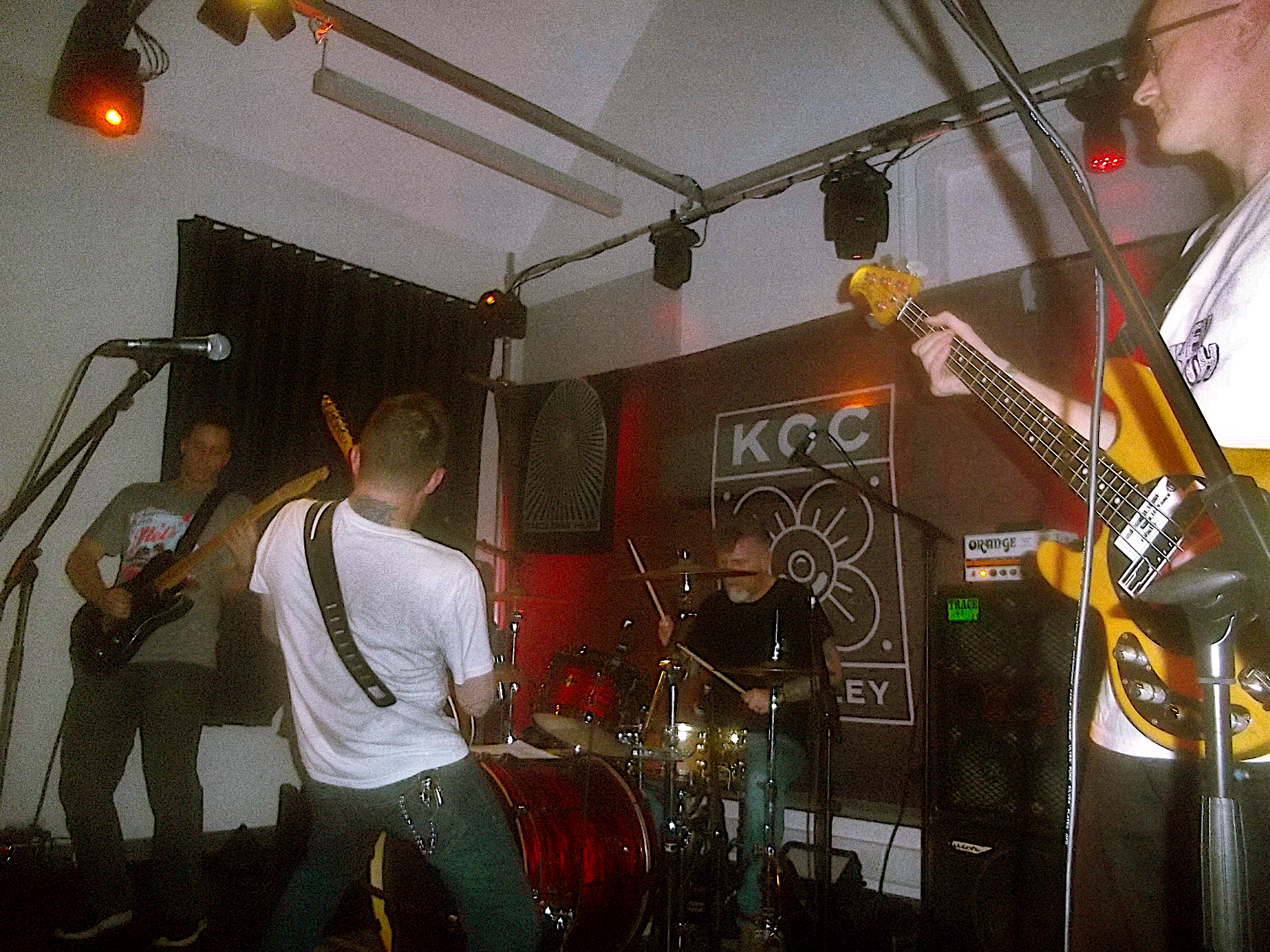
- And None of Them Knew They Were Robots performing live in 2025

Background information
- Also known as: The Robots
- Origin: Leeds, West Yorkshire, England
- Genres: Emo; post-hardcore; indie rock; hardcore punk
- Years active: 2000–2003, 2007, 2016, 2024–present
- Labels: Pig Dog, In at the Deep End, Jealous, Wolf Town
- Spinoffs: Send More Paramedics, Rays of Helios, Die Emergency
- Members: Kevin McGonnell; Duncan Hall; Sam Francis; Stuart Dobbins

And None of Them Knew They Were Robots (stylized as ...And None of Them Knew They Were Robots and also known as the Robots) are an English hardcore punk band from Leeds formed in 2000. In 2001, Francis, Hall and Dobbins began playing in crossover thrash band Send More Paramedics.

== History ==
The band was formed in 2000 by former members of pre-existing Leeds punk rock bands. In 2001, they released their debut self-titled album through Pigdog Records. In 2002, they released their second album, titled Liebestod, which saw a departure from their prior sound into regular hardcore punk, because of this, members and fans sometimes refer to it as the "Hardcore EP". In 2003, they released the EP Victory as a Drug through Jealous Records, which saw them return to their sound prior to Liebestod. On 1 August 2003, they played Out Of Spite Festival at Josephs Well. For the rest of August, they toured the U.K. for their final headline tour prior to their breakup. At Out of Spite festival 2007, they reformed for a single performance.

In 2016, they reformed for the release of their discography compilation and a U.K. headline tour.

The band reformed in 2024. In August 2025, they released a new album called Almanac.

== Musical style and legacy ==
The band have been categorised as emo post-hardcore and indie rock. Their 2002 album Liebestod showed a style closer to that of '80s Washington D.C. hardcore punk. Their music was influenced by Sunny Day Real Estate, Planes Mistaken for Stars, Cave In, Braid, Fugazi, Hot Water Music, Small Brown Bike, Les Savy Fav and At The Drive-In. In an article for Brainwashed, Graeme Rowland described them as "Rites of Spring mixed up with a more melodic Drive Like Jehu parts". They have influenced the sounds of ¡Forward, Russia!, This Et Al, The Lucida Console and Box Social.

== Members ==
- Kevin McGonnell – lead vocals, guitar
- Duncan Hall – guitar, backing vocals
- Sam Francis – bass, backing vocals
- Stuart Dobbins – drums, backing vocals

== Discography ==
Albums

- And None of Them Knew They Were Robots (2001)
- Liebestod (2002)
- Almanac (2025)

EPs

- Victory as a Drug (2003)

Compilations

- Discography (2016)
