= Dan Henk =

American artist and writer (born 1972)

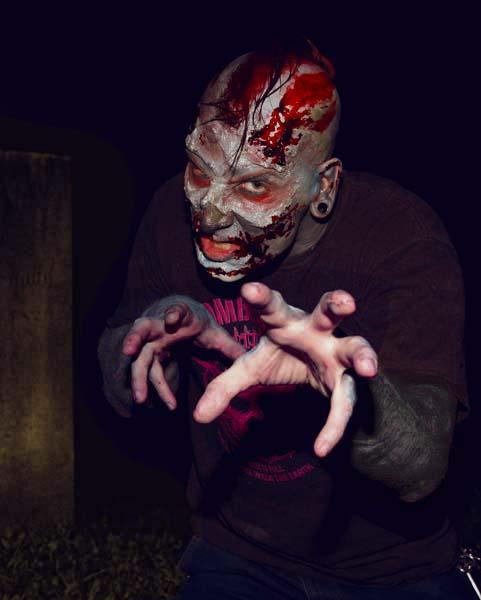
- Henk as a zombie
- Born: December 11, 1972 (age 53)
- Occupations: Tattoo artist, writer, painter
- Known for: Art, writing
- Spouse: Monica Castillo (deceased)
- Website: Danhenk.com

Daniel Jonathan Henk (born December 11, 1972) is an American artist and writer, noted for his work in tattooing and painting. He has produced record-album covers, political cartoons, controversial articles, and a variety of other media. Growing up a disaffected army brat, his early life revolved around a punk rock subculture that included bouts of homelessness and societal rejection.

== Early life ==
His beginning career included drawing political cartoons for Madcap Magazine and Maximum Rock and Roll. In 1997, after a violent car crash and a knife fight with a crackhead that severed the tendon on his left thumb, he attended art school. He received commercial and gallery acclaim and moved to New York City. Immersing himself in the local hardcore scene, he produced artwork for the bands Shai Hulud, Indecision, Coalesce, Locked in a Vacancy, Beyond Reason, Zombie Apocalypse and various local venues.

== Commercial success and tragedy ==
In 2000, he started tattooing, initially working on many musician friends. A year later, in September 2001, he was stricken with brain cancer and underwent surgery, chemotherapy, and radiation. During chemotherapy, he returned to his art projects with renewed fervor. Three months later, he married fellow tattoo artist Monica Castillo. After a brief venture down south, that included owning a short-lived tattoo shop, he returned to Manhattan and applied himself to art full-time. A productive period followed, with his work appearing in several tattoo magazines and more fine art-influenced outlets such as Aphrodesia and The Tarot Project. Tattoo-related books such as No Regrets: The Best, Worst, & Most #$%*ing Ridiculous Tattoos Ever, Tattoo Prodigies 1, Tattoo Prodigies 2, and Inside the Tattoo Circus: A Journey Through the Modern World of Tattoos also took notice and included features on the young artist. Tragedy struck again in 2007, as his wife of 6 years, Monica Henk, was killed by an SUV while driving a motorcycle. Despite extensive coverage in the local media and vigorous campaigns by both the tattoo and motorcycle communities, the culprit was never found.

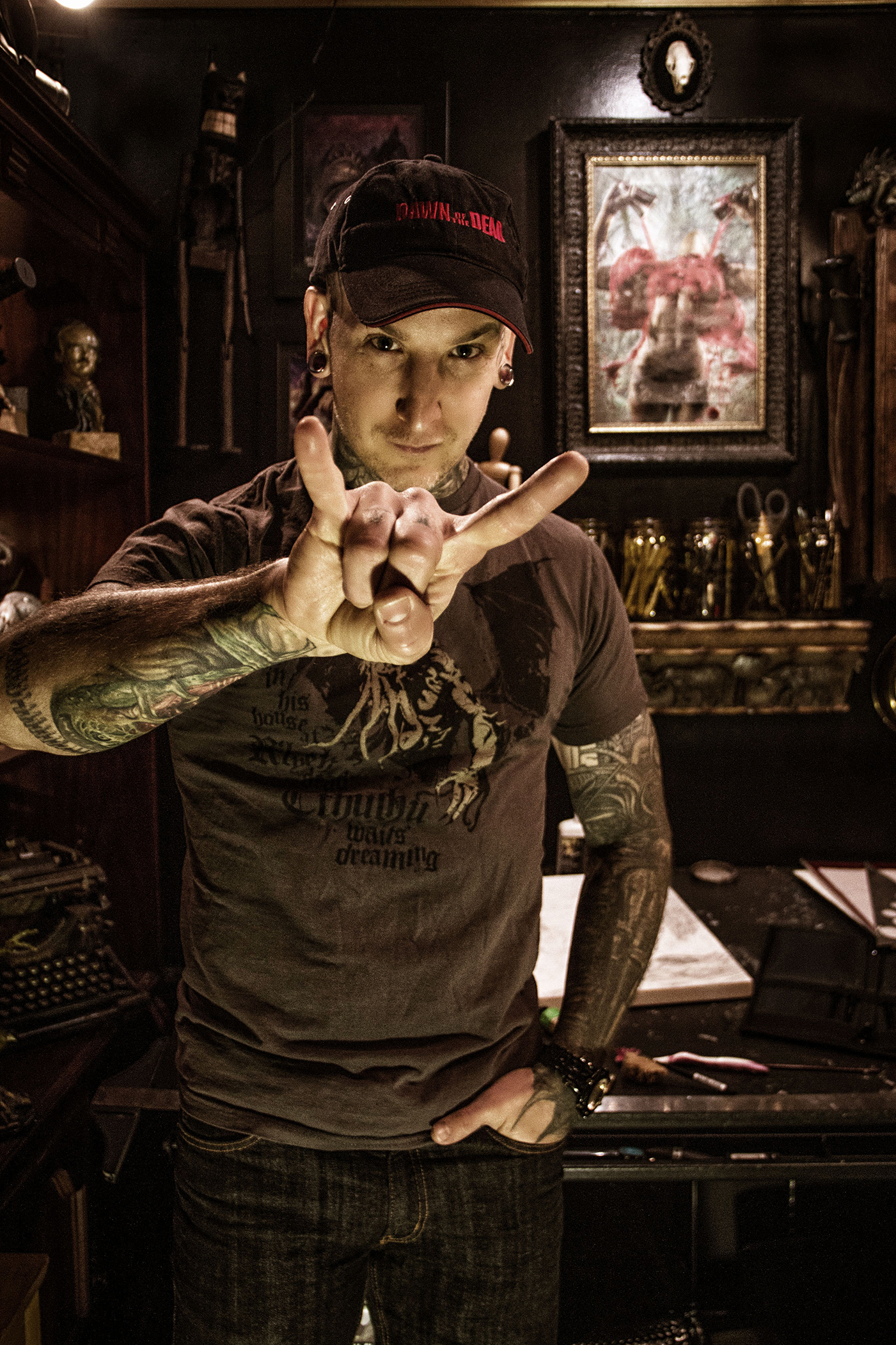

== A new start ==
He moved to Austin, Texas for three years to re-evaluate his career, and a heavy spate of activity followed. He started doing a regular comic strip entitled "Rollo & Me" for Tattoo Artist Magazine, illustrations for Black Static Magazine, Splatterpunk Zine, and This is Horror. His first novel, The Black Seas of Infinity, was published by Anarchy Books in 2011. A limited edition chapbook entitled "Christmas Is Cancelled" came out courtesy of Splatterpunk in 2013. Relocating yet again, this time to Philadelphia, Pennsylvania, and then two years later back to Brooklyn, New York, he's currently writing, illustrating, and tattooing.

He started writing a regular column for Tattoo Revue and Skin Art magazines in 2014. Permuted Press re-released The Black Seas of Infinity in April 2015, and a collection of his short stories, Down Highways in the Dark...by Demons Driven. He continued his work for independent magazines, doing art for Red Door Magazine, The Horror Zine, Litro Magazine, Out Of Step, and the British horror zine Splatterpunk. Books started to feature his artwork on their covers. "The Sopaths" by Piers Anthony, "Splatterpunks Not Dead", "Splatterpunk Fighting Back", "Past Indiscretions", "Bloodstains, "Insatiable", "The Flood"."Tales for Dark Hours" and "The Red Death". His third novel, "The End of the World" debuted in April 2019. 2023 saw the debut of his anthology The Never Dead His second anthology The Joke is on Mankind debuted in 2025. He currently runs the tattoo shop The Abyss in Long Beach, NY, and hosts the Skull Session podcast
