= Stephen Roessner =

- Origin: Binghamton, New York, United States
- Genres: Experimental, electronic, indie rock, post rock, ambient,
- Occupations: Musician, composer, record producer, mixer
- Instruments: Drums, percussion, guitar, programming, banjo, bass, piano, keyboards, celeste
- Years active: 2002–present
- Label: Burnt Toast Vinyl
- Website: www.calibratedrecording.com

Dr. Stephen Roessner is an American Grammy Award winning recording engineer, musician and producer from Binghamton, New York. He currently resides in Rochester, New York and is mostly known for his performance in the group Saxon Shore. He is currently active playing drums in Fuzzrod and as a solo artist known as Small Signals.

Stephen is currently an assistant professor in the Audio & Music Engineering Program at The University of Rochester.

He owns and operates Calibrated Sound in Rochester, NY. He formerly worked at The Juilliard School as a recording engineer and video editor.

Dr. Roessner holds both Doctorate and Masters degrees in Electrical Engineering from The University of Rochester. He is a graduate of The Rod Serling School of Fine Arts in Binghamton High School located in Binghamton, New York and studied under percussionist Joel Smales and still remains as close friends to this day. Stephen was honored as a Distinguished Graduate by Binghamton High School in 2012. Stephen attended SUNY Fredonia where he earned a degree in Sound Recording Technology studying under producer Dave Fridmann. He also earned a degree in Music Performance in Percussion under percussionist Kay Stonefelt.

In 2014, Stephen gave a TEDxFlourCity talk on the importance of audio quality, imploring the audience to listen closer and give more thought to how they consume music.

== Bands ==
- League (2002–2005)
- Saxon Shore (2005–present)
- Fuzzrod (2016–present)
- The Gritty Midi Gang (2006–2009)
- Revengineers (2011–2013)
- Williams Shift (2012–present)
- Pleistocene (2012-2016)
- Small Signals (2014–present)
- Talking Under Water (2014–2015)
