= Strongarm (band) =

American Christian hardcore band

- Also known as: Ikthus (1991–1993)
- Origin: Pompano Beach, Florida, US
- Genres: Christian hardcore, Christian metal
- Years active: 1993–1998, 2000
- Labels: Tooth & Nail, Solid State, Blood and Ink (affiliated)
- Past members: Nick Dominguez; Joshua Colbert; Chris Carbonell; Chad Neptune; Jason Berggren; Bob Franquiz; Steve Kleisath; Matt Fox; Matt Fletcher

Strongarm was a five-piece Christian and straight edge hardcore band, formed in Pompano Beach, Florida. They were one of the first "Spirit-Filled" hardcore bands, along with Unashamed, Overcome, Focused and Zao.

== Biography ==
Between 1990 and 1991, Ikthus, a local punk band consisting of vocalist Dave Bean, guitarist Jason Berggren, drummer Chris Carbonell and bassist Matt Fletcher, was formed. Flecher quit early on and was replaced by Chad Neptune, a friend of the band. Ikthus went on to disband later in 1993. However, Carbonell, Neptune, and Berggren sought to form a new band following this.

Carbonell, Neptune, and Berggren eventually united with their friend Josh Colbert, who previously had performed in another Christian hardcore band called Endure. Nick Dominguez, also formerly of Endure and Tension, joined the band as a guitarist. Together, the five created the name of Strongarm.

Strongarm released a demo, These Times That Try Men’s Souls, and had originally planned on signing to Victory Records, but eventually settled on Tooth & Nail Records. Strongarm recorded Atonement in 1995 and released it through Tooth & Nail. The album had been produced by hardcore producer Jeremy Staska, who would go on to work with Nonpoint and Poison the Well. Following the album's recording and release, Carbonell and Dominguez were fired from the band by Berggren in hopes to bring in new members. According to Dominguez, he quit after Carbonell was fired.

After Carbonell and Dominguez were fired, Strongarm hired on guitarist Bob Franquiz and drummer Steve Kleisath. About six months after the departure of Carbonell and Dominguez, Franquiz and Berggren left the band. Both Carbonell and Domiguez rejoined, while leaving Kleisath on drums. Carbonell had been called in by the members to help try out new vocalists. However, none of the try-outs worked out, with Carbonell decided to try-out himself, earning the vocalist position, after never having performed before.

Strongarm released Advent of a Miracle in 1997, marking the first release on the new Tooth & Nail subsidiary Solid State Records. In 1998, Strongarm decided to disband following the release. Most of the members move on to form Further Seems Forever, with Carbonell even being offered the vocalist position. Carbonell declined due to his inability to sing cleanly. A post on Strongarm's website directs fans to Further Seems Forever, the members' new band.

In 2000, the band reunited for Furnace Fest. On the song "Trials", they had their friend and Shai Hulud guitarist Matt Fox on drums. In 2009, there was an unauthorized tribute show at Cornerstone Festival, which caused some controversy. In July 2010, Blood and Ink Records released Strongarm's, Atonement on vinyl. Original vocalist Jason Berggren was featured on a song, "The Call", by fellow Christian hardcore band, Venia. In later years, there was talk of a reunion from the Advent lineup. However, after meeting and discussing it, certain members were not fond of returning, while others, such as Carbonell, were hopeful to perform with the band once again. In 2021, a rumor of a Strongarm reunion for a returning Furnace Fest occurred when the members of Further Seems Forever (also of Strongarm) posted some lyrics from the band's former content. At the end of Further Seems Forever's setlist, the band played a cover of "The Advent of a Miracle" with Joe Musten of Advent and Beloved.

== Members ==
Final line-up

- Chris Carbonell – drums (1993–1995), vocals (1996–1998, 2000) (formerly of Age of Awakening)
- Nick Dominguez – rhythm guitar (1993–1995, 1996–1998, 2000) (formerly of Tension, formerly of Endure, Further Seems Forever)
- Joshua Colbert – lead guitar (1993–1998, 2000) (formerly of Endure, Further Seems Forever)
- Chad Neptune – bass (1993–1998, 2000) (Further Seems Forever)
- Steve Kleisath – drums (1995–1998, 2000) (formerly of Shai Hulud, formerly of PULL, Further Seems Forever)

Live

- Matt Fox – drums (1994, 2000) (Shai Hulud)

Former

- Jason Bergerren – vocals (1993–1996)
- Bob Franquiz – guitars (1995–1996)

== Discography ==
Demos

- 1993: Strongarm (First Street Records)
- 1993: These Times That Try Men's Souls

EPs

- 1994: Division EP (Tooth & Nail Records)
- 1995: Trials EP (Tooth & Nail Records)

Studio albums

- 1995: Atonement (Tooth & Nail Records)
- 1997: The Advent of a Miracle (Tooth & Nail Records\Solid State Records)
