= Release the Cure =

Studio album by Indecision
- Released: 1999
- Label: M.I.A. Records
- Producer: Roger Miret

Professional ratings
Review scores
Source	Rating
Kerrang!	2/5 stars

Release the Cure is the fourth and final full-length album released by American hardcore band Indecision. It was produced by Roger Miret of Agnostic Front and released on M.I.A. Records in 1999.

The album saw the band experiment with a more metal sound, re-recording songs from previous albums; and the lyrical content was notably more socio-political, with songs questioning the government and health care, and conspiracy theories regarding AIDS and cancer research.

Indecision disbanded in May 2000 in El Paso, Texas after a show with Kill Your Idols.

== Track listing ==
1. Higher Side of Low
2. May Be Monitored to Assure Quality Control
3. Release the Cure
4. Through the Wasteland Go Searching We
5. Tunnel Vision
6. Burning Saints
7. Crawling
8. Save Me
9. Dead
10. Suspension of Disbelief
11. At the Wake
12. This Time Tomorrow
13. End of a Short Rope
