= Saxon Shore (band) =

American band

Background information
- Origin: Philadelphia, Pennsylvania, United States
- Genres: Post-rock; instrumental rock; ambient; shoegaze
- Years active: 2001–2009
- Labels: Broken Factory Records (2001-2002, 2009); Burnt Toast Vinyl (2003-2009)
- Members: Oliver Chapoy; Matt Doty; Stephen Roessner; Will Stichter
- Past members: Josh Tillman; Zach Tillman; Matt Stone
- Website: www.saxonshore.com

Saxon Shore was an American post-rock band consisting of members from Philadelphia, Brooklyn, New York, Los Angeles, and Rochester, New York. The group released five albums: one packaged as an EP (Luck Will Not Save Us...) and four as full-lengths.

Saxon Shore's overall sound has been compared to Caspian, Explosions in the Sky, Joy Wants Eternity, This Will Destroy You, and God Is an Astronaut.

== History ==
Saxon Shore formed in 2001 as the joint project of guitarist Matthew Doty and drummer Josh Tillman. The two wrote several songs that, in time, were recorded for the duo's debut album Be a Bright Blue, released on Doty's own imprint, Broken Factory Records. Tillman's brother Zach was recruited for bass duties for multiple North American tours.

After a host of tours across the United States (in which the band recruited three separate bassists), Tillman moved to Seattle and later exchanged four-tracks with Doty, who was living in upstate New York at the time. Studio time reserved in Atlanta eventually blossomed into their next effort, Four Months of Darkness. The full-length The Exquisite Death of Saxon Shore followed in 2005, and the group's final album, It Doesn't Matter, was issued in 2009.

Since 2005, Saxon Shore members have gone on to work on other musical projects, including: Midnight Faces - featuring Doty and singer Phil Stancil; Williams Shift - featuring Stone and Roessner, with Matt Thomas and Jill Purdy; Soporus - featuring Stichter and Stone; Certain Creatures - solo work by Chapoy; and Small Signals - solo work by Roessner.

== Members ==
=== Current members ===
- Matt Doty – Electric guitar, keyboards, programming, rhodes, piano
- Oliver Chapoy – Guitar, piano, rhodes, synths, programming, celeste
- Stephen Roessner – drums, vibraphone, rhodes, percussion, arrangement
- Will Stichter – Bass guitar

=== Former members ===
- Josh Tillman – Drums (2001–2004)
- Zach Tillman – Bass guitar (2002–2004)
- Matt Stone – Electric guitar, keyboards (2003)

=== Touring members ===
- Justin Saxby – Bass guitar (summer 2003)
- Bethany Olson – Keyboards (winter 2003)
- Joel Votaw – Bass guitar (spring–summer 2003)
- Erin Berkey – Keyboards, bells (summer 2002)
- Jesse Pierce – Bass guitar (winter 2002)
- Steve Hoffman - Guitar (summer 2006)
- John Mallinen - Drums (summer 2006)
- Jason Torrance - Drums (fall 2006)

== Discography ==
- 2002: Be a Bright Blue – LP (Broken Factory Records)
- 2003: Four Months of Darkness – LP (Burnt Toast Vinyl)
- 2005: Be a Bright Blue (Digipak re-release) – LP (Burnt Toast Vinyl)
- 2005: Luck Will Not Save Us From a Jackpot of Nothing – EP (Burnt Toast Vinyl)
- 2005: The Exquisite Death of Saxon Shore – LP (Burnt Toast Vinyl)
- 2009: It Doesn't Matter – LP (Broken Factory Records/& Records)
