= Midnight Faces (band) =

American pop music group

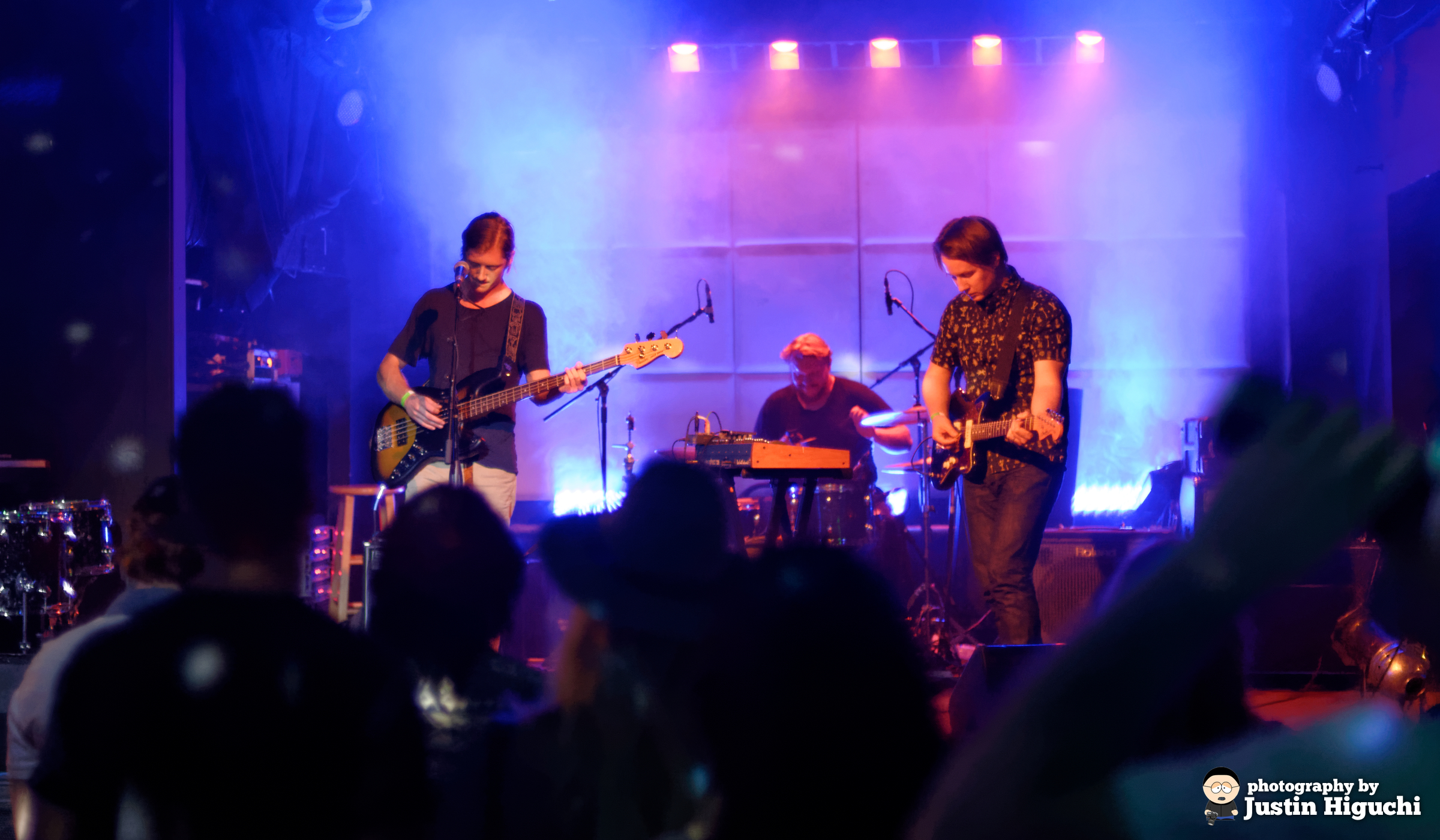
Midnight Faces performing in Los Angeles, 2014

Midnight Faces is an American pop music group originally from Grand Rapids, Michigan and now based in Los Angeles, whose style is influenced by 1980s-era synthpop and post-punk.

Midnight Faces was founded as a duo by composer Matt Doty (a former member of Saxon Shore alongside J. Tillman) and vocalist Philip Stancil. The duo initially lived in different cities (Doty in Grand Rapids, Michigan and Stancil in Washington, D.C.) and created their music using Internet-enabled file sharing, but by November 2014, both members had moved to Los Angeles. For their third album, 2016's Heavenly Bodies, the group expanded to a trio, adding drummer Paul Doyle to its lineup.

== Members ==
- Matthew Doty - guitar, keyboards, synthesizers
- Philip Stancil - vocals, guitar, bass
- Paul Doyle - drums

== Discography ==
- Fornication (Broken Factory Records, 2013)
- The Fire Is Gone (Broken Factory, 2014)
- Heavenly Bodies (Broken Factory, 2016)
