= Matt Fox (musician) =

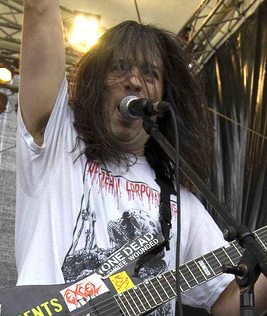
- Fox in 2008

Background information
- Also known as: The World Devourer (on The Fall of Every Man)
- Born: Matthew Ian Fox; April 28, 1973 (age 53); Smithtown, New York, U.S.
- Origin: Pompano Beach, Florida, U.S.
- Genres: Metalcore; hardcore punk
- Occupations: Musician, songwriter
- Instruments: Guitar, bass, drums
- Years active: 1990–present

Matthew Ian Fox (born April 28, 1973) is an American musician, founding member and a current lead guitarist for the hardcore punk band Shai Hulud and his side project Zombie Apocalypse.

Fox writes most of Shai Hulud's musical and lyrical output. He has also played guitar in many other rock bands, like Planet X, The Murrychesstoes, The One Eyed Kings, Unwillful Demise, S.F.B and Bingo Mut.

== Metalcore term ==
Fox is credited with popularising the "metalcore" term in the late 1990s/early 2000s, identifying bands like Earth Crisis, Deadguy and Integrity as metalcore bands, even calling Shai Hulud a metalcore band back then as a tongue-in-cheek term with his friends. However, in some interviews, he has stated that he no longer considers Shai Hulud a metalcore band, since the term "has lost its original meaning", i.e. hardcore bands with a "heavier" sound. Fox called the genre "trite" and "shallow music", "made by people that imitate it rather than love it". As of 2015, he refers to Shai Hulud's sound as "Shai Hulud Unincorporated".

== Ides of March and At Dawn We Wage War ==
In 1999, Fox founded the independent record label Ides of March, releasing music by bands like Glasseater, Brother's Keeper, Destro and Poison the Well. Fox secured an exclusive distribution deal through Revelation Records, to which his band Shai Hulud was already signed. Ides of March was originally scheduled to release Shai Hulud side-projects like A New Found Glory, Boddicker and re-issues of obscure Shai Hulud material, but shifted instead to releasing music by close friends. In early 2003, after having put out twelve releases as Ides of March, Fox changed the name of the record label to At Dawn We Wage War, announcing the release of a Shai Hulud compilation. The label however only released a handful of things under the new name and by 2005, it had faded out. The Shai Hulud compilation evolved into A Comprehensive Retrospective: or How We Learned to Stop Worrying and Release Bad and Useless Recordings, which was eventually co-released by At Dawn We Wage War and Revelation Records in January 2005.

== Personal life ==
Although Fox practices a drug- and alcohol-free lifestyle, he is not part of the straight edge movement, as stated in many interviews.

Fox's favorite group is the thrash metal band Metallica. He also has been influenced by many other hardcore punk, metallic hardcore, thrash metal, punk rock and progressive metal bands.

Fox has stated that he suffers from coulrophobia, a fear of clowns. Fox also has an extreme love for the Muppets, stating that Kermit is his favorite.

== Bands ==
- Evilalive – drums (1990–1991)
- Planet X – drums (1991)
- The Murrychesstoes – drums, guitar (1991–1992)
- Bingo Mut – drums (1993–1994)
- Unwillful Demise (1994)
- Strongarm – drums (1994, 2000 Live)
- The One-eyed Kings – bass (1995)
- S.F.B
- Tension – bass (1993)
- The Day It Rained on Aracus
- Shai Hulud – lead guitar, backup vocals (1995–present)
- New Found Glory – fill in guitar (1998)
- Zombie Apocalypse (formerly called "Boddicker") – guitar (1998, 2003–present)

== Discography ==
- The Murrychesstoes - First demo (1991)
- The Murrychesstoes - Second demo (1992)
- Unwillful Demise - Unsigned Iii Killing Time Compilation (1994)
8. "Nuclear Door"
- Bingo Mut - Demo (1994)
- Bingo Mut - The Meanest Man EP (1995)
1. "Stop the Bus It's Russell Epstein" - 3:22
2. "I Can Own the World" - 2:22
3. "Amir Bacollie" - 2:13
4. "I'm Done" - 2:27
- Bingo Mut - Unreleased EP (1995)
- Shai Hulud - 1995 Demo (1995)
- Shai Hulud - 1996 Demo (1996)
1. "For the World" - 3:02
2. "This Wake I Myself Have Stirred" - 2:54
3. "Hardly" - 3:28
- Shai Hulud - A Profound Hatred of Man EP (1997)
- Shai Hulud - Hearts Once Nourished with Hope and Compassion (1997)
- Shai Hulud - The Fall of Every Man (Split with Indecision, 1998)
- Boddicker - Demo (1998)
- Shai Hulud - A Whole New Level of Sickness Split with Another Victim (1999)
- Shai Hulud - Crush 'Em All Vol. 1 (Split with Boy Sets Fire, 2000)
- Further Seems Forever - The Moon is Down
7. "Just Until Sundown" - 3:14
- Shai Hulud - That Within Blood Ill-Tempered (2003)
- Zombie Apocalypse - This is a Spark of Life (2003)
- Zombie Apocalypse - Tales Told by Dead Men (Split with Send More Paramedics, 2005)
- Shai Hulud - Great Worm (2006 Demo)
1. "To Bear the Brunt of Many Blades" - 3:45
2. "We Who Finish Last" - 3:15
3. "If A Mountain be my Obstacle" 3:22
- Shai Hulud - A Comprehensive Retrospective: or How We Learned to Stop Worrying and Release Bad and Useless Recordings (2005)
- Shai Hulud - Misanthropy Pure (2008)
- Shai Hulud - Not Without a Heart Once Nourished by Sticks and Stones Within Blood Ill-Tempered Misanthropy Pure Gold Can Stay (Split with New Found Glory, 2009)
- Shai Hulud - Reach Beyond the Sun (2013)
- Shai Hulud - Just Can't Hate Enough (2015)
