= Beecher (band) =

British mathcore band

- Origin: Manchester, England
- Genres: Mathcore, metalcore, progressive metal
- Years active: 2001–2006, 2010-2011
- Labels: Earache Records; Calculated Risk Records; In at the Deep End Records
- Past members: David Hopkinson; Charles Edward Godby; Mark Lyons; Daniel Shaw; Daniel Jones; Daniel Plant; Will Shaw

Beecher were a British mathcore band from Manchester. Formed in 2001 by Daniel Plant (guitars), Ed Godby (vocals), Mark Lyons (guitars), Will Shaw (drums) and David Hopkinson (bass), they played a mix of metalcore, noise rock and progressive metal.

== History ==
They toured the UK and Europe with Killswitch Engage, Norma Jean and Darkest Hour. The original intent was for the band to be a doom metal experiment, but the recruitment of vocalist Charles Edward Godby, and guitarist Mark Lyons, made a full band line-up.

After the recording of a five-track demo CD, the band released the Resention Is a Big Word in a Small Town EP for Nottingham-based In at the Deep End Records in 2002. This was followed by the album Breaking The Fourth Wall in 2003 on Calculated Risk Records. Soon after this release, Daniel Plant left the band, temporarily being replaced by Niall Wright of D-Rail but was eventually replaced by Daniel Shaw. Will Shaw left the band later, with Daniel Jones eventually being chosen as his replacement. After much critical acclaim, and a lot of touring, the band signed with Earache Records in 2004. Earache re-released Breaking The Fourth Wall in 2005 with six bonus tracks. 2005 also saw the release of Beecher's second full-length album This Elegy, His Autopsy. This album, as well as being released as a standard CD, was also released as a limited edition vinyl box-set (limited to 1000 copies).

The band's breakup was announced in January 2006, and the final show was at the Star and Garter in Manchester on 2 February 2006, playing alongside Narcosis and D-Rail. Beecher played two sets: one with their original drummer made up of earlier songs (including a rare airing of "The Only One I Know"), and one with his replacement where This Elegy, His Autopsy was performed in full. David Hopkinson and Ed Godby played in The Freezing Fog. Godby later emigrated to Belgium where he formed the bands Castles and Supergenius. Daniel Shaw currently plays in Wode and his new band Aggressive Perfector.

The band briefly reformed during December 2010-June 2011, for a one-off ten-year anniversary show at Manchester's Moho Live with support from Trojan Horse and Nasdaq. Two more shows were announced for Leeds and London. However, after they finished the planned shows in late June 2011 they announced they were no plans to make the reunion permanent.

== Discography ==
- Split 7-inch w/The Leif Ericsson, 7-inch EP, 2002, In At The Deep End Records.
- Resention Is a Big Word in a Small Town, CD EP, 2002, In At The Deep End Records.
- Breaking The Fourth Wall, CD album, 2003, Calculated Risk Records; re-released by Earache Records, 2005, MOSH 307.
- This Elegy, His Autopsy, CD album, 2005, Earache Records, MOSH 319; also released on vinyl as a box set.
