= Reach Beyond the Sun =

Studio album by Shai Hulud
- Released: February 19, 2013
- Genres: Metalcore; hardcore punk
- Length: 34:07
- Label: Metal Blade
- Producer: Chad Gilbert

Shai Hulud chronology
Not Without a Heart... (2009)	Reach Beyond the Sun (2013)	Just Can't Hate Enough (2015)

Singles from Reach Beyond the Sun
- 1. "Reach Beyond the Sun" Released: December 10, 2012; 2. "A Human Failing" Released: February 25, 2013

Reach Beyond the Sun is the fourth studio album by hardcore punk band Shai Hulud, released on February 15, 2013, in Europe and on February 19 in the U.S. through Metal Blade Records. It has been met with positive reviews.

== Track list ==
All lyrics are written by Shai Hulud.

No.	Title	Length
1.	"The Mean Spirits, Breathing"	2:56
2.	"I, Saturnine"	1:46
3.	"Reach Beyond the Sun"	3:00
4.	"A Human Failing"	3:30
5.	"Man Into Demon: And Their Faces Are Twisted With the Pain of Living"	2:57
6.	"Medicine to the Dead"	3:20
7.	"To Suffer Fools"	1:42
8.	"Think the Adder Benign"	3:56
9.	"Monumental Graves"	3:54
10.	"If a Mountain Be My Obstacle"	3:30
11.	"At Least a Plausible Case for Pessimism"	3:35
Total length:		34:07

== Credits ==
Professional ratings
Aggregate scores
Source	Rating
Metacritic	78/100
Review scores
Source	Rating
AllMusic	3.5/5 stars
Alternative Press	4.5/5 stars
Exclaim!	Favorable
Q	3/5 stars
Sputnikmusic	5/5
Under the Gun Review	8/10

- Chad Gilbert – vocals, producer
- Matt Fox – guitar
- Matthew Fletcher – bass guitar
- Matt Covey – drums
- Justin Kraus (With Life in Mind) – backup vocals
- Damien Moyal – guest vocals on "Medicine to the Dead"
- Matt Mazzali – guest vocals on "Medicine to the Dead"
- Geert van der Velde – guest vocals on "Medicine to the Dead"
- Louis Hernandez (Alpha & Omega) – guest vocals on "Man Into Demon: and Their Faces are Twisted With the Pain of Living"
- Jonathan Vigil (The Ghost Inside) – guest vocals on "If A Mountain be My Obstacle"
- Jay Pepito (Reign Supreme) – guest vocals on "A Human Failing"
- Stephen Looker – backing vocals
- Dave Quiggle – artwork

== Release history ==
Country	Release date
Europe	February 15, 2013
United States	February 19, 2013
Worldwide	February 19, 2013
