= Send More Paramedics =

British crossover thrash band

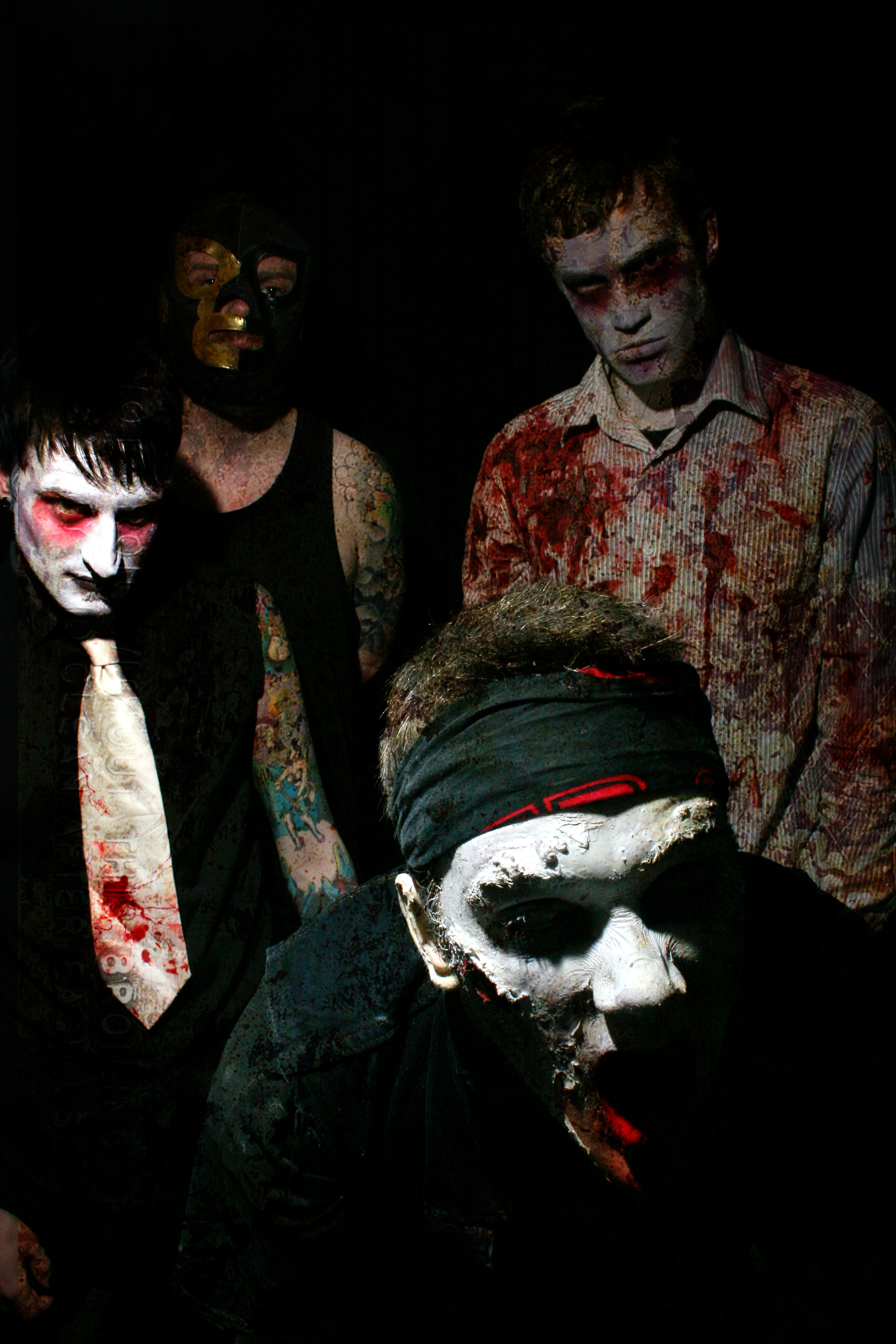
- Send More Paramedics, from left to right: X. Undead, El Diablo, B'Hellmouth, Medico.

Background information
- Origin: Leeds, West Yorkshire, England
- Genres: Crossover thrash
- Years active: 2001–2007, 2014, 2021–present
- Labels: In at the Deep End, 30 Days of Night, We Are Horror Records
- Spinoff of: And None of Them Knew They Were Robots
- Members: B'Hellmouth; Medico; X. Undead; El Diablo
- Website: wearehorrorrecords.co.uk/artist-send-more-paramedics

Send More Paramedics is an English zombie film-influenced crossover thrash band from Leeds, West Yorkshire. They are named after a line in the film The Return of the Living Dead.

== History ==
The name is a reference to a line in the 1985 horror/comedy The Return of the Living Dead. The band originally formed as a side project of Leeds emo band And None of Them Knew They were Robots, but they gained a higher profile than And None of Them Knew They Were Robots.

The band played in the 1980s crossover style, described as "Zombiecore...a fusion of 80s thrash and modern hardcore punk", with lyrics about zombies and cannibalism, and were heavily influenced by zombie movies. On stage, they dressed as zombies and the drummer donned a Mexican wrestling mask (a homage to the character in Brian Clement's Meat Market films with whom he also shares the name El Diablo). As part of this on-stage persona, band members claimed to be members of the living dead.

The band performed at the 2005 Download Festival, the 2006 Reading and Leeds Festivals, were one of the first acts confirmed for 2006's Damnation Festival and were the opening act for Avenged Sevenfold at the Camden Underworld. They also toured as support to The Offspring. Their live show was described by Drowned in Sound as "brilliantly ghoulish" and "mouth-agape entertainment of the highest quality".

Disc 2 of their 2006 album, The Awakening, is a concept disc, a zombie movie soundtrack, similar to the soundtrack in George A. Romero's Dawn of the Dead.

They won the 'fresh meat' competition on Zane Lowe's BBC Radio 1 show, leading to a "Guerilla Gig Live" performance on BBC Three. The video for which has recently been re-uploaded to YouTube.

The band's third album, The Awakening, featured guest appearances from Jeff Walker and Ken Owen from Carcass.

The band announced their impending split in a Myspace blog in June 2007, which read: "Dear Mortals, Send More Paramedics will be playing their last show on 27 October 2007 at Joseph's Well in Leeds. We will be honouring all the commitments we have made up to that date. It's been 6 years but our zombie corpses are finally rotting to the point at which we can continue no more. A million thanks to you all. Yours faithfully, SMP".

The band briefly reformed in early 2014 to play TDON 10, a one-day indoor festival celebrating 10 years of 'Thirty Days of Night Records', also on the bill were; Azriel, Everette, Crossbreaker, Broken Teeth, Martyr Defiled, Grader, Public Domain, Iron Witch, Opium Lord, and Set Astray. They also performed two other shows in a short run.

The band reunited to perform 4 'one-off' shows to celebrate their 20th anniversary in October 2021.

On 25 June 2021 the band announced via their social media pages they had begun work on a 4th album, their first in 15 years. The album, entitled The Final Feast was released digitally September 2021.

== Members ==
- B'Hellmouth (Sam) – vocals
- Medico (Duncan) – guitar
- X. Undead (Martyn) – bass
- El Diablo (Stuart) – drums

== Discography ==
=== Albums ===
- 2002 – A Feast for the Fallen (In at the Deep End Records/Violent Change Records)
- 2004 – The Hallowed and the Heathen (IATDE Records/Hellbent Records)
- 2006 – The Awakening (IATDE Records)
- 2021 – The Final Feast (Shield Recordings/Self-Released)

=== Split albums ===
- 2005 – Tales Told by Dead Men with Zombie Apocalypse (IATDE Records/Hellbent Records)
- 2005 – North of England, South of Heaven EP with The Nothing (Thirty Days of Night Records)

=== Compilation albums ===
- 2007 – Send More Paramedics (Self-Released) - A cassette collection of unreleased tracks/covers and a re-release of the band's first demo produced by Jason Sanderson

=== Video albums ===
- 2002 – Live at the Feeding Grounds (IATDE Records) – A video CD given away free with the first 50 mail orders of the 'A Feast for the Fallen' album on IATDE Records

=== Demos ===
- 2001 – Demo (Self-Released) – A cassette initially given away prior to the bands first (and at the time only) show, which led to their signing to IATDE records

=== Live albums ===
- 2020 – Undead at the BBC (Self-Released, digital only)

=== Music videos ===
Send More Paramedics have made three music videos, "Zombie Crew," "Nothing Tastes Like This," and "Blood Fever," which is the third and most recent. The promo for "Blood Fever" was released 16 February 2007 on the director's site:. The video is inspired loosely by the '80s horror film Night of the Demons and was directed by Adam Powell.

=== Contributed tracks to ===
- Thrashing Like a Maniac (Earache Records compilation, 2007)
