= Warm Ghost =

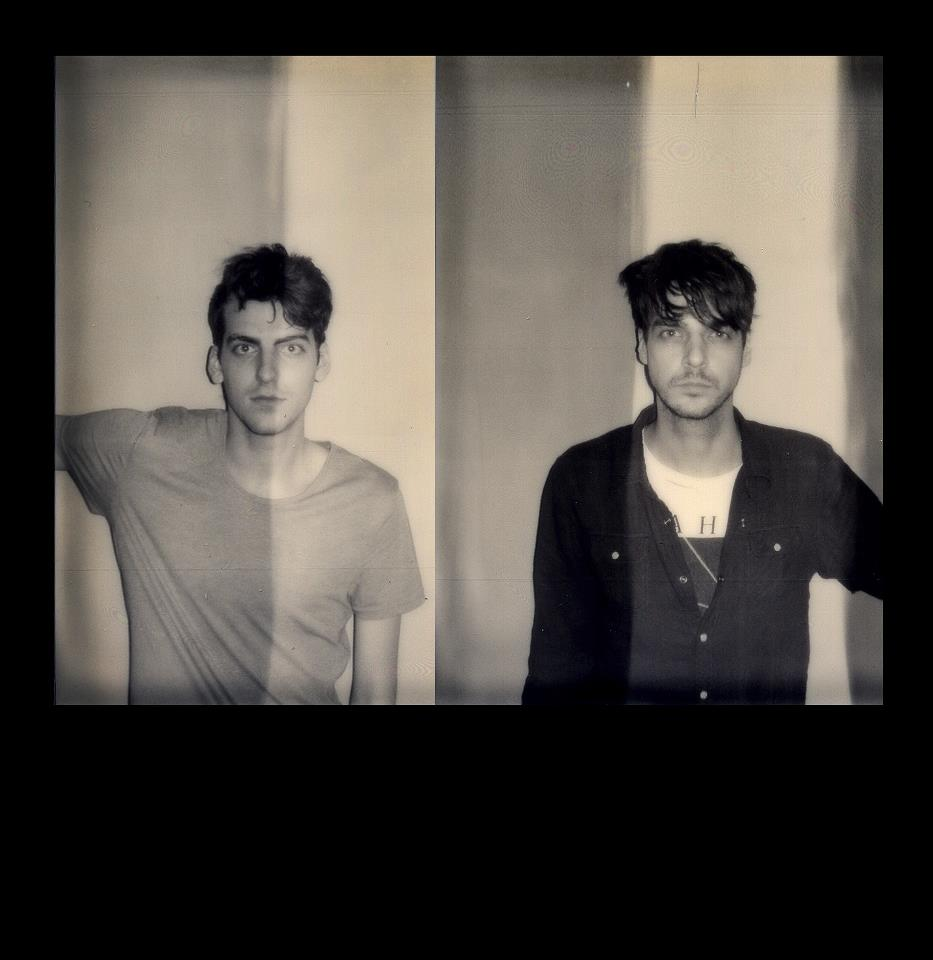
Warm Ghost - Daniel Lewis ( L ) - Paul Duncan ( R )

Warm Ghost is an electronic experimental pop group based out of Brooklyn, New York, specializing in ambient synth pop. Formed by singer / multi-instrumentalist Paul Duncan, Warm Ghost became a duo with Daniel Lewis in 2011. The group pairs spacious synthesizers with skittering, electronic beats, creating a textural sound that is highly eclectic. Their recordings have drawn comparisons to numerous genres and groups, including Autechre, Depeche Mode, Fennesz, Orchestral Manoeuvres in the Dark, and Cluster. Paul Duncan has said that Arthur Russell is an influence on Warm Ghost.

In 2011, Warm Ghost made their debut with the Claws Overhead EP, released on Geographic North, and followed up later that year with their first full-length effort, Narrows, on Partisan Records. The group is notable for positive attention from avant-garde music critics.

Duncan was born in East Texas, but studied painting and sound design at Savannah College of Art and Design in Savannah, Georgia, before moving to Atlanta and then Brooklyn, New York. He has collaborated with artists including multi-instrumentalist Oren Ambarchi, Joe Stickney of Bear in Heaven, cellist Fred Lonberg-Holm, David Daniell and members of the groups Tortoise and Grizzly Bear. On top of mixing and producing duties, Duncan also provides the majority of the instrumentation of his records, including piano, guitar, bass, cello, Rhodes, melodica, synths, glockenspiel, drums, percussion, and harmonica. He has art directed all of Warm Ghost's music videos and remixed numerous other artists under the moniker Warm Ghost, including Junip, Lotus Plaza, Bear in Heaven and taken a cappella folk pop harmonies from the group Mountain Man and turned it into "electropop." There is no consensus about what genre best describes the band's music, but it has been described by various reviewers as coldwave, electropop, gothic, and chillwave.

== Music reviews ==
Pitchfork reviewer Joshua Love wrote that Duncan's music departed from the chillwave style of artists such as Neon Indian and Washed Out because of Duncan's "sternly romantic voice" which helps give his music a "general smeary, indistinct aesthetic, which is possibly its most alluring strength." A review on Weird Fishes described the Uncut Diamond album positively with "smooth vocals" with songs that are "beautiful and perplexing." Reviewer Brad Knain in Hybrid Magazine described the Uncut Diamond album to be an "electronic treat" that "sounds almost like samples from Bladerunner mixed with The Breakfast Club soundtrack." Reviewer Andrew Duncan from ZapTown Magazine wrote that the music was a "full sound of delightful synth delicacies that never over-cooks a style." A review in ALTsounds described the music as "psychedelic electronic dream pop" which was driven by Duncan's vocal talent.

== Discography ==
- Claws Overhead (EP), 2011, Geographic North
- Uncut Diamond (EP; reissue of Claws Overhead with two bonus tracks), 2011, Partisan Records
- Narrows (LP), 2011, Partisan Records
