= A Comprehensive Retrospective: or How We Learned to Stop Worrying and Release Bad and Useless Recordings =

A Comprehensive Retrospective Or: How We Learned to Stop Worrying and Release Bad and Useless Recordings

Compilation album by Shai Hulud
- Released: January 25, 2005
- Recorded: 1995–1997
- Studio: Studio 13, Deerfield Beach, Florida, United States
- Genre: Hardcore punk; Metalcore
- Length: 65:50
- Label: Revelation; At Dawn We Wage War
- Producer: Jeremy Staska
- Compiler: Matt Fox

Shai Hulud chronology
That Within Blood Ill-Tempered (2003)	A Comprehensive Retrospective Or: How We Learned to Stop Worrying and Release Bad and Useless Recordings (2005)	Misanthropy Pure (2008)

A Comprehensive Retrospective Or: How We Learned to Stop Worrying and Release Bad and Useless Recordings is a compilation album by hardcore punk band Shai Hulud. It is a collection of live recordings and early demos and was co-released via the band's own record label, At Dawn We Wage War Records, in collaboration with Revelation Records, on January 25, 2005. The title is a play on the film Dr. Strangelove or: How I Learned to Stop Worrying and Love the Bomb.

Tracks 1–6 are the original Shai Hulud demo, with Damien Moyal on vocals.

Tracks 7–9 are live recordings from the Crucial Chaos radio show at WNYU in 1997.

Track 10 is a brief recording of Damien Moyal saying, "The end, the end. Stop now. All you're gonna get after this is bullshit."

Track 11 is message left on Matt Fox's answering machine by his friends mocking the fact that the band's name was misspelled on the first 5,000 copies of their EP "A Profound Hatred of Man".

Tracks 12–15 are taken from a practice session in 1995 with Damien Moyal on vocals. Track 16 is a guitar only demo version of "This Wake I Myself Have Stirred".

Tracks 17–19 are demo recordings with Chad Gilbert on vocals. Tracks 20–24 are scratch tracks recorded by Matt Fox in 1995.

== Track listing ==
1. "Hardly" (Shai Hulud demo, Damien Moyal on vocals – 1995) – 3:11
2. "Orwell" (Shai Hulud demo, Damien Moyal on vocals – 1995) – 2:13
3. "Unlearned" (Shai Hulud demo, Damien Moyal on vocals – 1995) – 2:08
4. "Sauve Qui Peut" (Shai Hulud demo, Damien Moyal on vocals – 1995) – 2:38
5. "This Wake I Myself Have Stirred" (Shai Hulud demo, Damien Moyal on vocals – 1995) – 2:45
6. "Favor" (Shai Hulud demo, Damien Moyal on vocals – 1995. Reworked into "Beyond Man") – 3:04
7. "Solely Concentrating On The Negative Aspects Of Life" (Live at NYU, Chad Gilbert on vocals – 1997) – 4:07
8. "Gyroscope" (S.F.A. Cover) (Live at NYU, Chad Gilbert on vocals – 1997) – 1:53
9. "Hardly" (Live at NYU, Chad Gilbert on vocals – 1997) – 4:14
10. "Stop Now"! (Brief miscellaneous ramblings, non Musical) – 0:07
11. "Keep Your Day Jobs" (Brief miscellaneous ramblings, non musical) – 0:52
12. "New Song" (Sauve Qui Peut, For The World, early version) (Warehouse practice – 1995) – 3:07
13. "Tree" (Hardly, early version) (Pre-demo – 1995) – 3:16
14. "This Wake I Myself Have Stirred" (early version) (Pre-demo – 1995) – 2:44
15. "Unlearned" (early version) (Pre-demo – 1995) – 2:11
16. "This Wake I Myself Have Stirred" (Guitar demo, 4 track recording, no vocals – 1996) – 3:02
17. "For The World" (First demo with Chad Gilbert, 4 track recording – 1996) – 3:02
18. "This Wake I Myself Have Stirred" (First demo with Chad Gilbert, 4 track recording – 1996) – 2:54
19. "Hardly" (First demo with Chad Gilbert, 4 track recording – 1996) – 3:28
20. "Unlearned" (Matt Fox scratch tracks, guitar only – 1995) –2;16
21. "100 Acre Wood" (Matt Fox scratch Tracks, guitar only – 1995) – 3:52
22. "Tree (Hardly, early version)" (Matt Fox scratch tracks, guitar only – 1995) – 3:06
23. "This Wake I Myself Have Stirred" (Matt Fox scratch Tracks, guitar only – 1995) – 2:49
24. "Sauve Qui Peut" (For The World, early version) (Matt Fox scratch tracks, guitar only – 1995) – 2:41

== Credits ==
- Oliver Chapoy – guitar (tracks 1–9, 12–19)
- Matt Fox – guitar (tracks 1–9, 12–24)
- Chad Gilbert – voice (tracks 7–9, 17–19)
- Steve Kleisath – drums (tracks 1–9, 17–19)
- Jason Lederman – drums (tracks 12–15)
- Damien Moyal – voice (tracks 1–6, 12–15)
- Dave Silber – bass guitar (tracks 1–9, 12–15, 17–19)
