= The Exquisite Death of Saxon Shore =

- Artwork by Ben Volta

Studio album by Saxon Shore
- Released: October 18, 2005
- Recorded: January–September 2005 at Tarbox Road Studios
- Genre: Post-rock; Instrumental rock Ambient
- Length: 48:36
- Label: Burnt Toast Vinyl
- Producer: Dave Fridmann

Saxon Shore chronology
Luck Will Not Save Us from a Jackpot of Nothing EP (2005)	The Exquisite Death of Saxon Shore (2005)

Professional ratings
Review scores
Source	Rating
Allmusic	3.5/5 stars

The Exquisite Death of Saxon Shore is the third full-length studio album by American post-rock band Saxon Shore. It was produced by Dave Fridmann and released on October 18, 2005, on Burnt Toast Vinyl.

== Track listing ==
No.	Title	Length
1.	"The Revolution Will Be Streaming"	4:17
2.	"This Shameless Moment"	4:16
3.	"With a Red Suit You Will Become a Man"	3:37
4.	"Silence Lends a Face to the Soul"	4:40
5.	"Isolated by the Secrets of Your Fellow Men"	7:09
6.	"The Shaping of a Helpless Joy"	4:52
7.	"Marked with the Knowledge"	3:39
8.	"A Greatness at the Cost of Goodness"	5:48
9.	"How We Conquered the Western World on Horseback"	3:52
10.	"The Lame Shall Enter First"	6:31

== Personnel ==
- Matthew Doty - guitars, keyboards; vocals (track 10)
- Matthew Stone - guitars, keyboards; vocals (track 10)
- Oliver Chapoy - guitars, keyboards; vocals (track 10)
- William Stichter - bass; vocals (track 10)
- Stephen Roessner - drums, percussion; vocals (track 10)

- Steven Googin - vocals (track 10)

== Song notes ==
- "Marked with the Knowledge" was featured in Sony HD television commercials starting late April 2008.
- Their song "This Shameless Moment" was used at the end of episode 3 of Joe Calzaghe vs. Roy Jones, Jr. 24/7 program on HBO. The song is played while you see Roy Jones talking about being a true champion and shadowboxing on a New York rooftop and you see Joe running on the Brooklyn Bridge and talking about how it is his time and that Roy Jones was yesterday and he is today.
