= Misanthropy Pure =

Studio album by Shai Hulud
- Released: May 26, 2008
- Recorded: 2007–2008 at Silver Bullet Studios in Burlington, Connecticut
- Genre: Metalcore; hardcore punk
- Length: 41:53
- Label: Metal Blade
- Producer: Greg Thomas; Matt Fox

Shai Hulud chronology
A Comprehensive Retrospective: or How We Learned to Stop Worrying and Release Bad and Useless Recordings (2005)	Misanthropy Pure (2008)	Not Without a Heart Once Nourished by Sticks and Stones Within Blood Ill-Tempered Misanthropy Pure Gold Can Stay (2009)

Singles from Misanthropy Pure
- 1. "Misanthropy Pure" Released: May 22, 2008

Professional ratings
Review scores
Source	Rating
AbsolutePunk.net	(79%)
Lambgoat	8/10 stars
Scenepointblank	8/10 stars
Wonka Vision	4/5 stars

Misanthropy Pure is the third studio album by hardcore punk band Shai Hulud, released on May 26, 2008 in Europe (except in Germany, Austria, Switzerland and Italy, where it arrived on May 30) and May 27 in the U.S. through Metal Blade Records, the band's first record release by that label. It has been described as the blender between 1997's Hearts Once Nourished with Hope and Compassion and 2003's That Within Blood Ill-Tempered, by Shai Hulud's guitarist, Matt Fox: "We wanted to make it smart, and heavy, we wanna make it sound great. We wanted to give something to people where they could groove along to it and rock for more than a second and a half without changing, but we also wanted to maintain some technical intelligent aspect, and the melodic nature of our last album. So if you take both those albums, throw them in a blender, I think you might have something that resembles 'Misanthrophy Pure'.

== Release ==
The single "Misanthropy Pure" was accompanied by a music video, first shown on MTV2's Headbangers Ball on May 22, 2008. It was directed by David Brodsky. It features text-treatments of many of the song's lyrics.

== Track listing ==
No.	Title	Length
1.	"Venomspreader"	1:45
2.	"The Creation Ruin"	3:16
3.	"Misanthropy Pure"	4:28
4.	"We Who Finish Last"	3:08
5.	"Chorus of the Dissimilar"	3:34
6.	"In the Mind and Marrow"	4:47
7.	"To Bear the Brunt of Many Blades"	3:35
8.	"Four Earths"	5:10
9.	"Set Your Body Ablaze"	3:20
10.	"Be Winged"	2:15
11.	"Cold Lord Quietus"	6:35

== Credits ==
- Matt Mazzali - vocals
- Matt Fox - guitar, producer
- Matthew Fletcher - bass guitar
- Andrew Gormley - drums
- Greg Thomas - engineer, producer
- Dave Quiggle - artwork
- Recorded at Silver Bullet Studios in Burlington, CT
- Mixed by Eric Rachel at Trax East

== Release history ==
Country	Release date
Europe	May 26, 2008
United States	May 27, 2008
Worldwide	May 30, 2008
