= In at the Deep End Records =

British record label

In at the Deep End Records (IATDE), founded 2000, is an independent record label based on the outskirts of Nottingham, England. The label specialises in hardcore punk and heavy metal music genres.

== History ==
The label was founded in 2000 driven by the love of the then Hardcore scene in the UK by the person behind the UKbase project (UK hardcore and punk website). Based on the outskirts of Nottingham, IATDE issued their first release Amped Up in 2002. It was a compilation record of thirty bands of various style including punk, metal, hardcore and emo (some that had featured on UKbase). In the same year, the label's third release was a Beecher record. Beecher, a five-piece mathcore band from Manchester.

In 2006, the label released Gallows debut album Orchestra Of Wolves. Three years later the band signed to Warner Music who then re-release the Album with Bonus tracks then followed up Grey Britain.

IATDE has released debut albums for a number of UK based hardcore and metal bands; including Architects, Feed The Rhino, Sylosis and from the USA Suicide Silence.

== Discography ==
2002

- Various artists - Amped Up Compilation (2002, IATDE 001)
- The Osterman Weekend - S/T EP (2002, IATDE 002)
- Beecher - 'Resention Is A Big Word In A Small Town' EP (2002, IATDE 003)
- Beecher - 'Beecher / The Leif Ericsson' EP (2002, IATDE 004)
- Lovejunk - 'Vodatumor Blues' EP (2002, IATDE 005)
- The Killerest Espression - 'Four Days That Shocked The World' Mini Album (2002, IATDE 006)
- Send More Paramedics - 'A Feast For The Fallen' Album (2002, IATDE 007)
- And None of Them Knew They were Robots - Liebestod EP (2002, IATDE 008)

2003

- The Devils - 'How I Learned To Stop Worrying And Forget The Bomb' Album (2003, IATDE 010)
- Dandare - 'Define It, Defeat It' Album (2002, IATDE 011)
- Steel Rules Die - 'Nostalgia For Beginners' Mini Album (2003, IATDE 012)
- Buzzkill - 'Double Down' Mini Album (2003, IATDE 013)
- The Wireless Stores - 'Historic Site Of Scenic Beauty #1' EP (2003, IATDE 014)
- Hitechjet - 'If You Take Anything' Mini Album (2003, IATDE 015)

2004

- The Once Over Twice - 'Special Moments To Detonate Themselves' Album (2004, IATDE 016)
- Send More Paramedics - 'The Hallowed & The Heathen' Album (2004, IATDE 017)
- November Coming Fire - 'Black Ballads' Album (2003, IATDE 018)
- Th Letters Organize - 'The Cure' EP (2004, IATDE 019)
- Bait - 'Antomy Of Disaster' Album (2004, IATDE 020)
- Everything For Some - 'A Thought Refused' Album (2004, IATDE 021)

2005

- The Nothing - 'Coma Poems' Album (2005, IATDE 022)
- Hitechjet - '600 Miles from...' Album (2005, IATDE 023)
- Send More Paramedics/ Zombie Apocalypse - 'Tales Told By Dead Men' EP (2005, IATDE 024)
- Buzzkill - 'Driven By Loss' Album (2005, IATDE 025)
- Love That Kills - '..To Cruel Nails Surrendered' EP (2006, IATDE 026)
- The Break In - 'Unbowed' Album (2005, IATDE 027)

2006

- Suicide Silence - 'Suicide Silence' EP (2006, IATDE 028 & IATDE 028B )
- The Wireless Stores - 'Dust Ghosts' Album (2006, IATDE 029)
- Architects - 'Nightmares' Album (2006, IATDE 030) (Licensed to *Distort Records in North America)
- Send More Paramedics - 'The Awakening' Album (2006, IATDE 031)
- Gallows - 'Orchestra Of Wolves' Album (2006, IATDE 032, later reissued by Warner Brothers)
- Sylosis - 'Casting Shadows' EP (2006, IATDE 033)

2007

- Shaped by Fate - 'The Unbeliever' Album (2007, IATDE 035)
- Centurion - One Hundred EP (2007, IATDE 037)
- Sylosis - 'The Supreme Oppressor' EP (2007, IATDE 039)

2008

- Romeo Must Die - 'Defined By Enemies' Album (2008, IATDE 040)

2009

- Tortuga - 'Kings Of Albany' Album (2009, IATDE 041)
- Casino Brawl - Shades ; Directions Album (2009, IATDE 042)
- The Defiled - 1888 EP (2009, IATDE 043)

2010

- Feed The Rhino - Mr. Red Eye Album (2010, IATDE 044)

2011

- Breaking The Day - Survived By None Album (2011, IATDE 045)
- Bastions - 'Hospital Corners' Album (2011, IATDE 047) (one of Kerrang!''s top 100 albums of 2012)

2012

- Feed The Rhino - 'Burning Sons' Album (2012, IATDE 048)
- Aurora - Easily Broken EP (2012, IATDE 049)
- Send More Paramedics / Gallows / Feed The Rhino / Wounds - 'Unearthed / Possessed Ltd 10" Red Vinyl (2012, IATDE 050)
- History Of The Hawk - 'Future Ruins' Album (2012, IATDE 051)
- Departures - 'Teenage Haze' Album (2012, IATDE 052) (Licensed to No Sleep Records in North America)

2013

- Wounds - Die Young Album (2013, IATDE 055)
- Weathered Hands - Of All The People That I’ve Left, Each One Has Died Of Loneliness - EP (2013, IATDE 056)
- Death Remains - Stand.Fight.Believe Album (2013, IATDE 058)
- Black Shapes - Sleep,Sleep,Sleep Album (2013, IATDE 059)

2014

- Weathered Hands - A Warm Life in the Cold Album (2014, IATDE 060)
- Polar - Shadowed by Vultures (2014, IATDE 061)
- Pay No Respect - Hope for the Hopeless EP (2014, IATDE 062)
- Cavorts - Got The Brass Album (2014, IATDE 063)

2015

- Prolong The Agony - All We Are EP (2015, IATDE 064)
- Palm Reader - Besides The Ones We Love Album (2015, IATDE 065)
- Aurora - Faith/Breaker (2015, IATDE 066)

== Reception ==
IATDE has been favorably reviewed by Kerrang Magazine, Metal Hammer Magazine, Terrorizer Magazine, Mass Movement Magazine, and Rockhound Magazine.
