= The Black Atlantic (band) =

Dutch acoustic pop band

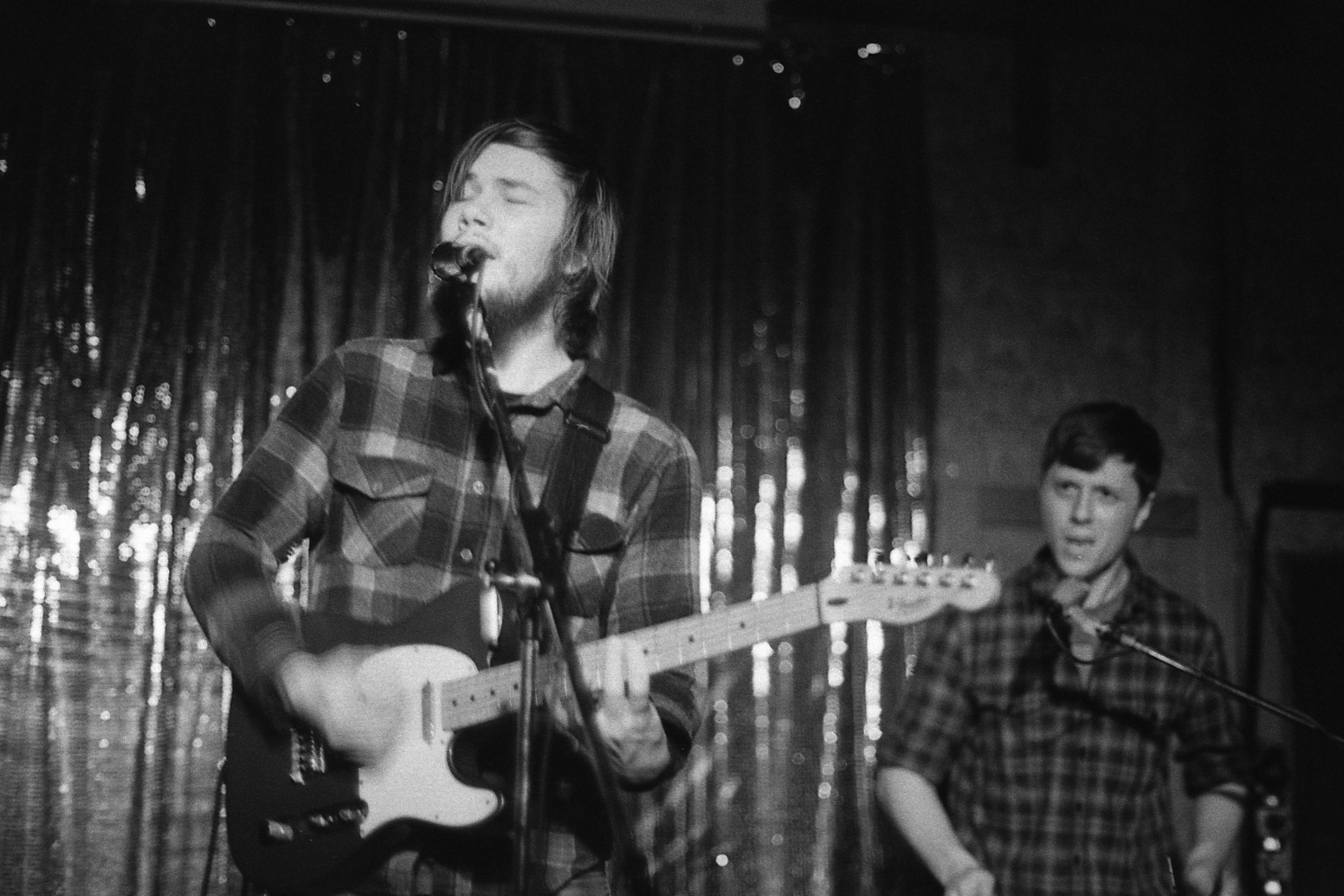
- Performing in Berlin, 2009

Background information
- Origin: Groningen, Netherlands
- Genres: Indie, Pop, Ambient, Folk
- Years active: 2006-Present
- Labels: Beep! Beep! Back up the Truck, Midsummer, Five Point, Haldern Pop Recordings
- Members: Geert van der Velde
- Past members: Megan Hoffman; Kim Janssen; Matthijs Herder; Simon van der Heide; Stef Thoen; Menno Vos; Jurgen Hakkeling; Sander Bos; Robert Koole; Arjen de Bock
- Website: theblackatlantic.com

The Black Atlantic is a Dutch acoustic pop band formed around singer-songwriter Geert van der Velde, former vocalist for the American hardcore band Shai Hulud.

== History ==
The Black Atlantic is a Groningen-based acoustic pop band formed around singer and songwriter Geert van der Velde, former frontman for American metalcore group Shai Hulud. The Black Atlantic released their debut album “Reverence for Fallen Trees” digitally for free (worldwide) on August 21, 2009. It has since been downloaded close to 100,000 times via various torrent websites, the band's own website and its label Beep! Beep! Back Up the Truck.

=== “Reverence for Fallen Trees” ===
In February, 2008, the Black Atlantic started recording their album in a cabin owned by van der Velde's in-laws, located in the small town of Saranac Lake, in the heart of the Adirondack Mountains of upstate New York. For this recording, drummer Marcel Wolthof was re-enlisted alongside singer-songwriter Kim Janssen on various instruments. Janssen co-wrote some of the songs for the recording and has permanently settled in and joined the band. The band took a large part of these recordings back home to the Netherlands where they finished the album over the course of Spring 2009 and early Summer at the (now defunct) Paperboat recording studio in Zwolle.

The title of the album "Reverence for Fallen Trees" is a metaphor for "honour the dead" alluding to van der Velde's grandparents, three of whom died during the recording process. The album deals with these topics - ‘remembrance’, ‘grief’, ‘family’, ‘love’, ‘disenchantment’ - in a roundabout way, mostly through the use of natural metaphors .

Musically the album showcases a wide variety of instrumentation with a penchant for ambience and an abundance of melancholy, multi-layered vocal harmonies; inspired by such acts as Bon Iver, Fleet Foxes and the Beach Boys. Rhythmically the band's approach is minimalist and percussive rather than expansive; the band tours with only a snare drum, floor tom and ride cymbal.

=== Touring ===
The Black Atlantic started as a project of van der Velde in his off time from his philosophy studies. Gradually the project turned more serious after van der Velde recorded his first song - a Valentine's gift to his then girlfriend, now wife (and sometimes bandmember) - in February 2006. After posting the song on Myspace van der Velde received some label interest and wrote and recorded ‘Send This Home’ in the early Fall of 2006 with the help of various contributing friends. He eventually abandoned his studies to focus full-time on the band. The EP documents van der Velde's very first attempts at writing pop music, and showcases his preferred melancholy and introspective delivery. The EP was released on July 10, 2007, in the US by Five Point Records (NY); one of the two indie labels who had initially offered a deal. And, in January 2008, ‘Send This Home’ EP was released in Europe through Midsummer Records (DE).

== Members ==
=== Members ===
- Geert van der Velde (lead vocals, guitar, ukulele, piano, percussion)

=== Past members ===
- Megan Hoffman (vocals, flute, glockenspiel, melodica, auxiliary percussion)
- Kim Janssen (vocal harmonies, guitar, ukulele, piano, percussion)
- Simon van der Heide (drums, vocal harmonies)
- Stef Thoen (percussion, piano, vocals)
- Menno Vos (drums)
- Jurgen Hakkeling (bass)
- Sander Bos (piano, keys)
- Dennis Hemstra (bass)
- Arjen de Bock (piano, keys)
- Matthijs Herder (vocal harmonies, bass, piano, keyboard)
- Robert Koole (drums)
- Marcel Wolthof (drums)
- Daniel Öhman (bass, guitar, samples)
- Johan Kooi (piano, keys, vocal harmonies)
- Rienk Bakker (piano)

== Discography ==
- Send This Home (2007) EP
- Madagascar (2007) Digital single
- Reverence for Fallen Trees (2009) Album
- Darkling, I Listen (2012) EP
- Enshrine (2013) EP
