= A Whole New Level of Sickness =

EP by Shai Hulud and Another Victim
- Released: (United States) June 27, 2000 (European Union) April 1, 2000
- Recorded: March 1999
- Studio: Studio 13, Deerfield Beach, Florida, Max Trax in Albany, New York
- Genre: Metalcore; Hardcore punk Crossover thrash
- Length: 16:48
- Label: Trustkill, Good Life Recordings
- Producer: Jeremy Staska; Shai Hulud

Shai Hulud chronology
Hearts Once Nourished with Hope and Compassion (1998)	A Whole New Level of Sickness (2000)	Crush 'Em All Vol. 1 (2000)

A Whole New Level of Sickness is a split EP featuring songs by hardcore punk bands Shai Hulud and Another Victim, released on June 27, 2000, on Trustkill Records and, in Europe, Good Life Recordings, in CD and 12" various colors from brown swirl to purple (150 pressed). Shai Hulud tracks were included in A Profound Hatred of Man (reissue). It also is the debut of Jared Allen and Geert van der Velde.

It was given a three-star rating by Punknews.org.

== Track listing ==
1. "Set Your Body Ablaze" – 3:40 (Shai Hulud)
2. "Anesthesia" (Bad Religion cover) – 2:46 (Shai Hulud)
3. "Linoleum" (NOFX cover) – 2:08 (Shai Hulud)
4. "Bitter End" – 2:49 (Another Victim)
5. "Boiling Point" (SSD cover) – 1:40 (Another Victim)
6. "Free In Constraint" – 2:48 (Another Victim)
7. "Untitled Track" – 0:58 (Another Victim, Shai Hulud)

- The Untitled Track is not a real song; it is various members of both bands screaming the word "burn" for 58 seconds.

== Personnel ==
=== Shai Hulud line-up ===
- Jared Allen – bass guitar
- Matt Fletcher – guitar
- Matt Fox – guitar
- Spikey Goldbach – drums
- Geert van der Velde – voice

Tracks were recorded and mixed by Shai Hulud and Jeremy Staska.
