= Shai Hulud =

American metalcore band

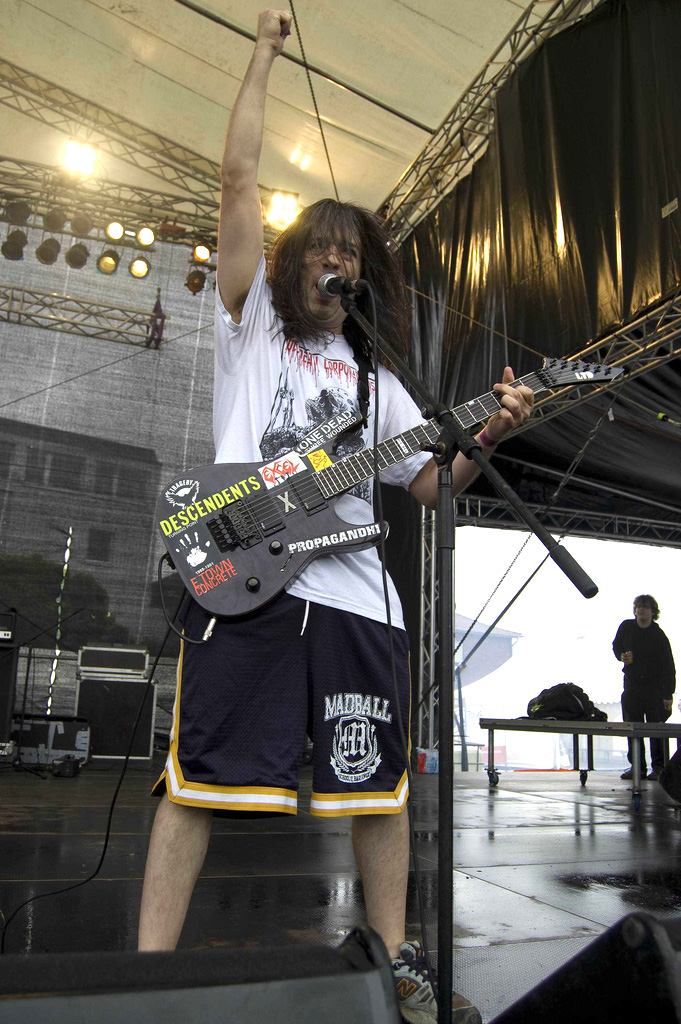
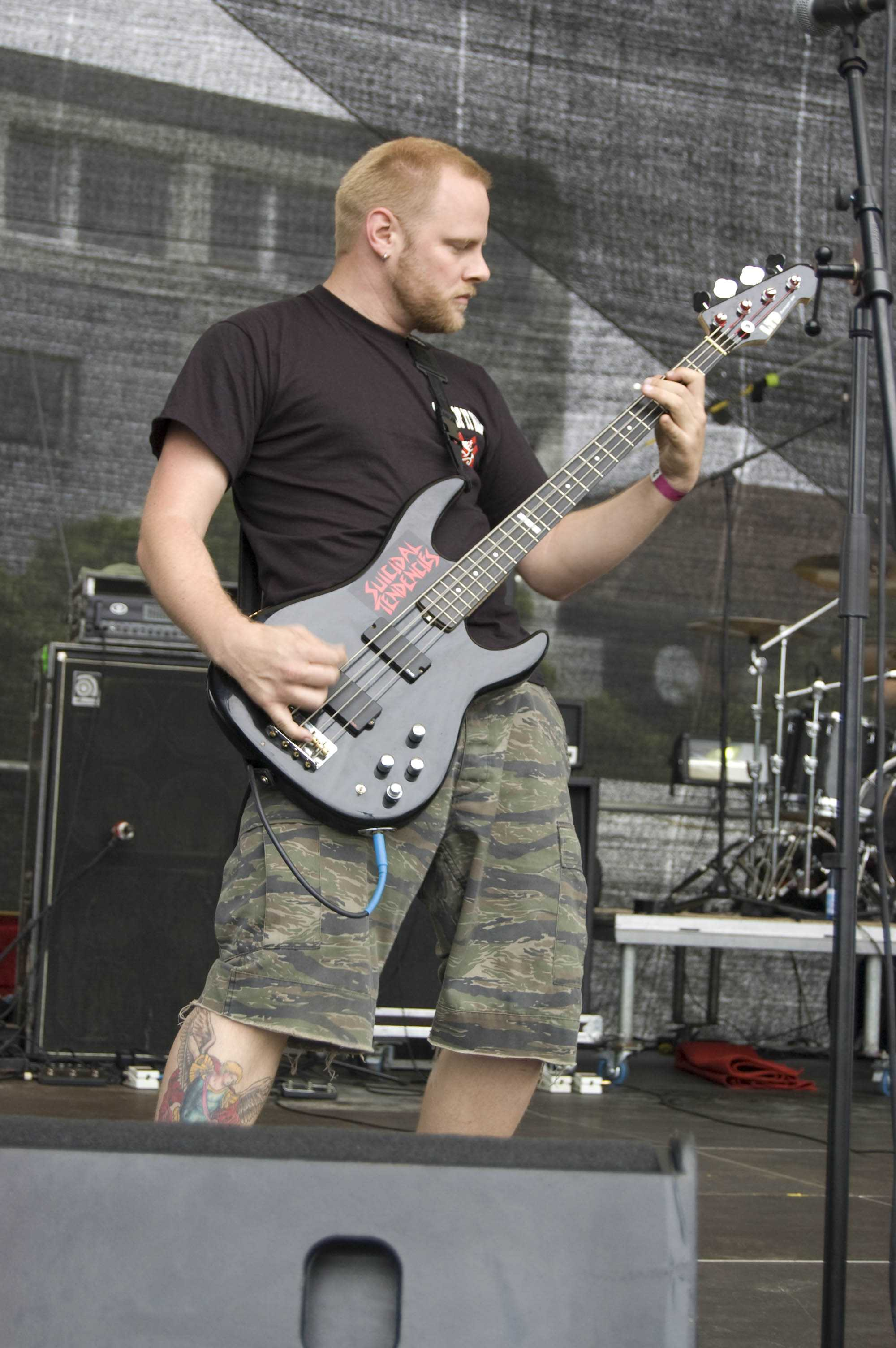
- Matt Fox (left) and Matt Fletcher performing in 2008

Background information
- Also known as: The Warmth of Red Blood; The Worm; Harkonnen
- Origin: Pompano Beach, Florida, U.S.
- Genres: Metalcore; hardcore punk; melodic hardcore
- Works: Shai Hulud discography
- Years active: 1995–present
- Labels: Metal Blade; Revelation; Crisis; Trustkill; Ides of March; Undecided; Century Media; Bridge 9; At Dawn We Wage War
- Members: Matt Fox "Mad" Matt Fletcher; Geert van der Velde; Eric Dellon; Moe Watson; Mark Gumbrecht
- Past members: See band members section
- Website: hulud.com

Shai Hulud is an American metalcore/hardcore band formed in Pompano Beach, Florida, in 1995, and later based in Poughkeepsie, New York. The band is named after the giant sandworms in Frank Herbert's novel Dune.

The two mainstay members of Shai Hulud are considered to be Matt Fox (guitar), who writes most of the band's musical and lyrical output, and Matt Fletcher (originally guitar, now bass), who assists in writing.

== History ==
=== Early years (1995–1997) ===
Matt Fox (guitar) and Dave Silber (bass) formed Shai Hulud in 1995 with Damien Moyal (formerly of Culture) on vocals, Jason Lederman on drums, and Oliver Chapoy on guitar. "Matt was playing in several other kinds of bands like rock bands and they just wanted to play some hardcore" says former bassist Jared Allen. However, things with Jason Lederman didn't work out and the band began to look for a new drummer. This, unfortunately, would be something the band would become accustomed to. In 1994, Steve Kleisath and Matt Fox met for the first time in Tampa, FL, when Matt was filling in on drums for Strongarm, the band Steve later joined as drummer. With a complete lineup intact, the band recorded a six-song demo and was soon signed to Revelation Records by Rob Moran, bass player of Unbroken, who received their demo from Jeanne Probart, a friend that worked in Revelation's mail-order department. Although Revelation loved the Shai Hulud demo, they asked the band to change the name because they thought "it was too difficult to remember". Shai Hulud's first show was a Halloween party, played on October 31, 1995, at Discount's warehouse for under 50 people.

Moyal quit the band shortly after the band signed to Revelation Records in early 1996 and went on to play in Morning Again, Bird of Ill Omen and As Friends Rust. With Moyal's exit, Shai Hulud recruited fourteen year old Chad Gilbert on vocals; Gilbert had been recommended by Moyal at the time of his departure. The band had a record deal with Revelation Records' subsidiary, Crisis Records. In September 1996, they recorded a three-song EP called A Profound Hatred Of Man which was released in February 1997. On the first 5000 copies of their debut EP, the band's name is misspelled on the spine as, "Shai Halud", but spelled correctly on the cover.

=== Hearts Once Nourished with Hope and Compassion (1997–2003) ===
Chad Gilbert departed to found the pop punk band New Found Glory in 1997. This would pose problems for Shai Hulud in the future. However, they started recording their first full-length, Hearts Once Nourished with Hope and Compassion, in August 1997. They would finish the album in September and release it in November. Throughout the next year and a half Shai Hulud toured America with Strongarm, Bloodlet, Shadows Fall, Zao, Overcast, Cannibal Corpse and Disembodied. A limited edition vinyl of the album was released in 2006, and featured a cover painting by Dan Henk.

In May 1998 three tracks were recorded for a split with New York's Indecision entitled The Fall of Every Man. The split was released in November 1998. As Shai Hulud's popularity grew some of the band's members' interest began to wane. In January 1999, Oliver Chapoy decided to leave the band. He was replaced by Matthew Fletcher who later moved to Florida to join the band in February 1999. Matt Fletcher had seen Shai Hulud for the first time in Seattle, Washington in 1997 with Strongarm and NineIronSpitFire. Andrew Gormley (future Shai Hulud drummer) was also at the show selling Kiss It Goodbye demos. Poison the Well drummer Chris Hornbrook filled in for a single show in February 1999 before Gormley joined. In June 1999, they recorded a cover of "Fearless Vampire Killers" for the Bad Brains tribute compilation called Never Give In.

Steve Kleisath quit the band due to personal issues, and Chad Gilbert decided to leave Shai Hulud and become a full-time guitar player for the band New Found Glory. The band forged ahead and recruited Andrew Gormley to fill in as drummer on a European tour. Matt Fletcher filled in as singer until Geert van der Velde joined the band during the tour. The band returned to Florida determined to continue Shai Hulud. However, Dave Silber had been ready to quit and did so upon their return. In January 2000, Jared Allen, Matt Fletcher's friend from Oklahoma, would fill in the bass player position and quickly joined the band in the studio. Three tracks would be recorded for a split with the band Another Victim named A Whole New Level of Sickness. This and another split, honoring Metallica, were both released in March 2000. Shai Hulud shared the Metallica tribute split, named Crush 'Em All Vol. 1, with Boy Sets Fire, covering the song Damage Inc. Spikey Goldbach would fill in as drummer for the A Whole New Level Of Sickness split and Steve Kleisath would return for the sole track on the Crush 'Em All Vol. 1 split for Undecided Records. In April 2000, the band relocated to Poughkeepsie, NY. Chris Cardinal (drummer) joined the band in April of 2000, after returning to the states from a European tour with his band Inner Dam. He did play on the Hellfest 2000 DVD put out by Trustkill Records. While writing That Within Blood Ill-Tempered, in the fall of 2001, he decided to leave the band for personal reasons.

=== That Within Blood Ill-Tempered (2003–2006) ===
In 2002, Jared Allen decided to leave the band, and Matt Fletcher moved on to bass. The band recorded a second full-length That Within Blood Ill-Tempered, released on May 20, 2003. The album peaked at number 39 on the Billboard Top Independent albums chart, without any video or radio airplay. Throughout the creation of the new album, the band continued to search for a permanent drummer. Tony Tintari joined the band in the studio while recording the new album. After the release of That Within Blood Ill-Tempered, Shai Hulud picked up guitarist Matt Canning and embarked on a number of international tours. After some time, Shai Hulud and vocalist Geert van der Velde mutually decided it was for the best he leave the band. Geert left and soon thereafter started his solo project The Black Atlantic, and to join as vocalist for the metalcore band Miscreants. Drummer Tony Tintari left the band to join the indie rock band Holy Roman Empire. Guitarist Matt Canning left the band to start The Twilight Collective. Andrew Gormley rejoined on drums for some time and the band played a series of shows with Chad Gilbert on vocals before taking a hiatus to regroup. Acknowledging some people may misinterpret the parting as the end of Shai Hulud, the band came out on their homepage indicating that they would not be breaking up; instead, the band would change name to "The Warmth of Red Blood" and continue what had been started with Shai Hulud. They started requesting that anyone who considered themselves up for the challenge of taking over vocal duties record a demo of themselves performing the track "Whether to Cry or Destroy" (quite similar to what The Dillinger Escape Plan did when auditioning new vocalists). In 2005, the band co-released (via their own record label At Dawn We Wage War Records and Revelation Records) a retrospective release entitled, A Comprehensive Retrospective: or How We Learned to Stop Worrying and Release Bad and Useless Recordings containing rare demos and live tracks!

=== Misanthropy Pure (2006–2009) ===
In early 2006, the band recorded a three song rough demo with Eric Dellon on lead vocals and drums, featuring former vocalist Geert van der Velde on backup vocals. In March 2006, the band announced they were abandoning the moniker "The Warmth of Red Blood" and keeping the name Shai Hulud. In August 2006, the band signed with Metal Blade Records. The band recorded their third full-length album Misanthropy Pure at Silver Bullet Media in Connecticut with Matt Mazzali on vocals and Andrew Gormley on drums; the album features additional vocalists such as J Costa of Thy Will Be Done. Released on May 27, 2008, the album peaked at number 35 on the Billboard Top Independent albums chart and 15 on the Top Heatseekers chart. For a number of months, Shai Hulud enlisted the help of former Unearth & The Red Chord drummer Mike Justain up until he joined the band Trap Them. The position of second guitar was filled by Chad Kishick of Miami, Florida, until 2009 when he left the band. Geert Van der Velde temporally returned as vocalist for the band for the 2009 Japan tour, with Parkway Drive and Crystal Lake.

The band released a split EP with New Found Glory titled Not Without a Heart Once Nourished by Sticks and Stones Within Blood Ill-Tempered Misanthropy Pure Gold Can Stay being sold only at the "Not Without a Fight" tour. There are two colors limited to a total of only 500 copies and only for sale from either Shai Hulud or New Found Glory at these shows.

=== Reach Beyond the Sun (2011–present) ===
On January 26, 2011, the band announced that they would embark on a 17-day US tour, beginning on the February 2, 2011 to the 19. Shai Hulud is currently in the studio recording a new album. Which is being produced by former vocalist and guitarist of New Found Glory: Chad Gilbert. More recently, August 9, 2012, the band has been announced as an artist touring Australia as part of the annual Soundwave Festival. Details on who will be performing vocals for this tour have yet to be released. They will complete the Australian tour with the festival in early to mid March 2013. The band has also expressed interest in completing as many Sidewaves as possible, shows which would see them play in smaller and more personal venues than the festival itself. Along with this comes a statement via Facebook suggesting that they will be returning to Australia once again, after this festival has been completed, perhaps for the launch tour of their forthcoming album. On September 13, 2012, Matt Fox announced that not only did former member Chad Gilbert produce their forthcoming album, he also supplied the vocals for it as well. On November 19, the band announced the new album's name, Reach Beyond the Sun and a 30-second teaser on YouTube. In December 2015, the band released an EP entitled Just Can't Hate Enough.

== Artistry ==
=== Genre ===
The band is known within the hardcore scene for their affecting, well-written lyrics, whose themes range from misanthropy, hatred, human psychology to hope and compassion, and their often complex compositions, utilizing elements of hardcore punk, heavy, thrash and progressive metal.

Shai Hulud was one of the first hardcore/metal crossover band that used the term "metalcore" to describe their music (as shown in the back cover of That Within Blood Ill-Tempered) and by some fans the band is still considered to be "a true metalcore band", while others, including band members have discarded the term due to their current meaning, e.g., the melodic death metal influenced metalcore, when this genre became a commercial success in early 2000s as "metalcore" and it differed from what the band was playing at that time.

Taking the term literally, and breaking it apart, yes, we definitely are a true example of 'metalcore,' a hybrid of hardcore and metal. When we used to joke with the term, it was just a clever (or not so clever) way of describing a metallic hardcore, metal-influenced hardcore, or hardcore-influenced metal band. My friends and I would listen to Deadguy and say 'this isn't HARDcore, it's METALcore,' which made sense based on the music they played, combined with the attitude and ethic of the band. Same thing used to be said for Earth Crisis, Integrity, Coalesce, Unbroken, and a lot of the 90s bands that incorporated heavier riffs and more progressive structuring and ideas into their songs. When the term 'metalcore' was thrown around back then it was very tongue-in-cheek; this, obviously, long before it became a legitimate genre, it's [sic] current legitimacy being highly debatable, of course. 'Metalcore,' the actual genre in 2008 doesn't usually seem like a hybrid of hardcore and metal as much as it just seems like metal, only written by people who imitate it rather than love it, typically resulting in trite and shallow music. If this accurately describes 'metalcore' then we clearly do not embrace the term. Conversely, if Earth Crisis and Deadguy define 'metalcore,' count us in.

— Matt Fox

In a more recent interview Fox stated that "progressive hardcore" was the best way to describe the band, rather that stick to a one specific genre.

=== Influences and legacy ===
They cite their influences as Earth Crisis, Deadguy, Turning Point, Chain of Strength, Uniform Choice, Dead Kennedys, J.F.A., Metallica, Testament, Megadeth, Exodus, Forbidden, Coroner, Celtic Frost, Nuclear Assault, Dead Brain Cells, Raw Power, Burn, NOFX, S.F.A., Strongarm, Embodiment 12:14, and Voivod.

Shai Hulud has become a very influential band in the underground hardcore, metalcore and post-hardcore scene. Bands like 7 Angels 7 Plagues, Alove for Enemies, As Hope Dies, As I Lay Dying, Misery Signals, Mychildren Mybride, Poison the Well, See You Next Tuesday, Silverstein, Funeral for a Friend, Counterparts, Hundredth, It Prevails, the Funeral Pyre, the Banner and Unearth, have cited Shai Hulud as an influence.

=== Religion and beliefs ===
Shai Hulud is neither a Christian band nor straight edge, as stated by the band:

You guys are neither a Straight Edge or a Christian band, but you often get labeled as such. Why?

Well you've got Chad who's Christian; you have Steve who was in Strongarm who's Christian. You also have Chad who's SXE. Then there's me who doesn't smoke, drink or do drugs. So I guess you could call me SXE, but I don't usually say anything. It's just something I've always been. That's mainly the reason, but you have 3 members who drink, 1 that smokes, 2 who believe in God, 3 that don't. So if you want to call us Christian or SXE, fine. We're not.

— Matt Fox

== Side projects ==
=== Zombie Apocalypse ===
Shai Hulud started a crossover thrash /metalcore side project called Zombie Apocalypse (formerly called Boddicker). It features Matt Fox, Matthew Fletcher, Ronen Kaufman (vocals for try.fail.try; vocals for The Hostage), Eric Dellon and Greg Thomas.

In 1998, Shai Hulud members Matt Fox and Chad Gilbert created a zombie-themed band project, called Boddicker. They recruited ex-Poison the Well guitarist Russel Saunders. Boddicker recorded a two-song demo in 1998 that was never released. The band released their debut album This Is a Spark of Life in 2003 and Tales Told by Dead Men in 2005, split EP with Send More Paramedics.

Their music is characterized by very short, thrashcore-like, fast songs thematically concerned with zombies and the apocalypse, as the band name would imply. Their lyrics have a political undercurrent that uses horrific imagery as a metaphor to touch on various political, personal, and social issues. They have released two albums: This Is a Spark of Life, on Indecision Records and featuring artwork by Dan Henk, and a split with Leeds, UK-based, and fellow zombie enthusiasts, Send More Paramedics, called Tales Told by Dead Men, released in North America on Hell Bent Records and in Europe on In at the Deep End Records. They also contributed a cover of "Welcome to the Jungle" to a Guns N' Roses tribute album released by Reignition Records.

In an interview with Lambgoat Matt Fox revealed that the band planned to release an album, and some songs have been already written and a title decided. However, due to scheduling conflicts he was uncertain when the record would be completed. In 2019, they released Life Without Pain Is a Fucking Fantasy.

=== The Fremen Warriors ===
The Fremen Warriors (another reference to Dune) are a group who provide the backing vocals on all of Shai Hulud's releases. Their names are not listed in any of the liner notes, but on the song "Faithless Is He Who Says Farewell When The Road Darkens," they consisted of Aaron Bedard, Nick Brunson, Nicole Prizio, Kelly Reaves, and Paul Romanko.

== Band members ==
Current members

- Matt Fox – guitar, backing vocals (1995–present)
- "Mad" Matt Fletcher – bass (2002–present; studio only 2013–present), guitar (1999–2002), lead vocals (1999)
- Moe Watson – drums (2015–present)
- Mark Gumbrecht – guitar (2013–2015, 2019–present)
- Geert van der Velde – lead vocals (1999–2003, 2003–2005, 2024-present; touring 2009)

Current touring musicians

- Eric Dellon – bass, backing vocals (2020–present), lead vocals, drums (2005–2006; official member)
- Daniel Pouliot – drums (2025-present)

Former members

- Damien Moyal – lead vocals (1995–1996)
- Dave Silber – bass (1995–1999)
- Jason Lederman – drums (1995)
- Oliver Chapoy – guitar (1996–1998)
- Chad Gilbert – lead vocals (1996–1998, 2004; touring, 2012–2013, Died 2026)
- Steve Kleisath – drums (1996–1999)
- Chris Hornbrook – drums (1999)
- Andrew Gormley – drums (1999–2000, 2004–2005, 2006–2008)
- Spikey Goldbach – drums (2000–2001)
- Jared Allen – bass (2000–2002)
- Chris Cardinal – drums (2002)
- Tony Tintari – drums (2002–2004, 2024)
- Donny Ruckdeschel - drums (2014–2015, 2020)
- Derek Oster – Triangle (2013)
- Dane Metcalfe – guitar (2003)
- Matt Canning – guitar (2003–2006)
- Matt Mazzali – lead vocals (2006–2009, 2015)
- Gregory Thomas – guitar (2007–2008)
- Chaz Kishick – guitar (2008–2009)
- Mike Shaw - guitar (2009-2010, 2025)
- Dylan Spero - oboe (2009)
- Tim O'Leary – guitar (2009–2010)
- Liam Dunlop – cymbal (2011)
- Ron Vassallo – bass (2011)
- Matt Covey – drums (2009–2013)
- Mike Moynihan – lead vocals (2009–2012)
- Justin Kraus – lead vocals (2013–2014)
- Jay Pepito – lead vocals (2020–2024)

Former touring musicians

- Steve Bucala – guitar (2002)
- Pierce Webster – lead vocals (2003–2004)
- Ryan Burns – guitar (2005–2006)
- Brian Go – drums (2006)
- Shane Shook - drums (2008)
- Jeff Lohrber - drums (2008)
- Mike Justian – drums (2009)
- Aaron Goodrich – drums (2009–2010)
- Steve Muczynski – bass (2009–2010, 2013) (died 2023)
- Tony DelMonego – guitar (2011–2012)
- Justin Shepp – bass (2012–2013)
- Thomas "Tam-Tam" Colello – guitar (2012–2014)
- Nathan Gluck – bass (2013)
- Rick Maldonado – bass (2013)
- Eric English – bass (2013–2014)
- Dave Joyal – drums (2013–2015)
- Sean Bearhope - bass (2013)
- Billy Nottke – bass (2014–2015)
- Mike "Chez" Sanchez – bass (2015)
- Eddie Collins – guitar (2015)
- John Abernathy – guitar (2015)
- Dustin Albright – bass (2015–2016)
- Stefan Hojnacki – guitar (2016)
- Mary Carlock – lead vocals (2016)
- Joshua Lozano – guitar (2016–2019)
- "Mean" Pete Kowalsky – lead vocals (2016–2020)

== Discography ==
=== Studio albums ===
- Hearts Once Nourished with Hope and Compassion (1997)
- That Within Blood Ill-Tempered (2003)
- Misanthropy Pure (2008)
- Reach Beyond the Sun (2013)
