= Hearts Once Nourished with Hope and Compassion =

Studio album by Shai Hulud
- Released: November 4, 1997
- Recorded: August–September 1997 at Morrisound Recording, Tampa, Florida
- Genres: Hardcore punk; metalcore; melodic hardcore
- Length: 34:52
- Labels: Crisis; Revelation
- Producer: Shai Hulud

Shai Hulud chronology
A Profound Hatred of Man (1997)	Hearts Once Nourished with Hope and Compassion (1997)	A Whole New Level of Sickness (2000)

Alternative Cover
- 2006 Reissue cover.

12" Picture disc
- Special picture disc LP

Singles from Hearts Once Nourished with Hope and Compassion
- 1. "My Heart Bleeds the Darkest Blood" Released: 1997

Professional ratings
Review scores
Source	Rating
Allmusic	4.5/5 stars
Punknews.org	3.5/5 stars

Hearts Once Nourished with Hope and Compassion is the first full-length album by American hardcore punk band Shai Hulud, released on November 4, 1997, on Crisis Records. Hearts Once Nourished with Hope and Compassion received positive reviews and became very influential in the emerging metalcore scene of the late 1990s.

A fan music video was made for "My Heart Bleeds the Darkest Blood" in 1998, during the US tour with Overcast.

The album was remixed and released as an enhanced with new artwork on August 29, 2006. The enhanced features are the original releases' MP3s, before the remastering process.

In 2020, John Hill of Loudwire included the album in his list of the "Top 25 Metalcore Albums of All Time."

== Production ==
Shai Hulud started recording the album in August 1997 and finished the process in September. The album's title name comes from the lyrics of "Outside the Boundaries of a Friend", My heart, once nourished with hope and compassion, now is black as death.

Many movie samples were used. One of them is played at the end of "Solely Concentrating on the Negative Aspects of Life", in which Bill Murray is heard saying "It's gonna be cold. It's gonna be gray. And it's gonna last you for the rest of your life" from the 1993 film Groundhog Day. Sigourney Weaver in Alien (1979) is heard at the end of the record saying, "This is Lieutenant Ripley, last survivor of the Nostromo, signing off."

Early versions of "Beyond Man" ("Favor") and "For the World" ("Sauve Qui Peut" (Save Yourself, in literal translation from French) are found in A Comprehensive Retrospective: or How We Learned to Stop Worrying and Release Bad and Useless Recordings compilation. off the 1995 demo. Damien Moyal, the former vocalist of the band, still has a "Sauve Qui Peut" tattoo on his arm.

The techno/industrial version of "If Born From This Soil", entitled "If Born From This Soil: Treatments for the Infected Foetus", was arranged by Jonathan Wright and his project, Minor Procedure.

In the thanks list, the hardcore band Will Haven is thanked twice.

The album was released in CD/LP and 12" clear brown (106 press). It is now sold through Crisis subsidiary, Revelation Records.

== Composition and music ==
The album's blend of melody and aggression, typical in modern hardcore bands, became very influential for many successful mainstream hardcore bands and much of the hardcore-metalcore scene in the 2000s, even though guitarist Matt Fox has stated on interviews that he disliked the final product and its sound quality. John Hill of Loudwire wrote that the album "capture[s] a wide palette of emotion and feeling, stringing together intense emotion while also creating loud, abrasive hardcore tracks that captured the mood and feeling of anguish and expelling it as sound."

Lyrical themes vary from misanthropy, angst, hatred, and failed romantic love. These themes give the album an overall dark atmosphere. In further releases, the band would focus even more on hatred and misanthropy.

The lyrics of "Outside the Boundaries of a Friend" are directly inspired by an unrequited love of guitarist Matt Fox, and "Eating Bullets of Acceptance" talks about how, in the words of Dave Silber, "some vegans idealise and have a sense of superiority over others".

== Track listing ==
Credits are adapted from the album's liner notes.

Hearts Once Nourished with Hope and Compassion track listing
No.	Title	Lyrics	Music	Length
1.	"Solely Concentrating on the Negative Aspects of Life"	Fox; Gilbert	Fox; Kleisath; Silber	3:09
2.	"My Heart Bleeds the Darkest Blood"	Fox	Fox; Kleisath	2:05
3.	"Outside the Boundaries of a Friend"	Fox	Fox; Kleisath	3:33
4.	"Beliefs and Obsessions"	Fox; Gilbert	Fox; Kleisath; Silber	2:46
5.	"A Profound Hatred of Man"	Fox; Gilbert	Fox; Kleisath	3:06
6.	"Beyond Man"	Moyal	Fox; Kleisath	2:54
7.	"This Wake I Myself Have Stirred"	Moyal	Fox; Kleisath	2:47
8.	"Eating Bullets of Acceptance"	Fox; Gilbert	Fox; Kleisath; Silber	2:35
9.	"For the World" / "If Born From This Soil: Treatments for the Infected Foetus"	Moyal; Fox	Fox; Kleisath; Silber	11:56
Total length:				34:52

== Credits ==
- Chad Gilbert - vocals
- Matt Fox - guitar
- Oliver Chapoy - guitar
- Dave Silber - bass guitar
- Steve Kleisath - drums
- Damien Moyal - lyrics on tracks 6,7, and 9.
- Mitchell Howell - engineer
- Dustin Moore - cover art, photographs
- Alexis Neptune - cover art, concept
- Autumn Horne - cover art, concept
- Recorded and mixed at Morrisound Studios, Tampa, Florida
- Remastered and remixed by Zeuss at Planet-Z
