= Crush 'Em All Vol. 1 =

EP (split) by Shai Hulud and Boysetsfire
- Released: March 24, 2000
- Recorded: March 1999
- Studio: Studio 13, Deerfield Beach, Florida, United States
- Genre: Hardcore punk, thrash metal
- Label: Undecided
- Producer: Jeremy Staska; Shai Hulud; Boysetsfire

Shai Hulud chronology
A Whole New Level of Sickness (2000)	Crush 'Em All Vol. 1 (2000)	That Within Blood Ill-Tempered (2003)

Crush 'Em All Vol. 1 is a split EP by hardcore punk bands Boysetsfire and Shai Hulud. It was released on March 24, 2000, on Undecided Records, 7" purple (25 press), grey (475 press), clear red (500 press), and Detroit Fest press black (#'d out of 300). The Shai Hulud cover song "Damage, Inc." was included in A Profound Hatred of Man (reissue). Shai Hulud and Boysetsfire each cover a Metallica song. This 7" is the first record of the ongoing series of Metallica tribute records. Steve Kleisath returned to play drums for Shai Hulud on this recording.

== Track listing ==
1. "Fade to Black" (Boysetsfire)
2. "Damage, Inc." (Shai Hulud)

== Credits ==
=== Shai Hulud line-up ===
- Jared Allen - bass guitar
- Matt Fletcher - guitar
- Matt Fox - guitar
- Steve Kleisath - drums
- Geert van der Velde - voice
