= Oliver Chapoy =

- Born: Oliver Chapoy
- Origin: Pompano Beach, Florida, United States
- Genres: Experimental, Electronic, indie rock, post rock, Ambient, Techno
- Occupations: Musician, composer, record producer, mixer
- Instruments: Guitar, Bass, Vibraphone, drum programming, samples, synthesizer, modular synthesizer, keyboards, celeste, electronics, pump organ, baritone guitar
- Years active: 1995–present
- Labels: Partisan Records, Revelation, Crisis, Destined to Fail, Equal Vision, Ohev, Slide the Needle Recordings, Burnt Toast Vinyl

Oliver Chapoy is an American musician and producer who resides in Brooklyn, New York. Oliver is known for his work as a former co-writer/collaborator with Experimental Pop group Warm Ghost, the instrumental band Saxon Shore and his collaborations with the likes of Helado Negro, Sinkane (DFA Records), Mikael Jorgensen (Wilco), Leverage Models & more. Oliver is also known for his performance in the group Shai Hulud. However he has been in other acts renowned for affecting the late 1990s Florida hardcore, and metalcore scene tremendously. Oliver has also engineered records at Salad Days Studio for producer Brian McTernan, including records for Circa Survive and Bane.

Oliver is currently writing for his new solo electronic music project under the name, Certain Creatures, under which he has already remixed the likes of School of Seven Bells (Ghostly Int.), Bear In Heaven, Leverage Models and more. Oliver recently collaborated with Stuart Argabright of Ike Yard (Factory Records/Acute Records) on the A-side of a 12" to be released by Brooklyn-based label Styles Upon Styles.

In August 2009, Oliver was one of 200 guitarists chosen to perform in the American premiere of Rhys Chatham's A Crimson Grail. Two hundred electric guitarists performed the piece at the Damrosch Park Bandshell in New York City and was commissioned by the Lincoln Center.

== Bands ==
- Cowpuncher (1993-1994)
- Shai Hulud (1995–1998)
- The Rocking Horse Winner (2000–2001)
- Poulain (2002–2004)
- Saxon Shore (2004–Present)
- Aarktica Live Only (2006–2009)
- Helado Negro Live Band (2009–2010)
- Warm Ghost (2010–2012)
- Certain Creatures (2012–Present)

== Discography ==
Year Prevail	Artist	Album title	Label	Credit
1997	Shai Hulud	A Profound Hatred of Man	Revelation Records	Guitar, Background Vocals
1997	Shai Hulud	Hearts Once Nourished with Hope and Compassion	Revelation Records	Guitar, Background Vocals
1998	Shai Hulud	The Fall of Every Man	Revelation Records	Guitar, Background Vocals
2005	Bane	The Note	Equal Vision Records	Engineer, Background Vocals
2005	Saxon Shore	Luck Will Not Save Us From A Jackpot of Nothing	Burnt Toast Vinyl	Bass, Guitar, Programming, Samples, Synthesizers
2005	Scary Kids Scaring Kids	The City Sleeps In Flames	Immortal / Sony	Assistant Engineer
2005	Circa Survive	Juturna	Equal Vision Records	Assistant Engineer
2005	June	If You Speak Any Faster	Victory Records	Engineer
2005	Shai Hulud	A Comprehensive Retrospective	Revelation Records	Guitar
2005	Saxon Shore	The Exquisite Death of Saxon Shore	Burnt Toast Vinyl	Guitar, Programming, Samples, Synthesizers
2007	Modwheelmood	Things Will Change Remix	Buddyhead	Remix, Additional Production
2008	Caroline	Sunrise (Sunset Mix)	Temporary Residence	Remix, Additional Production
2009	Saxon Shore	It Doesn't Matter	Burnt Toast Vinyl	Baritone Guitar, Celeste, Guitar, Piano, String Arrangements, Synthesizers
2010	Rhys Chatham	A Crimson Grail	Nonsuch	Guitar
2011	Warm Ghost	Uncut Diamond	Partisan Records	Guitar, Production, Mixing, Programming, Samples, Synthesizers
2011	Warm Ghost	Narrows	Partisan Records	Guitar, Piano, Production, Programming, Samples, Synthesizers
2011	Helado Negro	Canta Lechuza	Asthmatic Kitty Records	Bass Arrangement
2011	Junip	Without You Remix	Mute Records	Remix, Additional Production
2012	Leverage Models	Sweep Remix	Hometapes	Remix, Additional Production
2012	Test House	My Ocean Remix	Dublab	Remix, Additional Production
2012	School of Seven Bells	When You Sing Remix	Ghostly International	Remix, Additional Production
2012	Bear In Heaven	Kiss Me Crazy Remix	Dead Oceans | Hometapes	Remix, Additional Production
2012	Certain Creatures	Jeu EP	Self Released	Modular Synthesizer, Production, Programming, Samples, Synthesizers, Mixing
2013	Certain Creatures	BASH005 12"	Bangers & Ash | Styles Upon Styles	Modular Synthesizer, Production, Programming, Samples, Synthesizers, Mixing
2014	Certain Creatures	BASH00X 12"	Bangers & Ash | Styles Upon Styles	Modular Synthesizer, Production, Programming, Samples, Synthesizers, Mixing
2014	Black Rain	Dark Pool	Blackest Ever Black	Co-Producer, Mixing, Engineer, Modular Synthesizer
