= Indecision (band) =

American hardcore punk band

- Origin: Bay Ridge, Brooklyn
- Genres: Hardcore punk, metalcore
- Years active: 1993–2000
- Labels: RPP (1993, 1998); Back ta Basics (1995); Positive Face (1996); Underestimated (1997); Exit (1997–1999); City Lights (1997); Crisis (1998); Revelation (1998); Household Name (1998); Denied a Custom (1998); MIA (1999); Jawk (2000); Undecided (2000–2001)
- Members: Justin Brannan: guitar Pat Flynn: drums Steven Bago: bass Artie Phillie: vocals (1997–2000); Rachel Susannah Rosen: guitar (1998–2000); Tom Sheehan: vocals (1993–1998)

Indecision was an American hardcore punk band that was started in the Bay Ridge neighborhood of Brooklyn in 1993, and officially disbanded in the summer of 2000, though they still play shows occasionally for charity.

Indecision is known for their song "Hallowed Be Thy Name". The song features the lyric "For those I love, I will sacrifice" that fans across the world have turned into a tattoo. Photographer Laura Rauch took a photograph of the tattoo on the ribs of a 19-year-old US Army Infantryman named Kyle Hockenberry who was being treated in a medevac helicopter following an explosion that cost him both of his legs and one arm. The photo was taken for a military newspaper and went on to win an award from the Society of Professional Journalists. The lyric subsequently gained popularity with members of the armed forces. Winston McCall, the lead vocalist and lyricist of Australian metalcore band Parkway Drive also has one half of the lyric tattooed down each of his forearms.

== History ==
The band members—guitarist Justin Brannan, drummer Pat Flynn, bassist Steve Bago and vocalist Tom Sheehan, met while attending Xaverian High School in the Bay Ridge section of Brooklyn. The band added second guitarist Rachel Rosen after having met her while performing live on her infamous WNYU radio show, Crucial Chaos, in 1996.

Initially, Indecision played mostly in local clubs. Over time, a lot of the venues in their neighborhood closed down, which prompted them to take a larger step and lead to the bands integration into the New York City hardcore scene. In the early days, the band would often show up to gigs all in one car, with their equipment tied to the roof with Bungee cords.

Justin Brannan recounts these early days in the liner notes to A Hard Rain's Gonna Fall:

Fort Hamilton High School Auditorium in Bay Ridge, Brooklyn, New York. The infamous "Battle of the Bands". Our first show as Indecision. Also playing was Out of Line (with Frank Collins (Rest in Peace), Louis Torres *Founding guitarist of Indecision/ Farmer, and Dennis Dever), Confusion (with Mike Price and Mike Fried) and Purge. Indecision had a different drummer, two guitarists and two bass players at the time. What the heck were we thinking? We used to tie Bago's bass cabinet to the roof of his car with fishing rope and drive to the shows like a caravan. 5 U.S. tours, 2 European tours, almost 300 shows and 5 years later - here we are. Indecision in late 1998. [...]

The band released their first recording in 1993 on a 7-inch released by R.P.P., a Belgian hardcore label. Over the next seven years, Indecision output over a dozen 7-inch singles on a number of different labels, including many limited color vinyl and special edition covers.

In 1996 they signed with Exit (a Wreck-Age Records subsidiary) and would release three albums with the label over the next three years: "Unorthodox", "Most Precious Blood" and "To Live and Die in New York City".

The band was first noticed for its live shows at The Wetlands Preserve. Indecision, being a relatively new band at the time, would often open up the Sunday matinees. After they had finished their set, the club would quickly empty out.

In 1998, To Live and Die in New York City was their first album to feature the polarizing Artie Phillie on vocals (whom the band befriended and poached from noise-crust-punk labelmates, Milhouse), but the album retained the straight-ahead style that their other releases possessed. Tom Sheehan (Most Precious Blood) was singer previous.

The album featured an eerily prophetic manipulated photo of the Manhattan skyline engulfed in flames.

The song "Purgatory" features an audio sample about the Union Carbide tragedy in Bhopal, India. In December 1984, a gas leak at a Union Carbide India Limited plant in Bhopal, India, results in tragic loss of life in what is known as the Bhopal disaster, when up to 20,000 people lost their lives.

In 1999, the band changed labels, putting out Release the Cure on M.I.A. Records (and on Overcome Records in Europe). This was their final album.

The lyrical content was notably more socio-political with songs questioning the government and health care and conspiracy theories in regard to AIDS and cancer research. It was the first album recorded with full songs with singer Artie, formerly of the band Milhouse.

In 2000, it was announced that Indecision would be taking part of the Metallica tribute series Crush 'Em All for Undecided Records. Indecision was scheduled to share a split 7-inch vinyl with Walls of Jericho and recorded a cover of the song "Frayed Ends of Sanity". The split was delayed and eventually shelved, but Undecided Records included Indecision's recording on the various artists compilation The Old, the New, the Unreleased, released in January 2005.

A follow-up to "Release the Cure" was in the works and tentatively entitled "The Curse" but the band broke up before anything was recorded. Indecision disbanded after a show in El Paso, Texas, while on tour with Kill Your Idols on 7 June 2000.

In 2023, the band announced they'd be reuniting to support the second night of the Blacklisted reunion show at the First Unitarian Church in Philadelphia alongside Unbroken, Magnitude, and Scarab.

== Touring ==
Relentless recording and touring kept the band relevant long after many of their contemporaries faded away. Inspired by bands like Black Flag, Indecision embarked on grueling nine-to-ten month road tours to cities and countries that other bands would not dare, earning them the nickname "The Working Man's Band."

Indecision was the first American band to play in Zagreb after the Croatian War of Independence ended in 1995.

Indecision also showed its appreciation for its home Brooklyn as well as New York City—which they regularly labeled "Gotham City" on merchandise --.

The former Indecision-members Justin and Rachel are now in the hardcore band Most Precious Blood on Trustkill Records.

=== Touring disasters: The "Indecision Curse" ===
The band's tour stories have become legendary. During their first European tour in 1997, after having played a show in Wels in front of a handful of people at an indoor skate park with Flatline and Racial Abuse the band was stopped at the Austrian border on their way to Zagreb. The members were strip searched and held for hours, while the van was disassembled by the customs officials. Another incident happened on the last day of a tour in Quebec in 1999, when they had all their money and merchandise seized.

== Controversy ==
Indecision was notoriously outspoken. Most of their album art and merchandise was somehow controversial. The band always claimed it was not done maliciously or hatefully, but to "stir-up a dialogue and inspire free-thought and discussion." Artwork on their apparel from the controversial Dan Henk did not help.

== Members ==
=== Current members ===
Steven Bago - bass (1993–2000, 2023)

Justin Brannan - guitar (1993–2000, 2023)

Pat Flynn - drums (1993–2000, 2023)

=== Former members ===
Artie Phillie - vocals (1997–2000)

Rachel Susannah Rosen - guitar (1998–2000)

Tom Sheehan - vocals (1993–1998)

== Discography ==
=== Albums ===
- Unorthodox (1996: Underestimated Records)
- Most Precious Blood (1998: Exit)
- A Hard Rain's Gonna Fall (1998: Released Power Productions)
- To Live and Die in New York City (1999: Jawk Records)
- Release the Cure (1999: MIA Records)

=== EPs ===
- Indecision (1995: Released Power Productions)
- Believe (1995: Too Damn Hype Records)
- Straighter Than You Crew 1995 (1995: Independent Release)
- Samaritan (1996: Positive Face Records)
- Campaign for Complete Musikal Destruction (1998: The Abolition of Work)
- To Starve and Steal in New York City

=== Split albums ===
- Youth Crew 1995 (7-inch split with Shutdown) (1995: Back Ta Basics Records)
- 7-inch split with Sons of Abraham (1997: Exit)
- 7-inch split with Indifference (1997: 12:05 Records, City Lights Records)
- Smash Tradition (7-inch split with Knuckledust) (1998: Household Name Records)
- The Fall of Every Man (10-inch split with Shai Hulud) (1998: Crisis Records)

=== Contributions to compilations ===
- Harder They Come, Harder They Fall
- East Coast Assault
- From the Ground up
- All About Friends
- Definitely Not the Majors
- New Yorks Hardest
- Losing Face
- N.Y. Catheter Crew
- Punk Rock Jukebox
