= That Within Blood Ill-Tempered =

Studio album by Shai Hulud
- Released: May 20, 2003
- Recorded: 2002
- Genre: Metalcore; hardcore punk; melodic hardcore
- Length: 38:48
- Label: Revelation; At Dawn We Wage War
- Producer: Jesse Cannon; Shai Hulud

Shai Hulud chronology
Crush 'Em All Vol. 1 (2000)	That Within Blood Ill-Tempered (2003)	A Comprehensive Retrospective: or How We Learned to Stop Worrying and Release Bad and Useless Recordings (2005)

12" Picture Disc
- Picture disc LP, released by At Dawn We Wage War / Ides of March

Professional ratings
Review scores
Source	Rating
Allmusic	2.5/5 stars
Lambgoat	7/10 stars
Punknews.org	4.5/5 stars
Sputnikmusic.com	4.5/5 stars

That Within Blood Ill-Tempered is the second studio album by hardcore punk band Shai Hulud. It was released on May 20, 2003, through Revelation Records on CD and 300 pressings on LP format. A picture disc was released through Matt Fox's At Dawn We Wage War (former Ides of March) Records on March 30, 2004, with 1100 pressings. The album title was confirmed on November 12, 2000, and the recording and mixing was finished in May 2002, but due to artwork disagreements, the record was not released until a year later. This record is the only full-length album released with Geert van der Velde on vocals.

The intro from "Two And Twenty Misfortunes" is taken from the 1975 film The Prisoner of Second Avenue.

The intro from "This Song: for the True and Passionate Lovers of Music" is taken from the 1960 film Spartacus.

The album reached position #39 on the Billboard Independent Album chart.

== Song meaning ==
- "Scornful of the Motives and Virtue of Others": is the dictionary's description of a cynic. The song deals with people's refusal to come to terms with mankind on his terms. A testament to the hatred the band feel for a mankind that "will not embrace reason and compassion and acts on their opposites instead."
- "Let Us At Last Praise the Colonizers of Dreams": An ode to the people who have inspired the band to create and help them believe that "there are people that have dreams and live for them".
- "The Consummate Dragon": A parallel drawn between man and a dragon, roughly Smaug from the book The Hobbit, by J.R.R. Tolkien. The common man is the ultimate destroyer.
- "Willing Oneself to Forget What Cannot Otherwise Be Forgiven": not being able to come to terms with a breakup and forcing oneself past that.
- "Two and Twenty Misfortunes": A collection of all of the band's and everyone else's negative personal traits put into one man, "the most miserable of men". It deals with man creating his own destiny having a defeatist's attitude. It is again a portrait of man as they see him defined by his actions.
- "Being Exemplary": The importance of raising children properly and of being an example to them.
- "Given Flight By Demons' Wings": Not wanting to be angry or hateful. "Feeling like you are made to lash out and respond with hostility while only wanting to be a gentle and kind soul."
- "Whether to Cry or Destroy": Being so angry and disappointed that one is torn in between two opposite feelings.
- "This Song: For the True and Passionate Lovers of Music": The band's response to the insincerity and lack of integrity they observe in popular/mainstream music and its industry, writing a song just for the love of music.
- "Ending the Perpetual Tragedy": Ending the vicious cycles of deaths by violence. The song deals with man's insatiable thirst for retaliation and revenge.

== Track listing ==
No.	Title	Length
1.	"Scornful of the Motives and Virtue of Others"	3:36
2.	"Let Us at Last Praise the Colonizers of Dreams"	3:06
3.	"The Consummate Dragon"	2:59
4.	"Willing Oneself to Forget What Cannot Otherwise Be Forgiven"	3:24
5.	"Two and Twenty Misfortunes"	4:11
6.	"Being Exemplary"	3:37
7.	"Given Flight by Demon's Wings"	3:02
8.	"Whether to Cry or Destroy"	3:23
9.	"This Song: For the True and Passionate Lovers of Music"	3:39
10.	"Ending the Perpetual Tragedy"	7:51

== Credits ==
- Geert van der Velde - vocals
- Matt Fox - guitar
- Matt Fletcher - bass guitar
- Tony Tintari - drums
- Steve Kleisath - drumming written by
- The Fremen Warriors - backing vocals
- Erin Farley - engineer, mixing
- Joe Padula - engineer
- Chris Warhammer Cardinal - assistant
- Droid Allen - assistant
- Eggbert Boissonberryl - assistant
- Chandler Owen - artwork
- Derek Hess - artwork (picture disc)
