= Horizon (The Rocking Horse Winner album) =

Studio album by The Rocking Horse Winner
- Released: April 30, 2002
- Recorded: 2001
- Studio: Wisner Productions, Davie, Florida; Landmark Productions & Recording Studios, Fort Lauderdale, Florida; South Point Productions, Miami, Florida
- Genre: Indie rock
- Length: 36:23
- Label: Equal Vision
- Producer: James Paul Wisner

The Rocking Horse Winner chronology
State of Feeling Concentration (2001)	Horizon (2002)

Singles from Horizon
- 1. "Miss You" Released: January 28, 2003

Horizon is the second album by American indie rock band The Rocking Horse Winner. It was released on April 30, 2002, by American record label Equal Vision Records on compact disc and digitally. American record label Friend Club Records licensed the rights to reissue the album on compact cassette on April 22, 2021. The album features the single "Miss You", for which a music video was produced with director Chris Irving and released on January 28, 2003. Horizon topped CMJ New Music Report's "Radio 200 Adds" chart as Most-Added Album on May 28, 2002, and reached No. 44 on the "CMJ Radio 200" chart on July 9, 2002.

In promotion of the release, the Rocking Horse Winner toured the United States extensively between October 2001 and March 2003, accompanied by such bands as Dashboard Confessional, Coheed and Cambria, The Format, Bayside, The Blood Brothers, The Weakerthans, Further Seems Forever, Midtown, Hopesfall, Hey Mercedes, Brandtson, Sense Field, Onelinedrawing, Fairweather, Koufax, Twothirtyeight, Seville, The Lyndsay Diaries, The Cancer Conspiracy, Fairview and The Remedy Session. The band also performed at notable festivals like Van's Warped Tour, MACROCK, South by Southwest, CMJ Music Marathon, Monster Fest, Krazy Fest and Gainesvillefest.

The album was recorded with producer James Paul Wisner and features lead vocalist Jolie Lindholm, guitarist, pianist and backing vocalist Henry Olmino, bass guitarist Jeronimo Gomez, and drummer, percussionist and pianist Matthew Crum. The line-up remained mostly intact for the album's promotional tours, with the exception of a tour with Dashboard Confessional during which drummer Steve Kleisath filled in for Crum. Lindholm's sister, Kristen Lindholm, also occasionally joined the band as a backing vocalist.

== Background ==
In September 2001, after several months of negotiations, The Rocking Horse Winner was signed with Albany, New York-based record label Equal Vision Records. In the fall of 2001, the band returned to Wisner Productions (where it had recorded its debut album State of Feeling Concentration) to record material with producer James Paul Wisner for its second full-length album. The session included eight new songs: "Orange Blossom", "Error", "Miss You", "Horizon", "Curable", "Novelty", "Playing With Lights" and "Christmas Day"; as well as two old songs re-recorded from the debut album: "When Songbirds Sing" and "Tomorrow".

The Rocking Horse Winner's second full-length album, Horizon, was released on compact disc (packaged in a digipak) and digitally by Equal Vision Records on April 30, 2002. On May 28, 2002, Horizon topped CMJ New Music Report's "Radio 200 Adds" chart as Most-Added Album. On July 9, 2002, Horizon reached No. 44 on CMJ New Music Report's "CMJ Radio 200". The band planned to make a music video for "Miss You", though it was delayed until the end of the year. To help promote the release, Equal Vision Records put together a split CD using two songs from The Rocking Horse Winner's Horizon and two songs from Coheed and Cambria's The Second Stage Turbine Blade.

On April 22, 2021, Buffalo, New York-based record label Friend Club Records re-issued the Rocking Horse Winner's second full-length album Horizon on compact cassette.

== Promotion ==
Shortly after signing with the record label, The Rocking Horse Winner performed at Equal Vision Records' Showcase at CMJ Music Marathon on October 13, 2001, alongside other label roster bands Converge, Coheed and Cambria, Liars Academy, Fairweather, The Hope Conspiracy and American Nightmare. In December 2001, The Rocking Horse Winner toured Florida with Dashboard Confessional, Further Seems Forever, Fairweather and Seville as part of the Pompano on the Go Tour. The tour spanned ten days and included a stop to play Gainesvillefest on December 15, 2001. Crum was sick during a portion of the tour so Further Seems Forever drummer Steve Kleisath filled in on drums.

Once the album was scheduled for release, the band embarked on a series of tours which kept them on the road for the next five months. The Rocking Horse Winner left Florida to tour the East Coast of the United States, on their own, for a three-week stretch that spanned from April 5–27, 2002. The tour included a stop to perform at MACROCK on April 6, 2002, in Harrisonburgh, Virginia. The Rocking Horse Winner then met up with Ohio-based emo band Brandtson for two-weeks worth of shows back up the East Coast of the United States, spanning from April 29 to May 14, 2002.

After three weeks off at home, the Rocking Horse Winner took to the road again for a lengthy two-month tour of the lower 48 States, spanning from June 7 to July 30, 2002. The band made its way up and back down the East Coast, then through the South and West Coast, back through the Midwest and down the East Coast. Select dates of the tour were shared with California-based post-hardcore band Sense Field, California-based pop punk band Fairview, Arizona-based indie rock band The Format, Washington-based post-hardcore band The Blood Brothers and Vermont-based math rock band The Cancer Conspiracy. The tour also included a stop to play at Krazy Fest 5 on June 23, 2002, in Louisville, Kentucky.

After a brief week off back home, the Rocking Horse Winner was back out on the road for another month's worth of shows across the United States, spanning from August 8 to September 6, 2002. The first leg of the tour on the East Coast was shared with Wisconsin-based emo band Hey Mercedes, Ohio-based indie rock band Koufax and Florida-based emo band The Remedy Session. From there, the band met up with Seville for shows across the Midwest and West Coast. The last leg of the tour was accompanied by Canadian indie rock band The Weakerthans for East Coast dates on their way home.

Back home, the Rocking Horse Winner spent from September–November 2002 writing new material for a planned five-song extended play (which was never completed). It was also during this time that a music video was produced for "Miss You". The music video was directed by Chris Irving and features Dashboard Confessional's then-bass guitarist Dan Bonebrake in a leading role; it was released on January 28, 2003. The Rocking Horse Winner then accompanied New York-based pop punk band Bayside and Florida-based indie rock band Twothirtyeight on a handful of South Eastern United States shows during a two-week stretch from December 3–15, 2002.

Despite some of the member's desire to remain home to write the band's third full-length album in 2003, The Rocking Horse Winner embarked on what was planned to be a two-month tour, spanning from February 2 to April 1, 2003. The first leg of the tour was shared with The Remedy Session throughout the Southern and Central United States. For the second leg of the tour, the band met up with New York-based post-hardcore band Coheed and Cambria, Massachusetts-based emo project Onelinedrawing and North Carolina-based post-hardcore band Hopesfall through more Southern, Midwest and East Coast United States shows. The final leg of the tour was to be shared with Missouri-based emo project The Lyndsay Diaries, across the Southern, West Coast, Northwest and Central United States a second time around. The tour included a stop to perform at the Equal Vision Records/Hopeless Records/Sub City Records Showcase at South by Southwest in Austin, Texas on March 15, 2003.

In mid-March 2003, with several weeks of shows still booked ahead of them, The Rocking Horse Winner inexplicably cancelled the remainder of their tour. On March 20, 2003, Equal Vision Records released an elusive statement from the band's publicist, Earshot Media, which wrote: "Due to extenuating circumstances, The Rocking Horse Winner has had to cancel the remainder of their tour. We apologize for any inconvenience and disappointment this may cause."

No news of the band surfaced for two months, until a press release was sent to Equal Vision Records and Ohev Records, publicly announcing the band's dissolution. Through another elusive statement, the band wrote: "We would like to inform you that The Rocking Horse Winner has decided to part ways. Thanks to everyone who has supported us and offered help along the way. You made it a wonderful experience for us, and we're all very grateful for that. We apologize for all the shows that we had to cancel as a result of the departure. Despite the wreckage, Henry is now pursuing a career in songwriting, Jolie is going to continue singing and plans on starting a solo project in the future, Matt is still banging on drums for his band called ROM, and Jeronimo is pursuing a career in graphic design and computer animation."

In a retrospective interview conducted in 2004, Olmino further eluded the question of the band's break-up by stating: "Well, it just wasn't happening anymore, I don't know of any other way to explain it. There was a lost of interest and I'm not sure why. We were also touring a lot, struggling to make ends meet, so we kind of got burnt out. We decided to separate once we finished the tour; however, we had a future west coast tour booked that we had to cancel unfortunately."

== Track listing ==
All music written by the Rocking Horse Winner. Credits are adapted from the album's liner notes.

No.	Title	Lyrics	Length
1.	"Orange Blossom"	Henry Olmino	3:38
2.	"Error"	Olmino; Jolie Lindholm	3:45
3.	"Miss You"	Olmino	3:34
4.	"Horizon"	Olmino	3:40
5.	"When Songbirds Sing"	Olmino	4:15
6.	"Curable"	Jeronimo Gomez; Lindholm	4:10
7.	"Tomorrow"	Olmino	3:52
8.	"Novelty"	Gomez; Lindholm	3:44
9.	"Playing With Lights"	Gomez; Lindholm	1:57
10.	"Christmas Day"	Olmino	3:49
Total length:			36:23

== Personnel ==
Credits are adapted from the album's liner notes.

The Rocking Horse Winner

- Jolie Lindholm – lead vocals
- Henry Olmino – guitar, piano, backing vocals
- Jeronimo Gomez – bass guitar
- Matthew Crum – drums, percussion, bells, handclaps, vibraphone, piano

Guest musicians

- James Paul Wisner – backing vocals, additional guitars and piano

Production

- James Paul Wisner – recording engineer, mixer and producer at Wisner Productions
- Mark Portnoy – recording engineer at Landmark Productions & Recording Studios
- Dean Dydek – assistant drum engineer at Landmark Productions & Recording Studios
- Elias Ponce – assistant mixer at South Point Productions
- Alan Douches – mastering at West West Side Music
- Rinzen – design
- Roberto Carlos Lange – band photography

== Release history ==
Release formats for Horizon
Region	Date	Label	Format	Catalog
United States	April 30, 2002	Equal Vision Records	CD	EVR070
United States	April 22, 2021	Friend Club Records	tape	FCR024
