= Hope This Finds You Well =

Compilation album by Further Seems Forever
- Released: March 21, 2006
- Recorded: 1998–2000, 2002, 2003, 2004
- Genre: Indie rock, Christian rock, emo
- Length: 69:59
- Label: Tooth & Nail
- Producer: James Paul Wisner, Further Seems Forever

Further Seems Forever chronology
Hide Nothing (2004)	Hope This Finds You Well (2006)	The Final Curtain (2007)

Professional ratings
Review scores
Source	Rating
AllMusic	4/5 stars
Cross Rhythms	10/10 stars
Indie Vision Music	10/10

Hope This Finds You Well is a compilation album by the Pompano Beach, Florida rock band Further Seems Forever, released in 2006 by Tooth & Nail Records. It was released to coincide with the band's final tour, as they had announced that they would break up following tours of the United States and Canada that Spring. The album includes tracks from all three of the band's full-length studio albums: The Moon is Down (2001), How to Start a Fire (2003), and Hide Nothing (2004). As such it includes all three of the band's lead vocalists: Chris Carrabba, Jason Gleason, and Jon Bunch. Its title is taken from a lyric in the song "Pictures of Shorelines."

The album also includes several bonus tracks. "Vengeance Factor" was the first song the band ever released, having originally appeared on the Deep Elm Records compilation An Ocean of Doubt, and was recorded with original singer Carrabba. "There, Now I've Said It" is a previously unreleased outtake from How to Start a Fire, recorded with Gleason. This version of "Say It Ain't So" was recorded with Carrabba for the compilation Rock Music: A Tribute to Weezer and was previously included as a bonus track on the vinyl LP version of The Moon is Down. Carrabba's version did not appear on the final tribute compilation, as by that time the band had re-recorded the song with Gleason. The acoustic rendition of "Light Up Ahead" was originally included as a bonus track on Best Buy versions of Hide Nothing and was recorded with Bunch. The cover of *NSYNC's "Bye Bye Bye" was recorded with Gleason and originally appeared on the compilation Punk Goes Pop. "Justice Prevails" is taken from the band's debut EP From the 27th State and was recorded with Carrabba.

== Track listing ==
No.	Title	Writer(s)	Length
1.	"The Moon is Down" (from The Moon is Down)	Josh Colbert, Chad Neptune, Steve Kleisath, Nick Dominguez, Chris Carrabba	3:12
2.	"Pride War" (from How to Start a Fire)	Colbert, Neptune, Kleisath, Derick Cordoba, Jason Gleason	3:04
3.	"Hide Nothing" (from Hide Nothing)	Colbert, Neptune, Kleisath, Cordoba, Jon Bunch	2:56
4.	"Snowbirds and Townies" (from The Moon is Down)	Colbert, Neptune, Kleisath, Dominguez, Carrabba	4:26
5.	"Light Up Ahead" (from Hide Nothing)	Colbert, Neptune, Kleisath, Cordoba, Bunch	3:08
6.	"Against My Better Judgement" (from How to Start a Fire)	Colbert, Neptune, Kleisath, Cordoba, Gleason	3:41
7.	"The Bradley" (from The Moon is Down)	Colbert, Neptune, Kleisath, Dominguez, Carrabba	3:01
8.	"New Year's Project" (from The Moon is Down)	Colbert, Neptune, Kleisath, Dominguez, Carrabba	4:01
9.	"How to Start a Fire" (from How to Start a Fire)	Colbert, Neptune, Kleisath, Cordoba, Gleason	2:51
10.	"Like Someone You Know" (from Hide Nothing)	Colbert, Neptune, Kleisath, Cordoba, Bunch	3:16
11.	"The Sound" (from How to Start a Fire)	Colbert, Neptune, Kleisath, Cordoba, Gleason	3:41
12.	"Wearing Thin" (from The Moon is Down)	Colbert, Neptune, Kleisath, Dominguez, Carrabba	2:59
13.	"Bleed" (from Hide Nothing)	Colbert, Neptune, Kleisath, Cordoba, Bunch	2:57
14.	"Pictures of Shorelines" (from The Moon is Down)	Colbert, Neptune, Kleisath, Dominguez, Carrabba	3:12
15.	"For All We Know" (from Hide Nothing)	Colbert, Neptune, Kleisath, Cordoba, Bunch	5:21
16.	"Vengeance Factor" (from An Ocean of Doubt)	Colbert, Neptune, Kleisath, Dominguez, Carrabba	2:46
17.	"There, Now I've Said It"	Colbert, Neptune, Kleisath, Cordoba, Gleason	3:05
18.	"Say It Ain't So" (originally performed by Weezer; from The Moon is Down)	Rivers Cuomo	4:03
19.	"Light Up Ahead" (acoustic; from Hide Nothing)	Colbert, Neptune, Kleisath, Cordoba, Bunch	3:23
20.	"Bye Bye Bye" (originally performed by *NSYNC; from Punk Goes Pop)	Andreas Carlsson, Michael Lundin, Carl Kristian, Marcus Schulze, Jacob Ivar Bertilson	3:25
21.	"Justice Prevails" (from From the 27th State)	Colbert, Neptune, Kleisath, Dominguez, Carrabba	4:38
Total length:			69:59

== Performers ==
- Chris Carrabba - vocals (tracks 1, 4, 7, 8, 12, 14, 16, 18, & 21)
- Jason Gleason - vocals (tracks 2, 6, 9, 11, 17, & 20)
- Jon Bunch - vocals (tracks 3, 5, 10, 13, 15, & 19)
- Josh Colbert - guitar
- Nick Dominguez - guitar (tracks 1, 4, 7, 8, 12, 14, 16, 18, 20, & 21)
- Derick Cordoba - guitar (tracks 2, 3, 5, 6, 9–11, 13, 15, 17, & 19)
- Chad Neptune - bass
- Steve Kleisath - drums
- James Wisner - keys, additional guitar

== Album information ==
- Record label: Tooth & Nail Records
- All songs written by Further Seems Forever except "Say it Ain't So" by Rivers Cuomo and "Bye Bye Bye" by Andreas Carlsson, Michael Lundin, Carl Kristian, Marcus Schulze, and Jacob Ivar Bertilson.
- Tracks 1, 4, 7, 8, 12, & 14 recorded September 28–November 1, 2000 at Wisner Productions. Drum tracks recorded at The Dungeon. Produced and engineered by James Paul Wisner. Assistant engineer: Joe at The Dungeon.
- Tracks 2, 6, 9, 11, 17, & 20 recorded, engineered, and mixed by James Paul Wisner at Wisner Productions. Produced by James Paul Wisner and Further Seems Forever. Mastered by Alan Douches at West Side Mastering.
- Tracks 3, 5, 10, 13, 15, & 19 produced, engineered, and recorded by James Paul Wisner at Wisner Productions. Drums recorded at Landmark Studios. Mixed by James Paul Wisner at The Sound Kitchen except.
- Track 21 recorded by James Wisner at Wisner Productions. Drums recorded at Cathouse Studios by Mark Loren.
