= The Rocking Horse Winner (band) =

American indie rock band

- Origin: Davie, Florida
- Genres: Indie rock
- Years active: 1999–2003
- Labels: Destined to Fail; Equal Vision; Friend Club; Ohev; Slide the Needle
- Past members: Jolie Lindholm; Henry Olmino; Jeronimo Gomez; Matthew Crum; Oliver Chapoy; Kristen Lindholm; Steve Kleisath

The Rocking Horse Winner was an American indie rock band based in Davie, Florida. The band was formed in mid-1999, by guitarist, keyboardist and backing vocalist Henry Olmino, bass guitarist Jeronimo Gomez, drummer, keyboardist and percussionist Matthew Crum, and vocalist Jolie Lindholm. At various times, the band also included guitarist Oliver Chapoy, drummer Steve Kleisath, and vocalist Kristen Lindholm. The band broke up in March 2003, though it was not announced publicly until May 2003.

Prior to forming The Rocking Horse Winner, Gomez, Olmino and Crum had together played in the melodic hardcore band As Friends Rust. Gomez had also played in the metalcore band Poison the Well, while Chapoy and Kleisath had played in the metalcore band Shai Hulud. Shortly after the band's formation, Lindholm began contributing to releases by the emo band Dashboard Confessional.

After self-releasing an extended play in 1999, The Rocking Horse Winner was signed by Florida-based record label Ohev Records in 2000. The label compiled the songs from the band's extended play with newly recorded material to create The Rocking Horse Winner's debut album, State of Feeling Concentration, released in November 2000. The Rocking Horse Winner was then picked up by New York–based record label Equal Vision Records, which released the band's sophomore album, Horizon, in April 2002.

During its span, the band toured the United States several times, accompanied by such bands as Dashboard Confessional, Coheed and Cambria, The Format, Bayside, The Blood Brothers, The Weakerthans, Further Seems Forever, Midtown, Hopesfall, Hey Mercedes, Brandtson, Sense Field, Onelinedrawing, Fairweather, Koufax, Twothirtyeight, Hot Rod Circuit, Seville, The Lyndsay Diaries, The Cancer Conspiracy, Fairview, and The Remedy Session. The Rocking Horse Winner also performed at such festivals as Van's Warped Tour, MACROCK, South by Southwest, CMJ Music Marathon, Monster Fest, Krazy Fest and Gainesvillefest.

== History ==
=== Formation (1999–2000) ===
The Rocking Horse Winner was formed in mid-1999, by guitarist, keyboardist and backing vocalist Henry Olmino, bass guitarist Jeronimo Gomez, and drummer, keyboardist and percussionist Matthew Crum. The three members had been playing in various bands together since 1994, beginning with Wayside, an emo band with vocalist Robert Rudas. After firing Rudas, the trio recruited vocalist Damien Moyal, shifted their style of music to melodic hardcore, and named the new band As Friends Rust in September 1996.

By February 1997, As Friends Rust had disbanded and Olmino, Gomez and Crum re-recruited vocalist Rudas for the emo band Red Letter Day (Moyal would later reform As Friends Rust with a new line-up). In Red Letter Day, Crum switched to playing guitar and the band recruited drummer Darryl Bonebrake (of Vacant Andys) to complete the line-up. By 1998, however, Rudas was again let go and Red Letter Day underwent a hiatus. During this time, Olmino and Bonebrake both joined pop punk band Anchorman, Gomez was recruited by metalcore band Poison the Well, and Crum started the rock band Capsella. Later in the year, Red Letter Day was restructured, resulting with Bonebrake departing and Crum returning to playing drums, guitarist Stephen Looker (formerly of As Friends Rust, Morning Again and Culture) joining as second guitarist, and Chris Carrabba (formerly of Vacant Andys and then playing in Further Seems Forever) coming in on vocals.

When Carrabba's schedule became too busy touring with Further Seems Forever in mid-1999, and Looker left to join Poison the Well, Olmino, Gomez and Crum started a second band with a new vocalist, Jolie Lindholm. Olmino had first heard Lindholm's signing while taking a break from a Red Letter Day rehearsal in 1997; he went outside and heard a member of Vacant Andys (which shared a practice space with Red Letter Day) playing a new song on his car stereo, which featured Lindholm on backing vocals.

The new band was named after The Rocking-Horse Winner, a short story by English writer D. H. Lawrence, which Olmino noticed while flipping through a book on British literature shortly before their first show. At the time, none of the members had read the story, though Crum and Lindholm eventually read it. Shortly after the band's formation, Lindholm began contributing backing vocals to Carrabba's new solo project, Dashboard Confessional.

After only being together for three or four months, the band entered Wisner Productions in the fall of 1999, to record four songs with producer James Paul Wisner. Wisner had previously recorded material by many of the members' related projects, including As Friends Rust, Red Letter Day, Anchorman, Vacant Andys, and Further Seems Forever. The four songs recorded during the session, "Atmosphere", "Raspberry Water", "Elementary", and "Until Next Time", were released on a CD-R made by the band and sold at their local shows. The song "Atmosphere" featured Lindholm's sister, Kristen Lindholm, on backing vocals; she would sporadically join the band as backing vocalist during shows. Later in 1999, the band returned to Wisner Productions to record the acoustic song "Steps in Sand". The band also participated in a four-way split released by Silverdale, Washington-based record label Destined to Fail Recordings.

=== Signing with Ohev Records (2000–2001) ===
In 2000, The Rocking Horse Winner was signed to Coral Springs, Florida–based record label Ohev Records. Lindholm had previously dated Ohev Records' owner, Gabe Ermine, in the mid-1990s. In the summer of 2000, The Rocking Horse Winner returned to Wisner Productions for a third time to record five new songs with James Paul Wisner. "From Miles Away", "When Songbirds Sing", "Tomorrow", "Sleep Well" and "Sweet Smell Before the Rain" were compiled with the five songs previously recorded in 1999, to create the band's debut full-length album, State of Feeling Concentration, released on November 5, 2000, on compact disc by Ohev Records. In 2001, Miami New Times ranked State of Feeling Concentration the "Best Local Album of the Past 12 Months."

In the fall of 2000, the band recruited Oliver Chapoy, who had previously played in Cowpuncher and Shai Hulud. Chapoy performed several instruments in the band, including guitar, vibraphone and melodica. The band was then approached by American fanzine Slide the Needle to contribute a song to an exclusive split 7-inch vinyl with the band Electro Group, which was originally to accompany the second issue of the magazine. Instead, the fanzine decided to release the split 7-inch separately from the fanzine, launching a record label imprint. The split 7-inch, which included the song "Tomorrow" from State of Feeling Concentration, was released in May 2001, packaged in black paper sleeves; it was later re-pressed in January 2002, but packaged in red paper sleeves.

The Rocking Horse Winner embarked on their first tour in the spring of 2001, playing two weeks' worth of shows up the East Coast and into the Midwest of the United States with Virginia-based rock band Fairweather; the tour also included some cross-over shows with New Jersey–based pop punk band Midtown, and Alabama-based emo band Hot Rod Circuit. The tour spanned from March 31 to April 14, 2001, and included a stop to play the MACROCK festival in Harrisonburg, Virginia. This was followed by a stop at Monster Fest in Burlington, Vermont in June 2001, and four dates in North Carolina and Florida as part of the Van's Warped Tour in July 2001.

=== Signing with Equal Vision Records (2001–2003) ===
In September 2001, after several months of discussion, The Rocking Horse Winner was signed to Albany, New York-based record label Equal Vision Records. In the fall of 2001, the band returned to Wisner Productions to record material with producer James Paul Wisner for its second full-length album. The session included eight new songs: "Orange Blossom", "Error", "Miss You", "Horizon", "Curable", "Novelty", "Playing With Lights" and "Christmas Day"; as well as two old songs re-recorded: "When Songbirds Sing" and "Tomorrow".

On October 13, 2001, The Rocking Horse Winner performed at Equal Vision Records' Showcase at CMJ Music Marathon, alongside other label roster bands Converge, Coheed and Cambria, Liars Academy, Fairweather, The Hope Conspiracy, and American Nightmare. In December 2001, The Rocking Horse Winner toured Florida with Dashboard Confessional, Further Seems Forever, Fairweather, and Seville as part of the Pompano on the Go Tour. The tour spanned ten days and included a stop to play Gainesvillefest on December 15, 2001. Crum was sick during a portion of the tour, so Further Seems Forever drummer, Steve Kleisath, filled in on drums.

The Rocking Horse Winner's sophomore full-length album, Horizon, was released on compact disc by Equal Vision Records on April 30, 2002. On May 28, 2002, Horizon topped CMJ New Music Report's "Radio 200 Adds" chart as Most-Added Album. On July 9, 2002, Horizon reached No. 44 on CMJ New Music Report's "CMJ Radio 200". The band immediately planned to make a music video for "Miss You", though it was delayed until the end of the year. To help promote the release, Equal Vision Records put together a split CD using two songs from The Rocking Horse Winner's Horizon, with two songs from Coheed and Cambria's The Second Stage Turbine Blade.

In promotion of Horizon, the band embarked on a series of tours which would keep them on the road for the next five months. The Rocking Horse Winner left Florida to tour the East Coast of the United States, on their own, for a three-week stretch that spanned from April 5–27, 2002. The tour included a stop to perform the MACROCK festival in Harrisonburgh, Virginia on April 6, 2002. The Rocking Horse Winner then met up with Ohio-based emo band Brandtson for two weeks worth of shows back up the East Coast of the United States, spanning from April 29 to May 14, 2002.

After three weeks off at home, The Rocking Horse Winner took to the road again for a lengthy two-month tour of the lower 48 States, spanning from June 7 to July 30, 2002. The band made its way up and back down the East Coast, then through the South and West Coast, back through the Midwest and down the East Coast. Select dates of the tour were shared with California-based post-hardcore band Sense Field, California-based pop punk band Fairview, Arizona–based indie rock band The Format, Washington-based post-hardcore band The Blood Brothers, and Vermont-based math rock band The Cancer Conspiracy. The tour also included a stop to play at Krazy Fest 5 in Louisville, Kentucky on June 23, 2002.

After a brief week off at home, The Rocking Horse Winner was back out on the road for another month's worth of shows across the United States, spanning from August 8 to September 6, 2002. The first leg of the tour on the East Coast was shared with Wisconsin-based emo band Hey Mercedes, Ohio-based indie rock band Koufax, and Florida-based emo band The Remedy Session. From there, the band met up with Seville for shows across the Midwest and West Coast. The last leg of the tour was accompanied by Canadian indie rock band The Weakerthans, for East Coast dates taking them south east toward home.

Back home, The Rocking Horse Winner spent from September–November 2002 writing new material for a planned five-song extended play. It was also during this time that a music video was produced for "Miss You". The music video was directed by Chris Irving, and features Dashboard Confessional's then-bass guitarist, Daniel Bonebrake, in a leading role; it was released on January 28, 2003.

The Rocking Horse Winner then accompanied New York–based pop punk band Bayside, and Florida-based indie rock band Twothirtyeight on a handful of South Eastern United States shows during a two-week stretch from December 3–15, 2002.

=== Final tour and breakup (2003) ===
In February 2003, The Rocking Horse Winner signed with the talent and booking agency Seamless Talent Agency and Faultline Promotions. That same month, Gomez announced in an interview that the band was having difficulty agreeing on their future plans; whether to continue touring full-time or take a break to focus on writing the band's third full-length album.

Despite some of the band member's desire to remain home, The Rocking Horse Winner embarked on what was planned to be a two-month tour, spanning from February 2 to April 1, 2003. The first leg of the tour was shared with The Remedy Session throughout the Southern and Central United States. For the second leg of the tour, the band met up with New York–based post-hardcore band Coheed and Cambria, Massachusetts-based emo project Onelinedrawing, and North Carolina–based post-hardcore band Hopesfall for more Southern, Midwest and East Coast United States shows. The final leg of the tour was to be shared with Missouri-based emo project The Lyndsay Diaries, for a second time going around the Southern, West Coast, Northwest and Central United States. The tour included a stop to perform at the Equal Vision Records/Hopeless Records/Sub City Records Showcase at South by Southwest in Austin, Texas on March 15, 2003.

In mid-March 2003, with several weeks of shows still booked ahead of them, The Rocking Horse Winner inexplicably cancelled the remainder of their tour. On March 20, 2003, Equal Vision Records released an elusive statement from the band's publicist, Earshot Media, which wrote: "Due to extenuating circumstances, The Rocking Horse Winner has had to cancel the remainder of their tour. We apologize for any inconvenience and disappointment this may cause."

No news of the band surfaced for two months, until a press release was sent to Equal Vision Records and Ohev Records, publicly announcing the band's dissolution. Through another elusive statement, the band wrote: "We would like to inform you that The Rocking Horse Winner has decided to part ways. Thanks to everyone who has supported us and offered help along the way. You made it a wonderful experience for us, and we're all very grateful for that. We apologize for all the shows that we had to cancel as a result of the departure. Despite the wreckage, Henry is now pursuing a career in songwriting, Jolie is going to continue singing and plans on starting a solo project in the future, Matt is still banging on drums for his band called ROM, and Jeronimo is pursuing a career in graphic design and computer animation."

In a retrospective interview conducted in 2004, Olmino further eluded the question of the band's break-up by stating: "Well, it just wasn't happening anymore, I don't know of any other way to explain it. There was a lost of interest and I'm not sure why. We were also touring a lot, struggling to make ends meet, so we kind of got burnt out. We decided to separate once we finished the tour; however, we had a future west coast tour booked that we had to cancel unfortunately."

=== Legacy ===
Following The Rocking Horse Winner's breakup, Gomez sold off his equipment and retired from the music industry to focus on graphic design and animation. Crum continued playing in such bands as the experimental/electro duo ROM (with Roberto Carlos Lange of Helado Negro), the instrumental rock trio Feathers, and re-teamed with As Friends Rust vocalist Damien Moyal in Damien Done, recording the band's first extended play, Love Thongs.

Olmino initially retired from performing live and instead teamed up with producer James Paul Wisner and his wife, Christine Wisner, in a songwriting-producing team. He later resumed playing concerts when he joined Dashboard Confessional's live band from 2006 to 2007. Lindholm continued providing backing vocals to Dashboard Confessional recordings, and in 2004, joined the band Popvert as their new lead vocalist. In 2018, Lindholm, Gomez and Kleisath formed the post-hardcore band The Darling Fire.

On April 22, 2021, Buffalo, New York–based record label Friend Club Records re-issued The Rocking Horse Winner's second full-length album, Horizon, on compact cassette.

== Members ==
Final lineup

- Jolie Lindholm – vocals, xylophone (1999–2003)
- Henry Olmino – guitar, keyboards, backing vocals (1999–2003)
- Jeronimo Gomez – bass guitar (1999–2003)
- Matthew Crum – drums, keyboards and percussion (1999–2003)

Former members and touring musicians

- Kristen Lindholm – backing vocals (sporadic, 1999–2003)
- Oliver Chapoy – guitar, vibraphone, melodica (2000–2001)
- Steve Kleisath – drums (2001)

== Discography ==
- Rocking Horse Winner (1999)
- Four-Way Split (2000)
- State of Feeling Concentration (2000)
- The Rocking Horse Winner / Electro Group (2001)
- Horizon (2002)
- The Rocking Horse Winner / Coheed and Cambria (2002)
