= The Final Curtain =

Compilation album (with DVD) by Further Seems Forever
- Released: April 3, 2007
- Recorded: 1999, 2004, June 17, 2006
- Genre: Indie rock, Christian rock, emo
- Length: 74:16
- Label: 567
- Producer: Bruce Fitzhugh, Michael Lewis

Further Seems Forever chronology
Hope This Finds You Well (2006)	The Final Curtain (2007)	Penny Black (2012)

The Final Curtain is a compilation album and DVD by the Pompano Beach, Florida rock band Further Seems Forever, released in 2007 by 567 Records (formerly Undecided Records). The album includes the band's final live performance recorded on June 17, 2006, at The Masquerade in Atlanta, Georgia, as well as several rare and previously unreleased songs. The DVD contains video of the final performance, a band interview, photo gallery, and behind the scenes footage.

The album's bonus tracks comprise both the most recent and earliest eras of the band. Tracks 12–15 are outtakes from the band's 2004 album Hide Nothing, recorded with lead singer Jon Bunch. "Pagan Poetry" is a previously unreleased cover of a song by Björk, while the acoustic tracks were originally released as bonus tracks on Best Buy versions of the album. Tracks 16–20 comprise the band's earliest recordings from 1999, when Chris Carrabba was the group's lead singer. These are the complete recording sessions for the band's debut EP From the 27th State, on which these demo versions of "The Bradley" and "New Year's Project" appeared along with "Justice Prevails." The versions of "Just Until Sundown," and "Pictures of Shorelines" included on this compilation are previously unreleased.

== Reception ==
Russ Breimeier of TheFish.com stated that while the acoustic tracks and other extra material on The Final Curtain were a nice addition, "the final concert is poorly performed and recorded, making this a disappointing conclusion to the brief-but-impressive run of Further Seems Forever [...] It might have played well in person, but simply does not translate to disc. Production values are so-so at best, with a rough sound mix and home-video quality camera work." He noted the performance of "The Moon Is Down" as "especially sloppy" and remarked that while Bunch's singing had sounded "terrific" on Hide Nothing, "the singer seems out of his league here, out of breath on 'New Year's Project', letting the audience handle most of the high parts, and missing notes throughout the set."

== Track listing ==
No.	Title	Writer(s)	Length
1.	"Hide Nothing" (live)	Josh Colbert, Chad Neptune, Steve Kleisath, Derick Cordoba, Jon Bunch	3:23
2.	"The Moon Is Down" (live)	Colbert, Neptune, Kleisath, Nick Dominguez, Chris Carrabba	3:11
3.	"The Sound" (live)	Colbert, Neptune, Kleisath, Cordoba, Jason Gleason	3:41
4.	"Like Someone You Know" (live)	Colbert, Neptune, Kleisath, Cordoba, Bunch	3:13
5.	"New Year's Project" (live)	Colbert, Neptune, Kleisath, Dominguez, Carrabba	4:04
6.	"Light Up Ahead" (live)	Colbert, Neptune, Kleisath, Cordoba, Bunch	3:22
7.	"The Bradley" (live)	Colbert, Neptune, Kleisath, Dominguez, Carrabba	3:04
8.	"Make It a Part / All Rise" (live)	Colbert, Neptune, Kleisath, Cordoba, Bunch	6:25
9.	"Bleed" (live)	Colbert, Neptune, Kleisath, Cordoba, Bunch	2:59
10.	"For All We Know" (live)	Colbert, Neptune, Kleisath, Cordoba, Bunch	2:46
11.	"Wearing Thin" (live)	Colbert, Neptune, Kleisath, Dominguez, Carrabba	4:25
12.	"Pagan Poetry" (originally performed by Björk)	Björk	5:08
13.	"Bleed" (acoustic)	Colbert, Neptune, Kleisath, Cordoba, Bunch	3:24
14.	"Light Up Ahead" (acoustic)	Colbert, Neptune, Kleisath, Cordoba, Bunch	3:05
15.	"Make It a Part / All Rise" (acoustic)	Colbert, Neptune, Kleisath, Cordoba, Bunch	4:17
16.	"Just Until Sundown" (demo)	Colbert, Neptune, Kleisath, Dominguez, Carrabba	3:12
17.	"Justice Prevails" (from From the 27th State)	Colbert, Neptune, Kleisath, Dominguez, Carrabba	4:40
18.	"New Year's Project" (demo; from From the 27th State)	Colbert, Neptune, Kleisath, Dominguez, Carrabba	4:01
19.	"Pictures of Shorelines" (demo)	Colbert, Neptune, Kleisath, Dominguez, Carrabba	2:55
20.	"The Bradley" (demo; from From the 27th State)	Colbert, Neptune, Kleisath, Dominguez, Carrabba	3:01
Total length:			74:16

== Personnel ==
- Jon Bunch - vocals (tracks 1–11, 13–15)
- Jason Gleason - vocals (track 12)
- Chris Carrabba - vocals (tracks 16–20)
- Josh Colbert - guitar
- Kelly Scott Nunn - guitar [vocal] (tracks 1–11)
- Derick Cordoba - guitar (tracks 1–15)
- Nick Dominguez - guitar (tracks 16–20)
- Chad Neptune - bass
- Steve Kleisath - drums

== Album information ==
- Record label: 567 Records
- All songs written by Further Seems Forever except "Pagan Poetry" by Björk.
- Tracks 1–11 recorded live June 17, 2006 at The Masquerade in Atlanta, Georgia. Produced by Bruce Fitzhugh and Michael Lewis. Mixed by Jeremian Scott.
- Tracks 12–15 produced, engineered, and recorded by James Paul Wisner at Wisner Productions in 2004. Drums recorded at Landmark Studios. Mixed by James Paul Wisner at The Sound Kitchen.
- Tracks 16–20 recorded in 1999 by James Wisner at Wisner Productions. Drums recorded at Cathouse Studios by Mark Loren.
