= The Rocking Horse Winner (disambiguation) =

The Rocking-Horse Winner is a short story by D. H. Lawrence. It may also refer to:

- The Rocking Horse Winner (film), a 1950 full-length film adaptation of the story
- The Rocking Horse Winner (band), an American indie rock band (1999–2003)
