= Penny Black (album) =

Studio album by Further Seems Forever
- Released: October 23, 2012
- Genre: Christian rock, alternative rock, indie rock, emo
- Length: 36:49
- Label: Rise
- Producer: Chris Carrabba, Mike Fanuele, Jonathan Michael Clark

Further Seems Forever chronology
The Final Curtain (2007)	Penny Black (2012)

Professional ratings
Review scores
Source	Rating
AllMusic	Favorable
idobi	4/5
Jesus Freak Hideout	4.5/5 stars
Melodic	3/5 stars

Penny Black is the fourth studio album by the American rock band Further Seems Forever, released in October 2012 through Rise Records. It marks the reunion of the band's original lineup—singer Chris Carrabba, guitarists Josh Colbert and Nick Dominguez, bassist Chad Neptune, and drummer Steve Kleisath—and is their first album together since 2001's The Moon Is Down. It is also the band's first album since breaking up in 2006 and reuniting in 2010.

== Background ==
Further Seems Forever formed in Pompano Beach, Florida in 1998 and originally consisted of singer Chris Carrabba, guitarists Josh Colbert and Nick Dominguez, bassist Chad Neptune, and drummer Steve Kleisath. By 2000 Carrabba had begun working on his own project, Dashboard Confessional, recording material he considered too personal for Further Seems Forever. At this time the band struggled with interpersonal squabbles and difficulties touring, as Dominguez had a young family and was reluctant to tour outside the state. Carrabba left the band that August to focus on Dashboard Confessional, which went on to mainstream success, but joined them in the studio to record their debut album The Moon Is Down (2001). Dominguez left the band soon after. The remaining members recruited guitarist Derick Cordoba and released two more studio albums with different singers: 2003's How to Start a Fire with Jason Gleason and 2004's Hide Nothing with Jon Bunch. They maintained an amicable relationship with Carrabba, and opened for Dashboard Confessional on several occasions. They played a reunion show with him in 2005, performing The Moon Is Down in its entirety, but broke up in 2006.

The band reunited in 2010, with Carrabba singing and Dominguez on guitar. They began working on a new album in 2011.

== Track listing ==
All lyrics are written by Chris Carrabba; all music is composed by Carrabba, Josh Colbert, Nick Dominguez, Steve Kleisath, and Chad Neptune

No.	Title	Length
1.	"So Cold"	3:17
2.	"Rescue Trained"	2:47
3.	"Way Down"	3:11
4.	"King's Canyon"	3:20
5.	"Staring Down the Sun"	2:51
6.	"A System of Symmetry"	2:37
7.	"Penny Black"	3:19
8.	"On the Outside"	2:47
9.	"Engines"	2:31
10.	"Rusted Machines"	3:17
11.	"Stem the Loss"	3:02
12.	"Janie"	3:50
Total length:		36:49

== Personnel ==
Band

- Chris Carrabba – lead vocals, producer, additional engineering
- Josh Colbert – guitar
- Nick Dominguez – guitar, art direction
- Chad Neptune – bass guitar
- Steve Kleisath – drums

Production

- Mike Fanuele – recording engineer; producer (all tracks except "So Cold", "A System of Symmetry", and "Janie")
- Jonathan Michael Clark – recording engineer, mix engineer, producer
- Ben Homala – additional engineering
- Ryan Alexander – additional engineering
- Kris Crummett – mastering
