= Jeronimo Gomez =

American musician and designer

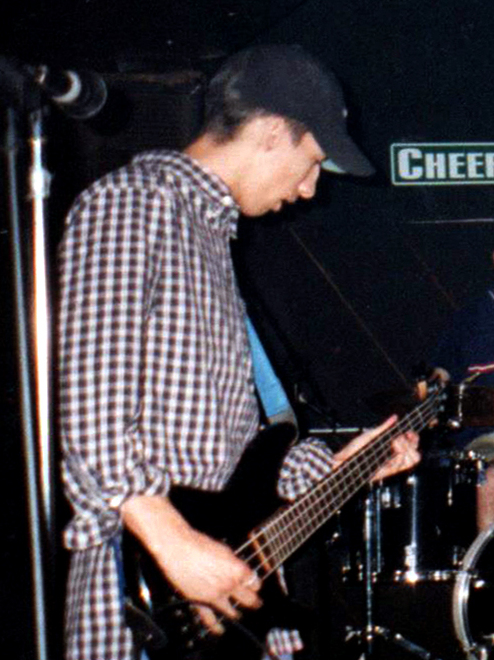
- Gomez performing with As Friends Rust at Cheers in Coconut Grove, Florida on November 11, 1996.

Background information
- Born: Jeronimo Enrique Gomez; August 19, 1976; McAllen, Texas, U.S.
- Origin: Davie, Florida, U.S.
- Genres: Melodic hardcore; indie rock; metalcore; post-hardcore
- Occupations: Bass guitarist; guitarist; musician; songwriter; designer
- Instruments: Bass guitar; guitar
- Years active: 1994–present
- Labels: Cosmic Note; D'Kolektif; Destined to Fail; Doghouse; Equal Vision; Eulogy; Friend Club; Golf; Good Life; Howling Bull; Iodine; Ohev; Shield; Slide the Needle; Spartan; Undecided
- Member of: The Darling Fire
- Formerly of: As Friends Rust; Hudson; Poison the Well; Red Letter Day; The Rocking Horse Winner; Wayside
- Spouse: Jolie Lindholm (m. 2011)

Jeronimo Enrique Gomez (born August 19, 1976) is an American guitarist, bass guitarist, musician, songwriter and designer. Originally from McAllen, Texas, Gomez grew up in Davie, Florida, where he notably played in the melodic hardcore band As Friends Rust, the metalcore band Poison the Well, and the indie rock band The Rocking Horse Winner. In 2011, Gomez married former The Rocking Horse Winner bandmate (and future The Darling Fire bandmate) Jolie Lindholm.

== Background ==
Gomez's early bands include Hudson and Wayside. As part of As Friends Rust's original line-up (from September 1996 to February 1997), he recorded on the band's first demo and the EP The Fists of Time (Good Life Recordings/Doghouse Records). The material was later reused on the compilation albums Eleven Songs (Howling Bull/Golf) and Greatest Hits? (Cosmic Note/Shield).

After As Friends Rust's first break-up (the band would reform with a different line-up), Gomez continued playing with guitarist Henry Olmino and drummer Matthew Crum in the emotional hardcore band Red Letter Day, which also included vocalist Chris Carrabba and released a self-titled EP on Eulogy Recordings in 1997.

Gomez next joined the metalcore band Poison the Well, shortly after the recording of its 1998 debut release, Distance Only Makes the Heart Grow Fonder (Good Life Recordings/Undecided Records), receiving credits as a member of the band in the liner notes, though he did not perform on the material. Gomez only remained with Poison the Well for a few months, as he was replaced by Alan Landsman.

His next band was the indie rock outfit The Rocking Horse Winner (1999 to 2003), which also included guitarist Olmino, drummer Crum, vocalist Jolie Lindholm, guitarist Oliver Chapoy and drummer Steve Kleisath. The Rocking Horse Winner toured the United States heavily during its span, and performed at such festivals as Van's Warped Tour, MACROCK, South by Southwest, CMJ Music Marathon, Monster Fest, Krazy Fest and Gainesvillefest. The band released its debut album, State of Feeling Concentration (Ohev Records) in 2001, followed by Horizon (Equal Visions Records) in 2002.

Following The Rocking Horse Winner's break-up, Gomez put his music career on hold in order to focus on graphic design and animation. In 2019, he, his wife Lindholm, and Kleisath formed the post-hardcore band The Darling Fire, which released its debut album, Dark Celebration, on Spartan Records in 2019, and its sophomore output, Distortions, on Iodine Recordings in 2022.
