= Hide Nothing =

Studio album by Further Seems Forever
- Released: August 24, 2004
- Recorded: December 2003 – April 2004
- Studio: Wisner Productions, Davie, Florida; Wisner Productions, St. Cloud, Florida; Landmark Productions & Recording Studios, Fort Lauderdale, Florida
- Genre: Christian rock, indie rock, emo
- Length: 29:54
- Label: Tooth & Nail
- Producer: James Paul Wisner

Further Seems Forever chronology
How to Start a Fire (2003)	Hide Nothing (2004)	Hope This Finds You Well (2006)

Hide Nothing is the third studio album by the Pompano Beach, Florida rock band Further Seems Forever, released in 2004 by Tooth & Nail Records. It was the band's only studio album with vocalist Jon Bunch, formerly of Sense Field, who had replaced Jason Gleason when the latter left the band due to interpersonal tensions. An animated music video was filmed for the song "Light Up Ahead."

== Background ==
Further Seems Forever recorded the music to their third album with James Paul Wisner from December 2003 to January 2004. The drums were tracked at Landmark Productions & Recording Studios in Fort Lauderdale, Florida, while the guitars and bass guitar tracks were recorded at Wisner's home studio, Wisner Productions in Davie, Florida. Vocalist Gleason got as far as recording vocals for one song, before leaving the band in mid-January 2004. Gleason cited that the band "spent too much time" together "packed in a box". Though he initially agreed to finish working on the album, he backed out, leaving the group to complete it amidst financial pressure from Tooth & Nail Records. Drummer Steve Kleisath said the manner in which Gleason "went about things was horrible and it affected a lot more people than just us, as far as the bad timing of it."

Despite an announcement that Further Seems Forever planned to break up, the band revealed that Sense Field frontman Jon Bunch had joined as their new vocalist in mid-February 2004. The band had to wait to finish recording the vocals and mix the album until Wisner could free up his schedule. In addition to relocating his studio from Davie, Florida to St. Cloud, Florida in early February 2004, Wisner was also busy recording Underoath's album They're Only Chasing Safety in February 2004, followed by Mourning September's album A Man Can Change His Stars in March 2004. Bunch finally recorded his vocals at Wisner Productions in St. Cloud, Florida in April 2004, and the album was mixed later that month.

== Composition ==
Musically, the sound of Hide Nothing has been described as emo with elements of progressive metal and pop. Kleisath said it combined elements from the group's first two albums The Moon Is Down (2001) and How to Start a Fire. He said Bunch's lyrics were "a lot less metaphorical and more up front". The opening track "Light Up Ahead" tackles the theme of spiritual salvation. The closing track "For All We Know" is an acoustic-and-piano track with a string section.

== Release and promotion ==
Further Seems Forever played their first show with Bunch in early May 2004; the band tried to have Gleason for a tour with their Tooth & Nail label-mates, until negotiations fell through. Later in the month, Bunch played some shows in Japan with Sense Field. On June 17, Hide Nothing was announced for release in two months' time. In addition, "Light Up Ahead" was posted online. "Like Someone You Know" was posted on the band's PureVolume page on July 16, 2004, followed by the title-track three days later. In early August 2004, leading up to the album's August 24 release, several more songs were made available through the band's website.

The band teamed up with Brandtson, The Kicks, Moments in Grace and Salem for the Hide Nothing Tour, which spanned from August 22 to October 4, 2004. The tour took the bands through the United States' West Coast (including a date in Western Canada), the Midwest and the East Coast. The band next partnered with Sparta, Copeland and Sunshine for another American and Canadian tour which spanned from November 5 to December 6, 2004.

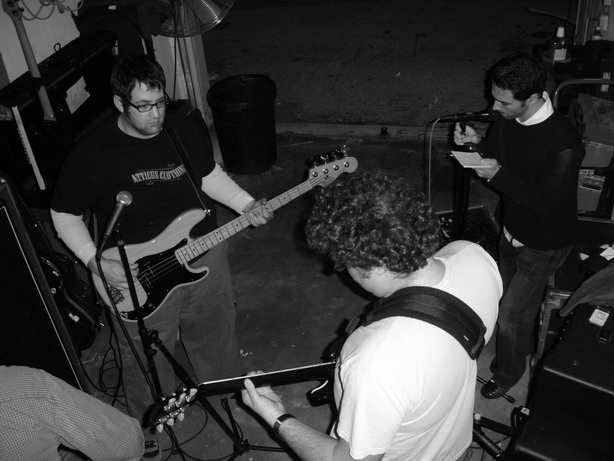
Carrabba practicing with the band for their reunion show in 2005.

From February 15 to March 14, 2005, the band toured the United States with The Starting Line, Days Away and JamisonParker. On April 5, 2005, the band released digitally the acoustic EP Hope Against Hope, which contains the bonus material original offered on the limited-edition version of Hide Nothing. On April 30, 2005, the band played a one-off reunion show with its original members, including Carrabba and Dominguez, at The Bamboozle, at which they performed The Moon Is Down in its entirety.

With Bunch back on vocals, Further Seems Forever toured Europe and the United Kingdom during May and June 2005, joined by bass guitarist Thomas Rankine (formerly of As Friends Rust and Salem). In August, the group embarked on a North American tour with Number One Gun and Project 86. In September 2005, the band headlined three shows at national amusement parks: Cliff's Amusement Park in Albuquerque, New Mexico, Walt Disney World in Lake Buena Vista, Florida and Carowinds Paladium in Charlotte, North Carolina.

On November 26, 2005, the band announced they would go on a hiatus; by early January 2006, the situation shifted to a disbandment. A planned farewell show in Canada was cancelled when Further Seems Forever became banned from the country as the result of an improperly filled out form. Five of the album's tracks – the title-track, "Light Up Ahead", "Like Someone You Know", "Bleed" and "For All We Know", as well as the acoustic version of "Light Up Ahead" – later appeared on the group's compilation album Hope This Finds You Well (2006).

== Reception and legacy ==
Professional ratings
Review scores
Source	Rating
AllMusic	Favorable
Cross Rhythms	7/10 stars
Jesus Freak Hideout	4.5/5 stars
Melodic	3.5/5 stars

Christian Broadcasting Network included the album as an honorable mention on their best albums of 2004 list. Jesus Freak Hideout ranked it at number 81 on their list of the top 100 Tooth & Nail releases.

Jesus Freak Hideout staff member Josh Taylor said Bunch's vocals were "much more melodic and ambient" than Gleason's or Carrabba's, though not as emotional as the latter, "but the power is there." Most of the time, it was a "mellow, yet sonic" release, with the tracks "pick[ing] up on occasion." Cross Rhythms writer Haydon Spenceley said the group "have struck gold" with the inclusion of Bunch: "This boy can SING." The group offered their "most immediate material to date", which could "see Further Seems Forever cementing their place at the centre of the underground rock scene."

With the album, AllMusic said the band furthered their developing brand of "appealing ... melodic emo-core", coming across as "a more finely tuned sense of songcraft" than How to Start a Fire. The resultant mixture of confessional singer-songwriter elements, aggressive guitar work and harmonies "should appeal to both the hardcore set and lovers of emo-tinged indie rock." Kaj Roth of Melodic said the record showed the band "has new fuel for their engines and feels more rocking and vital than before." He noted its short length, where "only 2 songs are longer than 3 minutes", was one of its strengths, "so you get to know all the songs much faster than the average rock album."

In 2025, Stephen Andrew Galiher of Vice included the album in his list of "4 Underrated Emo Albums From the 2000s That Deserve More Love Today".

== Track listing ==
All lyrics written by Jon Bunch; all music written by Josh Colbert, Chad Neptune, Steve Kleisath and Derick Cordoba.

1. "Light Up Ahead" – 3:08
2. "Hide Nothing" – 2:56
3. "Already Gone" – 3:52
4. "Like Someone You Know" – 3:16
5. "Make it a Part" – 2:41
6. "All Rise" – 2:49
7. "Call on the Life" – 2:52
8. "Lead the Way" – 2:32
9. "Bleed" – 2:57
10. "For All We Know" – 5:21
11. "Bleed" (acoustic)* – 3:23
12. "Light Up Ahead" (acoustic)* – 3:02
13. "Make it a Part/All Rise" (acoustic)* – 4:25

*Tracks 11–13 are Best Buy exclusive tracks.

== Performers ==
- Jon Bunch - vocals
- Josh Colbert - guitar
- Derick Cordoba - guitar
- Chad Neptune - bass
- Steve Kleisath - drums
- James Wisner - keys, additional guitar

== Album information ==
- Record label: Tooth & Nail Records
- All songs written by Further Seems Forever.
- Produced, engineered, and recorded by James Paul Wisner at Wisner Productions.
- Drums recorded at Landmark Studios.
- Vocal pre-production on tracks 1–3, 7, & 9 by Holly Louis.
- Mixed by James Paul Wisner at The Sound Kitchen except "Already Gone" mixed by Jeremy du Bois at The Dungeon Recording Studio in north Miami, Florida.
- Executive producer: Brandon Ebel.
- Layout by Jason Oda for Starvingeyes Inc.
