= Lusitania (album) =

Studio album by Fairweather
- Released: July 1, 2003
- Label: Equal Vision Records

Fairweather chronology
Alaska (2002)	Lusitania (2003)

Professional ratings
Review scores
Source	Rating
AllMusic	link
Alternative Press	3/5

Lusitania is the second studio album from punk rock band Fairweather.

== Track listing ==
1. "Derivative Opener"
2. "Lusitania"
3. "Letter Of Intent"
4. "The Treachery of Images"
5. "I Dread The Time When Your Mouth Begins To Call Me Hunter"
6. "Silent Jury"
7. "Mercer Island"
8. "Slow To Standing"
9. "1195"
10. "Concrete Atlas"
11. "Burn Bridges Keep Warm"
12. "Alaska"
13. "The Culling Song"
