= Jolie Lindholm =

American singer

- Born: Jolie Erika Lindholm; October 1, 1976; Stony Brook, New York, U.S.
- Origin: Miami, Florida, U.S.
- Genres: indie rock; post-hardcore
- Occupations: singer; songwriter
- Instrument: Vocals
- Years active: 1997–present
- Labels: B-Unique; Drive-Thru; Equal Vision; Fiddler; Iodine; Republic; Spartan; Vagrant
- Member of: The Darling Fire
- Formerly of: Dashboard Confessional; Popvert; The Rocking Horse Winner
- Spouse: Jeronimo Gomez (m. 2011)

Jolie Lindholm is a singer from Florida, best known for providing backing vocals on numerous Dashboard Confessional albums, as well as the lead vocalist in the indie rock band The Rocking Horse Winner. She later sang in Popvert. She currently serves as frontwoman for the post-hardcore band The Darling Fire and works for a south Florida real estate agency. In 2011, Lindholm married former The Rocking Horse Winner bandmate (and future The Darling Fire bandmate) Jeronimo Gomez.

== Bands ==
- The Rocking Horse Winner: Vocals (1999–2003)
- Popvert: Vocals (2005–2006)
- The Darling Fire: Vocals (2019–present)
