= The Moon Is Down (album) =

Studio album by Further Seems Forever
- Released: March 27, 2001
- Recorded: September 28–November 1, 2000
- Genres: Indie rock; emo; christian rock
- Length: 38:53
- Label: Tooth & Nail
- Producer: James Paul Wisner

Further Seems Forever chronology
From the 27th State (1999)	The Moon Is Down (2001)	How to Start a Fire (2003)

The Moon Is Down is the debut album by the Pompano Beach, Florida rock band Further Seems Forever, released in 2001 by Tooth & Nail Records. It was the band's first full-length album. Vocalist Chris Carrabba had already decided to leave the band to focus on his new project, Dashboard Confessional, but joined them in the studio to record the album. Dominguez left the band the following year to start the record label Pop Up Records. The two were replaced by Jason Gleason and Derick Cordoba, respectively, for the band's next album How to Start a Fire. A music video was filmed for the song "Snowbirds and Townies."

== Composition ==
Musically, the sound of The Moon Is Down has been described as emo and indie rock with heavier elements. The opening track "The Moon Is Down" sees the group worship God for his strength and supporting them when faltering. "Snowbirds and Townies" talks about missing a girl that has been away from some time. "Pictures of Shorelines" talks about a couple forced to stay apart.

== Release ==
The Moon Is Down was released through Tooth & Nail Records on March 27, 2001, which was promoted with a few shows alongside Thrice. In July 2001, the band appeared at Krazy Fest 4. Following this, the band toured across the US until August; they were supported by Fairweather, River City High, and the Starting Line. Between September and December, the band embarked on a cross-country US tour. They had various supporting acts during different months: The September shows were supported by As Friends Rust, Element 101 and Jameson; the October shows were supported by Ultimate Fakebook and Breaking Pangaea; the November shows were supported by the Juliana Theory, Relient K, and Ace Troubleshooter; and the December shows were supported by Dashboard Confessional, The Rocking Horse Winner, Fairweather, and Seville.

In February 2002, the band went on an east coast tour with Brand New and Recover, before touring with Hot Rod Circuit and Brand New in March and April. Following this, the band performed at Skate and Surf Fest. In July, they appeared on the midwestern dates of the Warped Tour, and in the following month, they toured across Europe. Returning to the US, the band toured until August, with Dynamite Boy, Lost City Angels, and Breaking Pangaea; the trek included an appearances at Furnace Fest and the Round Top Purple Door Music Festival.

Six of the album's tracks – the title-track, "Snowbirds and Townies", "The Bradley", "New Year's Project", "Wearing Thin" and "Pictures of Shorelines", as well as "Vengeance Factor" – later appeared on the group's compilation album Hope This Finds You Well (2006).

== Reception ==
Professional ratings
Review scores
Source	Rating
AllMusic	4/5 stars
Christianity Today	Favorable
Cross Rhythms	7/10 stars
Jesus Freak Hideout	3/5 stars
Ink 19	Mixed

AllMusic reviewer Rick Anderson said it "kind of sneaks up on you", expecting another emo act with reflective feelings but lacking the attitude to craft a song with structure, until the first chorus comes: "Cathartic, tuneful, [and] soaring". While the "conceit remains pretty much the same", he doesn't find it "tiresome". He praised the group's "ability to combine relatively dense guitar rock with an edge of experimentalism and a deep undertow of emotional uplift" that is "more than just impressive — it's practically inspiring." Cross Rhythms writer James Stafford said there was "intensity" to the band's sound, and Carrabba's voice "really bring this out." He called them a "talented" act for "drawing on elements of rock, punk, hardcore" to craft "quite a good melodic rock album." Christianity Today's Russ Breimeier said emo's " propensity for passion and emotion fits well" with Carrabba's lyricism. He complimented the band's "solid musicianship", particularly the "strong, in-your-face" guitar work and "slick, aggressive drumming that assaults your ears like a machine gun."

Jesus Freak Hideout staff member Sherwin Frias said upon his first listen to the album, it came across as "rather unremarkable", while noting its "melodic, yet hardly gripping" sound. It is ultimately "a pleasant, yet hardly engaging listen that passes by quickly without much of a fuss." Nathan T. Birk of Ink 19 wrote that it had a "time-tested formula for catharsis", noting the "sing-songy melodies", the frequent "half-time/down-tempo transitions", and Carrabba's "Geddy Lee-via-Jeremy Enigk elfin yelp that lets you know that, hey, he’s a sensitive guy." He pondering on the topic of originality: "Hardly, unless your conception of “originality” includes such latter-day emo-casualties" by the likes of Mineral and Boys Life.

Christianity Today included the album as an honorable mention on their best Christian albums of the year list. Jesus Freak Hideout ranked it at number 36 on their list of the top 100 Tooth & Nail releases. Mayday Parade covered "New Years Project" for the compilation Songs That Saved My Life Volume 2 (2019).

== Track listing ==
All songs written by Further Seems Forever except where indicated

1. "The Moon Is Down" - 3:12
2. "The Bradley" - 3:01
3. "Snowbirds and Townies" - 4:26
4. "Monachetti" - 2:42
5. "Madison Prep" - 2:54
6. "New Year's Project" - 4:14
7. "Just Until Sundown" (Further Seems Forever/Matthew Ian Fox) - 3:14
8. "Pictures of Shorelines" - 3:12
9. "Wearing Thin" - 2:59
10. "A New Desert Life"/untitled hidden track - 8:52
11. "Say It Ain't So"* (Rivers Cuomo; originally performed by Weezer) - 4:03
12. "Vengeance Factor"** - 2:46

*Included on the vinyl LP release only.
**Included on the Japanese import version of the album only.

== Personnel ==
- Chris Carrabba - vocals
- Josh Colbert - guitar
- Nick Dominguez - guitar
- Chad Neptune - bass
- Steve Kleisath - drums
- James Paul Wisner - keys

== Album information ==
- Record label: Tooth & Nail Records
- Recorded September 28-November 1, 2000 at Wisner Productions. Drum tracks recorded at The Dungeon.
- Produced and engineered by James Paul Wisner.
- Assistant engineer: Joe at The Dungeon.
- Design by Mark Owens.
- Photography by Dan Ellis.
