= Further Seems Forever =

American rock band

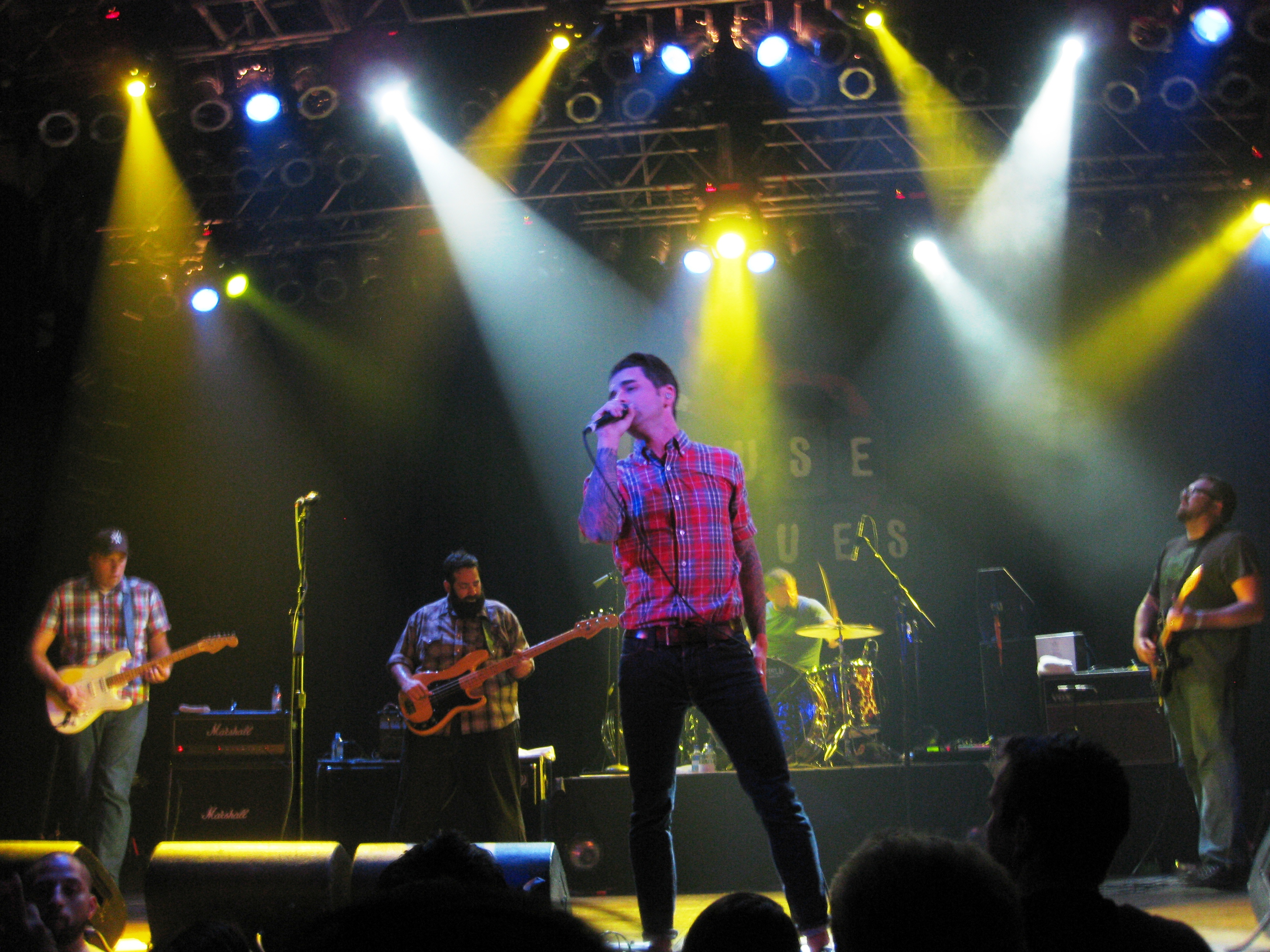
- Further Seems Forever performing in 2012. Left to right: Dominguez, Neptune, Carrabba, Kleisath, and Colbert.

Background information
- Origin: Pompano Beach, Florida, U.S.
- Genres: Emo; alternative rock; post-hardcore
- Years active: 1998–2006, 2010–present
- Labels: Tooth & Nail, Rise, Iodine, Undecided, Takehold, 567
- Members: Jason Gleason; Josh Colbert; Nick Dominguez; Steve Kleisath; Chad Neptune
- Past members: Chris Carrabba; Derick Cordoba; Jon Bunch; Jake Clark; Tom English
- Website: www.furtherseemsforever.com

Further Seems Forever is an American rock band formed in 1998 in Pompano Beach, Florida. Over its initial eight-year run the band experienced several lineup changes, resulting in a different lead vocalist performing on each of their first three studio albums. Original singer Chris Carrabba recorded The Moon Is Down (2001) with the group before leaving to focus on Dashboard Confessional. He was replaced by Jason Gleason, who performed on How to Start a Fire (2003) but left the band the following year. Former Sense Field vocalist Jon Bunch joined Further Seems Forever for Hide Nothing (2004). The band broke up in 2006 but reunited four years later with Carrabba on vocals. Their fourth studio album, Penny Black, was released in 2012.

The band's music is often classified as indie rock and is frequently associated with the emo genre. They have also been classified as a Christian rock act due to the individual band members' religious beliefs, frequent themes of Christianity in their lyrics, their association with the predominantly Christian Tooth & Nail Records label, and their performances at Christian-themed festivals such as Cornerstone and Furnace Fest. Despite these associations, the group has claimed not to be an explicitly Christian band, but rather a rock band with Christian members.

== History ==
=== 1998–2001: Formation, Chris Carrabba, and The Moon Is Down ===
The band formed in 1998 in Pompano Beach, Florida after the breakup of the Christian hardcore band Strongarm. Strongarm guitarists Josh Colbert and Nick Dominguez, bassist Chad Neptune, and drummer Steve Kleisath recruited former Vacant Andys and Red Letter Day vocalist Chris Carrabba to form Further Seems Forever. The first song the new band released was "Vengeance Factor" on the Deep Elm Records compilation An Ocean of Doubt: The Emo Diaries, Chapter Four, which contributed to the band's association with the emo genre. Their first release was a split EP with fellow Floridians Recess Theory entitled From the 27th State, released by Takehold Records, and soon the band had signed a recording contract with Seattle-based Christian label Tooth and Nail Records. By 2000, however, Carrabba had begun working on his own project Dashboard Confessional and recorded the album The Swiss Army Romance, essentially a solo release which he considered too personal for Further Seems Forever. At this time the band struggled with interpersonal squabbles and difficulties touring, as Dominguez had a young family and was reluctant to tour outside the state. This forced the group to search for several fill-in guitarists to replace him on tour. After returning from a solo tour in August 2000 Carrabba announced that he was leaving the group in order to focus on Dashboard Confessional full-time:

"I knew the only chance I had to make it in the music scene was go out there and do all the legwork to push yourself and make yourself known...I was willing to do that and they weren't. They were playing music around their jobs, not as their jobs. It was like, if we're gonna be a band, let's be a band. This isn't going to happen by itself."

Despite this decision, Carrabba joined the band the following month to record their debut album The Moon Is Down, released in 2001 by Tooth & Nail. Relations between him and the other band members remained amicable, and Further Seems Forever would later open for Dashboard Confessional on several occasions.

=== 2001–2004: Jason Gleason and How to Start a Fire ===
After Carrabba's departure the band recruited Jason Gleason of Affinity as their new vocalist. With Gleason they re-recorded their cover version of "Say It Ain't So" for the compilation Rock Music: A Tribute to Weezer with Gleason's version appearing on the CD and Carraba's version appearing as a vinyl only bonus track. They also recorded a cover of "Bye Bye Bye" for the compilation Punk Goes Pop.

In August 2001, the band played Furnace Fest, and next embarked on a tour of the United States' East Coast and Midwest with Ultimate Fakebook, As Friends Rust and Keepsake in August and September 2001. The tour was cut short, however, following the September 11, 2001 attacks in New York City. Further Seems Forever and As Friends Rust cancelled the last five dates of the tour as a result, since they were playing in the vicinity of New York, culminating in New York City itself on September 14, 2001. In December 2001, they toured around Florida with Dashboard Confessional, The Rocking Horse Winner, Fairweather and Seville as part of the Pompano on the Go Tour.

In 2003, Dominguez then left the group to pursue a record label venture, Pop Up Record. He ran the label with Derick Cordoba, who replaced him in Further Seems Forever. This lineup recorded the band's second album How to Start a Fire, released in 2003, and supported it with a national touring schedule. In February 2003, the band toured with Elliott, The Early November and Salem. In 2003, Further Seems Forever signed with Undecided Records to finance their own imprint record label Pompano Basic, with plans to release a compilation of rare and unreleased material. The release took much longer to complete and was ultimately released bundled with a live DVD as The Final Curtain in April 2007, by which time Undecided Records had changed name to 567 Records.

In early 2004, as work on a third album was beginning, the group had a falling out with Gleason which resulted in his departure. In a 2006 interview he blamed the split on "completely irrational behavior on a daily basis. Mistrust. Fights. Anger. Jealousy. A very unhealthy relationship." Gleason went on to form ActionReaction in 2005 with his wife Crissie "Bella" Verhagen and released the album Three is the Magic Number in 2006.

=== 2004–2006: Jon Bunch, Hide Nothing, and breakup ===
The band's third lineup, with singer Jon Bunch (second from left).

To replace Gleason the band recruited vocalist Jon Bunch of the recently disbanded Sense Field. With Bunch, they released the album Hide Nothing (2004) and continued to tour internationally. The band teamed up with Brandtson, The Kicks, Moments in Grace and Salem for the "Hide Nothing Tour", which spanned from August 22 to October 4, 2004. The tour took the bands through the United States' West Coast (including a date in Western Canada), the Midwest and the East Coast. The band next partnered with Sparta, Copeland and Sunshine for another American and Canadian tour which spanned from November 5 to December 6, 2004.

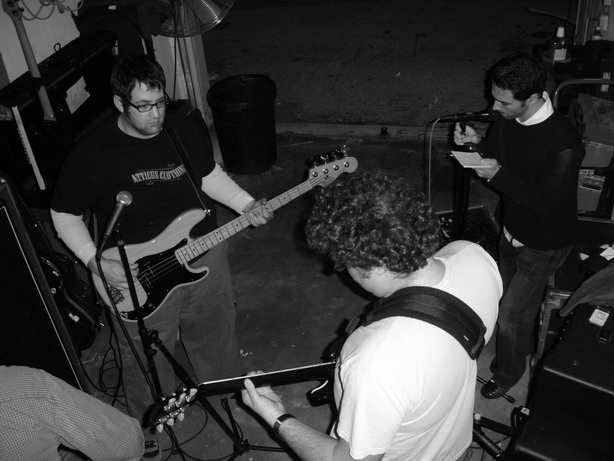
Carrabba practicing with the band for their reunion show in 2005.

From February 15 to March 14, 2005, the band toured the United States with The Starting Line, Days Away and JamisonParker. On April 5, 2005, the band released the acoustic EP Hope Against Hope. On April 30, 2005, the band played a reunion show with the original members, including Carrabba and Dominguez, at The Bamboozle, at which they performed The Moon Is Down in its entirety. With Bunch back on vocals, Further Seems Forever toured Europe during May and June 2005, joined by bass guitarist Thomas Rankine (formerly of As Friends Rust and Salem).

In November 2005, they announced a hiatus, which was followed by an announcement in January 2006 that their upcoming tour of the United States and Canada with Bunch would be their final performances, as the members' families and other commitments had eclipsed their interests in the band. As Neptune stated:

"As I sit here reflecting back on my time with FSF, saying to myself 'what happens when your dreams have come true already?' Well my answer is 'it probably wasn't my dream all along.' Sure maybe it was part of my calling but the truth is that making a family has been the goal ever since I can remember. My family is what I live for now and I am very glad to do so."

Tooth & Nail released a "best of" retrospective album that April entitled Hope This Finds You Well, and the band's farewell performance occurred June 17, 2006 at The Masquerade in Atlanta, Georgia. This performance was recorded and released as a live album and DVD by 567 Records in April 2007, entitled The Final Curtain.

=== 2007–2010: Post-breakup activity ===
Following the band's breakup, Bunch and Cordoba formed Fields Forever, a duo project performing acoustic renditions of Further Seems Forever and Sense Field songs which toured across Europe. Other members went on to other projects, with Kleisath joined a group called En Masse in early 2006 and Cordoba joining Kicked Out Heel Drag in early 2007.

=== 2010–present: Reunion with Carrabba ===
Further Seems Forever reunited with original singer Chris Carrabba in August 2010. Further Seems Forever and Dashboard Confessional both played the Groezrock festival in April 2011. The band's fourth studio album, Penny Black, was released in October 2012 through Rise Records.

In August 2015, it was announced that Gleason had rejoined the band.

Former frontman Jon Bunch died on January 31, 2016, in Irvine, California at the age of 45.

In the fall of 2021, the band played the Furnace Festival with the Gleason-era lineup.

On February 2, 2022, it was announced that Further Seems Forever would reunite with the original lineup to celebrate 20 years of The Moon Is Down at Breakfest in Franklin, Tennessee.

In February 2024, the band signed with Iodine Recordings.

== Personnel ==
Current members

- Jason Gleason – lead vocals (2002–2004, 2016–2017, 2021–present), backing vocals (2016–2017)
- Josh Colbert – lead guitar (1998–2006, 2010–present)
- Nick Dominguez – rhythm guitar (1998–2002, 2010–present), lead guitar (2000–2002)
- Chad Neptune – bass guitar (1998–2004, 2010–present)
- Steve Kleisath – drums (1998–2006, 2010–present)

Former members

- Chris Carrabba – lead vocals, keyboards, piano (1998–2002, 2010–2021), backing vocals (2016–2017)
- Derick Cordoba – rhythm guitar, lead guitar (2002–2006)
- Jon Bunch – lead vocals (2004–2006; died 2016)

Former touring members

- Ian Sirianni – guitars (touring) (2001–2002)
- Brandon Swanson – guitars (touring) (2002–2004)
- Ian Fowles – guitars (touring) (2005–2006)

Timeline

== Discography ==
Further Seems Forever discography
- Studio albums: 4
- EPs: 1
- Live albums: 1
- Compilation albums: 1
- Singles: 1
- Music videos: 4
- Other appearances: 3

The discography of Further Seems Forever consists of four studio albums, one live album, one compilation album, one EP, one single, and four music videos.

=== Studio albums ===
Year	Album details	Peak chart positions		
Year	Album details	US		
Year	Album details	Billboard 200	Christian	Heatseekers
2001	The Moon Is Down: Released: March 27, 2001; Label: Tooth & Nail Records; Format: CD, LP	—	—	—
2003	How to Start a Fire: Released: February 11, 2003; Label: Tooth & Nail Records; Format: CD, LP	133	6	1
2004	Hide Nothing: Released: August 24, 2004; Label: Tooth & Nail Records; Format: CD, LP	122	4	3
2012	Penny Black: Released: October 23, 2012; Label: Rise Records; Format: CD	62	3	—
"—" denotes releases that did not chart.

=== Live albums ===
Year	Album details
2007	The Final Curtain: Released: January 9, 2007; Label: 567; Format: CD / DVD

=== Compilation albums ===
Year	Album details
2006	Hope This Finds You Well: Released: March 21, 2006; Label: Tooth & Nail; Format: CD

=== Extended plays ===
Year	Release details
1999	From the 27th State: Released: July 4, 1999; Label: Takehold; Format: CD

=== Singles ===
Year	Single details
2002	Further Seems Forever / Twothirtyeight: Released: December 17, 2002; Label: Tooth & Nail; Format: 7"
2010	Acoustic 7": Released: December 21, 2010; Label: Self-Released; Format: 7"
2012	So Cold: Released: October 23, 2012; Label: Rise Records; Format: 7"

=== Music videos ===
Year	Song	Director	Album
2001	"Snowbirds and Townies"		The Moon Is Down
2003	"The Sound"		How to Start a Fire
2004	"Light Up Ahead"		Hide Nothing
2012	"So Cold"	Caleb Mallery	Penny Black

=== Other appearances ===
The following Further Seems Forever songs were released on compilation albums. This is not an exhaustive list; songs that were first released on the band's albums, EPs, and singles are not included.

Year	Release details	Track
1999	An Ocean of Doubt: Released: September 28, 1999; Label: Deep Elm; Format: CD	"Vengeance Factor"
2002	Rock Music: A Tribute to Weezer: Released: January 22, 2002; Label: Dead Droid; Format: CD	"Say It Ain't So" (originally performed by Weezer)
2002	Punk Goes Pop: Released: April 2, 2002; Label: Fearless; Format: CD	"Bye Bye Bye" (originally performed by *NSYNC)
