= How to Start a Fire =

Studio album by Further Seems Forever
- Released: February 11, 2003
- Recorded: Mid-to-late 2002
- Studio: Wisner Productions
- Genres: Emo, indie rock
- Length: 36:50
- Label: Tooth & Nail
- Producers: James Paul Wisner, Further Seems Forever

Further Seems Forever chronology
The Moon Is Down (2001)	How to Start a Fire (2003)	Hide Nothing (2004)

How to Start a Fire is the second album by the Pompano Beach, Florida rock band Further Seems Forever, released in 2003 by Tooth & Nail Records. It was the band's only album with vocalist Jason Gleason, who had replaced original singer Chris Carrabba when the latter left the band to focus on his new project Dashboard Confessional. Gleason would leave the band the following year due to interpersonal tensions and be replaced by former Sense Field singer Jon Bunch. How to Start a Fire was also the band's first album with guitarist Derick Cordoba, replacing original guitarist Nick Dominguez.

== Background and production ==
Frontman Chris Carrabba left Further Seems Forever as his side project Dashboard Confessional was becoming popular. He returned briefly to record the group's debut album The Moon Is Down (2001), but left before its eventual release. Following this, the group enlisted former Affinity vocalist Jason Gleason as their frontman. His earliest recorded performances appeared on the Rock Music: A Tribute to Weezer (2001) and Punk Goes Pop (2001) compilations. Guitarist Nick Dominguez was replaced by Derick Cordoba.

Recording for How to Start a Fire started in June 2002, with sessions taking place at Wisner Productions. James Paul Wisner and Further Seems Forever served as producers; Wisner handled recording, engineering and mixing. Halfway through recording, the band toured as part of the Warped Tour in mid-2002, and later embarked on an east coast and midwestern US tour with Breaking Pangaea. After returning home, they spent another month recording. Alan Douches mastered the tracks at West West Side Mastering.

== Composition ==
Musically, the sound of How to Start a Fire has been described as emo and indie rock, drawing comparisons to the Juliana Theory, Taking Back Sunday, Jimmy Eat World and early Manic Street Preachers. The band operated in two modes for the album: louder tracks with angular guitar lines and harsh rhythm parts with catchy chorus sections, as displayed in the title-track and "The Sound"; and the softer mode, as shown in "A Blank Page Empire" and "I Am". It introduces string and piano instrumentation into the group's sound and showcases Gleason's vocal style, which was similar to Carrabba's albeit grainer. The lyrics focused on poetic imagery to convey the tone; Gleason offered a darker perspective, in comparison to Carabba, which was mainly pessimistic with overtones of hope. Wisner provided keyboard and additional guitar parts to the recordings.

The opening track "How to Start a Fire" starts with the sound of a struck match, shifting into a hardcore punk-indebted song. "The Sound" bounces between post-hardcore verse sections and harmony-infused chorus sections in the vein of Cheap Trick. "A Blank Page Empire" is an alternative blues shuffle track about dealing with the loss of a loved one, and was compared to The Moon Is Down track "Snowbirds and Townies". "I Am" is about questioning the viability of a strained relationship. It starts off partially acoustic before building to an electric ending, in the vein of "For Evangeline" by the Juliana Theory and The Moon Is Down number "Monachett". "Pride War" tackles the theme of egotism. "On Legendary" opens with an acoustic guitar intro. "Insincerity as an Artform" features the use of guitar harmonics. "The Deep" showcased Gleason's wider vocal abilities. The closing track "Aurora Borealis (In Long Form)" incorporates a string section alongside the loud guitars. Over the course of the near-five minute song, Gleason's voice changes from singing to screaming and back again.

== Release ==
In August 2002, Further Seems Further went on a tour of Germany. In October and November 2002, the band went on tour across the US alongside New Found Glory, Something Corporate and Finch. How to Start a Fire was made available for streaming on January 14, 2003, before released through Tooth & Nail Records on February 11. In February and March, the band embarked on a headlining US tour, with support from Elliott, the Early November, the Rise, the Beautiful Mistake, Open Hand, and Twothirtyeight. The music video for "The Sound" was posted on MP4.com on March 10. Following this, they toured with the Ataris and the Juliana Theory on a two-month tour of the US. The band went on The Made Tour, which ran from June to August; they played alongside the Movielife, Autopilot Off, and Anberlin. In September, the band participated in the Take Action Tour. How to Start a Fire was released in the UK on October 13. Gleason left the band in early 2004, citing that they "spent too much time" together "packed in a box".

How to Start a Fire was pressed on vinyl in 2008 through Tooth & Nail and Broken Circles Records; it was re-pressed by Tooth & Nail and Universal Music Special Markets in 2017. Four of the album's tracks – "Pride War", "Against My Better Judgement", the title-track and "The Sound" – later appeared on the group's compilation album Hope This Finds You Well (2006). In 2016, the group went on tour playing How to Start a Fire with Gleason.

== Reception ==
Professional ratings
Review scores
Source	Rating
AllMusic	4/5 stars
Christianity Today	Favorable
Cross Rhythms	8/10 stars
Exclaim!	Favorable
Jesus Freak Hideout	3.5/5 stars
musicOMH	Favorable
Post-Bulletin	3.5/5
Punknews.org	3/5 stars
The Pitch	Unfavorable
Rolling Stone	3/5 stars

How to Start a Fire would go on to sell over 100,000 by 2013. Exclaim! ranked it at number six on their Best Punk Album of the year list. Christianity Today included the album at number 11 on their best Christian albums of the year list. Jesus Freak Hideout ranked it at number 18 on their list of the top 100 Tooth & Nail releases.

Cross Rhythms writer Tony Cummings said due to the "smouldering vocals" from Gleason, the "exceptional light-and-shade dynamics" from the group, combined with the "inventive arrangements", it stood as "every bit the equal" to The Moon Is Down. Christianity Today's Andy Argyrakis said it was "a fitting follow-up that presents the band in a tighter, more cohesive environment." AllMusic reviewer Johnny Loftus said Gleason aided the band in making "a focused and fiery sophomore effort" with "a greater understanding of formula." Jesus Freak Hideout staff member Sherwin Frias said Gleason carried "the same emotional style as his forebear", which allowed the group "to pick up right where it left off." The record "has proven itself strong enough to stand apart from its predecessor's imposing shadow." Post-Bulletin found Gleason's "more mature voice ... a much better fit for the band's music than Carrabba's whiny squeak." With the album, the group "took a risk and the result is 10 great songs" with them being "finally poised to make a name with their music, not with their past." Rolling Stone reviewer Kristin Roth said it "burns with incendiary power-pop guitar riffs and smolders with intensely emotive vocals", with Gleason incorporating "both a harder edge and a softer underbelly to the band's sound".

musicOMH contributor Vik Bansal complimented the group's "louder" mode, "although these songs definitely rock, they are never overbearingly aggressive". The group infrequently "over-elaborate with the rhythms and guitar patterns, and every now and again a little more rage would not go amiss." Stuart Green of Exclaim! said that while Gleason lacked Carrabba's lyricism, "his contribution to this disc cannot be ignored. His torment and lovelorn angst is sincere and affecting." He found the tracks "a little less complex" than those on The Moon Is Down, "although no less interesting." In a review for Punknews.org, staff member Scott Heisel asked the question "So how did the band do?" before answering himself with: "Not bad. Not amazing, not great, but not bad." He elaborated that it was "spotty" with a "feeling of deja vu tends to creep up throughout the album". Arizona Daily Wildcat writer Adam Pugh said the addition of Gleason "changed the whole concept of what the band was" negatively, as they lacked "the intensity of the first album and just sticks with mediocre lyrics and an endless barrage of cry-alongs." The Pitch's Geoff Harkness criticized the band for "rely[ing] on paint-by-numbers chord progressions" with "remedial lyrics ... that are scarred from a terminal case of hackney." He said the group "might be able to overcome the loss of its original singer, but a second record that continues Fire's trite tradition might as well be titled How to Extinguish a Career."

== Track listing ==
All songs written by Further Seems Forever.

1. "How to Start a Fire" – 2:51
2. "The Sound" – 3:41
3. "A Blank Page Empire" – 4:09
4. "Against My Better Judgement" – 3:41
5. "I Am" – 3:24
6. "Pride War" – 3:04
7. "On Legendary" – 3:40
8. "Insincerity as an Artform" – 3:44
9. "The Deep" – 3:46
10. "Aurora Borealis (In Long Form)" – 4:50

== Personnel ==
Personnel per booklet.

Further Seems Forever

- Jason Gleason – vocals
- Josh Colbert – guitar
- Derick Cordoba – guitar
- Chad Neptune – bass
- Steve Kleisath – drums

Additional musicians

- James Paul Wisner – keys, additional guitar

Production

- James Paul Wisner – producer, recording, engineer, mixing
- Further Seems Forever – producer, art direction, design
- Alan Douches – mastering
- Brandon Ebel – executive producer
- Bill Power – executive producer
- David Rankin – illustrations
- Alan Ferguson – band photography
- Kris McCaddon – design
