= Drook =

American dream pop

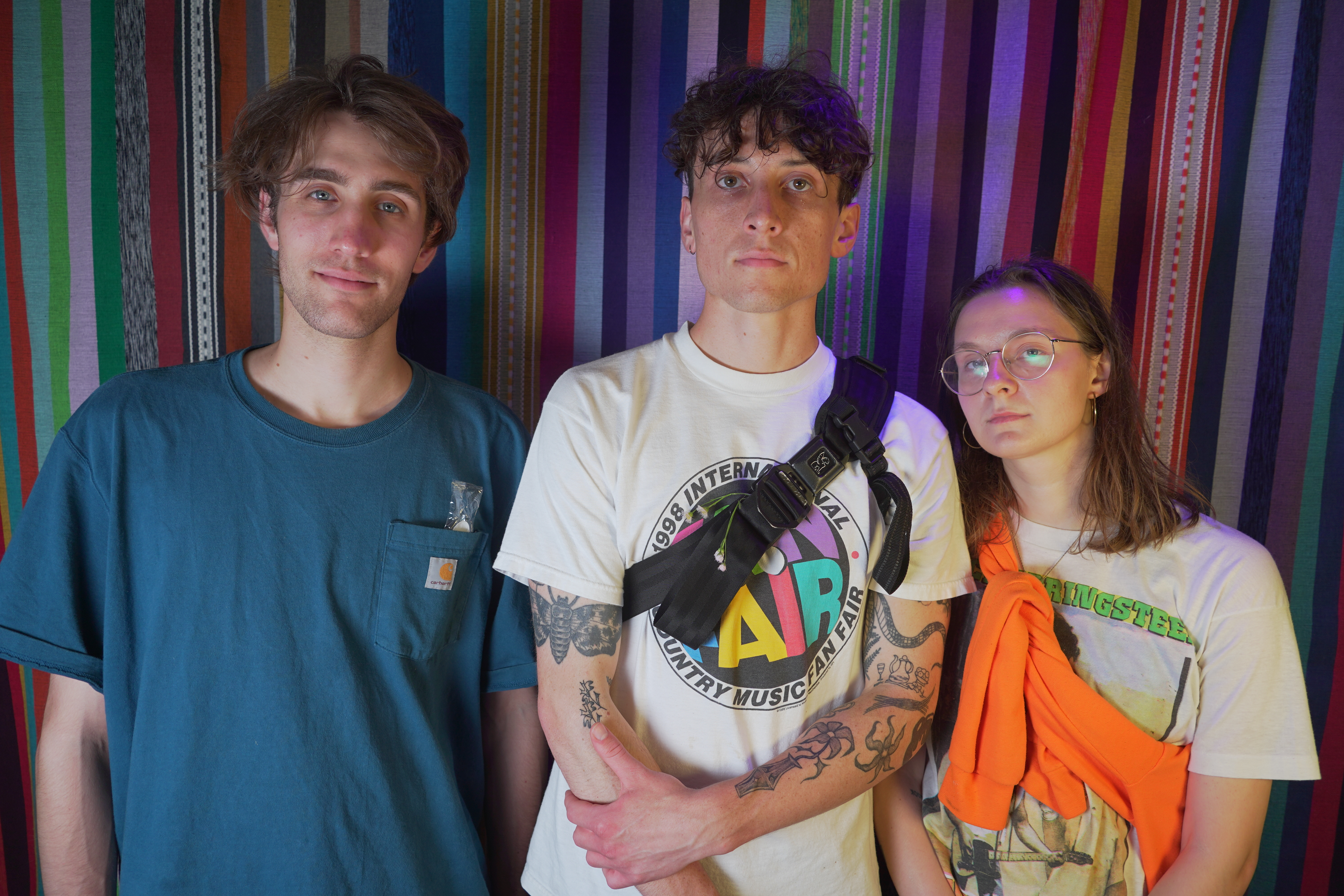
- Left to right - Tyler Smith, Matthew Shultz, Liza Grishaeva

Background information
- Origin: Richmond, Virginia
- Genres: dream pop
- Years active: 2018-present

Drook is a pop band from Richmond, Virginia. One reviewer described their live performance as "freakily locked-in and uncannily special to behold".

== Performances ==
The members of Drook established the band while students at Virginia Commonwealth University. The band's first show was in November 2018. Until 2020 the band performed with the name "She" which was their first artistic choice, but then they changed to "Drook" to gain more Internet findability. Their 2020 EP "TRL 2004" is guitar-driven, spacey, indie pop. The single "She" from that release has intense lyrics with a theme of self-destruction and seeking help.

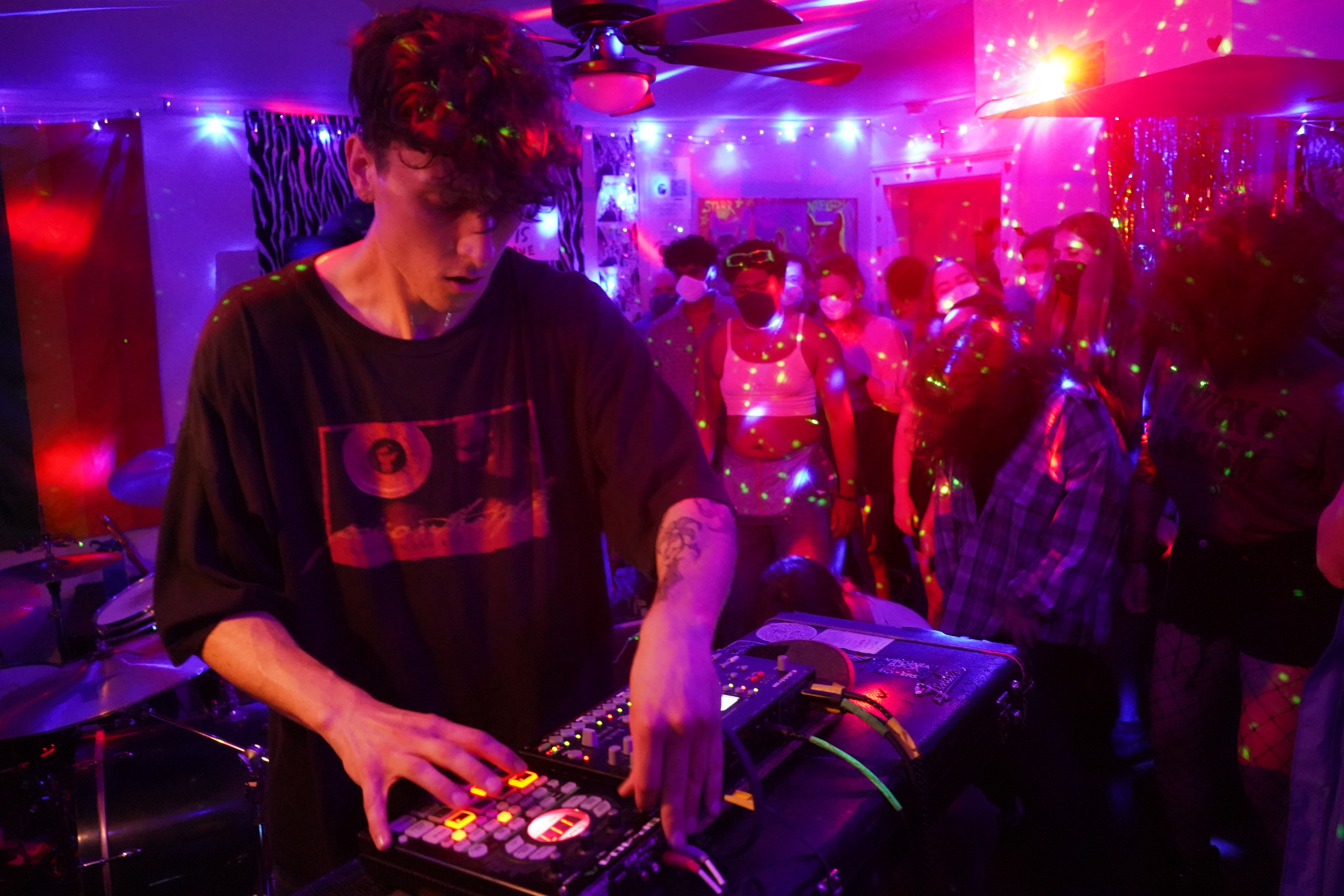
2023

Drook played at The National theater in 2020, which was an early goal of the members. Soon after the COVID-19 pandemic restricted live performances, and the band's next EP in 2022, "Life In Estates", is titled to refer to isolated life at home. That recording is dream pop with more percussion. One reviewer compared that EP's songs with bold-tasting candies and sweets. Another reviewer described Grishaeva's vocals sounded as if she were singing sweetly while the world conspired against her. The tour for that EP included a performance at South by Southwest, and convinced the members to make more music and tour more. Their next EP, Mr. Fisher’s Dirty Club Mix, is electronic music for dancing. Their 2024 album The Pure Joy of Jumping is hyperpop, manic, and energic.

== Members ==
Drook members especially like the Randolph and Jackson Ward districts in their hometown of Richmond. For fun they watch anime together, with Neon Genesis Evangelion being a favorite. They listen to music together, and like to have band practice after having breakfast together.

current

- Liza Grishaeva, vocals
- Matthew Shultz, guitarist
- Tyler Smith, drums

former

- Kalean Brown, bass

== Works ==
- TRL 2004, EP, 2020
  - "She", music video
- Life In Estates,EP, 2022
  - "Life in Estates",
- Mr. Fisher’s Dirty Club MixEP, 2023
- The Pure Joy of Jumping, 2024
  - "Sprinter", music video

== Further consideration ==
- Chloe; Cole (October 15, 2019). "Episode 20: She (Drook) by River City Sounds" (podcast). Spotify. River City Sounds.
- Crane, Jason (October 23, 2024). "In The Mix: Drook". 106.1 The Corner. WCNR.
