= Emogame =

2002 video game

- Platform: Flash
- Release: 2002
- Genre: Action
- Mode: Single-player

Emogame is a series of early 2000s browser games about emo subculture.

== Gameplay ==
In the original Emogame, the player, as a series of figureheads from emo and indie rock bands, fights through levels of enemies with "bad taste in music", i.e., out-groups of the emo subculture. For example, as Dashboard Confessional's Chris Carrabba and Bright Eyes's Conor Oberst, the player throws vinyl record projectiles at fans of Dave Matthews Band and the members of Creed on the way to rescue The Get Up Kids from Aerosmith's Steven Tyler.

== Design ==
Jason Oda created Emogame as an art student at the Rhode Island School of Design learning Macromedia Flash. The game shows both affinity and ridicule for the emo subculture. Oda would later describe the international attention he received circa 2001 as his 15 minutes of fame. Emogame developed a cult following and led to three sequels. Interest in Emogame 2.5: The Anti-Bush Game, led to game development job opportunities and a career in making browser games as viral advertising.
