= The Rocking Horse Winner (film) =

- American theatrical release poster
- Directed by: Anthony Pelissier
- Written by: Anthony Pelissier
- Based on: The Rocking-Horse Winner; 1926 story in Harper's Bazaar by D. H. Lawrence
- Produced by: John Mills; Earl St. John
- Starring: Valerie Hobson; John Howard Davies; Ronald Squire
- Cinematography: Desmond Dickinson
- Edited by: John Seabourne
- Music by: William Alwyn
- Production company: Two Cities Films
- Distributed by: General Film Distributors
- Release date: 1949
- Running time: 91 minutes
- Country: United Kingdom
- Language: English

The Rocking Horse Winner is a 1949 British fantasy film directed by Anthony Pellisier and starring Valerie Hobson, John Howard Davies and Ronald Squire. It was written by Pellisier as an adaptation of the 1926 D. H. Lawrence short story The Rocking-Horse Winner. A young boy can pick winners in horse races with life-changing accuracy.

== Plot ==
The upper middle-class Grahame family are beset by money troubles, because of the lavish tastes of Hester who spends far more than their income. Her husband responds by gambling at cards, but just loses more money. Her elder brother Oscar bails her out several times but warns that he will not do so in future. Meanwhile her son Paul strikes up a friendship with Bassett, the new handyman and a former jockey. Paul is delighted when he receives a rocking horse for Christmas and shortly afterwards a whip. Concerns about the family's finances and his mother's unhappiness and lack of luck begin to affect Paul who is convinced that the house is whispering about them. He is seen riding his rocking horse in a total frenzy, terrifying his younger sisters.

Convinced that he is lucky, Paul asks Bassett to place a small wager on a horse. Proving to be able to pick winners consistently, which he claims to discover while riding his rocking horse, he forms a secret syndicate with Bassett and his uncle which is soon thousands of pounds in profit. Meanwhile, Hester is struggling with bailiffs and forced to pawn clothes. Desperate to help his mother, Paul agrees that thousands of pounds be given to his mother without her knowing its true source. They pretend this is an inheritance from a distant relative.

Rather than making her happier, Hester becomes even more driven in her reckless spending. Then Paul's apparent gift at picking winners vanishes, and the syndicate loses most of its winnings. Convinced that everything rides on choosing the victor for the Derby, Paul frantically rides on his horse. Eventually he cries out "Malabar" before suffering a seizure. Bassett places the money on the horse, in line with Paul's instructions, and wins £70,000. Shortly after the stricken boy is told of this, he reconnects with his mother telling her that he was 'lucky' and then dies. A distraught Hester instructs Bassett to burn the rocking horse, which he does, and also the money, which he refuses to do, stating he will give it to the family solicitor to find some good to do with it, as Paul would have wanted.

== Cast ==
- Valerie Hobson as Hester Grahame
- John Howard Davies as Paul Grahame
- Ronald Squire as Oscar Cresswell
- John Mills as Bassett
- Hugh Sinclair as Richard Grahame
- Charles Goldner as Mr. Tsaldouris
- Susan Richards as the nannie
- Cyril Smith as the bailiff
- Anthony Holles as Bowler Hat
- Michael Ripper as 2nd chauffeur
- Johnnie Schofield as 1st chauffeur
- Caroline Steer as Joan Grahame
- Melanie Mackenzie as Matilda Grahame

== Production ==
It was shot at Denham Studios with sets designed by the art director Carmen Dillon.

== Reception ==
The Monthly Film Bulletin wrote: "Pelissier's version is not only cluttered with irrelevant episodes; in conception and treatment it betrays a misunderstanding of the original, a vulgar inclination towards melodrama and larger-than-life devices where the plainest, least ostentatious style would be truer to the spirit of the story, and dramatically more effective. Thus the shabby, all-but discarded rocking-horse of the story becomes shiny and new, its lips distended in an appropriately fiendish snarl; the little boy's frenzied rides are tricked out with muddled visual distortions, thunder and lightning off, and their symphonic equivalents from William Alwyn. Desmond Dickinson's highly accomplished lighting, which makes lavish use of deep focus, contributes to this general heaviness and over-emphasis of inessentials."

Kine Weekly wrote: "There is much more in the film than that which meets the eye and the brilliant acting of John Howard Davies, magnificently supported by Valerie Hobson and John Mills, gracefully underlines its tender and exciting subtleties and ironies. A beautifully balanced job, it should find favour with all but the toughest of the tough. Outstanding British booking and woman's picture."

Variety wrote: "There has rarely been a more faithful adaptation of an original than in the case of this new British production, with the exception of the ending, which was added at the particular request of the censor. Here is an example of an impressive but not lavish picture, produced and directed with obvious feeling and acted and scripted with unquestioned sincerity."

== See also ==
- List of films about horse racing
