= Jon Bunch =

American songwriter (1970–2016)

- Born: Jonathan Bunch; October 25, 1970; Harbor City, Los Angeles, California, U.S.
- Died: January 31, 2016 (aged 45) Irvine, California, U.S.
- Genres: Hardcore punk, post-hardcore, emo, alternative rock
- Occupations: Musician, singer, songwriter
- Instrument: Vocals
- Years active: 1986–2016

Jonathan Bunch (October 25, 1970 – January 31, 2016) was an American rock singer and songwriter, known for fronting the post-hardcore band Sense Field and rock band Further Seems Forever. He went on to form the post-hardcore band War Generation, and, at the time of his death, he was the lead vocalist known as "Johnny Scars" for the band Lucky Scars.

== Biography ==
Bunch was born Jonathan James Esbern Bunch in Harbor City, California, and came up in the hardcore punk rock scene in the South Bay of Los Angeles. He and Chris Evenson founded the hardcore punk band Reason to Believe (1986–1990). The band released The Next Door and When Reason Sleeps Demons Dance on the hardcore and punk label Nemesis Records.

Bunch and his Reason to Believe bandmates evolved to form the post-hardcore band Sense Field (1990–2004), an emo band. The band signed to Revelation Records and later to Warner Bros. Records. Sense Field released five albums and six EPs in the United States.

Under the Canadian independent label Nettwerk, the band saw its greatest mainstream success with the single "Save Yourself" from the 2001 album Tonight and Forever. The song also appeared on the soundtrack for the science fiction series Roswell. During that period, Sense Field also appeared on The Tonight Show and The Late Late Show. Bunch and Evenson were featured in a pictorial spread for Rolling Stone. The group disbanded in early 2004.

Later in 2004 Bunch joined the Florida-based post-hardcore band Further Seems Forever and recorded one album with them entitled Hide Nothing. He sang with that outfit until 2006. That same year, Bunch and his Further Seems Forever bandmate, Derick Cordoba, toured Europe under the banner Fields Forever, playing acoustic versions of Sense Field and Further Seems Forever songs.

In late 2012 Bunch reunited with his Sense Field bandmates for two Revelation Records 25 Year Anniversary shows on June 7, 2012, at The Glass House in Pomona, California, and on January 6, 2013, in Chicago. Bunch was fronting the post-hardcore band War Generation, which he formed with Brad Lehmann (Maylene and the Sons of Disaster). War Generation is currently signed to Rise Records. Their album, Start Somewhere, Never Surrender, was released September 3, 2013. War Generation supported the album with a U.S. tour with The Red Jumpsuit Apparatus in the fall of 2013.

Bunch died on January 31, 2016, in Irvine, California, at the age of 45. His cause of death was ruled a suicidal overdose. The autopsy revealed high levels of diphenhydramine, small amounts of alcohol and methamphetamine, and heart disease due to high blood pressure.
