= The Cancer Conspiracy =

American progressive rock band

- Origin: Burlington, Vermont
- Genres: Progressive rock Post-rock; Math rock
- Years active: 2001–2003
- Labels: Big Wheel Recreation; Radar Recordings; Gilead Media; MMD Records
- Past members: Daryl Rabidoux; Greg Beadle; Brent Frattini; Johnny Northrup
- Website: Official Myspace

The Cancer Conspiracy was a progressive rock group from Burlington, Vermont, featuring guitarist Daryl Rabidoux, drummer/keyboardist/saxophonist Greg Beadle, and bassist Brent Frattini. Rabidoux and Beadle were veterans of the local hardcore scene, and had broken away from their respective bands out of a need to try something new musically. Their initial plans were to find a vocalist and bassist, but after recruiting Frattini, decided to remain an instrumental trio.

Their style draws heavily upon 70s progressive rock, particularly King Crimson and Yes, as well as fusion, hardcore, and math rock. Their first self-titled 3 song EP was released in 2001, consisting of 2 studio tracks and 1 live track. Their 9-song full-length debut The Audio Medium followed in 2002. The album explored a number of sonic landscapes, and revolved around the concept of the corporate music industry's control of the masses; that people are sheep to what music corporations and radio stations tell them to listen to, unaware of the real music that exists out there. As in the medical world, a "cancer conspiracy" that hides the cure for cancer for the purpose of making money from the sick. The album booklet contained a letter from a doctor by the name of Dr. Travis John, who shared similar views and who warned the band of the trouble they were getting themselves into.

The band toured extensively with bandmates on their label Big Wheel Recreation, and also opened for Oysterhead's first tour. Their shows were sometimes augmented by video projections. In 2003, while at a show in New York City, their van was stolen, along with all of their equipment. This was the last and most disastrous in a series of mishaps that had plagued their tours. They decided to call it a day in late 2003. There were reports on the Big Wheel Recreation website that they were working on a second album, and songs have surfaced on P2P filesharing programs. The album is now being released by both Gilead and Radar Recordings, after years of legal issues surrounding the intellectual rights of the music. The album, Omega, was released in January 2008. Rabidoux is now working full-time as an engineer and producer at Strangeways Recording Studio in Providence, Rhode Island. He has also reunited with Frattini to form Deleted Arrows "". Beadle currently plays in a classic rock inspired band called Township in Roslindale, Massachusetts.

The Cancer Conspiracy reunited for the Rocketsled reunion show in Burlington, Vermont on January 21, 2017. The original lineup of Daryl Rabidoux, Greg Beadle, and Brent Frattini played two songs, "Broken Heartbeats Gathered and Rebroadcast" and "Summer of Andy." On April 27, 2018, it was announced that the band would perform again, this time as part of a celebration of the life of Cave In bassist Caleb Scofield. The show took place on June 13, 2018, at the Royale in Boston, Massachusetts. Other artists performing include Scofield's own bands Cave In and Old Man Gloom.
