= Seville (band) =

- Origin: Florida, USA
- Genres: Alternative rock Indie rock Folk rock
- Years active: 2001- 2003
- Website: http://www.perchrecords.com

Seville was a rock group formed in the winter of 2001, by Mike Marsh of The Agency and Dan Bonebrake of The Vacant Andys and formerly Dashboard Confessional. They disbanded in 2003, with all members pursuing other projects.

== History ==
Both The Agency and The Vacant Andys were South Florida bands active around the time that Dashboard Confessional was gaining momentum. Marsh and Bonebrake formed Seville with ex-Vacant Andy John Owens and ex-Agency Chris Drueke.

Seville quickly recorded the first 6-song e.p. "Waiting In Seville" on Fiddler Records and went on tour with Dashboard Confessional. By the end of 2001, Seville had already toured with Ben Kweller, Sense Field, Duvall, Further Seems Forever, Ultimate Fakebook, Midtown, and Rival Schools. After that tour, Marsh became a full-time member of Dashboard Confessional, while Bonebrake remained in Seville. Drueke at this time became the primary vocalist, and they recruited Kris King (Against All Authority/Machete) on drums. This line-up recorded four songs for a split release with Duvall and subsequent tour in the summer of 2002.

Midway through the tour all the members of Seville realized that the personality conflicts and the chemistry without Mike was just not enough to keep going. The band parted ways on the second night of tour with Schatzi. In the van ride home, the guys gave Chris Drueke their blessings to continue with Seville should he so desire. Chris Drueke then recorded what was intended to be a solo CD entitled "Take Me Home." Through some prodding from friends, family, and the record label, the CD was released under the name Seville in early 2003. Though Drueke released a live recording of an acoustic performance under the name Seville, the band's life was practically over.

== Current projects ==
Mike Marsh and Chris Drueke have since reunited with Klaus Ketelhohn to revive The Agency. The new CD from the Agency entitled "Turn" will be released February 6 on Perch/Eulogy. Dan Bonebrake is currently playing with Vagrant Record's John Ralston, and John Owens is playing with ex-Vacant Andy Darryl Bonebrake in Band No. 12.

== Reviews ==
- http://www.aversion.com/bands/reviews.cfm?f_id=1057
- http://www.aversion.com/bands/reviews.cfm?f_id=688
