= From the 27th State =

EP (split) by Further Seems Forever and Recess Theory
- Released: July 4, 1999
- Genre: Rock, indie rock, Christian rock, emo
- Label: Takehold Records
- Producer: James Paul Wisner

Further Seems Forever chronology
From the 27th State	The Moon is Down (2001)

Recess Theory chronology
From the 27th State (1999)	They Would Walk into the Picture (1999)

From the 27th State is an EP by the Pompano Beach, Florida rock bands Further Seems Forever and Recess Theory released on July 4, 1999 by Takehold Records. It was the debut release from both bands. Recess Theory later changed their name to the Legends of Rodeo.

== Track listing ==
1. Further Seems Forever - "The Bradley" - 3:01
2. Further Seems Forever - "Justice Prevails" - 4:38
3. Further Seems Forever - "New Year's Project" - 4:01
4. Recess Theory - "Checklist Before Chicago" - 2:46
5. Recess Theory - "Tonight, This Three Hour Drive" - 4:01
6. Recess Theory - "Oh Dateless Morn'" - 4:36

== Performers ==
Further Seems Forever

- Chris Carrabba - vocals
- Josh Colbert - guitar
- Nick Dominguez - guitar
- Chad Neptune - bass
- Steve Kleisath - drums

Recess Theory

- John Ralston
- Nathan Jezek
- Jeff Snow
- Steven Eshelman

== Album information ==
- Record label: Takehold Records
- All drum tracks recorded at Cathouse Studios by Mark Loren. All other tracks recorded at Wisner Productions by James Wisner.
