= Steve Kleisath =

American drummer

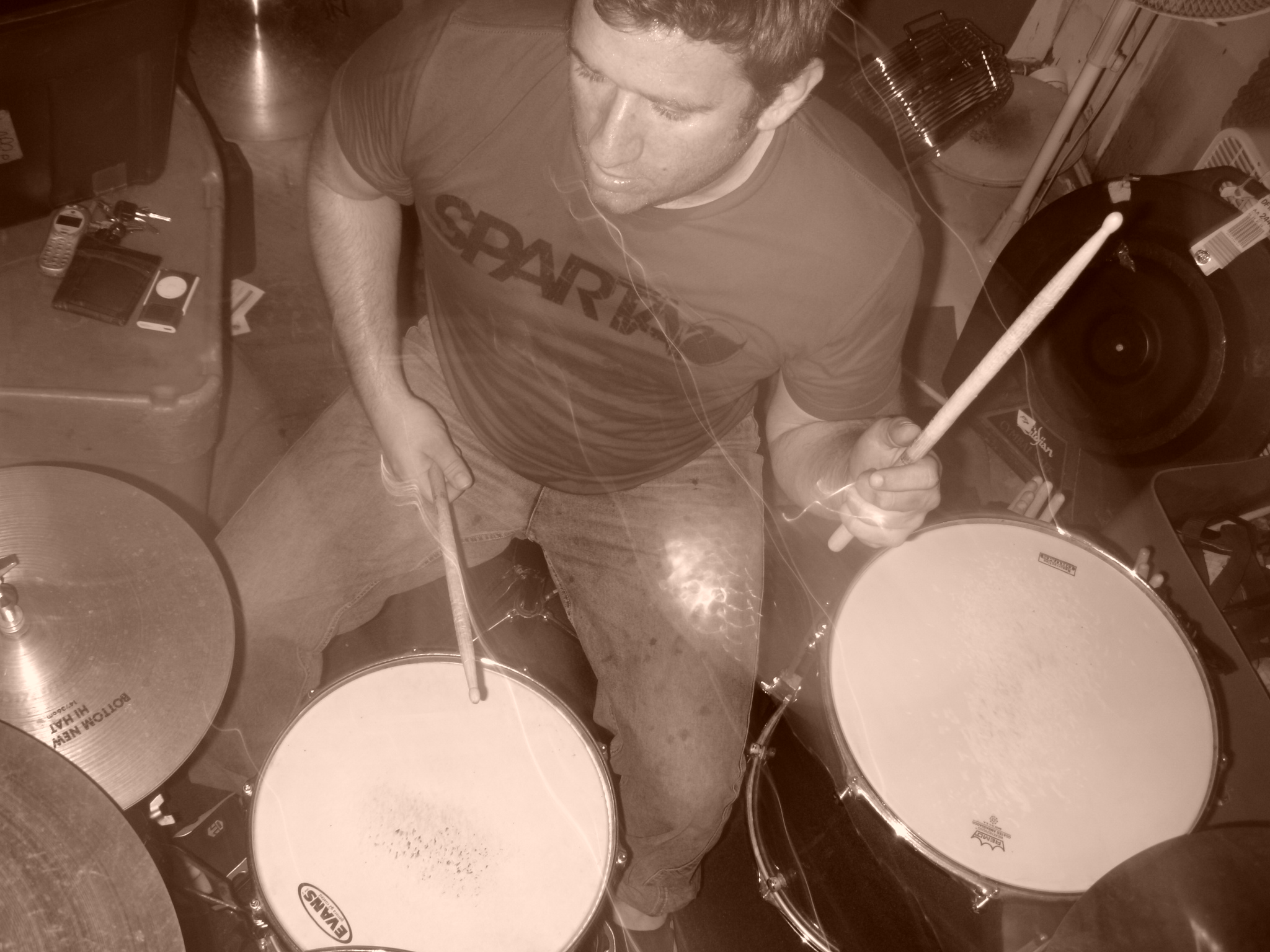

Background information
- Born: Steven Lee Kleisath; August 14; Fredericksburg, VA, United States
- Origin: Pompano Beach, Florida, United States
- Genres: Hardcore punk, avant-garde, experimental, rock
- Occupation: Musician
- Instrument: drums
- Years active: 1989–present
- Member of: The Darling Fire
- Formerly of: PULL, Strongarm, Shai Hulud, Further Seems Forever, The Rocking Horse Winner, En Masse, Friend or Foe

Steven Lee Kleisath is an American musician and has been a drummer for PULL, Strongarm, Shai Hulud, Further Seems Forever, and En Masse. The band PULL was originally called Friend or Foe. He also currently plays drums for the band The Darling Fire, who released the record Dark Celebration in 2019.

He is a semi-professional poker player. Kleisath is also the World Record holder in the classic arcade game Mario Bros. – scoring over 5 million points – and the No. 3 Ms. Pac-Man (Turbo) player in the world as ranked by Twin Galaxies.

== History ==
Steven Kleisath began his musical career in the band Friend or Foe in 1989, as the drummer. Friend or Foe changed their name to PULL and began to play with the band until 1995. In that time, the band recorded a four song demo EP, titled Regret. After PULL disbanded, Kleisath was approached by Jason Berggren of Strongarm to play drums for the band, replacing Chris Carbonell. As Kleisath and Carbonell had been friends prior, Kleisath asked for his blessing to join, which was granted. At the same time, Kleisath joined Shai Hulud, replacing Jason "Lion" Lederman (Where Fear and Weapons Meet). With Kleisath in the Strongarm lineup, the band recorded the Trials 7", which featured a re-recorded version of "Trials" and a new song, "Increase". However, after the 7" was recorded, Berggren and Bob Franquiz departed from the band, with Nick Dominguez returning on guitars and Chris Carbonell taking the mantle of vocals. The lineup, Kleisath, Dominguez, Carbonell, guitarist Josh Colbert, and bassist Chad Neptune, recorded their sophomore album, and Kleisath's debut album, The Advent of a Miracle. The album came out through Solid State Records in 1997.

Shai Hulud began recording material after The Advent of a Miracle was released. The band, consisting of guitarist Matt Fox, vocalist Chad Gilbert, guitarist Oliver Chapoy, and bassist Dave Silber, recorded an EP, titled A Profound Hatred of Man. Following the release, Shai Hulud recorded and released its debut album, Hearts Once Nourished with Hope and Compassion, which is considered a pinnacle hardcore punk album. Strongarm disbanded in 1998, as the members were burnt out at the time and wanted to work on a new project more in the post-hardcore and indie rock vein. Around this same time, Kleisath departed from Shai Hulud for personal reasons. The new project, called Further Seems Forever, began in 1998, with Kleisath, Neptune, Colbert, and Dominguez being the core of the band, with Chris Carrabba of Vacant Andys joining on vocals. Further Seems Forever would begin to work on new material, signing with Tooth & Nail Records in the process, after sending them a demo which contained four-songs. Around the time the album was finally being prepared to record, Carrabba was planning to leave the band. However, the band debuted in 1999, From the 27th State, with Carrabba on the EP. In 2000, Strongarm reunited at Furnace Fest in Alabama over August 11 through 13th, with the lineup of Kleisath and the Advent members. However, in the song "Trials", Kleisath moved aside to let Matt Fox of Shai Hulud play drums. In 2001, The Moon is a Down, was released by Further Seems Forever, with the same lineup. In December 2001, Kleisath filled in as drummer for indie rock band The Rocking Horse Winner, when their drummer Matthew Crum took sick.

In 2003, Further Seems Forever released their third album, How to Start a Fire, featuring returning members Steve Kleisath, Nick Dominguez and Chad Neptune, though original members Jason Gleason and Chris Carrabba had departed. Furthermore, Jason Gleason and Derek Cordoba stepped into vocals and guitars respectively. Meanwhile Shai Hulud released their sophomore album, That Within Blood Ill-Tempered, which saw Kleisath writing the drums for the album, though it was recorded by Tony Tintari. Gleason would depart after the album. The band would hire former Sense Field vocalist Jon Bunch.

== Bands ==
Current

- Further Seems Forever – drums (1998–2006, 2012–present)
- The Darling Fire – drums (2019–present)

Former

- Friend or Foe – drums (1989)
- PULL – drums (1989–1995)
- Strongarm – drums (1995–1998, 2000)
- Shai Hulud – drums (1995–1999)
- The Rocking Horse Winner (2001)
- EnMasse – drums (2006–2007)

== Discography ==
- PULL – Regret 7"
- Strongarm – Trials 7" (1995)
- Strongarm – The Advent of a Miracle (1997)
- Shai Hulud – A Profound Hatred of Man (1997)
- Shai Hulud – Hearts Once Nourished with Hope and Compassion (1997)
- Further Seems Forever – From the 27th State (1999)
- Further Seems Forever – The Moon is Down (2001)
- Further Seems Forever – How to Start a Fire (2003)
- Shai Hulud – That Within Blood Ill-Tempered (2003)
- Further Seems Forever – Hide Nothing (2004)
- Shai Hulud – A Comprehensive Retrospective: or How We Learned to Stop Worrying and Release Bad and Useless Recordings (2005)
- En Masse – Alarm (2006)
- Further Seems Forever – Penny Black (2012)
- The Darling Fire - Dark Celebration (2019)
