= MACROCK =

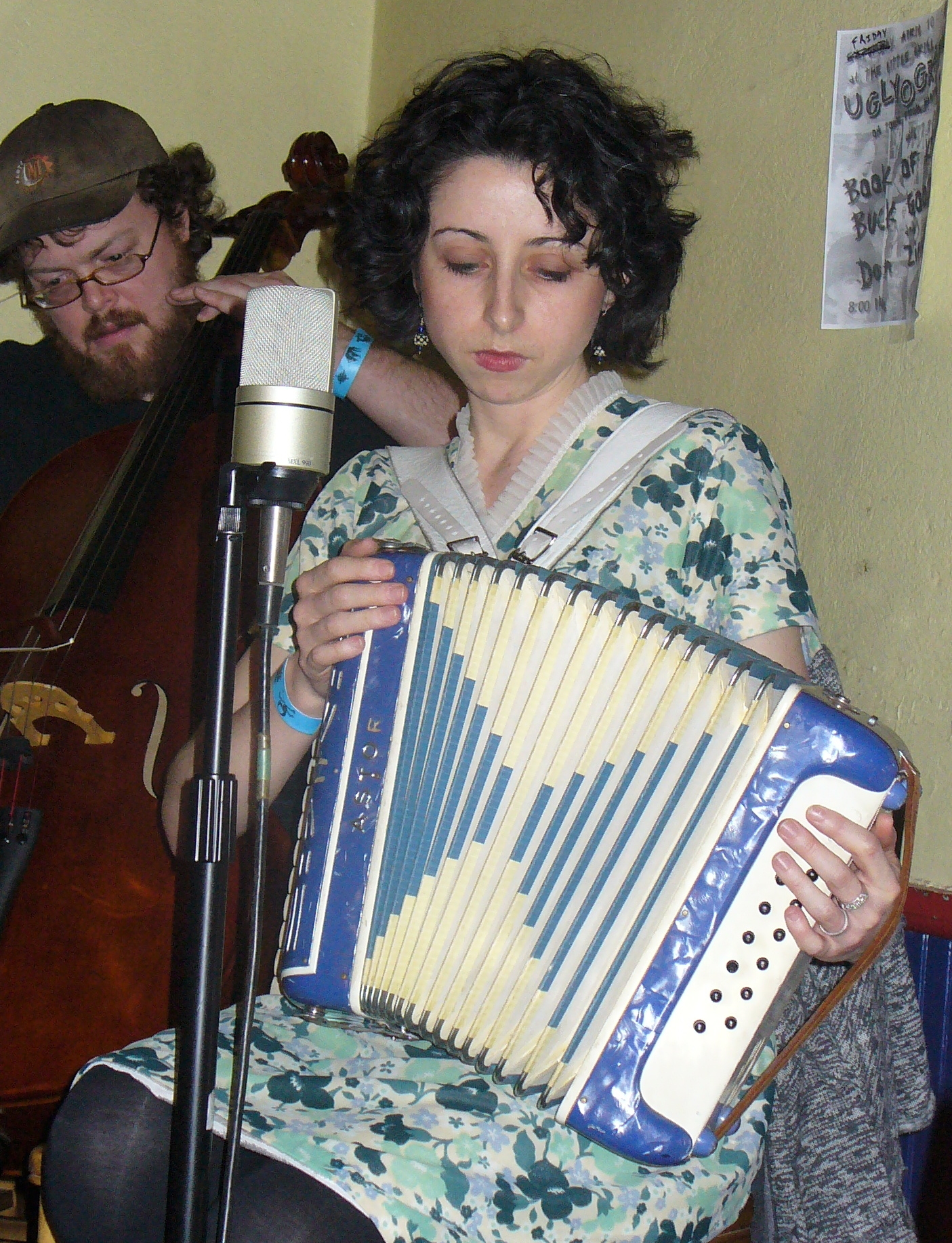
- Antonia Begonia on accordion at Little Grill Collective in Harrisonburg VA; MACRoCk 2009
- Abbreviation: MACROCK
- Formation: April 1, 1997; 29 years ago
- Type: Not-for-profit
- Purpose: give underground, indie, punk, and metal exposure and publicity
- Headquarters: Harrisonburg, Virginia, U.S.
- Region served: Virginia
- Official language: English
- head coordinator: Chelsea Goodspeed
- Main organ: committee
- Parent organization: originally organized by 88.7FM WXJM
- Affiliations: formerly James Madison University
- Volunteers: 10
- Website: macrockva.org

MACROCK, formerly known as the Mid-Atlantic College Radio Conference (or MACRoCk), is an annual music conference held in the downtown area of Harrisonburg, Virginia the first weekend of April annually since 1997. It features local, regional, national, and occasionally international musical acts as well as a music label exposition and panels addressing issues of the media, music, DIY projects, and the independent music scene.

== Purpose ==
MACROCK gives underground, indie, punk, and metal bands a chance to gain exposure and publicity by showcasing them during two days of performances around the city of Harrisonburg, Virginia. The event gives bands a much wider audience than would occur during a normal show.

== Formation ==
The festival was organized by 88.7FM WXJM, the James Madison University student-run radio station in 1997, taking up the reins from Old Dominion University in Norfolk, Virginia where the concept originated in 1993. It became independent from the university in 2006, dropping the original acronym. “The relationship between the university and the festival became adversarial and the event lost compatibility with the campus,” recalled Andy Perrine, the event's faculty advisor during its peak in the early 2000s.

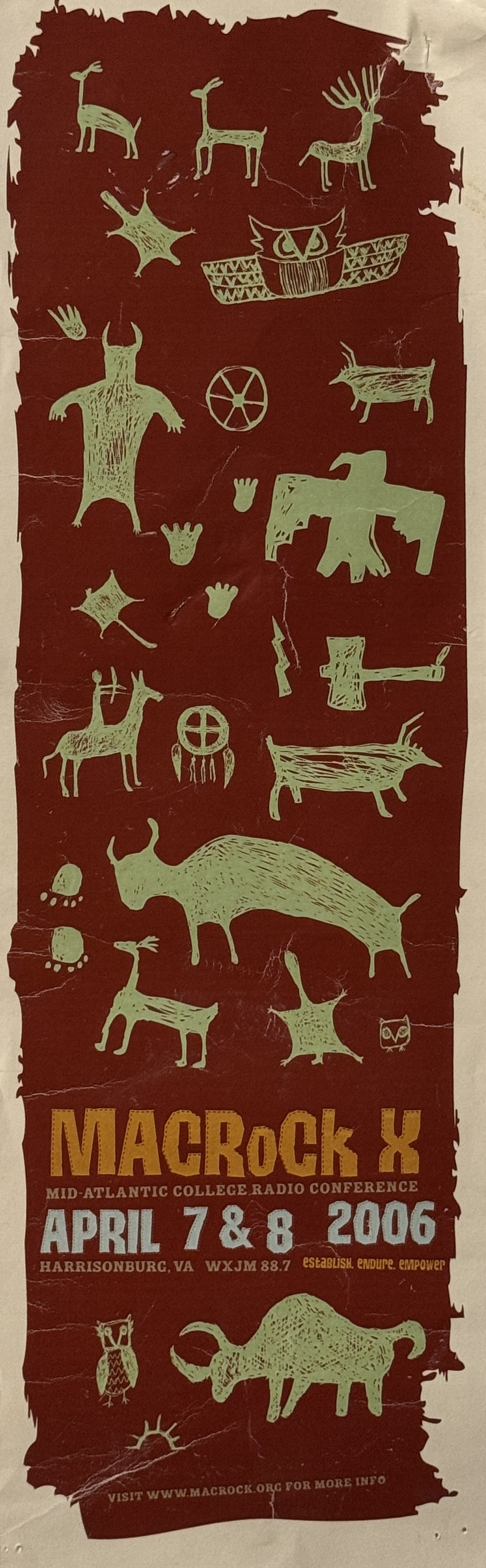
Festival Poster from MACRoCK 2006

Festival organizers "skipped" 2007 festival as they reorganized, hosting an event again in 2008. Cutting its ties with JMU and incorporating as a not-for-profit, the festival moved from the university campus to downtown Harrisonburg. Now, an annually changing committee of around 10 volunteers organizes MACROCK, with the festival day help of many volunteers, most of which are still found at WXJM.

With a lineup of 75 bands in 2019, the festival draws between 700 and 800 attendees annually. Acts perform in locally-popular venues such as Little Grill Collective and Artful Dodger.

MACROCK XXI was held April 6 and 7, 2018. The 2020 festival, with a full lineup of musical acts, was cancelled due to COVID-19.

== Acts ==
The organizing committee selects musical acts annual on a “blind listening” basis where members listen to audio submissions and give each a score prior to viewing festival appearance applications. The committee also reaches out to certain bands that interest them.

Notable bands to perform at MACROCK have included Animal Collective, Archers of Loaf, Dismemberment Plan, Sufjan Stevens, Mates of State, Converge, Give up the ghost, Antibalas Afrobeat Orchestra, Of Montreal, Norma Jean, The Dillinger Escape Plan, Poison the Well, Bane, Superchunk, Elliott Smith (1997), An Albatross, Coheed and Cambria, Fugazi (2002), Best Coast, The War on Drugs (band), Screaming Females, S. Carey, The Bouncing Souls, Diarrhea Planet, Priests (band), Shana Falana, Drook, Mal Devisa, New England Patriots, Ono, Dogs on Acid, Crown Larks, Abdu Ali, Horrendous, Container, Buck Gooter, Dodomeki, Plattenbau, and Waxahatchee.
