= The Rocking-Horse Winner =

Short story by D. H. Lawrence

"The Rocking-Horse Winner" is a short story by D. H. Lawrence. It was first published in July 1926, in Harper's Bazaar and subsequently appeared in the first volume of Lawrence's collected short stories.

== Film and television adaptations ==
It was made into the full-length film The Rocking Horse Winner (1949), which was directed by Anthony Pelissier and starring John Howard Davies, Valerie Hobson and John Mills; the film was released in the United Kingdom in 1949 and in 1950 in the United States. It was also made into a TV film in 1977, and a 1993 film directed by Michael Almereyda that had appeared in various film festivals in 1997.

== Synopsis ==
The story describes a young, middle-class Englishwoman who "had no luck". Although outwardly successful, she is haunted by a sense of failure; her husband is a ne'er-do-well, and her work as a commercial artist does not earn as much as she would like. The family's life exceeds its income, and unspoken anxiety about money permeates the household. Her children, a son Paul and his two sisters, sense this anxiety; they even claim they can hear the house whispering "There must be more money".

Paul tells his Uncle Oscar Cresswell about betting on horse races with Bassett, the gardener. He has been placing bets using his pocket money, and he has won and saved £320. Sometimes he says he is "sure" of a winner for an upcoming race, and the horses he names do in fact win, sometimes at remarkable odds. Uncle Oscar and Bassett both place large bets on the horses Paul names.

After more winnings, Paul and Oscar arrange to give the mother a gift of £5,000, but the gift only lets her spend more. Disappointed, Paul tries harder than ever to be "lucky". As the Derby approaches, Paul is determined to learn the winner. Concerned about his health, his mother rushes home from a party and discovers his secret. He has been spending hours riding his rocking horse, sometimes all night long, until he "gets there", into a clairvoyant state where he can be sure of the winner's name.

Paul remains ill through the day of the Derby. Informed by Cresswell, Bassett has placed Paul's bet on Malabar, at fourteen to one. When he is informed by Bassett that he now has £80,000, Paul, excited, tells his mother how "lucky" he is. Paul dies the next night.

== Standard edition ==
- The Woman Who Rode Away and Other Stories (1928) edited by Dieter Mehl and Christa Jansohn, Cambridge University Press, 1995, pp. 230–243, ISBN 0-521-22270-2
