= Fairweather (band) =

American rock band

- Origin: Virginia, United States
- Genres: Indie rock, alternative rock, emo, pop punk, post-hardcore, punk rock
- Years active: 1999–2003; 2011–present
- Label: Equal Vision
- Members: Jay Littleton; Peter Tsouras; Shane Johnson; Ben Green; Ben Murphy; Nick Barkley
- Past members: Justin Cochran; Scott Joplin; Pat Broderick
- Website: www.fairweatherdc.com

Fairweather is an American rock band from Virginia, United States. They have released three full-length albums on Equal Vision Records: If They Move...Kill Them (2001), Lusitania (2003) and Fairweather (2014). The band also released several demos and the Alaska EP. In March 2011, after an 8-year hiatus, Fairweather formally announced a reunion show. The reunion show took place May 14, 2011 at the Black Cat in Washington, DC. The band continued with further shows since the reunion and subsequently recorded and released their third album in April 2014.

== Biography ==
Fairweather began playing shows in the Washington, D.C., and various suburbs of Fairfax, Virginia. After much critical acclaim of their first album, If They Move...Kill Them (named from The Wild Bunch) the band booked dates with Thursday, Brand New, Saves The Day, The Movielife, Piebald, Onelinedrawing, Codeseven, and other nationally known touring acts. The band announced that they would be disbanding in late 2003, not too long after their second full-length album, and finally disbanded in the winter of 2003. They played their final pre-hiatus show at St. Andrews Church in College Park, Maryland, with Darkest Hour, Age of Ruin, StarsHideFire, and Good Clean Fun. The setlist was:

- Blood on the Pages
- Whatever it Takes
- Soundtrack to the Ride
- Lusitania
- Letter of Intent
- Let's Hear it for Dartanian
- Still Paradise
- Concrete Atlas
- The Treachery of Images
- South Street 1am
- Casting Curses
- The Culling Song
- If They Move...Kill Them

Their reunion show lasted just over one hour and featured 13 songs plus a two-song encore. The set featured songs from all of their three albums and set was as follows:

- If They Move... Kill Them
- Soundtrack To The Ride
- Lusitania
- Letter of Intent
- Blood On The Pages
- Young Brash Hopeful
- The Treachery of Images
- I Dread the Time When Your Mouth Begins To Call Me Hunter
- Concrete Atlas
- Still Paradise
- Burning Bridges Keep Warm
- Casting Curses
- Whatever It Takes
- Mercer Island (encore)
- Let's Hear It For Dartanian (encore)

== Albums and EPs ==
Release date	Title	Label
February 20, 2001	If They Move...Kill Them	Equal Vision Records
August 20, 2002	Alaska	Equal Vision Records
July 11, 2003	Lusitania	Equal Vision Records
April 1, 2014	Fairweather	Equal Vision Records

== Members ==
On Lusitania and Alaska

- Jay Littleton - vocals
- Ben Green - guitar
- Peter Tsouras - guitar
- Shane Johnson - drums, bass (studio)
- Ben Murphy - bass (live)

On If They Move...Kill Them

- Jay Littleton - vocals
- Ben Green - guitar
- Scott Joplin - guitar
- Pat Broderick - drums
- Justin Cochran - bass
- Eric Burroughs - bass (live)
