= Sense Field =

American post-hardcore band

- Origin: California, United States
- Genres: Post-hardcore; emo; alternative rock; indie rock; hardcore punk
- Years active: 1990–2004, 2012–2013
- Labels: Revelation, Warner Bros., Nettwerk
- Past members: Jon Bunch; Chris Evenson; Rob Pfeiffer; Rodney Sellars; John Stockberger; Scott McPherson; Ian Fowles

Sense Field was an American post-hardcore band from Harbor City, California, formed in 1990. They released six albums until their disbandment in 2004, although they briefly reformed for two Revelation Records anniversary shows in 2012 and 2013. Frontman Jon Bunch committed suicide in 2016, and the remaining band members performed at a pair of memorial shows that same year.

== History ==
=== Initial career (1990–2004) ===
Formed in 1990, Sense Field originally consisted of vocalist Jon Bunch, guitarist Chris Evenson, guitarist Rodney Sellars, bassist John Stockberger, and drummer Scott McPherson. They were one of several contemporary bands to popularize the post-hardcore or "emo" subgenre. Sense Field self-released a few demos before getting signed to Revelation Records. Revelation released Sense Field in 1993, as the label combined the band's previous offerings, improved the overall quality, and added two then-new songs. That same year, Sense Field released their proper full-length album Killed for Less. To support the album, the group went on a condensed European tour, playing 49 shows in 54 days. In 1996, Revelation issued the band's third major release, Building. Shortly after, however, Sense Field signed with the major label Warner Bros. Records.

Building was then reissued on the major label for wider distribution (with "Different Times" as the album's lead single). After the reissue of Building, Sense Field headlined a tour of the US, followed by an appearance on the 1996 iteration of the Warped Tour. Afterwards, problems within the label caused the band to sit in limbo for five years as Warner re-staffed multiple times. In 1999, Sense Field completed an album titled Under the Radar, and numerous copies were issued, albeit not on a wide commercial scale. A proper retail release was cancelled, and Sense Field were quickly released from their contract, although they won the rights to the Under the Radar material. In early 2000, the lineup shifted for the first time as Rob Pfeiffer replaced McPherson on drums.

Eventually the band recorded additional songs and partially reworked some of the Under the Radar tracks, which led to the album Tonight and Forever in September 2001 via the Canadian independent label Nettwerk Records. While Sense Field had been considered an influential band within their scene since their inception, the band achieved commercial success in 2002 with the single "Save Yourself". The song was included on the band's album Tonight and Forever as well as on the soundtrack to Roswell. The success of the song allowed the band to perform on late night television shows such as The Tonight Show and The Late Late Show. Sense Field also toured alongside Goo Goo Dolls in 2002. Later that same year, Sellars departed from the band when his wife and daughter were involved in an accident. A Department of Defense employee had run a red light and hit their vehicle, and as a result Sellars' daughter became paralyzed from the waist down. Sense Field remained as a quartet at that point. The group quickly followed up with the 2003 album Living Outside. It became their only album to chart, reaching No. 37 on the US Heatseekers Albums chart. Ian Fowles joined the band as their second guitarist for a short co-headlining US tour with Hey Mercedes. Sense Field then announced their breakup in January 2004.

=== Subsequent events (2005–2016) ===
Following the demise of Sense Field the band members went on to other outfits. Bunch became the vocalist of Further Seems Forever. They released one album with Bunch in the lineup before they disbanded. Bunch then went on to form the post-hardcore band War Generation, and the tongue-in-cheek punk rock band Lucky Scars. McPherson became a sought-after session and touring player, and he was also a member of both Elliott Smith and Neil Finn's touring bands. Sellars created the shoegaze revivalist outfit, The Year Zero. In 2009, after nearly seven years in the courts, a jury awarded Sellars' daughter $55 million from the US government due to the 2002 accident caused by a government employee. Evenson appeared in tandem with The Juliana Theory's Brett Detar for a song under the Belasana moniker (featured on the 2004 holiday compilation Maybe This Christmas Tree). Stockberger moved to Texas and became a yoga teacher. Pfeiffer went on to record the theme song for Last Week Tonight. He also formed the power pop band Valley Lodge.

Sense Field reunited for Revelation Records' "25 Year Anniversary Show" on June 7, 2012 at The Glass House in Pomona, California. As a warmup to that show, they played The Slide Bar in Fullerton, California on June 6, 2012. They also played another anniversary show in Chicago on January 6, 2013. All three shows featured the original lineup of Bunch on vocals, Evenson on guitar, Sellars on guitar, and McPherson on drums, in addition to Fowles on bass (since Stockberger wasn't able to attend).

Bunch died by suicide on January 31, 2016 at the age of 45. The band reunited twice afterwards, first on March 20, 2016 at The Yost in Orange County and then on June 25, 2016 at The TLA in Philadelphia. Both shows served as fundraisers for Bunch's son, Jack.

== Members ==
- Jon Bunch – vocals (1990–2004, 2012–2013); died 2016
- Chris Evenson – guitar (1990–2004, 2012–2013)
- John Stockberger – bass (1990–2004)
- Rodney Sellars – guitar (1990–2002, 2012–2013)
- Scott McPherson – drums (1990–2000, 2012–2013)
- Rob Pfeiffer – drums (2000–2004)
- Ian Fowles – guitar, bass (2003–2004, 2012–2013) (Note: Fowles played as a touring guitarist from 2003 to 2004, essentially replacing Sellars. He then replaced Stockberger as bassist for the live shows in 2012 and 2013.)

== Discography ==
=== Albums ===
- Sense Field (1994, Revelation Records) (Note: Released as a compilation of the band's previous demos/EPs, plus two additional songs, although said material was never released properly beforehand.)
- Killed for Less (1994, Revelation Records)
- Building (1996, Warner Bros. Records/Revelation Records)
- Under the Radar (1999, Warner Bros. Records) (Note: This album was finished and separate promotional copies were issued, but the full retail release was unexpectedly halted by the label, and thus the band reworked some of the material for their subsequent album.)
- Tonight and Forever (2001, Nettwerk Records)
- Living Outside (2003, Nettwerk Records)

=== Singles and EPs ===
- "Tripoem" (1990, Independent)
- Sense Field EP (1991, Run H2O)
- Premonitions EP (1992, Run H2O)
- "Papercut" (1995, Revelation Records)
- "Found You" (1995, Revelation Records)
- "Different Times" (1996, Revelation Records/Warner Bros. Records)
- "Overstand" (1996, Warner Bros. Records)
- "Every Reason" (1997, Crank! A Record Company) (Note: Released as a split single with Jimmy Eat World and Mineral.)
- "War of the Worlds" (1999, Warner Bros. Records)
- Part of the Deal EP (2000, GrapeOS)
- "Anniversary" (2000, Good Life Recordings/CI Records) (Note: Released as a split single with Onelinedrawing.)
- "Beautiful, Beautiful" (2001, CI Records)
- "Fun Never Ends" (2001, Nettwerk Records)
- "Save Yourself" (2002, Nettwerk Records)
- "I Refuse" (2003, Nettwerk Records)
- "On Your Own" (2003, Nettwerk Records/CI Records)
- The Musings Of EP (2004, Daymare Recordings) (Note: Released as a split EP with Running From Dharma.)

=== Compilations ===
- To End a Letter (2004, Daymare Recordings)
- Jon Bunch Benefit Collection (2016, Revelation Records)
