= Jimmy Eat World discography =

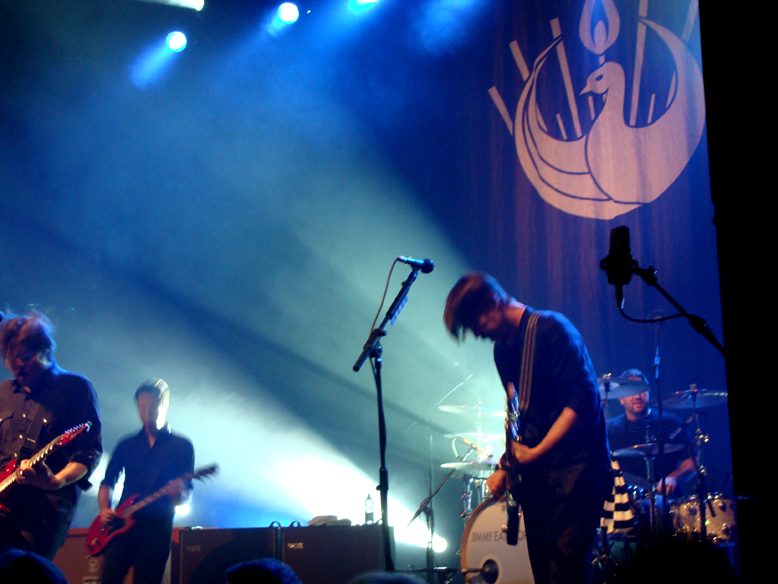
- Jimmy Eat World performing at O2 Academy 2 in the UK, February 2008
- Studio albums: 10
- Extended plays: 7
- Live albums: 5
- Compilation albums: 1
- Singles: 23
- Video albums: 1
- Music videos: 19
- Split singles: 8
- Demo albums: 3

The American rock band Jimmy Eat World has released ten studio albums, twenty-three singles, seven extended plays, three live albums, one compilation album, one video album, and one song on the "various artists" compilation What's Mine Is Yours.

Jimmy Eat World formed in 1993 and released their debut EP, entitled One, Two, Three, Four, in 1994 on Wooden Blue Records; their debut self-titled studio album Jimmy Eat World was released later that year on the same label. The band then signed a record contract with Capitol Records and released Static Prevails in 1996, while also concurrently releasing a series of split 7-inch singles and a cassette with other bands, such as Less Than Jake, Sense Field, and Mineral. In 1999, Jimmy Eat World released their third album Clarity, which peaked at number 47 on the German Albums Chart and number 30 on the Billboard Top Heatseekers chart.

The band's commercial breakthrough occurred in 2001 with the release of several singles from their fourth studio album Bleed American. Four singles from the album charted within the top 20 of the Hot Modern Rock Tracks chart, while "The Middle" and "Sweetness" respectively peaked at number one and number two; "The Middle" also peaked at number 5 on the Billboard Hot 100 chart. Bleed American was certified platinum in Canada and America, and silver in the United Kingdom.

In 2004 Jimmy Eat World released Futures, which was their first album to appear in the top ten of the Billboard 200 chart. Futures featured the single "Pain", a song that was their second number one on the Hot Modern Rock Tracks chart and the only Jimmy Eat World single to be certified gold in the US. The band's sixth album, Chase This Light, was released in 2007 and became the band's highest-peaking album when it reached number five on the Billboard 200. Invented was then released in 2010, and this was followed by Damage in 2013, Integrity Blues in 2016, and Surviving in 2019.

== Albums ==
=== Studio albums ===
List of studio albums, with selected chart positions and certifications
Title	Album details	Peak chart positions										Certifications
Title	Album details	US	AUS	AUT	CAN	GER	IRL	JPN	SCO	SWI	UK	Certifications
Jimmy Eat World	Released: December 1994; Label: Wooden Blue (I.S.Y. 004); Format: CD	—	—	—	—	—	—	—	—	—	—	
Static Prevails	Released: July 23, 1996; Label: Capitol (32404); Format: CD, CS, DL, LP+7" vinyl	—	—	—	—	—	—	—	—	—	—	
Clarity	Released: February 23, 1999; Label: Capitol (55950); Format: CD, DL, LP	— (Note: Clarity did not enter the US Billboard 200, but peaked at number 30 on the Top Heatseekers Chart.)	—	—	—	47	—	—	—	—	—	
Bleed American (Note: Copies of Bleed American released from 2002–08 were retitled Jimmy Eat World after the September 11 attacks. Beginning with the deluxe edition printed in 2008, the official title "Bleed American" was restored.)	Released: July 24, 2001; Label: DreamWorks (4503342); Format: CD, CS, DL, LP	31	54	—	—	20	—	—	45	—	62	RIAA: 2× Platinum; BPI: Gold; MC: Platinum; RMNZ: Platinum
Futures	Released: October 19, 2004; Label: Interscope (000335812); Format: CD, CS, DL, LP	6	27	—	7	33	51	—	23	65	22	RIAA: Gold; BPI: Gold; MC: Gold
Chase This Light	Released: October 16, 2007; Label: Interscope (000992402); Format: CD, DL, LP	5	30	73	11	54	56	39	28	94	27	
Invented	Released: September 28, 2010; Label: DGC/Interscope; Format: CD, DL, LP	11	20	67	21	44	50	40	31	73	29	
Damage	Released: June 11, 2013; Label: RCA (88883-72509-2); Format: CD, DL, LP	14	26	54	—	41	91	73	39	55	38	
Integrity Blues	Released: October 21, 2016; Label: RCA (88985–32403); Format: CD, DL, LP	17	27	—	70	35	41	98	15	80	21	
Surviving	Released: October 18, 2019; Label: RCA; Format: CD, CS, DL, LP	90	56	72	—	44	—	212	13	70	21	
"—" denotes releases that did not chart or were not released in that territory.

=== Compilation albums ===
List of compilation albums
Title	Album details
Singles	Released: August 8, 2000; Label: Big Wheel Recreation; Format: CD, DL

=== Live albums ===
List of live albums, with selected chart positions
Title	Album details	Peak chart positions		
Title	Album details	US	US Rock	UK Rock
Chase This Light Tour 2008	Released: February 2008; Label: Interscope; Three 2-CD Sets (February 18, 19, 20)	—	—	—
Clarity Live	Released: April 7, 2009; Label: Self-released; Format: DL	—	—	—
iTunes Festival: London 2011	Released: July 18, 2011; Label: Turkey on Rye Music; Format: DL	—	—	—
iTunes Session	Released: July 22, 2013; Label: Exotic Location Recordings; Format: DL	156	44	20
iTunes Festival: London 2013	Released: November 11, 2013; Label: Exotic Location Recordings; Format: DL	—	—	—
"—" denotes releases that did not chart or were not released in that territory.

== Extended plays ==
List of extended plays
Title	EP details
One, Two, Three, Four	Released: 1994; Label: Wooden Blue (i.s.y. 001); Format: 7" vinyl
Jimmy Eat World	Released: December 14, 1998; Label: Fueled by Ramen (FBR-020); Format: CD, 10" vinyl
Good to Go EP	Released: March 12, 2002; Label: Universal (UICW-1021); Format: CD
Firestarter EP	Released: August 3, 2004; Label: Interscope; Format: CD, digital download
Christmas EP	Released: December 7, 2004; Label: Geffen; Format: Digital download
Stay on My Side Tonight	Released: October 4, 2005; Label: Interscope (B0005448-02); Format: CD, digital download, LP
Something(s) Loud	Released: November 14, 2025; Label: Exotic Location; Format: 12" vinyl

== Singles ==
Title	Year	Peak chart positions										Certifications	Album
Title	Year	US	US Alt.	AUS	CAN	FRA	IRL	NLD	NZ	SCO	UK	Certifications	Album
"Opener"	1995	—	—	—	—	—	—	—	—	—	—		Non-album single
"Call It in the Air"	1996	—	—	—	—	—	—	—	—	—	—		Static Prevails
"Lucky Denver Mint"	1999	—	—	—	—	—	—	—	—	—	—		Clarity
"Blister"	1999	—	—	—	—	—	—	—	—	—	—		Clarity
"Bleed American" (aka "Salt Sweat Sugar")	2001	—	18	—	—	—	—	—	—	59	60	RIAA: Gold; BPI: Silver	Bleed American
"The Middle"	2001	5	1	49	2	98	46	92	28	29	26	RIAA: 9× Platinum; BPI: 2× Platinum; RMNZ: 4× Platinum	Bleed American
"Last Christmas"	2001	—	—	—	—	—	—	—	—	—	—		Non-album single
"Sweetness"	2002	75	2	—	58	—	—	—	—	31	38	RIAA: 2× Platinum; BPI: Silver	Bleed American
"A Praise Chorus"	2002	—	16	—	—	—	—	—	—	—	—		Bleed American
"Pain"	2004	93	1	—	26	—	—	—	—	40	38	RIAA: Gold	Futures
"Work"	2004	— (Note: "Work" did not enter the Billboard Hot 100, but peaked at number 10 on the Bubbling Under Hot 100 Singles chart, which acts as an extension to the Hot 100.)	6	—	—	—	—	—	—	54	49		Futures
"Futures"	2005	—	16	—	—	—	—	—	—	—	—		Futures
"Big Casino"	2007	— (Note: "Big Casino" did not enter the Billboard Hot 100, but peaked at number 22 on the Bubbling Under Hot 100 Singles chart, which acts as an extension to the Hot 100.)	3	—	59	—	—	—	—	40	119		Chase This Light
"Always Be"	2007	—	14	—	—	—	—	—	—	8	37		Chase This Light
"My Best Theory"	2010	— (Note: "My Best Theory" did not enter the Billboard Hot 100, but peaked at number 14 on the Bubbling Under Hot 100 Singles chart, which acts as an extension to the Hot 100.)	2	—	—	—	—	—	—	—	— (Note: "My Best Theory" did not enter the UK Singles Chart, but peaked at number 23 on the UK Physical Singles Chart Top 100.)		Invented
"Coffee and Cigarettes"	2011	—	23	—	—	—	—	—	—	—	—		Invented
"I Will Steal You Back"	2013	—	23	—	—	—	—	—	—	—	—		Damage
"Damage"	2013	— (Note: "Damage" did not enter the Billboard Hot 100, but peaked at number 6 on the Billboard Hot Singles Sales chart.)	—	—	—	—	—	—	—	—	—		Damage
"Sure and Certain"	2016	—	10	—	—	—	—	—	—	—	—		Integrity Blues
"Get Right"	2017	—	—	—	—	—	—	—	—	—	—		Integrity Blues
"Love Never" / "Half Heart"	2018	—	—	—	—	—	—	—	—	—	—		Non-album single
"All the Way (Stay)"	2019	—	—	—	—	—	—	—	—	—	—		Surviving
"Love Never"	2019	—	31	—	—	—	—	—	—	—	—		Surviving
"Something Loud"	2022	—	21	—	—	—	—	—	—	—	—		Something(s) Loud
"Place Your Debts"	2022	—	—	—	—	—	—	—	—	—	—		Something(s) Loud
"Telepath"	2023	—	—	—	—	—	—	—	—	—	—		Non-album single
"Failure"	2025	—	—	—	—	—	—	—	—	—	—		Something(s) Loud
"—" denotes releases that did not chart or were not released in that territory.

=== Promotional singles ===
Title	Year	Peak chart positions	Album
Title	Year	US Alt.	Album
"Nothing Wrong"	2004	—	Futures
"Let It Happen"	2007	—	Chase This Light
"You Are Free"	2016	—	Integrity Blues
"You with Me"	2016	—	Integrity Blues
"555"	2019	—	Surviving

=== Split singles ===
List of split singles
Title	single details
Christie Front Drive / Jimmy Eat World (with Christie Front Drive)	Released: 1995; Format: 7" vinyl; Label: Wooden Blue
Jimmy Eat World / Emery Split 7" (with Emery)	Released: 1995; Format: 7" vinyl; Label: Ordinary
Jimmy Eat World / Blueprint Split 7" (with Blueprint)	Released: 1996; Format: 7" vinyl; Label: Abridged
Jimmy Eat World / Less Than Jake (with Less Than Jake)	Released: 1996; Format: Cassette; Label: Capitol
Jimmy Eat World / Sense Field / Mineral (with Sense Field and Mineral)	Released: 1997; Format: 7" vinyl; Label: Crank
J.E.W. / Jejune Split 7" (with Jejune)	Released: 1998; Format: 7" vinyl; Label: Big Wheel Recreation
Jebediah / Jimmy Eat World (with Jebediah)	Released: 2000; Format: 7" vinyl, CD; Label: Big Wheel Recreation
Taking Back Sunday / Jimmy Eat World (with Taking Back Sunday)	Released: 2005; Format: 7" vinyl; Label: Self-released

== Other charting and certified songs ==
Title	Year	Peak chart positions	Certifications	Album
Title	Year	US Pop	Certifications	Album
"Hear You Me"	2001	—	RIAA: Platinum; BPI: Silver	Bleed American
"Chase This Light"	2007	99		Chase This Light
"—" denotes releases that did not chart or were not released in that territory.

== Video albums ==
Jimmy Eat World video albums
Title	Details	Certifications
Believe in What You Want	Released: October 19, 2004; Label: Interscope; Format: DVD-V	CAN: Gold

== Music videos ==
Title	Year	Director
"Rockstar"	1996	Richard Reines
"Lucky Denver Mint"	1999	Darren Doane
"Bleed American"	2001	Ross Richardson
"The Middle"	2001	Paul Fedor
"Sweetness"	2002	Tim Hope
"A Praise Chorus"	2002	Unknown
"Pain"	2004	Paul Fedor
"Work"	2005	Marc Webb
"Big Casino"	2007	Christopher Sims
"Always Be"	2008	The Malloys
"My Best Theory"	2010	Ron Winter
"I Will Steal You Back"	2013	Adam Porter
"Sure and Certain"	2016	Flynt Floss
"Get Right"	2017	Unknown
"Love Never"	2018	Unknown
"half heart"	2018	Unknown
"All The Way (Stay)"	2019	Daniel Carberry
"555"	2019	Jim Adkins and Michael Gill
"Something Loud"	2022	Jimmy Eat World and Austin Gavin
"Place Your Debts"	2022	Jim Adkins

== Other original appearances ==
- "Carbon Scoring" – Back from the Dead Motherfucker
- "Seventeen" (Unreleased demo) – Never Been Kissed: Music from the Motion Picture
- "Lucky Denver Mint" (Alternate version) – Never Been Kissed compact disc soundtrack
- "New Religion" – The Duran Duran Tribute Album
- "Opener" – What's Mine Is Yours
- "I Love You All the Time (Play It Forward Campaign)" - I Love You All the Time (Play It Forward Campaign) - Single
- "My Enemy" – 30 Days, 50 Songs
