= A Praise Chorus =

Promotional single by Jimmy Eat World

from the album Bleed American
- Released: 2002
- Genre: Emo; pop-punk; punk rock
- Length: 4:03
- Label: DreamWorks R6538
- Songwriters: Jimmy Eat World; Tommy James; Peter P. Lucia Jr.

Jimmy Eat World singles chronology
"Sweetness" (2002)	"A Praise Chorus" (2002)	"Pain" (2004)

"A Praise Chorus" is a song by the American rock band Jimmy Eat World from their fourth album, Bleed American (2001). Written by the band and produced by Mark Trombino, it was released as the album's fourth single in 2002. Musically, "A Praise Chorus" was developed around a dynamic of "tension and resolve", using rhythmic interplay, restrained verses, and gradual builds to heighten the impact of its chorus.

The song culminates in a guest appearance by Davey von Bohlen of the Promise Ring, whose bridge weaves together references to several classic rock and alternative songs, inspiring the track's title. The song reached number 16 on Billboard's Hot Modern Rock Tracks chart.

== Background ==
The title "A Praise Chorus" was inspired by a conversation Adkins had about the formulaic nature of contemporary Christian music, whose emphasis on communal singing and audience participation he contrasted with rock music. He described the title as an ironic juxtaposition for a song celebrating "the unquantifiable release" of rock and roll.

== Composition ==
Frontman Jim Adkins first demoed "A Praise Chorus" with collaborator Aaron M. Wendt in Wendt's converted garage, which had been outfitted with a Soundcraft mixing console and TASCAM DA-38 recorder. Adkins later said Bleed American marked the first time the band consciously considered arrangement as a compositional tool, explaining that they had become increasingly deliberate about ensuring every musical part served a specific purpose. Rather than applying formal songwriting techniques, however, the group generally arrived at those decisions instinctively, choosing ideas that simply "felt right."

Because the song begins with an aggressive, high-energy opening, the band focused on ensuring the chorus remained impactful. Adkins described the composition as being built around "tension and resolve", with quieter, palm-muted passages and restrained vocals providing contrast before gradually building toward the final chorus and outro. Rather than relying on changing chord progressions, the arrangement derives much of its momentum from rhythmic interplay: Adkins' droning guitar part remains largely static while guitarist Tom Linton follows the bassline, creating movement through strumming patterns and cadence.

Drummer Zach Lind later described the song as an "economical" composition in which each instrument contributes to a continuous sense of tension before the eventual release. Compared with the finished recording, the original demo featured a different kick drum pattern during the verses. Lind later simplified the rhythm for the album version to better complement the bassline and emphasize the song's swing-like cadence.

=== Bridge ===
The bridge proved particularly difficult to complete. Early attempts—a guitar lead, an organ part—failed to provide the desired increase in intensity. They also tried scat-style vocal melodies (a repetition of "Fast action/Come on, come on, come on/Fast action/So what'cha here for"), but were also unenthused with it. Producer Mark Trombino ultimately suggested inviting Davey von Bohlen of the Promise Ring, who is referenced in the lyric "So come on Davey, sing me something that I know", to contribute guest vocals. Von Bohlen recorded his parts remotely from a studio in Milwaukee after receiving a rough mix of the song, an uncommon form of long-distance digital collaboration at the time. His contribution—consisting of lyrics referencing songs he imagined Adkins would know—ultimately replaced the earlier ideas. Although initially uncertain about the result, Trombino later came to regard the guest appearance as exactly the unexpected element the song required, while Lind described it as a "perfect" addition that could no longer be imagined any other way.

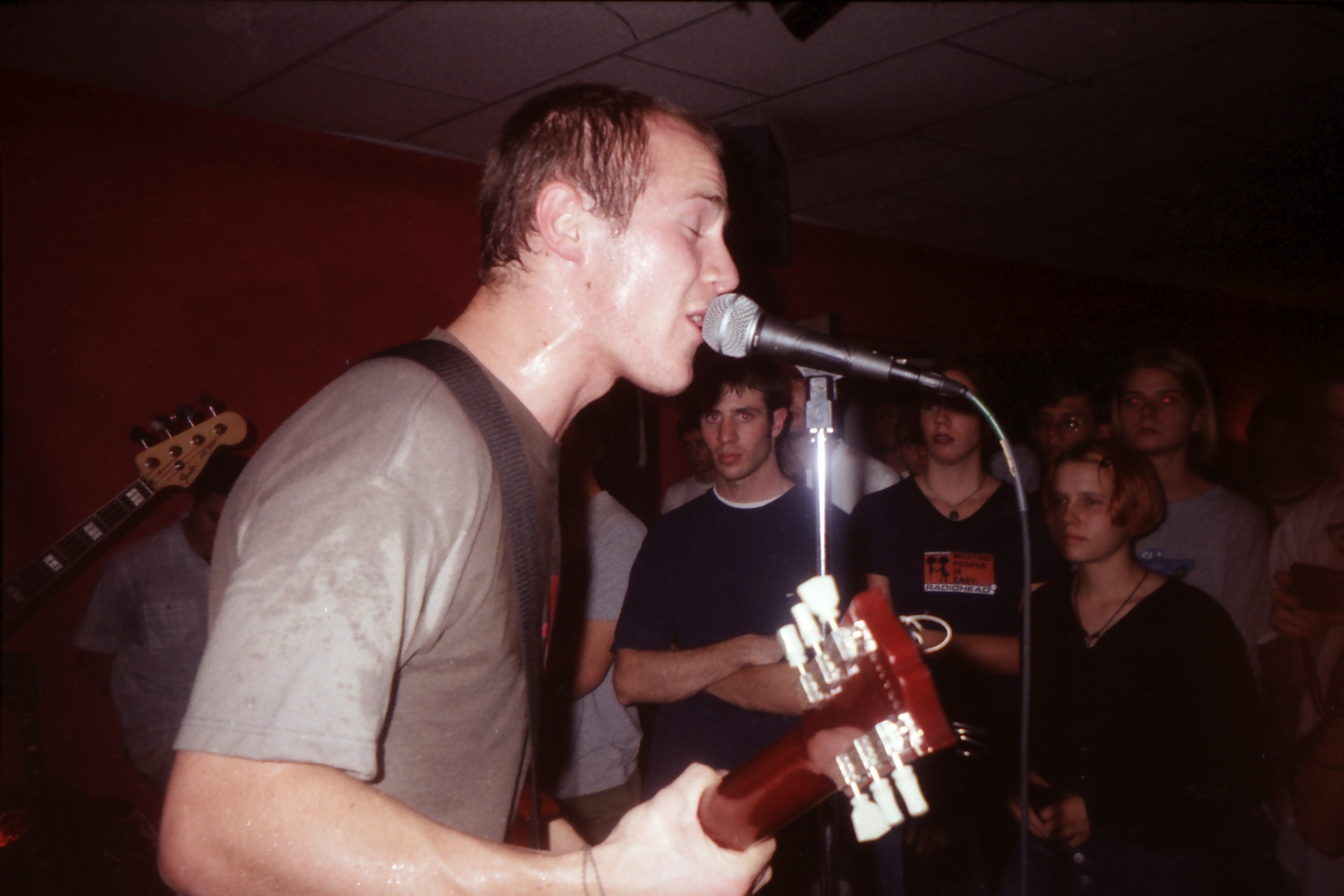
Davey von Bohlen, who sings the song's bridge, in 1997.

After the second stanza, references to seven songs become the "praise chorus" of the title. The first line is sung continuously in the background before the other six are sung over it.

1. Tommy James and the Shondells – "Crimson and Clover" – "Crimson and clover, over and over", sung continuously in the background.
2. Madness – "Our House" – "Our house in the middle of the street."
3. The Promise Ring – "Why Did Ever We Meet" – "Why did we ever meet?"
4. Bad Company – "Rock 'n' Roll Fantasy" – "[Started] my rock 'n' roll fantasy."
5. They Might Be Giants – "Don't Let's Start" – "Don't, don't, don't let's start."
6. The Promise Ring – "All of My Everythings" – "Why did we ever part?"
7. Mötley Crüe – "Kickstart My Heart" – "Kickstart my rock 'n roll heart."

== Reception ==
The song was selected as the album's fourth and final single instead of "Hear You Me". Music executive Luke Wood, who served as the band's A&R representative at DreamWorks Records, later said he believed the decision was a mistake, arguing that "Hear You Me" would have been the stronger choice.

== Track listing ==
The Middle/A Praise Chorus AUS Tour EP

1. "The Middle"
2. "A Praise Chorus"
3. "Bleed American" (live from the 9:30 Club, Washington DC 6/4/02)
4. "Firestarter" (non-album) (The Prodigy cover)
5. "The Middle" (acoustic)

Promotional compact disc

1. "A Praise Chorus"
2. "Authority Song" (demo version)

== Personnel ==
Personnel adapted from CD booklet

Jimmy Eat World

- Jim Adkins – lead vocals, lead guitar, percussion
- Tom Linton – rhythm guitar
- Rick Burch – bass guitar
- Zach Lind – drums

Additional personnel

- Davey von Bohlen – additional vocals

== Charts ==
Chart (2002)	Peak position
US Alternative Airplay (Billboard)	16
