= Sweetness (Jimmy Eat World song) =

Single by Jimmy Eat World

from the album Bleed American
- Released: June 3, 2002
- Genre: Emo; post-hardcore
- Length: 3:40
- Label: DreamWorks
- Songwriter: Jimmy Eat World

Jimmy Eat World singles chronology
"Last Christmas" (2001)	"Sweetness" (2002)	"A Praise Chorus" (2002)

"Sweetness" is a song by American rock band Jimmy Eat World, from their fourth studio album, Bleed American (2001). Written by the band and produced by Mark Trombino, it was released as the album's second single in June 2002. Although first written and recorded during the Clarity sessions, the song was omitted from that album after Capitol Records declined to include it. Following the band's departure from the label, "Sweetness" was re-recorded for Bleed American.

Musically, "Sweetness" is driven by layered guitars, energetic drumming, and a prominent wordless "whoa-oh" refrain that serves as its central hook. Adkins deliberately wrote the song around a simple, economical structure built on recurring call-and-response vocal motifs. The lyrics explore emotional dependence and the search for validation through relationships. It incorporates influences from post-hardcore and second-wave emo. The recording employs layered percussion, combining contrasting drum sounds to enhance the song's frenetic energy.

Building on the success of the preceding single "The Middle", "Sweetness" became another of Jimmy Eat World's best-known songs. It reached number two on Billboard's Hot Modern Rock Tracks chart, number 75 on the Billboard Hot 100, and charted in both the United Kingdom and Scotland. The song received positive reviews from critics, who praised its hook and energetic arrangement, while its music video, directed by Tim Hope, combined live-action performance footage with stop-motion, rotoscoping, and computer animation.

== Background ==
Frontman Jim Adkins first developed "Sweetness" in his bedroom studio in Tempe, Arizona in 1998. The song's frenetic pace and strumming pattern were influenced by English indie rock band the Wedding Present, with Adkins later describing it as a "bizarro version" of one of their songs. Drummer Zach Lind was immediately enthusiastic about the demo, which was unfinished and contained placeholder lyrics, later recalling that he believed "something was wrong with people" if audiences failed to embrace it. The band soon began performing the song live, where its singalong quality quickly made it an audience favorite and, at times, an opening number.

While awaiting the release of their third album, Clarity (1999), the band became increasingly enthusiastic about "Sweetness" and hoped to add it to the record. After preparing a new demo and incorporating the song into their live sets, A&R executive Craig Aaronson encouraged the group to record a finished version to determine whether it warranted inclusion on the album. The song was recorded at Mad Hatter Studios, with the band intentionally taking a more ambitious approach than on the demo. Capitol Records, however, remained largely indifferent to the group and ultimately declined to include the track on Clarity. That original recording was later released on the album's expanded 2007 reissue.

== Recording ==
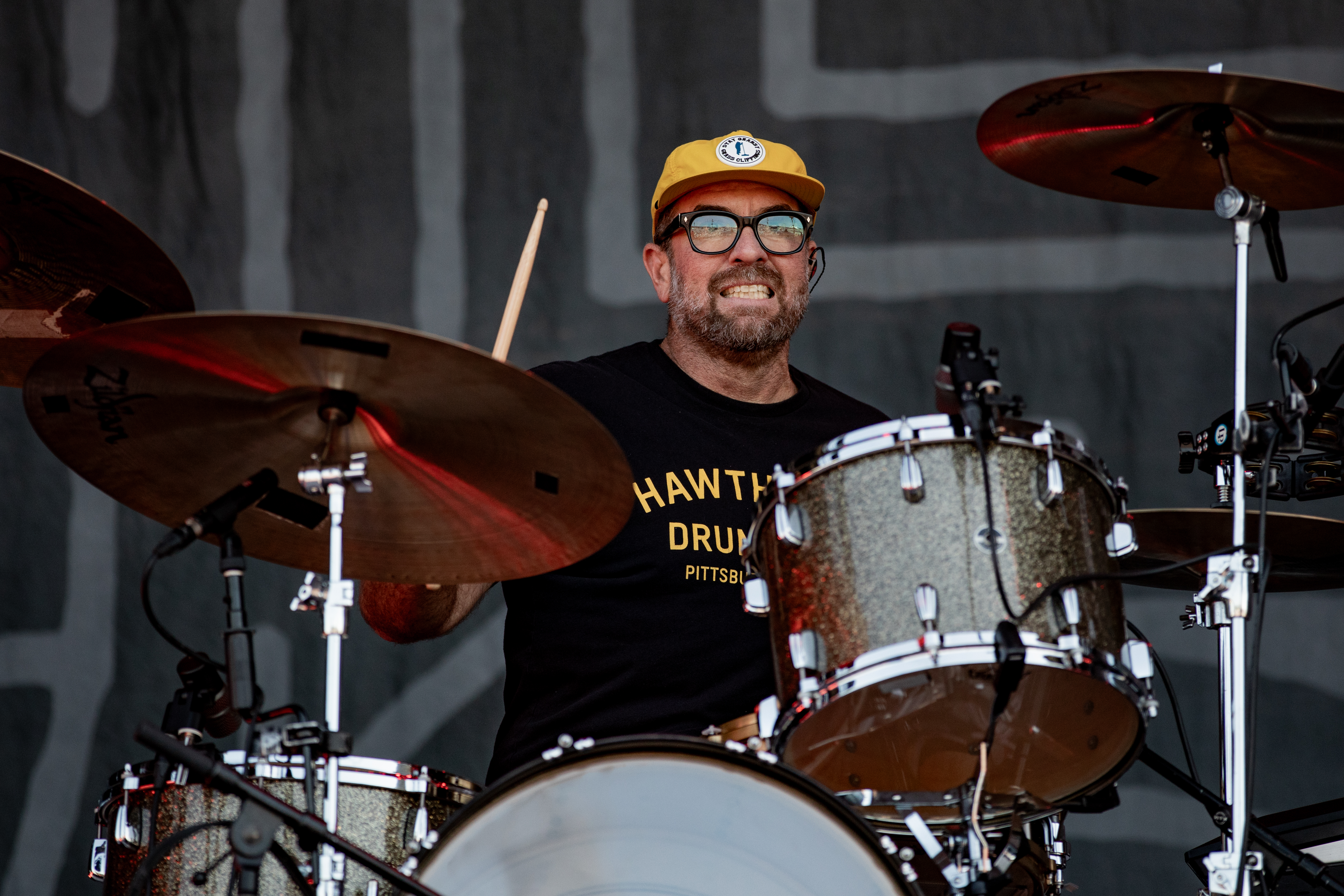
Drummer Zach Lind, seen here in 2025, performed multiple layered drum parts for "Sweetness".

Following their departure from Capitol, Jimmy Eat World began self-funding what would become Bleed American. Because Capitol retained ownership of the original master recording, the band re-recorded "Sweetness" for the new album. Lind later described the new version as more rollicking and heavier than its predecessor. Produced by Mark Trombino, the recording sessions took place at Harddrive Studios in North Hollywood between October and November 2000, with one week reserved at Cherokee Studios for drum tracking. The finished recording features two layered drum performances. Most of the primary drum tracks were recorded in a large live room to achieve a clean, consistent sound, while additional percussion was captured in a small, acoustically "dead" vocal booth and blended into the mix for added texture. Similar production techniques were later employed on other Bleed American tracks, including "My Sundown."

The arrangement also incorporates multiple layers of guitar. Adkins described the parts as combining a primary rhythm tone with a thicker, heavier layer that enters during key moments such as the chorus. Rather than relying on saturated guitar tones, the band sought to preserve the clarity of the strumming patterns. For the bridge, the group intentionally avoided a traditional guitar solo, instead introducing a melodic passage with alternating harmonies and piano accompaniment. The piano part drew inspiration from "Rollercoaster" by the Jesus and Mary Chain. The recording also employed several studio effects, including a reversed piano sample that was digitally time-stretched to fit the section—an uncommon production technique at the time, given the relatively early state of digital recording technology.

== Composition ==
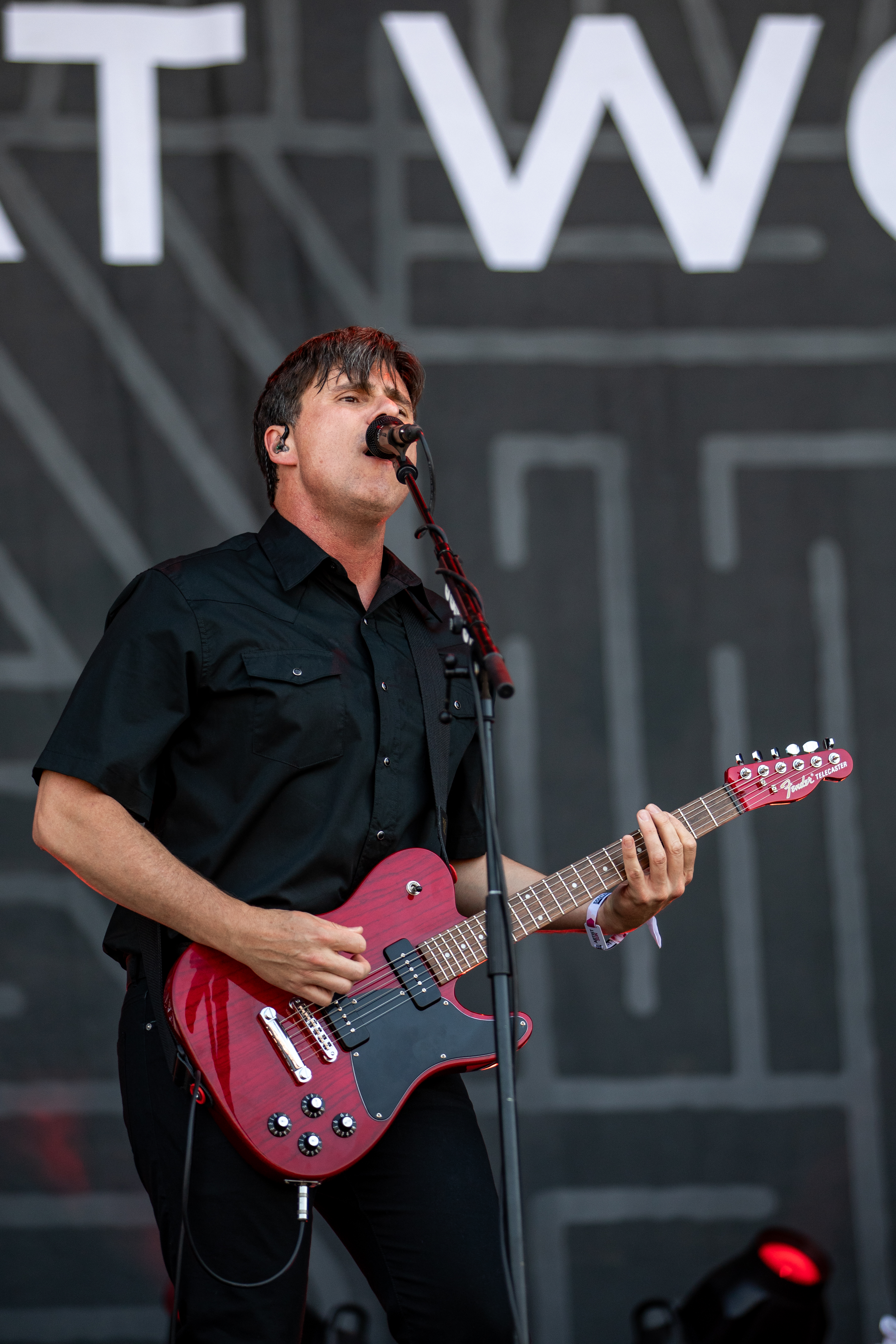
Frontman Jim Adkins developed the earliest version of "Sweetness" in his bedroom studio in Tempe, Arizona.

Although Adkins had never formally studied songwriting, he was fascinated by how other artists used memorable openings to immediately capture listeners' attention. He set out to write a song with a deliberately economical structure, built around little more than a verse and a recurring tag. An early demo featured a brief "whoa-oh" refrain, which the band gradually expanded into the song's central hook. As "Sweetness" evolved, the chorus became increasingly pronounced and distinct from the verses, ultimately forming the backbone of the composition through repeated variations and dynamic builds.

Adkins later said that "Sweetness" was one of the songs he was least confident about lyrically. Although he had developed a melody he liked, he struggled to write words for it and initially hesitated to present it to the band, feeling that the extensive use of wordless "whoa" vocals was insufficient. The whoah vocalizations were intended as a placeholder for other lyrics, though as the members were unable to come up with anything else, the parts remained. The drum beat was done in the style of U2 drummer Larry Mullen Jr.; it incorporates influences from post-hardcore and second-wave emo.

Lyrically, Adkins said "Sweetness" explores feelings of emotional unfulfillment and the search for validation through relationships. Explaining the opening line, "string from your tether unwinds", he clarified that the "tether" refers to an emotional bond, describing it as "an emotional connection that you can't break free from." Adkins said the song reflects the realization that seeking happiness and self-worth primarily through romantic relationships is ultimately unfulfilling.

== Commercial and critical reception ==
Prior to the release of Bleed American, Jimmy Eat World made several new songs, including "Sweetness", available through Napster so that fans could hear the material. Adkins later recalled being surprised when audiences overseas in Europe already knew the lyrics, describing it as an early indication of the Internet's growing influence on music discovery.

Building on the commercial success of "The Middle", "Sweetness" became another significant hit for Jimmy Eat World. It peaked at number two on Billboard's Alternative Airplay chart, while also reaching number 40 on the Adult Pop Airplay chart and number 75 on the all-genre Hot 100. In the United Kingdom, the single reached number 38 on the UK Singles Chart and number 31 in Scotland.

Like the rest of Bleed American, "Sweetness" was generally well received by critics. Imran Ahmed of NME praised "Sweetness" for its energetic power chords, enthusiastic performance, and infectious "whoa-oh" hook. Rolling Stone's Barry Walters described "Sweetness" as one of the album's strongest tracks, praising its tight musicianship and blend of emotional intensity with uplifting melodies. Charles A. Hohman of PopMatters described "Sweetness" as "pure, passionate, pop bliss", praising its singalong appeal. Aubin Paul of Punknews.org stated that "'Sweetness' called it "unbelievably catchy." Ryan Schreiber of Pitchfork criticized its "mindless" and wordless "whoa" refrain.

To promote the song, the band performed it on Saturday Night Live, in the episode hosted by Cameron Diaz.

== Music video ==
The video for "Sweetness", directed by Tim Hope, depicts the band performing the song in a bedroom while apparently recording a demo cassette. Compositing and various forms of animation (including stop-motion, rotoscoping, and computer animation) were used to add surreal elements throughout the video, as well as to show the band performing in different locations: a bar, a concert, and a recording studio.

The visual concept was intended to reflect the band's sudden rise to mainstream success following Bleed American, while emphasizing that the group's identity remained unchanged despite its newfound popularity. Frontman Jim Adkins explained that although "a lot can happen" to a band as its career progresses, the central idea was that "the band is essentially the same." Drummer Zach Lind similarly described the video as illustrating the band's journey rather than telling a conventional narrative.

== Track listing ==
UK 7" vinyl

1. "Sweetness" (3:40)
2. "Clarity" (live) (4:24)

UK CD1

1. "Sweetness" (3:40)
2. "Blister" (live) (5:52)
3. "Your New Aesthetic" (live) (2:46)

UK CD2

1. Sweetness
2. "A Praise Chorus" (live) (4:05)
3. "Lucky Denver Mint" (live) (3:11)
4. "Sweetness" (video)

Australian single (2002)

1. "Sweetness" (3:41)
2. "If You Don't, Don't" (live La Scala 10 November 2001) (4:29)
3. "Lucky Denver Mint" (live La Scala 10 November 2001) (3:12)
4. "Sweetness" (*.mov video) (3:59)
5. "Goodbye Sky Harbor" (*.mov video) (live La Scala 10 November 2001) (3:29)

== Personnel ==
Personnel adapted from CD booklet

- Jim Adkins – vocals, lead guitar, percussion
- Tom Linton – rhythm guitar
- Rick Burch – bass guitar
- Zach Lind – drums

== Charts ==
Chart (2002)	Peak position
Scottish Singles Sales (Official Charts)	31
UK Singles (Official Charts)	38
US Billboard Hot 100	75
US Adult Pop Airplay (Billboard)	40
US Alternative Airplay (Billboard)	2

== Certifications ==
Region	Certification	Certified units/sales
United Kingdom (BPI)	Silver	200,000^{‡}
United States (RIAA)	2× Platinum	2,000,000^{‡}
^{‡} Sales+streaming figures based on certification alone.

== In popular culture ==
The song was also featured on the soundtrack for the EA Sports video game NHL 2003.

Starting during the 2017–18 NHL season, the Florida Panthers used "Sweetness" as their goal song up until the conclusion of the 2021-22 NHL season. From the 2021-22 NHL season, the Anaheim Ducks have used the song after a home win.

The song is also available as a downloadable song in the music/rhythm game Rock Band 2.
