= Hear You Me =

2001 song by Jimmy Eat World

Song by Jimmy Eat World

from the album Bleed American
- Released: July 24, 2001
- Length: 4:45
- Label: DreamWorks
- Songwriters: Jim Adkins; Rick Burch; Zach Lind; Tom Linton
- Producer: Mark Trombino

"Hear You Me" is a song by American rock band Jimmy Eat World. It is the sixth track on the band's 2001 studio album Bleed American. The song was written in memory of Mykel and Carli Allan, two devoted fans who supported emerging bands. Their tragic death inspired the song’s themes of gratitude, loss, and remembrance. The song is a gentle, waltzing ballad using understated instrumentation—including piano, organ, and backing vocals from Rachel Haden.

Though not released as a single, "Hear You Me" became one of the band’s most popular songs. It has become a staple in film, television, and live performances, and has been covered by several artists.

== Background ==
“Hear You Me” was written in memory of Mykel and Carli Allan, two devoted fans known for supporting emerging bands. The sisters often opened their Los Angeles home to touring musicians, offering them a place to stay while they passed through the city. They also ran a Weezer fan club, and Weezer later paid tribute to them in a 1994 B-side. In July 1997, Mykel and Carli, along with their sister Trysta, were killed in a car accident on an icy stretch of highway in Colorado while traveling to a Weezer concert. The sisters frequently ended their fan-club newsletters with the phrase "hear you me," which later became the title of a 1998 tribute album dedicated to them. Members of Jimmy Eat World first met Mykel and Carli at a sparsely attended show in Portland, where the sisters were among the few people in the audience. After the performance, they offered the band a place to stay at their home.

"Hear You Me" was intended for Go Big Casino, Adkins' orchestral side project. It was included among a ten-track demo tape for the outfit that began circulating in 2000. Including it on Bleed American was an unusual choice for Jimmy Eat World, as it pushed the boundaries who they were. Adkins, in a later interview, described it as a "kind-of punk" move, highlighting how unironic and straight the song was for who they were as a band then. Drummer Zach Lind was taken with a demo version of the song. "I immediately thought that people were going to like and connect to [it]. I didn't know to what degree." The song features backing vocals from Rachel Haden, bassist for That Dog. The guitarwork uses a countermelody against the vocals; it includes a piano, organ, horns and Haden's vocals. The song is written in a 6/8 time signature.

== Reception ==
Although the band considered releasing the song as the fourth single from Bleed American, they ultimately chose "A Praise Chorus", worried that a power ballad might not resonate with their fanbase. Luke Wood, the band’s agent at DreamWorks, later described this decision as "probably the biggest A&R mistake I ever made," suggesting the track had strong potential to become a major hit. Despite this, "Hear You Me" grew to become one of Jimmy Eat World's most beloved songs. Its mournful tone has earned it recognition as one of the saddest "emo" tracks, and it has been frequently used to underscore poignant scenes in film and television.

Bob Mehr of the Dallas Observer extolled the song as "a remarkable bit of craftsmanship." Mark Vanderhoff from Allmusic complimented its gentle instrumentation, which he felt gives it an "understated beauty." Austin Saalman from Under the Radar called it the album's crowning emotional centerpiece. Billboard ranked it among the top 40 "deep cuts" among 21st century rock bands.

The song has been covered by artists from a variety of genres. Paramore covered the song live in 2007. Irish alt-rock duo Greywind covered the song in 2017. Alabama duo Muscadine Bloodline gave the song a country reimagining in 2023 as part of an emo covers project. In 2024, fellow pop-punkers Yellowcard covered the song and donated all proceeds to a close friend who had passed.

== Personnel ==
- Jim Adkins – vocals, guitar, percussion, piano
- Rick Burch – bass guitar
- Zach Lind – drums
- Tom Linton – guitar, organ
- Rachel Haden – vocals

== Certifications ==
Certifications and sales for "Hear You Me"
Region	Certification	Certified units/sales
United Kingdom (BPI)	Silver	200,000^{‡}
United States (RIAA)	Platinum	1,000,000^{‡}
^{‡} Sales+streaming figures based on certification alone.
