= Singles (Jimmy Eat World album) =

Compilation album by Jimmy Eat World
- Released: August 8, 2000
- Recorded: 1994–2000
- Genre: Emo
- Length: 37:32
- Labels: Big Wheel Recreation, Defiance, Golf

Jimmy Eat World chronology
Clarity (1999)	Singles (2000)	Bleed American (2001)

Singles is a compilation album of previously unreleased songs and B-sides by Jimmy Eat World. After being planned for release in July 2000, it was eventually released on August 8, 2000. After leaving Capitol Records, the compilation was released as a means of self-funding the recording sessions for their next album Bleed American.

== Artwork ==
The photo of a marquee featured prominently on the cover was taken at the Fox Theatre in Boulder, Colorado. It also features a photo of the Capitol Records Building in Hollywood, the headquarters of the band's former label.

== Track listing ==
Professional ratings
Review scores
Source	Rating
AllMusic	4/5 stars
Ox-Fanzine	Favorable

All songs written by Jimmy Eat World except Track 5 written by The Wedding Present. The band also intended to include their cover of Duran Duran's song "New Religion", which originally appeared on a tribute album, but were denied permission by the record label that originally released it. Jim Adkins' liner notes refer to "Opener" being the same recording from the 7-inch single w/ 77 Satellites, however the track used on this compilation is a demo recording with some differences to the lyrics.

No.	Title	Length
1.	"Opener" (Demo)	5:30
2.	"77 Satellites"	3:04
3.	"What Would I Say to You Now"	2:34
4.	"Speed Read"	2:42
5.	"Spangle" (The Wedding Present cover)	4:36
6.	"H Model"	2:11
7.	"Ramina"	4:04
8.	"Christmas Card"	2:53
9.	"Untitled"	2:33
10.	"Carbon Scoring"	2:36
11.	"Digits" (7-inch version)	4:24

Additional versions

UK bonus tracks
No.	Title	Length
12.	"The Most Beautiful Things"	3:52
13.	"Cautioners"	5:23

Japanese edition track listing
No.	Title	Length
1.	"Sweetness" (Demo)	3:38
2.	"Opener" (Demo)	5:30
3.	"H Model"	2:11
4.	"Better Than Oh"	3:07
5.	"Digits" (7-inch version)	4:24
6.	"What I Would Say to You Now"	2:34
7.	"Reason 346"	4:21
8.	"Carbon Scoring"	2:36
9.	"Christmas Card"	2:53
10.	"Untitled"	2:33
11.	"77 Satellites"	3:04
12.	"Spangle" (The Wedding Present cover)	4:36
13.	"Speed Read"	2:42
14.	"Ramina"	4:04

== Personnel ==
- Jim Adkins – guitar, lead vocals (3–5, 8, 9, 11), co-lead vocals (6)
- Rick Burch – bass (1–9)
- Mitchel Porter – bass (10-11)
- Zach Lind – drums
- Tom Linton – guitar, lead vocals (1, 2, 10), co-lead vocals (6)
- Various tracks engineered by John Agnello, Larry Elyea, Mark Trombino and Steve Revitte
