= Static Prevails =

Studio album by Jimmy Eat World
- Released: July 23, 1996
- Recorded: August and December 1995
- Studios: Sound City (Los Angeles); Big Fish (Encinitas, California)
- Genres: Emo; post-hardcore; punk rock
- Length: 51:28
- Label: Capitol
- Producers: Wes Kidd; Mark Trombino; Jimmy Eat World

Jimmy Eat World chronology
Jimmy Eat World (1994)	Static Prevails (1996)	Clarity (1999)

Singles from Static Prevails
- 1. "Call It in the Air" Released: August 26, 1996

Static Prevails is the second studio album by American rock band Jimmy Eat World, released on July 23, 1996, through Capitol Records. Following the release of the band's self-titled debut album (1994), they signed to Capitol in mid-1995 for further releases. Carrier member Rick Burch replaced bassist Mitchel Porter, who left to become a Mormon missionary. Recorded at Sound City in Los Angeles and Big Fish in Encinitas, California, Wes Kidd, Mark Trombino, and Jimmy Eat World acted as producers for the album.

Static Prevails saw the band move away from skate punk and pop-punk, and into a more aggressive sound consisting of post-hardcore, emo and punk rock. Preceded by a three-month United States tour, it was promoted with a mini tour of the country, a stint with the Smoking Popes and the Figgs, and a US tour with Sense Field in early 1997. A music video was filmed for "Rockstar", and "Call It in the Air" was released as the lead single in August 1996. The album received mixed reviews from music critics, who mostly commented on the vocals and guitarwork. It has since been viewed as a benchmark for the second wave of emo.

== Background and split single ==
Jimmy Eat World released their self-titled debut studio album through local label Wooden Blue Records in December 1994. As the members left high school, frontman Jim Adkins worked for a production company with Joel Leibow, co-founder of Wooden Blue. The company listed itself in Maximum Rocknroll's guide Book Your Own Fuckin' Life, which assisted bands, promoters, and venues to book shows across the United States. Christie Front Drive were planned to support Sense Field in Los Angeles, California and sought to cobble a touring schedule with Book Your Own Fuckin' Life, contacting Adkins and Leibow's company for a gig in Phoenix, Arizona. Following that gig, Leibow asked if they wished to do a split seven-inch record with Jimmy Eat World for Wooden Blue. Frontman Eric Richter was not aware of that band, and was not fond of their pop-punk style after hearing their debut album, but agreed to it. Loren Israel, who had been elevated to a talent scout role at Capitol Records after being an unpaid intern of three years, was annoyed at losing Beck to Geffen Records, and sought to sign other new artists.

Israel went to the Sense Field show to check out that band; however, Christie Front Drive, caught his attention. Liking their performance, Israel approached them and was promptly given Richter's phone number. Upon arriving in their home state of Colorado, Richter found a cassette tape Adkins had sent him with a newly composed song on it, "Digits". The track was a departure from pop-punk into a new sound Jimmy Eat World were experimenting with; drummer Zach Lind said the music of Christie Front Drive was a direct influence on the sonic shift. Richter, who was living with his parents, was told that he had gotten a call from Capitol Records and had a message from Israel. After various calls with Israel and fellow Capitol staff member Craig Aaronson, where Richter said he was not interested, he eventually told Israel about the upcoming split with Jimmy Eat World. The Jimmy Eat World and Christie Front Drive split was issued on Wooden Blue Records in 1995. Adkins and Wooden Blue co-founder Jeremy Yocum got an apartment together as the former was attending his first year at Northern Arizona University in Flagstaff, Arizona. During one day that Adkins was not in, Yocum answered a call from Aaronson, who was looking for Adkins.

Yocum told Aaronson that Jimmy Eat World was playing at The Nile Theater in Mesa, Arizona the following week, and while he wrote information down from Aaronson, he had forgotten to tell Adkins about it when the latter returned hours later. Aaronson went to the Nile show and after its conclusion, approached the members of Jimmy Eat World, telling them that he had been frequently listening to the split. Up to now, two other major labels had contacted the band and asked for a tape of their music prior to the interest from Capitol. The following day, Aaronson and the band met up; guitarist Tom Linton understood his love of music, though him and Adkins were apprehensive about the situation. The members had been conscious of a feature in Maximum Rocknroll titled "Some of Your Friends Are Already Fucked", where Adkins said they learned about "the horror stories of getting screwed [over by labels]." After swapping details, they got frequent phone calls from Aaronson and Israel over the following weeks, the latter of which was not aware of any other label interest in the band. At this stage, Jimmy Eat World lacked a lawyer and a manager; they could not afford a touring manager as they did not have enough funds. Despite this, they were accompanied by roadie Paul Drake, who they were introduced to through Christie Front Drive. Drake said that while Aaronson appeared to be a good person, he was still a standard A&R yes-man.

== Capitol Records signing ==
Up to 1995, Capitol Records had a prosperous 1990s, having celebrated its 50th anniversary in 1992, the addition of Gary Gersh as the label's new president in 1993 and the mining of its back catalog thanks to past artists such as Nat King Cole and Frank Sinatra. By 1995, Israel felt that the label had to find another potentially big, new artist. He explained that after Capitol's previous success with MC Hammer at the start of the decade, money was slowly depleting. Israel said the number of alternative rock bands that shifted units were a small amount compared to the butt rock and pop genres: "Sure, Green Day sold a lot, but how many Green Days were there?" Though Israel was not aware of the type of artists the other scouts were eyeing up, he himself sought a group that could composed radio-appropriate hit songs and were magazine cover-friendly. The other staff at Capitol were not in-tune with current music, and on the occasion that they were, he saw that "it was more collegiate." Israel thought Jimmy Eat World, despite the rough edge of their earlier releases, had writing potential and physical attractiveness that Capitol might be able to grow and sell. Despite his enthusiasm, Israel's co-workers did not care for the band. Journalist Dan Ozzi, in his book Sellout: The Major-Label Feeding Frenzy That Swept Punk, Emo, and Hardcore 1994–2007 (2021), wrote Jimmy Eat World resembled Boy Scouts that did not have the aggressive characteristic of Nirvana, nor the power-chord knack of Green Day. Aaronson was the only one of Israel's colleagues that wanted to help him.

Around this time, Gersh became Aaronson's mentor, the two having met previously at Geffen Records when the latter was operating out of the mailroom. Aaronson wanted to work in the Capitol A&R offices, with Gersh relenting after constant asking. With trust in Israel's judgement, Aaronson went to Gersh about signing Jimmy Eat World. According to Lind, Gersh had told Aaronson not to pursue them. On visits to Los Angeles, Aaronson and Israel looked after the members of Jimmy Eat World, providing them with lodging. The band were shown around the Capitol Records' offices and over the next few months, they struck up a strong rapport with Aaronson and Israel, viewing them as actual individuals instead of Maximum Rockandroll-envisaged corporate businessmen. The pair told the band what Capitol Records as able to provide them: a proper producer, time in the studio and a solid budget for recording. Adkins said the choices were either Capitol or keep issuing releases on his roommate's label, realising that Wooden Blue Records could not be an acceptable operation any further. Gersh yielded his position and agreed to have Aaronson offer a development deal to start with, which allowed Capitol Records to have a claim to Jimmy Eat World. They were given a small stack of papers to sign; though they had no manager to look at the papers, the members promptly brought it up to their parents. As the band did not know any entertainment lawyers, they hired Lind's family attorney to gloss over the contract.

According to Adkins, the attorney "kept saying, 'I'm not an entertainment lawyer, but here's what I think it says.'" A few of their parents were worried that having an uncertain music career meant giving up on education, eventually conceding that the members could always enroll the following year. As a result, Adkins shifted his full attention to Jimmy Eat World, dropping out of college. An issue arose around bassist Mitch Porter and his family: as he was raised to be a Mormon, and when he turned 19, he was expected to embark on a mission call. Porter, who had been keeping the knowledge of the deal from his parents, quit the band. Bassist Rich Burch, who had previously turned down Jimmy Eat World as he was busy with his band Carrier, joined. He avoided college in order to play with them, acknowledging that they were about to sign with a major record label. In mid-1995, Jimmy Eat World formally signed a development deal that included one album, with the possibility for six more. They received a smaller sum for the deal than similar bands Green Day and Jawbreaker had. As such, the members of Jimmy Eat World retained their jobs, such as at an art supply store and temp agency, in order to cover rent. The label did purchase a $20,000 pre-owned Ford econoline van for the band, which allowed them to tour without the threat of breaking down, giving them an advantage over their contemporaries. Capitol set up the band to record demos for their next album with Jon Auer of the Posies in Seattle, Washington. They then visited Aaronson at his house in Los Angeles, where they showed him the demos they had done. Aaronson was discussing the band's songwriting process, which he felt made no sense; Adkins explained they used to write songs as a series of interesting parts one after another.

== Recording and production ==
As Aaronson and Israel wanted to schedule recording time for Jimmy Eat World, excited to see what they would create, they asked the members if there was anyone in mind they wished to work with. Adkins immediately thought of Mark Trombino, former drummer for Drive Like Jehu, one of his favorite artists. Drive Like Jehu had issued their own major label album the year before with Yank Crime (1994). Lind said Adkins played them Drive Like Jehu before; the members of Jimmy Eat World also enjoyed other acts Trominbo had worked with, such as Boys Life and Boilermaker. Aaronson then set them up with Trombino at Big Fish Studios, located in Encinitas, California. The band and Trombino spent two days here, where they quickly struck up a good rapport with one another. They recorded two songs together, "Opener" and "77 Satellites", both of which were released through independent label An Industry for Outer Space on seven-inch vinyl. Knowing the session was fruitful, Capitol Records green lit an album, expected to be recorded later in the year. Jimmy Eat World wanted Trombino for their new album; however, Trombino had limited experience as a producer, and had not handled an album that was commercially viable.

Aaronson felt his superiors would not gel with Trombino's lack of credentials, and decided to bring in Wes Kidd to fill the producer's role. Kidd fronted recent labelmates Triple Fast Action, who Capitol saw as a more important investment than Jimmy Eat World. To satiate members of the latter, Trombino was added to collaborate with Kidd. Lind said Kidd's involvement was solely to keep their label happy and to bring in a more competent songwriter. At the label's insistence, Jimmy Eat World went to a rehearsal room in Los Angeles, having been told to write some new songs and rewrite others, being guided by Kidd. Capitol initially wanted the production duo of Tom Rothrock and Rob Schnapf, who had previously produced for the likes of the Foo Fighters and Beck, to helm the album. The label eventually relented, with the band, Trombino and Kidd all receiving a producer credit. The band did pre-production at Mind's Eye Digital in Mesa, with engineer Larry Elyea. Static Prevails was recorded at Sound City in Los Angeles, and at Big Fish. with sessions being split across two periods, in August and December 1995, to accommodate the members who stayed in college to finish their semesters.

In contrast to how Jimmy Eat World recorded their debut album – made in two days together in one room – the members were shown how to do multitrack recording, and given weeks to toy with the technology. Drums were recorded over a week at Sound City. Billy Bowers and Jeff Sheehan served as assistant engineers at Sound City. When Jimmy Eat World recorded Seventeen", it initially featured the chorus line "You're only seventeen"; however, when they realized it sounded too similar to a song by Winger, Linton changed the lyrics, and the band re-recorded it. A segment of their recording budget was used to have Richter flown out to Los Angeles to record a vocal part for a re-recorded version of "Digits". Trombino, who also acted as engineer, mixed all of the tracks, apart from "Rockstar" and "Seventeen", in Studio C at Capitol Studios. Peter Doell, Billy Smith, and Steve Genewick worked as assistant engineers at Capitol. Rothrock and Schnapf mixed "Rockstar" and "Seventeen" at Sunset Sound, with Cappy Japngie serving as an assistant engineer. Captiol Records insisted on Rothrock and Schnapf mixing the tracks because the label planned to send them to alternative radio stations; subsequently, the vocals on both tracks ended up high in the mix. Stephen Marcussen mastered all of the recordings at Precision Mastering, while Aaronson served as the executive producer.

== Composition and lyrics ==
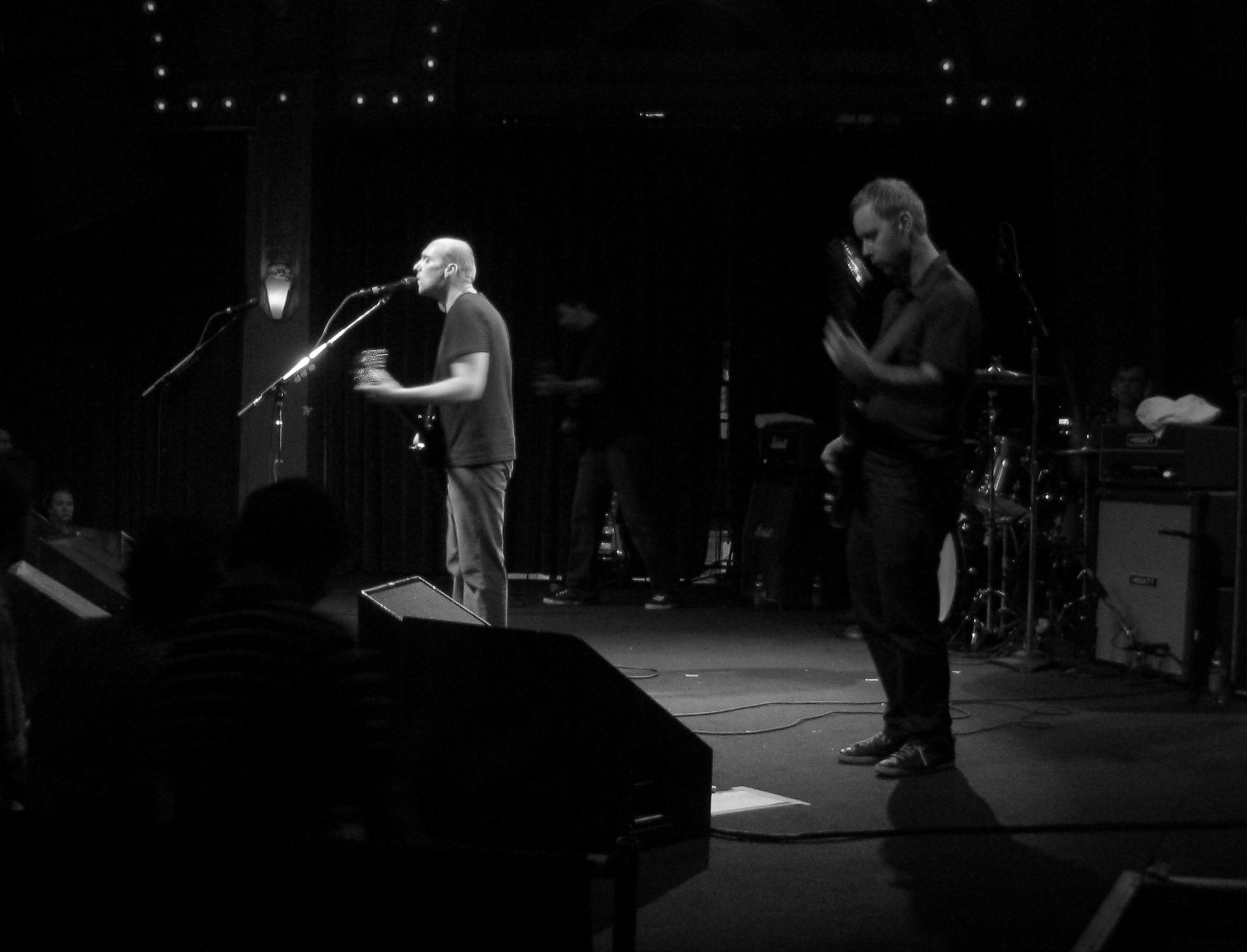
Sunny Day Real Estate served as one of the overall influences on Static Prevails, with "In Circles" (1994) directly inspiring Jimmy Eat World's "Claire".

=== Overview ===
Static Prevails marked a shift from Jimmy Eat World's previous skate punk material in the vein of NOFX, Rocket from the Crypt, and J Church, into aggressive but melodic post-hardcore, emo, and punk rock, taking inspiration from mid-tempo rock artists such as Low, Seam, Sunny Day Real Estate, and Tortoise. Ozzi said Jimmy Eat World musically sat between the type of band they wanted to be and the kind of band their label expected of them. Lind attributed this change in style to listening to Christie Front Drive, who they found to be highly melodic while remaining impactful. He said he played in a more aggressive and noisier style of rock-oriented drumming, with elements of his punk roots. Static Prevails splits lead vocals evenly between Linton and Adkins, which contrasted from the Linton-dominated Jimmy Eat World, where Adkins only sung lead on one track.

Trombino was baffled at first by the vocal change, as he considered Linton their main vocalist and Adkins an occasional singer, to the point where he asked why Linton was not providing more vocal parts. Ted Simons of Phoenix New Times compared Adkins' vocals to those of the Replacements' frontman Paul Westerberg. Ozzi remarked that where Adkins had previously crammed a lot of lyrics into fast-paced punk rock verses, for the new songs, he spread out the words and let them "occupy the space the band created for themselves." In addition to playing the drums, Lind played the accordion and the concertina. Tracks such as "Seventeen", "Digits" and "Robot Factory" are reminiscent of releases on indie labels like Homestead and Twin/Tone Records. Richter provided additional vocals on "Digits", while Kidd played an acoustic guitar on "Claire", Lind's ex-girlfriend Sarah Pont played violin, and Trombino contributed on the Moog synthesizer.

=== Songs ===
The opening track, "Thinking, That's All", and "Call It in the Air" are screamo-esque songs, the former channeling the sound of Unwound. Linton said Adkins came up with the basic form of "Thinking, That's All", which the other members added to. The band had been playing "Rockstar" live for sometime, prior to signing with Capitol, with Linton often mumbling his speech as he had no lyrics for it. It was only during the demo session with Auer that he wrote the words, as the label thought it was a hit-sounding song. "Claire" evokes Texas Is the Reason with its quiet and loud sections, aided by a violin. Lind considered the song to be important for the band, as it showed them that a simplistic arrangement could make a song interesting. Linton said they took influence for it from Sunny Day Real Estate, specifically their song "In Circles" (1994), while Adkins said the lyrics were akin to a journal entry. "Call It in the Air", with its punk-esque sound, earned a comparison to Sense Field. Lind said it exemplified the band's punk roots. Lind said the opening drum part to "Seventeen" intentionally ripped off Drive Like Jehu, to the annoyance of Trombino. "Episode IV" is the first track the band wrote without any "loud, saturated guitar sounds", according to Adkins. He came up with the basic structure, which he showed to Linton, who thought it had a sound akin to "Hurt" (1994) by Nine Inch Nails. Linton opted to whisper his vocals instead of singing to "keep it a really delicate song".

"Digits" was influenced by the work of Christie Front Drive; an earlier version of it was released on Jimmy Eat World's split with Christie Front Drive. For the album's version, new sections were added to the song, increasing its length by a further three minutes. "Caveman" features the sound of crickets throughout its length, which was achieved by taking a Neumann U67 microphone outside Big Fish Studios. For sometime, Linton struggled with the song's lyrics; he only came up with them while in the bathroom at the studio "looking at aerosol cans and trying to find some rhythming words to match the verse". The band used to open their shows with "World Is Static" as it would shift direction partway through. Alongside this, Adkins said they were employing choruses more often as they found enjoyment in repetition. The drums in it were inspired by John Anderson, the drummer of Boys Life. Staff members at Capitol asked Linton to tell Adkins to stop screaming as he was doing it for the majority of "World Is Static": "I was like, 'Yeah, I can't tell him that, because he'll just scream louder'". Burch compared the hushed atmosphere of "In the Same Room" to falling snow. When mixing the song, Adkins said him and Trombino recorded radio static for its beginning, which Trombino compressed to make it sit around the vocals. The title of "Robot Factory" comes from a power plant in the McClintock area of Tempe, Arizona. The closing track, "Anderson Mesa", features a string arrangement; its title references the observatory of the same name. Adkins said it was about him living in Flagstaff, in particular, his previous college apartment during its closing lyrics.

== Release and conflict with Capitol Records ==
After Jimmy Eat World handed in Static Prevails, the staff at Capitol were disappointed. "Just guys being like, 'Uh ... this is a lot different than what we expected'", according to Linton. Jimmy Eat World toured the West Coast of the US in anticipation of the album between May and July 1996, supporting Crumb for half of this period. Capitol Records released Static Prevails on July 23, 1996. The cover artwork features a sideways photo of chimneys, shot on a rooftop in Denver, Colorado, which was taken by Drake. The original vinyl LP version featured different artwork, and included the bonus seven-inch vinyl of "In the Same Room" and "77 Satellites". The discourse with the concept of selling out had reached the mainstream by the time of Static Prevails' release; the band had relatively few fans during this period that Burch said they were "so young that there wasn't anything to sell." Ozzi said the music scene in Arizona was receptive to Jimmy Eat World's desire to get bigger, unlike the scene in Berkeley, California, which was hostile towards its bands that had joined major labels. Backlash towards the band instead came from when "Seventeen" was used on a promotional CD for the Surge brand of drinks, created by The Coca-Cola Company.

While their local community was supportive of Jimmy Eat World, they soon learned that Capitol Records was unsure of how to handle the band. Adkins said that major labels knew what to do with artists that shifted thousands of albums per week, such as Green Day and Jawbreaker, yet were stumped on what to do with Jimmy Eat World, whose collective sales racked up 2,000 copies across all their releases. As Static Prevails lacked an obvious single-sounding song, radio support for the album was dropped. It struggled to receive feature stories and reviews from press outlets and magazines. The band appeared too insignificant for press outlets to care about them, while important punk zines disregarded anything that was issued on a major label. Despite this, Israel drafted up reviews that were then sent to zines, such as Maximum Rocknroll. He said writers for these types of publications were talking about bands like Jawbox, Knapsack, and Texas Is the Reason, all of whom he felt lacked the better vocals that Adkins and Linton offer and were unable to write hooks like Jimmy Eat World. Aaronson and Israel were met with indifference at the label's offices, with Gersh not willing to support an act that was relatively unknown.

The band made a music video for "Rockstar", which was included on some copies of the CD version of the album as enhanced content. It was filmed at Koo's Cafe, a DIY venue in Santa Ana, California, with directing brother and sister duo Richard and Stefanie Reines, both founders of Drive-Thru Records and friends of Jimmy Eat World. A friend of the siblings was interested in funding said music video; it was estimated to cost $5–10,000, with him initially wanting to pay half. When Israel brought this up to Gersh during a meeting, an argument ensured with Gersh declining the proposal. It was eventually made without support from Capitol. Marketing ideas from the label were met with resistance from Jimmy Eat World. During one meeting, Capitol's marketing department suggested having them perform outside 7-Elevens all over the country, which was promptly turned down. Leibow began an internship at Capitol during this time and directly saw how the label was fine with allowing Static Prevails get buried under other releases from the year, such as Electriclarryland by the Butthole Surfers, which he was told to promote instead. Capitol Records released "Call It in the Air" as the lead single from Static Prevails on August 26, 1996, on a seven-inch vinyl record, with "Rockstar" as the B-side.

Despite the issues with Capitol Records, Jimmy Eat World proceeded as they previously had, with Lind booking their future touring treks. The band promoted the album with a mini-US tour along the West Coast; later, they embarked on the God Bless America tour with labelmates the Smoking Popes and the Figgs from September 1996. Following a supporting show for the Voodoo Glow Skulls in October 1996, Jimmy Eat World they played a few West Coast shows the following month. In February 1997, Jimmy Eat World embarked on a cross-country US tour with Sense Field. The members of Jimmy Eat World frequented record stores, where they were unable to locate copies of Static Prevails. When in the New York City offices of the label, Adkins tried to find any sign of their album, only to be asked by an employee if he had gotten lost, presuming Adkins to be a student that disappeared while on a tour of the facility. Adkins had discussions with Richter, where he was disappointed with being on Capitol and debated doing something else with his life. Jimmy Eat World were making headway while grinding out on tour, alongside their contemporaries in Braid, Jejune and Mineral. Capitol felt the original version of "Seventeen" would work in the film Never Been Kissed (1999), and in return for letting them use it in the movie, the band members met Drew Barrymore. Adkins felt the lyrics of the original tied in well with the lead character of the movie.

== Reception and aftermath ==
Professional ratings
Review scores
Source	Rating
AllMusic	3/5 stars
The New Rolling Stone Album Guide	2/5 stars
RTÉ	3/5 stars

Static Prevails was met with mixed reviews from music critics on its songwriting. Gavin Report's David Beran highlighted the guitarwork on the album, and remarked that Jimmy Eat World "still have a lot of world to eat; they're on the right track." AllMusic reviewer Mike DaRonco stated that the maturity of later Jimmy Eat World material was fundamentally absent from Static Prevails; "but it's almost as if the studio heads at Capitol wouldn't let them [mature] so that there would be more room for radio-friendly pop songs. In the end, nobody won." Harry Guerin of RTÉ found the release to be a mainly typical emo album that rarely kept his attention throughout its duration. According to him, it had a high number of similar-sounding guitar riffs and "overwrought vocals [...] to be convincing". Journalist Chris Ryan, writing in The New Rolling Stone Album Guide (2004), called it a product of the time period it was made in, complete with "anxiety-ridden vocals, lyrics of suburban melodrama, and screaming punk guitars". He conceded that Jimmy Eat World "knew a hook heard it head one", highlighting "Call It in the Air". BBC Music writer Tim Nelson opened his review asking if the album title was intended to be read as ironic, as "staying still is one thing this propulsive pop album [...] doesn't do." In his eyes, the music passed the line dividing "indie indulgence and soul-sucking corporate pap with aplomb". Barbara Restaino of Lollipop Magazine thought she would enjoy the album to begin with, however, Adkins and Linton's voices became an annoyance to her after a while.

In the first year of Static Prevails' release, the album had sold less than 10,000 copies, making it a commercial failure. The Nettwerk America label re-released Static Prevails and Jimmy Eat World's third studio album Clarity (1999) in June 2001. Both albums were then reissued in 2007; "77 Satellites" and "What Would I Say to You Now" were included as bonus tracks on this iteration of Static Prevails. Static Prevails, along with Clarity and their fifth studio Futures (2004), was re-pressed on vinyl in 2014. In 2007, Michael Carriere of The Shepherd Express viewed Static Prevails and Clarity as landmarks in the second wave of emo. In 2012, Jason Heller of The A.V. Club noted that like with similar punk artists that joined major labels, Jimmy Eat World lost of a lot older fans and earned a minuscule amount of new ones with Static Prevails. Coinciding with the album's 25th anniversary, Bandbox and Captiol Records released a version of the album with an accompanying booklet written by Alex Rice. He highlighted five songs from the band's catalogue – "Believe in What You Want" from Clarity, "Bleed American" from their fourth studio album Bleed American (2001), "Futures" from Futures (2004), "Action Needs an Audience" from their seventh studio album Invented (2010), and "Pol Roger" from their ninth studio album Integrity Blues (2016) – that drew influence from Static Prevails. Louder writer Alistair Lawrence said songs like "Claire" and "Digits" made "something uneven but distinct, which would unintentionally form part of the roadmap for emo's rite of passage through the late '90s". Andrew Sacher of BrooklynVegan felt that "Claire" was the oldest instance of the band reaching with artistic intentions, which was further on Clarity.

== Track listing ==
All songs written by Jimmy Eat World. All recordings produced by Wes Kidd, Mark Trombino, and Jimmy Eat World.

Static Prevails track listing
No.	Title	Lead vocals	Length
1.	"Thinking, That's All"	Jim Adkins; Tom Linton	2:52
2.	"Rockstar"	Linton	3:47
3.	"Claire"	Adkins	3:40
4.	"Call It in the Air"	Adkins; Linton	3:00
5.	"Seventeen"	Linton	3:33
6.	"Episode IV"	Linton	4:28
7.	"Digits"	Adkins	7:29
8.	"Caveman"	Linton	4:34
9.	"World Is Static"	Adkins	3:56
10.	"In the Same Room"	Adkins	4:57
11.	"Robot Factory"	Linton	3:58
12.	"Anderson Mesa"	Adkins	5:14
Total length:			51:28

== Personnel ==
Personnel per booklet.

Jimmy Eat World

- Tom Linton – guitar, vocals
- Jim Adkins – guitar, vocals
- Zach Lind – drums, accordion, concertina
- Rick Burch – bass guitar

Additional musicians

- Eric Richter – additional vocals (track 7)
- Sarah Pont – violin
- Mark Trombino – Moog
- Wes Kidd – acoustic guitar (track 3)

Design

- Paul Drake – cover photography, ambient band photo
- Andy Mueller – smiley band photo
- Jim Adkins – other photos
- Ohiogirlco – design, art direction

Production

- Wes Kidd – producer
- Mark Trombino – producer, engineer, mixing (all except tracks 2 and 5)
- Jimmy Eat World – producer
- Tom Rothrock – mixing (tracks 2 and 5)
- Rob Schnapf – mixing (tracks 2 and 5)
- Billy Bowers – assistant engineer
- Jeff Sheehan – assistant engineer
- Peter Doell – assistant engineer
- Billy Smith – assistant engineer
- Steve Genewick – assistant engineer
- Cappy Japngie – assistant engineer
- Larry Elyea – engineer
- Stephen Marcussen – mastering
- Craig Aaronson – executive producer
