= Bleed American =

2001 studio album by Jimmy Eat World

Studio album by Jimmy Eat World
- Released: July 24, 2001
- Recorded: October–November 2000
- Studios: Cherokee (Los Angeles); Harddrive (North Hollywood, California
- Genres: Alternative rock; emo pop; pop-punk; power pop
- Length: 46:38
- Label: DreamWorks
- Producers: Mark Trombino; Jimmy Eat World

Jimmy Eat World chronology
| Singles (2000) | Bleed American (2001) | Futures (2004) |

Singles from Bleed American
- 1. "Bleed American" Released: June 5, 2001; 2. "The Middle" Released: October 2001; 3. "Sweetness" Released: June 3, 2002

Bleed American is the fourth studio album by the American rock band Jimmy Eat World, released on July 24, 2001, by DreamWorks Records. The album was re-released as Jimmy Eat World following the September 11 attacks; that name remained until 2008, when it was re-released with its original title restored.

Following the commercial failure and lack of recognition for their third album Clarity (1999) from Capitol Records, Jimmy Eat World were dropped by the label in late 1999. Aside from working odd jobs, the band toured to raise money for their next album. It was recorded with Mark Trombino and the band served as producers in October and November 2000 at the Cherokee and Harddrive studios in Los Angeles, respectively. The musical style was more direct and accessible than its predecessor, with simpler chord structures.

"Bleed American" was released to radio on June 5, 2001, as the album's lead single, coinciding with Jimmy Eat World's tours of Australia and Japan (the latter supporting Eastern Youth). After appearing on the East Coast dates of the Warped Tour, the band supported Blink-182 and Weezer. "The Middle" was released as a single in October 2001. The band went on a headlining European tour in early 2002, followed by a Japanese tour, leading up to a two-month support slot for Blink-182 and Green Day on their Pop Disaster Tour. "Sweetness" was released as the third single on June 3, 2002. The band supported Incubus in Australia, before embarking on headlining tours of the UK and the US. "A Praise Chorus" was released as a promotional single during 2002.

Each single from Bleed American entered the top twenty of at least one US chart. The most successful was "The Middle", which reached number one on the Billboard Modern Rock Tracks chart and number five on the Billboard Hot 100. In July 2026, Bleed American was certified double platinum by the Recording Industry Association of America (RIAA) after its sales reached over two million units. As of June 2026, the album has sold over 1.7 million copies in the US. Bleed American was well-received by critics and appeared on several publications' best-of-the-year album lists, by the likes of CMJ New Music Report and Q, as well as all-time lists by publications such as Consequence of Sound, NME and Spin.

== Background ==
In February 1999, Jimmy Eat World released their third album, Clarity, through Capitol Records. Frontman Jim Adkins recalled that the label was disorganized at the time, having a new president and new people in charge of each department. As a result, any trust the band had within the company had dissipated. Capitol began to shelve the album until radio stations started playing the song "Lucky Denver Mint", which became its second track. The release of the album marked the end of their two-record deal with the label, which was made official in August 1999. Drummer Zach Lind recalled that the label "really didn't believe in us. But in a way, that was sort of a good thing, because it let us take control of what we needed to do. We learned we had to do it ourselves, because no one else would do it for us."

Amid a lack of funds, the members had taken up odd jobs: Adkins sold art supplies; Tom Linton did construction work; Rick Burch sold auto parts; and Lind worked at a car dealership. In August 2000, Jimmy Eat World released the compilation album Singles through the independent label Big Wheel Recreation, which included B-sides and unreleased songs from the band up to that point. They went on a five-week tour of Europe, and bought copies of their previous releases from Capitol at cost value to sell them directly in that territory. The band's management were against the idea of this tour as they lacked a foothold in the United States. They decided to break away with their management to work as free agents. The tour was ultimately considered a success by the band, with Clarity selling 500 copies a week by that point. After this, they released a split EP with Jebediah in September 2000.

== Recording ==
Bleed American was produced by Mark Trombino and Jimmy Eat World. Trombino had already produced two of the band's previous albums: Static Prevails (1996) and Clarity (1999). He had struck up a brotherly relationship with the band; he reacted positively to the demos that Adkins had played him. The sales from Singles and the proceeds from Jimmy Eat World's European tour helped fund the album's recording sessions, but the money budgeted for the record was insufficient. Trombino offered to work for free until after the album's production, confident he would be reimbursed by the album's predicted commercial success. Recording sessions took place in Los Angeles, California in October 2000. Clark Robertson, who had been in a band that Linton saw live, rented equipment on the band's behalf.

The drums were recorded at Cherokee Studios in Los Angeles, which proved costly to the group. The band took a brief break to tour with Jebediah for two and a half weeks, including a performance at CMJ's New Music Marathon festival, before returning to Los Angeles. To save money, sessions moved to Harddrive in North Hollywood, where they did overdubs over the course of a month and a half from November 2000. Partway through, at the suggestion of Trombino, the band uploaded demo versions of songs on the music platform Napster for fans to hear. By this point, artists and repertoire (A&R) people from various labels visited the band, often unannounced. As a result of this, they had to lock the doors to keep people out. The album was mixed at South Ecstasy Recording Studio, also in Los Angeles, in January 2001. As Lind was writing a check to cover the cost of mixing, he was worried they were close to bankruptcy, and hoped it would not bounce.

== Lyrical themes and musical style ==
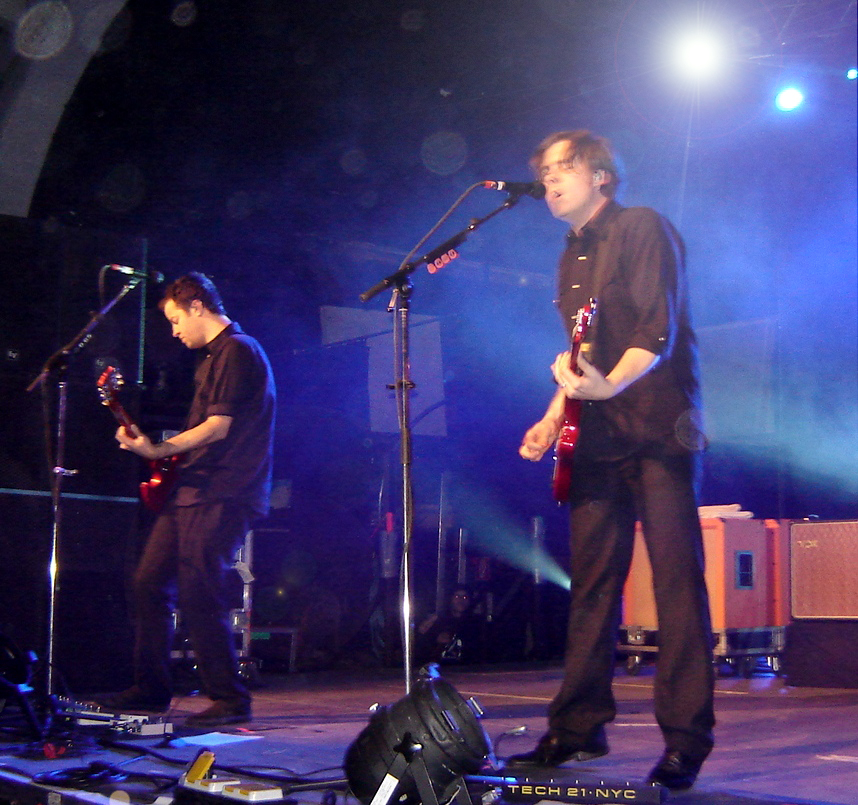
Tom Linton (left) and Jim Adkins (right) were the main composers of Bleed American.

=== Overview ===
The material on Bleed American was more accessible and aggressive than its predecessor Clarity, which had a more "layered, sprawling sound." In regard to the stylistic approach of the album, Adkins said, "Things still got pretty gnarly in the studio as far as experimentation, but it was always to an end that was complimentary [sic] to the song. We wanted to really make sure that we weren't doing things, like, just to put a wacky keyboard sound in. It had to be doing something constructive for the song." They intentionally strayed away from the complex writing of Clarity for simpler structures. "Hear You Me" and "My Sundown" were initially intended for Go Big Casino, Adkins's orchestral side project. Critics have described the genres of the album as alternative rock, emo pop, pop-punk and power pop. Additionally, Loudwire stated that the album represented scene music. According to Adkins, the band called the album Bleed American as it and the title track dealt with "chang[ing] one's life for the better", and as such that theme "runs throughout the entire album". He also stated that people "all too often get caught up with things they don't really need. America just needs to be a strong bloodletting process".

The lyrical composition in Bleed American also remained rather direct and straightforward in comparison to Clarity. Mark Vanderhoff of AllMusic said that Bleed American didn't have any "16 minute songs", referencing "Goodbye Sky Harbor" from Clarity. Rather, he called the music on Bleed American "just straight-ahead rock & roll, performed with punk energy and alt-rock smarts." Author Andy Greenwald said the album dealt with self-medication, "more specifically the Jim Adkins Diet—where music, any music, equals salvation". He noted that the majority of the songs on the album are sung from a second-person perspective. Towards the end of touring in support of Clarity, Adkins began having what he thought was a heart attack. It was later revealed to be a panic attack, for which he had to take medication; the incident inspired some of the lyrics throughout the album. Rachel Haden (of That Dog) lent her voice in "Hear You Me", "If You Don't, Don't", "Cautioners" and "My Sundown".

=== Songs ===
"The Middle"
According to Under the Radar, "The Middle" is considered to the band's signature song and their crossover hit, becoming "one of the most recognizable tunes of its generation, a common radio staple to this day".

Adkins said "Bleed American" is about how trivial things in a person's life can overtake more important things. The grunge-esque track has been compared to the work of Helmet, At the Drive-In and Braid. Journalist Alex Rice felt that its loud-quiet structure and lyrics about the disillusionment of youth recalled "Thinking, That's All", the opening track from Static Prevails. When writing "A Praise Chorus", the band were stuck on the bridge section; they sent it to Davey von Bohlen (of the Promise Ring) who wrote a bridge referencing various songs, including "Crimson and Clover" by Tommy James and the Shondells, "Our House" by Madness, "Kickstart My Heart" by Mötley Crüe and "Don't Let's Start" by They Might Be Giants. Throughout "A Praise Chorus", which deals with nostalgia, Adkins employs a vocal stutter. The new wave-esque "The Middle" includes a guitar solo that, according to Adkins, was a homage to Doug Gillard of Guided by Voices and their song "I Am a Tree". Its lyrics speak about "fitting in" and self-acceptance; Adkins wrote the song in response to an email from a fan who felt they were "not punk enough". Lind said his drums on the song were an attempt to emulate the ones heard in "You Wreck Me" by Tom Petty.

"Your House" details the pain of a break-up, cutting all communication with the person, and is reminiscent of the work of Versus. The drum parts were played in unison by Lind, Adkins and Trombino, as Lind wanted something similar to a marching band. "Sweetness" was one of the songs that Adkins had more doubts about because of its lyrical content: "I just had this melody in my head and I was demoing it and singing it and kind of having a hard time with it. I almost didn't bring it to the band because I was thinking to myself, 'I can't just say nothing. I can't just use all these sort of alyrical whoahs for this much of a song.'" The whoah vocalizations were intended as a placeholder for other lyrics, though as the members were unable to come up with anything else, the parts remained. The drum beat was done in the style of U2 drummer Larry Mullen Jr.; it incorporates influences from post-hardcore and second-wave emo. A demo version of the tune was recorded during the Clarity sessions, though Capitol Records did not think much of the track, so the band scrapped it.

"Hear You Me" is a tribute to Mykel and Carli Allan, two popular Weezer fans, who died in a car accident while returning home after a concert. The guitarwork uses a countermelody against the vocals; it includes a piano, organ, horns and Haden's vocals. "If You Don't, Don't" tackles the theme of lost love; the guitars were initially much faster in the style of the Wedding Present, until Adkins slowed it down. "Get It Faster" opens with a minute of drum fills, which were programmed in the PlayStation game MTV Music Generator. "Cautioners" is a five-minute electropop song that meshes electronica and rock. It channels the sound of the Cars and recalls the quieter songs on Clarity. An earlier version of the track, released on a split EP with Jebediah, was centered around guitar strums. The version on the album features heavy use of decay, which Adkins said sounded "computerized". The drums were made up of several loops that were made at Cherokee, done over the course of a few days. The title and lyrics of "The Authority Song" are a direct reference to "Authority Song" by John Cougar Mellencamp, and it also contains a reference to Automatic, an album by the Jesus and Mary Chain. It deals with being half-open with a person one is not too familiar with. The album concludes with the ballad "My Sundown".

== Release ==
Following their departure from Capitol, Jimmy Eat World continued to build a grassroots following through extensive touring and independent promotion. As work progressed on what would become Bleed American, early demos began circulating informally, including through file-sharing platforms such as Napster. The songs generated significant interest within the music industry, aided by word-of-mouth and the band's growing reputation. Informal showcases held by the band attracted label representatives, leading to increased attention and a competitive environment among major labels. During this period, DreamWorks Records' A&R executive Luke Wood monitored the band's potential from when they became free agents and offered to help them. Wood had previously been in the band Sammy, who opened for Jimmy Eat World during the 1990s, and was adamant about signing them after hearing "A Praise Chorus". Jimmy Eat World considered Wood's help, but it was not until a year later when they returned to contact him.

By this stage, the band had enlisted a new booking agent and secured management under John Silva, whose team included Gary Gersh, the former president of Capitol Records. Despite these new representatives, Lind continued acting as the band's de facto manager, a role he had been doing for two years by that point. With professional representation in place, the band entered formal discussions in Los Angeles and New York City in March 2001 with several labels, including Hollywood Records, Drive-Thru Records (and later its parent, MCA Records), Sire Records, Atlantic Records, and RCA Records. The renewed interest extended to Capitol itself, though negotiations did not progress after the band requested the return of their master recordings and release from prior financial obligations. The level of industry competition was described by participants as a bidding war, with numerous labels seeking to sign the band as their new material gained wider recognition. Ultimately, Jimmy Eat World signed with DreamWorks Records in April, which offered a multi-album deal reportedly valued in the seven-figure range. Lind said the label had a solid working relationship with their artists, "[t]hey understand what a career is, like how fragile it is." The agreement included provisions for independent promotion, tour support, and guaranteed music video funding.

On May 21, 2001, Bleed American was announced for release later in the year. It was made available for streaming on July 19, 2001, before being released five days later. The album artwork, showing a set of bowling trophies sitting on top of a cigarette machine, is taken from William Eggleston's photograph "Memphis". Adkins was a fan of Eggleston, going as far as to dub him the "father of color photography". Out of concern that its title could be misinterpreted following the September 11 attacks, the album was re-released with an eponymous title in December 2001, despite the band initially saying that they would not change its name. The decision was ultimately the band's, which was supported by their label; instead of recalling existing copies, they simply had the name amended with subsequent pressings of the album. In addition, the title track was renamed "Salt Sweat Sugar" and reissued on December 11, 2001.

=== Singles and EPs ===
"Bleed American" was released to radio on June 5, 2001, and released as a physical single on August 21, 2001. The US 7-inch vinyl version includes a demo of "Your House", while the German CD edition features demos of "Your House" and "The Authority Song", alongside "(Splash) Turn Twist" and the music video for "Bleed American" (directed by Ross Richardson).

"The Middle" was released as a single in October 2001. The UK 7-inch vinyl includes a radio session version of "A Praise Chorus" as its B-side, while the European CD features "No Sensitivity" and demos of "The Middle" and "My Sundown". Another CD version, which saw release in Europe and the US, features radio sessions versions of "If You Don't, Don't", and a Guided by Voices cover of "Game of Pricks", as well as the music video for "The Middle". The video was directed by Paul Fedor, who based it on The Brady Bunch episode "The Driver's Seat". The video features the band at a party performing in a living room to a crowd of people in their underwear. The protagonist, played by Josh Keleher, arrives at the party fully clothed; he eventually undresses in a closet, encountering a girl undressing as well, but after seeing each other they decide to leave the party together rather than undress.

"Sweetness" was released as a single on June 3, 2002; the UK 7-inch vinyl version includes a live version of "Clarity" as its B-side. Two CD versions were released in Europe: the first with live versions of "Blister" and "Your New Aesthetic", while the other include live versions of "If You Don't, Don't", "Lucky Denver Mint" and "Blister". The music video for "Sweetness" shows the band stationary as the world is altered around them; it was filmed in Los Angeles, with director Tim Hope. Lind said the video was "loosely based on a general journey of what a band goes through as they start and as they progress". "A Praise Chorus" was released as a promotional single in 2002.

In addition to the album's singles, two EPs were released to support Bleed American. The first of these EPs, titled Good to Go EP, was released on February 22, 2002, exclusively in Japan, and features "Spangle", "The Most Beautiful Things", an acoustic version of "The Middle", a radio session version of "Game of Pricks", an early version of "Cautioners" and live versions of "A Praise Chorus" and "Softer". The second EP, titled The Middle/A Praise Chorus Tour EP, was a tour EP released in Australia in January 2003, consisting of "The Middle", "A Praise Chorus", "Firestarter", an acoustic version of "The Middle" and a live version of "Bleed American".

=== Subsequent events and releases ===
Bleed American was initially released on vinyl through Grand Royal Records; when that label folded, it was re-pressed through Adkins's own label Western Tread in 2003. In October 2003, the band released the Believe in What You Want video album, which chronicled the making-of and release of Bleed American. On April 28, 2008, a deluxe edition of the album was released with a bonus disc containing several B-sides, acoustic versions, live versions, demo versions and previously unreleased tracks. The original album and track title Bleed American were restored for this release. This edition was pressed on vinyl in 2011 as part of Record Store Day. Later that year, the band performed Bleed American and Clarity in their entireties for two UK shows.

== Touring ==
Following two one-off US shows in February 2001, Jimmy Eat World embarked on a two-week tour in Germany. In June, the band went on a tour of Australia and Japan, the latter being a supporting slot for Eastern Youth. After they made their second appearance on the Warped Tour, where they played the East Coast shows in July and August 2001, they supported Blink-182 and Weezer. The band then appeared on The Late Late Show with Craig Kilborn (around which, the band played three shows in Los Angeles) and the Late Show with David Letterman, and performed at Edgefest II in Canada. They supported Weezer on their Extended Midget Tour in the US to close out the year; Jimmy Eat World were augmented by touring musicians Brian McMahan (of the For Carnation) on sampler, keyboards and guitar and Haden on backing vocals. Alongside this, the band performed on Late Night with Conan O'Brien. In January and February 2002, the band were due to support Blink-182 on their tour of Europe; however, when that band postponed, Jimmy Eat World embarked on a headlining European tour instead.

After returning to the US, Jimmy Eat World played four shows in the southern states, before traveling to Japan, where they played until March 2002. The band supported Blink-182 and Green Day on their co-headlining US Pop Disaster Tour in April and May 2002, which coincided with appearances on Saturday Night Live and The Tonight Show with Jay Leno. Following this, Jimmy Eat World supported Incubus on their headlining tour of Australia, before going on their own tour of the UK with support from the Promise Ring, and playing a series of US festivals and Canadian shows. Preceded by an appearance on the Late Show with David Letterman, they embarked on a headlining US tour, with support from Desaparecidos, Recover and the Promise Ring. Following this, the band performed at the Reading and Leeds Festivals in the UK. In September and October, the band performed at This Ain't No Picnic festival and on two dates of the Plea for Peace/Take Action Tour, in addition to an appearance on Last Call with Carson Daly.

== Reception ==
=== Original reviews ===
Original release
Review scores
| Source | Rating |
|---|---|
| AllMusic | 5/5 stars |
| Blender | 3/5 stars |
| Entertainment Weekly | B |
| Los Angeles Times | 2.5/4 stars |
| NME | 8/10 |
| Pitchfork | 3.5/10 |
| Rolling Stone | 3.5/5 stars |
| Slant Magazine | 3.5/5 stars |
| USA Today | 3.5/4 stars |
| The Village Voice | C+ |

Bleed American was met with generally favorable reviews from music critics. Several reviewers discussed the album's emo stylings. While noting that those who dislike "emo or 'poppier' music" would dislike the album, Aubin Paul of Punknews.org said that "the punker-than-thou kids should stick with Static Prevails, but a catalog as impressive as J.E.W.'s can be appreciated by anyone without preconceptions." Rolling Stone reviewer Barry Walters added to this, stating that it "sports the tender turbulence that insular emo kids have been enjoying in private for years", with the album appealing to fans of pop-punk band Blink-182, post-grunge band Creed, and even new wave music. The staff at Entertainment Weekly observed the album as a "fine balancing act" of "emo-edged" tracks and "wallop-packed rockers", though Joe Warminsky III of The Morning Call disregarded the emo elements, describing it instead as a genuine rock record.

Multiple reviewers, including those at AllMusic, Drowned in Sound, and USA Today, praised the songwriting quality and guitarwork; these included remarks on "catchy melodies", "bouncy rhythms" and "a tacklebox of hooks". NME writer Imran Ahmed said it was a "veritable pop-buzzsaw, rammed to its back teeth with infectious melodies and teen TV sentiment". Paul stated that unlike the band's prior albums, the second half of Bleed American was "quite strong, and really fleshes out the musical ideas from the record". Greenwald said in comparison to Clarity, which "goes inward in search of salvation", Bleed American was "outgoing, boisterous, confident". Blender, on the other hand, was less pleased as the album's mainstream potential was "undercut by guitars, which are neither as gleefully blaring as Weezer's nor as cleanly melodic as the Knack's."

Other reviewers were mixed on the album's mature stance. Steve Hochman of the Los Angeles Times commented that listeners "graduating from teen tastes could well turn to this album as a first step to adulthood", while Robert Christgau of The Village Voice stated "if this band can't be maturity's answer to 'N Sync, it can be patriotism's answer to Travis." Aaron Scott of Slant Magazine believed the maturity the band showed through the album was capable of attracting a wide-ranging audience. Pitchfork's Ryan Schreiber gave a much more negative and sarcastic review of the album, concluding, "So do the best you can, listen to your favorite band, bury your head in the sand, before it all begins again. Hey, I just wrote a Jimmy Eat World song!"

=== Retrospective reviews ===
Retrospective reviews
Review scores
| Source | Rating |
|---|---|
| AbsolutePunk | 97% |
| PopMatters | 6/10 stars |
| Punknews.org | 3.5/5 stars |
| Sputnikmusic | 3.5/5 |
| Tiny Mix Tapes | 3/5 stars |

Retrospective reviews of Bleed American continued to praise the album's songwriting quality. Thomas Nassiff of AbsolutePunk opined that the album contained "no bad songs", concluding: "Certainly one of the most memorable records of 2001, Bleed American might actually have the most lasting power of any album from that class." Mike Stagno of Sputnikmusic found Bleed American enjoyable, and noted its high replay value, particularly tracks such as "Sweetness" and "Get It Faster".

Louder Than War writer Sam Lambeth saw the album as a "hallmark of modern rock, a faultless record that may wear its heart on its sleeve, but elevates in its earnestness". Punknews.org staff member Brian Shultz reviewed the deluxe edition, and found the album's content to still be strong despite its age. On the other hand, PopMatters's Charles A. Hohman found "little insight or revelation [on the deluxe edition]." A guest writer for Tiny Mix Tapes said the album's strongest points were the "stripped down" tracks.

== Commercial performance ==
Bleed American was a commercial success, helping Jimmy Eat World gain mainstream popularity. It sold 30,000 copies in its first week of release. It peaked at number 54 on the Billboard 200 on August 11, 2001; the renamed version peaked at number 31 in July 2002. Outside the US, the album peaked at number 20 in Germany, number 43 in New Zealand, number 54 in Australia, and number 62 on the UK Albums Chart.

Bleed American became a bestseller; in its first four months on the US market, it sold 173,000 copies, making the album Jimmy Eat World's most successful release. Lind said that these sales were "definitely a big deal to the band because it shows how the fanbase is growing. [If you're] doing anything creative, you want more and more people to enjoy what you do." In July 2026, it was certified double platinum in the US by the Recording Industry Association of America (RIAA). Alongside this, the album was certified platinum in Canada by the Music Canada (MC) and New Zealand by Recorded Music NZ (RMNZ), and gold by the British Phonographic Industry (BPI) in the UK. As of June 2026, Bleed American has sold over 1.7 million copies in the US.

"The Middle" reached number five on the US Billboard Hot 100. It also charted at number one on the Modern Rock Tracks chart, number two on the Adult Top 40, number four on Mainstream Top 40, number 39 on the Mainstream Rock Tracks chart, and number 44 on the Rock Digital Songs chart. Outside the US, it charted at number 26 on the UK singles chart, where it was certified double platinum, number 28 in New Zealand, number 29 in Scotland, number 49 in Australia, number 92 in the Netherlands, and number 98 in France.

"Bleed American" peaked at number 16 on the Modern Rock Tracks chart. It also charted at number 59 in Scotland and number 60 in the UK. "Sweetness" peaked at number 75 on the Billboard Hot 100, and number two on the Modern Rock Tracks chart, and number 40 on the Adult Top 40. Outside the US, it charted at number 31 in Scotland and number 38 in the UK. "A Praise Chorus" peaked at number 16 on the Modern Rock Tracks chart. "Hear You Me" was certified silver in the UK in 2024.

== Accolades and legacy ==
Greenwald said Bleed American being certified platinum was one factor in emo reaching mainstream media attention in mid-2002, alongside Vagrant Records having significant sales figures on its releases and Dashboard Confessional appearing on MTV Unplugged. In addition, Jimmy Eat World became the first emo act to have significant success at radio and on the charts. Greenwald mentioned that with Bleed American being their "poppiest, most universal album to date", the band "broke out of the indie/emo ghetto, but by doing so, they also defined its sound 'as' emo for hundreds of thousands of new listeners". My Chemical Romance worked with Trombino for a test session for Three Cheers for Sweet Revenge (2004) as the members loved Bleed American. Five of the album's songs were covered by Australian acts for the tribute album Sing It Back: A Tribute to Jimmy Eat World (2015).

Q listed Bleed American as one of the best 50 albums of 2001, while Consequence of Sound ranked it at number nine on their list of the top 10 albums of the year, and CMJ New Music Report included it on their unnumbered list. The album was included in Rock Sound's 101 Modern Classics list at number 48. In 2013, it was ranked at number 429 on NME's The 500 Greatest Albums of All Time list. The publication also listed the album as one of "20 Pop Punk Albums Which Will Make You Nostalgic", as well as one of "20 Emo Albums That Have Resolutely Stood The Test Of Time". The album was ranked at number 183 on Spin's "The 300 Best Albums of the Past 30 Years (1985–2014)" list. In 2017, Rolling Stone ranked it at number 25 on their list of the 50 Greatest Pop-Punk Albums.

Accolades for Bleed American
| Publication | List | Rank | Ref. |
|---|---|---|---|
| Consequence of Sound | Top 100 Albums of the 2000s | 70 | |
| Junkee | The 10 Most Important Emo Albums | N/A | |
| Spin | The 300 Best Albums of the Past 30 Years | 183 | |

== Track listing ==
All songs written by Jimmy Eat World, except "A Praise Chorus", which contains lyrics from various songs. (Note: Lyrics from "Crimson and Clover" (Thomas Gregory Jackson, Peter P. Lucia, Jr.), "Our House" (Chris Foreman, Cathal Smyth), "Why Did Ever We Meet" and "All of My Everythings" (The Promise Ring), "Rock 'n' Roll Fantasy" (Paul Rodgers), "Don't Let's Start" (John Flansburgh, John Linnell) and "Kickstart My Heart" (Nikki Sixx) appear in the bridge of "A Praise Chorus".)

Bleed American track listing
| No. | Title | Length |
|---|---|---|
| 1. | "Bleed American" (listed as "Salt Sweat Sugar" on the self-titled version) | 3:02 |
| 2. | "A Praise Chorus" | 4:03 |
| 3. | "The Middle" | 2:46 |
| 4. | "Your House" | 4:46 |
| 5. | "Sweetness" | 3:40 |
| 6. | "Hear You Me" | 4:45 |
| 7. | "If You Don't, Don't" | 4:33 |
| 8. | "Get It Faster" | 4:22 |
| 9. | "Cautioners" | 5:21 |
| 10. | "The Authority Song" | 3:38 |
| 11. | "My Sundown" | 5:40 |

Bonus tracks

Japanese/vinyl bonus track
| No. | Title | Length |
|---|---|---|
| 12. | "(Splash) Turn Twist" | 4:09 |

Deluxe edition disc one
| No. | Title | Length |
|---|---|---|
| 12. | "The Most Beautiful Things" (from Good to Go / Jebediah split) | 3:51 |
| 13. | "No Sensitivity" (from German "The Middle" single / Jebediah split) | 3:41 |
| 14. | "(Splash) Turn Twist" (from The Middle EP / Firestarter EP) | 4:10 |

Deluxe edition disc two
| No. | Title | Writer(s) | Length |
|---|---|---|---|
| 1. | "Cautioners" (demo, from Good to Go EP / Jebediah split) | | 3:49 |
| 2. | "Firestarter" (The Prodigy cover, originally from The Fat of the Land) | Kim Deal, Anne Dudley, Keith Flint, Liam Howlett, Trevor Horn, J.J. Jeczalik, Gary Langan, and Paul Morley | 6:24 |
| 3. | "Get It Faster" (AOL version, previously unreleased) | | 3:44 |
| 4. | "Bleed American" (live, from the A Praise Chorus EP) | | 3:02 |
| 5. | "A Praise Chorus" (live, from Good to Go) | | 3:53 |
| 6. | "Softer" (live, from Good to Go) | | 4:14 |
| 7. | "The Middle" (acoustic, from the A Praise Chorus EP) | | 3:10 |
| 8. | "If You Don't, Don't" (XFM version, from British "The Middle" single) | | 4:45 |
| 9. | "Game of Pricks" (Guided by Voices cover, from British "The Middle" single / Good to Go EP) | Robert Pollard | 1:55 |
| 10. | "The Authority Song" (demo, from German "The Middle" single) | | 3:10 |
| 11. | "My Sundown" (from Believe in What You Want) | | 5:23 |
| 12. | "Sweetness" (live, previously unreleased) | | 4:05 |
| 13. | "Last Christmas" (Wham! cover, from Christmas EP) | George Michael | 4:27 |
| 14. | "My Sundown" (demo, from German "The Middle" single) | | 3:08 |
| 15. | "Spangle" (The Wedding Present cover, from Good to Go EP / Singles) | David Gedge, Simon Smith, Paul Dorrington and Darren Belk | 4:36 |
| 16. | "Hear You Me" (from Believe in What You Want) | | 4:48 |
| 17. | "The Middle" (demo, from German "The Middle" single) | | 2:48 |
| 18. | "Your House 2007" (previously unreleased) | | 4:00 |

== Personnel ==
Personnel per 2008 reissue booklet.

Jimmy Eat World

- Jim Adkins – lead vocals, guitar; percussion (all except 8); bass guitar (track 4); piano (tracks 6 and 11); organ (tracks 9 and 11), bells (track 11)
- Rick Burch – bass guitar (all except 4); backing vocals (track 7)
- Zach Lind – drums; percussion (tracks 4 and 11)
- Tom Linton – guitar (all except 3); backing vocals (track 1); organ (track 6)

Additional musicians

- Davey von Bohlen – additional vocals (track 2)
- Mark Trombino – synth emulator programming (track 3); percussion (track 4); programming (tracks 8 and 11); "magic box" (track 9)
- Travis Keller, Doug Messenger – "timely handclaps" (track 10)
- Rachel Haden – additional vocals (tracks 6, 7, 9 and 11); uncredited back-up vocals (track 10)
- Ariel Rechtshaid – additional vocals (track 7)

Production

- Mark Trombino – producer, engineer, mixing
- Jimmy Eat World – producer
- Justin Smith – assistant engineer
- William Eggleston – front cover photograph
- Christopher Wray-McCann – photography
- Jim Adkins – art direction
- Jeff Kleinsmith – art direction, design
- Jesse LeDoux – design

Deluxe edition production

- Dana G. Smart – supervisor
- Jimmy Eat World, Dana Smart, Luke Wood – compilers
- Pat Lawrence – executive producer
- Ted Jensen – mastering
- Vartan – art direction
- Coco Shinomiya – design
- Ryan Null – photo coordination
- Monique McGuffin Newman – production manager

== Charts ==
=== Weekly charts ===
Weekly chart performance for Bleed American
| Chart (2001–02) | Peak position |
|---|---|
| Australian Albums (ARIA) | 54 |
| Canadian Albums (Billboard) | 35 |
| German Albums (Offizielle Top 100) | 20 |
| New Zealand Albums (RMNZ) | 43 |
| UK Albums (Official Charts) | 62 |
| US Billboard 200 | 31 |

=== Year-end charts ===
Year-end chart performance for Bleed American
| Chart (2002) | Position |
|---|---|
| Canadian Albums (Nielsen SoundScan) | 105 |
| Canadian Alternative Albums (Nielsen SoundScan) | 32 |

== Certifications ==
Certifications for Bleed American
| Region | Certification | Certified units/sales |
|---|---|---|
| Canada (Music Canada) | Platinum | 100,000^{^} |
| New Zealand (RMNZ) | Platinum | 15,000^{‡} |
| United Kingdom (BPI) for Jimmy Eat World | Gold | 100,000^{*} |
| United States (RIAA) | 2× Platinum | 2,000,000^{‡} |
^{*} Sales figures based on certification alone.^{^} Shipments figures based on certification alone.^{‡} Sales+streaming figures based on certification alone.

== See also ==
- List of entertainment affected by the September 11 attacks
