= Bleed American (song) =

2001 single by Jimmy Eat World

Single by Jimmy Eat World

from the album Bleed American
- Released: June 6, 2001
- Genre: Punk rock
- Length: 3:01
- Label: DreamWorks
- Songwriters: Jim Adkins; Rick Burch; Zach Lind; Tom Linton
- Producers: Mark Trombino; Jimmy Eat World

Jimmy Eat World singles chronology
"Blister" (1999)	"Bleed American" (2001)	"The Middle" (2001)

Alternative cover
- Cover for the UK single, retitled "Salt Sweat Sugar"

"Bleed American" is a song by American rock band Jimmy Eat World. It was released in June 2001 as the lead single from their fourth album, Bleed American (retitled Jimmy Eat World). Similar to the name change of the album after the September 11 attacks, the song was retitled "Salt Sweat Sugar" after the first line in the song's chorus.

== Music video ==
The music video features the band playing a live gig, filmed from various angles onstage.

== Track listings ==
UK CD

1. "Salt Sweat Sugar" (retitled album version)
2. "(Splash) Turn, Twist" (non-album)
3. "Your House" (demo rock version)
4. "Salt Sweat Sugar" (video)

UK 7-inch single

1. "Salt Sweat Sugar" (retitled album version)
2. "Your House" (demo rock version)

== Personnel ==
Personnel are adapted from the Bleed American album booklet.

Jimmy Eat World

- Jim Adkins – lead vocals, lead guitar, percussion, production
- Tom Linton – rhythm guitar, backing vocals, production
- Rick Burch – bass guitar, production
- Zach Lind – drums, production

Production

- Mark Trombino – production, engineering, mixing
- Justin Smith – assistant engineering

== Charts ==
=== Weekly charts ===
Chart (2001)	Peak position
Scotland Singles (Official Charts)	59
UK Singles (Official Charts)	60
US Alternative Airplay (Billboard)	18

=== Year-end charts ===
Chart (2001)	Position
US Modern Rock Tracks (Billboard)	70

== Certifications ==
Region	Certification	Certified units/sales
United Kingdom (BPI)	Silver	200,000^{‡}
United States (RIAA)	Gold	500,000^{‡}
^{‡} Sales+streaming figures based on certification alone.

== Release history ==
Region	Date	Format(s)	Label(s)	Ref.
United States	June 5, 2001	Mainstream rock; active rock; alternative radio	DreamWorks	
United Kingdom	November 5, 2001	7-inch vinyl; CD; cassette	DreamWorks	
