= Jimmy Eat World =

American rock band

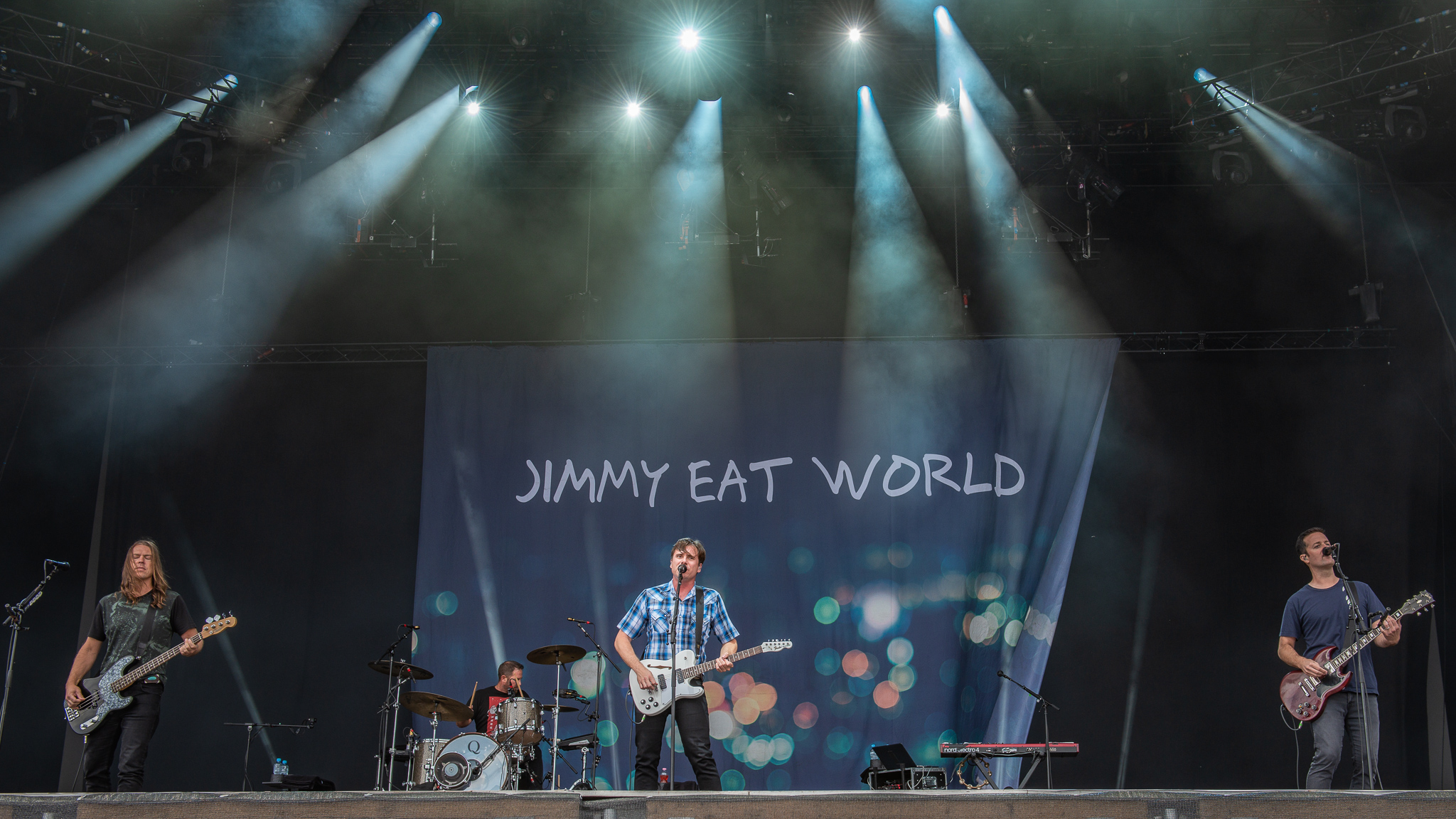
- Jimmy Eat World at Rock im Park 2018; Left to right: Rick Burch, Zach Lind, Jim Adkins, Tom Linton

Background information
- Origin: Mesa, Arizona, U.S.
- Genres: Alternative rock; emo pop; pop-punk; power pop
- Works: Discography
- Years active: 1993–present
- Labels: Wooden Blue; Capitol; Fueled by Ramen; DreamWorks; Better Looking; Interscope; Western Tread; Geffen; DGC; RCA; Dine Alone
- Members: Jim Adkins; Zach Lind; Tom Linton; Rick Burch
- Past members: Mitchel Porter
- Website: jimmyeatworld.com

Jimmy Eat World is an American rock band formed in Mesa, Arizona, in 1993. The band is composed of vocalist and lead guitarist Jim Adkins, rhythm guitarist and vocalist Tom Linton, bassist Rick Burch, and drummer Zach Lind. They have released ten studio albums, all but the first featuring the current line-up.

The four-piece's commercial breakthrough came with the release of several singles from their album Bleed American (2001), four of which charted within the top 20 positions of the Alternative Songs chart, with "The Middle" reaching No. 1. Their follow-up album, Futures (2004), featured their No. 1 song "Pain".

The RIAA certified Bleed American platinum and Futures gold which sold over 1.5 million between them. The band's sixth LP, Chase This Light (2007), became their highest-charting album and peaked at No. 5 on the Billboard 200. The band released their tenth album, Surviving, in October 2019.

== History ==
=== 1993–1994: Formation, Jimmy Eat World, and name ===
Jimmy Eat World formed in 1993 in Mesa, Arizona. Front man Jim Adkins and drummer Zach Lind, who had been friends since preschool, joined guitarist Tom Linton and bassist Mitchel Porter to try their hand at music. They originally formed with a punk rock sound and first released a demo tape in 1993, followed by a debut EP titled One, Two, Three, Four in 1994. Their debut self-titled album (1994) was released with Linton singing most of the lead vocals on the album. Within the span of a couple of years, the band recorded and released three singles and a full-length album on local label Wooden Blue Records.

During their formative period the band claimed as influences such pop-punk bands as Mr. T Experience, Radon, and Horace Pinker.

The band's name came from a crayon drawing made after an incident between Linton's younger brothers, Jim and Ed Linton, who fought frequently. Jim usually won, but Ed sought revenge by drawing a picture of Jim shoving the Earth into his mouth; Ed captioned the picture "Jimmy eat world".

=== 1995–1997: Static Prevails ===
Eventually, spurred by bands such as Sunny Day Real Estate, the band began to experiment with slower tempos and more varied song structures. As they began writing songs and touring in the indie scene, the band encountered like-minded bands, such as Christie Front Drive, Sense Field, and Seven Storey Mountain, that were working on similar sounds.

With several records released and consistent touring, the band attracted the attention of Capitol Records. They signed to Capitol in mid-1995. Just prior to signing with the label, bass player Mitchel Porter was replaced by Linton's friend Rick Burch.

After a brief scouting for producers, the band joined up with Drive Like Jehu drummer Mark Trombino and Wes Kidd from Triple Fast Action to record its major-label debut Static Prevails that featured their first singles "Call It in the Air" and "Rockstar". In the ensuing years, the band's agreement with Capitol permitted the release of singles on independent labels, including split 7-inch singles with Christie Front Drive (Wooden Blue Records, 1995), Jejune (Big Wheel Recreation, 1997), Blueprint (Abridged Records, 1996), Sense Field, and Mineral.

=== 1998–1999: Clarity ===
Following the release of Static Prevails, Jimmy Eat World were dissatisfied with their business relationship with Capitol and wanted to leave the label. However, Capitol still wanted the band to record another album. From late-1998 to early-1999, the band recorded their third studio album Clarity at two studios: Sound City Studios (Van Nuys, California) and Clear Lake Audio (North Hollywood, California). The tracks were mixed at One on One Studios (Los Angeles) and Music Grinder Studios, and were mastered at Bernie Grundman Mastering (Hollywood). Both the band and Trombino produced the album, with the latter also responsible for the album's mixing duties. Clarity marks the start of Adkins' primary role as lead vocalist with Linton's focus on guitar work. Clarity was also released on vinyl through the now-defunct American independent record label Big Wheel Recreation.

The third album contained the single "Lucky Denver Mint" and a radio remix of the song was featured in the film Never Been Kissed. The album's closing song "Goodbye Sky Harbor" is based on the John Irving novel A Prayer for Owen Meany. Overlooked upon its release, Clarity has since amassed cult status and critical acclaim.

=== 2000–2003: Bleed American ===
The band decided to record its next album without the help of a label, supporting itself with touring and by compiling its previously released singles into Singles, which was released on indie label Big Wheel Recreation. The band also took on day jobs, saving as much as they could to spend on the sessions. They worked for a third time with Trombino, who agreed to defer payment until after the album's release in order to keep costs down. Some of the drum tracks were recorded at Cherokee, and then the band moved to Doug Messenger's Hard Drive Analog and Digital studios in North Hollywood, where five weeks of tracking completed the recording phase. Trombino then mixed the record at Extasy in Hollywood. Adkins saw the band's goal for the album as "writing and playing the most precise, simple pop rock possible".

The finished album was titled Bleed American. Joining with Gersh's new management company, GAS Entertainment, the band scouted for a new label. The band eventually signed with DreamWorks Records. The completed album was released in July 2001, which included a vinyl edition through the now-defunct Grand Royal label, founded by the Beastie Boys in 1993. The title track (named "Salt Sweat Sugar" in the UK) was the lead single. The album's second single, "The Middle", became the band's biggest single to date, reaching number 5 on the Billboard Hot 100 chart. The video for the song received significant airplay on MTV, including on Total Request Live. The album was certified platinum by the RIAA. Following the September 11 attacks, the band decided to re-issue the album as Jimmy Eat World out of concern that the title Bleed American might be misinterpreted, possibly as a threatening "bleed, American". That year the band performed at Edgefest II in Toronto, Canada.

In 2008, the album was re-released as a deluxe edition and renamed to its original title, Bleed American. This edition contains a total of 32 tracks—the original 11 as well as 21 bonus tracks, which are live recordings, demos and B-sides.

=== 2004–2006: Futures ===
After lengthy touring in support of Bleed American, the band regrouped to work on the follow-up in early 2004. Once again, the band joined up with Trombino, but the collaboration was short lived. As the sessions began, the band decided that they did not have enough material for a cohesive album. The band's desire to spend more time writing songs conflicted with Trombino's availability, who already had other projects on his schedule.

Instead, the band brought in producer Gil Norton, well known for his work with the Pixies and the Foo Fighters. Lind explained in 2007, "After we left the studio with Trombino, we came up with 'Polaris', 'Work', 'Pain', [and] '23' – the songs that really gave Futures its heartbeat." Futures was released in October 2004, with "Pain" serving as the lead single.

In November 2003, Universal Music Group agreed to purchase DreamWorks Records from DreamWorks Pictures for roughly $100 million. The label was eventually shut down in January 2005. During 2004, various DreamWorks artists were reassigned to different labels at Universal, including Interscope Records, which is where Jimmy Eat World were assigned to.

In the months following the release of Futures, "Work" and the title track were released as singles. Having already toured the US alone and with Taking Back Sunday, the band signed on to tour in 2005 with Green Day. In September 2005, the band released the Stay on My Side Tonight EP, which contained reworked versions of demos recorded with producer Mark Trombino that were not used for the album. The album was eventually awarded Gold status in the US by the RIAA.

=== 2007–2008: Chase This Light ===
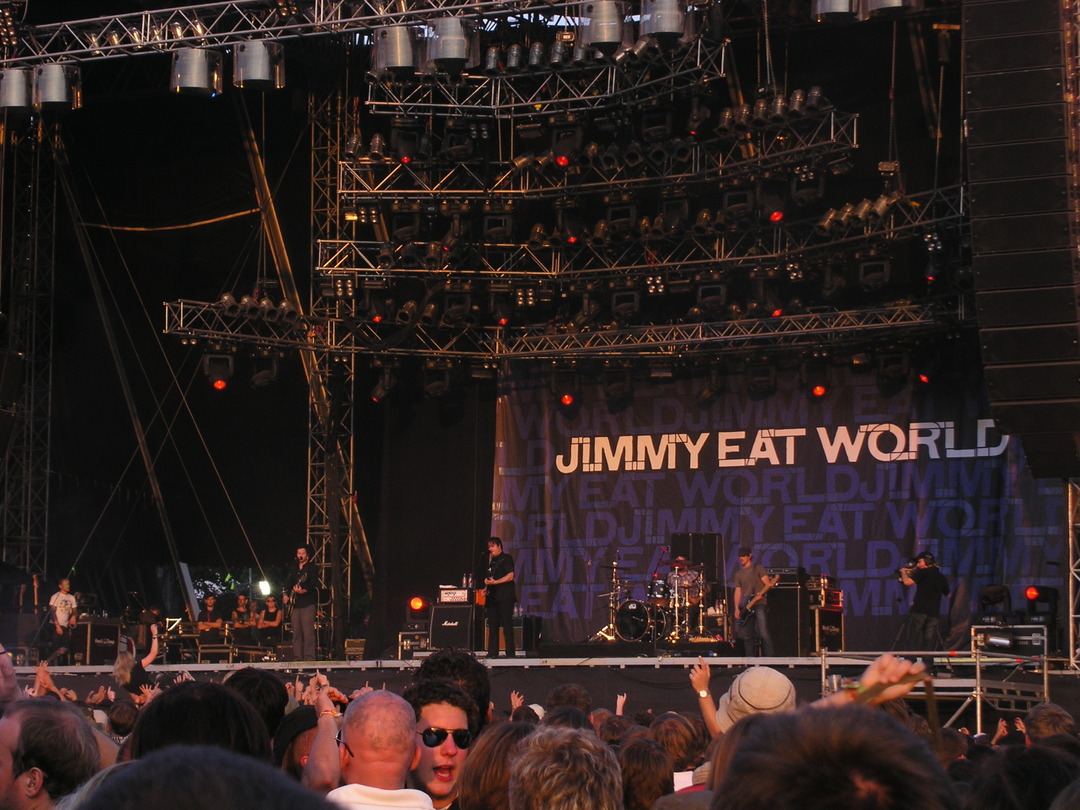
Jimmy Eat World performing in 2007

After its tour, Jimmy Eat World headed home to Tempe and started working on material for a sixth album. The band decided to self-produce the album, enlisting Chris Testa (Dixie Chicks) and John Fields (Switchfoot, Mandy Moore) as co-producers and Butch Vig (Nirvana, Garbage, The Smashing Pumpkins, Green Day) as executive producer. As Burch explained to the St. Petersburg Times, "[Vig's] role wasn't in the studio everyday. We would send Butch samples of what we were doing every couple of days." Chase This Light was released on October 16, 2007, with "Big Casino" as the lead single. "Always Be" was the last single off the album, released in December 2007.

=== 2009–2012: Invented ===
On June 13, 2008, the band revealed that they would begin work on their seventh album later that year and would also consider, upon the expiration of their contract with Interscope, self-releasing the record. Jimmy Eat World performed a tour in early 2009 to commemorate the tenth anniversary of Clarity, completing 10 stops across the US, performing the entire record on each occasion.

On March 22, 2010, the band stated that they were in the process of mixing the next album. The band also revealed that, for the first time since Clarity, the album would contain a song with lead vocals provided by original vocalist Linton. On June 7, 2010, Jimmy Eat World stated on Twitter: "Our new album is officially done. Now we wait for a release date. We'll keep you posted." Invented, the follow-up album after Chase This Light, was released on September 28, 2010, on Interscope Records, a date that was previously announced on July 14, 2010, in a Jimmy Eat World Twitter update.

=== 2013–2015: Damage ===
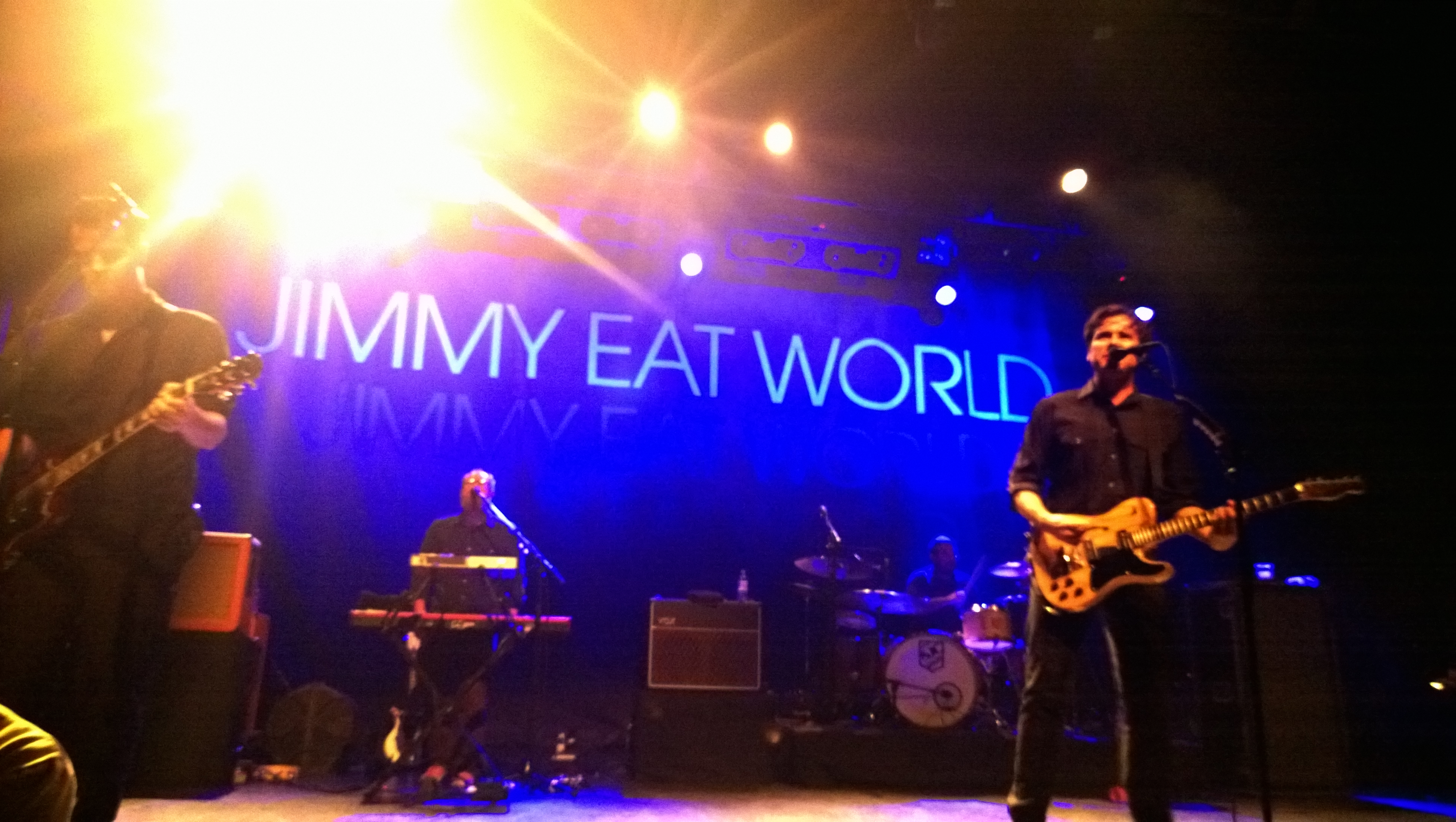
Jimmy Eat World performing in London, 2013

In October 2011, Adkins announced that the band would be writing and recording for their next album. Lind stated in a Twitter post that the band will begin recording its next album during the latter part of August 2012 and, on September 5, 2012, another Twitter post stated that recording had begun for the eighth studio album with engineer/producer Alain Johannes.

On October 5, 2012, Jimmy Eat World posted on Twitter that the band had completed recording its eighth album and that the recording was being mixed at that time; the mastering process then commenced after a November 30, 2012, Twitter update indicated that the mixing process had been completed. On January 29, 2013, Jimmy Eat World stated on both its Twitter and Facebook profiles that the eighth studio album was "officially mastered and sequenced". In a Twitter post on Lind's individual profile, the drummer revealed that, as of January 29, 2013, the band was still seeking out a record label for the release of the eighth album. Lind briefly responded to a fan's query with the following: "@CallumSty no announcement coming soon. still looking for a label."

The official details of the eighth album, entitled Damage, emerged in early April 2013 and on April 10, 2013, a lead single titled "I Will Steal You Back" was revealed via the band's website. The title track "Damage" appears on the 7-inch Damage EP along with a cover version of the Radiohead song "Stop Whispering". The EP was released on April 20, 2013, for Record Store Day, an internationally recognized celebration in support of music and independent retail outlets. Jimmy Eat World also released the album's track-listing, consisting of 10 songs, and June 11, 2013, as the official release date. Adkins explained in a Rolling Stone magazine interview that Damage is a "pretty energetic" work that explores the issue of relationship breakups from the perspective of an adult: "I'm 37 and the world around me is a lot different than when I was writing break-up songs in my 20s. I tried to reflect that in what the lyrics are."

The release of Damage also signifies the cessation of Jimmy Eat World's independent era, as the band signed a recording contract with the Toronto-based record label Dine Alone Records. RCA Records released the eighth album in the US on April 4, 2013 and internationally April 11, 2013. The album was recorded in Johannes' Los Angeles home and was mixed by James Brown, who had previously worked with Sound City, Nine Inch Nails, and The Pains of Being Pure at Heart.

The band posted a music video for the song "I Will Steal You Back" on their VEVO YouTube page on May 31, 2013. In October 2013, the band announced a series of December 2013 US tour dates that followed a UK/European tour.

=== 2016–2018: Integrity Blues ===
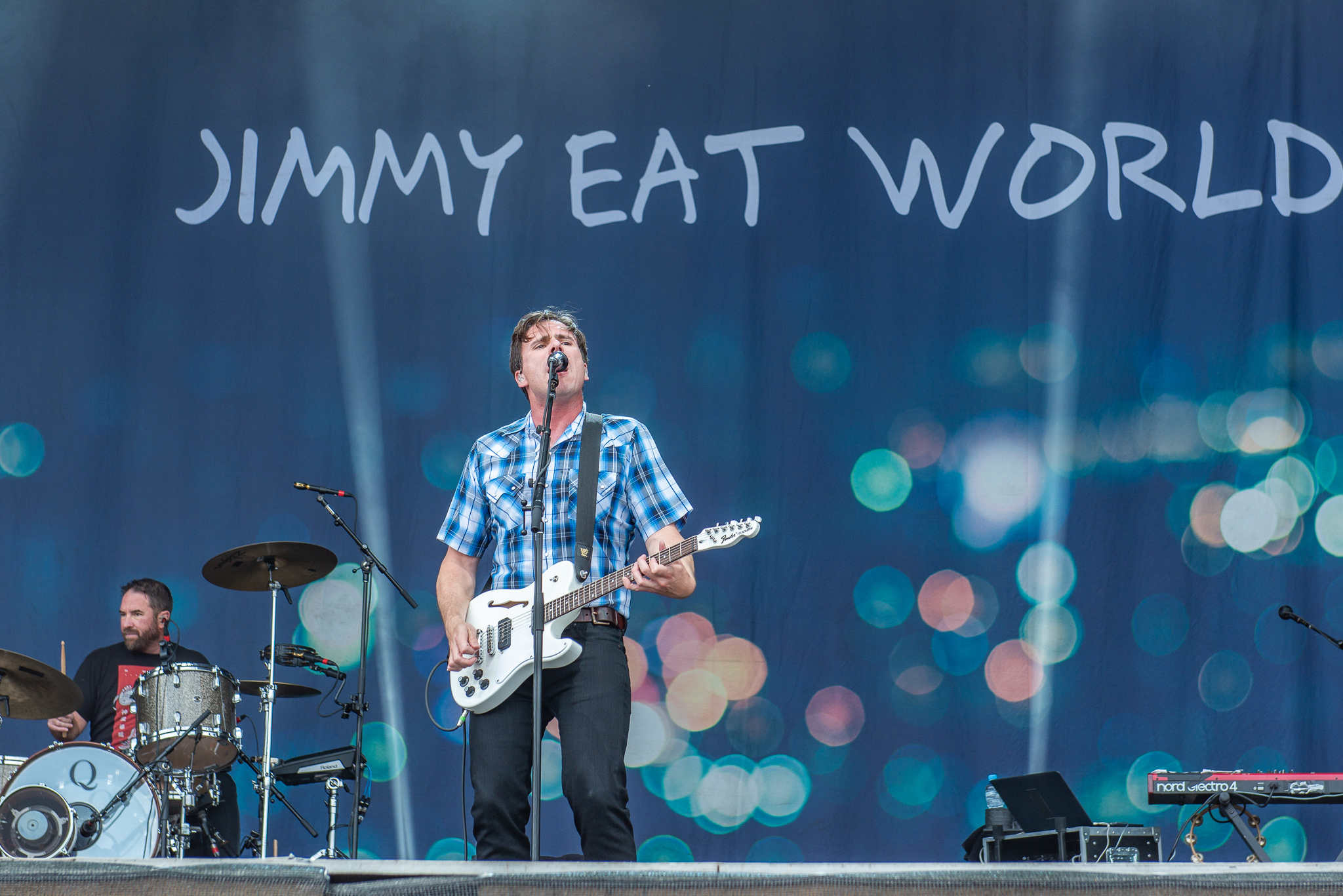
Jimmy Eat World at Rock im Park 2018

In mid-2014, the band announced the "Futures 10 Year Anniversary Tour" in commemoration of the 10-year anniversary of Futures. Vinyl reissues of Futures, Static Prevails, and Clarity were released prior to the commencement of the tour, which began in Ventura, California, US Prior to the Tempe, Arizona, stop of the tour at the end of October, Adkins confirmed that new material was being compiled by the band, but a release time frame was not available. An Oceania leg of the tour occurred in November 2014.

In April 2016, Apple debuted an ad to promote Apple Music which featured Taylor Swift lip syncing and dancing to Jimmy Eat World's "The Middle". This caused significant renewed interest in the band; their song "The Middle" rose to No. 32 on the iTunes Top Songs Chart, while Pandora noted a 325% increase in Jimmy Eat World station ads in the first day after the ad premiered.

On August 18, 2016, the band's Facebook page linked to a 14-second video of instrumental music to the image of a country road, with the words "Stay tuned ...", further hinting at an upcoming release of the band's ninth album. On August 21, 2016, the band released a new song titled "Get Right", available for free download from their official website. On August 30, 2016, the band debuted the single "Sure and Certain" on radio and announced a new album, Integrity Blues, which was released on October 21. The band planned to tour in 2018 as part of the "Integrity Blues Tour" with supporting acts The Hotelier and Microwave.

On May 4, 2018, the band released "Love Never" / "half heart", featuring two new songs.

On February 14, 2019, Jimmy Eat World played a surprise show at The Rebel Lounge in Phoenix, Arizona, to celebrate the 25th anniversary of their first show.

=== 2019–present: Surviving and Something(s) Loud ===
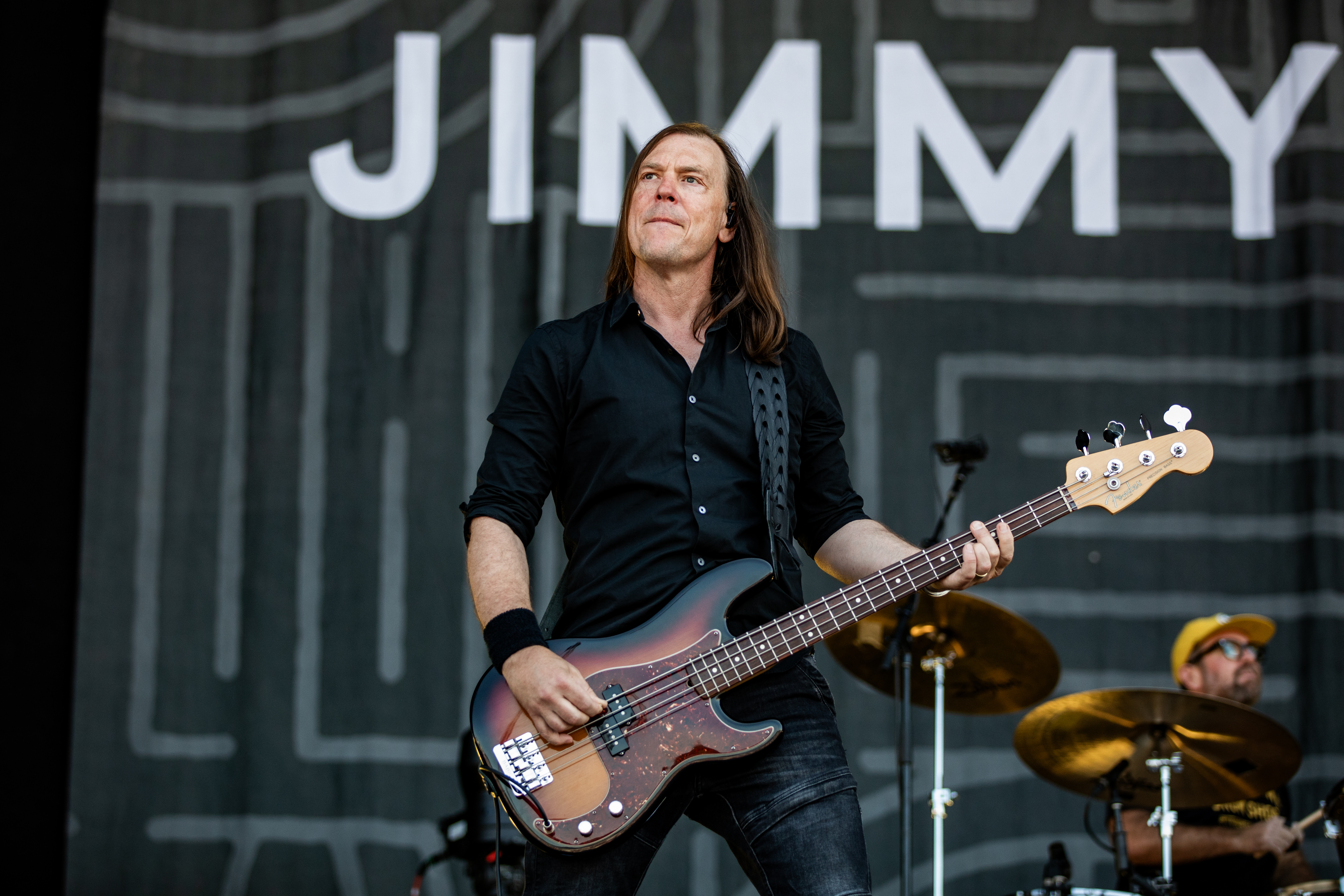
Rick Burch performing at Southside Festival 2025

On May 17, 2019, Jimmy Eat World announced the completion of their tenth studio album, planned for release in the fall. On September 18, 2019, Kerrang! magazine interviewed Jimmy Eat World about their new album, Surviving. It features 10 tracks including "Congratulations", "Surviving" and "Criminal Energy", as well as the previously released single "Love Never". The band released Surviving on October 18, 2019.

Because the band was unable to tour the following year due to the COVID-19 pandemic, much of their activity was put on hold. Adkins revealed that, during this time, he chose not to write new music, as he felt burnt out from very recently writing and recording Surviving, and wanted to take a break. After the pandemic, they focused their efforts on an online concert series called "Phoenix Sessions", in which they played multiple shows covering all of the songs on Surviving, Futures and Clarity. The band returned to playing live shows in 2021, first appearing at Lollapalooza 2021 in Chicago.

Adkins began writing new music once the band was able to play shows again, which he took inspiration from and the excitement that it brought the band, specifically the When We Were Young festival. In May 2022, the band announced a headlining North American tour named after their new single, "Something Loud", which released on June 10, 2022. The single was the band's first to be released independently, and Adkins remarked that this newfound freedom found the band wanting to "focus on less music, but hopefully more often". Non-album singles continued to release following "Something Loud", including "Place Your Debts" in October 2022.

On March 13, 2023, Jimmy Eat World announced a North American co-headline tour with Manchester Orchestra titled "The Amplified Echoes Tour", with Middle Kids serving as its opener. Ahead of this tour, both bands released covers of each other's songs as promotional singles; Jimmy Eat World covered "Telepath" from The Million Masks of God while Manchester Orchestra covered "Table for Glasses" from Clarity. That same month, the band toured in Australia in support of My Chemical Romance.

On November 3, 2025, Jimmy Eat World released the single "Failure" and announced the EP Something(s) Loud, which released physically on November 14.

Jimmy Eat World is scheduled to tour North America and Europe in 2026 in celebration of the 25th anniversary of Bleed American. The Get Up Kids, Sunny Day Real Estate, Thrice, and Rise Against are among the support acts announced for select dates on the tour. The band was also confirmed to be on the roster for the Louder Than Life in Louisville, as well as all five dates of the 2026 Vans Warped Tour, but had to cancel some dates in September 2026 due to Adkins needing emergency surgery for a detached retina.

== Musical style and legacy ==
Jimmy Eat World's musical style has been described as an "upbeat version of pop-punk and emo [balancing] commercial instincts with street credibility". According to Andrew Leahey of AllMusic, the band's style "targeted the heart as well as the head". In addition to emo and pop-punk, the band has also been tagged as alternative rock, power pop, pop rock, and punk rock. Frontman Jim Adkins has described their music as "guitar-based, melodic rock."

Jimmy Eat World has been cited as an influence by numerous bands, including Hawthorne Heights, the Starting Line, Basement, Real Friends, Pet Symmetry, Gates, and Shallow Pools. Leahey said, "The emo label proved difficult to shake throughout the 2000s, ... but Jimmy Eat World still remained a league above the generation of genre torchbearers they helped spawn."

In 2019, Consequence ranked the band at number 6 on their list of "The 100 Best Pop Punk Bands".

== Awards and nominations ==
Award	Year	Nominee(s)	Category	Result	Ref.
Billboard Music Awards	2002	Themselves	Top Modern Rock Artist	Nominated	
Billboard Music Awards	2002	"The Middle"	Top Modern Rock Track	Nominated	
MTV Video Music Awards	2002	"The Middle"	Best Rock Video	Nominated	
Teen Choice Awards	2002	"The Middle"	Choice Rock Track	Nominated	
Teen Choice Awards	2002	"The Middle"	Choice Summer Song	Nominated	
Teen Choice Awards	2005	Themselves	Choice Rock Group	Nominated	
Teen Choice Awards	2005	"Pain"	Choice Rock Track	Nominated	

== Band members ==
Current members

- Jim Adkins – lead guitar (1993–present); lead vocals (1995–present; occasional 1993–1995); keyboards (1998–2004); percussion (2001–2002); backing vocals (1993–1995)
- Tom Linton – rhythm guitar (1993–present); backing vocals (1998–present); lead vocals (1993–1998; occasional 1998–present); keyboards (1998–2004, 2012–2013)
- Zach Lind – drums (1993–present); percussion (1998–present), accordion, concertina (1993–1998)
- Rick Burch – bass (1995–present); backing vocals (2000–present)

Current touring musicians

- Robin Vining – keyboards, rhythm guitar, percussion, backing vocals (2011–present)

Former members

- Mitchel Porter – bass (1993–1995)

Former touring musicians

- Mark Kessler – accordion, concertina (1993–1998)
- Rachel Haden – keyboards, percussion, backing vocals (2001–2002)
- Courtney Marie Andrews – keyboards, percussion, backing vocals (2010–2011)

== Selected discography ==
- Jimmy Eat World (1994)
- Static Prevails (1996)
- Clarity (1999)
- Bleed American (2001)
- Futures (2004)
- Chase This Light (2007)
- Invented (2010)
- Damage (2013)
- Integrity Blues (2016)
- Surviving (2019)
