= Jim Adkins =

American rock musician

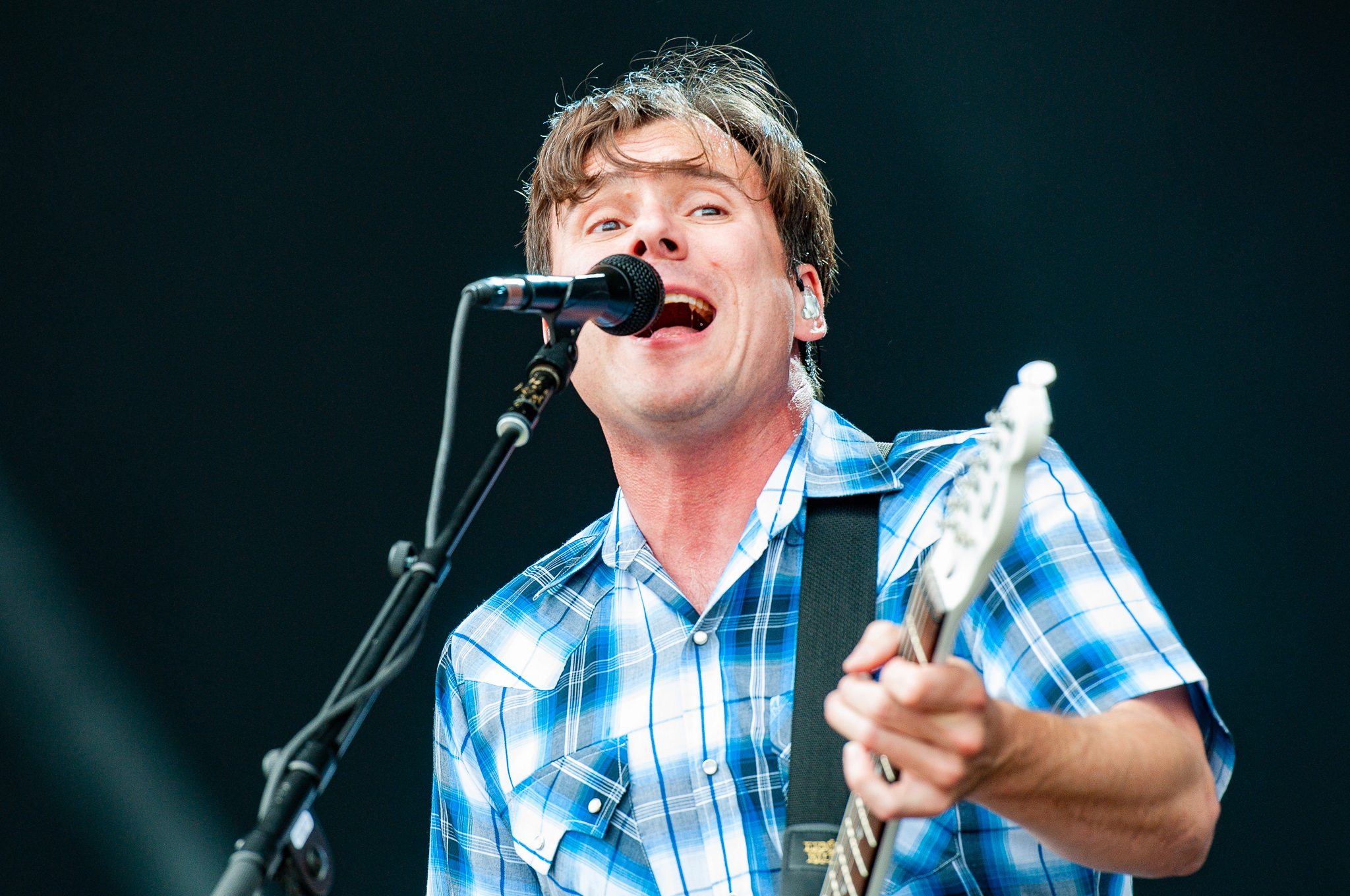
- Adkins performing in 2018

Background information
- Born: James Christopher Adkins; November 10, 1975 (age 50)
- Origin: Mesa, Arizona, U.S.
- Genres: Alternative rock; emo; pop-punk; power pop; pop rock
- Occupations: Musician; singer; songwriter
- Instruments: Vocals; guitar
- Years active: 1993–present
- Labels: Capitol; DreamWorks; Interscope; RCA; Fueled by Ramen; Dine Alone
- Member of: Jimmy Eat World
- Website: jimadkins.net

James Christopher Adkins (born November 10, 1975) is an American musician, best known as the lead singer, guitarist, and songwriter of the rock band Jimmy Eat World.

== Career ==
=== Jimmy Eat World (1993–present) ===
Adkins grew up in Mesa, Arizona, and has been playing guitar since the age of two. He has cited Def Leppard's song "Photograph" as an early influence that sparked his desire to become a guitarist and had also learned songs by hair metal bands such as Mötley Crüe. Although he had an early preference for virtuosic guitar players, he broadened his horizons after being introduced to Fugazi by a cousin in Nebraska, where his family comes from. Adkins has also stated that Drive Like Jehu is his favorite guitar-based band, and his love of the band inspired him to seek out drummer Mark Trombino to produce 1996's Static Prevails. To date, Trombino has produced four of Jimmy Eat World's records.

While attending Mountain View High School, Adkins formed a band named Sonic Pudding, which later changed its name, first to I Ate The Sandbox and then to Schon Theory. This band's style leaned towards West Coast alternative rock bands such as Drive Like Jehu and Rocket from the Crypt. Adkins co-formed Jimmy Eat World in 1993 after being invited by drummer Zach Lind, who Adkins had known since preschool, to form a band with him. Around this time, Adkins teamed up with Joel Leibow to help promote Mesa as a touring spot for musicians in order to build up a local scene. The band released their self-titled debut in 1994, with Adkins primarily on guitar and contributing lead vocals on only a single track, with his other vocal work being backing vocals. Adkins later attended Northern Arizona University in Flagstaff for a time until he was pursued by an agent from Capitol Records. Their second album Static Prevails saw guitarist Tom Linton and Adkins trading spots as the lead vocalist from track to track, and their album Clarity saw Adkins taking over lead vocals for all but one of the tracks.

Following the release of Clarity, which was deemed a commercial failure, Adkins was quoted as saying that he had "grown up a little bit" and "didn't know quite as much as I thought I did when I was 18." Reflecting on the critical and commercial success of Jimmy Eat World's 2001 album Bleed American almost two decades after its release, Adkins claimed that his songwriting in the early days of Jimmy Eat World was "100 percent" unconscious (that is, spontaneous), but that over time he developed a conscious need to make sure each of Jimmy Eat World's records stand up on their own by having a reason for their creation.

Around 2013, Adkins had become sober and has credited his sobriety with enhancing his enjoyment of songwriting.

=== Solo work (2015–present) ===
In 2015, Adkins announced he would be doing his first solo tour following the release of his debut solo EP I Will Go that same year. In 2020, Adkins started a podcast named Pass-Through Frequencies wherein he interviews other musicians.

=== Fender Signature Guitar ===
Fender Guitar includes in its lineup a Jim Adkins Telecaster Thinline semi-hollow body with features, pickups, and modifications designed to support his sound.

== Personal life ==
Adkins has three children with his ex-wife.
