= Damage (Jimmy Eat World album) =

Studio album by Jimmy Eat World
- Released: June 11, 2013
- Recorded: September–October 2012
- Studio: Alain Johannes' home, Los Angeles
- Genre: Power pop; rock
- Length: 37:45
- Label: RCA; Exotic Location
- Producer: Alain Johannes; Jimmy Eat World

Jimmy Eat World chronology
Invented (2010)	Damage (2013)	Integrity Blues (2016)

Singles from Damage
- 1. "I Will Steal You Back" Released: April 16, 2013; 2. "Damage" Released: August 6, 2013

Damage is the eighth studio album by American rock band Jimmy Eat World. It was released on June 11, 2013, through RCA and Exotic Location Recordings. As touring in support of Invented (2010) was winding down by late 2011, the band started writing new material in early 2012. The band spent September and October 2012 at producer Alain Johannes' house in Los Angeles, California recording their next album with analog tape and Pro Tools. Described as an adult breakup album, Damage is a power pop and rock album.

"I Will Steal You Back" was released as the lead single in April 2013, and Jimmy Eat World spent the next few months touring across the United States. The band performed songs on talk shows such as Jimmy Kimmel Live! and Conan. The title-track "Damage" was released as a radio single in August. Stints of the United Kingdom, the US and Europe followed, leading up to an appearance at Reading and Leeds Festivals.

Damage reached number 14 on the US Billboard 200 after selling 24,000 copies in its first week. It peaked in the top 10 of other Billboard component charts: Alternative, Digital, Rock, and Tastemaker Albums. It also charted in Australia, Austria, Germany, Switzerland, and the UK. It was met with a favorable reaction from music critics, being found as an enjoyable listen by many.

== Background and recording ==
Jimmy Eat World released their seventh album Invented in September 2010 through DGC and Interscope Records. It marked the end of their recording contract, enabling the band to become free agents. As touring in support of the album was ending by late 2011, the band began writing new material for their next album in early 2012. By March 2012, frontman Jim Adkins debuted two new songs, "Book of Love" and "You Were Good", during a solo show. In July, drummer Zach Lind revealed that the group were expecting to record within a month. On September 5, the group begun recording, and by October 5, they had finished and were waiting to mix the recordings. Mixing was finished by November 30, and mastering began in early December. Sessions were held at producer Alain Johannes' home in Los Angeles, California, on both analog tape and Pro Tools.

The recording process contrasted the band's previous two studio albums, Chase This Light (2007) and Invented, both of which were done at the band's rehearsal space in Arizona. Lind's drum kit was initially set up in Johannes's guest bedroom before being moved to his living room. Another guest room was used as the control room, while the rest of the instruments were done holed up in his bedroom. The band used tape alongside a computer to record the sessions. As a result, Adkins said the sound was "raw and warm. ... There was less an emphasis on it being clean and perfect ... [and] more about the performance than it sounding pristine. And I think it feels better for what the songs are." Discussing Johannes' contributions, Adkins stated that he had "the best ideas. For what we wanted to do he felt like the right guy. We have a better idea of what we want now, so we didn't need someone that was heavy-handed. We wanted someone to be more like a partner, an ideas guy with fresh ears."

== Composition ==
=== Overview ===
Musically, Damage is a power pop and rock album, drawing comparison to Wasting Light (2011)-era Foo Fighters, and the band's own Bleed American (2001). Similar to Invented, which roughly revolved around a theme, Damage was "an attempt at making an adult breakup record", according to Adkins. The "consequences to what the characters are going through are more significant. ... I'm 37 and the world around me is a lot different than when I was writing breakup songs in my 20s. I tried to reflect that in what the lyrics are."

Adkins intentionally wrote love songs, the kind that attracted him dealt with "adversity and emotional injury. If you have a happy song about how happy you are, ... [t]here's no story there for me. I can't have any empathy." He compared the process of writing the lyrics to that of the band's third studio album, Clarity (1999), stating: "...that's how I approached a lot of emotional things in those days. It's the observation and experience of the world around you, and you develop the ideas from that. ... [With Damage] I'm asking myself the same kinds of questions about things, it's just that I'm in a different place in life, a completely different environment."

=== Tracks ===
The opening track "Appreciation" switches between the 4/4 and 3/4 time signatures. It talks about the narrator realizing the error of his ways. The title-track sees the narrator witness his partner leave amidst broken promises and big expectations. According to Adkins, the song's bridge section was based on an idea he had since 1998. "Lean" opens with a Bruce Springsteen-esque Americana guitar riff, and continues with palm mutes, vocal harmonies and distorted guitar parts. The mid-tempo rock track "Book of Love" was reminiscent of the material on Chase This Light (2007), We, the Vehicles (2005) by Maritime, and Okkervil River. It talks about coming to terms with a failed relationship. "I Will Steal You Back" was reminiscent of a demo from the Futures (2004)-era. "Please Say No" is a ballad that evokes the Bleed American song "Hear You Me", and utilizes electronic elements during the chorus sections. It sees the narrator telling his partner to express "no" after pleading with to take him to a place where no one knows them. "How'd You Have Me" starts with ringing guitars, which recalled "Pride (In the Name of Love)" (1984) by U2, prior to evolving into a garage rock number, complete with shouting.

"No, Never" is a grunge-like number that incorporates new wave synthesizer flourishes. The penultimate song "Byebyelove" channeled the sound of Clarity with its rough production, minimalistic form and crescendos. "You Were Good" employs lo-fi acoustic guitars and droning, reminiscent of the early works of Guided by Voices. It began as an acoustic-based piece, however, when they "tried to take it out of that world, we realized that without the acoustic guitar in there as a bed, it didn't feel the same without it being there", according to Adkins. He further added, they "experimented around a little bit with fleshing it out ... in a full band sense, but at the end of the day we all ... agreed it sounded better with just me and a guitar and the weirdo, Indian drone thing on there." Guitarist and backing vocalist Tom Linton elaborated that it featured Adkins playing an acoustic guitar, recording it "from the beginning to the end live. Then I overdubbed an organ part and Alain [Johannes] played the guitar part."

== Release ==
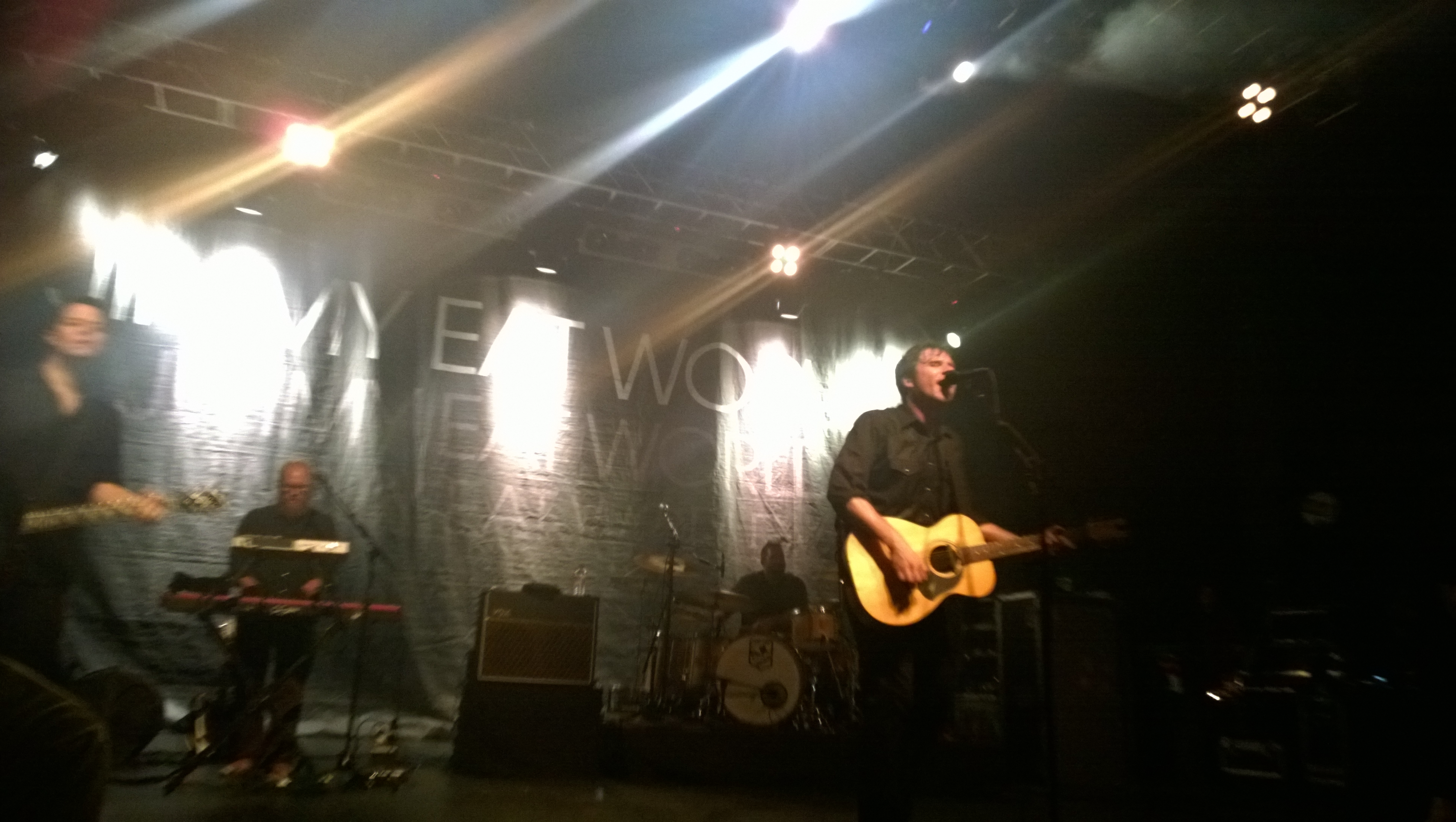
Jimmy Eat World performing live in 2013.

On April 3, 2013, Damage was announced for release in June. In addition, the album's track listing and artwork were revealed. The cover, created by Morning Breath Inc, uses a minimalistic approach: an umbrella that is radiating sunlight against blue fog. "I Will Steal You Back" was made available for streaming on April 10, and released to radio on April 16. The following day, a lyric video was released. On April 20, the group released a 7" vinyl for Record Store Day. It featured "Damage" and a cover of the Radiohead track, "Stop Whispering". In May, the group embarked on a brief US tour, dubbed the Arizona "Home-State" Tour. On May 31, a music video was released for "I Will Steal You Back". Damage was made available for streaming on June 3 through the group's website, before being released on June 11 through RCA and Exotic Location Recordings. Regarding RCA, Adkins noted: "There's a lot of people there we've just crossed paths with over the years and who have been really supportive of us even if they didn't have a stake in how our records did."

The following day, the group played "I Will Steal You Back" and "Damage" on Jimmy Kimmel Live!. A few days after the album's release, the group performed at Download Festival in the UK. Between June and August, the group went on a headlining US tour. On July 23, an iTunes Sessions EP was released, which featured renditions of "Damage", "Appreciation" and "I Will Steal You Back". Shortly afterwards, the group appeared on Conan performing "Damage". "Damage" was released to radio on August 6. In September, the group went on a UK tour. In September and October, the group went on a headlining US tour. It included an appearance at Austin City Limits Music Festival. In November, the group went on a European tour with support from Rival Schools. In February 2014, the band appeared at Soundwave festival in Australia; alongside this, they played two sideshows with Panic! at the Disco and Alkaline Trio. In May, the group played a brief US tour. In August, the group appeared at Reading and Leeds Festivals in the UK.

== Reception ==
Professional ratings
Aggregate scores
Source	Rating
Metacritic	71/100
Review scores
Source	Rating
AbsolutePunk	9.5/10
AllMusic	3/5 stars
Alternative Press	4.5/5 stars
The A.V. Club	C
Kerrang!	4/5 stars
MusicOMH	4/5 stars
NME	7/10
Rock Sound	8/10
Rolling Stone	2/5 stars
Sputnikmusic	3.7/5

Damage received largely positive reviews from music critics upon its release. At Metacritic, which assigns a normalized rating out of 100 to reviews from mainstream critics, the album has received an average score of 71, based on 17 reviews, indicating "generally favourable" feedback. AbsolutePunk's Craig Manning gave the album a very positive review, writing: "Damage is unequivocally my favorite album of the year so far, and I have a feeling that a lot of people ... are going to share that sentiment. Maybe the connection will come on some late and sweltering summer night, and a teenage kid will be climbing into his car with heartbreak on his mind and nothing left to say."

AllMusic's Matt Collar also gave the album a positive review, stating: "Damage, is a mature breakup album that still retains all of the band's youthful, sock-to-the-gut pop energy. [...] The album also builds nicely upon the power pop/dance-rock vibe of their 2010 release, Invented, with an even more focused, lyrical approach that helps make this one of the band's most cathartic and moving albums of its career." Scott Heisel, writing for Alternative Press, praised Johannes' production, stating: "Thankfully, Damage easily bests the previous two Jimmy Eat World full lengths, and its high points rival those of Futures and Bleed American. Recorded to tape by Alain Johannes (Queens of the Stone Age, No Doubt), the album is full-bodied and warm, with an organic bleed from the drum mics and a sonic resonance you just can't get digitally."

Rock Sound named Damage "Album of the Month", writing: "Jimmy Eat World are undoubtedly an enigma. Now eight albums deep into their career, they never really slumped into any sort of mid-season funk that other bands of their age and ilk have. [...] With no reason to buck the trend, Damage very much continues the Arizonan four-piece's reliability streak." Consequence of Sound's Ryan Bray wrote: "In their quest to update the breakup record for those a bit too old to mope and stew in their juices, Jimmy Eat World succeeds here for the most part. Society might expect those broaching 40 to have their shit more or less figured out, but Damage proves you're never too old to reevaluate and take stock of the past."

Drowned in Sound's Sammy Maine, however, gave the album a mixed review, writing: "There's flashes of Jimmy Eat World brilliance and even a few classics in there, but this is an album that's also prone to a few fillers and cheesy one liners. This is a band that should be beyond mediocre offerings but sadly, there's just one too many on Damage." The A.V. Club's Kyle Ryan gave the album a mostly negative review, stating: "While the group's predictability has traditionally been a positive assurance of quality, it's now more indicative of stasis. Damage doesn't offend, but it doesn't offer much that's memorable, either." Rolling Stone's Nick Catucci gave the album a negative review, stating: "On their first album since 2010, the Arizona guys still sound sweet. They're also hall-monitor dull – these meat and potatoes sure could use some fresh gravy."

Damage debuted at number 14 on the US Billboard 200 chart, selling 24,000 copies in its first week. As of October 2016, the album has sold 50,000 copies. It charted on several Billboard component charts: number two on Alternative Albums, number four on Rock Albums, number eight on Tastemaker Albums, and number nine on Digital Albums. Outside of the US, the album reached number 26 in Australia, number 38 in the UK, number 41 in Germany, number 54 in Austria, and number 55 in Switzerland. Alternative Press included the album on their list of the essential albums of the year.

== Track listing ==
All songs written by Jimmy Eat World.

No.	Title	Length
1.	"Appreciation"	3:15
2.	"Damage"	3:07
3.	"Lean"	3:04
4.	"Book of Love"	3:55
5.	"I Will Steal You Back"	3:28
6.	"Please Say No"	4:40
7.	"How'd You Have Me"	3:42
8.	"No, Never"	3:50
9.	"Byebyelove"	4:31
10.	"You Were Good"	4:13
Total length:		37:45

Japanese edition
No.	Title	Length
11.	"Step One"	3:15

== Personnel ==
The following personnel contributed to Damage:

Jimmy Eat World

- Jim Adkins – lead vocals, guitar
- Tom Linton – guitar, backing vocals, organ (track 10)
- Rick Burch – bass guitar, backing vocals
- Zach Lind – drums

Additional musicians

- Alain Johannes – additional guitar (track 10)

Production

- Alain Johannes – producer
- Jimmy Eat World – producer
- James Brown – mixing
- Ted Jensen – mastering
- Morning Breath Inc. – art direction, design
- Michael Elins – photos

== Charts ==
Chart	Peak position
Australian Albums (ARIA)	26
Austrian Albums (Ö3 Austria)	54
German Albums (Offizielle Top 100)	41
Swiss Albums (Schweizer Hitparade)	55
US Billboard 200	14
US Top Alternative Albums (Billboard)	2
US Digital Albums (Billboard)	9
US Top Rock Albums (Billboard)	4
US Indie Store Album Sales (Billboard)	8
UK Albums (OCC)	38
