= Integrity Blues =

Studio album by Jimmy Eat World
- Released: October 21, 2016
- Recorded: Late 2015
- Studio: Sunset Sound; Chez JMJ; Unit 2
- Genre: Alternative rock; emo; pop rock
- Length: 46:39
- Label: RCA; Exotic Location
- Producer: Justin Meldal-Johnsen; Jimmy Eat World

Jimmy Eat World chronology
Damage (2013)	Integrity Blues (2016)	Surviving (2019)

Singles from Integrity Blues
- 1. "Sure and Certain" Released: August 30, 2016; 2. "Get Right" Released: February 28, 2017

Integrity Blues is the ninth studio album by American rock band Jimmy Eat World. It released on October 21, 2016, by RCA and Exotic Location Recordings. After touring in support of Damage (2013), the band members took a break. They reconvened and began writing with producer Justin Meldal-Johnsen, with recording beginning in late 2015. Sessions were held at Sunset Sound, Chez JMJ, and Unit 2. Described as an alternative rock, emo and pop rock album, Integrity Blues was compared to Silversun Pickups and late period Death Cab for Cutie.

Preceded by release of lead single "Sure and Certain" in August, the band toured Europe and the United States, leading up to the release of the album. It was promoted with further stints in Europe and the US until the end of the year. "Get Right" was released as the second single in February 2017, which was followed up by tours of US, South America, and Germany.

Integrity Blues was met with favorable reaction from music critics, many of which commented on the lyrics and production. The album peaked at number 17 on the US Billboard 200, in addition to charting in Australia, Canada, Germany, Ireland, Switzerland, and the UK. Alternative Press and Sputnikmusic considered it one of the best albums of the year.

== Background and production ==
Jimmy Eat World released their eighth album Damage in April 2013. Touring in support of it took place in the US and Europe, leading up to an appearance at Reading and Leeds Festivals in mid-2014. Following this, the band went on a 10th anniversary tour for their fifth album Futures (2004), playing in the US, Australia, and New Zealand. The members re-group and decided to take a break throughout 2015, preferring to focus their efforts on other things. Frontman Jim Adkins performed solo shows and released a series of singles; bassist Rick Burch ran a distillery in Arizona; drummer Zach Lind made two EPs with his wife under the name the Wretched Desert; and guitarist Tom Linton took up boxing.

Jimmy Eat World intentionally wanted to work with a new producer that they had no past experience with, and to push them out of their comfort zone. During the writing of their next album, the band brought in Justin Meldal-Johnsen. By this point, the material they had was in varying states of completion. In late 2015, the band travelled to Los Angeles, California to record their next album. Sessions were held at Sunset Sound, Chez JMJ and Unit 2, with Meldal-Johnsen and the band sharing the producer role. Mike Schuppan, Carlos de la Garza, Meldal-Johnsen, Adkins and Lind acted as engineers, with assistance from Geoff Neal. Ken Andrews mixed the recordings while Dave Cooley mastered them at Elysian Mastering.

== Composition ==
=== Overview ===
Musically, the sound of Integrity Blues has been described as alternative rock, and pop rock, drawing comparison to Silversun Pickups and late period Death Cab for Cutie. While it has also been tagged as emo by one critic, this has been disputed by another. Adkins said it was about "throwing away your default responses to life, accept life on the terms of life and becoming willing to accept the best any of us have is to be in a state of progress." As Damage tackled problems, Adkins wanted Integrity Blues to take on the situations behind those problems, whether it be relationship issues or one's position in life. Adkins also stated in a podcast interview in April 2020 that he considered himself an "Alcoholic" and had got sober around the time of writing the album. Meldal-Johnsen provided keyboards, programming and percussion to the recordings. While the band has previously employed the use of synthesizers on their past releases, they used it more on Integrity Blues, which was aided due by Meldal-Johnsen's enthusiasm for the instrument.

Consequence writer Ben Kaye said the album acted as the "perfect bridge between Bleed American vulnerability and Futures aggression". Courtney Marie Andrews contributed additional vocals on "You with Me", "Sure and Certain" and "Pol Roger", alongside Robin Vining, who sung on "You with Me", "Sure and Certain" and "Pretty Grids". Vining also added keyboards to "The End Is Beautiful" and "Pol Roger". Roger Joseph Manning Jr. arranged the strings, brass and woodwind accompaniment heard on title-track and "Pol Roger". Vannessa Frebairn-Smith acted as the session leader for these arrangements, which comprised Mike Whitson on viola, Rob Schear on trumpet, Nick Daley on trombone, Lara Wickes on English horn, and Jessica Pearlman on oboe. Adkins wanted to include the brass instrumentation as a backing instrument as he had previously employed it on his solo material.

=== Tracks ===
The opening track "You with Me" begins with acoustic guitars, and continues with falsetto vocal harmonies. "Sure and Certain" starts with grunge guitars, and is aided by a choral section akin to Chvrches. "It Matters" lacks any guitars, and consists of piano. The alternative rock song "Pretty Grids" recalls the sound of the band's seventh album Chase This Light. "Pass the Baby" starts off as a no-fi electronic track that sees Adkins singing over programmed drums, with guitarwork akin to the xx. It switches to math rock and concludes with a heavy coda section, which was reminiscent of The Fragile (1999)-era Nine Inch Nails, and the Smashing Pumpkins. According to Adkins, the song talks about manipulation and how one's "short-term gains sometimes come back and blossom into something that's not really what you expected or hoped for," and having to deal with that. "Get Right" is driven by an aggressive downtuned guitar riff, and heavy-sounding percussion instrumentation. "You Are Free" sees Linton utilize arpeggiated guitar notes in the vein of American Football.

"The End Is Beautiful" a mid-tempo ballad; its slow acoustic guitarwork earned it a comparison to "Hear You Me" and "Cautioners", both tracks from Bleed American. The "Work"-esque "Through" returns to the upbeat nature of "Sure and Certain". The title-track sees Adkins' vocals accompanied by an organs and string section in the style of Van Dyke Parks. He said it began as "an acoustic waltz kind of thing", before changing into its final form. The closing track "Pol Roger" features horns and an orchestral section, ending with a chorus singing "na na na". The song talks about finding contentment with being alone, without feeling lonely, while the title alludes to a hotel chain in Glasgow where all of the rooms are named after alcoholic beverages. The first verses sees Adkins explore a beach close to Hyde Park in Sydney, Australia. Journalist Alex Rice felt that it, alongside the band's previous album closers, owes its debt to "Anderson Mesa", the final song from their second studio album Static Prevails (1996), as that song laid the groundwork for the band's "sprawling epics [that] have become a signature sign-off".

== Release ==
On August 19, 2016, the band posted a teaser on their website, hinting at a new album. Two days later, "Get Right" premiered on BBC Radio 1. It was available on the band's official website for free download, and a lyric video was released. On August 30, the band debuted the lead single "Sure and Certain" on KROQ-FM. It was released on 7" vinyl, with the extra song "My Enemy", which was used as part of the 30 Days, 30 Songs project. On the same day, Integrity Blues was announced for release in October, and a lyric video was released for "Sure and Certain". On September 6, the band revealed the album's track listing and artwork. For the remainder of the month, and throughout October, the band played small shows and festivals across Europe and North American. They were aided by Vining, who played guitar and keyboards.

In late September 2016, the band performed "Sure and Certain" on The Late Show with Stephen Colbert. Lyric videos were released for "You with Me" and "You Are Free" on October 7 and 14, respectively. Integrity Blues was released on October 21 through RCA and Exotic Location Recordings. Four days later, the band appeared on Jimmy Kimmel Live!, again playing "Sure and Certain". After a series of shows in California, the band embarked on a European tour in November. On November 16, a music video was released for "Sure and Certain", directed by Flynt Flossy. After returning to the US, the band played a run of shows from late November into mid-December. In January 2017, the group appeared on Conan, performing "Get Right" and "Integrity Blues".

Later that month, the band played a few shows in Australia around an appearance at the Australian Open. "Get Right" was released to alternative radio stations on February 28, 2017. In February and March, the band toured the southern US states, with support from AJJ. Following this, the band went on a brief South American tour in March and April, appearing at Lollapalooza Chile. The band then went on a cross-country US tour in April and May, with support from Beach Slang. On June 29, a music video was released for "Get Right". The band then played four shows in Germany in June and July, prior to a North American stint with Incubus in July and August. They then made an appearance at the Reading and Leeds Festivals in the UK. In December, the Integrity Blues Acoustic EP was released, featuring acoustic versions of "Integrity Blues", "Sure and Certain" and "Get Right".

== Reception ==
Professional ratings
Aggregate scores
Source	Rating
Metacritic	76/100
Review scores
Source	Rating
AllMusic	4/5 stars
The A.V. Club	B
Consequence of Sound	B−
Drowned in Sound	7/10
Exclaim!	7/10
Louder Than War	7/10
The Music	3.5/5 stars
Pitchfork	7.3/10
Sputnikmusic	5/5
Ultimate Guitar	7.7/10

Integrity Blues was well received by music critics upon its release. On the review aggregating website Metacritic, the album obtained an average score of 76, based on 12 critics, indicating "generally favorable reviews". AllMusic reviewer Neil Z. Yeung said it "shines in the dark with glimmering production, [and] a refreshed sense for hooks ... strik[ing] a clean balance between past and present". Sputnikmusic staff member SowingSeason found it to contain "breathtaking melodies and intimate lyrics", with the "dreamy sensation and emotional relevance of Futures". The A.V. Club writer Zoe Camp considered it their "glossiest release to date", witnessing the band "doubling down on the jagged hooks and dulcet-sung choruses ... festooned with their usual angst". Consequence of Sound senior writer Karen Gwee wrote that the band "harness a distinctly darker, slower sound" with Integrity Blues, full of "oblique Adkins lines for the books". Ultimate Guitar staff team said that if the listener was looking for "catchy lyrics and emotional melodies ... then you may be pleasantly surprised" as the music was "very easy to get into".

Pitchfork contributor Ian Cohen said it was a "complete fabrication of a four-person rock band, a proudly produced record". He added that the album "finds itself sharing its dominant concern of using the [emo] genre's inherent vulnerability and introspection to promote self-esteem rather than self-pity". The Music writer Tash Loh begins with "a slow-burning build", eventually "fad[ing] through beat-driven tracks". Sam Lambeth of Louder Than War wrote that the album was "a complete contrast to Damage's muscular minimalism", with Meldal-Johnsen "sprinkl[ing] his dynamic DNA all over the album's tracks ... keep[ing] the record fun and exciting". Drowned in Sound's Aidan Reynolds found it "a wonderful thing to hear Jimmy Eat World rediscover the form that stretched from Clarity through Futures ... their dedication to honest, wide-eyed songcraft has resulted in their best album in over a decade". Exclaim! writer Ian Gormely said it followed a "rough guide" of studio experimentation started by Clarity, while taking "some steps towards improvising a few lines". In other parts of the album, "the band fall back into their usual groove".

Integrity Blues charted at number 17 on the US Billboard 200, and number four on the Billboard Alternative Albums chart. Outside of the US, the album reached number 21 in the UK, number 27 in Australia, number 25 in Germany, number 14 in Ireland, number 70 in Canada, and number 80 in Switzerland. "Sure and Certain" charted at number 10 on Alternative Airplay, number 14 on Rock Airplay, number 17 on Triple A Songs, and number 32 on Hot Rock & Alternative Songs.

=== Accolades ===
Publication	Rank	List
Alternative Press	N/A	The 30 Best Albums of 2016
Sputnikmusic	14	Top 50 Albums of 2016

== Track listing ==
All songs written by Jimmy Eat World. All songs produced by Justin Meldal-Johnsen and Jimmy Eat World.

No.	Title	Length
1.	"You with Me"	5:18
2.	"Sure and Certain"	3:35
3.	"It Matters"	3:54
4.	"Pretty Grids"	4:11
5.	"Pass the Baby"	5:23
6.	"Get Right"	2:49
7.	"You Are Free"	4:14
8.	"The End Is Beautiful"	4:25
9.	"Through"	2:51
10.	"Integrity Blues"	3:12
11.	"Pol Roger"	6:47
Total length:		46:39

== Personnel ==
Personnel per booklet.

Jimmy Eat World

- Jim Adkins
- Rick Burch
- Zach Lind
- Tom Linton

Additional musicians

- Courtney Marie Andrews – additional vocals (tracks 1, 2 and 11)
- Robin Vining – additional vocals (tracks 1, 2 and 4); keyboards (tracks 8 and 11)
- Justin Meldal-Johnsen – keyboards, programming, percussion
- Roger Joseph Manning Jr. – strings, brass and woodwinds arrangement (tracks 10 and 11)
- Steve Aho – music copying, orchestration
- Vannessa Frebairn-Smith – cello and orchestral session leader
- Mike Whitson – viola
- Rob Schear – trumpet
- Nick Daley – trombone
- Lara Wickes – English horn
- Jessica Pearlman – oboe

Production

- Justin Meldal-Johnsen – producer, engineer
- Jimmy Eat World – producer
- Mike Schuppan – engineer
- Carlos de la Garza – engineer
- Jim Adkins – engineer
- Zach Lind – engineer
- Geoff Neal – assistant engineer
- Ken Andrews – mixing
- Dave Cooley – mastering
- Olivia Smith – art direction
- Sandra Luk – art direction
- Natalie O'Moore – photography

== Charts ==
Chart (2016)	Peak position
Australian Albums (ARIA)	27
Canadian Albums (Billboard)	70
German Albums (Offizielle Top 100)	35
Irish Albums (IRMA)	41
New Zealand Heatseekers Albums (RMNZ)	6
Scottish Albums (OCC)	15
Swiss Albums (Schweizer Hitparade)	80
UK Albums (OCC)	21
US Billboard 200	17
US Top Alternative Albums (Billboard)	4
