= Sure and Certain =

Single by Jimmy Eat World

from the album Integrity Blues
- B-side: "My Enemy"
- Released: August 30, 2016
- Recorded: 2015–16
- Genre: Alternative rock; indie rock; pop rock
- Length: 3:35
- Label: RCA
- Songwriters: Jim Adkins; Rick Burch; Zach Lind; Tom Linton
- Producer: Justin Meldal-Johnsen

Jimmy Eat World singles chronology
| "Damage" (2013) | "Sure and Certain" (2016) | "Get Right" (2017) |

"Sure and Certain" is the lead single from Jimmy Eat World's ninth studio album, Integrity Blues. It was released on August 30, 2016. The single's B-side, "My Enemy", is a protest anthem against Donald Trump that was notably recorded for Dave Eggers' 30 Days, 30 Songs project.

== Track list ==
| No. | Title | Length |
|---|---|---|
| 1. | "Sure and Certain" | 3:35 |
| 2. | "My Enemy" | 3:33 |

== Chart performance ==
"Sure and Certain" debuted at number 31 on the Billboard Alternative Songs chart. It peaked at number 10, making it the band's highest-charting single since "My Best Theory" reached number two on the chart in 2010.

| Chart (2016) | Peak position |
|---|---|
| US Hot Rock & Alternative Songs (Billboard) | 32 |
| US Alternative Airplay (Billboard) | 10 |
| US Adult Alternative Airplay (Billboard) | 17 |
| US Rock & Alternative Airplay (Billboard) | 14 |
