= The Middle (Jimmy Eat World song) =

2001 single by Jimmy Eat World

- US artwork, also used in the UK and Europe

Single by Jimmy Eat World

from the album Bleed American
- B-side: "A Praise Chorus" (Radio 1 Session)
- Released: October 2001
- Genre: Pop-punk; alternative rock; emo pop; power pop
- Length: 2:46
- Label: DreamWorks
- Songwriter: Jimmy Eat World
- Producers: Jimmy Eat World; Mark Trombino

Jimmy Eat World singles chronology
"Bleed American" (2001)	"The Middle" (2001)	"Last Christmas" (2001)

Alternative cover
- Artwork variant used in the UK, Europe, and Australia

Music video
- "The Middle" on YouTube

"The Middle" is a song by American rock band Jimmy Eat World. It was released in October 2001 as the second single from their fourth album, Bleed American (2001). Written by frontman Jim Adkins, the track emerged during a transitional period for the band after being dropped by Capitol Records. Conceived as part of a deliberate shift toward a simpler and more direct sound, the song's concise structure and power-pop sensibility marked a departure from the group's earlier, more complex work.

Lyrically, "The Middle" addresses themes of social unease, alienation, and self-acceptance, encouraging listeners not to "write [themselves] off" in the face of exclusion or insecurity. Its message was partly inspired by a fan's account of feeling marginalized, reflecting the band's engagement with the inclusive ideals of punk culture. Despite its anthemic tone, the song was written quickly at home, with Adkins completing much of it in a single day, influenced in part by the straightforward songwriting style of Bruce Springsteen.

"The Middle" gradually gained momentum through radio airplay before achieving widespread commercial success. It reached number one on Billboard's Modern Rock Tracks chart and peaked at number five on the Hot 100, becoming the band’s highest-charting single. It also reached the top 50 in Australia, Ireland, New Zealand, and the United Kingdom. Its crossover appeal from alternative rock to mainstream pop audiences, supported by heavy rotation on MTV, helped establish it as a defining song of the early 2000s and the band’s most enduring hit.

== Background ==
Following the release of Clarity (1999), Jimmy Eat World was dropped from Capitol Records due to low sales and limited radio performance. Despite this setback, the band continued to build a following through extensive touring and word of mouth, maintaining visibility within the alternative and college radio circuits. Their song "Lucky Denver Mint", featured in the film Never Been Kissed, became a modest success and helped sustain their momentum.

Rather than disband, the group opted to record their next album independently. Working with producer Mark Trombino, the band financed sessions through touring revenue and recorded intermittently between tours. The process allowed for creative autonomy, with minimal external oversight, and coincided with a growing sense of optimism as their live audiences gradually expanded. "On our new stuff, rather than challenging ourselves [by] getting real experimental, we kind of went in the other direction, challenging ourselves by getting very simple," said Jim Adkins.

== Writing and composition ==
"The Middle" was written by Adkins in 1999 during a period when he was experimenting with home recording at his home in Tempe, Arizona. He had purchased a drum kit from Lind and was learning the instrument when he developed a driving drumbeat inspired by Tom Petty's "You Wreck Me". He began developing a guitar melody that would become the foundation of the song, completing much of the lyrics in a single day.

The lyrical theme was influenced by a fan email the band received after making Static Prevails. The message, sent on AOL by a young listener who felt excluded by her peers despite sharing similar musical tastes, prompted Adkins to reflect on the inclusive ethos of punk culture. This perspective informed the song's central message of self-acceptance and resilience, encouraging listeners not to seek validation from exclusionary social groups. At the time of writing, Adkins had also been listening to Bruce Springsteen, whose influence helped shape the song's uplifting tone. When he brought it to the band, they recognized it was a strong contender for the album, making various adjustments to its structure.

The song's arrangement continued to evolve in the studio. According to Adkins, the original demo did not include a guitar solo, which was developed later during the recording process. The final solo incorporates hammer-on and pull-off techniques influenced in part by Doug Gillard of Guided by Voices, particularly his playing on the song "I Am a Tree". Lind mimicked the style of the Petty song in recording the drums, aiming to replicate its straightforward feel.

== Release and commercial performance ==
Despite its eventual success, the song was not initially regarded as a standout. Adkins downplayed the song at the time, later stating that he considered it one of the weaker tracks on the album because it had come together quickly, noting that the writing process took only a few hours and that he initially placed less value on material developed with such ease. Trombino agreed; "I'm not a hitmaker guy. I'm not a guy who understands pop music really well. It didn't really resonate with me the way that other songs did," he said later. Music executive Luke Wood, the band's A&R at DreamWorks, similarly recalled that the demo did not immediately impress him, describing it as a subdued, palm-muted track reminiscent of Springsteen and John Mellencamp. At the time, the band was not initially positioned as a mainstream breakthrough act by their label, which had recently achieved success with artists such as Papa Roach, Lifehouse, Alien Ant Farm, and Nelly Furtado. Instead, the group was expected to continue building its audience through touring and support from its existing fanbase.

"The Middle" ultimately became the most commercially successful single released from Bleed American. It first gained traction on modern rock radio in major U.S. markets, where it climbed the charts rapidly. By early 2002, the song had reached the top of the Billboard Modern Rock Tracks chart. It also marked the band's only appearance on the publication's Mainstream Rock Tracks chart, peaking at number 39. The song then crossed over to top 40 radio, resulting in it reaching a peak of number five on the Billboard Hot 100. Its crossover into mainstream pop radio was especially notable, given the band had been an underground emo act only two years prior. Although they would have more top 40 hits on the former chart, "The Middle" remains their only top 40 hit on the Hot 100 to date. "The Middle" was the most played song on radio in Canada in 2002. The song also charted in the UK, reaching a peak of number 26 in 2002.

To promote the song, the band made an appearance on Saturday Night Live on April 6, 2002. They also performed the song live on Last Call with Carson Daly.

== Reception ==
Pitchfork Media named the track number 165 on its list of the top 500 tracks of the 2000s. Reviewer Mark Richardson wrote of the track: "And if your band delivers that message of hope with the kind of power-pop chorus hook that gives the best couple of Weezer songs a run for their money, you've accomplished something." In 2012, The A.V. Club published an article entitled "How Jimmy Eat World's 'The Middle' Became the Best Song for a Bad Time", with Jason Heller noting, "'The Middle' wasn't a sellout. It was a return to form, one made by a band that had a lot more wisdom, scars, and songwriting talent than it did seven years prior—and a band that was in a position where do or die looked like the only options."

Critics compared Kelly Clarkson's single "Heartbeat Song" (2015) to "The Middle" due to a notable similarity between the melodies of the songs' verses, as well as their choruses. In his review for Idolator, Bradley Stern observed both songs' similitude. Hunter Hauk of The Dallas Morning News also remarked of the two songs' similarities, but was ambivalent about "Heartbeat Song"'s lack of innovation as compared to Clarkson's previous lead singles.

== Music video ==
The music video for "The Middle" was developed as a narrative-driven concept, marking a departure from the band’s earlier, more performance-oriented visuals. The creative direction centered on a high school house party scenario, reflecting the song's themes of social anxiety and belonging. In the clip, a teenage boy (Josh Keleher) attends a pool party at which Jimmy Eat World is playing, only to find everyone, except the band, in their underwear. Much of the crowd is making out, but the boy is excluded. Finally, out of frustration, he starts to strip to be like the others, only to bump into a teenage girl doing the same thing in the closet he is in. The kids keep their clothes on and leave the party, arms around each other, as the song concludes.

The video was directed by Paul Fedor. The band granted Fedor significant creative control, prioritizing a concept that would resonate with audiences and receive substantial airplay. Fedor based the video's central idea on a scenario popularized by The Brady Bunch, in which individuals are encouraged to imagine others in their underwear to cope with nervousness. Casting initially drew from typical Los Angeles music video performers, though the production team ultimately sought a more relatable and diverse group of participants. In the days leading up to filming, many extras were recruited from Arizona State University, including friends and acquaintances of the band. The video received heavy rotation on MTV, particularly during a period when the network remained a major platform for music discovery via Total Request Live.

== Track listings ==
US CD single

1. "The Middle"
2. "If You Don't Don't" (XFM Session)
3. "Game of Pricks" (Radio 1 Session)
4. "The Middle" (CD-ROM video)

UK 7-inch and cassette single

A. "The Middle"
B. "A Praise Chorus" (Radio 1 Session)

UK CD single

1. "The Middle" (LP version) – 2:48
2. "No Sensitivity" (non LP version) – 3:41

European CD single

1. "The Middle" (LP version) – 2:48
2. "No Sensitivity" (non LP version) – 3:41
3. "The Middle" (early demo) – 2:48
4. "My Sundown" (demo) – 3:09

Australian CD single

1. "The Middle" (LP version) – 2:48
2. "No Sensitivity" (non LP version) – 3:41
3. "The Middle" (early demo) – 2:48
4. "The Middle" (video)

Australian Tour CD EP

1. "The Middle" (album version) – 2:46
2. "A Praise Chorus" (album version) – 4:04
3. "Bleed American" (live) – 3:08
4. "Firestarter" – 6:25
5. "The Middle" (acoustic) – 3:09

== Personnel ==
Personnel are adapted from the Bleed American CD booklet.

Jimmy Eat World

- Jim Adkins – vocals, guitar, percussion
- Rick Burch – bass guitar
- Zach Lind – drums

Additional personnel

- Mark Trombino – synth emulator programming

== Charts ==
=== Weekly charts ===
Weekly chart performance for "The Middle"
Chart (2002–2003)	Peak position
Australia (ARIA)	49
Canada CHR (Nielsen BDS)	2
France (SNEP)	98
Ireland (IRMA)	46
Netherlands (Single Top 100)	92
New Zealand (Recorded Music NZ)	28
Scottish Singles Sales (Official Charts)	29
UK Singles (Official Charts)	26
UK Rock & Metal (Official Charts)	2
US Billboard Hot 100	5
US Adult Pop Airplay (Billboard)	2
US Alternative Airplay (Billboard)	1
US Mainstream Rock (Billboard)	39
US Pop Airplay (Billboard)	4

=== Year-end charts ===
2002 year-end chart performance for "The Middle"
Chart (2002)	Position
Canada Radio (Nielsen BDS)	1
US Billboard Hot 100	14
US Adult Top 40 (Billboard)	6
US Mainstream Top 40 (Billboard)	21
US Modern Rock Tracks (Billboard)	3
US Triple-A (Billboard)	16

2003 year-end chart performance for "The Middle"
Chart (2003)	Position
US Adult Top 40 (Billboard)	96

=== Decade-end charts ===
Decade-end chart performance for "The Middle"
Chart (2000–2009)	Position
US Hot Alternative Songs (Billboard)	20

== Certifications ==
Certifications and sales for "The Middle"
Region	Certification	Certified units/sales
Denmark (IFPI Danmark)	Gold	45,000^{‡}
Germany (BVMI)	Gold	250,000^{‡}
New Zealand (RMNZ)	4× Platinum	120,000^{‡}
Spain (Promusicae)	Gold	30,000^{‡}
United Kingdom (BPI)	2× Platinum	1,200,000^{‡}
United States (RIAA)	9× Platinum	9,000,000^{‡}
^{‡} Sales+streaming figures based on certification alone.

== Release history ==
Release dates and formats for "The Middle"
Region	Date	Format(s)	Label(s)	Ref.
United States	October 2001	Alternative radio	DreamWorks	
United Kingdom	January 28, 2002	7-inch vinyl; CD; cassette	DreamWorks	
Australia	February 11, 2002	CD	DreamWorks	
United States	March 4, 2002	Contemporary hit; hot adult contemporary radio	DreamWorks	
Australia	January 20, 2003	CD EP	DreamWorks	

== Covers ==
In July 2022, a bootleg recording of Prince covering the song at an after-party for the 2009 Oscars resurfaced online. Adkins and drummer Zach Lind played the cover during an interview with Rock Sound, with Adkins describing the cover as "such a trip".

A cover of the song by Kelty Greye and KidMotel plays over the climactic sequence of the film Supergirl (2026).
