= Pain (Jimmy Eat World song) =

Single by Jimmy Eat World

from the album Futures
- Released: September 14, 2004
- Genre: Skate punk; emo
- Length: 2:51
- Label: Interscope
- Songwriters: Jim Adkins; Rick Burch; Zach Lind; Tom Linton
- Producer: Gil Norton

Jimmy Eat World singles chronology
| "A Praise Chorus" (2002) | "Pain" (2004) | "Work" (2004) |

"Pain" is a song by American rock band Jimmy Eat World. It was released on September 14, 2004, as the first single from their 2004 album Futures and became their second number-one hit on the Billboard Modern Rock Tracks chart. Although its album is not their most successful and "Pain" is not the highest-charting single, the single has received Gold status by the RIAA, making "Pain" Jimmy Eat World's second best-selling single, after 2001's "The Middle".

== Track listing ==
CD

1. Pain (album version)
2. Shame (demo)
3. Yer Feet (live acoustic) (Mojave 3 cover)
4. Pain (video)

7"

1. Pain (2:51)
2. Shame (5:40)

== Music video ==
The video, which was directed by Paul Fedor, features a young man who constantly does things which cause him pain (including submerging himself in water for extended periods of time, throwing himself down a flight of stairs, and draping himself in meat and letting attack dogs maul him), but he doesn't appear to feel any of it. He is followed and constantly attacked by two twin children, dressed as Ari and Uzi Tenenbaum, with baseball bats. At the end, the young woman featured in flashes through the rest of the video arrives by his side, and when the twins hit him again, he finally has a reaction to pain. At the end of the video they walk off together. The video also features footage of the band playing inside a garage, and at the end of the video frontman Jim Adkins throws his guitar out of the garage and then throws himself to the ground.

Christina McDowell, who plays the young woman in the video, would become a critically acclaimed author in 2015 with her memoir After Perfect: A Daughter's Memoir.

== Popular culture ==
The song appears in the season 4 episode of Smallville, "Transference". It also appears in the video games Midnight Club 3: DUB Edition, Tony Hawk's Underground 2, Guitar Hero: Van Halen and DLC for Rock Band.

== Charts ==
=== Weekly charts ===
Weekly chart performance for "Pain"
| Chart (2004) | Peak position |
|---|---|
| Canada Rock Top 30 (Radio & Records) | 5 |
| Scotland Singles (OCC) | 40 |
| UK Singles (OCC) | 38 |
| UK Rock & Metal (OCC) | 4 |
| US Billboard Hot 100 | 93 |
| US Alternative Airplay (Billboard) | 1 |

=== Year-end charts ===
2004 year-end chart performance for "Pain"
| Chart (2004) | Position |
|---|---|
| US Modern Rock Tracks (Billboard) | 41 |

2005 year-end chart performance for "Pain"
| Chart (2005) | Position |
|---|---|
| US Modern Rock Tracks (Billboard) | 22 |

== Certifications ==
Certifications for "Pain"
| Region | Certification | Certified units/sales |
|---|---|---|
| United States (RIAA) | Gold | 500,000^{^} |
^{^} Shipments figures based on certification alone.
