= Chase This Light =

Studio album by Jimmy Eat World
- Released: October 16, 2007
- Recorded: August–October 2006; December 2006; March and May 2007
- Studios: Unit 2 (Tempe, Arizona); Seedy Underbelly (Los Angeles, CA); Conway
- Genres: Alternative rock; power pop; pop-punk; pop rock
- Length: 40:18
- Label: Interscope
- Producers: Jimmy Eat World; Chris Testa; John Fields

Jimmy Eat World chronology
Stay on My Side Tonight (2005)	Chase This Light (2007)	Invented (2010)

Singles from Chase This Light
- 1. "Big Casino" Released: August 28, 2007; 2. "Always Be" Released: December 3, 2007; 3. "Let It Happen" Released: April 8, 2008

Chase This Light is the sixth studio album by American rock band Jimmy Eat World. The band began working on the follow-up to Futures (2004) by late 2005, and had made demos by early 2006. They started recording their next album with engineer Chris Testa between Arizona and California. Butch Vig was enlisted as an executive producer, acting in a consultancy role, where he would provide feedback on the material. Sessions began in August 2006 and lasted until May 2007, with tours of the US and Europe in between. Described as a power pop, pop rock and pop-punk record, the guitars drew comparison to the Outfield and U2, while individual song comparisons were made to the likes of the Killers, the All-American Rejects and Shout Out Louds.

Preceded by the release of "Big Casino", Chase This Light was released on October 16, 2007, through Interscope Records. It was met with a favorable reaction from music critics, a few of them noted a return to the sound of Bleed American (2001). Chase This Light charted at number 5 on the US Billboard 200 after selling 62,000 copies in its first week, and by 2008 it has sold 155,000 copies. It reached the top 5 on three Billboard component charts, and charted highly in Canada, the UK, Australia, among others. "Big Casino" and "Always Be" charted in Canada and the UK. With the release of a music video for "Big Casino", the band toured the US until the end of the year. "Always Be" was released as a single in December; the group had a support slot for the Foo Fighters and went on a tour of Europe and Japan in early 2008. With the single release of "Let It Happen", the band went on a co-headlining US tour with Paramore, and appeared at various festivals in Europe.

== Background and recording ==
Jimmy Eat World released their fifth album Futures in October 2004. It charted at number 6 on the US Billboard 200, and would later be certified gold in the US by the RIAA. The album was promoted with headlining stints in the US, Europe and Japan, followed by a co-headlining US tour with Taking Back Sunday, and a support slot for Green Day in the UK and the US, leading into October 2005. That same month, outtakes from the Futures sessions were released as part of the Stay on My Side Tonight EP. Following the EP's release, vocalist/guitarist Jim Adkins revealed they were working on new songs. In December, the band supported Green Day on an Australian tour. In January 2006, drummer Zach Lind said the band resumed work on new material, and by February they had seven demos. Recording for Chase This Light began in August 2006, the band entered the studio with 17 songs.

Despite initial reporting that said Butch Vig would travel from Madison, Wisconsin to work with the band in Tempe, Arizona, he ended up in a consultant-esque role. Sessions were held at Unit 2 in Tempe with engineer Chris Testa; the band handled additional recording. Ross Hogarth and Fields did additional engineering at Seedy Underbelly in Los Angeles, California. A string session was held at Conway Studios in Los Angeles for "Gotta Be Somebody's Blues", arranged and conducted by David Campbell. Vig appeared a few times in person throughout the sessions, while the group mainly worked with Testa. The band posted material on a website for Vig to listen to and provided feedback on. Subsequently, the band and Testa earned a split producer credit; John Fields co-produced "Here It Goes" and did additional production on "Big Casino", "Let It Happen", "Always Be", "Electable (Give It Up)", "Feeling Lucky" and "Dizzy".

Recording lasted for three weeks until late August, when the band took a break to play shows in the US and Europe. Sessions recommenced on September 4 and lasted until October. Further recording took place in December, when they recorded Amy Ross of Nowhere Man and a Whiskey Girl doing vocals. The band took a break around the Christmas period to write additional songs, and recorded more material during a few weeks in March 2007. Following this, the band embarked on a European tour, which concluded in May. The sessions finished later in the month, with mixing being done by Chris Lord-Alge the following month at Resonate Music in Burbank California with assistance from Keith Armstrong. Ted Jensen mastered the final recordings at Sterling Sound in New York City. Linton would later remark that they "might have gone a little bit too crazy on some of the production parts, like as far as adding more vocals and keyboard parts."

== Composition ==
Musically, the sound of Chase This Light has been described as pop punk, pop rock and power pop, with influence from pop, moving away from the emo style of their earlier work. Adkins and Linton's guitar work earned comparisons to early 1980s rock acts, such as the Outfield and U2. In contrast to Futures darker sound, Chase This Light was more melodic and upbeat. The opening song "Big Casino" channeled "When You Were Young" by the Killers. Adkins referred to it as a "loser anthem" for people who burn-out and desire success. He got the title phrase from a short story by Richard Ford where two of the characters are talking and one of them says "He's big casino." The pop punk number "Let It Happen" is aided by additional vocals from Ross. Adkins wrote it as a "feigning strength as a defense"-type track. "Always Be" utilizes finger snaps and handclaps; its melody was compared to the Shins and Shout Out Louds. It discuses co-dependency, alongside exploited weaknesses.

"Carry You" originated as a track from Adkins' side project Go Big Casino. Its acoustic guitars evoked the Futures song "Kill"; Fields contributes keyboard. Talking about the song, Adkins said that with "distance and time, it becomes easier to invent qualities that may not have existed in a relationship." "Electable (Give It Up)" is a political punk track that uses synthesizers in the vein of the Killers. Adkins wrote it in anger in regards to the "lack of intelligent political discourse in America." The song features additional vocals from Ross, Finn and Jackson Adkins, and Ava Lind, as well as additional bass from Fields. "Gotta Be Somebody's Blues" is a dark song with strings that returned to the sound of Futures. The track talked about apathy and defending one's own beliefs.

The tambourine-enhanced power pop song "Feeling Lucky" recalled "That Thing You Do!" by the Wonders, and the All-American Rejects. Adkins said it was "[a]nother loser anthem" about a bar fight. "Here It Goes", which features handclaps, manipulated vocals, synthesizers and dance beats. Ross added additional vocals, and Fields provided keyboard to it. It talks about not losing focus on what is important to a person. Adkins said "Chase This Light" is about being "self-aware in the middle of a special experience", with the chase part being about "trying to find that feeling of discovery." It echoes the melancholic atmosphere of "Work" from Futures and "For Me This Is Heaven" from their third studio album Clarity (1999). "Firefight" was reminiscent of the band's early records with its punk rock and post-hardcore guitars; it talks about new things coming across as important. "Dizzy" is stylistically similar to Hysteria (19)-era Def Lappard, as well as "My Sundown" from their fourth studio album Bleed American (2001), and includes keyboard from Fields and Stephen Lu. "Dizzy" is about awkwardness between two individuals when dealing with their past. After finishing the album, the group felt that by having two slow tracks would alter the album's dynamic; as a result, "Gotta Be Somebody's Blues" remained, while "Be Sensible" became a bonus track. The latter comes across as a more melodic iteration of "Hear You Me", a track from Bleed American.

== Release ==
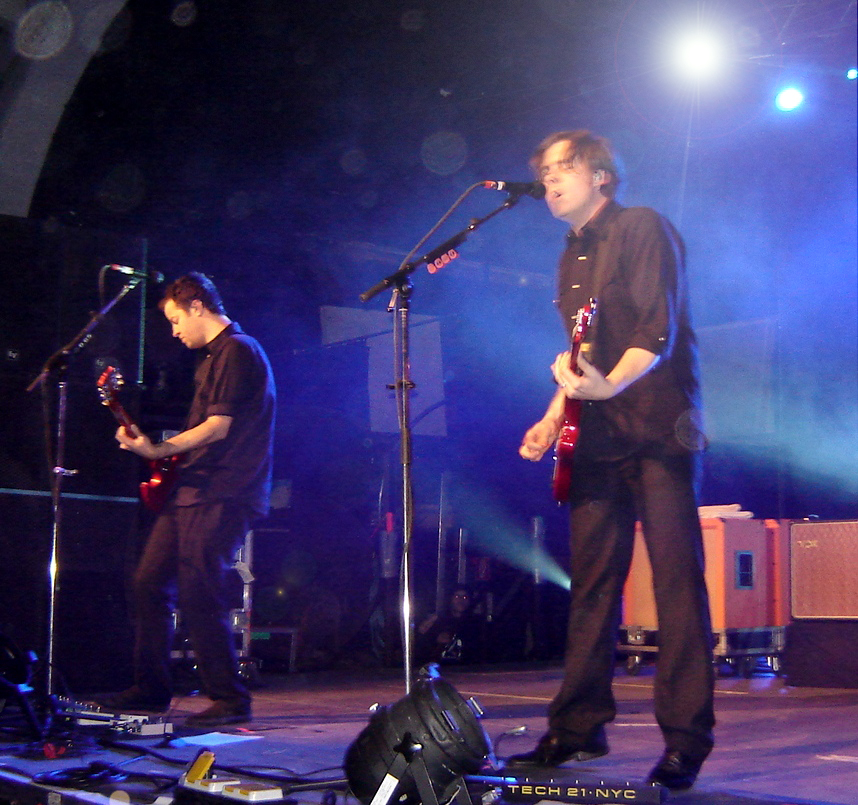
Jimmy Eat World performing live in 2008.

In July 2007, the band went on a tour of the US, before doing several shows in South Africa as well as appearing at several festival dates in Europe the following month. On July 30, Chase This Light was announced for release in three months' time; the track listing was posted on August 15. "Big Casino", the first single from the album, was released August 28 for download. Two versions were released on vinyl: one featuring "Beautiful Is", and the second one featuring "Open Bar Reception". The album's artwork was released the following day, taken by Davies and Starr. It drew comparison to the cover of Apple Venus Volume 1 (1999) by XTC. In mid-September, a music video was filmed for "Big Casino", which starred the band performing in a wasteland. From here until the album's release, the group went on a North American tour, which included an appearance at the X96 Big Ass Show radio festival. Chase This Light was released on October 16 through Interscope. The iTunes edition included the Bruce Springsteen cover "Take 'Em as They Come", alongside an acoustic version of "Dizzy". The UK version included "Be Sensible" and "Distraction" as bonus tracks, while the Japanese version included both of these, with the addition of "Beautiful Is".

The "Big Casino" music video was released on October 24. Following this, the band embarked on an east coast US tour in October and November 2007 with Maritime. On November 9, the band performed two songs on The Sauce. "Always Be" was released to radio on December 4; the vinyl version included a live version of "Big Casino", while the CD version featured the Tempe Sessions version of "Firefight". Throughout December, the band appeared at various radio festivals. In January 2008, the band supported Foo Fighters on a few US shows. A music video for "Always Be" was released on January 29. From late January to early March, the band went on a European tour. The shows from 28 January (Brussels) through 22 February (Leeds) were supported by Sparkadia, while the later dates were supported by Styrofoam.

On March 5, an acoustic version of "Always Be" was released online. Following this, the band toured Japan. On March 25, the video album Tempe Sessions was released through the iTunes Store. It featured live-in-the-studio performances of tracks from the album, in addition to interviews on the making of the album. "Let It Happen" was released to radio on April 8. Bookended by appearances at the Bamboozle Left and The Bamboozle festivals, the group embarked on a co-headlining US tour with Paramore in April and May with support from Dear and the Headlights. Throughout June, the band performed at Download Festival, Rock am Ring, Rock im Park, Hultsfred and Norwegian Wood festivals, alongside headlining shows in Germany. They followed this with a North America tour in July with Dear and the Headlights. In 2013, an iTunes Sessions EP was released, which featured a rendition of "Chase This Light".

== Reception ==
Professional ratings
Aggregate scores
Source	Rating
Metacritic	66/100
Review scores
Source	Rating
AllMusic	3/5 stars
Entertainment Weekly	A
LAS Magazine	7.6/10
NME	7/10
PopMatters	5/10 stars
Rolling Stone	3/5 stars
Slant Magazine	3.5/5 stars
Spin	7/10
Ultimate Guitar	8/10
Virgin Media	3/5 stars

Chase This Light received generally positive reviews from music critics. At Metacritic, which assigns a normalized rating out of 100 to reviews from mainstream critics, the album received an average score of 66, based on 25 reviews. Andy Greenwald from Entertainment Weekly gave praise to the band for combining the "extroverted guitar pop" of Bleed American and the pensive bulk of Futures to encapsulate what their given genre is: "big emotions, sure, but also big hooks, big stakes. And big rewards." He concluded by calling Chase This Light "a master class in hard rocking for the soft-hearted." Slant Magazine's Jonathan Keefe called it "a return to form for the band in terms of their ingratiating power-pop", praising the tracks "Big Casino" and "Always Be" for their instantly catchy instrumentation and melodies that make up the overall tone of the album. He added that "it isn't a stretch to say that Chase This Light is one of the year’s best power-pop records." Spin journalist Andrew Beaujon praised Jim Adkins' vocal delivery for having a "youthful tang" that sells the songs about "getting older and maybe a little more cynical." He concluded that "[T]he joy of Chase This Light is hearing him convince us that it comes back again, too."

AllMusic editor Tim Sendra was ambivalent towards the record, commending the return to Bleed American material that's made up of "rousing anthems ("Big Casino")", "melancholy rockers with singalong choruses ("Chase This Light")" and "sweet ballads ("Dizzy")" but was critical of the dry and airless production, the vocals sounding passionless and the unimaginative lyricism, saying that its "nice to listen to and vaguely uplifting, but ultimately empty on the inside." He concluded that "Jimmy Eat World have proven they can do better than this and they may yet, but this album is a bit of a disappointment." Andrew Blackie of PopMatters was also disappointed with the album coming across as "a weaker, limper version" of Futures, criticizing producer Butch Vig for making the band sound "processed and sterile" and the lyrical content for being "juvenile and sapped in self-important, happy-go-lucky sentiments." He concluded that "[M]ore disappointing than that, though, is the fact that there is hardly anything groundbreaking to be found in Chase This Light's 40 minutes, which is less than we’ve come to expect from this band."

Chase This Light debuted at number five on the US Billboard 200 chart, selling around 62,000 copies in its first week, making it the band's highest-charting album in the United States. It appeared on various component charts: number 2 on Alternative Albums and Tastemaker Albums, and number 3 on Top Rock Albums. It reached number 11 in Canada, number 27 in the UK, number 28 in Scotland, number 30 in Australia, number 54 in Germany, number 73 in Austria, and number 94 in Switzerland. "Big Casino" charted at number 3 on Alternative Airplay, and number 22 on Bubbling Under Hot 100. It also reached number 59 on Canadian Hot 100, and number 119 in the UK. "Always Be" charted at number 14 on Alternative Airplay, and also reached number 37 in the UK.

== Track listing ==
All songs written by Jimmy Eat World.

No.	Title	Length
1.	"Big Casino"	3:40
2.	"Let It Happen"	3:25
3.	"Always Be"	3:04
4.	"Carry You"	4:22
5.	"Electable (Give It Up)"	2:56
6.	"Gotta Be Somebody's Blues"	4:46
7.	"Feeling Lucky"	2:32
8.	"Here It Goes"	3:26
9.	"Chase This Light"	3:29
10.	"Firefight"	3:53
11.	"Dizzy"	4:46
Total length:		40:18

Japanese edition
No.	Title	Length
12.	"Be Sensible"	5:05
13.	"Distraction"	2:58
14.	"Beautiful Is"	2:30
Total length:		50:51

== Personnel ==
Adapted credits from the booklet of Chase This Light.

Jimmy Eat World

- Jim Adkins – lead vocals, guitar
- Tom Linton – guitar
- Zach Lind – drums
- Rick Burch – bass

Additional musicians

- Amy Ross – additional vocals (tracks 2, 5 and 8)
- Finn Adkins – additional vocals (track 5)
- Jackson Adkins – additional vocals (track 5)
- Ava Lind – additional vocals (track 5)
- John Fields – keyboard (tracks 4, 8 and 11), additional bass (track 5)
- Stephen Lu – keyboard (track 11)
- David Campbell – string arrangement, conductor (track 6)

Production

- Butch Vig – executive producer
- Jimmy Eat World – producer, additional recording
- Chris Testa – producer, recording
- John Fields – co-producer (track 8), additional production (tracks 1–3, 5, 7 and 11), additional engineer
- Ross Hogarth – additional engineer
- Chris Lord-Alge – mixing
- Keith Armstrong – assistant
- Ted Jensen – mastering
- Morning Breath Inc. – art direction, design
- Davies and Starr – cover photography
- Jason Odell – band photography

== Charts ==
Chart performance
Chart (2007)	Peak position
Australian Albums (ARIA)	30
Austrian Albums (Ö3 Austria)	73
Canadian Albums (Billboard)	11
German Albums (Offizielle Top 100)	54
Irish Albums (IRMA)	56
Japanese Albums (Oricon)	39
Scottish Albums (Official Charts)	28
Swiss Albums (Schweizer Hitparade)	94
UK Albums (Official Charts)	27
US Billboard 200	5
US Indie Store Album Sales (Billboard)	2
US Top Alternative Albums (Billboard)	2
US Top Rock Albums (Billboard)	3
