= Invented (album) =

Studio album by Jimmy Eat World
- Released: September 28, 2010
- Studio: Unit 2; Mark Trombino's house; Capitol
- Genre: Power pop
- Length: 50:54
- Label: DGC, Interscope
- Producer: Jimmy Eat World, Mark Trombino

Jimmy Eat World chronology
Chase This Light (2007)	Invented (2010)	Damage (2013)

Singles from Invented
- 1. "My Best Theory" Released: August 10, 2010; 2. "Coffee and Cigarettes" Released: November 23, 2010

Invented is the seventh studio album by American rock band Jimmy Eat World. Following the release of Chase This Light (2007), frontman Jim Adkins began a writing exercise that involved writing about photographs, which would serve as the lyrical basis for their next album. Recorded primarily at the band's home-based studio, the sessions were co-produced by Mark Trombino. Described as a power pop album, it featured guest vocals from Courtney Marie Andrews and Rachel Haden. Several of the songs earned comparisons to Foo Fighters, the Offspring, and Rites of Spring, among others.

Preceded by the release of "My Best Theory" in August 2010, Invented appeared on September 28, through DGC and Interscope Records. It was met with a favorable reaction from music critics, with comments on the album's production and the band's musicianship. Invented charted at number 11 on the US Billboard 200, and appeared on two other component charts. It reached the top 30 in Australia, Canada, and the UK. It was promoted with tours of the US and Europe, prior to the single release of "Coffee and Cigarettes" in November. Throughout 2011, the group performed in the US, Japan, Australia and Europe.

== Background ==
Jimmy Eat World released their sixth album Chase This Light in October 2007. It peaked at number five on the US Billboard 200 chart, and was promoted with tours of the US, Europe and Japan, followed by a co-headlining US tour with Paramore. By June 2008, bassist Rick Burch said they were working several new ideas. Around this time, frontman Jim Adkins started a writing exercise in which he viewed photographs and wrote his own back stories for them. He spent around 10 minutes looking at every aspect of the photograph and writing his impressions. "Later on in the day, I would be working on my own songs, and some of the more interesting parts of those writing sessions started creeping in", Adkins said.

Adkins said that around 85–90% of the album's lyrics stem from this writing experiment and that Cindy Sherman's Completely Untitled Film Still series and Hannah Starkey's Photographs 1997–2007 were key influences. In August 2008, drummer Zach Lind said the band was expected to be working on the new album imminently. While working on this new material, the band embarked upon a 10-year anniversary tour for their third album, Clarity (1999). Adkins said the trek had no influence on the forthcoming material but acted as an "overall confidence booster".

== Production ==
When making demos for their next album, guitarist Tom Linton said they purposely wanted to take a more stripped down approach, compared to the heavily produced nature of Chase This Light. While on the anniversary tour, the band became reacquainted with Clarity producer Mark Trombino and decided to work with him once again for their forthcoming album. Trombino's involvement was made public in September 2009 when the band announced that they were working on a "batch of songs" with him. The band subsequently began recording tracks at their home studio and rehearsal space, Unit 2 in Tempe, Arizona. They would then send them to Trombino, who was located in California; he contributed parts to the recordings.

Adkins remarked that Trombino would make a "mix of it and add production ideas and we would just kind of go back and forth like that. [He] is the wizard at computers, ... [and due to the band's history with him,] it made sense on the familiarity level and the ease of working level". Although the band and Trombino spent little time together in the studio, Trombino joined Jimmy Eat World on a couple of occasions. The strings for "Heart Is Hard to Find" and "Littlething" were recorded by Wesley Seidman at Capitol Studios, assisted by Paul Smith. Regarding the overall recording process, Adkins stated: "It frees up a lot of our geographic restrictions for both the producer and the band; it's not just someone next door." In March 2010, the band had finished mixing the album.

== Composition ==
Musically, the sound of Invented has been described as power pop. While it has also been tagged as emo, it was noted that the band moved away from the style. Singer-songwriter Courtney Marie Andrews provided guest vocals for five of the album's tracks, namely "Heart Is Hard to Find", "Movielike", "Coffee and Cigarettes", "Cut", and "Invented". Adkins, who met Andrews through mutual friends in Phoenix, Arizona, stated that she is "very versatile; she can sing really high. ... There’s a few spots on the record that I knew I wanted a female vocal. ... I put her to work on some other things that I thought might be interesting to get more voices in there". Andrews subsequently joined the band on tour, with Adkins stating, "There's female vocals on most of our records, so it's nice to have that represented live. ... It's nice having her around to cover the higher stuff that I don’t normally do live." The strings for "Heart Is Hard to Find" and "Littlething" were arranged and conducted by David Campbell. They consist of violinists Josephina Vergara, Gerardo Hilara, Tammy Hatwan and Michele Richards, and celloist Steve Richards.

Adkins states that each song is its own "closed narrative", remarking that the album's title Invented referred to a track that he felt "sums up the mood here, but could also be taken more literally as this album is the deepest into character writing we have tried so far". The opening track "Heart Is Hard to Find" consists of handclaps, acoustic guitar and orchestral flourishes. "My Best Theory" uses dissonant rhythms; it was reminiscent of "Gone Away" by the Offspring, and the Smashing Pumpkins. Adkins said it talks about "finding your individuality in a world where extremes are more and more presented as your only option".

The Foo Fighters-esque "Evidence" comes across as a mid-tempo iteration of "Big Casino" from Chase This Light. "Higher Devotion" is a dark disco track with industrial guitar sounds, synthesizers played by Doug Borrmann, and Adkins channeling Prince. The mid-tempo number "Movielike" discusses the reality of living in a big city. "Coffee and Cigarettes" is a coming-of-age song about life post-education and features references to Otis Redding and Grateful Dead. "Stop" is a ballad that sees Adkins duetting with Rachel Haden; the song dates back to 2006, when the band was writing material for Chase This Light. "Littlething" is a mid-tempo song with strings and Clarity-esque xylophones.

"Cut" opens with infrequent guitar strumming, accompanied by an organ and echo-enhanced drums. Linton wrote and sang lead vocals on "Action Needs an Audience", marking his first lead vocal appearance in eleven years. Adkins said the track's music had been "sitting around for a long time" and he was unable to come up with lyrics for it. As Linton was "always championing" the song, the band "decided that he should take a crack at writing lyrics for it then". The track channels the band's punk roots, in the vein of Fugazi and Rites of Spring, and came across as a rehash of Clarity song "Your New Aesthetic".

Journalist Alex Rice felt that it evoked the sound of the band's second studio album Static Prevails (1996), namely with its lyrics in the vein of "Robot Factory", and Adkins's backing vocals recalling those heard in "Rockstar" and "Episode IV". The penultimate title track lasted for seven minutes and evoked the sound of Clarity tracks "Table for Glasses" and "For Me This Is Heaven". The demo version features Adkins on drums; the first half of the final version consists of Adkins's drumming, while the remainder is Lind. It has been compared to the softer songs of the Smashing Pumpkins. The closing track "Mixtape" was six-and-a-half minutes long and featured piano. The narrator talks about rewinding the demise of his relationship with his ex, in the manner of a cassette tape. Electronic drum clicks were heard in the background; during the outro, horns accompany Adkins's electronically altered vocals.

== Release ==
On July 14, 2010, Invented was announced for release in September; followed by the artwork on July 20 and the track listing on July 22. On August 10, 2010, "My Best Theory" was released as a single, and it was released to radio on August 17. Invented was made available for streaming on September 21 on the band's Myspace profile. On September 24, the group performed on The Late Show with David Letterman. That same day, the music video for "My Best Theory" premiered on Vevo, directed by Ron Winter. Adkins said the band thought that a "science fiction approach would be a great way to demonstrate breaking free of what may be expected from an individual".

The following day, the band appeared at the Virgin Mobile Festival. Invented was released on September 28 through DGC and Interscope Records. The iTunes deluxe version included "You and I" (Wilco cover), "Precision Auto" (Superchunk cover), acoustic versions of "Coffee and Cigarettes" and "Mixtape", and a demo version of "Anais". The Japanese version featured the studio version of "Anais".

The group embarked on a US headlining tour in September and October, on which they were accompanied by Andrews. The band were supported by Civil Twilight and We Were Promised Jetpacks. On October 29, the band performed "My Best Theory" on The Tonight Show with Jay Leno. It was followed by a European tour in November with Minus the Bear. "Coffee and Cigarettes" was released to radio on November 23. Throughout December, the band played various radio festivals, and appeared on Conan, where they performed "Coffee and Cigarettes". In January and February 2011, the band went on a headlining US with support from David Bazan. In March and April, the band toured Japan and Australia. They went on another headlining US tour in May and June. Following this, the group appeared at Glastonbury Festival in the UK, and played festivals across Europe, Japan and the US in July and August.

== Reception ==
Professional ratings
Aggregate scores
Source	Rating
Metacritic	68/100
Review scores
Source	Rating
AllMusic	2.5/5 stars
Alternative Press	3.5/5 stars
The A.V. Club	B+
Kerrang!	KKKK
NME	4/10
PopMatters	7/10 stars
Punknews.org	2.5/5 stars
Rock Sound	8/10
Rolling Stone	2.5/5 stars
Spin	6/10

Invented received positive reviews from most music critics. Sampling sixteen reviews, the review aggregator website Metacritic gave the album a weighted average score of 68, indicating "generally favorable reviews".

Kyle Ryan of The A.V. Club was favorable in his review, writing that the "songs boast huge-sounding guitars, like “Evidence,” “Invented,” and “My Best Theory,” whose thick fuzz recalls Smashing Pumpkins. But the seven-minute “Invented” spends more time exploring a sparser mood, as does the six-minute-plus closer, “Mixtape”. In the end, Jimmy Eat World strikes a balance between its basics (big guitars and catchy sing-alongs) and the musical growth of the past 16 years. Invented is less a return to form than a compendium of what Jimmy Eat World does so well."

BBC Music journalist Mike Haydock also praised the album, writing, "Jimmy Eat World have always been sentimental: they tug on the heart strings with yearning melodies that pound you into snivelling submission. But, crucially, they also know how to rock out. The acoustic guitars on opener "Heart Is Hard to Find" sound crisp and vital; "Coffee and Cigarettes"’ plain melody is driven forward by bringing the bass up high in the mix; and, best of all, "Evidence" broods menacingly before exploding into a glorious burst of distortion." Joshua Khan of Blare magazine said that the album "proves age is simply a number that doesn't force a group to falter but instead reinvents nostalgic butterflies and shapes an acoustic ballad destined to be the next stand-in-the-rain love plea".

Ben Patashnik of Rock Sound noted the "varnished" production, making it "hard to fall in love with until repeated listens unleash its true charms". However, he also added, "‘Coffee And Cigarettes’ and the title track slowly uncurl themselves over the course of a few days and before you know it, it feels like Jimmy Eat World never went away." Sputnikmusic staff writer Mike Stagno explained, "Invented reins in Jimmy Eat World after Chase This Light. It still possesses the same inviting, feel-good sentiment, but it's expressed more personably, and in this regard it makes for a very rewarding listen." British rock magazine Kerrang! opined, "Invented is a return to the creative peaks of yore. It's a record rich with twinkling sonic subtleties, timeless melodies and characteristically layered, epic tunes."

Andrew Leahey of AllMusic critiqued, "Invented, as tuneful as it may be, still plays an odd role in Jimmy Eat World's discography, since it can't quite figure out how to transcend a genre - one that Jimmy Eat World helped invent." Spin magazine writer Mikael Wood said "even the amped-up standouts (like "Coffee and Cigarettes") are beginning to feel a bit by the numbers." Jonathan Keefe of Slant magazine bemoaned its mastering, stating, "Unfortunately, Invented is yet another album to have lost the so-called loudness war. Every element of the album, from the lead guitars right down to the female harmony vocals on the title track, is pitched to be as loud as everything else, and the result is suffocating." Ash Dosanjh of NME said that the album "certainly doesn't veer very far from their past emotional sensibilities".

Invented sold 34,594 units in the United States during its opening week, charting at number 11 on the Billboard 200. It appeared on other Billboard component charts: number two on Alternative Albums, and number three on Rock Albums. Outside of the US, it reached number 21 in Australia and Canada, and number 29 in the UK. "My Best Theory" charted at number 2 on Alternative Airplay, number 9 on Hot Rock & Alternative Songs and Rock Airplay and number 14 on Bubbling Under Hot 100. "Coffee and Cigarettes" charted at number 23 on Alternative Airplay. Kerrang! included the album on their list of the top 20 albums of the year.

== Track listing ==
All songs written by Jimmy Eat World.

No.	Title	Length
1.	"Heart Is Hard to Find"	3:18
2.	"My Best Theory"	3:23
3.	"Evidence"	4:41
4.	"Higher Devotion"	3:02
5.	"Movielike"	3:47
6.	"Coffee and Cigarettes"	3:45
7.	"Stop"	3:39
8.	"Littlething"	4:07
9.	"Cut"	4:57
10.	"Action Needs an Audience"	2:40
11.	"Invented"	7:07
12.	"Mixtape"	6:31
Total length:		50:54

Deluxe edition
No.	Title	Length
13.	"You and I" (Wilco cover)	3:19
14.	"Coffee and Cigarettes" (acoustic)	3:45
15.	"Precision Auto" (Superchunk cover)	2:43
16.	"Anais" (demo)	3:19
17.	"Mixtape" (acoustic)	3:16

Japanese edition
No.	Title	Length
13.	"Anais"	3:36

== Personnel ==
The following personnel contributed to Invented:

Jimmy Eat World

- Jim Adkins – lead vocals, guitar, recording
- Rick Burch – bass guitar
- Zach Lind – drums
- Tom Linton – guitar, lead vocals on "Action Needs An Audience"

Additional musicians

- Courtney Marie Andrews – guest vocals (tracks 1, 5, 6, 9, and 11)
- Rachel Haden – guest vocals (track 7)
- Doug Borrmann – synthesizers (track 4)
- Josephina Vergara – violin (track 1 and 8)
- Gerardo Hilara – violin (tracks 1 and 8)
- Tammy Hatwan – violin (tracks 1 and 8)
- Michele Richards – violin (tracks 1 and 8)
- Steve Richards – cello (tracks 1 and 8)

Production

- Jimmy Eat World – producer
- Mark Trombino – producer, mixing, additional recording
- Ted Jensen – mastering
- David Campbell – string arranger, conductor (tracks 1 and 8)
- Wesley Seidman – strings recording
- Paul Smith – assistant
- Morning Breath Inc. – art direction, design
- Ken Schles – photography

== Charts ==
Chart performance
Chart (2010)	Peak position
Australian Albums (ARIA)	21
Austrian Albums (Ö3 Austria)	67
Belgian Heatseekers Albums (Ultratop Flanders)	11
Canadian Albums (Billboard)	21
Canadian Alternative Albums (Jam!)	5
German Albums (Offizielle Top 100)	44
Irish Albums (IRMA)	50
Japanese Albums (Oricon)	40
Scottish Albums (OCC)	31
Swiss Albums (Schweizer Hitparade)	73
UK Albums (OCC)	29
US Billboard 200	11
US Indie Store Album Sales (Billboard)	2
US Top Alternative Albums (Billboard)	2
US Top Rock Albums (Billboard)	3
