= Chase This Light (song) =

Song by Jimmy Eat World

from the album Chase This Light
- Released: October 16, 2007
- Recorded: 2006–2007
- Genre: Alternative rock, pop rock
- Length: 3:29
- Label: Interscope
- Songwriter(s): Jim Adkins, Rick Burch, Zach Lind, Tom Linton
- Producer(s): Jimmy Eat World, Chris Testa, Butch Vig

"Chase This Light" is the ninth track on Jimmy Eat World's sixth album, Chase This Light. It was never released as a single, but it did chart on the Pop 100, peaking at 99.

== Reception ==
Virgin Media calls "Chase This Light", "heartfelt and uplifting", citing its melancholy.

== Charts ==
Chart (2007)	Peak position
US Billboard Pop 100	99

== Appearances in popular media ==
"Chase This Light" has been used on station promos for TNT.
