= I Will Steal You Back =

Single by Jimmy Eat World

from the album Damage
- Released: April 16, 2013
- Recorded: 2012
- Genre: Alternative rock; power pop
- Length: 3:29
- Label: RCA
- Songwriters: Jim Adkins; Rick Burch; Zach Lind; Tom Linton
- Producer: Alain Johannes

Jimmy Eat World singles chronology
"Coffee and Cigarettes" (2011)	"I Will Steal You Back" (2013)	"Damage" (2013)

"I Will Steal You Back" is the lead single from Jimmy Eat World's eighth studio album Damage. It was released on April 16, 2013, and impacted radio the same day.

== Chart performance ==
"I Will Steal You Back" debuted at #37 on the Billboard Alternative Songs Chart.

Chart performance for "I Will Steal You Back"
Chart (2013)	Peak position
Czech Republic (Modern Rock)	6
US Alternative Airplay (Billboard)	23
