= Damage (Jimmy Eat World song) =

Single by Jimmy Eat World

from the album Damage
- Released: August 6, 2013
- Recorded: 2012
- Genre: Alternative rock; emo
- Label: RCA
- Songwriter(s): Jim Adkins; Rick Burch; Zach Lind; Tom Linton
- Producer(s): Alain Johannes

Jimmy Eat World singles chronology
"I Will Steal You Back" (2013)	"Damage" (2013)	"Sure and Certain" (2016)

Damage is a song by Jimmy Eat World, included on their album, Damage (2013).

A two-track 7-inch single was first released on April 20, 2013 as a Record Store Day exclusive. Side A contains the title track "Damage" from the band's eighth studio album Damage. Side B features Jimmy Eat World's cover version of Radiohead's song "Stop Whispering". Only 1,800 copies of the EP were pressed (1,500 in the US and 300 internationally). The song impacted radio on August 6, 2013.

== Track listing ==
All songs written by Jimmy Eat World, except where noted.

1. "Damage"
2. "Stop Whispering" (Radiohead cover)

== Charts ==
2013 weekly chart performance for "Damage"
Chart (2013)	Peak position
US Hot Singles Sales (Billboard)	6
