= Stay on My Side Tonight =

EP by Jimmy Eat World
- Released: October 4, 2005
- Recorded: 2005
- Studio: Ocean Studios, with additional Recording at Unit 2 in Tempe, Arizona (first three tracks)
- Genre: Jangle pop
- Length: 27:19
- Label: Interscope
- Producer: Jimmy Eat World and Mark Trombino

Jimmy Eat World chronology
Futures (2004)	Stay on My Side Tonight (2005)	Chase This Light (2007)

Stay on My Side Tonight is a five-track EP released by American rock band Jimmy Eat World through downloads on September 13, 2005 and physically released on October 4, 2005. It consists of three unreleased songs, a cover of the Heatmiser song "Half Right", and a remix of the Futures track "Drugs or Me". The title of the album is taken from a line in the song "Disintegration", the EP's opening track.

== Reception ==
Professional ratings
Review scores
Source	Rating
AllMusic	3/5 stars
IGN	6.5/10
LAS Magazine	7/10

Stay on My Side Tonight received a positive review from Tim Sendra of AllMusic, who praised the three outtakes as possibly better than Futures and with "more life and power than one might expect", but calling the other tracks "interesting but not vital". IGN's Chris Carle rated the release a 6.5 out of 10, with reverse preferences: he wrote that the remix is the best song on the EP and the first three tracks "glide by forgettably, awash in a sea of jangly, same-sounding guitar riffs".

== Track listing ==
All songs written by Jimmy Eat World, except where noted.

1. "Disintegration" – 7:44
2. "Over" – 3:46
3. "Closer" – 5:51
4. "Half Right" (Heatmiser cover, written by Elliott Smith) – 4:43
5. "Drugs or Me" (Styrofoam remix) – 5:15

== Personnel ==
Jimmy Eat World

- Jim Adkins – lead vocals; lead guitar; engineering on "Disintegration", "Over", "Closer", and "Half Right"; production on "Disintegration", "Over", and "Closer"; layout
- Rick Burch – bass guitar; backing vocals; production on "Disintegration", "Over", and "Closer"; layout
- Zach Lind – drums; production on "Disintegration", "Over", and "Closer"; layout
- Tom Linton – rhythm guitar; backing vocals; production on "Disintegration", "Over", and "Closer"; layout

Other personnel

- Jason Cupp – assistant engineering on "Disintegration", "Over", and "Closer"
- Chris Fudurich – mixing on "Disintegration", "Over", "Closer", and "Half Right"
- Tony Hajjar – percussion on "Disintegration"
- Dan Monick – photography
- Mark Trombino – engineering and production on "Disintegration", "Over", and "Closer"; percussion on "Disintegration"
- Roger Seibel – mastering
- Styrofoam – remixing on "Drugs or Me"
- Liam Ward – layout

== Charts ==
Chart performance for Stay on My Side Tonight
Chart (2005)	Peak position
Australia (ARIA)	74
