= Coffee and Cigarettes (song) =

Single by Jimmy Eat World

from the album Invented
- Released: February 25, 2011
- Recorded: 2010
- Genre: Alternative rock; emo; power pop
- Length: 3:46
- Label: Interscope
- Songwriter(s): Jim Adkins; Rick Burch; Zach Lind; Tom Linton
- Producer(s): Mark Trombino

Jimmy Eat World singles chronology
"My Best Theory" (2010)	"Coffee and Cigarettes" (2011)	"I Will Steal You Back" (2013)

"Coffee and Cigarettes" is the second single from Jimmy Eat World's seventh studio album, Invented. The song was played on the radio on November 23, 2010. This is one of the five Invented tracks where singer-songwriter Courtney Marie Andrews provides guest vocals.

== Reception ==
Rock Sound suggests that "Coffee and Cigarettes" takes several listens to unleash its "true charm", saying "'Coffee And Cigarettes' and the title track slowly uncurl themselves over the course of a few days" and that it feels as if Jimmy Eat World never went away. Punknews.org praises the song for its "simple yet effective chorus" that is more memorable than most songs on the album, but criticizes the synth in the song. Eric Magnuson of Rolling Stone also cited the song's chorus in its review of Invented, describing it as "big, singalong" and able to "keep a teenager engaged for a couple of days." BBC Music's Mike Haydock underlines producer Mark Trombino's work, bringing "back the sparkle to songs that could have died on their backsides" as the track's "plain melody is driven forward by bringing the bass up high in the mix."

== Live performances ==
"Coffee and Cigarettes" was performed on Conan on December 13, 2010, with guest vocalist Ian Moore.

== Personnel ==
The following personnel contributed to "Coffee and Cigarettes":

Jimmy Eat World

- Jim Adkins – lead vocals, guitar, recording
- Rick Burch – bass guitar
- Zach Lind – drums
- Tom Linton – guitar

Additional musicians

- Courtney Marie Andrews – guest vocals

Production

- Jimmy Eat World – producer
- Mark Trombino – producer, mixing, additional recording
- Ted Jensen – mastering
- Morning Breath Inc. – art direction, design
- Ken Schles – photography

== Charts ==
Chart	Peak position
US Alternative Airplay (Billboard)	23
