= Always Be =

Single by Jimmy Eat World

from the album Chase This Light
- Released: December 4, 2007 (United States); March 3, 2008 (United Kingdom)
- Recorded: 2007
- Length: 3:04
- Label: Interscope
- Songwriters: Jim Adkins; Rick Burch; Zach Lind; Tom Linton
- Producer: Butch Vig

Jimmy Eat World singles chronology
"Big Casino" (2007)	"Always Be" (2007)	"My Best Theory" (2010)

"Always Be" is the second single from Jimmy Eat World's sixth studio album Chase This Light. The song impacted radio on December 4, 2007. The single was released in the U.K on March 3, 2008.

== Critical reception ==
Slant Magazine's Jonathan Keefe praised the song's use of "snaps and handclaps" and compared its melody to the highlights on both The Shins' Wincing the Night Away and Shout Out Louds' Our Ill Wills. In a negative review for the album, Andrew Blackie from PopMatters criticized the track for being "gimmicky and insincere."

== Music video ==
The band began filming the video on January 5, 2008. A 30-second clip was soon added to Jimmy Eat World's official website, as well as the clip being shown on MTV Two, and then on January 27, it was announced the video would premiere on MTV TRL on January 30 at 3.30pm.

The video follows a school trip to a science museum which mainly focuses on a boy and girl who come to like each other by the end of the video. As the band plays, the two find themselves separated from their tour group and run around the museum, playing with the displays until they catch up with the rest of their classmates.

The full video is now available to watch on YouTube and download on iTunes. It was directed by the Malloys. The video was filmed at the Natural History Museum in Los Angeles, California.

== Track listing ==
iTunes EP

1. "Always Be"
2. "Firefight" (Tempe Sessions)
3. "Big Casino" (live)
4. "Always Be" (live)

7" Vinyl

1. "Always Be"
2. "Big Casino" (live)

CD

1. "Always Be"
2. "Firefight" (Tempe Sessions)

== Charts ==
Chart	Peak position
UK Singles Chart	37
US Billboard Modern Rock Tracks	14
