= Pop Is Dead =

1993 single by Radiohead

Single by Radiohead
- Released: 10 May 1993
- Genre: Alternative rock
- Length: 2:10
- Label: Parlophone; EMI
- Songwriters: Thom Yorke; Colin Greenwood; Jonny Greenwood; Philip Selway; Ed O'Brien
- Producers: Jim Warren; Radiohead

Radiohead singles chronology
"Anyone Can Play Guitar" (1993)	"Pop Is Dead" (1993)	"Stop Whispering" (1993)

"Pop Is Dead" is a song by the English rock band Radiohead, released as a non-album single on 10 May 1993, several months after their debut album, Pablo Honey. It features a chromatic guitar riff and lyrics criticising the music industry. The music video features the singer, Thom Yorke, in a coffin.

"Pop Is Dead" reached number 42 on the UK singles chart and received negative reviews. Years later, members of Radiohead said they regretted releasing it. It is not available on streaming platforms.

== Music ==
"Pop Is Dead" is driven by a chromatic riff played by the lead guitarist, Jonny Greenwood. Louder described it as a "crunching, seething and quite silly alt-rock track". The lyrics criticise the media and music industry, a theme shared with Radiohead's previous single, "Anyone Can Play Guitar". The singer, Thom Yorke, said: "I wrote 'Pop Is Dead' as a kind of epitaph to 1992. Hence the lines 'Pop is dead / died an ugly death by catalogue'." At a live performance in 1994, Yorke dedicated the song to "members of the press ... fucking bunch of losers".

The journalist Mac Randall described the acoustic B-side "Banana Co." as "Beatlesque", with lyrics hinting at a loathing of multinational corporations. The electric version of "Banana Co." was later included on the "Street Spirit (Fade Out)" single (1996). Another B-side, a live performance of the Pablo Honey song "Ripcord", was recorded at a Town and Country Club gig in London in February 1993, when Radiohead opened for Belly. The performance contains extra lyrics: "They can kiss my ass!"

== Music video ==
Thom Yorke as "a dandified vampire in a glass coffin" in the music video

The music video was directed by Dwight Clarke, based on a treatment by Yorke. Stereogum likened it to a Nirvana video. It features Yorke portraying the character of Pop as "a dandified vampire in a glass coffin", accompanied by other band members. Yorke was carried in the coffin by members of the Radiohead fan club.

According to the bassist, Colin Greenwood, Radiohead's record company, EMI, gave Radiohead a stylist and money for clothes. The members chose completely different outfits: "We looked like we were in four different bands."

== Release ==
"Pop Is Dead" reached number 42 on the UK singles chart. It was not released in the US. A performance was included in the 1995 live video Live at the Astoria. Years after its release, the Radiohead guitarist Ed O'Brien called it "a hideous mistake", and the drummer, Philip Selway, said he regretted releasing it. Asked in 2003 what advice Radiohead would give to their 1991 selves, Yorke responded: "Don't release 'Pop Is Dead'!"

"Pop Is Dead" was included on the 2009 Pablo Honey reissue, released by EMI without Radiohead's approval. In 2016, after Radiohead's catalogue was transferred to XL Recordings, the reissue was removed from streaming services. "Pop Is Dead" is not available on streaming platforms and was not added to Radiohead's online Public Library archive.

== Reception ==
Reviewing the Pablo Honey reissue for IGN, Finn White described "Pop Is Dead" as a "clever and humorous rock satire". However, Pitchfork's Scott Plagenhoef found it "dreadful". In The Quietus, Wyndham Wallace wrote that it "appeared so contemptuous that it was hard, even for Radiohead’s biggest fans, to like", and described the video as "ill-advised". In 2019, the journalist Marc Hogan named "Pop Is Dead" the worst Radiohead song.

The Guardian journalist Chris Salmon wrote that while Radiohead had made several of the best videos of all time, "Pop Is Dead" was among the worst. Radiohead's video commissioner, Dilly Gent, said: "In the early '90s, we probably thought those videos were all right, but looking back at them now, we all just want to die."

== Track listing ==
1. "Pop Is Dead" – 2:13
2. "Banana Co." (acoustic) – 2:27
3. "Creep" (live) – 4:11
4. "Ripcord" (live) – 3:08

== Personnel ==
Radiohead

- Thom Yorke – vocals, guitar
- Jonny Greenwood – guitar, piano
- Colin Greenwood – bass guitar
- Ed O'Brien – guitar, backing vocals
- Philip Selway – drums

Production and artwork

- Jim Warren – production
- Radiohead – production
- Barry Hammond – mixing
- Rachel Owen – artwork
- Icon – design

== Chart performance ==
Chart (1993)	Peak position
UK Singles Chart	42
