= My Best Theory =

Single by Jimmy Eat World

from the album Invented
- Released: August 10, 2010
- Recorded: 2010
- Genre: Pop punk, alternative rock
- Length: 3:23
- Label: Interscope
- Songwriters: Jim Adkins; Rick Burch; Zach Lind; Tom Linton
- Producer: Mark Trombino

Jimmy Eat World singles chronology
"Always Be" (2007)	"My Best Theory" (2010)	"Coffee and Cigarettes" (2011)

"My Best Theory" is the lead single from Jimmy Eat World's seventh studio album Invented. The song began receiving its first radio airplay on August 10, 2010, and impacted radio on August 17. The UK digital release was September 26, 2010.

The song has peaked at number 9 on the Billboard Rock Songs chart and number 2 on the Alternative Songs chart; the band's highest-charting single since "Pain" hit number one in 2004. The song was included in the soundtrack for Tony Hawk: Shred.

== Concept ==
In an interview, the band's frontman Jim Adkins said:

"The song is about finding your individuality in a world where extremes are more and more presented as your only option. We thought taking a science fiction approach would be a great way to demonstrate breaking free of what may be expected from an individual. We loved director Ron Winter’s work and thought he was the perfect choice to help."

== Music video ==
Near the beginning of the video, a masked person is visible, along with various shapes and textures (probably symbolizing attempted mind control.) That person is then sent to some sort of altar inside a building by a second kind of masked people, this time symbolizing malevolence. They join two others already apparently working at the altar, giving power to the evil people. At the beginning of the second verse, one of the good masked people who were already there before tries to escape, but then is shot down by the evil people. They then use some sort of science fiction lasers to get rid of the body. This distraction allows for the remaining good people to escape, but are then chased by the evil ones. The good people are chased out of the building, and into the deep woods where (they think) they are safe. After recognizing each other's voice, they unmask each other to reveal two girls (possibly having some kind of past connection.) They both fall asleep, and are awoken in the morning by the evil people's lasers. They start panicking, and right as the song ends at this point, the video cuts to black.

No member of Jimmy Eat World appears in the video.

== Track listing ==
7" Vinyl (US version)

1. "My Best Theory"
2. "Stop"

7" Vinyl [Picture Disc] (UK version)

1. "My Best Theory"
2. "Anais"

== Charts ==
Chart (2010)	Peak position
US Alternative Airplay (Billboard)	2
US Bubbling Under Hot 100 (Billboard)	14
