= Stop Whispering =

- US CD single

Single by Radiohead

from the album Pablo Honey
- Released: 5 October 1993
- Recorded: 1993
- Genre: Alternative rock; jangle pop; post-grunge
- Length: 5:26
- Label: Parlophone
- Composer: Radiohead
- Lyricist: Thom Yorke
- Producers: Sean Slade; Paul Q. Kolderie

Radiohead singles chronology
"Pop Is Dead" (1993)	"Stop Whispering" (1993)	"My Iron Lung" (1994)

"Stop Whispering" is a song by the English alternative rock band Radiohead, included on their debut album, Pablo Honey (1993). It was released as a single in the US in October 1993. Radiohead rerecorded it for the single release, as they were unsatisfied with the album version.

== Recording ==
Radiohead recorded various demos of "Stop Whispering" while they were an unsigned band in Abingdon, Oxfordshire. One version impressed the owner of another local studio, Chris Hufford, who became Radiohead's co-manager with his partner, Bryce Edge.

Radiohead recorded "Stop Whispering" for their debut album, Pablo Honey (1993). According to the co-producer, Paul Kolderie, "We tinkered with it a bit. It was kind of a sprawling thing and we weren't sure how long it would be." Radiohead re-recorded "Stop Whispering" for the US single, as they were not happy with the album version. The guitarist Ed O'Brien said the new version was more atmospheric, likening it to Joy Division.

== Release ==
"Stop Whispering" was the third single released from Pablo Honey. It was unsuccessful. It reached number 23 on the US Modern Rock Tracks chart in October 1993. In Australia, it was released as the follow-up to Radiohead's debut single, "Creep", on 7 February 1994, and reached number 131 on the ARIA singles chart. A music video for the song premiered on MTV's alternative rock program 120 Minutes on September 19, 1993. Jimmy Eat World covered "Stop Whispering" on their 2013 EP Damage.

== Track listing ==
1. "Stop Whispering" (US version) – 4:11
2. "Creep" (acoustic) – 4:19
3. "Pop Is Dead" – 2:12
4. "Inside My Head" (live) – 2:58

== Personnel ==
Radiohead

- Thom Yorke – lead vocals, rhythm guitar
- Colin Greenwood – bass guitar
- Jonny Greenwood – lead guitar, organ
- Ed O'Brien – rhythm guitar, backing vocals
- Philip Selway – drums
- Peter Darley Miller – cover art photography

== Charts ==
Chart (1993–1994)	Peak position
Australia (ARIA)	131
US Alternative Airplay (Billboard)	23
