= Futures (album) =

Studio album by Jimmy Eat World
- Released: October 19, 2004
- Recorded: February–May 2004
- Studios: Cello, Hollywood, California; Harvey Moltz's house, Tucson, Arizona; Tempe, Tempe, Arizona; Ocean Way, Hollywood, California
- Genres: Alternative rock; power pop; emo; pop rock; pop-punk
- Length: 49:33
- Label: Interscope
- Producer: Gil Norton

Jimmy Eat World chronology
Bleed American (2001)	Futures (2004)	Stay on My Side Tonight (2005)

Singles from Futures
- 1. "Pain" Released: August 24, 2004; 2. "Work" Released: December 7, 2004; 3. "Futures" Released: May 10, 2005

Futures is the fifth studio album by American rock band Jimmy Eat World, released on October 19, 2004, through Interscope Records. After touring in support of Bleed American (2001) for two years, the band returned home and began working on new material by mid-2003. Following fruitless sessions with producer Mark Trombino, the band re-grouped and recorded with Gil Norton. The sessions lasted from February to May 2004 and were held at various studios in California and Arizona. Described as encompassing several rock styles, Futures included more solos and complex guitar parts than past releases, intended to expand on the atmosphere of their third studio album Clarity (1999). The songs on the album were compared to the work of Jets to Brazil and Maritime, while some of the guitar parts echoed the sound of Fugazi and Hüsker Dü.

Futures was met with favorable reaction from music critics, many of whom found it an enjoyable listen and praised the songwriting. It charted at number 6 on the US Billboard 200 after selling 98,000 copies in its first week. It would go on to sell over 615,000 copies, and was later certified gold by the Recording Industry Association of America (RIAA). "Pain" was released as the album's lead single in August 2004. Futures was promoted with headlining tours of the US, Europe, and Japan, before the band toured with Green Day in the US, the UK, and Australia. Jimmy Eat World followed the album with two further singles, "Work" in December 2004 and "Futures" in May 2005. Some publications, such as Blender, Rolling Stone, and Spin included the album on their list of the year's best releases. "Pain" was later certified gold by the RIAA and peaked at number 93 on the Billboard Hot 100. "Work" and "Futures" both reached the top 30 of the radio-only Alternative Airplay chart, with the former peaking higher at number six.

== Background and development ==
In July 2001, Jimmy Eat World released their fourth studio album, Bleed American, through major label DreamWorks Records. It became a commercial success, selling over 1.3 million copies, being certified platinum in the United States by the Recording Industry Association of America (RIAA). Two of its singles charted on the Billboard 200, namely, "Sweetness" at number 75 and "The Middle" at number five. Due to the album's popularity, the band promoted it with two years of touring, which made it hard for the members to unwind after returning home. In May 2003, vocalist and lead guitarist Jim Adkins said that the band had a lot of new material and would record sometime thereafter with Mark Trombino in Los Angeles, California. Trombino worked with the band previously, having produced Static Prevails (1996), Clarity (1999), and Bleed American.

Jimmy Eat World began pre-production in mid-July with Trombino, where they worked on 18 songs. Recording began in early August, with the aim of working on 14 songs. By September 2003, after five weeks, recording sessions were nearly finished. The group reached a breaking point with Trombino as they ran out of song ideas; their disagreements led to Trombino's departure from the project, with Adkins saying, "I wouldn't want to work with people who aren't extremely passionate about their ideas and their contributions." The band subsequently took a break and performed a few shows. Believe in What You Want, a stop-gap video/live-album, was released in October. The following month, the band's label, DreamWorks, was bought by Universal Music Group and absorbed into Interscope Records in January 2004.

== Production ==
Jimmy Eat World regrouped sometime after and wrote "Work", "Pain", "Polaris", and "23". The band had been working with Trombino for around 10 years and wanted to see what ideas another producer would suggest. Bassist Rick Burch said they felt it was too soon to work on an album, having spent a considerable amount of time touring Bleed American, suggesting that they should have taken a six-month break. The members had liked albums by the different acts that producer Gil Norton had previously produced, such as the Pixies, the Distillers, and Dashboard Confessional. Lind said that while Trombino was able to handle recording, mix and be a producer, Norton preferred to focus his efforts on the production. He added that Norton's long career producing aided the band's direction. Norton spent two days at the band's own studio, where they showed him demos they had done. Norton enjoyed the demos and was enlisted by the band to produce their next album. Pre-production started and lasted for a month before recording sessions began in February 2004 at Cello Studios in Los Angeles.

When they entered the studio, they had accumulated about 30 tracks to work with; Norton and engineer David Schiffman were assisted by Jason Grossman and Steven Rhodes. The drum parts and a few basic tracks were completed over the course of three weeks. Drummer Zach Lind said he fell into the habit of doing simple drum patterns during the making of Clarity and Bleed American, but Norton pushed Lind to challenge himself. Sessions then moved to the home studio of Harvey Moltz, a friend of the band, in Tucson, Arizona, where most of the album was recorded. Adkins said the group simply wanted a change of scenery from California, as Tucson helped them work without distractions; guitars and vocals were done there. During the course of the sessions, the band recorded up to 9 or 10 versions of each track.

Additional recording was done by the band at Tempe Studio in Tempe, Arizona, where they recorded vocals. Strings were recorded at Oceanway Studios in Los Angeles with Jake Davies, who was assisted by Greg Burns. Rich Costey and Davies acted as additional engineers; the latter also did digital editing. While recording strings for "Drugs or Me", there were 30 minutes remaining for the session. Davies transcribed a synthesizer placeholder part for "23" into string notation and had the musicians record it with the time left over. Sessions were concluded in May 2004, with mixing taking place from mid-June over the course of a month, with Costey at Cello Studios. He was assisted in this process by Claudius Mittendorfer with secondary engineer Dan Leffler. Costey mixed "Drugs or Me" at Avatar Studios in New York City with secondary engineer Ross Petersen. Ted Jensen then mastered the recordings at Sterling Sound in New York City.

== Composition ==
=== Overview ===
Musically, Futures has been described as alternative rock, arena rock, emo, pop-punk, pop rock, and power pop. The album saw the band shy away from the pop-influenced sound of Bleed American and expand on the mood of Clarity. The band incorporated more guitar solos, which rhythm guitarist Tom Linton had been insisting on, and complex guitar lines. Adkins viewed the release as a sequel to Clarity, with which Futures shared greater musical density. When working on material, Adkins would show the band a rough outline of it, which the rest of the members would flesh out and potentially add further instrumentation, such as piano. Discussing the title, Adkins said it could be perceived in different ways: "It's pessimistic, it's optimistic, and hopeful, and greedy all at the same time."

Lind compared its darker sound to the middle portion of Clarity and said the album's second half was more atmospheric than their previous work. Some of the material on the album dated back to when the band was recording Bleed American, while other material had existed for only two weeks prior to the band entering the studio for Futures. Linton said producer Norton provided a number of "really good" song ideas in regards to the sound and final arrangements. Norton helped the band think about transitions between sections in songs; previously Adkins felt "the best transition was none... I always thought it was more powerful not to do one." The album drew comparisons to the bands Jets to Brazil and Maritime, while some of the guitar lines recalled Hüsker Dü and Fugazi. The lyrics delve into darker subject matter, such as despair, politics, drug abuse, and self-loathing. Adkins said several tracks were influenced by the presidency of George W. Bush; he said he was "reacting to the political climate of that period".

=== Tracks ===
The opening song, "Futures", was a mid-tempo track that was compared to other acts Norton had worked with, such as Foo Fighters and the Pixies. The song starts with two harmonizing guitar riffs, shifting into verses that put the vocals at the forefront. A tremolo-affected guitar line in the pre-chorus leads into the half-time chorus section, complete with echo-enhanced vocals. In an earlier iteration of the song, the bridge section was a wall of loud guitars, instead of the final version where it shifts to acoustic guitars and a Rhodes piano. Adkins said the track was about Bush as well as disillusionment. One of lines from the song's chorus – "Trade up for the fast ride" – is taken verbatim from "In the Same Room", a track from Static Prevails. "Just Tonight..." was in the vein of "Run to You" by Bryan Adams, and recalled the group's Static Prevails material. "Just Tonight..." was one of the earliest songs written for the album, and ended up receiving constant minor changes during the writing process. The track was originally called "Sex You Up"; Lind said its final name "Just Tonight..." was a reference to Color Me Badd.

"Work" is a pop-rock track with vocal harmonies that recalled "The Middle". Liz Phair contributed backing vocals to it; the group felt it would be a song she should sing. The band's A&R representative personally knew Phair, and eventually got in contact with her. Adkins, who wrote the song while having Phair's "Divorce Song" (1993) in mind, said the track was simply about "doing something you know you shouldn't be doing". "Kill" opens with a piano and acoustic guitar intro, which builds to crescendos in the vein of the Pixies. Burch's bassline plays a counter-melody to the acoustic guitar; strings are barely audible during the bridge section. Adkins set himself a challenge to write a track that had no repetitive lyrics, which became "Kill"; it features a reference to the Heatmiser song "Half Right". Lind had discovered a piece of music that became "Kill" partway through writing when looking through their ideas on a computer. It had scratch vocals from Adkins and a 30-second acoustic guitar part. Lind was impressed that out of all the ideas they had, this section had fallen by the wayside. He showed the clip to Adkins, when the pair quickly expanded it into a full song.

"The World You Love" was initially titled "Suicide" and went through many versions before the band landed at the final one. The AC/DC-indebted track, "Pain", discusses the pros and cons of self-medicating through the use of alcohol and drugs. It was the last track written for the album, done just before they entered the studio. Adkins came up with the lyrics while walking around the University of Arizona campus. "Drugs or Me" is a piano-and-feedback-led ballad about Adkins's friend choosing him or drugs. It features strings that were arranged by David Campbell and was compared to the work of Death Cab for Cutie. An earlier version included an acoustic guitar playing eighth notes, which the rest of the song was then based upon. They later re-made it, building the song around Adkins' vocals and swapping the acoustic eighth notes for arpeggiated guitar and piano parts.

"Polaris" was done in the vein of U2; the guitar part was a mix of "Frontwards" by Pavement and "Hysteria" by Def Leppard. Norton persuaded the band to end the song with another chorus breakdown instead of concluding early as they intended. The following track, "Nothingwrong", was the most reminiscent of Bleed American, specifically the track "Get It Faster". The power ballad "Night Drive" opens with an "ooh" vocal melody; it talks about an alcoholic person in Adkins's life. Adkins said with the track, the listener "get[s] the feeling of a verse, chorus and bridge", despite only one chord progression being present throughout it. The album's closer, "23", recalled the 1989 album Disintegration by the Cure. It starts with an electric guitar part and echo-affected acoustic guitars, before the drums and Adkins's vocal part accompany them. Adkins said it is about discovery and taking chances on opportunities that arise. The song was an attempt to match both the atmospheric material on Clarity and the intentionally simplistic songs found on Bleed American.

== Release ==
On July 15, 2004, Futures was announced for release in three months' time; alongside this, the band emailed three songs, namely "Pain", "Just Tonight..." and "Polaris", to their street team. On July 30, the album's track listing was revealed. Samples of three new tracks—"Futures", "Nothingwrong", and "Night Drive"—were posted on the group's website shortly afterwards. "Pain" was released as the album's lead single on August 24, 2004. Two versions of the CD single were released: one included demos of "When I Want" and "Shame" and the music video for "Pain"; while the other featured the demo "Shame", a live recording of "Yer Feet", and the video for "Pain". The video, which premiered on September 14 through Launch.com, was directed by Paul Fedor and roughly followed the theme of the 1985 film Better Off Dead. It was shot in North Bridge, California.

On October 11, Futures was made available for streaming through MTV's website before being released on October 19 through Interscope Records. The artwork was a photograph taken by Christopher Wray-McCann at Burning Man. According to Adkins, the event had a phonebooth "in the middle of nowhere with a sign above it that says 'Talk to God'". Bonus tracks were added to various versions: "Shame" on the vinyl and European CD versions; "Shame", "When I Want", and "You" on the Japanese edition. Some promotional copies featured the extra track "Jen", which was left off the album, as Adkins felt it was out of place. A deluxe edition of the album was released showcasing the album's songs in demo form. The UK deluxe edition included "Shame" and "When I Want", and demo versions of both of them, as bonus tracks, while the Japanese version featured "Shame", "When I Want", "You", demos of these three tracks, alongside "Sparkle", an acoustic version of "Work", and a cover of "The Concept" by Teenage Fanclub. The cover was also featured on the 7" vinyl version of the single "Work".

"Work" was released to radio on December 7, 2004. To coincide with the UK stint of a European tour, "Work" was released as a single there in March 2005. The CD single included the glitch musician Styrofoam's remix of "Drugs or Me" and an acoustic version of "Work", as well as the song's music video. Futures was released to radio on May 10, 2005. In 2013, an iTunes Sessions EP was released, which featured a rendition of "Kill". In 2014, the band went on a celebratory 10th anniversary tour for the album, where they played it live in its entirety, touring the US, Australia, and New Zealand. To coincide with this, Futures, alongside Static Prevails and Clarity, was re-pressed on vinyl. In 2021, the band performed the album in its entirety again, alongside 2019's Surviving and 1999's Clarity.

== Touring ==
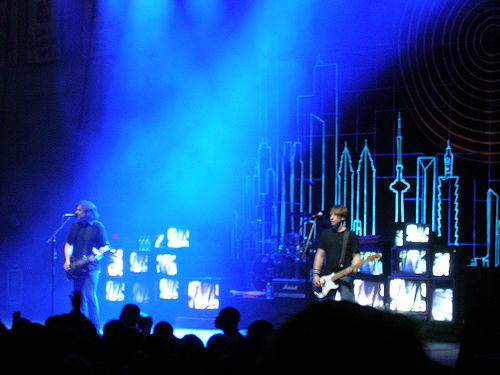
Jimmy Eat World performing live in 2005.

In late August and early September 2004, the band performed at the Street Scene and Summerfest festivals. Later in September, the group played two shows in the UK. To promote its release, the band played in-store gigs, held listening parties at Fast Forward chain stores, and a session for Launch.com. They appeared on Daily Download, Late Night with Conan O'Brien, and Jimmy Kimmel Live!. In October and November, they embarked on a US tour with the likes of Recover, Emanuel, and Razorlight. Throughout December, the band played a series of radio festivals. In January 2005, they went on a brief, two-week US tour with Elefant and Reuben's Accomplice.

In February and March 2005, the group went on a European tour, which ended with a stint in the UK. At the end of March, the band performed on The Tonight Show with Jay Leno. A short series of shows in Japan led into a two-month US arena tour, co-headlining with Taking Back Sunday in April and May. Some shows featured supporting acts the Format and Mates of State. Jimmy Eat World supported Green Day for two shows in the UK in June, which was followed by a European tour in June and July. In late August, the group performed at the Reading and Leeds Festivals. Following this, between late August and October, the band had a supporting slot on Green Day's three-month US arena tour. In December, the group again supported Green Day, for two shows in Australia.

== Reception ==
=== Critical response ===
Professional ratings
Aggregate scores
Source	Rating
Metacritic	73/100
Review scores
Source	Rating
AllMusic	4/5 stars
Billboard	Favorable
Drowned in Sound	8/10
E! Online	A−
Entertainment Weekly	B−
The Guardian	4/5 stars
IGN	6.5/10
Pitchfork	3.0/10
Rolling Stone	3.5/5 stars
Sputnikmusic	5/5

Futures was well received by music critics upon its release. On the review aggregating website Metacritic, the album obtained an average score of 73, based on 22 critics, indicating "generally favorable reviews".

Sputnikmusic staff member Adam Knott wrote that each second of the album "is direct in its accessible, spirited approach and brilliantly executed." Its "[g]ut-wrenching guitar lines, rhythmic releases and poignant songwriting are not even consistent; they're constant." In a review for Punknews.org, Scott Heisel said the tracks "toe the ever-so-thin line between commercial success and artistic integrity", thanks in part to Norton. E! Online found in the album a return to the group's early beginnings, "sporting 11 sparkling gems that carefully balance balladry ... with bombast". Bram Teitelman of Billboard said it contained the "same trademarks that made [Bleed American] so enjoyable ... upbeat pop-punk, tempered with moodier, slower songs, great melodies and vocal harmonies". Entertainment Weekly writer Brian Hiatt opined that "if Jimmy are in the middle of a long ride, Futures retains just enough tunefulness to keep us from jumping out of the car."

At The Guardian, Betty Clarke noted that the record was "the ultimate pop-rock break-up album", with Adkins "jump[ing] neck-deep into heartbreak. His lyrics are his strength." Rob Sheffield of Rolling Stone found the band to be "rid[ing] their bighearted radio rock into O.C.-worthy teen turmoil on Futures, their fifth and finest album." Drowned in Sound's Gareth Dobson said the album would not "break the mould, it's not too radical, but then, JEW never were." It was "an inviting, maturing album that still shows enough vitality to still be classed as a good rock album." AllMusic reviewer Tim Sendra stated "Futures will most likely not be the sensation that Bleed American was – it is too dark and inwardly focused for that." Sendra, however, noted that the album shows a sound progression that fans should accept. IGN writer Todd Gilchrist criticized it as "music for adults trying to be kids, and, well, I'm an adult." He added that it was not "a bad album, but merely an unspecial one".

=== Commercial performance and accolades ===
Futures sold 98,000 copies in its first week, charting at number six on the US Billboard 200. Prior to the release of Chase This Light (2007), Futures had sold over 615,000 copies. Futures was certified gold in the US by the RIAA in March 2005, which was followed by gold certification of "Pain" two months later. Outside the US, Futures reached number seven in Canada, number 22 in the UK, number 23 in Scotland, number 27 in Australia, number 33 in Germany, and number 65 in Switzerland. The album was certified gold in Canada, and silver in the UK.

"Pain" charted at number one on Alternative Airplay, number 27 on Digital Song Sales, and number 93 on the Hot 100. "Work" charted at number six on Alternative Airplay, and number ten on Bubbling Under Hot 100. "Futures" charted at number 27 on Alternative Airplay.

Blender, Rolling Stone, Spartanburg Herald-Journal, and Spin included the album on their best-of-2004 album lists. It was ranked at number 44 in Kerrang!'s "50 Albums You Need to Hear Before You Die" list. Mayday Parade drummer Jake Bundrick cited the album as an inspiration, while Alex Gaskarth of All Time Low has expressed admiration for it. Three of the album's songs, namely, "Just Tonight...", "Work", and "Nothingwrong", were covered by Australian acts for the tribute album Sing It Back: A Tribute to Jimmy Eat World (2015).

== Track listing ==
All songs written by Jimmy Eat World. All recordings produced by Gil Norton.

No.	Title	Length
1.	"Futures"	3:58
2.	"Just Tonight..."	3:26
3.	"Work"	3:23
4.	"Kill"	3:48
5.	"The World You Love"	5:01
6.	"Pain"	3:01
7.	"Drugs or Me"	6:25
8.	"Polaris"	4:51
9.	"Nothingwrong"	3:09
10.	"Night Drive"	5:03
11.	"23"	7:23

== Personnel ==
Personnel per booklet, except where noted.

Jimmy Eat World

- Jim Adkins – vocals, lead guitar
- Rick Burch – bass guitar
- Zach Lind – drums
- Tom Linton – rhythm guitar

Additional musicians

- David Campbell – string arrangement on "Drugs or Me"
- Liz Phair – backing vocals on "Work"

Production

- Gil Norton – producer
- David Schiffman – engineer
- Rich Costey – mixing, additional engineer
- Jake Davies – additional engineer, digital editing, string recording
- Jason Grossman – assistant
- Steven Rhodes – assistant
- Jimmy Eat World – additional recording
- Claudius Mittendorfer – assistant
- Dan Leffler – second engineer
- Ross Petersen – second engineer
- Greg Burns – assistant
- Ted Jensen – mastering
- Christopher Wray-McCann – front cover photograph
- Kevin Scanlon – photography
- Ben Allgood – art direction

== Charts ==
=== Weekly charts ===
Weekly chart performance for Futures
Chart (2004)	Peak position
Australian Albums (ARIA)	27
Canadian Albums (Billboard)	7
Dutch Alternative Albums (Alternative Top 30)	30
German Albums (Offizielle Top 100)	33
Irish Albums (IRMA)	51
Japanese Albums (Oricon)	39
Scottish Albums (Official Charts)	23
Swiss Albums (Schweizer Hitparade)	65
UK Albums (Official Charts)	22
UK Rock & Metal Albums (Official Charts)	3
US Billboard 200	6

=== Year-end charts ===
Year-end chart performance for Futures
Chart (2005)	Position
US Billboard 200	200

== Certifications ==
Certifications for Futures
Region	Certification	Certified units/sales
Canada (Music Canada)	Gold	50,000^{^}
United Kingdom (BPI)	Gold	100,000^{‡}
United States (RIAA)	Gold	500,000^{^}
^{^} Shipments figures based on certification alone.^{‡} Sales+streaming figures based on certification alone.
