= Lucky Denver Mint =

- Cover art for 1999 promo CD

Single by Jimmy Eat World

from the album Clarity and Never Been Kissed: Music From The Motion Picture
- Released: January 1999
- Recorded: 1998
- Genre: Emo; power pop
- Length: 3:49
- Label: Capitol
- Songwriters: Jim Adkins; Rick Burch; Zach Lind; Tom Linton
- Producer: Mark Trombino

Jimmy Eat World singles chronology
"Call It In The Air" (1996)	"Lucky Denver Mint" (1999)	"Blister" (1999)

"Lucky Denver Mint" is a song by American rock band Jimmy Eat World. Originally appearing on their 1998 self-titled EP, it was their first instance of radio success, receiving attention in early 1999 after being added to KROQ playlists. It was shipped to modern rock radio stations in January as the lead single from their third studio album Clarity, which was released on February 23, 1999. The song was also physically released as a promotional single in early 1999.

Stylistically, the track has been described as "hard-edged but poppy."

== Background and release ==
The song was officially released in its album context on February 23, 1999 as the second track on the band's album Clarity. The studio album's release was complicated by lack of enthusiasm from Capitol Records towards the band and the album, and, as a result, the album had still not come out by the beginning of 1999 despite recording having finished back in June 1998. However, before Clarity was even formally released, "Lucky Denver Mint" became something of a surprise radio hit after an A&R professional from the label sent the song to KROQ radio in Los Angeles in 1998, which decided to put the song on rotation there despite there being no official album release, and the sudden popularity of the song on such a large radio station convinced the label to formally release both the song and then later the album.

The label first prepared a self-titled EP, which contained "Lucky Denver Mint" as the opening track, which was released in December 1998 by indie label Fueled by Ramen.

== Promotion ==
The song was pitched for the film Never Been Kissed, and ended up on the film's soundtrack, which came out only a few months after the release of Clarity in February 1999. A promo single was later released prior to the formal release of Clarity in February 1999. The band also made a music video for the song, although it failed to gain much momentum as by then the song was falling out of rotation.

At the peak of the song's popularity, it received plenty of airplay on stations from across the country, although it ironically did not appear in heavy rotation in Denver, Colorado. Vocalist and lyricist Jim Adkins claimed the song was not about the city of Denver, but was instead about "getting drunk in Las Vegas."

== Track listings ==
US Promo CD (1999)

1. Lucky Denver Mint – 3:23

US Vinyl 7" (1999)

1. Lucky Denver Mint – 3:23
2. Clarity (Re-Mastered) – 4:02

Europe Maxi-Single CD (2001)

1. Lucky Denver Mint – 3:49*
2. A Sunday – 4:31
3. Your New Aesthetic – 2:40

*The original track on the studio release of Clarity is longer than the single mix, as it contains an extended drumming outro.

== Personnel ==
Credits are adapted from the album's liner notes and sleeve.

Jimmy Eat World

- Jim Adkins – vocals, guitar
- Rick Burch – bass guitar
- Zach Lind – drums
- Tom Linton – guitar

Additional musicians

- Mark Trombino – programming
