= Work (Jimmy Eat World song) =

Single by Jimmy Eat World

from the album Futures
- Released: December 7, 2004
- Recorded: 2004
- Genre: Alternative rock; emo
- Length: 3:23
- Label: Interscope
- Songwriters: Jim Adkins; Rick Burch; Zach Lind; Tom Linton
- Producer: Gil Norton

Jimmy Eat World singles chronology
"Pain" (2004)	"Work" (2004)	"Futures" (2005)

Audio sample
- file; help

"Work" is a song by Jimmy Eat World from their 2004 album, Futures. It was the second single released from that album. The song was written by Jim Adkins and features backing vocals by Liz Phair. "Work" was released to radio on December 7, 2004.

"Work" received positive reviews from critics, and it appeared on the Billboard Alternative Songs chart and the UK Singles Chart. A music video was released for the song; it featured interviews with high school students. Since the song's release, Jimmy Eat World have included it in their live performances.

== Background ==
"Work" was written by Jimmy Eat World's frontman, Jim Adkins. According to Adkins, "'Work' is about doing something you know you shouldn't be doing ... It's about walking into an unhealthy situation, on purpose. Which could mean it's about an interoffice romance."

Liz Phair agreed to sing backing vocals on the song after the band played it for her. Adkins later said, "We're all fans of [Phair's album Exile in Guyville], so maybe a bit of a crush thing was happening. She definitely brings the sexiness. An unquantifiable sexiness, sure, but she definitely brings it. She was super cool to work with. 'Work' sounded like something she would sing, so we hunted her down through people we knew in Los Angeles. We showed her the song, she really liked it, so she came down and sang on it."

== Reception ==
=== Critical reception ===
"Work" received praise from music critics. It has been called a "classic" and has also been described as "a song tailor-made for teenage runaway fantasies." Tim Sendra of Allmusic noted that the song "display[s] the sweetly melodic side of the band." However, The Trades' Tony Pascarella called it "a more emo-geared track that stays shrouded on the dark side of Jimmy Eat World." Carrie Pierce of The Battalion wrote: "The gem of [Futures] is 'Work,' a catchy song featuring backup vocals by Liz Phair. It's too bad that you can barely hear Phair over the guitar riffs. The lyrics make up for this flaw. Though not as deep and brooding as other tracks, 'Work' will replay in your head."

=== Chart performance ===
"Work" was the second single from the 2004 album Futures. In the U.S., it stayed on the Billboard Alternative Songs chart for 21 weeks, peaking at number six on March 19, 2005. The song made two appearances on the UK Singles Chart and peaked at number 49 on April 9, 2005.

== In popular media ==
The song has been featured on the television shows One Tree Hill and Gossip Girl.

== Music video ==
The music video for "Work" was filmed at Madison West High School in Madison, Wisconsin. It features interviews with some of the school's students, who talk about their futures and their lives after graduation. The students are shown during the school day and also after school, doing things such as skateboarding, smashing television sets, and going to parties. The video also features the band playing under a tree in a field.

The music video's director, Marc Webb, grew up in Madison and attended Madison West High School.

== Live performances ==
Jimmy Eat World have included "Work" in their live performances since 2004. In November 2004, they played an acoustic version of the song in Live 105's annual Studio Sessions concerts. Aidin Vaziri of the San Francisco Chronicle wrote that "the simple acoustic setting added to [the] song."

The band played "Work" while touring in 2005, as well. At the Dunkin' Donuts Center on April 16, 2005, Jim Adkins' voice "nearly went hoarse with what appeared to be righteous anger" while singing the song. During their May performance at the Sony E3 party in Los Angeles, Liz Phair appeared on-stage to sing backing vocals. On October 5, Jimmy Eat World opened for Green Day at the American West Arena, and The Arizona Republic's Larry Rodgers reported that: "The poppy, upbeat 'Work' then spotlighted the solid rhythm section of bassist Rick Burch and drummer Zach Lind, as well Adkins ability to lay on the sugary vocals when necessary."

In 2008, the band played an "energetic rendition" of "Work" at The Bamboozle festival and also played the song in Leeds.

== Track list ==
CD

1. "Work"
2. "Drugs or Me" (Styrofoam remix)
3. "Work" (acoustic)
4. "Work" (video)

== Charts ==
=== Weekly charts ===
Weekly chart performance for "Work"
Chart (2005)	Peak position
Canada Rock Top 30 (Radio & Records)	17
Scotland Singles (OCC)	54
UK Singles (OCC)	49
US Bubbling Under Hot 100 (Billboard)	10
US Alternative Airplay (Billboard)	6

=== Year-end charts ===
Year-end chart performance for "Work"
Chart (2005)	Position
US Modern Rock Tracks (Billboard)	28

== Release history ==
Release dates and formats for "Work"
Region	Date	Format	Label(s)	Ref.
United States	February 22, 2005	Mainstream airplay	Interscope	
