= Clarity (Jimmy Eat World album) =

Studio album by Jimmy Eat World
- Released: February 23, 1999
- Recorded: May–June 1998
- Studios: Sound City, Van Nuys, California; Clear Lake Audio, North Hollywood, California
- Genres: Emo; punk rock; pop-punk
- Length: 63:57
- Label: Capitol
- Producers: Mark Trombino; Jimmy Eat World

Jimmy Eat World chronology
Static Prevails (1996)	Clarity (1999)	Singles (2000)

Singles from Clarity
- 1. "Lucky Denver Mint" Released: January 1999; 2. "Blister" Released: July 20, 1999

Clarity is the third studio album by American rock band Jimmy Eat World. It was released on February 23, 1999, through Capitol Records, with which Jimmy Eat World clashed several times while recording their second studio album Static Prevails (1996). The band recorded a follow-up with producer Mark Trombino in May and June 1998, and were free to make it however they wanted without interference from Capitol. The recording sessions began at Sound City in Van Nuys, California, before moving to Clear Lake Audio in North Hollywood, California. Clarity, which is described as an emo, pop punk, and punk rock release, marked the beginning of frontman Jim Adkins's tenure as the band's main vocalist, taking over from guitarist Tom Linton.

Following the release of Jimmy Eat World's self-titled second EP (1998), "Lucky Denver Mint" began airing on radio in January 1999. "Lucky Denver Mint" and "Blister" were released as singles in 1999; a music video was later made for the former, which was directed by Darren Doane. Jimmy Eat World went on a six-week tour of the United States, and appeared on that year's Warped Tour. In spite of promotion for "Lucky Denver Mint", Clarity was deemed a commercial failure, and Capitol dropped the band in August 1999. The band then toured Europe, and played three US shows before going on a break. Clarity was released worldwide in 2001, where it was promoted with "Lucky Denver Mint" and "Blister". The album has been re-released several times, and has been performed in its entirety by the band on multiple occasions.

Clarity reached number 30 on the US Billboard Heatseekers Albums chart, and peaked at number 47 in Germany. Despite receiving favorable reviews from music critics, many of whom praised the dynamic instrumentation, it was commercially overlooked upon release, but has since amassed cult status and further critical acclaim, and is lauded as one of the best emo albums of all time by publications such as Kerrang!, LA Weekly, and Rolling Stone. Some music critics have credited the album as an influence on later acts such as Something Corporate, the Wonder Years, and Chris Carrabba of Dashboard Confessional.

== Background ==
Jimmy Eat World released their second album Static Prevails through Capitol Records in July 1996. The creative process was hampered by recurring clashes with the band's record label, who insisted the band rework some of their songs and write new ones, and wanted to engage different producers. The album saw them shift away from the pop-punk sound of their earlier work, and into post-hardcore and emo. A&R representatives Craig Aaronson and Loren Israel were met with indifference at the label's offices, with president Gary Gersh not willing to support an act that was relatively unknown. Capitol included two songs on promotional samplers that were sent to programming directors at radio stations; the label said it was part of a development process it had for the band. The Dallas Observer said the sampler and a lack of promotion were seen as the label cutting its losses. Other issues included not willing to fund a music video, the band members unable to find the album stocked at record stores, and a proposal, which they rejected, that they play outside 7-Eleven stores. Jimmy Eat World promoted Static Prevails with a short tour of the United States, and a cross-country tour with Sense Field in early 1997.

Within a year of its release, the album had only sold less than 10,000 copies, marking it a commercial failure. Frontman Jim Adkins was disappointed with being on Capitol's roster and debated moving on with his life. Jimmy Eat World were making inroads grinding on tour, alongside their contemporaries in Braid, Jejune, and Mineral. Around this time, Jimmy Eat World was being tagged as emocore, shortened to emo, an introspective style of punk rock, within the music scene, as were their peers. Despite the band being under contract to Capitol, they decided to issue seven-inch vinyl records illegally as they felt the label would not notice them due to the lack of interest from Capitol. A three-way split single was released through Crank! A Record Company that featured Jimmy Eat World, Sense Field, and Mineral, which included an early version of "Crush". Sometime after this, Jimmy Eat World released a split single with Jejune that was released through Big Wheel Recreation. In early 1998, Adkins and guitarist Tom Linton were part of a six-person side project that would have consisted of soft rock material. When the project ended, it left behind a collection of unreleased songs on which Jimmy Eat World worked on for their next album. In March and April 1998, they supported the Promise Ring on their tour of the US. With Static Prevails' failure, the members debated what independent record labels that could sign with after Capitol dropped them. To their shock, Aaronson told them that Capitol wanted to release a second album from the band.

== Production ==
After a week of pre-production, Jimmy Eat World began recording Clarity with Mark Trombino in May and June 1998; the band and Trombino shared the producer credit. Capitol gave the band freedom to do what they wanted in the studio; this is attributed to the label having no interest in them by this point. Recording started at Sound City in Van Nuys, California, with assistant engineer Nick Raskulinecz. The band chose this studio because they had previously gotten good drum sounds on Static Prevails; however, due to its expensive rate, the band only recorded drum tracks there. They spent ten days here before moving to Clear Lake Audio in North Hollywood, California, where they recorded overdubs and tracked guitars over 40 days. During the process, the band slept on the office floor of their manager Jorge Hinojosa. Adkins said the studio atmosphere was ripe for experimenting; ideas were explored if they helped the songs. He added, "I would think a song was totally finished and then one of the guys in the band or [Trombino] would bring up an idea that really closed the deal".

Jimmy Eat World approached the recording assuming they would not get the opportunity to make another album, and decided to include a variety of extra instrumentation. Adkins said while recording "Table for Glasses", the band learned "if you aren't doing a lot, it doesn't take a lot to get a big dynamic impact", citing the cello as a prime example. The band recorded two different drum sets for "Lucky Denver Mint", a first for the band. They liked the effect, and also used two sets on "Ten" and "Goodbye Sky Harbor". "Crush" was re-recorded during the sessions. Throughout the recording process, the band wrote more material, and made demos. Trombino mixed the songs at One on One South in Los Angeles, California, with assistant engineers Ron Rivera and Justin Smith, and at Music Grinder in Hollywood with assistant engineer Dean Fisher. Brian Gardner then mastered the album at Bernie Grundman Mastering in Hollywood.

== Composition and lyrics ==
Clarity has been described as emo, pop-punk, and punk rock, with elements of chamber pop and electronica, and has been compared with the music of Bedhead. Journalist Dan Ozzi, in his book Sellout: The Major-Label Feeding Frenzy That Swept Punk, Emo, and Hardcore 1994–2007 (2021), wrote that Clarity was a "sweeping epic of an album", which melded dense orchestral writing with quirky rock structures. He added that the album was far removed from the sound of the underground emo movement and from what was playing on the radio. Unlike previously, where the band did not move beyond their typical guitar-bass-drum setup, Clarity saw the band toy with a variety of other instrumentation, such as bells, cellos, chimes, organs, pianos, temple blocks, triangles, and violins. Adkins had been going through a developmental stage as a writing and as a performer, having adopted the frontman role during their live shows. Clarity marks the start of Adkins having more lead vocals than Linton. With the exception of the song "Blister", from this point onwards, Linton only provided backing vocals on some tracks until "Action Needs an Audience" on their seventh studio album, Invented (2010). Previously, Adkins and Linton introduced new material during band practices, but for Clarity, Adkins handled most of the songwriting. Some of the tracks, including "Table for Glasses" and "Goodbye Sky Harbor", were intended for the aforementioned side project. Susie Katayama assisted Adkins in writing and arranging the string parts for some of the songs.

=== Songs ===
During breaks in touring in support of Static Prevails, Adkins worked at an art store, during which time he wrote "Table for Glasses". Adkins learned about shows that featured the work of local performance artists. Adkins was waiting for a friend's piece to begin when he noticed a girl clearing the area with the end of her dress. The girl moved and sat at a candle-lit table, where she removed dirt from her outfit. The slow-tempo song opens with a droning organ, followed by a shuffle beat, picked guitar notes, and concluding with a crescendo; the slowcore crawl and harmonies were influenced by the music of Low. "Lucky Denver Mint" was inspired by a night out in Las Vegas, Nevada, Adkins had with a friend; Adkins was too young to consume alcohol, and instead gambled, eventually spending all of his money. As a result, he spent the remainder of the night "walking around feeling lost". The power pop song includes drum and guitar loops, and is bookended with a drum intro and outro, which were made by Trombino cutting up the drums.

According to Lind, "Your New Aesthetic" was originally a "very mellow" song but was turned into "a more aggressive, dark rock song". This version was named "Skeleton" because the guitar sections between the verses felt like horror film music to the band; it had different lyrics but Adkins thought he could improve upon them, and changed the lyrics to those of the mellow version. The final version is about the commercialization of radio, and unabashed conformity, showcasing the band's punk roots. "Believe in What You Want" is a Police-influenced post-punk track that talks about keeping in mind what is important to one's self, and not getting stuck with unimportant matters. Part of its lyrics refer to dealing with the process of being on a major label, influenced by their interactions on Capitol. On "A Sunday", the band focused on making the chorus sections sound softer and more intimate than the verses. Adkins felt the song's slower tempo helped let the "drums breathe". He wrote it after driving home to Phoenix following a weekend seeing his friends, while reminiscing about a girl. The track includes a Hammond B3 organ, which the band borrowed from Sylvia Massy. Lind theorized Adkins wrote "Crush" when he was living in Flagstaff, Arizona, due to the reference of snow.

The title of "12.23.95" is a reference to Little Christmas Eve; it was made in the living room of Adkins's parents' house, consisting of a drum machine, and a tiny recording set up. Lind went round with a Dr. Rhythm drum machine while they were demoing material. He began pressing buttons, the drum patterns played at random. The band wrote music around it; the droning guitar that is heard was made by Adkins as he was playing the guitar tracks backwards, recording them on to a separate tape, and adding them back in. While in the studio, the band were unable to come up with a better drum sound, and ended up using the one from the drum machine. With "Ten", the band opted to use different drum set ups for each section of the song, as they had done with "Lucky Denver Mint". A loop is featured throughout the track, with Lind playing a different kit during the chorus and bridge portions. "Just Watch the Fireworks" began as a slower, ballad-esque type song, until Trombino suggested changing it to mid-tempo. The final version is drawn out by Katayama's and Joel Derouin's string parts. The power ballad "For Me This Is Heaven" uses a number of rhythmic parts, which was the result of Lind and Trombino playing with a variety of hand percussion instruments at their disposal. Adkins remarked: "They were wheeling in timpani when we realized we had taken it a little too far." Mia Huges of Spin said it was a "love song that’s about endings, and believing that love is worth it, despite their inevitability".

"Blister" recalls the melodic punk aggression of Static Prevails. Adkins said fans have asked why it is the only track on the album to feature Linton on lead vocals; "I think in leading up to Clarity I started immediately putting words to the music ideas I had. After that happened it was hard to not want to sing it." The title track, "Clarity", includes alternative tunings; Adkins said the band sounded unique, and were not a representation of their record collections. As such, "Clarity" was chosen as the title track. The closing track, "Goodbye Sky Harbor", lasts for 16 minutes and 11 seconds, starting as an up-tempo piece, and eventually shifting to a long section of dream pop that incorporates layers of electric guitars, vocal loops, a drum machine, and bells. The instruments fade out, being replaced with layered vocals that are then joined by percussion and a glockenspiel. The lyric "I am but one small instrument" is heard throughout the song. Adkins said they enjoyed playing the track's main guitar riff, and used a whole tape reel for it. Throughout the sessions, they continued "adding stuff and adding stuff, and it just got really ridiculous. It was basically because we could." Adkins said that he always wanted to work the books he was reading into his lyrics; the song's lyrics were based on John Irving's novel A Prayer for Owen Meany (1989).

== Release and promotion ==
Gersh was replaced by Roy Lott in 1998; the former later became Jimmy Eat World's co-manager. He felt the label's new regime was not equipped for developing a band like them. Adkins said Capitol had debated on when to release Clarity; as it was finished in the middle of the year, it "would’ve been fall or winter by the time it came out. And that’s usually a pretty bad time for a new release". Adkins attributed the delay to Lott having no intention of listening to it. With months passing, the band had a hunch that Capitol had no desire of issuing Clarity, something they felt Aaronson was hiding from them. The members were growing concerned that they might add up as major-label casualty, which they previously read about in punk zine Maximum Rocknroll. In November 1998, they went on a tour of the US. The band's A&R representative suggested releasing an EP; he contacted Vinnie Fiorello of Less Than Jake, who ran the indie label Fueled by Ramen, and supported the idea. The band's self-titled second EP was released on December 14, 1998, and includes "Lucky Denver Mint" and "For Me This Is Heaven" from Clarity.

Los Angeles-based radio station KROQ-FM began playing "Lucky Denver Mint" in early January 1999. As a result, there was interest in the song, and it appeared in the Drew Barrymore film Never Been Kissed (1999). It was planned to be used as a theme song for The Time of Your Life, a TV series by Fox that was canned. "Lucky Denver Mint" was released to modern rock radio stations as a single in late January 1999. After this, Clarity was given a release date. Clarity was eventually released on February 23, 1999. The album's booklet folds out to reveal a grid of sixteen images, four of which make up the front cover. The artwork details small amounts of light on a watery background, a flashlight lighting up the inside of a cave, and screen door netting. The CD label includes the words "Can you still feel the butterflies? 64:22", referring to a lyric in "For Me This Is Heaven", and the album's running time. By this point, the disc jockeys grew tired of "Lucky Denver Mint", cause it to leave their playlist rotation. Preceded by an appearance at the Snow Summit festival, Jimmy Eat World embarked on a US tour in February through to April 1999, with support on varying dates from the Sheila Divine, At the Drive-In, and Sense Field. The trek included an appearance at the SXSW music conference. While on this tour, Adkins suffered from panic disorder.

Jimmy Eat World recorded a version of a new song, "Sweetness", in March 1999; Linton said they were unsure what to do with it, though mentioned including it on future pressings of the album. A music video for "Lucky Denver Mint" was included on some CD versions of the album; the video was directed by Darren Doane, and depicts the members Jimmy Eat World getting defeated at various sports. It did not gain any traction at MTV, and while Never Been Kissed performed well at the box office, it did not further the band's career. In May and June 1999, toured across the US, appearing at Krazy Fest, with support on most dates from No Knife. Clarity was released in Japan on June 9, 1999; this edition included "What I Would Say to You Now" and "Christmas Card" as bonus tracks. Jimmy Eat World then appeared on the 1999 Warped Tour. "Blister" was released to radio stations on July 20, 1999. Despite critical praise and promotion of "Lucky Denver Mint" in Never Been Kissed, Clarity was commercially unsuccessful in a musical climate dominated by teen pop, and the band was dropped by Capitol in August 1999.

Jimmy Eat World said Capitol was too occupied overlooking the catalogs of the Beatles and Frank Sinatra, that they flew under the radar. By this stage, they were self-sustaining, having learned to be with Capitol's reluctance towards Static Prevails, as their popularity was on the rise. In September and October 1999, they embarked on a tour of Europe, with No Knife, and supported the Promise Ring for three shows at the end of October. The band's management were against the idea of going to Europe as the band did not have a stronghold in the US. The origin of this tour arose from their roadie Paul Drake having lugged CDs of Static Prevails to Europe when he went there with Braid and the Get Up Kids for their gigs. As overseas interest in Jimmy Eat World was growing, they purchased copies of their releases back from Capitol at cost and sent them to a distributor with international reach, who in turn sent them to stores. Upon arrival in Germany for the first show of the tour, six hundred fans had turned up. The trek was ultimately viewed as a success; by this point, Clarity had been shifting 500 copies a week. After this, Jimmy Eat World took a break, during which Adkins started the side project Go Big Casino and played some shows, while Lind got married. The band celebrated the end of the millennium with two shows in their hometown Tempe, Arizona. Clarity was released worldwide on January 29, 2001, which was re-promoted with the "Blister" and "Lucky Denver Mint" singles.

=== Reissues and full-album performances ===
Nettwerk America re-released Clarity and Static Prevails in June 2001. Both albums were again re-released, this time by Capitol, in May 2007; the Capitol Clarity reissue includes "Christmas Card", and a studio demo of "Sweetness" as bonus tracks. The 2009 vinyl reissue includes the two bonus tracks from the previous CD reissue. The 16 images that were used for the original album booklet appear on the front of the record sleeve. Art company The Uprising were hired to re-work the art for the 2009 release using the original images, saying, "we were brought on to reconstruct and reinterpret the original artwork. We wanted to stay true to the original, but give it a slightly more sophisticated and updated look & feel. These reconstructions are always a little tricky [...] but this turned out fantastic. And the actual prints look amazing!"

In February and March 2009, Jimmy Eat World went on tour, with support from Reuben's Accomplice and No Knife, to mark the 10-year anniversary since Clarity's release. The band, who had been extensively rehearsing in-studio, performed a rehearsal live online on February 12, 2009. They also released Clarity Live, a download-only recording of the tour's finale in Tempe that was released on April 7, 2009. The band performed their fourth studio album Bleed American (2001) and Clarity in their entirety in two shows in the UK in June 2011. In 2013, an EP called iTunes Sessions, which includes performances of "Goodbye Sky Harbor" and "For Me This Is Heaven", was released. In 2014, Clarity, along with Static Prevails and their fifth studio album Futures (2004), was reissued on vinyl. In 2021, the band performed the album in its entirety again, alongside tenth studio album Surviving (2019) and Futures, under the title Phoenix Sessions.

== Contemporary reception ==
Original release
Review scores
Source	Rating
AllMusic	4/5 stars
Alternative Press	5/5 stars
Kerrang!	5/5 stars
North County Times	A−
Nude as the News	4.5/10
Pitchfork	3.5/10
RTÉ	5/5 stars

Clarity was met with generally favorable reviews from music critics. AllMusic reviewer Mark Vanderhoff stated Clarity "mixes introspective balladry with power-chord punk rock, elements of chamber pop, and subtle doses of electronica to create a remarkably unique album". North County Times staff writer Stephen Rubin said Jimmy Eat World "deliver razor-sharp hooks and powerful melodies by draping infinite textures over a few simple chords", and that the "compelling guitar structures" of the title track help dissociate Jimmy Eat World "from the blink-182s of the world". Jan Schwarzkamp of Ox-Fanzine praised Clarity as a "howling beautiful milestone" that is "one of the most important albums in recent [times ... or] the finest that the emocore genre has to offer", and said the range of instrumentation on the album is "almost inexhaustible" without giving "the impression of overload".

RTÉ's Harry Guerin described the album as a "dense, beautiful collection which sees them bring in orchestras, drum loops and programming and find space for killer choruses, ballads and left field forays. The shortest song is under three minutes, the longest over 16 and the more you listen to all of them the more you'll wonder why this masterpiece wasn't massive." Amy Sciarretto of CMJ New Music Report noted the album's "prevailing mood is downcast", though Jimmy Eat World's performance is "striking enough to make you throw down that proverbial razor blade". Sciarretto added the album is powered by "tinny, clangy guitar riffs", and that it is "excessively dynamic, yet it's also a bit too tame". Nude as the News co-founder Jonathan Cohen said that while it had a "few pretty solid rock songs", there was "simply no real rock muscle to be flexed" with Clarity. Pitchfork writer Brent DiCrescenzo was dismissive of the album, writing, "There's no edge, no barb, no emotion. Sure, they may have come from the 'emo' scene, but the feelings here are so adolescent and stale that it's hard to be moved."

Clarity peaked at number 30 on the US Billboard Heatseekers Albums chart, and also charted at number 47 in Germany. Clarity went on to sell 50,000 copies, which Jimmy Eat World were impressed with but Capitol was not.

== Retrospective reviews ==
Retrospective reviews
Review scores
Source	Rating
Blender	4.5/5 stars
Exclaim!	8/10
Pitchfork	8.6/10
Punknews.org	5/5 stars
Record Collector	4/5 stars
Sputnikmusic	4.5/5
Stylus Magazine	A

Despite being largely overlooked upon its release, Clarity's critical stature has grown since 1999; to the point where Harry Guerin of RTÉ dubbed it "the Led Zeppelin IV of emo rock." Before the band's 10th-anniversary tour of the album, Pete Cottell of the Phoenix New Times wrote; "What's truly admirable about the album is that it moves in so many different directions without getting lost on its journey [...] Unlike the 12 other tracks on Clarity, ["Goodbye Sky Harbor"] is an almost impossible undertaking upon first listen. Once you've made it to the 13-minute mark, however, you'll never hit the skip button again." Cottell also stated; "I intently listened to each of the 13 tracks, fearing I would be let down [...] Ten years later, its safe to say that I've given up. Clarity is perfect." Leor Galil of the Bostonist, noted; "The album has been hailed as a cult and indie classic, and is one of a few go-to records that cemented an aural aesthetic known as emo, and is a genuinely deft and moving piece of music from start to finish".

Upon its re-issue in 2007, Blender magazine noted Clarity "established a foundation for 21st century emo. Dozens of weepy bottom-feeders have tried to write mid-20s angst anthems better than the soaring "Lucky Denver Mint" or the delicately heartbroken "Just Watch The Fireworks"—but few have succeeded." Tim Nelson of BBC Music was praising in his 2007 review of the album; "The band and Trombino deserve credit for blending heartfelt, yearning vocals and rock dynamics with adventurous production and unique instrumentation". Nate Chinen writing for The New York Times said "Clarity was a pivotal album for Jimmy Eat World, the first to feature Jim Adkins on lead vocals instead of Mr. Linton and the last to reflect the heart-on-sleeve values of emocore more than the hard gleam of pop-punk". Chinen said the tracks convey a sense of "acute self-awareness along with flashes of grace and insolence: the album is a pitch-perfect teenage plaint". Record Collector's Eleanor Goodman commented; "though the multicoloured cover of 1999’s Clarity became familiar in music shops, its combination of melancholy, introspective pop with faster punk rock broke the band in the US". Chris Ryan of The New Rolling Stone Album Guide said the band had cemented the "perfect balance of noise and bliss" on Clarity.

Sputnikmusic staff reviewer Andrew Hartwig praised Jimmy Eat World's musicianship and stated; "Musically, the band are excellent. The drumming is sophisticated and original and the use of two guitars is a great addition to the band. The aforementioned range of added instruments adds immensely to the arrangements of the songs". He summarized his review saying; "Clarity is an album full of sensible pop songs, replay value and a diverse range of instruments and sounds. Truly one of the best albums of the 90s". Charles Merwin of Stylus Magazine called it a "minor masterpiece—a product of its time and as important to modern emo as Weezer's "Pinkerton". Alternative Press included Clarity in their "10 Classic Albums of 1999" feature; according to Scott Heisel; "Like Weezer's Pinkerton before it, the album has gone on to serve as the birthplace of emo's third wave". He cited "Goodbye Sky Harbor" as a track that is frequently imitated "but never duplicated. Proving it's far better to test your own limits than rely on the parameters of others—which is the exact reason why Clarity resonates with tens of thousands of people, a decade later." When Kerrang! magazine made a Jimmy Eat World album guide, they stated; "Glorious is perhaps the best word to capture the essence of Clarity. Overflowing with flawless melodies backed up not only by magnificent musicianship but a ton of heart, this is the album that renders the label 'emo' redundant. Every note and syllable resonates with the kind of heartfelt emotion we'd like to think is poured into everything we listen to".

== Legacy and influence ==
Writing in 2003, Andy Greenwald called Clarity "one of the most fiercely beloved rock 'n' roll records of the last decade. It is name-checked by every single contemporary emo band as their favorite album, as a mind-bending milemarker that proved that punk rock could be tuneful, emotional, wide-ranging, and ambitious." William Goodman of Spin described it as a "benchmark emo and pop-punk classic". Clarity has appeared on various best-of emo album lists, including those by Kerrang!, LA Weekly, Louder, Loudwire, Rolling Stone, and Treblezine, as well as by journalists Leslie Simon and Trevor Kelley in their book Everybody Hurts: An Essential Guide to Emo Culture (2007). Songs from the album have appeared on best-of emo songs lists by NME, and Vulture. The 2007 re-release was included on Stylus Magazine's list of that year's best reissues.

Clarity has influenced the works of multiple artists and bands, such as Something Corporate, the Wonder Years, Josh Farro of Paramore, Chris Carrabba of Dashboard Confessional, Julien Baker, Pronoun, Jonathan Corley of Manchester Orchestra, and Heath Saraceno of Midtown. Trombino gained a lot of producer work thanks to Clarity, with bands wanting to make albums that sounded similar to that release. The Starting Line employed him to produce their debut studio album Say It Like You Mean It (2002) as all of their members' all-time favorite album was Clarity. Polar Bear Club posted a cover of "Lucky Denver Mint" on their Myspace profile in 2009, while the Color Morale covered "Blister" for their EP Artist Inspiration Series (2017).

== Track listing ==
All songs written by Jimmy Eat World. All recordings produced by Mark Trombino and Jimmy Eat World.

Clarity track listing
No.	Title	Length
1.	"Table for Glasses"	4:20
2.	"Lucky Denver Mint"	3:49
3.	"Your New Aesthetic"	2:40
4.	"Believe in What You Want"	3:08
5.	"A Sunday"	4:31
6.	"Crush"	3:11
7.	"12.23.95"	3:42
8.	"Ten"	3:48
9.	"Just Watch the Fireworks"	7:02
10.	"For Me This Is Heaven"	4:04
11.	"Blister"	3:29
12.	"Clarity"	4:02
13.	"Goodbye Sky Harbor"	16:11
Total length:		63:57

Expanded edition (2007 reissue)
No.	Title	Length
14.	"Christmas Card"	2:54
15.	"Sweetness" (Demo)	3:38
Total length:		70:29

== Personnel ==
Credits are adapted from the album's liner notes and sleeve.

Jimmy Eat World

- Jim Adkins – lead vocals (all except track 11), guitar; Farfisa (tracks 3 and 13), Vox Continental (track 4), Hammond B3 (tracks 5 and 13), bass guitar (track 7), Casiotone (tracks 7 and 9), piano (tracks 8 and 10), percussion (tracks 10 and 12), backing vocals (track 11), string arrangement
- Rick Burch – bass guitar (all except track 7)
- Zach Lind – drums (all except track 7), vibraphone (tracks 1 and 13), glockenspiel (tracks 1, 5 and 13), tubular bells (track 1), concert bass drum (track 1) programming (track 7), percussion (track 9)
- Tom Linton – guitar (all except tracks 1 and 7), piano (track 9), lead vocals (track 11)

Additional musicians

- Suzie Katayama – cello (tracks 1, 5 and 9), string arrangement
- Mark Trombino – programming (tracks 2, 7, 9 and 13), ReBirth (track 5), Farfisa (track 7), Minimoog (track 8), percussion sequencing (tracks 8 and 10), percussion (track 13), string arrangement
- Joel Derouin – violin (track 5)

Production

- Mark Trombino – producer, engineer, mixing
- Jimmy Eat World – producer
- Nick Raskulinecz – assistant engineer
- Ron Rivera – assistant engineer
- Justin Smith – assistant engineer
- Dean Fisher – assistant engineer
- Brian Gardner – mastering
- Evren Göknar – 2007 reissue mastering
- Paul Drake – photography
- Chrissy Piper – photography, portrait photography
- Jason Gnewikow – photography
- Jim Adkins – art direction
- Collection Agency – design

== Charts ==
Chart performance for Clarity
Chart (1999–2001)	Peak position
German Albums (Offizielle Top 100)	47
UK Rock & Metal Albums (Official Charts)	30
US Heatseekers Albums (Billboard)	30

== See also ==
- Dear You – the 1995 major label debut by Jawbreaker, which saw them break up shortly afterwards
