= Christopher Tignor =

American experimental composer

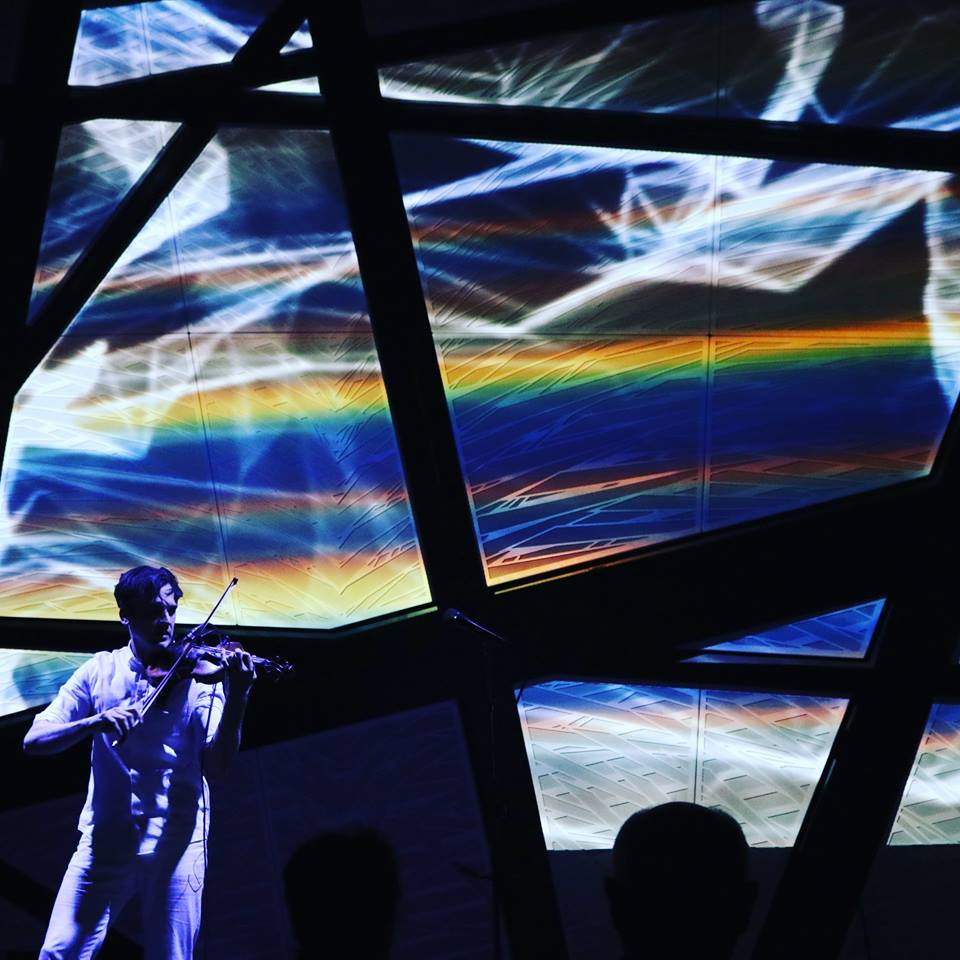
- Christopher Tignor performing at National Sawdust in Brooklyn, May 5, 2017.

Background information
- Genres: experimental music post-rock contemporary classical electronic music
- Occupations: composer, violinist, software engineer
- Labels: Western Vinyl, New Albion
- Website: http://wiresundertension.com

Christopher Tignor (born March 15, 1976) is an American composer, musician, and software engineer based in New York City. A founding member of post-rock acts Slow Six and Wires Under Tension, Tignor is primarily known for his solo work as an electro-acoustic violinist "making computers coexist in harmony with acoustic instruments in a live setting". Tignor has composed and recorded string arrangements for This Will Destroy You, John Congleton, Keith Kenniff, Lymbyc Systym, and more.

== Early life and career ==
Tignor was born in Morristown, New Jersey. In 1998 he received a Bachelor of Arts in creative writing from Bard College, where he studied with composer Richard Teitelbaum and poet John Ashbery; he continued to collaborate with both after graduating. In 2003 he received a Master of Science degree in computer science from New York University, and in 2018 he received a PhD in music composition from Princeton. While living and studying in New York City, Tignor worked as a bike messenger and assistant to LaMonte Young and Mariana Zazeela, in addition to running sound and stage-managing for CBGB's.

From 1999 to 2008, Tignor was sound engineer and then technical director for Music at the Anthology (founded by Philip Glass, Eleonor Sandresky, and Lisa Bielawa), and in 2007, Tignor and The Knights performed the world premiere of Tignor's MATA Commission at the festival. In 2007, BYU's Barlow Endowment for Music Composition commissioned Tignor to write a new work for Brooklyn Rider String Quartet; the piece later appeared on the quartet's favorably-reviewed Seven Steps and was performed at Carnegie's Zankel Hall.

Tignor formed post-rock band Slow Six in 2000, expanding the group to nine members by 2007's Nor'easter.

He has given lectures and performances at the SOU Festival in Tbilisi, Georgia, the International Computer Music Conference in Daegu, Korea, the Victor Hugo theater in Havana, Cuba, and numerous other venues. He has also collaborated with contemporary dance troupes, video artists, and poets.

Tignor has worked at Google as a software engineer since 2011, and creates most of the (open-source) software he uses for live performance. He is also a sponsored artist of audio software maker Antares for his application of Auto-Tune as a "chorale" violin harmonizer, and of German tuning fork maker Wittner for his use of the device in performances. In 2022, Tignor released a collaborative album with This Will Destroy You co-founder Christopher Royal King under the name Disassembler.

== Discography ==
=== Solo / As Leader ===
Release year	Leader	Title	Label	Notes
2026	Christopher Tignor	Bleeding Past the Edges	Western Vinyl	
2023	Christopher Tignor	The Art of Surrender	Western Vinyl	
2022	Disassembler	A Wave From A Shore	Western Vinyl	
2019	Christopher Tignor	A Light Below	Western Vinyl	
2016	Christopher Tignor	Along A Vanishing Plane	Western Vinyl	
2014	Christopher Tignor	Thunder Lay Down in the Heart	Western Vinyl	
2012	Wires.Under.Tension	Replicant	Western Vinyl	
2010	Wires.Under.Tension	Light Science	Western Vinyl	
2010	Slow Six	Tomorrow Becomes You	Western Vinyl	
2009	Christopher Tignor	Core Memory Unwound	Western Vinyl	
2007	Slow Six	Nor'easter	New Albion	
2004	Slow Six	Private Times in Public Places	Western Vinyl	

=== Composer / Performer ===
Release year	Leader	Title	Label	Notes
2016	John Congleton and the Nighty Nite	Until the Horror Goes	Fat Possum Records	
2016	Lymbyc Systym	Split Stones	Western Vinyl	
2014	Alexander Turnquist	Flying Fantasy	Western Vinyl	
2012	Brooklyn Rider	Seven Steps	In a Circle Records	"Together into this Unknowable Night"
2012	Lymbyc Systym	Symbolyst	Western Vinyl	
2011	This Will Destroy You	Tunnel Blanket	Suicide Squeeze Records	
2011	Alexander Turnquist	Hallway Of Mirrors	VHF Records	
2011	Various Artists	Five Borough Songbook	GPR Records	"Secret Assignation"
2009	Alexander Turnquist	As the Twilight Crane Dreams in Color	VHF	
2009	Lymbyc Systym	Shutter Release	Mush Records	
