= Christie Front Drive (EP) =

EP by Christie Front Drive
- Released: 1994
- Recorded: 25 December 1993, Time Capsule
- Genre: Indie rock, emo
- Length: 28:28
- Label: Freewill Records; Magic Bullet Records (reissue); Dark Operative (reissue)
- Producer: Christie Front Drive

Christie Front Drive chronology
Christie Front Drive (1994)	Anthology (1995)

Christie Front Drive is the debut EP released by the American indie rock/emo band, Christie Front Drive through Freewill Records in 1994. All the tracks were reissued on their next release, Anthology. The remastered edition was released on Magic Bullet Records on May 21, 2013.

== Track listing ==
1. "Turn" – 4:03
2. "Dyed on 8" – 5:20
3. "Long Out" – 4:13
4. "Lot" – 5:31
5. "Pipe" – 5:28
6. "Dirt" – 3:53

== Personnel ==
- Eric Richter – vocals, guitar
- Jason Begin – guitar
- Kerry McDonald – bass
- Ron Marschall – drums
