= Carved by Glaciers =

EP by Lymbyc Systym
- Released: March 24, 2006
- Genre: Post-rock electronica
- Length: 24:52; 32:34 (reissue)
- Label: Magic Bullet

Lymbyc Systym chronology
Carved by Glaciers (2006)	Love Your Abuser (2007)

Professional ratings
Review scores
Source	Rating
PunkNews	(4/5)
Scene Point Blank	(7/10)

Carved by Glaciers is the debut EP by American band Lymbyc Systym, released in 2006 on Magic Bullet Records. It was reissued in 2009 with two new bonus tracks.

== Track listing ==
No.	Title	Length
1.	"Lotan Baba"	6:15
2.	"Carved by Glaciers"	7:37
3.	"1000 Arms"	2:49
4.	"My Lost Last Step"	4:07
5.	"Selamat Pagi (Donna's Song)"	4:04
6.	"1000 Arms [Her Space Holiday Remix]" (Reissue Bonus Track)	3:24
7.	"Selamat Pagi [American Analog Set Remix]" (Reissue Bonus Track)	4:18
