= Field Studies (EP) =

EP (Split EP) by This Will Destroy You and Lymbyc Systym
- Released: January 5, 2009
- Recorded: July 2008, Elmwood Studios, Dallas, Texas; Uniform Recording, Philadelphia, Pennsylvania
- Genre: Post-rock, ambient
- Length: 26:21
- Label: Magic Bullet
- Producer: John Congleton

This Will Destroy You chronology
This Will Destroy You (2008)	Field Studies (2009)	Moving on the Edges of Things (2010)

Lymbyc Systym chronology
Love Your Abuser Remixed (2008)	Field Studies (2009)	Shutter Release (2009)

Professional ratings
Review scores
Source	Rating
Rock Sound	(8/10)

Field Studies is a split EP released on Magic Bullet in 2009. The first two tracks are performed by This Will Destroy You, with the last three performed by Lymbyc Systym.

== Track listing ==
No.	Title	Artist	Length
1.	"Brutalism & The Worship of the Machine"	This Will Destroy You	11:09
2.	"Freedom Blade"	This Will Destroy You	4:01
3.	"Processed Spirits"	Lymbyc Systym	4:16
4.	"Notations"	Lymbyc Systym	3:47
5.	"Narita"	Lymbyc Systym	3:08
Total length:			26:21

== Personnel ==
This Will Destroy You

- Jeremy Galindo - guitar
- Donovan Jones - bass guitar, keyboard
- Chris King - guitar
- Andrew Miller - drums

Lymbyc Systym

- Michael Bell - drums
- Jared Bell - keyboard

Additional musicians

- Mom - cello, violin (tracks 1 and 2)
- Michael Bryant - trombone (track 1)
- Warren Stewart - trumpet (track 1)
- Jeff Ziegler - guitar (track 4)
- Kevin Tangney - trumpet (track 3 and 4)
- Dylan Rieck - cello (track 4)

Production

- John Congleton - producer (tracks 1 and 2), mixer and engineer (tracks 1 and 2)
- This Will Destroy You - producers (track 1 and 2)
- Alan Douches - mastering
- Jeff Ziegler - recording (tracks 3,4 and 5)
- Lymbyc Systym - recording (tracks 3,4 and 5)
- Chris King - layout
- Jared Bell - layout
