= Mount Righteous =

American folk punk band

- Origin: Grapevine, Texas, United States
- Genre: Folk Punk
- Label: Righteous Records
- Members: Allison Wenban; Austin Bird; Cory Graves; Joey Kendall; Kendall Smith; Mason Ponder; Zicole Marxen; Lauren Wadsworth; Aubrey Ashenhart
- Past members: Lee Bond; Adam Neese; Casey Colby; Amber Elkins; Justin Spike; Mr. Clint Parker; Ashley Randall; Allison Wheeler; Esteban Silva; Laura Neeley; Derek Terry
- Website: http://mountrighteous.com

Mount Righteous is a band from Grapevine, Texas. They play a vibrant and eclectic indie-pop with a heavy emphasis on varied instrumentation. Their sound has been described as an acoustic-punk marching band and compared to other large collectives including I'm From Barcelona, Architecture In Helsinki, and fellow North Texas-based band The Polyphonic Spree.

== History ==
Their debut album, When The Music Starts, was released in 2008. Mount Righteous toured throughout the United States in support of the release of this album. The band released a five-song EP entitled Open Your Mouth on September 25, 2009. In January 2010, they recorded their sophomore release with producer John Congleton, who has worked with acts such as St. Vincent, Polyphonic Spree, and his own band The Paper Chase. Mount Righteous performed multiple sets at the 2009 and 2010 South by Southwest music festivals in Austin, Texas, including a set on the Lamar Boulevard Bridge which was attended by celebrity fan Bill Murray. Their debut album When the Music Starts was awarded the 'Big Album' trophy at the 2009 Big Thing Awards, hosted by Quick, a Dallas alternative weekly. Their eponymous second album was released on April 3, 2010, at Good Records in Dallas, and has been described as being more explosive and aggressive than their debut. In July 2010 the group was awarded a Dallas Observer Music Award in the category 'Best Experimental/Avant Garde Group'.

== Members ==
- Allison Wenban - Trombone, Baritone
- Austin Bird - Flute, Electric Guitar, Floor Tom
- Cory Graves - Trumpet, Baritone
- Joey Kendall - Bass Drum/Snare Drum
- Kendall Smith - Bells, Melodica, Screams
- Mason Ponder - Sousaphone, Trombone, Floor Tom
- Z Marxen - Cymbals, Percussion, Whistles, Melodica
- Lauren Wadsworth - Melodica, Misc. Percussion
- Aubrey Ashenhart - Trombone

== Discography ==
=== Albums ===
- When The Music Starts (2008)
- Open Your Mouth (2009)
- Mount Righteous (2010)
