= Mount Righteous (album) =

Studio album by Mount Righteous
- Released: April 3rd, 2010
- Genre: Polka Punk, Anti-Orchestra
- Length: 27:43
- Label: Righteous Records
- Producer: John Congleton

Mount Righteous chronology
Open Your Mouth (2009)	Mount Righteous (2010)

Mount Righteous is the second full-length album by Grapevine, Texas based band Mount Righteous, released on their label Righteous Records on April 3, 2010. It was produced by John Congleton of The Paper Chase. Pegasus News states that, "Each track is edgy and complex, which is something the band set out to accomplish from the outset. It is fair to say they have accomplished their goal. This album was a daring move, to make such a dramatic shift away from what we are used to hearing from them." The album is seen as a major progression in Mount Righteous' sound - from lighthearted on their first freshman release, When The Music Starts, as well the following Open Your Mouth EP - to a faster, wilder attitude. Their new sound has been labeled as both anti-orchestra by Mount Righteous themselves, as well as polka-punk in varying reviews of the album.

== Track listing ==
1. "We're Gone" - 1:45
2. "When Your Paycheck Comes" - 3:15
3. "Eat Your Wife And Kiss The Barbecue" - 4:44
4. "We're All Going Crazy" - 2:56
5. "Suburban Homesick Blues" - 2:14
6. "I Think I Need A Break" - 1:39
7. "Mesa Maravillosa" - 2:34
8. "Wish You The Best" - 1:52
9. "I Am Most Definitely Into You" - 2:48
10. "Where There's A Way" - 4:01
