= Christie Front Drive (album) =

Studio album by Christie Front Drive
- Released: April 4, 1997
- Recorded: May 15–17, 1996
- Studio: Idful, Chicago, Illinois
- Genre: Emo; indie rock
- Length: 32:29
- Label: Caulfield
- Producer: Andy Bryant

Christie Front Drive chronology
Anthology (1995)	Christie Front Drive (1997)

Professional ratings
Review scores
Source	Rating
AllMusic	2/5 stars
Punknews.org	3.5/5 stars

Christie Front Drive is the only studio album by the indie rock band Christie Front Drive. It was released in 1997 on Caulfield Records, and re-released by Magic Bullet Records as a remastered edition with a bonus DVD containing the band's final live performance in 1996. "Radio" appeared on a best-of emo songs list by Vulture.

== Music ==
Christie Front Drive has been called "one of the more expansive records of the genre." AllMusic described the style as "somewhere on the poppier end of emo (or the emo-ish end of indie-pop, depending on one's perspective)."

“Radio” was ranked number 18 on Vulture’s “100 Greatest Emo Songs of All Time” list (2020).

== Track listing ==
1. "Saturday" – 6:35
2. "Radio" – 3:49
3. Untitled – 0:42
4. "November" – 3:56
5. Untitled – 1:06
6. "Fin" – 4:30
7. "About Two Days" – 6:08
8. Untitled – 1:27
9. "Seven Day Candle" – 3:46
10. Untitled – 0:39

== Personnel ==
- Eric Richter – vocals, guitar
- Jason Begin – guitar
- Kerry McDonald – bass
- Ron Marschall – drums
