= Moneyball (soundtrack) =

Moneyball (Original Motion Picture Soundtrack)

Film score by Mychael Danna
- Released: September 19, 2011
- Recorded: February 2011
- Genre: Film score
- Length: 48:49
- Label: Madison Gate Records
- Producer: Mychael Danna

Mychael Danna chronology
Camelot (2011)	Moneyball (2011)	Life of Pi (2012)

Moneyball (Original Motion Picture Soundtrack) is the score album to the 2011 film Moneyball, directed by Bennett Miller and featuring music composed by Mychael Danna, who previously worked with Miller on his 2005 film, Capote. The album featuring 21 cues, as well as two songs: "The Mighty Rio Grande" by the rock band This Will Destroy You from their eponymous 2008 studio album commissioned by Danna for the film and a cover of Lenka's "The Show", performed by actress-singer Kerris Dorsey. Madison Gate Records released the album on September 19, 2011, four days before the film's release.

== Track listing ==
No.	Title	Singer(s)	Length
1.	"One Out Away"		1:48
2.	"A Little Bit of Faith"		1:09
3.	"Spring Training"		1:34
4.	"Big League"		2:20
5.	"Opening Day"		1:12
6.	"Losing Streak"		1:39
7.	"Can't Miss Prospect"		2:05
8.	"Time Tested Intangibles"		1:22
9.	"Is Losing Fun?"		0:53
10.	"Coaching"		1:01
11.	"It's a Process"		1:52
12.	"More"		1:37
13.	"The Streak"		3:03
14.	"Turn Around"		0:48
15.	"Old Ground"		4:26
16.	"Hattie"		1:25
17.	"Game 5"		1:08
18.	"Fenway"		1:30
19.	"The Offer"		0:41
20.	"Oakland"		1:12
21.	"On Its Head"		1:35
22.	"The Show"	Kerris Dorsey	3:13
23.	"The Mighty Rio Grande"	This Will Destroy You	11:16
Total length:			48:49

== Reception ==
Calling it as "one of the finer scores of the year", Rodrigo Perez of IndieWire wrote "Like the film, the score is really inspirational, but within the picture, it's often used as quiet emotional background texture; it's an effective, moody work, but it's not necessarily a really showy or noticeable score either." For the same website, Oliver Lyttelton listing it as one of the "best scores of 2011" wrote "The slow-burn rhythm of "Moneyball," which eventually hits one right out of the park, is a well-earned and triumphant jog across all four bases and Danna's stirring compositions are a key part of its heart and soul."

Jonathan Broxton wrote "While fans of more strident and theme-driven works may find Danna's restrained approach a little unapproachable and even a touch boring, for those who enjoy a more classically-oriented score with a touch of contemporary minimalism, Moneyball is worth a download for its 30 minutes of score." Filmtracks.com wrote "Danna's focus on the cool, statistical element is barely functional and essentially fails to tell any kind of narrative to compete in any regard with other scores about sports perseverance, family challenges, or even statistical genius (James Horner's rhythmic representations of genius are infinitely superior). The album contains 34 minutes of score that will be difficult to embrace, though it at least has few moments of turmoil to upset the tepid but smooth listening experience. While nobody should have expected music like Randy Newman's classic The Natural to grace this film, it's hard not to get the feeling that the score was intentionally buried in a movie that could have used a few more doses of whimsy. Despite the ruthless statistical aspect to baseball, it is still a kid's game."

== Accolades ==
Danna's original score for Moneyball was intended to be a possible contender for Best Original Score at the 84th Academy Awards but wasn't shortlisted. He did however win the "Film Music Award" at the 2012 BMI Film & TV Awards.

== Credits ==
Credits adapted from CD liner notes.

- Music composed and produced – Mychael Danna
- Additional music – Rob Simonsen
- Musical assistance – Duncan Blickenstaff
- Piano – Robert Thies
- Recording, mixing – Brad Haehnel
- Mastering – Patricia Sullivan
- Music editor – Kevin Crehan, Thomas Milano
- Music co-ordinator – Tim Ahlering
- Art direction and design – Elizabeth Prochnow
- Orchestration – Dan Parr, Mychael Danna, Nicholas Dodd
- Conductor – Nicholas Dodd
- Executive producer – Bennett Miller, Michael De Luca, Scott Rudin
- Executive in charge of music – Lia Vollack
