= Another Language (album) =

Studio album by This Will Destroy You
- Released: September 12, 2014
- Recorded: 2013–14
- Genre: Post-rock; doom metal; shoegaze; ambient; drone
- Length: 47:01
- Label: Suicide Squeeze, Hobbledehoy
- Producer: John Congleton

This Will Destroy You chronology
Live in Reykjavik, Iceland (2013)	Another Language (2014)	New Others Part One (2018)

Singles from Another Language
- 1. "Dustism" Released: June 23, 2014; 2. "Invitation" Released: August 11, 2014

Another Language is the fourth studio album by American post-rock band This Will Destroy You. It was released on September 12, 2014, by Suicide Squeeze Records and Hobbledehoy Record Co. Another Language was preceded by the digital release of two singles, "Dustism" and "Invitation".

== Background and production ==
According to a press release published by Suicide Squeeze Records, the album was recorded after a "prolonged vacuous dark period that threatened to break both the band and the members themselves". In February 2013, one of the band's guitarists, Jeremy Galindo, said that the band had started writing the next studio album. Nine months later, the band said they were halfway done with the recording process. In February 2014, the band's bassist Donovan Jones reported that they were still working on the album. This is the last album to feature Donovan Jones and Alex Bhore after they left the band in late May 2016.

== Composition ==
According to the band, Another Language's sound is "more upbeat and rhythmic" than their previous work. They also described the sound of the album with the genre "doomgaze", a portmanteau of the words doom metal and shoegaze. Fred Thomas of AllMusic described the sound of the album as "far heavier" than the "tense, brooding post-rock" on the band's previous work. He characterized the sound of Another Language as "cinematic" post-rock influenced by doom metal and shoegaze, and called the production "more intricate" and "otherworldly". Thomas also praised the band's "always airtight sense of dynamics". Matt Bobkin of Exclaim! labeled the album's sound as post-rock, but acknowledged that the band seemed to be moving away from that sound.

The album's first track, "New Topia", "grows from laid-back rhythms and gentle bell sounds into a slow, pounding wail". Thomas found that the production of the track was influenced by drone metal, and the other sounds "blur into a hungry wash of delay and toothy noise". "Dustism" was characterized by "dubbed-out drums and high-pitched feedback synths", while "Invitation" features "rolling, distorted rhythms and faraway guitar sounds". "Serpent Mound" features an ambient opening followed by "face-melting melodic guitar lines with a solid wave of fuzzy, distorted sound and crashing drums", described by Bobkin as "doomgaze". The album's closing track, "God's Teeth", features ambient sounds that were compared to the works of Brian Eno and William Basinski.

== Release and promotion ==
The release and album artwork of the album were announced on June 23, 2014, with the release of the first single, "Dustism". The album's second single, "Invitation", was released on August 11. Another Language was made available for streaming through Pitchfork Media on September 8. A video to accompany the album was directed by Sean Miller and Christopher Royal King.

Prior to the album release, This Will Destroy You announced a worldwide concert and festival tour, with support from Future Death and Silent Land Time Machine in North America, and Thought Forms and Lymbyc Systym in Europe.

== Critical reception ==
Professional ratings
Aggregate scores
Source	Rating
Metacritic	72/100
Review scores
Source	Rating
AllMusic	4/5 stars
Alternative Press	3.5/5 stars
Consequence of Sound	B−
Exclaim!	7/10
Kerrang!	3/5 stars
Pitchfork Media	7.2/10
PopMatters	6/10

Another Language received positive reviews upon its release. According to Metacritic, which assigns a normalized rating out of 100 to reviews from mainstream critics, the album held a score of 72/100 based on nine reviews—indicating "generally favorable reviews"—following its release. Fred Thomas of AllMusic, who gave the album four out of five stars, complimented the band's "more intricate, otherworldly production methods" and ability to write intense songs that are not "overly long". He praised the closing track of the album, "God's Teeth", calling it "gorgeous and haunting". Matt Bobkin of Exclaim!, who gave the album seven out of ten points, criticized the album for its long ambient segments in the middle of the record, but praised the following tracks, "Invitation" and "Memory Loss".

== Track listing ==
Standard edition
No.	Title	Length
1.	"New Topia"	5:28
2.	"Dustism"	6:19
3.	"Serpent Mound"	5:07
4.	"War Prayer"	7:34
5.	"The Puritan"	3:01
6.	"Mother Opiate"	4:45
7.	"Invitation"	4:07
8.	"Memory Loss"	6:00
9.	"God's Teeth"	4:40
Total length:		47:01

Japanese edition (bonus tracks)
No.	Title	Length
10.	"Their Celebrations"	6:03
11.	"Golden Wheel"	4:45

== Personnel ==
This Will Destroy You

- Jeremy Galindo – guitar
- Donovan Jones – bass
- Chris King – guitar
- Alex Bhore – drums

Additional musicians

- Jon Slade - strings

Credits adapted from Holodeck Records and Pitchfork Media.

- Alex Bhore - recording
- John Congleton - production, recording, mixing
- Alan Douches - mastering
- Jeremy Galindo - mixing
- Christopher King - recording, mixing
- Land - art

== Charts ==
Chart (2014)	Peak position
US Heatseekers Albums (Billboard)	7

== Release history ==
Country	Date	Format(s)	Label	Ref.
Austria	September 12, 2014	Digital download	Suicide Squeeze	
Finland	September 12, 2014	Digital download	Suicide Squeeze	
Germany	September 12, 2014	Digital download	Suicide Squeeze	
Ireland	September 12, 2014	Digital download	Suicide Squeeze	
Netherlands	September 12, 2014	Digital download	Suicide Squeeze	
Switzerland	September 12, 2014	Digital download	Suicide Squeeze	
France	September 15, 2014	Digital download; CD; 2LP	Suicide Squeeze	
Belgium	September 15, 2014	Digital download	Suicide Squeeze	
Italy	September 15, 2014	Digital download	Suicide Squeeze	
Luxembourg	September 15, 2014	Digital download	Suicide Squeeze	
Portugal	September 15, 2014	Digital download	Suicide Squeeze	
Spain	September 15, 2014	Digital download	Suicide Squeeze	
Sweden	September 15, 2014	Digital download	Suicide Squeeze	
United Kingdom	September 15, 2014	Digital download; CD	Suicide Squeeze	
Australia	September 16, 2014	Digital download; CD; 2LP	Hobbledehoy	
Canada	September 16, 2014	Digital download	Suicide Squeeze	
New Zealand	September 16, 2014	Digital download; CD; 2LP	Hobbledehoy	
Norway	September 16, 2014	Digital download	Suicide Squeeze	
Singapore	September 16, 2014	Digital download	Suicide Squeeze	
United States	September 16, 2014	Digital download; CD; 2LP; cassette	Suicide Squeeze / Holodeck	
Japan	October 22, 2014	—N/a	& Records	
