= Field Studies =

Field Studies may refer to:

- Field Studies (album), a 1999 album by Quasi
- Field Studies (EP), a 2009 split EP by This Will Destroy You and Lymbyc Systym
- Field Studies Council, an educational charity based in the UK
- Field study or field research, information collected outside a laboratory or workplace setting
- Do Nothing (band), an English post-punk band formerly known as Field Studies
