= TWDY =

TWDY may refer to:

- This Will Destroy You, an American avant-rock band
- The Whole Damn Yay, an American hip hop supergroup formed by Ant Banks
