= This Will Destroy You (album) =

Studio album by This Will Destroy You
- Released: January 29, 2008
- Recorded: February 2007
- Studios: Pedernales Studios, Spicewood, Texas; Nomad Studios, Dallas, Texas
- Genres: Post-rock; ambient
- Length: 51:30
- Label: Magic Bullet
- Producer: John Congleton

This Will Destroy You chronology
Young Mountain (2006)	This Will Destroy You (2008)	Field Studies (2009)

Professional ratings
Review scores
Source	Rating
AbsolutePunk	(90%)
Decibel	(8/10)
Drowned in Sound	(8/10)
Rock Sound	(9/10)
StrangeGlue.com	8/10 stars

This Will Destroy You is the second studio album by American avant-rock band This Will Destroy You. It was released on January 29, 2008, through Magic Bullet Records.

== Track listing ==
All tracks are written by This Will Destroy You.

No.	Title	Length
1.	"A Three-Legged Workhorse"	9:12
2.	"Villa Del Refugio"	7:06
3.	"Threads"	5:41
4.	"Leather Wings"	3:30
5.	"The Mighty Rio Grande"	11:18
6.	"They Move on Tracks of Never-Ending Light"	6:59
7.	"Burial on the Presidio Banks"	7:44
Total length:		51:30

== Personnel ==
This Will Destroy You

- Jeremy Galindo - guitar
- Raymond Brown - bass guitar, keyboard
- Chris King - guitar
- Andrew Miller - drums

Additional musicians

- Stephanie McVeigh - cello (tracks 1, 5 and 7)

Production

- John Congleton - producer, engineer and mixer
- This Will Destroy You - producers
- Alan Douches - mastering

== Appearances in popular culture ==
- "Burial on the Presidio Banks" was featured in the final scene of the CSI: Miami episode "Flight Risk".
- "They Move on Tracks of Never-Ending Light" was used as part of an NBC introductory film narrated by Tom Brokaw which overviews Canada for the 2010 Winter Olympics, it was also used in the 2012 independent film The Diary of Preston Plummer starring Trevor Morgan.
- "The Mighty Rio Grande" was used prominently throughout the 2011 film Moneyball; in a tribute video by American web-based production company Rooster Teeth to the late Monty Oum, creator of the popular web series RWBY in February 2015; in the 2014 science-fiction film Earth to Echo; in the 2013 film Lone Survivor; in the 2015 film Room; in the 2016 television show Lethal Weapon; in a Verizon commercial that played during Super Bowl LIII; and in the season finale of Welcome to Wrexham: Season 4 (2025) episode "Do a Wrexham".
- "Villa Del Refugio" was featured in a World War Z scene.
- "The Mighty Rio Grande" was featured in an ESPN 30 for 30 about the 1985 Chicago Bears.
- A 2017 video set a timed Line Rider track to the entirety of the album, gaining over three million views on YouTube.
