= Someday This Could All Be Yours Vol. 1 =

2009 album by The Paper Chase

Studio album by The Paper Chase
- Released: May 26, 2009
- Genres: Noise pop; indie rock
- Length: 46:39
- Labels: Kill Rock Stars; Southern
- Producer: John Congleton

The Paper Chase chronology
| Now You Are One of Us (2006) | Someday This Could All Be Yours Vol. 1 (2009) |

Someday This Could All Be Yours Vol. 1 (Note: Sometimes referred to as Someday This Could All Be Yours (The Calamities Vol. 1) in physical copies.) is the fifth and final studio album by the American noise pop band The Paper Chase. It was released through Kill Rock Stars on May 26, 2009. Written by producer and frontman John Congleton, the concept album centers on humanity's destruction through natural disasters with celebratory existential themes. In contrast to the band's earlier discography, emphasis was shifted away from recurring motifs and transitions in favor of more individualized songs. It was originally conceived as the first half of a two-part concept album.

The album was announced on March 18, 2009, while a release concert preceded its commercial launch. A visualizer for the song "What Should We Do with Your Body (The Lightning)" later followed on June 19. Although the second volume was mostly completed, Congleton ultimately shelved it, and the Paper Chase disbanded. He continued under the name The Nighty Nite, whose debut EP incorporated material originally intended for the unreleased second volume.

Upon release, Someday This Could All Be Yours Vol. 1 received mixed reviews from critics. Reviewers widely praised Congleton's lyrical ambition, his production, and Jason Garner's drumming, with several highlighting the opening track as one of the band's strongest songs. Others criticized the album's relentlessly unsettling atmosphere, repetitive instrumentation, and perceived lack of artistic progression.

== Background and writing ==
When writing albums for the Paper Chase, producer and frontman John Congleton often created songs that shared lyrical themes and motifs. He lost interest in creating songs that functioned only as transitions over time, opting to write songs on the side that prioritized individual relistenability. He drafted an album focused on his acceptance of the world falling apart and finding solace in existentialism, describing it as "a very celebratory album" while theming it around natural disasters to create a concept album. Like the band's previous works, Congleton heavily used metaphors to allow audience interpretation, stating "once I make a record, it belongs to everyone else just as much as it does to me". The writing process started before the production of the Paper Chase's fourth album, Now You Are One of Us (2006).

The opening song, "If Nobody Moves Nobody Will Get Hurt (The Extinction)", was inspired by his revelation about human inability to control the world. "The Common Cold (The Epidemic)" revolves around a fear of intimacy and commitment issues, while "What Should We Do with Your Body (The Lightning)" was written about having repetition compulsion towards harmful limerence. "The Small of Your Back the Nape of Your Neck (The Blizzard)" discusses the negative effects of dogma, and "This Is Only a Test (The Tornado)" acts as a criticism of late capitalism. The album additionally uses biblical imagery, inspired by Congleton growing up around religious influences and disconnecting from Christianity in adulthood. He primarily composed it on acoustic guitar in contrast to his usual method of piano writing.

== Recording and production ==
The project's recording began when the band's label, Kill Rock Stars, requested that Congleton release a solo album. He agreed, feeling that the Paper Chase was close to ending due to their drummer, Aryn Dalton, quitting the band. However, the recruitment of drummer Jason Garner for live performances sparked renewed interest in staying together, leading them to record the album. In October 2006, Kill Rock Stars owner Slim Moon departed from the label and gave ownership to his wife, Portia Sabin. The new chairwoman requested that Congleton not release a solo album. In an interview with Punknews in early 2007, Congleton stated he had recently written a full album. Following its completion, he described the album as the only studio recordings of the Paper Chase he was mostly happy with, considering the rest of their discography as largely failing to be what he wanted.

The band recorded a second album alongside the first, planning to release them separately as parts of Someday This Will All Be Yours, a title taken from a lyric. It was later retitled Someday This Could All Be Yours and initially planned for a fall 2008 release, while the second volume was scheduled for a 2010 release after being fully written, mostly recorded, and partially mixed. For the cover art of the first volume, Congleton contacted artist Daniel Delpurgatorio, who had previously worked with the band on other albums. He gave the prompt to create "somebody being thrown powerlessly through the air", which Delpurgatorio created using photograph manipulation to insert a person seemingly being carried by a tornado. This concept was designed to "illustrate how helpless we are in the face of such catastrophes".

== Release ==
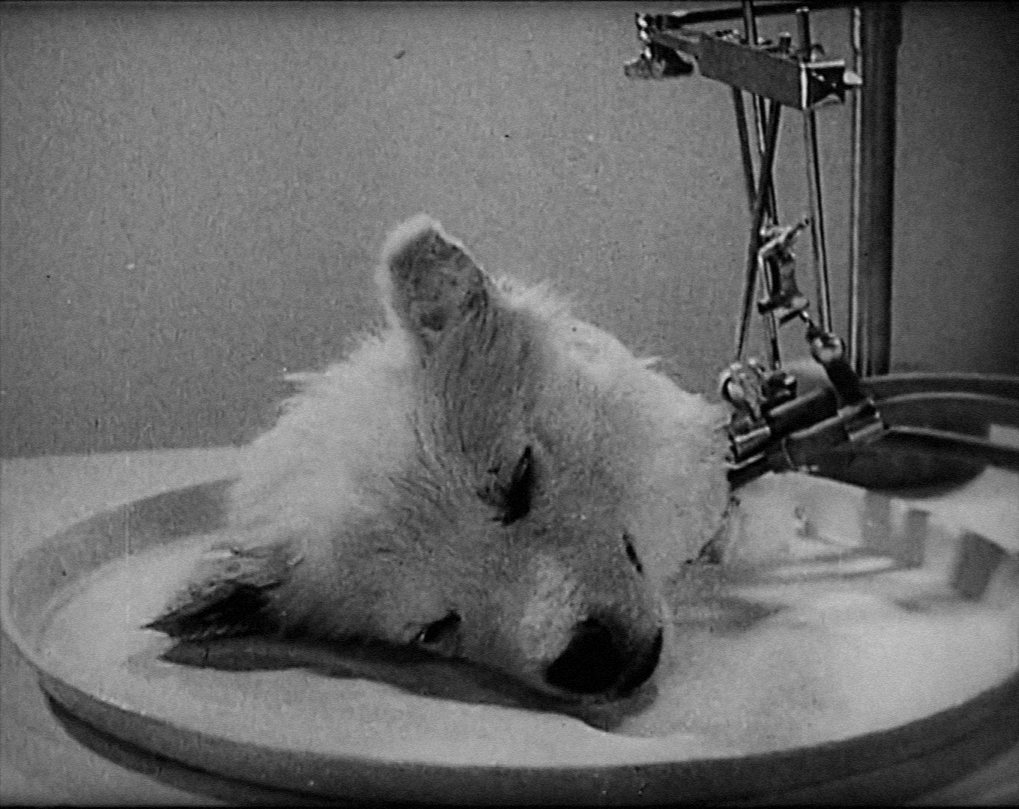
Experiments in the Revival of Organisms, a film used in the visualizer for "What Should We Do with Your Body (The Lightning)"

Various songs from their upcoming album were performed at concerts in 2008, including "What Should We Do With Your Body (The Lightning)", and a live acoustic performance at a record store that was posted to YouTube. On March 18, 2009, the Paper Chase announced their fifth and sixth studio albums as Someday This Could All Be Yours, a two-part concept album that would "explore the existential crisis inherent within a universe seemingly fated to exterminate its population". An album release concert took place on May 23, 2009, where CDs were available for purchase early. Someday This Could All Be Yours Vol. 1 was released in the United States through Kill Rock Stars on May 26, 2009, and distributed through Southern Records in the United Kingdom. On June 19, a visualizer for "What Should We Do with Your Body (The Lightning)" featuring public domain footage was released on YouTube. A tour for the album began in June, continuing through July in the United States. This was followed by a European tour in autumn.

Concerts for the album were heavy on theatrics, with Congleton employing a manic stage presence and using suicidal and evangelical imagery. This was accompanied by intermittent sampling, including the Peoples Temple Death Tape. All shows for the tour ended without encores. Congleton described the second volume of Someday This Could All Be Yours as "an extremely heavy, depressive, slow record", detesting the idea of the band ending with such a downbeat album and finding it symbolic to set expectations and suddenly not follow through, aligning with the band's lyrical themes of death. He found further frustration from reviews of the first volume, feeling tired of his music being misinterpreted as severely depressing. After the release of the first volume, bassist Bobby Weaver and keyboardist Sean Kirkpatrick left the band. Congleton subsequently retired the Paper Chase, with his continuation of the band solely dependent upon the return of Weaver.

Congleton continued making music as The Nighty Nite, which retained drummer Jason Garner and recruited other musicians from prior session work. Following the band's formation, he strongly emphasized that it was purely a name change without any creative shift. Their four-song debut EP Dimples (2011) included tracks from the scrapped second volume of Someday This Could All Be Yours, as well as unused older material and a cover of the Magnetic Fields' "Meaningless". He found it hard to maintain the band after a short tour, expressing uncertainty in making a full album as the Nighty Nite. He later released the album Until the Horror Goes (2016) under the new moniker John Congleton and the Nighty Nite, consisting solely of material written between 2014 and 2015. Surrounding its release, he affirmed that the second volume of Someday This Could All Be Yours would not see a full release.

== Critical reception ==
Professional ratings
Review scores
| Source | Rating |
|---|---|
| Consequence | D− |
| éclat | 4.5/5 stars |
| NME | 1.5/5 stars |
| Pitchfork | 6.8/10 |
| PopMatters | 7/10 |
| Punknews | 4.5/5 stars |
| Spectrum Culture | 4/5 stars |
| The Line of Best Fit | 79% |
| Tiny Mix Tapes | 3/5 stars |

According to the review aggregator Metacritic, Someday This Could All Be Yours Vol. 1 received "mixed or average reviews" based on a weighted average score of 59 out of 100 from six critic scores. Critics consistently praised "If Nobody Moves Nobody Will Get Hurt (The Extinction)", with Eric Schneider of AllMusic characterizing the track as encompassing the band's unique take on indie rock. It was highlighted as establishing the album through its intense, gradual development, using a climactic "triumphant assault of strings and guitar". The song ends with isolated drums growing increasingly louder, drawing comparisons to a funeral march. Its melodies were additionally likened to those of Ben E. King's song "Stand By Me". In a negative review of Someday This Could All Be Yours Vol. 1 by Alex Young of Consequence, the track's lyricism was singled out for approval as a "clever and biting indictment".

Several reviewers found the album more accessible than the band's other work, attributing this to its lack of found footage interludes and greater emphasis on melody. Described as the Paper Chase's most overtly pop-oriented album, Sam Shepherd of The Line of Best Fit praised its arrangements and theme as the best of their discography. Josh of Punknews extensively lauded its meticulously crafted songs, avoidance of clichés and artificiality commonly associated with darker music, and inventive use of piano and sound effects, predicting it to be the best album of Summer 2009. The album's conceptual coherence and Congleton's dissonant compositions received further commendation, with Morgan Davis of Spectrum Culture highlighting the first half of the album as "perfectly sequenced" but finding the second half unable to match its momentum. Dave Gurney of Tiny Mix Tapes complimented the powerful drumming and production, while Jan Martens of éclat praised its juxtaposition of abrasive dissonance with melodic beauty.

Ian Cohen of Pitchfork and Young criticized the Paper Chase's lack of development or artistic progression, noting the album rehashed the distinctive style they established earlier in their career. Pete Freedman of the Dallas Observer countered Cohen's review, arguing that it overlooked the importance of the disaster-themed concept and misinterpreted the contextual purpose of its anthemic songwriting. The constant unsettling atmosphere of Someday This Could All Be Yours Vol. 1 received further objection from critics. Some found it overbearing, while others described the album's instrumentation as tame and repetitive. Kev Kharas of NME similarly found its lyrics to be exhausting, writing "I just want to hit him until he stops talking", while Young argued that the nihilistic topics were presented without further depth.

Roxanna Hadadi of The Washington Post lauded the album's haunting soundscape paired with Congleton's "poetic, desperate lyrics", likening the melody of "The Common Cold (The Epidemic)" to Psycho's shower scene and singling out "I'm Going to Heaven with or Without You (The Forest Fire)" as the best song of Someday This Could All Be Yours Vol. 1. Brandon Bussolini of Dusted Magazine lauded Congleton's "mystifying" lyrics and voice, comparing him to Hutch Harris and Jamie Stewart. Werner Schröttner of The Gap commended Congleton's vocal performance, pairing his frightening songwriting with harsh and rhythmical compositions. Adam Davis of Mother Jones praised the album as being far scarier than Marilyn Manson's music, describing it as a "highly unique nightmare soundtrack". Matt Stroud of Pittsburgh City Paper lauded Congleton's complex lyrical references as complementary to the band's avant-garde instrumentation, calling attention to the latter's intense atmosphere during live performances.

== Track listing ==
All tracks written by John Congleton. All tracks are stylized in lowercase.

Someday This Could All Be Yours Vol. 1 track listing
| No. | Title | Length |
|---|---|---|
| 1. | "If Nobody Moves Nobody Will Get Hurt (The Extinction)" | 5:53 |
| 2. | "I'm Going to Heaven with or Without You (The Forest Fire)" | 4:48 |
| 3. | "The Common Cold (The Epidemic)" | 3:34 |
| 4. | "The Laying of Hands the Speaking in Tongues (The Mass Hysteria) (Note: Listed in digital copies of the album as "The Laying of Hands the Speaking of Tongues (The Mass Hysteria)".)" | 2:52 |
| 5. | "Your Money or Your Life (The Comet)" | 4:31 |
| 6. | "What Should We Do with Your Body (The Lightning) (Note: Listed in some digital copies of the album as "What Should We Do" (stylized in start case).)" | 6:07 |
| 7. | "This Is a Rape (The Flood)" | 3:52 |
| 8. | "The Small of Your Back the Nape of Your Neck (The Blizzard)" | 3:42 |
| 9. | "This Is Only a Test (The Tornado)" | 7:01 |
| 10. | "We Have Ways to Make You Talk (The Human Condition)" | 4:14 |

== Personnel ==
Credits for Someday This Could All Be Yours Vol. 1 adapted from liner notes.

The Paper Chase

- John Congleton – lead vocals, guitar, production, engineer
- Bobby Weaver – bass guitar
- Sean Kirkpatrick – keyboard
- Jason Garner – drums

Additional personnel

- Kris Youmans – cello
- Becki Fares – violin
- Doug Edwards – violin
- Alan Douches – mastering engineer
- Daniel Delpurgatorio – artwork
