= Young Mountain =

Studio album by This Will Destroy You
- Released: June 6, 2006 (CD); December 19, 2006 (cassette); March 13, 2007 (vinyl)
- Recorded: Rhapsody Street Studios, San Antonio, Texas, United States
- Genre: Post-rock, instrumental rock
- Length: 36:06
- Label: Magic Bullet

This Will Destroy You chronology
| Young Mountain (2006) | This Will Destroy You (2008) |

Professional ratings
Review scores
| Source | Rating |
|---|---|
| The Austin Chronicle | 3/5 stars |
| Pitchfork Media | (6.9/10) |
| Punknews | 4/5 stars |
| Rock Sound | (8/10) |

Young Mountain is the debut studio album by the American band This Will Destroy You. It was originally self-recorded and self-released in 2005, and was intended to be a demo to be sold after local shows. Although it was then only available as a CD-R, the album began to receive press mentions. The band soon attracted the attention of Magic Bullet Records, who repackaged the record and released it in CD format in June 2006. This was followed by a cassette release in December of the same year and a vinyl release the following March. The album has generally received positive reviews, including being named best album of 2006 by the editor of Rock Sound magazine, Darren Taylor.

On October 28, 2016 This Will Destroy You announced that they would be re-releasing the album on CD and LP for its 10th anniversary through Magic Bullet Records. It also comes with a previously unreleased track from the Young Mountain sessions titled "Sleep".

== Use of songs in other media ==
Tracks from Young Mountain have often been used in popular media. Most notably, "There are Some Remedies Worse Than the Disease" was used in the trailer for the 2009 film The Taking of Pelham 123, "I Believe in Your Victory" was used in the 2008 horror film Prom Night and "Quiet" featured in the documentary film William Kunstler: Disturbing the Universe. Tracks from it were also used during a presentation at the Pentagon about Hurricane Katrina. The song "Quiet" was also used in a trailer for the film The Purge and in the closing of the ESPN documentary The Fab Five.

== Track listing ==
All tracks are written by This Will Destroy You.

| No. | Title | Length |
|---|---|---|
| 1. | "Quiet" | 4:53 |
| 2. | "The World Is Our ___" | 7:12 |
| 3. | "I Believe in Your Victory" | 6:32 |
| 4. | "Grandfather Clock" | 2:37 |
| 5. | "Happiness: We're All in It Together" | 8:34 |
| 6. | "There Are Some Remedies Worse Than the Disease" | 6:18 |
| Total length: | | 36:06 |

10th anniversary bonus track
| No. | Title | Length |
|---|---|---|
| 7. | "Sleep" | 2:55 |

== Personnel ==
This Will Destroy You

- Jeremy Galindo - guitar
- Raymond Brown - bass guitar, keyboard
- Chris King - guitar, artwork
- Andrew Miller - drums

Additional musicians

- Jeremy Strom - violin (tracks 5 and 6)
