= Hide the Kitchen Knives =

2002 album by The Paper Chase

Studio album by The Paper Chase
- Released: August 6, 2002
- Length: 48:05

The Paper Chase chronology
| Young Bodies Heal Quickly, You Know (2000) | Hide the Kitchen Knives (2002) | God Bless Your Black Heart (2004) |

Professional ratings
Review scores
| Source | Rating |
|---|---|
| Allmusic | 4.5/5 stars |

Hide the Kitchen Knives is an album by American rock band The Paper Chase.

== Track listing ==
All tracks are written by John Congleton.

Hide the Kitchen Knives track listing
| No. | Title | Length |
|---|---|---|
| 1. | "I Did a Terrible Thing" | 5:37 |
| 2. | "Where Have Those Hands Been?" | 3:51 |
| 3. | "I'm Gonna Spend the Rest of My Life Lying" | 5:26 |
| 4. | "A Nice Family Dinner for Once" | 0:33 |
| 5. | "Don't You Wish You Had Somemore" | 4:53 |
| 6. | "I Tried So Hard to Be Good" | 1:07 |
| 7. | "A Little Place Called Trust" | 5:55 |
| 8. | "Sleep with the Fishes" | 1:51 |
| 9. | "So, How Goes the Good Fight" | 4:55 |
| 10. | "God Forgive Us All" | 1:24 |
| 11. | "AliverAlungAkidneyAthumb" | 4:36 |
| 12. | "Drive Carefully, Dear" | 2:36 |
| 13. | "Out Come the Knives" | 5:26 |
