= Live in Reykjavik =

Live in Reykjavik may refer to:

- Live in Reykjavik (Psychic TV album)
- Live in Reykjavik, Iceland album by This Will Destroy You 2013
- Live In Reykjavik Mezzoforte (band) (2007)
- Austurbaejarbio (Live In Reykjavik 1983) The Fall discography Paul Hanley (musician)
