= Antarctica (band) =

American indie rock band

- Origin: New York City, New York, U.S.
- Genres: Indie rock, post-rock, shoegaze, electronica, experimental rock
- Years active: 1995–1999
- Label: File 13
- Past members: Eric Richter; Chris Donohue; Ben Zimmerman; Glenn Maryansky; Nicole Waxenblatt

Antarctica was an American indie rock band from New York, existing from 1995 until 1999, generally considered post-rock, shoegazing, or electronica, having been compared with early Cure. Their output consisted of two well-regarded releases, and individual members have been in other bands before and since Antarctica.

== Members ==
- Eric Richter (formerly of Christie Front Drive) – vocals, guitar
- Chris Donohue (subsequently in Ova Looven) – vocals, guitar, programming
- Ben Zimmerman – bass
- Glenn Maryansky (subsequently in Blacklist and Ova Looven) – drums
- Nicole Waxenblatt – keyboards, programming, mixing

== Discography ==
- 23:03 (1997, EP, File 13)
- 81:03 (1999, 2xCD, File 13)
