= New Others Part One =

Studio album by This Will Destroy You
- Released: September 28, 2018
- Recorded: 2017–18
- Genre: Post-rock; shoegaze; ambient; drone
- Length: 38:06
- Label: Dark Operative
- Producer: John Congleton

This Will Destroy You chronology
Another Language (2014)	New Others Part One (2018)	New Others Part Two (2018)

Singles from New Others Part One
- 1. "Go Away Closer" Released: September 6, 2018

Professional ratings
Review scores
Source	Rating
Austin Chronicle	3/5 stars

New Others Part One is the fifth studio album by American post-rock band This Will Destroy You. It was released on September 28, 2018, by Dark Operative.

== Release and promotion ==
The album title and release date was announced on September 6, 2018. "Go Away Closer" was released as a single the same day.

== Track listing ==
All tracks are written by This Will Destroy You.

No.	Title	Length
1.	"Melted Jubilee"	4:45
2.	"To Win, Somebody's Got to Lose"	5:52
3.	"Syncage"	4:58
4.	"Allegiance"	4:24
5.	"Weeping Window"	6:59
6.	"Like This"	4:33
7.	"Go Away Closer"	6:35
Total length:		38:06

== Personnel ==
This Will Destroy You

- Jeremy Galindo – guitar
- Christopher King – guitar, additional engineering on tracks 4 and 6
- Robi Gonzalez – drums
- Jesse Kees – bass, keyboards

Production

- Produced, engineered, and mixed by John Congleton
- Additional engineering by Sean Cook
