= Moving on the Edges of Things =

EP by This Will Destroy You
- Released: August 10, 2010
- Genre: Drone, ambient, post-rock
- Length: 14:18
- Label: Magic Bullet

This Will Destroy You chronology
Field Studies (2009)	Moving on the Edges of Things (2010)	Tunnel Blanket (2011)

Professional ratings
Review scores
Source	Rating
Rock Sound	(7/10)
RVA Magazine	(positive)

Moving on the Edges of Things is an EP by the American band This Will Destroy You. It was released on August 10, 2010 through Magic Bullet Records, although it was available on the label's website from July. It was released on 12" vinyl, with the first, and currently only, pressing limited to 1000 copies.

== Track listing ==
All tracks are written by This Will Destroy You.

No.	Title	Length
1.	"Woven Tears"	4:53
2.	"Rituals"	9:33
Total length:		14:18

== Personnel ==
This Will Destroy You

- Jeremy Galindo - guitar
- Donovan Jones - bass, keyboard
- Chris King - guitar
- Alex Bhore - drums

Production

- Alex Bhore - audio recorder and mixer
- Chris King - additional recording
- Rob Wechsler - mastering
