= Anthology (Christie Front Drive album) =

Compilation album by Christie Front Drive
- Released: 10 October 1995
- Recorded: 1993–1995
- Genre: Indie rock, emo
- Length: 46:57
- Label: Caulfield Records
- Producer: Christie Front Drive

Christie Front Drive chronology
Christie Front Drive (1994)	Anthology (1995)	Christie Front Drive (1996)

Professional ratings
Review scores
Source	Rating
AllMusic	3/5 stars

Anthology is a compilation album by American indie rock/emo band Christie Front Drive. The album was released in 1995 by Caulfield Records. It is a compilation of the band's first 12" and 7" releases up to 1995, however excluding the three songs from their split EP with Boys Life.

== Track listing ==
1. "Turn" – 4:03
2. "Dyed on 8" – 5:05
3. "Long Out" – 4:28
4. "Lot" – 5:33
5. "Pipe" – 5:27
6. "Dirt" – 3:54
7. "Slide" – 5:20
8. "Now I Do" – 4:10
9. "4010" – 5:02
10. "Away" – 3:55

== Personnel ==
- Eric Richter – vocals, guitar
- Jason Begin – guitar, screams on "Long Out" and "Away"
- Kerry McDonald – bass, vocals
- Ron Marschall – drums
