= God Bless Your Black Heart =

2004 album by The Paper Chase

Studio album by The Paper Chase
- Released: June 8, 2004
- Genre: Noise rock; avant-garde rock
- Length: 52:45
- Label: Kill Rock Stars
- Producer: John Congleton

The Paper Chase chronology
Hide the Kitchen Knives (2002)	God Bless Your Black Heart (2004)	Now You Are One of Us (2006)

Professional ratings
Review scores
Source	Rating
Allmusic	4/5 stars
Pitchfork Media	(6.4/10)

God Bless Your Black Heart is a 2004 album by the American rock band The Paper Chase.

== Track listing ==
The album, according to the liner notes, is separated into "entries"

All tracks are written by John Congleton.

Entry Number One, I Still Hear Boots in the Hallway
No.	Title	Length
1.	"Said the Spider to the Fly"	4:34

Entry Number Two, At One Point I Had the Time... Now Time Has Me
No.	Title	Length
2.	"One Day He Went Out for Milk and Never Came Home"	5:25
3.	"What I'd Be Without Me"	4:47

Entry Number Three, I’ve Come to the Conclusion That I Am Not in Fact The Messiah After All
No.	Title	Length
4.	"The Sinking Ship, The Grand Applause"	4:14
5.	"Piggy's Had Too Much Wine"	0:42
6.	"Ready, Willing, Cain and Able"	4:50
7.	"Now, We Just Slowly Circle the Draining Fish Bowl"	5:32

Entry Number Four, Welcome Home Henry. So Table for One Is It?
No.	Title	Length
8.	"A War Is Coming"	0:53
9.	"Your Ankles to Your Earlobes"	4:57
10.	"Let's Be Bad, Henry, Let's Be Really Bad"	3:30
11.	"Now You're Gonna Get It"	4:59
12.	"Abby, You're Going To Burn for What You've Done to Me"	1:39
13.	"Your Pretty Little Head"	1:27

Entry Number Five, You Are Now Free
No.	Title	Length
14.	"Dying With Decent Music"	5:10
Total length:		52:45

- At the end of the lyrics of "Dying With Decent Music" in the liner notes, there's a blank "entry" that reads; "Final Entry, See You Soon"
