= Love Your Abuser Remixed =

Remix album by Lymbyc Systym
- Released: September 23, 2008
- Genre: Post-rock electronica
- Length: 38:17
- Label: Mush

Lymbyc Systym chronology
Love Your Abuser (2007)	Love Your Abuser Remixed (2008)	Field Studies (2009)

Professional ratings
Review scores
Source	Rating
The Austin Chronicle	3/5 stars
Scenepointblank	(6.7/10)

Love Your Abuser Remixed is a 2008 album of remixes of tracks that were originally on the Lymbyc Systym album, Love Your Abuser.

== Track listing ==
No.	Title	Length
1.	"Astrology Days (The One AM Radio remix)"	2:52
2.	"Birds (Lymbyc Systym remix)"	5:06
3.	"Fall Bicycle (The Album Leaf remix)"	4:39
4.	"Truth Skull (Bibio remix)"	5:14
5.	"Love Your Abuser (This Will Destroy You remix)"	5:36
6.	"Rest EasyAge Kindly (Back Ted N-Ted remix)"	3:14
7.	"A Day at the Beach (Reference remix)"	0:50
8.	"Idle Wires (Lymbyc Systym remix)"	3:47
9.	"Pittsburgh Left (Eliot Lipp remix)"	3:34
10.	"...So We Can Sleep (Daedelus remix)"	3:25
Total length:		38:17
