= Snowblood =

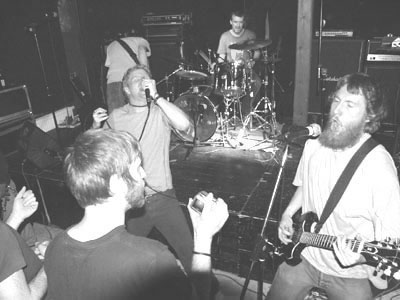
- Live in Niesky, Germany in 2004.

Background information
- Origin: Glasgow, Scotland, United Kingdom
- Genres: Post-metal, heavy metal, doom metal, sludge metal, death metal
- Years active: 2002–2009
- Labels: Superfi, Lawgiver
- Past members: Luke Devlin; David Tobin; Ewan Mackenzie; Graham Young; Tracey Fallon

Snowblood were a four-piece (sometimes five-piece) experimental sludge/post-metal/doom metal band from Glasgow, Scotland, formed in 2002. Their third and final self-titled album was released in 2009, through Superfi Records.

Snowblood composed lengthy guitar-based pieces, usually focused around the elaboration of a single theme. These pieces developed the dynamics between the serene and the brutal side of the post-metal and doom metal genres.

Their first two albums, The Human Tragedy (2004) and Being and Becoming (2005) were both recorded by Neil McNaught at the Split Level Studios in Edinburgh, Scotland. Their third album was recorded and produced by the band in a cottage near the Scottish village of Buckie.

== Discography ==
=== Albums ===
- The Human Tragedy [Superfi (LP) / Lawgiver (CD)] 2004
- Being and Becoming [Superfi (LP) / Lawgiver (CD)] 2005
- Self Titled [Superfi (CD)] 2009

=== Compilation albums ===
- "Aubade" appeared on It Came From the Hills (Magic Bullet Records)
