= Tunnel Blanket =

Studio album by This Will Destroy You
- Released: May 9, 2011
- Genre: Post-rock; doom metal; shoegazing; ambient; drone
- Length: 60:42
- Label: Monotreme, Suicide Squeeze, Hobbledehoy Record Co.
- Producer: John Congleton

This Will Destroy You chronology
Moving on the Edges of Things (2010)	Tunnel Blanket (2011)	Live in Reykjavik, Iceland (2013)

Singles from Tunnel Blanket
- 1. "Communal Blood" / "Reprise" Released: December 6, 2010; 2. "Black Dunes" Released: November 28, 2011

Professional ratings
Aggregate scores
Source	Rating
Metacritic	76/100
Review scores
Source	Rating
Alternative Press	(4/5)
The Big Takeover	(positive)
Rock Sound	(9/10)
The Stranger	(positive)
Rockfreaks.net	(8.5/10)

Tunnel Blanket is the third studio album by the American band This Will Destroy You. Recorded and mixed by John Congleton, it was released in Europe on May 9, 2011, on Monotreme Records, and on May 10 on Suicide Squeeze Records for the rest of the world with the exception of Australia and New Zealand where it was released by Hobbledehoy Record Co.

Tunnel Blanket consists of drone style music, with the band's members describing it as 'doomgaze', a cross between doom metal and shoegazing. The album is described as dark, with a theme of death.

This is the first album to feature bassist/keyboardist Donovan Jones and drummer Alex Bhore.

== Track listing ==
All tracks are written by This Will Destroy You.

No.	Title	Length
1.	"Little Smoke"	12:05
2.	"Glass Realms"	6:52
3.	"Communal Blood"	8:13
4.	"Reprise"	8:18
5.	"Killed the Lord, Left for the New World"	6:33
6.	"Osario"	2:40
7.	"Black Dunes"	8:16
8.	"Powdered Hand"	7:45
Total length:		60:42

== Personnel ==
This Will Destroy You

- Jeremy Galindo – guitar
- Donovan Jones – bass guitar, keyboard
- Chris King – guitar
- Alex Bhore – drums

Additional musicians

- Christopher Tignor – strings
- Michael Bryant – brass

Production

- John Congleton – mixing, engineering
- Alan Douches – mastering
