= Now You Are One of Us =

2006 album by The Paper Chase

Now You Are One Of Us

Studio album by The Paper Chase
- Released: June 6, 2006
- Length: 51:00
- Label: Kill Rock Stars

The Paper Chase chronology
God Bless Your Black Heart (2004)	Now You Are One Of Us (2006)	Someday This Could All Be Yours Vol. 1 (2009)

Professional ratings
Aggregate scores
Source	Rating
Metacritic	(81/100)
Review scores
Source	Rating
Allmusic	4/5 stars
Pitchfork Media	(7.7/10)

Now You Are One Of Us is the fourth studio album by the American rock band The Paper Chase.

== Track listing ==
No.	Title	Length
1.	"It's Out There And It's Gonna Get You"	0:51
2.	"We Know Where You Sleep"	4:22
3.	"The Kids Will Grow Up To Be Assholes"	5:00
4.	"Wait Until I Get My Hands On You"	5:52
5.	"You Will Never Take Me Alive"	4:15
6.	"Delivered In A Firm Unyielding Way Lingering For Just A Bit Too Long Communicate This Message "I Own You""	1:02
7.	"The Most Important Part Of Your Body"	5:41
8.	"What's So Amazing About Grace"	1:26
9.	"You're One Of Them Aren't You?"	3:06
10.	"The Song Will Eat Itself"	1:51
11.	"...And All The Candy You Can Eat"	4:05
12.	"All Manner Of Pox Or Canker"	1:36
13.	"At The Other End Of The Leash"	4:02
14.	"We Will Make You One Of Us"	2:38
15.	"The House Is Alive And The House Is Hungry"	5:06
Total length:		51:01
