= Wooden Blue Records =

Independent record label

Wooden Blue Records was a Phoenix, AZ independent record label in the late 1980s to early 1990s perhaps best known for releasing Jimmy Eat World's first LP in 1994. It specialized in punk rock, indie rock and emo. It was run by Joel Leibow and Jeremy Yocum.

== Roster ==
- Andherson
- Aquanaut Drinks Coffee
- Carrier
- Christie Front Drive
- Haskel
- Jimmy Eat World
- Pine Wyatt
- Safehouse
- Temper Tantrum

== See also ==
- List of record labels
