= Ancient VVisdom =

American metal band

Ancient VVisdom is an American rock band described as occult or gothic rock, folk metal and neofolk. They, among others, released two albums on Magic Bullet Records and two on Argonauta Records.

== Discography ==
- A Godlike Inferno (2011, Shinebox Recordings)
- Deathlike (2013, Prosthetic Records)
- Sacrificial (2014, Magic Bullet Records)
- 33 (2017, Magic Bullet Records)
- Mundus (2019, Argonauta Records)
- Master of the Stone (2024, Argonauta Records)
