= Symbolyst =

Studio album by Lymbyc Systym
- Released: September 18, 2012
- Genre: Post-Rock; Indie Rock
- Label: Western Vinyl

Lymbyc Systym chronology
Shutter Release (2009)	Symbolyst (2012)

Professional ratings
Review scores
Source	Rating

Symbolyst is the third LP by American post-rock band Lymbyc Systym, released on September 18, 2012. On July 31, 2012, the song "Prairie School" was uploaded to SoundCloud by the band's label.

== Track listing ==
No.	Title	Length
1.	"Prairie School"	4:24
2.	"Falconer"	2:59
3.	"Downtime"	4:33
4.	"Nightfall"	3:02
5.	"Falling Together"	4:18
6.	"Eyes Forward"	3:17
7.	"Condense"	4:20
8.	"Wave"	2:22
9.	"Dragon Year"	5:37
10.	"In Transit"	3:23
Total length:		38:12
