= Jimmy Eat World (1994 album) =

Studio album by Jimmy Eat World

Studio album by Jimmy Eat World
- Released: December 1994
- Studio: Phoenix Recording Company
- Genres: Pop-punk; skate punk
- Length: 37:05
- Label: Wooden Blue
- Producers: Jimmy Eat World; Steve Naugton

Jimmy Eat World chronology
One, Two, Three, Four (1994)	Jimmy Eat World (1994)	Static Prevails (1996)

Jimmy Eat World is the debut studio album by the American rock band Jimmy Eat World. It was released in December 1994 through Wooden Blue Records. In 1993, musician Jim Adkins joined a band with his childhood friend and drummer, Zach Lind. Once guitarist Tom Linton and bassist Mitch Porter joined the lineup, the band named themselves Jimmy Eat World. As their hometown of Mesa, Arizona lacked a music scene, they started their own with their friends. The band's recording was a demo tape, created in early 1994; this eventually led to the formation of Wooden Blue by Jeremy Yocum and Adkins' friend from school, Joel Leibow.

Wooden Blue would then release Jimmy Eat World's One, Two, Three, Four extended play prior to the creation of the album. The band recorded their self-titled full-length debut over three days, co-producing it with Steve Naugton, at Phoenix Recording Company. The album is a pop-punk and skate punk release, drawing comparison to Face to Face, J Church, NOFX, and Superchunk. Linton handled the majority of the lead vocals, while Adkins sang one song, "Usery". Critics agreed it was not representative of the rest of their catalogue; Linton and Yocum were also dismissive of the album.

== Background ==
Upon attending Mountain View High School in Mesa, Arizona, Jim Adkins began playing in bands with other musicians before starting his own. Originally named Sonic Pudding, they changed their name to I Ate the Sandbox and then to Schon Theory. This band was representative of its members' respective music collections, which were predominantly alternative rock and pop-punk-oriented; the latter was gaining popularity during this period. Adkins particularly enjoyed two specific San Diego-based artists at the time: Drive Like Jehu and Rocket from the Crypt. In 1993, the last year of high school for Adkins, childhood friend Zach Lind asked him if he wanted to join a band he was drumming for. Lind was already playing with guitarist Tom Linton, who had just graduated from Westwood High School. The pair were looking for a bassist after their mutual friend and fellow Westwood attendee Rick Burch had turned them down, preferring to play with his own group, Carrier. Adkins initially performed bass with the pair until he realized that he was better suited to the group on his guitar. Instead, he recruited Mitch Porter from No Reason Boner, a band they were both in previously.

The four of them started composing material, which they practiced in the garage of Lind's parents, going by the name Jimmy Eat World. The term originated from when Tom's brothers Jim and Ed were fighting, resulting in the latter going to his own room and drawing a picture of Jim eating the earth, which Ed titled "Jimmy eat world". According to Jeremy Yocum, a friend of the band and later the founder of their first record label, their earliest music was very fast. He likened their tempos to those of other punk bands such as Green Day, NOFX, and Propagandhi. Linton has stated that at the time the band's influences were "all over the place", ranging from noisy bands like Unwound and Sonic Youth to the pop-punk of Propagandhi and NOFX. Alongside his role as a rhythm guitarist, Linton handled the majority of the vocals, while Adkins sang infrequently. After gathering a set's worth of material, they played locally, making their live debut in February 1994 in the backroom of a used clothes store.

Mesa was a largely sports-oriented locale that did not have one place for punk youths to attend. As a result, it lacked a local scene, forcing Jimmy Eat World and their associates to start one. Subsequently, venues opened and were active between one and six months, ranging from a storage space to a rented warehouse. They recorded a demo tape at a local church in early 1994, which was used to promote the band around Phoenix, Arizona.

== Development and recording ==
Jimmy Eat World looked for show possibilities in close-by areas of Tempe and Phoenix, Arizona, struggling in the former as the members were underage and thus unable to play in bars. In an effort to attract touring artists locally, Adkins and school friend Joel Leibow listed their phone number and mailing address in Maximumrocknroll's guide Book Your Own Fuckin' Life as a promoters company, Bring Me the Head Of Productions. As they played various shows, Jimmy Eat World was building up connections, leading to Leibow receiving an invite for them to record some material. He was in contact with studio owner Steve Naugton, who operated at Groove Factory and witnessed the band live. He enjoyed their performance and said that if they wanted to release music, he would do it at no charge. Despite the opportunity, the band had yet to sign with a record label and had no way to widely release any material they recorded. Yocum, a friend of Leibow, told him that he had some funds placed in a savings account that he received after sustaining a burn injury in 1988. In addition, Leibow relied on his parents to lend him some money. By the end of the same day they had begun discussing how to release the band's music, Leibow and Yocum decided to establish their own record label, Wooden Blue Records.

Wooden Blue was named after a joke in the MTV program The State. The pair's goal was to issue music by local bands in the area without expecting a return on investment. Leibow reasoned that the pair "really just wanted to get music out there and find other people who liked what we were into". In particular, Leibow wanted to release something from Jimmy Eat World, while Yocum wished to do the same for another local band, Aquanaut Drinks Coffee. The label had a P.O. box listed with a Tempe address because it was more credible than being listed in Mesa. Yocum later admitted that they did not keep contracts nor balance books and lacked a firm business plan. Of all the acts on the label's roster, Jimmy Eat World became their most prolific band. Wooden Blue first released the seven-inch vinyl EP One, Two, Three, Four, 500 copies of which were pressed.

Jimmy Eat World's self-titled debut album was recorded in three days. The band members and Naugton served as producers. Naugton also handled recording, which was done at Phoenix Recording Company. Larry Elyea mastered the album at Mind's Eye Digital. Sarah Pont contributed violins to the recordings, while Lind also played accordion in addition to his typical role as the band's drummer. The album's sound has been described as pop-punk and skate punk, in the vein of Face to Face, J Church, and NOFX. Punk Planet's John Zero thought that it was highly similar to the work of Superchunk. Linton sung lead vocals on every song on the album, save for "Usery", which Adkins sang instead. Kyle Ryan of The A.V. Club mentioned that "Reason 346" had elements of what Jimmy Eat World explored further on their second album, Static Prevails (1996). The staff at Consequence of Sound said Jimmy Eat World shared the "gnarled, almost punkish aggression" of Static Prevails while lacking that album's "contemplation and atmosphere." They also mentioned that the nearly seven-minute "Scientific" started the band's tradition of including one song with an extended length on the majority of their albums. Opener "Chachi" has Linton talking about how he wished someone would throw him from a 40-story building.

== Release and reception ==
Jimmy Eat World's self-titled debut album was released through Wooden Blue Records in December 1994, limited to 2,000 copies. The artwork is an old picture of Ed and Jim Linton, with one of them holding the other in a headlock. Jim Schroeder did the CD layout, while Craig Robeson contributed a photograph of the band. "Reason 346" was later included on the Japanese version of their Singles (2000) compilation release.

Punk Planet reviewed Jimmy Eat World in 1995, where Zero felt that it grew on him with repeated listens, praising the "twisting melodies, catchy beats". In 2012, The A.V. Club's Jason Heller noted its out-of-print status, reasoning that while it was not a poor effort, it was not representative of the rest of the band's catalog. Ryan agreed with Heller, stating that the band who issued Jimmy Eat World and Damage (2013) are "the same in name only." Journalist Dan Ozzi, in his book Sellout: The Major-Label Feeding Frenzy That Swept Punk, Emo, and Hardcore 1994–2007 (2021), wrote that the fast recording time "only intensified the speed of the band's bouncy melodies. Each song sounded like a race among members to see who could finish their part first. Levels were shaky and tempos were uneven." Yocum told Ozzi that he was equally unfazed by the album, preferring to see them live rather than hear it. Linton was dismissive of the album but admitted that several years removed, "it was OK. It wasn't very varied, almost only fast songs".

Reflecting on the album in 2025, over thirty years after the album's release, Jim Adkins noted, "It’s a document of us in our senior year of high school, more or less. It’s not at all what we're capable of doing now. But you really can't be hard on your younger self for things you didn’t know or couldn't do. It's a time capsule."

== Track listing ==
Track listing per booklet.

No.	Title	Length
1.	"Chachi"	2:52
2.	"Patches"	3:33
3.	"Amphibious"	1:42
4.	"Splat Out of Luck"	2:20
5.	"House Arrest"	2:21
6.	"Usery"	3:13
7.	"Wednesday"	2:05
8.	"Crooked"	4:03
9.	"Reason 346"	4:19
10.	"Scientific"	6:57
11.	"Cars"	3:40
Total length:		37:05

== Personnel ==
Personnel per booklet.

Jimmy Eat World

- Tom Linton – guitar, vocals
- Jim Adkins – guitar, vocals
- Mitch Porter – bass guitar
- Zach Lind – drums, cymbals, accordion

Additional musicians

- Sarah Pont – violins

Production

- Steve Naugton – recording, producer
- Larry Elyea – mastering
- Jimmy Eat World – producer
- Craig Robeson – band photo
- Jim Schroeder – CD layout
