= Live in Reykjavik, Iceland =

Live album by This Will Destroy You
- Released: October 29, 2013
- Genre: Instrumental rock, post-rock, drone, ambient, shoegaze
- Length: 85:07
- Label: Magic Bullet

This Will Destroy You chronology
Tunnel Blanket (2011)	Live in Reykjavik, Iceland (2013)	Another Language (2014)

Live in Reykjavik, Iceland is the first live album by This Will Destroy You. It was released on October 29, 2013.

== Track listing ==
No.	Title	Length
1.	"A Three Legged Workhorse"	8:08
2.	"There Are Some Remedies Worse Than the Disease"	6:31
3.	"Black Dunes"	9:14
4.	"Burial on the Presidio Banks"	6:50
5.	"Glass Realms"	7:16
6.	"Communal Blood"	8:19
7.	"Quiet"	4:55
8.	"They Move on Tracks of Never-Ending Light"	5:27
9.	"Little Smoke"	11:18
10.	"The Mighty Rio Grande"	11:30
11.	"Threads"	5:39
Total length:		85:07

== Personnel ==
This Will Destroy You

- Jeremy Galindo – guitar
- Donovan Jones – bass guitar, keyboard
- Chris King – guitar
- Alex Bhore – drums, mixing

Other personnel

- Finnur Hákonarson – engineer
- Charlie Vela – mixing
- Alan Douches – mastering
