= Line Rider =

Internet game involving a fictional sled rider interacting with simulated physics

- Developer: Boštjan Čadež
- Publishers: inXile Entertainment (remake); Genius Products (DS); Deep Silver (remake, Europe)
- Designer: Boštjan Čadež
- Platforms: Microsoft Silverlight, Adobe Flash, Nintendo DS, Wii, Microsoft Windows, Android, iOS
- Release: Silverlight, Flash; September 23, 2006; DS: NA: September 16, 2008; EU: July 17, 2009; Windows: NA: September 23, 2008; EU: May 22, 2009; Wii: NA: October 7, 2008; EU: July 31, 2009
- Modes: Single-player, multiplayer

Line Rider is a browser game or software toy, with versions available for Microsoft Silverlight, JavaScript, Windows, and Flash. It was originally created in September 2006 by Boštjan Čadež (also known as "fšk"), a Slovenian student. Soon after its initial appearance on DeviantArt, Line Rider became an internet phenomenon.

Line Rider received coverage from several outlets, such as Yahoo! and Time Magazine, and appeared in several McDonald's commercials for the Snack Wrap in 2008. Line Rider was also selected by staff and voted by Jay is Games users to be the Best Webtoy of 2006. A two-page article about the game was published in Games for Windows: The Official Magazine.

== Gameplay ==
The Line Rider character "Bosh"

The basic concept is to draw one or more lines with the mouse on which a boy (referred to as "Bosh" by the creator) on a sled can ride after the player presses the "Play" button. The game includes simulated physics, which means the track must be sufficiently smooth to prevent the character from falling off the sled. The author has said that he prefers the description "toy" to "game", as there is no goal to accomplish, nor does it have an end. In spite of its simplicity, many complicated tracks have been created, which include loops and other stunts. New tracks can consist of unrealistic tricks such as "flings" and "manuals" both on and off the sled. Many tracks created by the community have been set to music, such as the video This Will Destroy You, timed completely to the entire self-titled This Will Destroy You album. Others use background art to fill their tracks with hand-drawn mountain slopes and trees. Tracks are typically shared among users by uploading a video to websites, such as YouTube or Google Video. Revision 6.2 of Line Rider was released in August 2007, and was optimized to run more smoothly, and to have a higher-powered zoom tool. The game does allow created tracks to be saved, and shown to the public (only if creator wishes to do so). The storage is not on the Line Rider website, but on the user's hard drive, therefore allowing maximum storage implication and quicker access to stored tracks. In order to allow public viewing, the user must be logged into the website server.

On July 1, 2008, the original Flash version was replaced by a new one written in Silverlight. It included a new feature that allowed people to send tracks to other people via Windows Messenger. On October 23, 2009, this was replaced by Beta 3, which has the option to use dual players, a camera, trapdoor and deceleration lines. In 2015, a "Spiritual Successor" to Line Rider was released for Windows, Line Rider Advanced, which featured an in-game recording feature, selection tools, and advanced settings. Also in 2015, a new web version was released, Line Rider Javascript. In 2020, the program Line Rider Advanced: Community Edition, also known as LR:ACE, was released. The project's goal was to unify the best features from several existing forks into one version. It has not been updated since 2020. In 2023, an updated version of Line Rider Advanced was released called LROverhaul, a restoration project of LRA:CE. It had updated graphics, lots of bug fixes and new features to make Line Rider more user-friendly.

== History ==
=== Conception and development ===
Boštjan Čadež, a student at the Academy of Fine Arts and Design in Slovenia, was assigned to do an art project by the school's illustration class in 2005. He planned the project to be coded animation software from the beginning, as he had previous programming experience developing VJ sets, "little" Flash games, and presets for Advanced Visualization Studio. With that plus pages of his sketch book drawings to look at, his first idea was a mixture of pre-coding and traditional frame-by-frame methods of animation, where the user animated "by just drawing" and altered "on the fly."

Čadež noticed a program by Anderas Gysin named Cronodraw that partially matched this concept, and later placed the drawing and mouse control mechanics of Gysin's program into the final product of Line Rider. Čadež then found a page in his sketchbook that consisted only of a small man sledding on a tilted line; this brought back memories of when he was a child doodling the man sledding on various "path lines", and he decided this would be the basis of the project.

Line Rider was completed in non-consecutive periods for more than a year, the amount of work totaling to four months; the development process involved Čadež learning physics and vector mathematics through tutorials by N+ developer Metanet Software. He explained that he wanted the experience of playing the game to be "like life," which was why he left out an eraser feature in his original version: "If you make a mistake, it's there. You can't just erase it." inXile founder Brian Fargo conceived the name Bosh for the main character, although Čadež initially proposed Sanka.

=== Release and initial popularity ===
Čadež first uploaded Line Rider to his DeviantArt account fšk on September 23, 2006, and it garnered 10,000 viewers within 24 hours. However, the game's popularity escalated after a Digg user named Unconed posted about the game in the fall of 2006; this led to several users posting screen-captured footage of the drawings to YouTube, which all totaled 15 million views by December 2006. By October 2006, Line Rider was viewed more than four million times on Deviantart, downloaded more than 325,000 times, and reached number seven on Google Zeitgeist's search query chart (above searches about or related to Kim Jong Il and Mortal Kombat: Armageddon); the success of the game was acknowledged by Deviantart founder Angelo Sotira: "It's been amazing. Line Rider has become an event. It's viral growth at its best." Several knock-off versions of the game, such as LineFlyer, Jeep Flyer, Line Boarder, and Chair Flyer were also created and published online within weeks of its original release.

The New York Times praised the rejection of the eraser tool for adding challenge to Line Rider: "The difficulty of creating a great course using today's crude tools makes you even more amazed at the genius of the best Line Rider artists' work." Wietse de Vries, a founder of a fan site for the game named LineRider.org, analyzed that the game's popularity was attributed to its ability for players to express their creativity, contrasted with many other games that "always looked the same and had too less features."

=== Later years ===
On December 19, 2006, Čadež published an updated version of Line Rider (www.official-linerider.com) that added erasing and zooming features as well as more line variations. He originally planned to release it a month before until he was contacted by inXile Entertainment founder Brian Fargo to purchase the rights for the game via Skype. Fargo appreciated Line Rider as "another Tetris" in an era of high-budget, complex video games, and that the game made the player an artist.

== As an educational tool ==
Line Rider has been the basis for an article published in The Physics Teacher magazine concerning the use of computers in Physics education by members of the Physics Department of Southeastern Louisiana University. The article uses video captures of Line Rider to explore the physics in the game by use of video analysis. The game has also been analyzed for its intersections with music and gameplay experiences. In a 2024 article titled "Line Rider and Ludomusical Excesses," published in the Journal of Sound and Music in Games, musicologist Edwin K. C. Li uses Line Rider as a case study to explore music's multifarious relations with games, inviting alternative configurations beyond music's centrality in gameplay.

== Remake ==
Line Rider 2: Unbound cover art

Line Rider 2: Unbound (Line Rider: Freestyle in Europe) is a remake released in September 2008 for the Nintendo DS, Microsoft Windows, and Wii. The gameplay is similar to that of the original revision 6.2, with the addition of a multiplayer puzzle mode, and has several added features including different vehicles, exploding lines, and scenery.

On December 19, 2006, it was announced that InXile Entertainment had gained console rights for Line Rider, legally restricting copies and imitations of the game. Microsoft Windows, Nintendo DS and Wii versions were released in Fall 2008, containing new features.

It was stated that a story mode featuring new characters Bailey and Chaz would be in the game. In the story mode the player competes against Chaz in hopes of winning the ultimate sled and the love of Bailey. This mode spans 40 courses, all of which were designed by TechDawg, a well known track designer. The player can also download other people's tracks off of the internet from the game's website. The European version was published by Deep Silver.

Voice actors include Tom Kenny (as Bosh), Tara Strong (as Bailey) and Fred Tatasciore (as Chaz) in the cutscenes and credits.

A version has been released for the Apple iPhone called Line Rider iRide. This version includes iPhone specific features such as accelerometer based physics and worldwide file sharing.

=== Reception ===
Reception

Aggregate score
Aggregator	Score		
Aggregator	DS	PC	Wii
Metacritic	59/100	73/100	62/100

Review scores
Publication	Score		
Publication	DS	PC	Wii
1Up.com	C	C+	C+
Edge	5/10	N/A	N/A
Game Informer	N/A	N/A	6.25/10
GamePro	3.5/5	N/A	N/A
GameSpot	7/10	7/10	7/10
GameZone	6.4/10	N/A	7.9/10
IGN	7.7/10	8/10	7.8/10
Nintendo Power	6/10	N/A	5/10
Nintendo World Report	3/10	N/A	N/A
VideoGamer.com	7/10	N/A	N/A

The game received "mixed or average reviews" on all platforms. according to video game review aggregator Metacritic.

The game was nominated for two Nintendo DS–specific awards in IGN's 2008 Game of the Year awards; namely, Best Puzzle Game and Best Original Score.
