= Young Bodies Heal Quickly, You Know =

2000 album by The Paper Chase

Studio album by The Paper Chase
- Released: August 2, 2000
- Length: 52:07
- Label: Kill Rock Stars

The Paper Chase chronology
Young Bodies Heal Quickly, You Know (2000)	Hide the Kitchen Knives (2002)

Professional ratings
Review scores
Source	Rating
AllMusic	4/5 stars
Sputnikmusic	4.5/5 stars

Young Bodies Heal Quickly, You Know is an album by the American rock band The Paper Chase.

== Track listing ==
Young Bodies Heal Quickly, You Know track listing
No.	Title	Length
1.	"This May Be the Last Song You Ever Hear"	1:00
2.	"These Things Happen"	3:44
3.	"Ever Since the Turn"	3:26
4.	"Apple Pies and Alibis"	2:10
5.	"Neat; Manageable; Piles"	5:37
6.	"Can I Pour You Another Drink, Lover?"	2:41
7.	"Lenny What's Gotten Into You?"	2:09
8.	"Goddamn These Hands (I Let Them Touch You)"	1:48
9.	"A Face Like That Could Launch a Thousand Ships"	3:27
10.	"Throw Your Body on the Apparatus"	1:51
11.	"Off With Their Heads!"	6:59
12.	"Daddy's Got Your Nose"	2:48
13.	"Paperwork"	4:08
14.	"When You Least Expect It"	1:28
15.	"When (And If) The Big One Hits... I'll Just Meet You There"	8:51
