= Romance of Young Tigers =

American instrumental band

- Origin: Dayton, Ohio, United States
- Genres: Experimental, ambient, noise
- Years active: 2005–2009
- Label: Magic Bullet Records
- Past members: Todd Osborn, Gabe Mitchell, Seth Graham, Aaron Smith
- Website: Official Site; Magic Bullet Records

Romance of Young Tigers was an American instrumental band from Dayton, Ohio that released two albums through Magic Bullet Records and is noted for DIY handmade or recycled packaging for albums for limited or unique runs.

== History ==
Founded in early 2005 in Dayton, Ohio by Seth Graham, Todd Osborn and Jeremiah Stikeleather. As a two guitar and bass trio Romance of Young Tigers was not able to find a drummer initially and optioned to forgo percussion in favor of loops to keep time. Stikeleather left to join Twelve Tribes after the release of the I Have Supped Full on Horrors EP and Gabe Mitchell and Aaron Smith joined for the recording of the Marie EP. The band disbanded in June 2009.

== Members ==
- Todd Osborn
- Gabe Mitchell
- Seth Graham
- Aaron Smith

== Former members ==
- Jeremiah Stikeleather

== Discography ==
Studio albums

- November, 2006 - I Have Supped Full On Horrors (CD) - (Self Released)

Limited to 100.

- November, 2006 - I Have Supped Full On Horrors (CD) - un52006/48 (Unlabel)

Number 48 of series52

- 2007 - I Have Supped Full On Horrors (CD) - (Arclight Communications)

Limited to 400.

- September, 2008 - I Have Supped Full on Horrors (CD/LP) - MBL107 (Magic Bullet Records)

EPs

- September, 2008 - Marie (CD/LP) (Magic Bullet Records & self-Released, handmade)

Marie was recorded live on October 26, 2007 and includes no overdubs.

== See also ==
- List of rock instrumentals
- Post-Rock
- Ambient music
