= Shutter Release =

Studio album by Lymbyc Systym
- Released: November 3, 2009
- Genre: Post-rock, electronica
- Length: 41:41
- Label: Mush

Lymbyc Systym chronology
Love Your Abuser (2007)	Shutter Release (2009)	Symbolyst (2012)

Professional ratings
Review scores
Source	Rating
Strangeglue	(8/10)

Shutter Release is the second studio album by the electronic band Lymbyc Systym. It was released in 2009 on Mush Records.

== Track listing ==
No.	Title	Length
1.	"Trichromatic"	5:25
2.	"Ghost Clock"	3:42
3.	"Interiors"	4:35
4.	"Bedroom Anthem"	2:34
5.	"Kubrick"	4:16
6.	"Contemporary Art"	3:40
7.	"T-Ball"	2:57
8.	"Shutter Release"	3:41
9.	"Teddy"	4:35
10.	"Late Night Classic"	6:16
Total length:		41:41
