= Western Vinyl =

American independent record label

- Founded: 1998
- Distributor: Secretly Distribution
- Country of origin: U.S.
- Location: Austin, Texas
- Official website: westernvinyl.com

Western Vinyl is an independent record label founded in 1998 and based in Austin, Texas. The imprint was formed by Brian Sampson and Ryan Murphy originally to release their lo-fi indie rock projects as Win Foster and Havergal.

== Artists ==
- Abram Shook
- Air Waves
- Aisha Burns
- Alexander Turnquist
- Anomoanon
- Appendix Out
- Ava Luna
- Balmorhea
- Bexar Bexar
- Bonnie Prince Billy
- Botany
- Callers
- Caroline Says
- Carter Tanton
- Chas. Mtn.
- Christopher Tignor
- Dawn Landes
- Diane Coffee
- Dirty Projectors
- Early Day Miners
- Elephant Micah
- Et Ret
- Gary Wilson
- Glass Ghost
- Goldmund
- Grooms
- Heather Woods Broderick
- Here We Go Magic
- In Tall Buildings
- JBM
- J. Tillman
- Joseph Shabason
- Julie Sokolow
- Kaitlyn Aurelia Smith
- Köhn
- Lightning Dust
- Luke Temple
- Logan Farmer
- Lushlife
- Luxury Liners
- Lymbyc Systym
- Madagascar
- Mint Julep
- Moon Bros.
- Nat Baldwin
- Nightlands
- Ola Podrida
- Oren Ambarchi
- Papa M
- Peter Broderick
- Peter Oren
- Pierre Bastien
- Rindert Lammers
- Rob Burger
- Robert Lippok
- Rolf Julius
- The Rosebuds
- Salim Nourallah
- Secret Cities
- Shuta Hasunuma
- Sleep Whale
- Slow Six
- Soema Montenegro
- Stone Jack Jones
- Tetuzi Akiyama
- Tren Brothers
- Úlfur
- Voices & Organs
- Wilder Maker
- Wires Under Tension
- Young Moon

== See also ==
- List of companies based in Austin, Texas
- List of record labels
