= Christie Front Drive =

American emo band

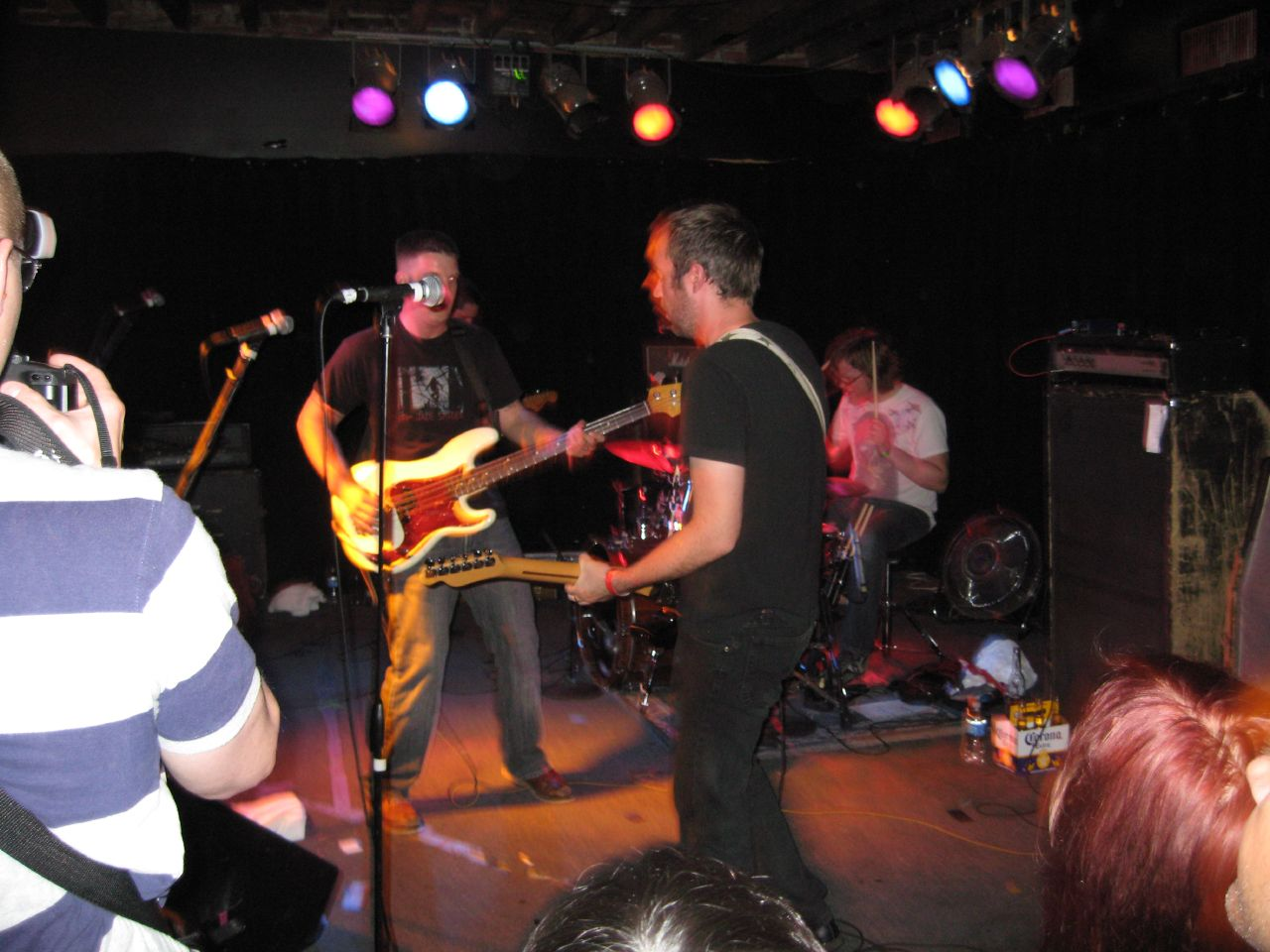
- Christie Front Drive playing at a reunion show in 2007

Background information
- Origin: Denver, Colorado, U.S.
- Genres: Emo
- Years active: 1993–1997, 2007, 2014
- Labels: Freewill, Magic Bullet, Caulfield, Crank!, Wooden Blue, Dark Operative
- Past members: Eric Richter (guitar, vocals); Jason Begin (guitar, screams); Kerry McDonald (bass, vocals); Ron Marschall (drums)

Christie Front Drive was an emo band from Denver, Colorado, active between 1993 and 1997. The lineup consisted of Eric Richter (vocals and guitar), Jason Begin (guitar), Kerry McDonald (bass) and Ron Marschall (drums). Bands such as Superchunk, Jawbreaker, Jawbox, Buffalo Tom, and Drive Like Jehu were cited as influences.

== History ==
The band released a self-titled EP and a 7-inch on Freewill Records in 1994. The two Freewill Records albums and several 7-inch were later combined and released as a self-titled full-length album (commonly referred to as Anthology). In 1995, Christie Front Drive released split records with Jimmy Eat World, Sineater, and Boys Life. They also contributed to several compilation albums including (Don't Forget To) Breathe from Crank! Records. The band broke up in 1997 and their only official full length, a self-titled album (commonly referred to as Stereo) was released posthumously by Caulfield Records.

Despite their short tenure, Christie Front Drive became a major influence on emo music in the 1990s. Eric Richter resurfaced in the bands Antarctica, The 101, and Golden City, and both Marschall and Begin went on to form The Blue Ontario. Marschall was also credited as an engineer on The Apples in Stereo's album, The Discovery of a World Inside the Moone and plays in Phoenix-based Tierra del Fuego. Jason Begin is currently performing under the name This Body as well as the Portland-based band Pireate Radio Deluxe and the random appearance with Modernstate. Bassist Kerry McDonald would go on to form The Mighty Rime, who released a self-titled record on Caulfield Records in 2002.

Christie Front Drive reunited on September 1, 2007, at the Marquis Theater in Denver as part of DenverFest III. All four original members participated. Magic Bullet Records, home of Eric Richter's current band Golden City, announced plans to re-release the entire Christie Front Drive discography. The label began with releasing a remastered version of their final self-titled album (also known as Stereo) on June 15, 2010, along with a DVD of the band's final show in 1996. In April 2019, Dark Operative records, formerly Magic Bullet Records, re-released the band's self-titled 7-inch and self-titled 12-inch on vinyl.

In March 2014, it was announced that Christie Front Drive would reunite for a show on May 17, 2014, as part of Pouzza Fest.

== Musical style and impact ==
Jason Ankeny of AllMusic referred to Christie Front Drive as "a vital 1990s link between hardcore and modern emo." The band's music was slow-paced. According to Ryan De Freitas in Kerrang!, "Christie Front Drive had the drawn-out, melancholic guitar passage down to a fine art." The band's style bears more similarities to post-rock and slowcore than to punk rock and hardcore punk. The band's influence has been observed in the music of Jimmy Eat World, as well as many others.

== Discography ==
=== Studio albums ===
| Year | Title | Label | Format | Other information |
|---|---|---|---|---|
| 1997 | Christie Front Drive (commonly referred to as Stereo) | Caulfield | CD / 12-inch vinyl | Reissued with DVD on June 15, 2010, on Magic Bullet. |

=== EPs ===
| Year | Title | Label | Format | Other information |
|---|---|---|---|---|
| 1994 | Christie Front Drive (self-titled 12-inch) | Freewil | CD / 12-inch vinyl | All tracks reissued in 1995 on Anthology. Reissued as remastered edition on May 21, 2013, on Magic Bullet. |
| 1995 | Christie Front Drive / Boy's Life split EP | Crank! | CD / 10-inch vinyl | |

=== Singles ===
| Year | Title | Label | Format | Other information |
|---|---|---|---|---|
| 1994 | Christie Front Drive (self-titled 7-inch) | Freewill | 7-inch vinyl | Out of print. Both tracks reissued in 1995 on Anthology. |
| 1995 | Christie Front Drive / Sineater split 7-inch | Hellkite | 7-inch vinyl | Out of print. Track reissued in 1995 on Anthology. |
| 1995 | Christie Front Drive / Jimmy Eat World split 7-inch | Wooden Blue | 7-inch vinyl | Out of print. Track reissued in 1995 on Anthology. |

=== Compilation albums ===
| Year | Title | Label | Format | Other information |
|---|---|---|---|---|
| 1995 | Christie Front Drive (commonly referred to as Anthology) | Caulfield | CD | Includes all songs from the self-titled 12-inch, the self-titled 7-inch and the split 7-inches with Sineater and Jimmy Eat World. |

=== Non-album tracks ===
| Year | Album / Source | Label | Song(s) | Other information |
|---|---|---|---|---|
| 1995 | Shmowballs | Sh-mow | "Bag" | Compilation released on CD. Out of print. |
| 1995 | Punk TV | Red Dawg | "Mary Tyler Moore Theme" | Compilation released on 12-inch vinyl. Out of print. |
| 1996 | Stealing the Pocket | Positively Punk | "Field" | Compilation released on 12-inch vinyl. Out of print. |
| 1996 | For Want Of... | X-Mist | "After the Parade" | Compilation released on double 7-inch vinyl. Out of print. |
| 1997 | Bread: The Edible Napkin | No Idea | "Bag" | Compilation released on CD and double 12-inch vinyl. Out of Print. |
| 1997 | (Don't Forget To) Breathe | Crank! | "Field" | Compilation released on CD and double 10-inch vinyl. Out of Print. |
