= Alexander Turnquist =

American guitarist and composer (born 1988)

Alexander Turnquist (born 1988 in Idaho) is an American guitarist and composer. He has released original albums on the VHF record label as well as limited released titles on the Kning Disk imprint and Textura record label. Turnquist has been compared to guitarists Jack Rose, Alex De Grassi, Kaki King, and James Blackshaw, as well as contemporary composer Philip Glass.

Turnquist's first widely released album, Faint at the Loudest Hour (VHF Records 2007), was given high marks, with an 8.2 from the popular music review website Pitchfork.

== Discography ==
| Album | Release date | Label |
|---|---|---|
| Odd Weather | 2005 | self-released |
| The Antique Shop | 2006 | self-released |
| Faint at the Loudest Hour | 2007 | VHF Records |
| Sleep Chapter | 2007 | New American Folk Hero |
| Apneic | 2007 | Kning Disk |
| As the Twilight Crane Dreams in Color | 2009 | VHF Records |
| Hallway of Mirrors | 2011 | VHF Records |
| Flying Fantasy | 2014 | Western Vinyl |
