= Wires Under Tension =

American post-rock band

- Origin: Bronx, New York City, United States
- Genres: Post-rock
- Years active: 2009–present
- Labels: Western Vinyl
- Members: Theo Metz; Christopher Tignor

Wires Under Tension are an American post-rock band from New York City.

== History ==
Wires Under Tension was founded by Christopher Tignor, a classically trained violinist, and drummer Theo Metz. Tignor is also a member of the band Slow Six and has done software design for Google. The initial impetus for founding the band grew out of Tignor's eviction from a Brooklyn apartment space where much of Slow Six's practice and composition had been carried out; the apartment building he had been living in was condemned after a fire marshal inspection. Tignor then moved to The Bronx and began working with Metz as a duo, culminating in the release of the full-length Light Science in early 2011.

== Discography ==
- Light Science (Western Vinyl, 2011)
- Replicant (Western Vinyl, 2012)
