= Eric Richter =

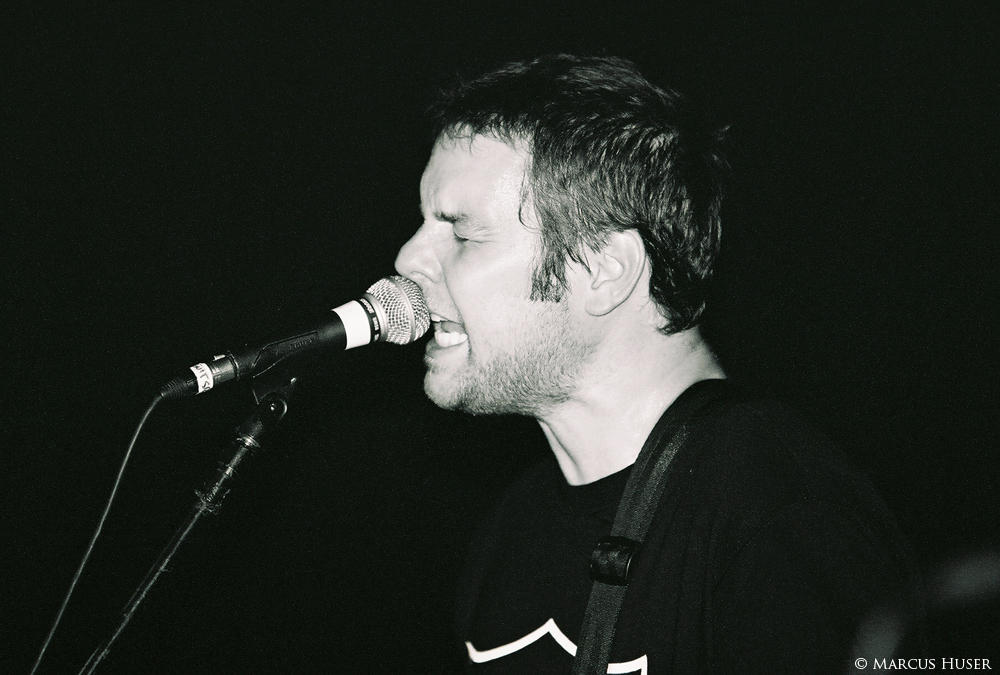

Background information
- Born: 5 February 1974 (age 51); Denver, Colorado, U.S.
- Genres: Indie rock, emo, post-rock, electronic, alternative rock
- Occupation(s): Musician, singer-songwriter
- Instrument(s): Vocals, guitar, bass, keyboards
- Years active: 1993–present

Eric Richter (born February 5, 1974) is an American musician and singer-songwriter from Denver, Colorado. He's best known for fronting the influential '90s emo band Christie Front Drive. He moved to New York City in 1996 and helped create the post-rock/electronica quintet Antarctica.

After Antarctica's demise in 1999, he started the power trio The 101. After releasing two LPs and one EP, they disbanded in 2006. His next project, Golden City released a 7" single on Sound Fiction (Norway) on March 9, 2009 and a 10"/CD EP on Magic Bullet Records on April 7, 2009. His current band, Highness released their debut LP Hold on May 14, 2013.

He also provided backing vocals on Jimmy Eat World's second full length, Static Prevails.
