= The Paper Chase (band) =

American alternative rock band

- Origin: Dallas, Texas, United States
- Genres: Post-hardcore; noise rock; chamber pop; lieder punk; dark cabaret; avant-rock; emo
- Years active: 1998–2010
- Labels: Kill Rock Stars; Southern Records; Idol Records
- Past members: John Congleton; Sean Kirkpatrick; Bobby Weaver; Jason Garner; Aryn Dalton
- Website: thepaperchaseband.com

The Paper Chase (stylized as "the pAper chAse") was an American alternative rock band formed in 1998 by producer/engineer John Congleton in Dallas, Texas, who were signed to Kill Rock Stars and Southern Records. Their albums God Bless Your Black Heart and Now You Are One of Us have been released on vinyl by the Austrian label Trost Records. The Paper Chase produced a combination of discordant melody and jagged noise pop, described by Allmusic as "a jagged structure of avant-garde jazz, noise, indie, and punk".

== History ==
Congleton wrote and produced all of the material, with a few exceptions: Bobby Weaver co-wrote "A Face That Could Launch a Thousand Ships" and "Off with Their Heads" from the album Young Bodies Heal Quickly, You Know. Mike Sanger co-wrote "Throw Your Body on the Apparatus", and Elliot Figg co-wrote "When You Least Expect It," both from the aforementioned album.

Their next project would have been a two-part album centered on natural disasters. The first half, entitled Someday This Could All Be Yours Vol. 1 was released on May 26, 2009, through Kill Rock Stars Records, though the second part has remained unreleased since the band's dissolution.

== Members ==
=== Former members ===
- John Congleton – vocals, guitar, programming
- Sean Kirkpatrick – synthesizer, piano
- Bobby Weaver – bass guitar
- Jason Garner – drums

=== Session musicians ===
- Kris Youmans – cello
- Becki Phares – violin
- Elliot Figg – piano
- Danna Berger – viola
- Tony Scholl – horns

=== Previous members ===
- Aryn Dalton – drums
- Matt Armstrong – piano

== Discography ==
=== Albums ===
- Young Bodies Heal Quickly, You Know (2000)
- Hide the Kitchen Knives (2002)
- God Bless Your Black Heart (2004)
- Now You Are One of Us (2006)
- Someday This Could All Be Yours Vol. 1 (2009)

=== Singles and EPs ===
- Essays on Frantic Desperation (split with E-Class and Lugsole) (1999)
- ...And the Machines Are Winning (1999)
- Cntrl-Alt-Delete-U (2001)
- What Big Teeth You Have (2004)
- Split with Red Worms Farm (2004)
- Split with Will Johnson (2004)
- Split with Xiu Xiu (2005)
