= Lymbyc Systym =

American instrumental band

Background information
- Origin: Tempe, Arizona, United States
- Genres: Instrumental rock, electronic, ambient, post-rock, synthwave
- Years active: 2001–present
- Labels: Western Vinyl, Magic Bullet, Mush, Hobbledehoy, & (Japan)
- Members: Jared Bell
- Past members: Mike Bell (deceased)

Lymbyc Systym is an American instrumental band from Tempe, Arizona, which formed in 2001, consisting of the brothers Jared and Michael Bell. The band's sound combines elements of instrumental rock and electronic music. Lymbyc Systym has toured with Broken Social Scene, the Books, Crystal Castles, the Album Leaf, Her Space Holiday, Buckethead, This Will Destroy You, Foxing and the One AM Radio. The duo have released records with Mush Records, Magic Bullet Records, Hobbledehoy Record Co, Western Vinyl and & Records (Japan). Michael Bell died on November 10, 2016, under undisclosed circumstances, leaving the future of Lymbyc Systym uncertain.

== Background ==
Jared Bell says the intentional misspelling of the Limbic System was to own it, lamenting comparisons to Lynyrd Skynyrd. For much of the recording of the 2012 album, Symbolyst, the brothers were not in the same state. "Our first full length when we lived in the same house in south Scottsdale, we were treating it like a job and we literally worked on it every day until it was done," Michael Bell explained. "After that, it morphed into a process of exchanging ideas online... Even when we lived in New York, we never met up until the end. We worked on stuff separately and exchanged ideas [online]."

== Discography ==
Albums

- Love Your Abuser (2007)
- Shutter Release (2009)
- Symbolyst (2012)
- Split Stones (2015)

EPs

- Live Kin (2003)
- Carved by Glaciers (2005)
- Field Studies (2009) - split EP with This Will Destroy You
- New Varieties (2016)

Compilations and remixes

- "Bubonic Tonic" (Lotus remix) on Copy/Paste/Repeat (2007)
- "Truth Skull" (live radio performance) on WUAG Presents: Wooden Anniversary (2008)
- Love Your Abuser Remixed (2008)
- "What Time Is It Now" (The Consulate General remix) on What Time Is It Now EP (2010)
- "The Architekt" (Arms and Sleepers remix) on Matador Remixed (2010)
- Remixes & Miscellaneous (2013)
- XPLAYMIX 21 | 2015 (2015)
- "Paraboloid" (Evenings remix) (2016)
