= Love Your Abuser =

Studio album by Lymbyc Systym
- Released: January 30, 2007
- Genre: Post-rock electronica
- Length: 39:40
- Label: Mush

Lymbyc Systym chronology
Carved By Glaciers (2005)	Love Your Abuser (2007)	Love Your Abuser Remixed (2008)

Professional ratings
Review scores
Source	Rating
Drowned in Sound	(7/10)
Pop Matters	(7/10)
Rock Sound	(8/10)
XLR8R	(7/10)

Love Your Abuser is the debut studio album by American band Lymbyc Systym, released in 2007 on Mush Records.

== Track listing ==
No.	Title	Length
1.	"9 - Rest Easy/Age Kindly"	2:23
2.	"10 - Love Your Abuser"	5:19
3.	"1 - Astrology Days"	4:40
4.	"2 - Idle Wires"	3:44
5.	"3 - Fall Bicycle"	3:29
6.	"4 - Birds"	5:07
7.	"5 - A Day At the Beach"	0:50
8.	"6 - Truth Skull"	4:12
9.	"7 - Pittsburgh Left"	4:05
10.	"8 - ...So We Can Sleep"	5:51
Total length:		39:40
