= Magic Bullet Records =

- Founded: 1996
- Founder: Brent Eyestone
- Defunct: 2017
- Genre: Punk rock, heavy metal, experimental
- Country of origin: United States
- Location: Fredericksburg, Virginia
- Official website: www.magicbulletrecords.com

Magic Bullet Records was an American independent record label specialising in punk rock, heavy metal and experimental music.

== History ==
Magic Bullet records was founded in 1996 by Brent Eyestone, in order to release an album by Boysetsfire, entitled This Crying, This Screaming, My Voice Is Being Born. The label subsequently released over 140 recordings, including albums by Charles Manson, The All-American Rejects and This Will Destroy You. The label shut down at the end of 2017.

== Artists signed with Magic Bullet ==
- A City Safe From Sea
- Aughra
- Austin Lucas
- Big China & Little Trouble
- Cave In
- Charles Manson
- Christie Front Drive
- Disappearer
- Doomriders
- Forensics
- Ghastly City Sleep
- Golden City
- Integrity
- INTRCPTR
- Kaospilot
- Lymbyc Systym
- Made Out of Babies
- Majority Rule
- Meditative Sect
- Old Man Gloom
- Rattler
- Stephen Brodsky
- Suppression
- The All-American Rejects
- The Wayward
- This Will Destroy You
- Wailin Storms
- Valerian Swing
- Years

Former or inactive bands

- Ancient VVisdom
- Jesuit
- Loser Life
- Corn on Macabre
- Crimson Spectre
- Romance of Young Tigers

== Compilation album ==
The label has released one compilation album, titled It Came from the Hills, Vol. 1. It was released February 28, 2006.

=== Track list ===
1. Jinxed At Twelve: "The Bomba"
2. Nitro Tokyo: "Fuel My Fire"
3. Taint: "Poison Pen Attack"
4. This Will Destroy You: "The World Is Our ___"
5. Paul Michel: "Shoot First"
6. Aughra: "Fostep"
7. Stephen Brodsky: "Wintermean Crimes"
8. Forensics: "Daytime Minutes"
9. Tephra: "Through Our Veins"
10. Light Yourself on Fire: "Rickshaw"
11. Snowblood: "Aubade"
12. Earthen Sea: "Sailing Toward Distant Lands"
