= John Congleton =

American record producer and musician

- Born: John Anthony Congleton
- Occupations: Record producer; engineer; mixer; writer; programmer
- Instruments: Vocals; guitar
- Years active: 1998–present

John Anthony Congleton is an American record producer, engineer, mixer, writer and musician.

In addition to his production work, Congleton has fronted the alternative rock band the Paper Chase, and writes music for the Nighty Nite. He has also written music for various other projects, including MTV's Jackass, the Discovery Channel, Friday Night Lights, Evil Lives Here, and several Halloween sound effects/music CDs.

In January 2016, it was announced that Congleton and the Nighty Nite would be releasing a full-length studio album on April 1 of that year. The album was called "Until The Horror Goes", and was released under John Congleton and The Nighty Nite instead of being under The Nighty Nite, an already existing band including Congleton.

== Band member ==
Musically, Congleton is best known for being a founding member of the band the Paper Chase, an alternative rock band formed in Dallas, Texas in 1998. The band was signed to Kill Rock Stars and Southern Records. Their albums God Bless Your Black Heart and Now You Are One of Us have been released on vinyl by the Austrian label Trost Records. Congleton produced all the band's material to date. He also wrote nearly all of the material, with a few exceptions. Since the dissolution of the Paper Chase he has formed the Nighty Nite with former Paper Chase bandmate, Jason Garner.

== Selected production work ==
Congleton has worked with the following musicians and groups.

- 90 Day Men
- AJJ
- The Accidentals
- Alvvays
- Amanda Palmer
- Laurie Anderson
- Angel Olsen
- Anna Calvi
- Antony and the Johnsons
- The Appleseed Cast
- Arkells
- Astronautalis
- Autopilot Off
- Baboon
- Baha Men
- Courtney Barnett
- Baroness
- Basement
- Being Dead
- Best Coast
- Better Oblivion Community Center
- Big Harp
- Bill Callahan
- Bitch Magnet
- The Black Angels
- Black Joe Lewis
- Black Mountain
- Black Pumas
- Blondie
- Blood Red Shoes
- Bombay Bicycle Club
- Bono
- Phoebe Bridgers
- Brian Wilson
- Michelle Branch
- Briston Maroney
- Brutal Juice
- Bully
- Brandon Boyd
- David Byrne
- Buddy Miles
- Budos Band
- Chairlift
- Chelsea Wolfe
- Chin Up Chin Up
- Chicano Batman
- Civil Twilight
- Claud
- Clap Your Hands Say Yeah
- Clairo
- Clinic
- Cloud Nothings
- Cults
- Cursive
- Cymbals Eat Guitars
- Death Cab for Cutie
- The Decemberists
- Disappears
- The Dismemberment Plan
- The Districts
- Beth Ditto
- Earl Sweatshirt
- Elvis Perkins
- Erykah Badu
- Everything Everything
- Explosions in the Sky
- Floodlights
- Franz Ferdinand
- Greg Freeman
- Friko
- FFS
- Folk Bitch Trio
- Hohnen Ford
- Foxing (band)
- El Vy
- Ezra Furman
- Future Islands
- Girl in Red
- Goldfrapp
- Good Kid
- Gossip
- The Good Life
- Guster
- Stone Gossard
- Hagfish
- Debbie Harry
- Heartless Bastards
- Honeyblood
- Hrishikesh Hirway
- Islands
- Illuminati Hotties
- Jamie T
- Jens Lekman
- John Grant
- John Vanderslice
- Keren Ann
- Kimbra
- Kirk Franklin
- The Killers
- Lana Del Rey
- Land of Talk
- Lightning Dust
- Little May
- Logh
- Local Natives
- Lou Bega
- Lower Dens
- Lucy Dacus
- Lucius
- Lymbyc Systym
- MC Breed
- Midlake
- Mattiel
- Margot & the Nuclear So and So's
- Manchester Orchestra
- Mannequin Pussy
- Maserati
- Mason Jennings
- Glen Hansard
- Micah P. Hinson
- Miles Kane
- Mini Mansions
- Angie Mcmahon
- Minus Story
- Modest Mouse
- Mogwai
- Mothers
- The Mountain Goats
- Mozella
- Murder By Death
- The Murder Capital
- Nakhane
- Nelly Furtado
- Nilüfer Yanya
- Conor Oberst
- The Octopus Project
- Okkervil River
- Pattern is Movement
- Peach Pit
- Pink Mountaintops
- Phantogram
- The Polyphonic Spree
- Pompeii
- Port O'Brien
- Portugal The Man
- Iggy Pop
- Priests
- PUP
- Raue
- The Regrettes
- Nile Rogers
- Regina Spektor
- Rogue Wave
- The Roots
- Caroline Rose
- Rubblebucket
- Sarah Jaffe
- Sarah Kinsley
- Shame (band)
- Sharon Van Etten
- Shearwater
- Sir Chloe
- Sigur Rós
- Sleater Kinney
- Snooper
- Smog
- Something for Kate
- Sparks
- Spoon
- Spiritual Cramp
- The Staves
- St. Vincent
- Strand Of Oaks
- Suuns
- Moses Sumney
- Swan Lake
- Swans
- Sybris
- Sky Ferreira
- Tegan and Sara
- Thao and the Get Down Stay Down
- The Thermals
- Thrice
- This Will Destroy You
- The Districts
- The Toadies
- Trash Talk
- Treefight for Sunlight
- Two Gallants
- Tomberlin
- Unknown Mortal Orchestra
- Megan Washington
- The Walkmen
- The War on Drugs
- Warpaint
- Waters
- Wallows
- We Ragazzi
- Wild Beasts
- William Elliott Whitmore
- Wires Under Tension
- Whitney
- The Wombats
- Wye Oak
- Ximena Sarinana
- Xiu Xiu
- Vagabon
- Eddie Vedder
- Yico Zeng

== Selected engineering work ==
Congleton has worked with the following musicians and groups.

- Dallas Symphony Orchestra "Dayful of Song"
- Kirk Franklin & The Family - "Kingdom Come" (O.S.T.)
- "Prince of Egypt" (O.S.T.)
- Bono (w/ Kirk Franklin) "Lean On Me"
- Nu Nation Project
- Jackie McCullough "This is for You, Lord"
- The Roots w/ Erykah Badu "You Got Me" (Single)
- MC Breed Let's "Go To the Club"
- Modest Mouse Float on/Bukowski
- Erykah Badu
