= Matt Fishel =

British singer

- Origin: London, England
- Genres: Rock; punk; alternative; pop rock; pop punk; Singer-songwriter
- Occupations: Singer-songwriter; producer
- Instruments: Vocals; piano; guitar; bass; keyboards
- Years active: 2009–present
- Label: Young Lust
- Website: mattfishel.com

Matt Fishel is a British singer, songwriter, musician, music producer and record label owner. He plays guitar, piano, bass and keyboards. He grew up in Nottingham in the East Midlands in the late 1990s, going on to study Music and Performing Arts at Paul McCartney's Liverpool Institute for Performing Arts (LIPA) in the early 2000s, before moving to London, UK, where he currently lives.

== Music and style ==
Fishel's music spans several genres including rock, punk rock and pop punk, Alternative rock and Singer-songwriter storytelling, and draws on influences from modern American rock, college rock, indie rock and Pop music. He grew up listening to Prince and Madonna and, as a teenager, discovered punk and hardcore, which inspired him to want to write songs. Fishel has cited a range of musical influences including American rock bands Jimmy Eat World, Boysetsfire, Green Day, UK rock acts Manic Street Preachers, Skunk Anansie and Funeral for a Friend, as well as pop artists Prince, Madonna, Björk, Seal, Annie Lennox and Pet Shop Boys.

Fishel is openly gay and he is candid and open about his sexuality in the lyrics of his songs. Themes of love, lust, sexuality and education run through his work. His songs and lyrics frequently deal with the "joys, pains and experiences of growing up as a gay teenager and young man".

British actor and writer Stephen Fry has described Fishel's music as "gloriously gay, sweetly romantic, wonderfully touching".

== Career ==
=== 2010–2012 ===
In 2010, Fishel launched his own record label, Young Lust Records, which he runs from his London studio. Tired of being advised by major labels to remove all the references to other men from his songs, Fishel set up his own record label to retain artistic freedom so he would not have to compromise on his music and lyrics.

Fishel's debut single "Football Song" was released worldwide by Young Lust Records on 7 June 2010, with artwork by Italian comic book illustrator Jacopo Camagni. The official music video for "Football Song" is directed by Dan Shipton and features a teenage Fishel (played by Ryan Sampson) reminiscing about a crush on the captain of the school football team, with a present-day Fishel performing the song alongside a team of dancing footballers. Although the single was officially released in June 2010, the music video was uploaded to Fishel's YouTube channel 8 months earlier in October 2009. The fictional football team in the video comprises both professional dancers and members of Stonewall F.C., Britain's first and top-ranking gay football team. Attitude magazine called the song "our 2010 World Cup Anthem" and Fishel's fan base started to grow further after Stephen Fry publicly praised the song and video on Twitter. The video for "Football Song" won the Best Video So Far award at the 2012 RightOut TV Music & Video Awards.

Fishel's second single "The First Time" was released on 7 November 2011. It was released as a three-track single, including two club remixes from Amsterdam remixer and producer Matt Pop. The official music video for "The First Time" was shot in Buenos Aires, Argentina and is directed by Argentinian film director Alexis Dos Santos (Glue, Unmade Beds, Random Strangers). The video was filmed on location in Argentina and tells the story of the first kiss between two teenage boys. The boys are played by Argentinian actors Juan Gabriel Miño and Ronan Nuñez. Fishel does not appear in the video in person, but his image is displayed on one of the boys' T-shirts. Reviews for the song and its accompanying video were positive. Instinct Magazine called it "one of the most adorable music videos we've seen in a long time" and Out magazine's Jon Roth referred to the song as "an empowering soundtrack" and "A music video that will make you want to be a teenager all over again". The Sydney Star Observer called the video "stunning".

In 2012, Fishel released two further singles. The first was "Behind Closed Doors", a "driving pop-rock song" that deals with themes of homophobia and hypocrisy. Released on 9 April 2012, the song went on to win the 2012 Song of the Year award at the 2012 RightOutTV Music & Video Awards.

"Testament" was Fishel's fourth single, released on 28 May 2012. It is a fast-paced punk rock song. The official music video for "Testament" was directed by portrait photographer and visual artist Arno. The video is a mixture of live and archive footage which includes themes of "repression, tradition, marriage, religion and celebration". Fishel can be seen kissing another man in the video. Accidental Bear described "Testament" as "a song of empowerment, encourages you to raise freedom flags and celebrates falling in love...How refreshing to hear something that is more rocking and less clubby." Leo Kristoffersson of So So Gay said: "what we love about Fishel is that he is out and proud...but that he doesn't feel the need to pigeon hole himself as a 'gay singer.' 'Testament' could easily be a Green Day song, with frantic guitars, frenetic beats and a style of vocal delivery usually associated with the lead singers of the best indie bands."

=== 2013 ===
On 10 March 2013, Fishel released a new Lyric video for his fifth single "Radio-Friendly Pop Song". The single was officially released worldwide on 18 March 2013. The song is a comment on Fishel's experiences of the entertainment industry and of being repeatedly advised to remove any openly gay content from his work. In an interview with Blair Martin on Brisbane's Queer Radio 4ZZZ in May 2013, Fishel said that the song was a "fun, tongue-in-cheek response to certain A&R guys in major labels". The song contains elements of pop, rock and punk and includes an a cappella breakdown section. LGBT entertainment blog "The G-List Society" called "Radio-Friendly Pop Song" "our favourite track of 2013" and "the most buzz-worthy song of [Fishel's] discography." They wrote of the song: "This catchy tune serves as a confrontational truth to mainstream music industry's hesitation to allow same-sex love songs to be promoted to the masses. The lyrics blasting status-quo are genius and the choruses are spot on. We have lived to hear many hit singles pushing the buttons of controversy; yet, we have never heard a delectable tune challenging the seemingly homophobic practices of the music industry." Jeremy Feist of Canadian magazine Xtra! said "Radio-Friendly Pop Song" was "really good" and "super catchy". Rebecca Eisenberg of viral content website Upworthy called the song "pitch perfect", saying "when [Fishel] fires back at 2:44, I was grinning like a fool. So good!" Cate Matthews from The Huffington Post called "Radio-Friendly Pop Song" "ridiculously catchy", and said "we're supremely happy that Fishel is standing up and singing his heart out – with one caveat. We don't know how we're ever going to get his songs out of our heads."

Fishel's debut album Not Thinking Straight was released internationally by Young Lust Records on 8 April 2013. The album was produced by both Fishel and UK music producer Mark Crew and contains thirteen tracks that deal with "themes and issues surrounding young gay life, relationships and experiences." Musically, it has been described as "a blend of heavy guitars, big vocal harmonies and anthemic choruses". Not Thinking Straight was released as both a physical CD (on Bandcamp and Fishel's website store) and a digital download (on iTunes and Amazon worldwide). The track listing includes the six singles "Football Song", "The First Time", "Behind Closed Doors", "Testament", "Radio-Friendly Pop Song" and "When Boy Meets Boy" plus album-only tracks "Maybe...", "Nottingham", "Seventeen Again", "Armitage Shanks (Jamie)", "Alastair", "Boxer Shorts & Razor Blades" and "Boys". In the album's sleeve notes, Fishel is credited as performing 'all lead and background vocals, piano, guitars, keyboards and programming' and as the sole composer and lyricist for all 13 tracks. The artwork for Not Thinking Straight was created by San Diego comic book artist and illustrator Joe Phillips. The album cover depicts Fishel as a superhero in cartoon form, with a guitar on his back and piano keys around his hands. The words 'Superfishel Comics' and '#1 First Issue' are also written on the cover. The booklet and CD art contain eighteen original illustrations by Joe Phillips, each representing a different song and its lyrics.

On 2 June 2013, an official music video for "When Boy Meets Boy", Fishel's sixth single from Not Thinking Straight, was released on Fishel's YouTube channel. The video is an animation music video, directed and animated by Joe Phillips. Described by Out Magazine as a "cute (and sexy)" love story "with a superhero twist", it shows an animated version of Fishel meeting a mysterious skater boy in a bar and concludes with a superhero fight and rescue sequence. British magazine The Gay UK called it "one of the best music videos we've seen in a long time." "When Boy Meets Boy" was released internationally as a digital single the following day on 3 June 2013. The three-track bundle includes another club remix by Matt Pop and an acoustic version of the song. The single's artwork is another illustration by Joe Phillips, featuring the two lead cartoon characters from the accompanying music video.

On 30 October 2013, Fishel won another two awards at the annual RightOutTV Music & Video Awards. He picked up the 2013 award for Best Pop/Rock Video for "When Boy Meets Boy" and, for the second year running, he won the Song of the Year award, this time for "Radio-Friendly Pop Song".

In November 2013, Fishel released a cover version of Mariah Carey's 2010 Christmas hit "Oh Santa!", written by Mariah Carey, Jermaine Dupri and Bryan-Michael Cox. The single was released worldwide via digital download on iTunes, Amazon and Google Play on 18 November 2013 as a one-track, non-album single. The artwork for the "Oh Santa!" single is another illustration by Joe Phillips. The cartoon image depicts a Christmas scene in a living room into which Santa Claus is carrying a male character, wrapped up in a bow, while another male character is asleep in a chair. A simple promo video for the song was released on Fishel's YouTube channel. While the original Mariah Carey version of the song incorporates the musical genres of urban, R&B and dance-pop, Fishel's reworking of the song is guitar-led and contains elements of pop punk, rock and pop and incorporates Christmas bells and chimes. Fishel's version keeps the same lyrics from the original version, giving the song a gay male perspective. JD Doyle of Queer Music Heritage wrote of Fishel's version: "I think it's wonderful...he wraps around it his usual perfect power pop arrangement, and of course, [Carey's] lyrics now become male-on-male ones…love, Love!"

In December 2013, Fishel won both the Album of the Year award (for Not Thinking Straight) and the Song of the Year award (for "Radio-Friendly Pop Song") at the 2013 Co-operative Respect 'Loved By You' Awards. The awards were voted for by the public.

=== 2014 ===
Back in May 2013, in an interview with Italian magazine Pianeta Gay, Fishel had announced that he was working on an EP of cover versions, including songs from the 1980s, 1990s and 2000s. On 16 June 2014, Fishel released the artwork for the upcoming EP and announced its title Cover Boy, stating that it would be released on 14 July 2014.

On 22 June 2014, Fishel released the first taste of new music from the upcoming EP in the form of a teaser video on his YouTube channel, for the song "Tonight Is What It Means To Be Young", an epic rock song written by Jim Steinman for the 1984 film Streets of Fire and originally performed by Fire Inc. Fishel's teaser video contains a three-minute preview of his seven-minute track, comprising footage of rain, thunder, lightning, fire and angels, and concludes with a topless male torso emerging through flames, accompanied by two interlocking male symbols, commonly recognised as a gay male symbol.

On 5 July 2014, Fishel announced via his official Facebook page that Cover Boy would include six brand new recordings and a seventh, older track. This would be Fishel's A cappella cover of Björk's song "Hyperballad", taken from her 1995 album Post. Fishel stated that "Hyperballad" would be included on Cover Boy as a bonus track due to his receiving several requests over the years by fans to release it officially after he posted it on his MySpace page a few years earlier in the mid-2000s.

In April 2014, Fishel announced a new video project via his official Facebook page, asking his fans to submit their photographs for an upcoming video. The title and details of the song were not yet revealed, other than that the video would be for one of the songs from his upcoming covers EP. Fishel requested that his fans, regardless of whether they were "gay or straight, transgender, bi, black or white, young or old (or anything in-between)", submit photos of what 'Pride' meant to them, their partners and their friends, with a view to including the submissions in a collaborative music video celebrating international Pride. Fishel asked fans to use his Facebook, Instagram and Twitter pages to send in their submissions. On 13 July 2014, the day before Cover Boy's release, the results of this video project were revealed when an official music video was published on Fishel's YouTube channel for the EP's lead single, a cover of CeCe Peniston's 1991 dance anthem "Finally". The video is animated by Kenneth Wilcox and is a fast-paced photo montage and lyric video "in celebration of gay pride everywhere". The video displays the song's lyrics on the screen alongside all the submitted fan photos, which include many LGBT couples hugging, kissing, getting married and celebrating Gay pride, as well as heterosexual couples and individual 'Selfies'. Fishel maintains the original song's use of male pronouns, giving the song a gay male perspective, and the video opens with the lyrics "Meeting Mr. Right, the man of dreams" displayed on the screen. To accompany the video's release, Fishel posted the following statement underneath the video's credits on his official YouTube channel: "A HUGE heartfelt thank you to everyone who contributed photos for this video and helped to make this a very special project and a celebration of international Pride! I had so much fun going through all the fabulous pics which you sent in from all over the world, representing the United States, United Kingdom, France, Italy, Germany, Spain, Ireland, Australia, South Africa, Argentina, Brazil, Mexico, Uruguay, Philippines, Singapore, Indonesia, Lithuania, Cuba, Thailand and China. Thank you all and I hope you enjoy the results! Mx". Alex Hawley from Outrising.com said of "Finally": "with a distinctly rockier edge than the original's club-infused panache, Matt has also maintained the original's use of male pronouns…which we think is awesome", calling the accompanying music video "the perfect tribute to Pride and Unity".

Cover Boy was released worldwide the next day on 14 July 2014 as a seven-track EP, available as a digital download on all international iTunes, Amazon and Google Play stores. Musically, the EP incorporates elements of Alternative rock, Pop, Rock, Pop rock, Rock opera, and A cappella. The EP contains Fishel's reinterpretations of the aforementioned "Finally", "Tonight Is What It Means To Be Young" and "Hyperballad", as well as four further recordings including: "Summer Rain" (originally performed by Belinda Carlisle and taken from her 1989 album Runaway Horses), "Run With Us" (the official theme tune to the 1980s/1990s animated television series The Raccoons, originally performed by Lisa Lougheed), "Big Casino" (originally performed by Jimmy Eat World and taken from their 2007 album Chase This Light) and "Sky Fits Heaven" (originally performed by Madonna and taken from her 1998 album Ray of Light). Howard Stump of music blog Soundtrack to My Day said of Cover Boy: "Fishel has an amazing grasp of pop music, serving up delicious treats with each release. So when taking on the treats of some of his favorite artists, my expectations were raised… he not only met them, but exceeded my expectations…'Cover Boy' should not be missed at all. The collection is a thoughtful and tuneful journey, one I keep taking again and again." He called Fishel's rendition of "Hyperballad" "special, and should not be missed" and said of "Finally": "the song feels so new, so fresh. I just love it!" On the day following the release of Cover Boy, Grammy Award-winning record producer and songwriter Jim Steinman thanked Fishel for covering "Tonight Is What It Means To Be Young" and publicly praised Fishel's work on his Facebook fan page.

On 10 August 2014, Fishel released a new music video for his cover of "Run With Us", the second single from Cover Boy, on his YouTube channel. The video is a compilation of clips and footage taken from the original animated Canadian television series The Raccoons, from which "Run With Us" was the official theme tune. In Fishel's video, the footage is re-edited together in time to the music as an homage to the show, with scenes matching the song's lyrics. The video was created by Fishel with permission from The Raccoons creator Kevin Gillis, who also co-wrote the song.

In November 2014, Fishel won the 2014 RightOutTV Music & Video Award for Best Lyric Video, for "Finally".

=== 2017–2018 ===
On 1 December 2017, Fishel released new single "Bored of Straight Boys" for download and streaming worldwide, along with an accompanying animated music video on his YouTube channel. Described by Out magazine as "the anti-bro anthem we've all been desperately waiting for", it was the first single to be taken from Fishel's sophomore studio album M/F, due for a 2018 release.

On 26 January 2018, "LGBTQIA (A New Generation)" was released as the second single from M/F. A music video for the single was released on the same day on Fishel's YouTube channel. Described by Gay Times magazine as "a storming queer rock anthem", both the song and video pay tribute to queer history and to all the LGBT+ pioneers, activists and trailblazers who paved the way and broke new ground in the fight for equality. The song is also "a celebration of today's generation of fabulous, open-minded youth" and acts as "a call to arms against those individuals and institutions that still try to oppress freedom, equality and progress". The single came out in conjunction with the UK's LGBT History Month which, in February 2018, marked the fifteenth anniversary of the repeal of Section 28.

Fishel released two further singles from the upcoming M/F in the first half of 2018: "Soldiers" on 23 March and "Twinks" on 1 June.

Fishel's sophomore studio album M/F was released internationally by Young Lust Records on 6 July 2018, on limited edition Vinyl, CD, digital download and streaming services. The album was co-produced by Fishel and UK rock producer Lee Batiuk (Deaf Havana) and mastered by Ted Jensen at Sterling Sound, New York. It features a range of guest musicians including Batiuk, London's The Killer Horns, British singer Zarif, Polish singer Ola Bienkowska, and a cheerleading squad. In terms of lyrical inspiration and themes, Fishel told Out magazine that M/F contains songs "about life from my perspective as an out, proud and happy gay man...politically passionate; in a beautiful, happy relationship; embracing and exploring many aspects of LGBT life whilst on my journey and curiously questioning the world around me and how I fit into it." The overall tone is "positive, upbeat and celebratory, with a little touch of melancholy thrown into the mix every now and then." Some of the songs are "tongue-in-cheek", others explore "many of the joys and complexities that can accompany life as a gay man in the modern world, as well as tributes to different elements of LGBTQ culture, past and present."

On 7 August 2018, Fishel released a live action music video onto his official YouTube channel for M/F's fifth and final single, "I'm Totally Obsessed With Him". It was filmed at London's Shoreditch Town Hall and features Fishel fronting his band and performing choreography alongside an ensemble of dancers and musicians. Stylistically, the video pays tribute to a variety of eras, costumes and looks from queer iconography and history. Upon the video's release, G-scene magazine described Fishel as "unapologetically fabulous".

=== 2021–present ===
On 20 June 2021, Fishel revealed on his official social media accounts that he was building a new studio and working on his fourth album. On 18 October 2022, Fishel announced that his upcoming studio album is called Tales of Queer Suburbia and contains 13 new, original songs.

In 2024, Fishel released six singles from his upcoming album Tales of Queer Suburbia, alongside six corresponding lyric videos: "Lonely Boys (Faster)" on 22 March, "The Queerbaiting Song" on 17 May, "Gym Bunnies" on 14 June, "Heteronormativity" on 8 August, "West Coast Boys" on 5 September and "Alternative Anthem" on 5 December.

On 16 April 2025, Fishel released the album's 7th single, "Gentleman Caller '89", alongside an official music video, which he described as his "big gay '80s hair-rock extravaganza". The video features Fishel and his band performing in a variety of wigs and outfits referencing rock and metal bands of the 1980s era. The song and video also contain lyrical and visual references to female rock singers Cher, Belinda Carlisle, Pat Benatar and Bonnie Tyler. Fishel performs a saxophone solo in the video, as well as an intimate candlelit kissing scene with queer performance artist Sadiq Ali. Marc Andrews of DNA magazine called the video "the sexiest homo metal video you've ever banged your head to."

On 15 May 2025, Fishel released "Masculine Men (It's Only Acting)" - the 8th single from Tales of Queer Suburbia - alongside another corresponding lyric video.

Fishel's fourth studio album Tales of Queer Suburbia was released internationally by Fishel/Young Lust Records on 20 June 2025. It contains thirteen original songs written by Fishel. The album was co-produced by Fishel and Lee Batiuk, who also co-produced Fishel's previous album M/F. It was mixed by Batiuk and mastered by Ted Jensen at Sterling Sound, Nashville. According to the USA's Lavender magazine, Tales of Queer Suburbia is "unapologetically queer" and "features retro throwback influences from the '80s and '90s, music that Fishel grew up listening to. Listeners can hear the sounds of power ballads and rock melodies from the likes of Guns N' Roses, Def Leppard, Cher or Pat Benatar, but the lyrics and melodies take on a deeper meaning with Fishel's lens applied. Songs on the album run the gamut from sad and reflective to joyful and triumphant. Some even get political." Discussing the album in an interview with Shane Lueck for Lavender's 2025 Pride Edition, Fishel said "a lot of [the album] is me looking back as a confident, proud, open gay man on what it was like to be quite repressed many years ago. And also, there's a lot of really fun, positive songs on this album about life now as a gay man, and the different experiences that I'm having in the world now that I wasn't able to have 20 years ago, and I'm putting them all into my songs." Australia's DNA magazine said the album "warrants our immediate attention [with] tales to tempt any queer suburban taste. We also have a soft spot (and hard bulge) for [Fishel's] Baywatch-inspired video for "West Coast Boys" ("picturing belts unbuckling in the burning heat")".

On 21 August 2025, Fishel released an official music video for Tales of Queer Suburbia album track "Class of 28". Shot and edited in the style of a retro VHS home video, it features Fishel performing the song to camera in various bright-coloured t-shirts and Pride-themed outfits. The song is a tribute to the generation of children who went to school in the 1990s under Section 28. Speaking to Lavender magazine, Fishel explained, "[Section 28] made it illegal for schools and public services to promote homosexuality as an acceptable lifestyle. So an entire generation of children, myself included, went to school in a place where it was illegal to be told that it's okay to be gay, or even that gay people exist." He went into further detail in a statement underneath the official video, saying "I never truly realised the long-term effects [Section 28] had had on me personally until much later. I found myself reflecting on this a lot during the pandemic, so decided to channel all my outrage and sadness around this issue into a song. [It's] both a love letter and giant hug to all my LGBTQ+ brothers and sisters [and] a shoutout to those who opposed this bullshit at the time, and who fought tirelessly to get it abolished!"

== Discography ==
=== Albums ===
Year	Title	Label
2013	Not Thinking Straight	Young Lust
2018	M/F	Young Lust
2025	Tales of Queer Suburbia	Young Lust

=== EPs ===
Year	Title	Label
2014	Cover Boy	Young Lust

=== Singles ===
Year	Title	Album
2010	"Football Song"	Not Thinking Straight
2011	"The First Time"	Not Thinking Straight
2012	"Behind Closed Doors"	Not Thinking Straight
2012	"Testament"	Not Thinking Straight
2013	"Radio-Friendly Pop Song"	Not Thinking Straight
2013	'When Boy Meets Boy"	Not Thinking Straight
2013	"Oh Santa!"	non-album single
2017	"Bored of Straight Boys"	M/F
2018	"LGBTQIA (A New Generation)"	M/F
2018	"Soldiers"	M/F
2018	"Twinks"	M/F
2018	"I'm Totally Obsessed With Him"	M/F
2024	"Lonely Boys (Faster)"	Tales of Queer Suburbia
2024	"The Queerbaiting Song"	Tales of Queer Suburbia
2024	"Gym Bunnies"	Tales of Queer Suburbia
2024	"Heteronormativity"	Tales of Queer Suburbia
2024	"West Coast Boys"	Tales of Queer Suburbia
2024	"Alternative Anthem"	Tales of Queer Suburbia
2025	"Gentleman Caller '89"	Tales of Queer Suburbia
2025	"Masculine Men (It's Only Acting)"	Tales of Queer Suburbia

== Videography ==
Year	Title	Director/Producer/Animator
2009	"Football Song"	Directed by Dan Shipton
2011	"The First Time"	Directed by Alexis Dos Santos
2012	"Testament"	Directed by Arno
2013	"Radio-Friendly Pop Song"	Produced by Tyjens Media, animated by Kenneth Wilcox
2013	'When Boy Meets Boy"	Directed and animated by Joe Phillips
2014	"Finally"	Animated by Wilcox
2014	'Run with Us"	Produced and edited by Fishel
2017	"Bored of Straight Boys"	Animated by John Howe
2018	"LGBTQIA (A New Generation)"	Animated by Howe
2018	"I'm Totally Obsessed With Him"	Produced & Directed by Fishel & Joe Bates
2025	"Gentleman Caller '89"	Directed by Bates
2025	"Class of 28"	Directed by Fishel & Bates

== Awards and nominations ==
Year	Nominated work	Award	Category	Result
2012	"Football Song"	RightOutTV Music & Video Awards	Best Video So Far	Won
2012	"Football Song"	RightOutTV Music & Video Awards	Best Song So Far	Nominated
2012	"Behind Closed Doors"	RightOutTV Music & Video Awards	Song of the Year	Won
2012	"Behind Closed Doors"	RightOutTV Music & Video Awards	Best Pop/Rock/Adult Contemporary Song	Nominated
2012	"The First Time"	RightOutTV Music & Video Awards	Best Pop/Rock/Adult Contemporary Video	Nominated
2012	"The First Time"	RightOutTV Music & Video Awards	Best Video (Pro)	Nominated
2013	"When Boy Meets Boy"	RightOutTV Music & Video Awards	Best Video (Pro)	Nominated
2013	"When Boy Meets Boy"	RightOutTV Music & Video Awards	Best Pop/Rock Video	Won
2013	"Radio-Friendly Pop Song"	RightOutTV Music & Video Awards	Best Pop Song	Nominated
2013	"Radio-Friendly Pop Song"	RightOutTV Music & Video Awards	Song of the Year	Won
2013	"Radio-Friendly Pop Song"	Respect Loved by You Awards	Song of the Year	Won
2013	Not Thinking Straight	Respect Loved by You Awards	Album of the Year	Won
2014	"Finally"	RightOutTV Music & Video Awards	Best Lyric Video	Won
