= The First Time (Matt Fishel song) =

Single by Matt Fishel

from the album Not Thinking Straight
- Released: November 7, 2011
- Recorded: 2011
- Length: 3:15
- Label: Young Lust
- Songwriter: Matt Fishel
- Producers: Matt Fishel, Mark Crew

Matt Fishel singles chronology
"Football Song" (2010)	"The First Time" (2011)	"Behind Closed Doors" (2012)

"The First Time" is a song written and performed by British recording artist Matt Fishel. The song was released as a single on 7 November 2011 and appears on Fishel's 2013 debut album Not Thinking Straight.

== Release and lyrics ==
"The First Time" was released on 7 November 2011 as Matt Fishel's second single, taken from his debut album Not Thinking Straight. The single was released worldwide on Fishel's own record label Young Lust Records as a three-track digital download.

Fishel is openly gay and the lyrics of "The First Time" deal with sexual awakenings and his first experience with another boy. In an interview with Jon Roth of Out magazine, Fishel said of the song: "The first time I kissed another boy was an amazing, life-changing moment for me. I can remember the day it happened really vividly and I [wanted] to write a song about all those feelings of warmth and nostalgia that come from that first special moment."

== Matt Pop remixes ==
The single release of "The First Time" includes two club remixes by Amsterdam remixer/producer Matt Pop. The 'Matt Pop '80s Club Mix' and 'Matt Pop '80s Radio Edit' of "The First Time" are both musical reworkings of the song, incorporating Matt Pop's signature 1980s hi-NRG throwback dance-pop sound. The 'Matt Pop '80s Club Mix' of the song also appears as the first track on Almighty Records' 2013 3-disc compilation album We Love Matt Pop, released in May 2013 on both CD and digital download.

== Music video and artwork ==
An official music video for "The First Time" was released on Fishel's YouTube channel on 30 October 2011. The video was shot in Buenos Aires, Argentina and is directed by Argentinian movie director Alexis Dos Santos (Glue, Unmade Beds, Random Strangers). The video was filmed on location in Argentina and tells the story of the first kiss between two teenage boys. The boys are played by Argentinian actors Juan Gabriel Miño and Ronan Nuñez. Fishel does not appear in the video in person, but his image is displayed on one of the boys' T-shirts.

The artwork for the single release is an image taken from the music video, in which the two male characters are lying side by side on a beach. Fishel's image can be seen on the T-shirt of one of the boys.

== Critical reception ==
Reviews for "The First Time" and its accompanying video were positive. British actor and celebrity Tweeter Stephen Fry described "The First Time" as "gloriously gay, sweetly romantic, wonderfully touching music and video". Instinct Magazine called it "one of the most adorable music videos we've seen in a long time" and Out Magazine's Jon Roth referred to the song as "an empowering soundtrack" and "A music video that will make you want to be a teenager all over again". The Sydney Star Observer called the video "stunning".

== Awards and nominations ==
The music video for "The First Time" was nominated for the Best Video (Pro) and Best Pop / Rock / Adult Contemporary Video awards at the 2012 RightOut TV Music & Video Awards.

== Festivals ==
In June 2012, the music video for "The First Time" was screened at the 26th Festival Mix Milano LGBT Festival in Milan, Italy as part of the 'Can't Stop The Music' programme.

== Studio personnel ==
According to the album sleeve notes, "The First Time" was written and arranged by Matt Fishel, produced and engineered by Fishel and Mark Crew at both Superfishel Studios and Unit 24, London UK and mixed by Mark Crew. Fishel performs all lead and background vocals, piano, guitar, synths and programming on the song, with additional guitars and bass by Jonas Jalhay and additional programming by Mark Crew.

== Track listing ==
- Digital download
1. "The First Time" – 3:15
2. "The First Time (Matt Pop '80s Radio Edit)" – 3:49
3. "The First Time (Matt Pop '80s Club Mix)" – 6:17
