= Joe Phillips =

American artist

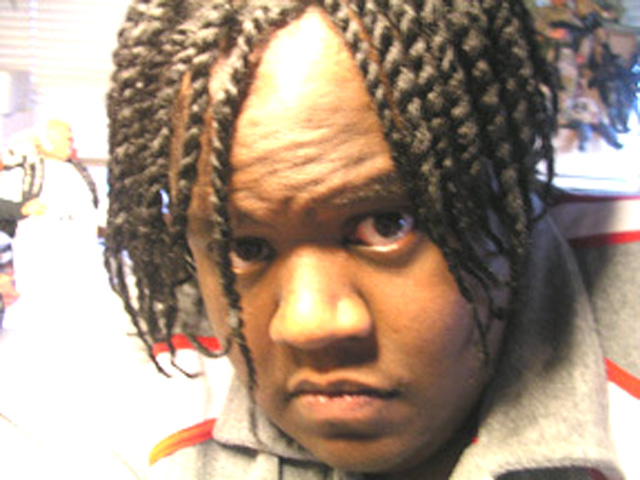
- Joe Phillips
- Born: February 13, 1969 (age 57) Atlanta, Georgia, U.S.
- Areas: Penciller, inker, writer
- Notable works: Timber Wolf, Superboy, Boys Will Be Boys (Calendar/Book), The House of Morecock, Stonewall & Riot
- Awards: GayVN Award, LOGO Music Video of the Year Award; Inkpot Award (2015)

Joe Phillips is an American artist, known for his gay-themed illustration, erotic animation, and his earlier work on superhero comic books.

== Early life ==
Phillips was born in Atlanta, Georgia in 1969. He attended Northside School of the Arts, where he learned skills such as set design and designing costumes. Upon graduation he traveled to Europe where he took part in projects such as guerrilla street art.

== Career ==
=== Comic books ===
Upon his return to the United States, he worked on the comic book series Southern Knights. His first major comic book job was penciling eight issues of the comic book Speed Racer for NOW Comics, starting in 1988. In 1989 he took over penciling interiors and covers for DC Comics' Mister Miracle with issue #7, continuing until the series ended in 1991. He then penciled two issues of Wonder Woman, filling in between retiring artist George Pérez and new regular artist Jill Thompson, and went on to produce art for DC and Marvel Comics titles including Justice League of America, Silver Surfer, X-Men, Legion of Super-Heroes, The Incredible Hulk, and Lobo.

Phillips was one of the founding members of Gaijin Studios, a well-regarded comic book studio whose roster included artists such as Adam Hughes, Dave Johnson, Cully Hamner, Jason Pearson, and Brian Stelfreeze. In late 1992, Phillips penciled a story arc featuring the Legion of Super-Heroes character Timber Wolf, written and inked by Al Gordon. In 1996 he created a new comic book character, Heretic, published by Dark Horse Comics. Other later work included Captain America, Wolverine, Green Lantern, and Superboy. In 2008, Phillips worked on the Doctor Who comic book.

=== LGBT-themed work ===
In his art for the Superboy comic Superboy & Risk: Double Shot, Phillips dropped "easter eggs" hinting at his homosexuality. Eriq Chang, art director of gay-youth-focused XY Magazine, noticed and hired Phillips to draw a comic strip that would become known as "Joe Boy". In September 1999, Phillips co- founded Xodus USA, through which he designed sold clothing and gay-themed accessories, which were carried by online clothing retailer International Male. After that partnership was dissolved in August 2000, Phillips produced calendars and other print materials for 10% Productions. It was during this period that Phillips was engaged by Ska Killers, Toasters, USA.

Phillips was approached by the hardcore porn website Karas Adult Playground to produce adult animation, his first – Cumquest – was a spoof on the popular sci-fi series Star Trek. Another animation job followed for the gay porn website Absolutely Male for which Phillips created the animation The House of Morecock, a story about a gay paranormal investigator. Morecock proved to be very popular and a set of 10 episodes was released on DVD by 10% Productions in 2001. In 2002 Morecock won a GayVN award in the category "Best Alternative Release". A series of comic strip books followed alongside sets of postcard books. TLA Video lists Morecock as one of their all-time bestselling titles.

In 2001 Phillips released "Boys Will Be Boys" - a calendar featuring original gay-themed art. In 2003 a book of the same title was released; it featured the art from the 2002 and 2003 calendars and incorporated some new original pieces. Boys was the first gay-themed comic book that publisher Bruno Gmunder released. Due to its success, in 2007 the book was re-released as an "Extended Edition" containing nearly double the amount of art. The calendar continues to be released annually.

In 2003 Phillips helped launch Xodus Magazine, with former Xodus USA co-founder and current publisher Nicholas Reedy. The magazine was created for the gay community and featured covers, a cartoon series and spot illustration by Phillips as well as a wrap-up column at the end of each issue. The magazine featured an advice column from mothers of gay people. After three years of successful distribution, the magazine ended publication after a long legal battle eventually drained its resources. Other clients who commissioned Phillips for gay work include ID Lube, Elbow Grease, Inside Pride, Jocko Underwear, Odyssey Magazine, Gloss Magazine, Gay and Lesbian Times San Diego, Freshmen, All Boy, Cyber Socket, and Prism Comics plus singers Ari Gold, Justus Boys, Alan Gnuo and Levi Kreis. He also created the art for the comic book character Rage, which featured in the second season of the Showtime series Queer as Folk. In 2004 he was the Artist Guest of Honor at Gaylaxicon, the annual national LGBT science fiction, fantasy, horror, comics and gaming convention.

In 2006 with Adult Visual Animation, Phillips released his second adult-themed animated film, Stonewall & Riot: The Ultimate Orgasm. The film was a cross-over of the two genres Phillips was known for - superheroes and work for the gay community. The film was created entirely in 3D graphics. As with his previous film, Stonewall & Riot was nominated for a GayVN award.

=== Other work ===
Phillips worked for BudLight, for which he created unique art for a nationwide year-long ad campaign featuring his signature "Joe Boys". He also created the artwork for the front cover of multiple "Masterbeat" compilation CD's by DJ Brett Hendricson. He was one of four finalists for a MySpace competition in which Dashboard Confessional searched for their next music video and he was also a finalist in a nationwide advertising campaign by Kraft Foods. A music video for singer Ari Gold which he directed and animated won LOGOs "Music Video of The Year 2007". In late 2008 his comic book creation The Heretic was re-released in a graphic novel format. He has also worked with gay porn producer Chi Chi LaRue to create promotional art for Channel 1 Releasing. In June 2009, Phillips won a Nicky award for "Outstanding Community Artist".

In 2013, Phillips animated and directed the official music video for UK Rock singer/songwriter Matt Fishel's single "When Boy Meets Boy". Described by Out Magazine as a "cute (and sexy)" love story "with a superhero twist", it shows an animated version of Fishel meeting a mysterious skater boy in a bar and concludes with a superhero fight and rescue sequence. British magazine The Gay UK called it "one of the best music videos we've seen in a long time." On 30 October 2013, the video for "When Boy Meets Boy" won the 2013 RightOutTV Music & Video Award for Best Pop/Rock Video. Phillips created the artwork for Matt Fishel's debut album Not Thinking Straight, which was released in April 2013 on Young Lust Records. The album booklet comprises 18 original illustrations by Phillips, each representing a different song's lyrics and portraying themes and issues surrounding young gay life, relationships, and experiences. Phillips created the artwork for Matt Fishel's 2013 singles "Radio-Friendly Pop Song", "When Boy Meets Boy", and "Oh Santa!".

== Bibliography ==
=== Movies ===
- Stonewall & Riot: The Ultimate Orgasm (October 2006)
- The House of Morecock (September 2001)

=== Art books and illustration ===
- Boys Will Be Boys – Extended Edition (April 2007)
- Chasing Adonis: Gay Men And the Pursuit of Perfection (Illustration Only) (January 2007)
- Cali Boys (April 2006)
- Ari Gold (Illustrations only) (October 2005)
- Tales From The House Of Morecock, Vol 2 (September 2005)
- The House Of Morecock (Postcard Book) (August 2005)
- Tales From The House Of Morecock (June 2005)
- The Joy Of Gay Sex (Illustrations Only) (May 2004)
- For The Boys (Postcard Book) (April 2004)
- For The Boys (April 2004)
- The Adventures of a Joe Boy! Volume One (March 2004)
- Reeling in the Years: Gay Men's Perspectives on Age and Ageism (Illustrations only) (January 2004)
- Boys Will Be Boys (Postcard Book) (March 2003)
- Boys Will Be Boys (March 2003)
- Sissyphobia: Gay Men and Effeminate Behaviour (Illustrations Only) (June 2001)

=== Comic books ===
- Doctor Who #1-#2 (January 2008 - February 2008) (penciller)
- Midnighter #3 (March 2007) (penciller)
- 10th Muse #13 (September 2006) (cover artist)
- Prism Comics: Your LGBT Guide To Comics #3 (2005) (cover artist)
- Thundercats: Reclaiming Thundera #5 (February 2003) (penciller & inker)
- Body Doubles #4 (January 2000) (cover artist & penciller)
- Jokers Wild #1 (September 1998) (cover artist & penciller)
- Superboy & Risk: Double Shot #1 (February 1998) (cover artist & penciller)
- The Heretic #1 - #4 (November 1996 - March 1997) (writer, cover artist & penciller)
- Silver Surfer #97 - #100 (October 1994 - January 1995) (cover artist)
- Aliens: Colonial Marines #4-#6, #8-#10 (April 1993 - July 1994) (cover artist)
- Timber Wolf #1 - #5 (November 1992 - February 1993) (cover artist & penciller)
- Wonder Woman #56, #60 (July 1991, November 1991) (penciller)
- Mister Miracle #7 - #28 (August 1989 - July 1991) (cover artist & penciller)
- Speed Racer #12 - #19 (August 1988 - April 1989) (penciller)

=== Video games ===
- My Ex-Boyfriend the Space Tyrant (2012) (character artist)
- Escape from Pleasure Planet (2016) (character artist)
- OscarWildeCard (2023) (character artist)
