= Day of the Destroyer =

Tabletop role-playing game adventure

Cover art by Ben Dunn, 1990

Day of the Destroyer is an adventure published by Hero Games and Iron Crown Enterprises (I.C.E.) in 1990 for the superhero role-playing game Champions.

== Contents ==
In the first Champions adventure, The Island of Dr. Destroyer, the evil supervillain Dr. Destroyer tried to launch a mind-control satellite in order to rule the world. In this adventure, Dr. Destroyer is back with a Doomsday Device that will annihilate 90% of the world's population in 72 hours. The superheroes (player characters) must battle through a group of supervillains, treachery from within and a brainwashed puppet in order to stop Dr. Destroyer.

== Publication history ==
In 1981, Hero Games published the superhero role-playing game (RPG) Champions and its the first adventure, The Island of Dr. Destroyer. Over the next five years, Hero Games published two more editions of Champions, but ran into financial difficulty, and was eventually taken over as a subsidiary of I.C.E. In 1989, Hero Games/I.C.E. published a fourth edition of Champions, and many adventures followed, including a sequel to The Island of Doctor Destroyer, 1990's Day of the Destroyer, a 32-page softcover book written by Scott Bennie, with interior art by Joe Phillips and cover art by Ben Dunn.

In the 2014 book Designers & Dragons, games historian Shannon Appelcline reviewed the entire cycle of Dr. Destroyer adventures, commenting "One of the final fifth edition Champions supplements, Book of the Destroyer (2008), brought the whole line full circle by providing in-depth details on the villain who started things off years earlier in The Island of Dr. Destroyer (1981) and its ICE sequel, Day of the Destroyer (1990). The new Hero's strong focus on a vibrant superhero setting would pay dividends a few years later."

== Reception ==
Sean Holland reviewed the product in the February–March 1991 issue of White Wolf. He stated, "Overall, if you enjoy grand, world saving adventures or confrontations with the most dangerous supervillain around, this adventure is just right for you." He rated it overall at 3 points of a possible 5.
