= Cover Boy (disambiguation) =

Cover Boy may refer to:

- Cover Boy, 2006 Italian film
- Cover Boy (EP), 2014 extended play by Matt Fishel
- James Charles (Internet personality), first male model for CoverGirl sometimes known as "cover boy"
- A man whose photograph features on the front cover of a magazine; see Cover girl
