= Not Thinking Straight (album) =

Studio album by Matt Fishel
- Released: 8 April 2013
- Recorded: 2010–2013
- Genres: Pop punk; power pop; alternative rock; punk rock; electronic dance
- Length: 51:00
- Label: Young Lust
- Producers: Matt Fishel; Mark Crew

Matt Fishel chronology
Not Thinking Straight (2013)	Cover Boy (2014)

Singles from Not Thinking Straight
- 1. "Football Song" Released: 7 June 2010; 2. "The First Time" Released: 7 November 2011; 3. "Behind Closed Doors" Released: 9 April 2012; 4. "Testament" Released: 28 May 2012; 5. "Radio-Friendly Pop Song" Released: 18 March 2013; 6. "When Boy Meets Boy" Released: 3 June 2013

Not Thinking Straight is the debut studio album by British singer, songwriter and recording artist Matt Fishel. It was released internationally on 8 April 2013 through Fishel's own record label Young Lust Records.

== Formats ==
Not Thinking Straight was released as both a physical CD (on Bandcamp and Fishel's website store) and a digital download (on iTunes and Amazon worldwide).

== Style and themes ==
Musically, the album incorporates elements of alternative rock, punk rock, pop punk and rock. It has been described as "a blend of heavy guitars, big vocal harmonies and anthemic choruses". Fishel is openly gay and many of the songs and lyrics on Not Thinking Straight deal candidly with the "joys, pains and experiences of growing up as a gay teenager and young man". The album showcases Fishel's "unique style of songwriting and production" and comprises thirteen tracks that explore love, lust, education, sexuality and "themes and issues surrounding gay life, relationships and experiences". In an interview with RightOutTV, Fishel said of the album: "Some songs are loud, angry and full of energy; some are fun, celebratory or tongue-in-cheek and others are quieter, more reflective and nostalgic." He told Jon Roth of Out Magazine: "There are songs on the album about boyfriends and relationships, coming out and the places I’ve lived, religion, hypocrisy, sexuality and education."

== Artwork and album booklet ==
The artwork for Not Thinking Straight was created by San Diego comic book artist and illustrator Joe Phillips. The album cover depicts Fishel as a superhero in cartoon form, with a guitar on his back and piano keys around his hands. The words 'Super Fishel Comics' and '#1 First Issue' are also written on the cover. The CD version of the album comes with a sixteen-page colour booklet and the iTunes release comes with a digital eighteen-page colour booklet, each containing full artwork, lyrics, credits and thank yous. Both versions of the album booklet are presented in a comic book format. Each contains eighteen original illustrations by Phillips, with each illustration representing a different song's lyrics and showing images of young gay life and relationships.

== Singles, remixes and B-sides ==
Six singles have been released from Not Thinking Straight: "Football Song" (released 7 June 2010), "The First Time" (released 7 November 2011), "Behind Closed Doors" (released 9 April 2012), "Testament" (released 28 May 2012), "Radio-Friendly Pop Song" (released 18 March 2013) and "When Boy Meets Boy" (released 3 June 2013). An a cappella version of album track "Armitage Shanks (Jamie)" was released as a B-side to the "Football Song" single; Amsterdam remixer/producer Matt Pop provided two remixes of "The First Time" for its single release; the "Behind Closed Doors" single includes both a remix of the song by J Stax and an a cappella version of the song performed by Fishel and the "When Boy Meets Boy" single includes an acoustic version of the song and another remix by Matt Pop.

== Music videos ==
Official music videos were released for singles "Football Song" (directed by Dan Shipton), "The First Time" (directed by Alexis Dos Santos), "Testament" (directed by Arno), "Radio-Friendly Pop Song" (produced by Tyjens Media and animated by Kenneth Wilcox) and "When Boy Meets Boy" (directed and animated by Joe Phillips).

== Critical reception ==
Howard Stump of music blog Soundtrack to mMy Day said Not Thinking Straight was: "smart, funny, and still remains honest and very real. And when you pair honesty and smart up so well, it can't help but be kinda sexy, too. Stylistically [there is] a wonderfully eclectic feeling to [Fishel's] music. And while he tells universal stories of love, loss and life, Matt doesn't shy away from the fact he is a gay man, using that experience to enrich the lyrics....[it is] a wonderful journey, touching on aspects of life from teen to adult. The album touches my heart in so many ways, at times making me smile, or give a sigh, or even drop a tear or two. It speaks to our shared histories of love, hurt, and confusion, all part of growing up." Music journalist and broadcaster JD Doyle of Queer Music Heritage said of Not Thinking Straight: "I just love the new Matt Fishel CD! I've been calling his music 'Political Power Pop'...it's music that never even thought about being in the closet."

== Awards and nominations ==
Not Thinking Straight won the Album of the Year award at the 2013 Co-operative Respect 'Loved By You' Awards, voted for by the public.

=== Co-operative Respect 'Loved By You' Awards ===
Year	Nominee / work	Award	Result
2013	Not Thinking Straight	Album of the Year	Won

== Track listing ==
All tracks are written by Matt Fishel.
All songs produced by Fishel and Mark Crew except for "Football Song", produced by Fishel.

CD and digital download
No.	Title	Length
1.	"Radio-Friendly Pop Song"	3:49
2.	"Testament"	3:24
3.	"Behind Closed Doors"	3:30
4.	"The First Time"	3:15
5.	"Maybe..."	3:29
6.	"Nottingham"	4:17
7.	"Seventeen Again"	4:42
8.	"Armitage Shanks (Jamie)"	2:47
9.	"Alastair"	4:37
10.	"Football Song"	4:00
11.	"Boxer Shorts & Razor Blades"	3:43
12.	"Boys"	5:22
13.	"When Boy Meets Boy"	3:45

== Credits and personnel ==
Credits for Not Thinking Straight are adapted from the album's liner notes.

- Album executive producer: Matt Fishel
- All songs written and arranged by Matt Fishel
- Matt Fishel – All lead and background vocals, guitars, piano, keyboards, synths and programming
- Mark Crew – Keyboards and programming
- Jonas Jalhay – Guitars and Bass
- Siri Steinmo – Additional background vocals on "Testament" and "Behind Closed Doors"
- Marcus Bonfanti – Additional guitars on "Football Song"
- All songs (except "Football Song") – Produced by Matt Fishel and Mark Crew / Recorded, engineered and mixed by Mark Crew at Unit 24, London UK / Additional instruments and all background vocals performed, arranged, recorded and engineered by Matt Fishel at Superfishel Studios, London UK
- "Football Song" – Produced, arranged, performed, engineered and mixed by Matt Fishel at Superfishel Studios, London UK / Additional mixing by Jos Jorgensen
- All songs mastered by Streaky for Streaky Mastering
- Album artwork by Joe Phillips
- "Football Song" illustration by Jacopo Camagni
- Matt Fishel photograph by Claire Newman-Williams
