= Cover Boy (EP) =

EP by Matt Fishel
- Released: 14 July 2014
- Recorded: 2013
- Genre: Alternative rock; pop rock; pop punk; power pop; electronic dance
- Length: 34:00
- Label: Young Lust
- Producer: Matt Fishel; Mark Crew

Matt Fishel chronology
| Not Thinking Straight (2013) | Cover Boy (2014) | M/F (2018) |

Cover Boy is an extended play (EP) by British singer and songwriter Matt Fishel. It was released internationally on 14 July 2014 through Fishel's own record label Young Lust Records. The EP comprises seven cover versions. Cover Boy is Fishel's ninth release and his first collection of cover songs.

== Release, style and song choices ==
In May 2013, in an interview with Italian magazine "Pianeta Gay", Fishel announced that he was working on an EP of cover versions, including songs from the 1980s, 1990s and 2000s. On 16 June 2014, Fishel released the artwork for the upcoming EP and announced its title Cover Boy and the release date. Cover Boy was released worldwide on 14 July 2014 as a seven-track digital download on all international iTunes, Amazon and Google Play stores.

Musically, Cover Boy incorporates elements of alternative rock, pop, rock, pop rock, rock opera, and a cappella. The EP contains six new recordings, which include: "Summer Rain", originally performed by Belinda Carlisle and taken from her 1989 album Runaway Horses; "Run With Us", the official theme tune to the 1980s/1990s animated television series The Raccoons, originally performed by Lisa Lougheed; "Finally", originally performed by CeCe Peniston in 1991 and later used in the 1993 film The Adventures of Priscilla, Queen of the Desert; "Big Casino", originally performed by Jimmy Eat World and taken from their 2007 album Chase This Light; "Sky Fits Heaven", originally performed by Madonna and taken from her 1998 album Ray Of Light; and "Tonight Is What It Means To Be Young", written by Jim Steinman for the 1984 film Streets of Fire and originally performed by Fire Inc. Also included on Cover Boy is Fishel's A cappella cover of Björk's song "Hyperballad", taken from her 1995 album Post. Fishel's version is included as the seventh and final track on Cover Boy due to his receiving several requests from fans to release it officially after he posted it on his MySpace page a few years earlier in the mid-2000s.

== Music videos ==
=== "Tonight Is What It Means To Be Young" ===
On 22 June 2014, before the release of Cover Boy, Fishel released a teaser video on his YouTube channel for "Tonight Is What It Means To Be Young". The video contains a three-minute preview of the seven-minute song, comprising footage of rain, thunder, lightning, fire and angels, and concludes with a topless male torso emerging through flames, accompanied by two interlocking male symbols, commonly recognised as a gay male symbol.

=== "Finally" ===
In April 2014, Fishel announced a new video project via his official Facebook page, asking his fans to submit their photographs for an upcoming video. The title and details of the song were not yet revealed, other than that the video would be for one of the songs from his upcoming covers EP. Fishel requested that his fans, regardless of whether they were "gay or straight, transgender, bi, black or white, young or old (or anything in-between)", submit photos of what 'Pride' meant to them, their partners and their friends, with a view to including the submissions in a collaborative music video celebrating international Pride. Fishel asked fans to use his Facebook, Instagram and Twitter pages to send in their submissions.

On 13 July 2014, the day before Cover Boy's release, the results of this video project were revealed when an official music video was published on Fishel's YouTube channel for the EP's lead single "Finally". The video is animated by Kenneth Wilcox and is a fast-paced photo montage video "in celebration of gay pride everywhere". The video displays the song's lyrics on the screen alongside all the submitted fan photos, which include many LGBT couples hugging, kissing, getting married and celebrating Gay pride, as well as heterosexual couples and individual 'selfies'. Fishel maintains the original song's use of male pronouns, giving the song a gay male perspective, and the video opens with the lyrics "Meeting Mr. Right, the man of dreams" displayed on the screen. To accompany the video's release, Fishel posted the following statement underneath the video's credits on his official YouTube channel: "A HUGE heartfelt thank you to everyone who contributed photos for this video and helped to make this a very special project and a celebration of international Pride! I had so much fun going through all the fabulous pics which you sent in from all over the world, representing the United States, United Kingdom, France, Italy, Germany, Spain, Ireland, Australia, South Africa, Argentina, Brazil, Mexico, Uruguay, Philippines, Singapore, Indonesia, Lithuania, Cuba, Thailand and China. Thank you all and I hope you enjoy the results! Mx".

In November 2014, Fishel won the 2014 RightOutTV Music & Video Award for Best Lyric Video, for "Finally".

=== "Run With Us" ===
On 10 August 2014, Fishel released a new music video for "Run With Us", the second single from Cover Boy, on his YouTube channel. The video is a compilation of clips and footage taken from the original animated Canadian television series The Raccoons, from which "Run With Us" was the official theme tune. In Fishel's video, the footage is re-edited together in time to the music as an homage to the show, with scenes matching the song's lyrics. The video was created by Fishel with permission from The Raccoons' creator Kevin Gillis, who also co-wrote the song.

== Critical reception ==
Howard Stump of music blog Soundtrack To My Day said of Cover Boy: "Fishel has an amazing grasp of Pop music, serving up delicious treats with each release. So when taking on the treats of some of his favorite artists, my expectations were raised...he not only met them, but exceeded my expectations...'Cover Boy' should not be missed at all. The collection is a thoughtful and tuneful journey, one I keep taking again and again." He called Fishel's rendition of "Hyperballad" "special, and should not be missed" and said of "Finally": "the song feels so new, so fresh. I just love it!" Alex Hawley from Outrising.com said of "Finally": "with a distinctly rockier edge than the original’s club-infused panache, Matt has also maintained the original’s use of male pronouns...which we think is awesome", calling the accompanying music video "the perfect tribute to Pride and Unity". On the day following the release of Cover Boy, Grammy Award-winning record producer and songwriter Jim Steinman publicly thanked Fishel for covering "Tonight Is What It Means To Be Young" on Fishel's Facebook fan page, saying "Thanks so much for covering one of my favourite songs...Cool job. Like all your stuff!"

== Track listing ==
| No. | Title | Writer(s) | Original artist | Length |
|---|---|---|---|---|
| 1. | "Summer Rain" | Maria Vidal, Robbie Seidman | Belinda Carlisle | 4:41 |
| 2. | "Run With Us" | Kevin Gillis, Jon Stroll, Steve Lunt | Lisa Lougheed | 4:36 |
| 3. | "Finally" | CeCe Peniston, Felipe Delgado, E.L. Linnear | CeCe Peniston | 3:38 |
| 4. | "Big Casino" | Jim Adkins, Rick Burch, Tom Linton, Zach Lind | Jimmy Eat World | 4:14 |
| 5. | "Sky Fits Heaven" | Madonna, Patrick Leonard | Madonna | 4:35 |
| 6. | "Tonight Is What It Means To Be Young" | Jim Steinman | Fire Inc. | 6:54 |
| 7. | "Hyperballad" | Björk | Björk | 4:24 |
