= Hobo with a Shotgun =

2011 film by Jason Eisener

- Theatrical release poster
- Directed by: Jason Eisener
- Written by: John Davies
- Based on: Hobo with a Shotgun by: Jason Eisener; John Davies; Rob Cotterill
- Produced by: Rob Cotterill; Niv Fichman; Paul Gross
- Starring: Rutger Hauer; Gregory Smith; Molly Dunsworth; Brian Downey; Nick Bateman
- Cinematography: Karim Hussain
- Edited by: Jason Eisener
- Music by: Alexander Rosborough
- Production companies: Rhombus Media; Whizbang Films; Yer Dead Productions
- Distributed by: Alliance Films (Canada); Magnet Releasing (United States)
- Release dates: January 21, 2011 (Sundance); March 25, 2011 (Canada); May 6, 2011 (United States)
- Running time: 86 minutes
- Countries: Canada; United States
- Language: English
- Budget: $3 million
- Box office: $834,953

Hobo with a Shotgun is a 2011 exploitation black comedy vigilante film directed by Jason Eisener and written by John Davies. Based on Eisener's fictitious trailer of the same name from Grindhouse (2007), it is the second feature-length adaptation of a fictitious Grindhouse trailer, following Robert Rodriguez's Machete (2010).

Hobo with a Shotgun premiered at the Sundance Film Festival on January 21, 2011, on March 25 in Canada, and on May 6 in the United States. The film received mixed reviews from critics and has become a cult film.

== Plot ==
An unnamed hobo arrives by boxcar in the city of Hope Town, where its graffitied welcome sign reads "Scum Town". The city is ruled over by a ruthless crime lord named "The Drake" and his sadistic sons Ivan and Slick. The Hobo walks the town's suburbs where he watches an amateur filmmaker shooting a Bumfights-style movie with homeless people. Suddenly, a bloodied man named Logan, who is The Drake's younger brother, runs through the streets and screams for help. The Drake and his sons arrive and label him a traitor to the townspeople before publicly decapitating him with a barbed-wire noose attached to a moving car.

Wishing to buy a lawnmower in a pawn shop, the Hobo begs for change on a sidewalk. However, after seeing a group of punks drag in a homeless man, he sneaks into The Drake's nightclub. Inside, the brothers and their henchmen torture and kill homeless people in arcade-style games. Slick begins harassing a boy named Otis, who owes him money, and Ivan snaps Otis' arm. A prostitute named Abby defends Otis. Slick prepares to kill her, but the Hobo knocks him unconscious and carries him to the police station. There, he learns of the police chief's corruption and complicity in criminal activities. The brothers and the chief of police carve "scum" into his chest and throw him into a garbage bin. There, he meets Abby, who helps him recover.

The next day, the Hobo goes to the filmmaker and completes a series of degrading acts, including chewing glass, to get enough money to buy the lawn mower. After getting his money and entering the pawn shop, a trio of robbers hold a woman and her baby hostage. The Hobo grabs a shotgun from the shelf and kills the robbers. Realizing that Hope Town needs justice, he buys the shotgun and proceeds to kill dozens of criminals, including the filmmaker, a pimp, a coke lord, and a pedophile dressed as Santa Claus. The Drake, infuriated, lets his sons loose. They enter a school bus and kill the fourteen children inside (who were friendly to hobos) with a flamethrower and burst into a television station to kill the anchorman during a live broadcast for expressing his appreciation of the hobo. They demand that all homeless people be killed or otherwise they would continue on with their rampage, and a mass purging of the town's homeless is launched. The Drake then joins them and orders the Hobo to be brought before him.

As Abby is walking home, a cop attempts to rape her. The Hobo kills him and Abby smuggles the Hobo past a group in a shopping cart covered with the cop's remains. The pair are spotted by Otis, who informs Slick and Ivan. Back at her apartment, the Hobo tells Abby of his plan to leave the town and start a lawnmowing business, which she enthusiastically supports. Ivan and Slick enter and attack the two, wounding Abby. The Hobo overpowers Slick, holds him at gunpoint, and forces Ivan to retreat. The Hobo then shoots Slick in the groin and takes Abby to the hospital. Slick manages to call the Drake before he is taken to hell in a burning school bus. The Drake, mourning the death of his favorite son, summons "The Plague", a duo of armor-clad demons named Rip and Grinder. While Abby is recovering, the Hobo visits the maternity ward and delivers a monologue to the babies. The Plague slaughters the staff at the hospital while looking for the Hobo. When the latter returns to Abby's room, the Plague captures and delivers him to The Drake, who plans to execute him publicly.

Recovered, Abby returns to the pawn shop for weapons. Attaching an axe to the Hobo's shotgun and retrofitting the lawnmower into a shield, she arms a crowd to free the Hobo and bring down the Drake. She confronts the Drake, holding Ivan hostage; the Drake shoots and denounces him a disappointment, much to Ivan's dismay. In the ensuing fight, Abby kills Grinder. Although the Drake severs Abby's hand with the lawnmower shield, she stabs him repeatedly with her exposed arm bone and incapacitates him. Rip tries to persuade Abby to be his partner, but the Hobo drives him off.

The townspeople, motivated by Abby's bravery, show up with their own weapons and proceed to aim them at the shocked police, who demand that they leave the area. Seeing that the police will kill the people they failed to protect against the criminals, the Hobo tells the Drake that on their upcoming ride to Hell "You're riding shotgun," and blows his head off. The police shoot the Hobo, and the people avenge him and turn their guns on the police. Both groups exchange fire, while the Hobo dies and Abby's screams are heard.

=== Alternative ending ===
In an extended ending that was taken out from the final cut of the film, Abby's hand is replaced by a gatling-style shotgun as she becomes a new member of the Plague.

== Cast ==
- Rutger Hauer as The Hobo, a homeless man who becomes a vigilante after witnessing Hope Town's high crime rate and corrupt, ineffective police.
- Molly Dunsworth as Abby, a local sex worker who befriends the Hobo, she became at first horrified by his actions then after watching his bravery decides to aid him.
- Brian Downey as "The Drake", a ruthless psychopathic crime lord and the de facto leader of Hope Town, the father of Ivan and Slick.
- Gregory Smith as "Slick", Drake's favorite son and Ivan's brother. Slick is a highly remorseless, sadistic, and cold killer. His father prefers him over Ivan due to his intelligence and leadership skills.
- Nick Bateman as Ivan, Drake's son and Slick's equally sadistic but much dimmer brother.
- Nick Bateman and Peter Simas as Rip and Grinder, known as The Plague, two armored demons who seem to be contract killers with a hit list of historical and Biblical figures such as Abraham Lincoln, Joan of Arc, Charles Darwin and Jesus Christ.
- Robb Wells as Logan, Drake's brother and a traitor for hobos
- Jeremy Akerman as The Chief of Police
- David Brunt as Corrupt Police Officer
- Drew O'Hara as Otis
- Pasha Ebrahimi as The "Bumfights" director
- George Stroumboulopoulos as The News Anchor

== Development ==
Hobo with a Shotgun, directed by Jason Eisener, was initially a fake trailer made for an international contest to promote the release of Quentin Tarantino and Robert Rodriguez's double feature Grindhouse. It won the contest, and was screened in some areas of Canada as part of the actual release of Grindhouse. A feature-length version of Hobo with a Shotgun began principal photography in Halifax on April 19, 2010.

A teaser trailer (including behind-the-scenes and test footage) was released on April 26, 2010. David Brunt, who played the homeless man in the trailer, cameos in the film as a cop. It was the second of Grindhouse's fake trailers to be turned into a feature film, the first being Machete.

The opening theme music was borrowed from the exploitation film Mark of the Devil. The song "Run with Us", performed by Lisa Lougheed, from the 1980s animated series The Raccoons, is played in the end credits.

== Release ==
Hobo with a Shotgun had a world premiere at the 2011 Sundance Film Festival. The film was released on a limited basis to Canadian theatres on March 25, 2011, and American ones on May 6, 2011. The film was also released via OnDemand services such as Xbox Live, PlayStation Network, and iTunes on April 1, 2011.

== Home media ==
The film received its Australian premiere on the opening night of the Sydney Film Festival on June 8, 2011. It was later released on DVD and Blu-ray Disc in the United States on July 5, 2011, and in the UK on July 15, 2011.

== Reception ==
Reviews of the film upon its release were generally mixed-to-positive, and it currently holds a 66% approval rating out of 119 reviews on the review aggregate website Rotten Tomatoes with an average rating of 5.7 out of 10 and with the consensus being, "It certainly isn't subtle – or even terribly smart – but as a gleefully gory homage to low-budget exploitation thrillers, Hobo with a Shotgun packs plenty of firepower." Metacritic, which uses a weighted average, assigned the film a score of 55 out of 100, based on 22 critics, indicating "mixed or average" reviews. In his review for National Public Radio, Scott Tobias wrote "There's something pure about the crude pleasures of Hobo with a Shotgun, a pre-fab cult film that aspires to nothing more (or less) than the red-meat feeding of a feral midnight-movie audience", and that the film is "just raw sensation, built on a series of shocks that keep topping themselves for cartoonish grotesquerie". Writing in Film Journal International, Maitland McDonagh described the film as "a pitch-perfect recreation of the brutal, low-budget crime films of the 70s, which is simultaneously the best and the worst thing about it". In his negative review of the film Ty Burr wrote in The Boston Globe that although it "revels in the trash aesthetic of ’70s trash cinema, from its over-saturated colors to its intentionally bad acting", the film "illustrates a modern B-movie principle: If you set out to parody junk, you will more than likely end up with junk".

In 2023, Barry Hertz of The Globe and Mail named the film as one of the 23 best Canadian comedy films ever made.
