= Football Song (song) =

Single by Matt Fishel

from the album Not Thinking Straight
- Released: 7 June 2010
- Recorded: 2010
- Length: 4:00
- Label: Young Lust
- Songwriter: Matt Fishel
- Producer: Matt Fishel

Matt Fishel singles chronology
"Football Song" (2010)	"The First Time" (2011)

"Football Song" is a song written, produced and performed by British recording artist Matt Fishel. The song was released as his debut single on 7 June 2010 and appears on his 2013 debut album Not Thinking Straight.

== Release, lyrics and artwork ==
"Football Song" was first released on 7 June 2010 as Fishel's debut single and the first single to be taken from his 2013 debut album Not Thinking Straight. The single was released worldwide on Fishel's own record label Young Lust Records as a two-track digital download.

The lyrics of "Football Song" are sung from the perspective of a young gay schoolboy with a crush on the straight captain of the school's football team. The lyrics tell of a relationship between the two boys, but it is ambiguous whether or not the relationship is real or imagined in the narrator's mind.

The artwork for the single is an illustration by Italian comic book illustrator Jacopo Camagni and portrays the song's relationship between the schoolboy and the footballer.

=== B-side ===
The B-side to "Football Song" is "Armitage Shanks (Jamie) [Acapella]", an a cappella version of a song which was later released with different production and arrangement on Fishel's debut album Not Thinking Straight.

== Music video ==
The official music video for "Football Song" is directed by Dan Shipton and features Fishel performing on the piano and singing alongside a team of dancing footballers. The video also features two actors playing Fishel's younger self (Ryan Sampson) and the footballer referred to in the song's lyrics. The fictional football team in the video comprises both professional dancers and members of Britain's first and top-ranking gay football team, Stonewall F.C.

== Awards ==
The music video for "Football Song" won the Best Video So Far award at the 2012 RightOut TV Music & Video Awards. It was also nominated for Best Song So Far.

=== RightOutTV Music & Video Awards ===
Year	Nominee / work	Award	Result
2012	"Football Song"	Best Video So Far	Won
2012	"Football Song"	Best Song So Far	Nominated

== Critical reception ==
British actor and celebrity tweeter Stephen Fry publicly praised the song and video on Twitter, causing it to become a "YouTube sensation". Attitude Magazine called the song "our 2010 World Cup Anthem". Laurence Watts of PinkNews said "Football Song" had "echoes of Jonathan Harvey's Beautiful Thing...It's an uplifting tune, worthy of chart-toppers like the Feeling." GayNI Magazine called it "honest, touching and entertaining".

== Personnel ==
According to the album sleeve notes, "Football Song" was written, produced, arranged, engineered and mixed by Fishel at Superfishel Studios, UK. Fishel performs all lead and background vocals, piano, guitar, synths and programming on the song, with additional guitars by Marcus Bonfanti and additional mixing by Jos Jorgensen.

== Track listing ==
- Digital download
1. "Football Song" – 4:00
2. "Armitage Shanks (Jamie)" (acapella) – 2:59
