= Behind Closed Doors (Matt Fishel song) =

Single by Matt Fishel

from the album Not Thinking Straight
- Released: 9 April 2012
- Recorded: 2012
- Genre: Pop rock
- Length: 3:30
- Label: Young Lust
- Songwriter(s): Matt Fishel
- Producer(s): Matt Fishel, Mark Crew

Matt Fishel singles chronology
"The First Time" (2011)	"Behind Closed Doors" (2012)	"Testament" (2012)

"Behind Closed Doors" is a song written and performed by British recording artist Matt Fishel. The song was released as a single on 9 April 2012 and appears on Fishel's 2013 debut album Not Thinking Straight.

== Style and lyrics ==
"Behind Closed Doors" is a "driving pop-rock song" that deals lyrically with themes of homophobia, hypocrisy and faux-tolerance. Fishel is openly gay and the song was inspired by his real-life experiences. When discussing the song's lyrics in an interview with Nick Bond of Australia's Sydney Star Observer, Fishel said: “...whether you're gay or belong to any minority group, you often encounter people who like to profess their worldly views and open-mindedness, and then follow up with one of those classic lines like ‘As long as it’s not in front of me’.” In an interview with JD Doyle of Queer Music Heritage, Fishel said "Behind Closed Doors" was about "[that] hypocrisy that you often hear from certain people, when [they] go, 'I'm cool that you're gay, I just don't want to see it.' And that drives me mad."

== Release and B-sides ==
"Behind Closed Doors" was released on 9 April 2012 as Fishel's third single, taken from his debut album Not Thinking Straight. The single was released worldwide on Fishel's own record label Young Lust Records as a three-track digital download, including the original album version of "Behind Closed Doors", a remix by J Stax and an a cappella reworking of the song.

== Music video ==
Whilst no official music video for "Behind Closed Doors" has been released, a simple promo video for the song showcasing the single's artwork was released on Fishel's YouTube channel on 5 April 2012, four days before the single's official release.

== Awards and nominations ==
"Behind Closed Doors" won the 2012 "Song Of The Year" award at the 2012 RightOutTV Music & Video Awards. It was also nominated for Best Pop/Rock/Adult Contemporary Song.

=== RightOutTV Music & Video Awards ===
Year	Nominee / work	Award	Result
2012	"Behind Closed Doors"	Song Of The Year	Won
2012	"Behind Closed Doors"	Best Pop / Rock / Adult Contemporary Song	Nominated

== Personnel ==
According to the album sleeve notes, "Behind Closed Doors" was written and arranged by Matt Fishel, produced and engineered by Fishel and Mark Crew at both Superfishel Studios and Unit 24, London UK and mixed by Crew. Fishel performs all lead and background vocals, piano, guitar, synths and programming on the song, with additional guitars and bass by Jonas Jalhay, additional programming by Crew and additional background vocals by Siri Steinmo.

== Track listing ==
- Digital download
1. "Behind Closed Doors" – 3:30
2. "Behind Closed Doors (J Stax Remix)" – 4:36
3. "Behind Closed Doors (Acapella Version)" – 3:29
