= Big Casino =

Single by Jimmy Eat World

from the album Chase This Light
- Released: August 28, 2007
- Recorded: 2007
- Genre: Alternative rock
- Length: 3:40
- Label: Interscope
- Songwriter(s): Jim Adkins; Rick Burch; Zach Lind; Tom Linton
- Producer(s): Butch Vig

Jimmy Eat World singles chronology
| "Nothingwrong" (2005) | "Big Casino" (2007) | "Always Be" (2007) |

"Big Casino" is a song by American rock band Jimmy Eat World from their sixth studio album Chase This Light, which was released on October 16, 2007. The single was released on August 28, 2007. The song impacted radio on September 11, 2007.

== History ==
The song title is taken from the name of a side project of Jimmy Eat World singer Jim Adkins, named Go Big Casino.

While the band is from Arizona, the chorus refers to "a New Jersey success story". Adkins said, "That song was about someone who happened to be from New Jersey that for whatever reason, felt that they never got their shot in life. I used New Jersey because no one celebrates their hometown heroes like they do." He said about Bruce Springsteen, Bon Jovi and The Gaslight Anthem that "they really rally behind their musical heroes over there."

The song premiered on Jimmy Eat World's official website, and the album Chase This Light's official new website. Some time after, it was added to a revamped Jimmy Eat World Myspace page. On October 16, 2007, the song was physically released as a single.

== Critical reception ==
Slant Magazine's Jonathan Keefe said it wasn't as powerful as "The Middle", but gave it praise for having "a memorable guitar riff and [exploding] into a massive chorus." Brian Hiatt of Rolling Stone was critical of the song's use of synths but still praised it as "an exhilarating seize-what’s-left-of-the-day anthem." Despite giving a negative review of the album and criticizing the track's lyrical missteps, Andrew Blackie from PopMatters called it "a decent rocker with one of the best examples of a soaring ‘emo’ chorus of the year."

Uproxx listed it as Jimmy Eat World's 18th best song and said it "drew equally on Bleed American as it did Sam's Town".

== Music video ==
A screen capture from the music video

The Big Casino video was shot at the Las Vegas Neon Museum Boneyard in a single day (with a return for pickups at night), featuring the band playing among the yard's old billboards and casino neon signs. While the band plays during parts of the verses Jim Adkins is seen walking around parts of the yard dragging his guitar with him. As the video progresses it switches between night and day, with many of the billboards and signs being lit up, with the moon also in view.

The video premiered on Yahoo October 22, 2007 followed by being added to Jimmy Eat World's official website on October 23, 2007, and moments later was added to Jimmy Eat World's YouTube and Universal Music's YouTube.

== Charts ==
| Chart | Peak position |
|---|---|
| Billboard Canadian Hot 100 | 59 |
| Venezuela Top Anglo (Record Report) | 9 |
| U.S. Billboard Bubbling Under Hot 100 Singles | 22 |
| U.S. Billboard Modern Rock Tracks | 3 |
| UK Singles | 119 |

== Track list ==
UK 7"/CD

1. Big Casino – 3:40
2. Beautiful Is – 2:30

UK 7"

1. Big Casino – 3:40
2. Open Bar Reception – 3:54

== Matt Fishel cover ==
In 2014, "Big Casino" was recorded by British singer Matt Fishel for his EP of cover versions, titled Cover Boy. Fishel's version of the song, produced by Fishel and Mark Crew, is more acoustic and stripped back than Jimmy Eat World's original. It is at a slower tempo and incorporates piano, acoustic and electric guitars, drums and strings, along with Fishel's layered vocals and multiple harmonies. According to Howard Stump of music blog Soundtrack To My Day, Fishel "really brings the melody to life in his version", which appears as the fourth track on Fishel's Cover Boy EP, released internationally by Young Lust Records on July 14, 2014.
