= Radio-Friendly Pop Song =

Single by Matt Fishel

from the album Not Thinking Straight
- Released: 18 March 2013
- Recorded: 2013
- Length: 3:49
- Label: Young Lust
- Songwriter(s): Matt Fishel
- Producer(s): Matt Fishel, Mark Crew

Matt Fishel singles chronology
"Testament" (2012)	"Radio-Friendly Pop Song" (2013)	"When Boy Meets Boy" (2013)

"Radio-Friendly Pop Song" is a song written and performed by British recording artist Matt Fishel. It was released as a single on 18 March 2013 and appears as the opening track on Fishel's 2013 debut album Not Thinking Straight.

== Themes and lyrics ==
Lyrically, "Radio-Friendly Pop Song" is a comment on homophobia in certain parts of the music and entertainment industries. Fishel has described the song as both a "fun, tongue-in-cheek response to certain A&R guys in major labels" and as "an anthem of pride in celebration of the LGBTQ community." The song is inspired by Fishel's experiences of the entertainment industry as an out, gay artist and of being repeatedly advised to remove any openly gay content from his work. The lyrics to the first verse of the song talk about the music industry and the second verse refers to Hollywood and the movie business. In an interview with Northern Ireland's GayNI Magazine, Fishel said "Radio-Friendly Pop Song" is "based on my (and many others') experiences of being a gay artist in the entertainment industry, and the latent homophobia that still lies underneath the surface of certain corporate companies. I've had meetings in the past with A&R guys from the majors who have said to me: 'your songs are great, you just need to get rid of all the gay content, you should sing about girls so as not to alienate your audience'." He went on to say "I've always felt uncomfortable with the idea of deliberately 'dumbing down' my lyrics for any kind of commercial gain...So I wanted to write a fun, tongue-in-cheek response to those people, which basically says 'I'm gay, I'm out and I'm proud, I'm not prepared to hide from that and I'm gonna be true to who I am.'"

== Release and artwork ==
"Radio-Friendly Pop Song" was released on 18 March 2013 as Fishel's fifth single, taken from his debut album Not Thinking Straight. The single was released worldwide on Fishel's own record label Young Lust Records as a one-track digital download. The artwork for the single is an illustration by San Diego comic book artist and illustrator Joe Phillips and is taken from the Not Thinking Straight album booklet. The image incorporates themes from the song's lyrics. It portrays two male characters, one of whom is playing guitar. They are kissing in front of three businessmen, each of whom is covering either their eyes, ears or mouth. There are gold discs on the wall and the Hollywood sign is in the background.

== Critical reception ==
The response to "Radio-Friendly Pop Song" was positive. British actor and celebrity tweeter Stephen Fry wrote about the song the day after its release, calling it "fabulous". LGBT entertainment blog The G-List Society called "Radio-Friendly Pop Song" "our favourite track of 2013" and "the most buzz-worthy song of [Fishel's] discography." They wrote of the song: "This catchy tune serves as a confrontational truth to mainstream music industry's hesitation to allow same-sex love songs to be promoted to the masses. The lyrics blasting status-quo are genius and the choruses are spot on. We have lived to hear many hit singles pushing the buttons of controversy; yet, we have never heard a delectable tune challenging the seemingly homophobic practices of the music industry." Jeremy Feist of Canadian magazine Xtra! said "Radio-Friendly Pop Song" was "really good" and "super catchy". Rebecca Eisenberg of viral content website Upworthy called the song "pitch perfect", saying "when [Fishel] fires back at 2:44, I was grinning like a fool. So good!" Cate Matthews from The Huffington Post called "Radio-Friendly Pop Song" "ridiculously catchy", and said "we're supremely happy that Fishel is standing up and singing his heart out - with one caveat. We don't know how we're ever going to get his songs out of our heads."

== Music video ==
An official music video for "Radio-Friendly Pop Song" was released on Fishel's YouTube channel on 10 March 2013, produced by Tyjens Media and animated by Kenneth Wilcox. The video is a lyric video which incorporates all the song's lyrics, animated at a fast pace in time to the song.

== Awards and nominations ==
"Radio-Friendly Pop Song" won the 2013 "Song Of The Year" award at the 2013 RightOutTV Music & Video Awards. It was also nominated for "Best Pop Song". The song also won the Song Of The Year award at the 2013 Co-operative Respect 'Loved By You' Awards, voted for by the public.

=== Co-operative Respect 'Loved By You' Awards ===
Year	Nominee / work	Award	Result
2013	"Radio-Friendly Pop Song"	Song of the Year	Won

=== RightOutTV Music & Video Awards ===
Year	Nominee / work	Award	Result
2013	"Radio-Friendly Pop Song"	Song of the Year	Won
2013	"Radio-Friendly Pop Song"	Best Pop Song	Nominated

== Festivals ==
In June 2013, the music video for "Radio-Friendly Pop Song" was screened at the 27th Festival Mix Milano LGBT Festival in Milan, Italy as part of the 'Can't Stop The Music' programme.

== Personnel ==
According to the album sleeve notes, "Radio-Friendly Pop Song" was written and arranged by Fishel, produced and engineered by Fishel and Mark Crew at both Superfishel Studios and Unit 24, London, UK and mixed by Crew. Fishel performs all lead and background vocals, guitars, synths and programming on the song, with additional guitars and bass by Jonas Jalhay and additional programming by Crew.

== Track listing ==
- Digital download
1. "Radio-Friendly Pop Song" – 3:49
