= Gaijin Studios =

American comic book artists

Background information
- Origin: Atlanta, Georgia
- Years active: 1991–2010
- Past members: Brian Stelfreeze; Cully Hamner; Karl Story; Doug Wagner; Laura Martin; Adam Hughes; Jason Pearson; Joe Phillips; Stine Walsh; Jason Martin; Dave Johnson; Tony Harris; Tony Shasteen; Rick Mays; Georges Jeanty; Kelsey Shannon

Gaijin Studios was a group of American comic book artists formed in Atlanta, Georgia. It was one of the longest-running collectives of freelance comic book artists in the United States, in continuous operation for nineteen years, from 1991 to 2010. It has long been considered by many in the comics industry to be an influential training ground for some of the more prominent creators of the 1990s and 2000s, including Dave Johnson, Adam Hughes, Brian Stelfreeze, Cully Hamner, Joe Phillips, Jason Pearson, Jason Martin, Tony Harris, Laura Martin, Karl Story, Doug Wagner, and Tony Shasteen.

On April 1, 2010, Gaijin Studios announced that after almost nineteen years, they would be closing the studio for the foreseeable future, calling it an "indefinite hiatus".
