= The House of Morecock =

2001 film by Joe Phillips

- DVD Front Cover
- Directed by: Joe Phillips
- Written by: Joe Phillips, B. Colt, Darren Catheart, R.J. Zebley
- Produced by: Joe Phillips; Lex Wolfcraft; Ron McFee
- Starring: Joe Phillips; Jason Rodriguez
- Release date: September 14, 2001
- Running time: 61 minutes
- Country: United States
- Language: English

The House of Morecock is a gay pornographic adult cartoon created through computer-generated animation. It was the first American-made gay adult animation, and was created by Joe Phillips, a comic book artist and freelance illustrator who has created art for companies such as DC Comics, Dark Horse Comics and Bud Lite. It is Phillips' first DVD movie after the first release of Phuckamon; a second, unrelated film titled Stonewall & Riot: The Ultimate Orgasm was released in late 2006 and a sequel was announced in August 2008.

== Overview ==
The House of Morecock debuted in 1999 on the gay porn website AbsolutelyMale. It was originally a short Flash animation featuring Jonas Morecock, a blond-haired, blue-eyed gay twenty-something who investigates mysterious or supernatural goings-on. The stories always end with Jonas engaged in comical gay sex with apparitions, vampires, and other spooky entities.

Due to its initial success, Phillips followed up the original episode with a complete set of shorts, all featuring Jonas in various scary situations which always subsequently turn sexual. Following their popularity online, the episodes were released on DVD in 2001 under the full title The House of Morecock: The Animated Misadventures of Jonas Morecock. In 2002, the DVD won a GayVN Award. TLAvideo.com lists the film as one of its best-selling DVD titles ever.

In 2005, following on the success of the DVD, two sets of comic strip books were released, titled Tales From The House Of Morecock and Tales From The House Of Morecock Vol. 2, along with a set of postcards featuring the titular character. The series is considered pornography, but its content is lighthearted and is depicted in short skits. It is only considered hardcore because of graphic gay sex scenes. The stories are always comic and are intended to entertain as much as they are to arouse.

== Plot ==
The movie starts off with the live-action sequence of two real-life men lying in bed watching Saturday morning cartoons. They then find The House of Morecock on television, and the viewer then watches what the twosome can see on their TV. We are then introduced to Jonas Morecock, and we then follow him on a series of adventures, including meeting Bigfoot, a chance encounter with a merman and being face to face with the Loch Ness Monster. All of the situations end up with Jonas having sex with at least one other man.

The film parodies a lot of mainstream television and films, including The Little Mermaid, The Blair Witch Project, Godzilla, The X-Files, Titanic, Psycho and Jaws. There are a total of ten episodes contained on the DVD, each featuring a different story involving Jonas.

== Reception and reviews ==
The House of Morecock was widely praised upon its release. IN TOUCH magazine said it was an "original work that remains innocent even at its most explicit... a sexy and humorous collection". Out Front Colorado stated "[It] sets new trends in exotic animation". The Virginia Gayzette remarked, "Full of wit and humor. Breaks new ground. Morecock is destined to become a collectible. Finally, TLA Video said "Wildly imaginative! The drawings are excellent".

== Rating ==
In the United States, Morecock is unrated, which means it does not need to pass MPAA approval, but is rated 18 Up by Kitty Media. In the United Kingdom, the film is rated R18 which means it can only be sold in licensed sex shops. In order to obtain the R18 rating, certain shots had to be cut: in total 1m 34s was removed from the original US version of the film. The uncut version is still available in the US.

== In other media ==
In addition to the short cartoons, a spin-off set of books were created in 2005 by Joe Phillips, the titles of which are:

- Tales From The House Of Morecock (Released June 2005)
- The House Of Morecock (Postcard Book) (Released August 2005)
- Tales From The House Of Morecock, Vol 2 (Released September 2005)

In an online-only short movie, the audience is introduced to Justin Morecock, the younger brother of Jonas, in a tale called Goldilocks and the Three Bears in which Justin has a four-way orgy with three bears. Justin Morecock appears in this one short Flash animation only and has not been mentioned since. Visually, his appearance is almost exactly the same as Jonas, except that Justin has a middle-parting haircut.
