= When Boy Meets Boy =

Single by Matt Fishel

from the album Not Thinking Straight
- Released: 3 June 2013
- Recorded: 2013
- Length: 3:45
- Label: Young Lust
- Songwriter: Matt Fishel
- Producers: Matt Fishel, Mark Crew

Matt Fishel singles chronology
"Radio-Friendly Pop Song" (2013)	"When Boy Meets Boy" (2013)	"Oh Santa!" (2013)

"When Boy Meets Boy" is a song written and performed by British recording artist Matt Fishel. It was released as a single on 3 June 2013 and appears as the closing track on Fishel's 2013 debut album Not Thinking Straight.

== Style, themes and lyrics ==
"When Boy Meets Boy" is a fun, quirky and up-tempo song. The song also incorporates various sound effects, including wolf-whistling, snoring and a cell phone ringing, each punctuating certain lyrics. Lyrically, the song tells the story of a relationship between Fishel and 'Marcus', a "Ska Punk-loving" skateboarder who Fishel meets in a bar. They end up going back to Marcus' apartment where Fishel spends the night and they fall in love. In an interview with JD Doyle of Queer Music Heritage in April 2013, Fishel said "When Boy Meets Boy" was a "celebratory song about meeting another guy, and having a fun relationship. The guy in this song...is a hot skater guy [who's] into punk rock. For me this song is positive and jubilant and it's just putting it out there and saying, you know, it's great when two guys fall in love...it's wonderful and exciting and we should celebrate."

== Release and B-sides ==
"When Boy Meets Boy" was released on 3 June 2013 as Fishel's sixth single, taken from his debut album Not Thinking Straight. The single was released worldwide on iTunes and Amazon via Fishel's own record label Young Lust Records, as a three-track digital download. The digital bundle includes the original album version of "When Boy Meets Boy", the "Matt Pop Cartoon Club Mix" (a reworking of the song by Amsterdam remixer/producer Matt Pop which incorporates Pop's signature 1980s hi-NRG throwback dance-pop sound) and an acoustic version of the song, featuring the stripped-back production of piano and vocals only.

=== Artwork ===
The artwork for the "When Boy Meets Boy" single is an illustration by Joe Phillips and features the two cartoon characters from the accompanying music video, standing side by side. The Matt Fishel character has a guitar on his back and the 'Marcus' character is carrying a skateboard.

== Music video ==
The official music video for "When Boy Meets Boy" is an animation video, directed and animated by San Diego comic artist and illustrator Joe Phillips. In an interview with Nicola Migliore for Italian magazine Pianeta Gay in May 2013, Fishel spoke about the upcoming music video for "When Boy Meets Boy", saying: "the lyrics are very narrative so it seemed like the perfect choice for an animation [video]. The song is a celebration of being gay, so we have created a fun, joyful, colourful cartoon which tells the story of the song’s lyrics and includes some surprises too." The official music video was released on Fishel's YouTube channel on 2 June 2013, a day before the single was released. Described by Out Magazine as a "cute (and sexy)" love story "with a superhero twist", it shows an animated version of Fishel meeting mysterious skater boy 'Marcus' in a bar. They go back to Marcus' apartment, where they spend the night together. The video includes scenes of gay sex, but all the while the characters' genitals are obscured by yellow stars. The video also includes chibi character versions of Fishel and 'Marcus'. The video concludes with a superhero fight and rescue sequence as Fishel's character is attacked in an alleyway by a gang of villains and the 'Marcus' character emerges as a skateboard-carrying superhero to rescue him. The video ends with the two characters kissing and the image becomes a still frame of a comic book titled 'Superfishel Comics'. British magazine The Gay UK said "When Boy Meets Boy" was "one of the best music videos we've seen in a long time." Accidental Bear called it "superbly animated" and "super cute!" Crew magazine said "the animated music video for Matt Fishel’s “When Boy Meets Boy” hits all the right notes. It's romantic, irreverent, and just the perfect amount of sexy. Also, the fact that the tune is catchy and sweet helps too."

== Awards and nominations ==
"When Boy Meets Boy" won the 2013 Best Pop/Rock Video award at the 2013 RightOutTV Music & Video Awards. It was also nominated for Best Video (Pro).

=== RightOutTV Music & Video Awards ===
Year	Nominee / work	Award	Result
2013	"When Boy Meets Boy"	Best Pop/Rock Video	Won
2013	"When Boy Meets Boy"	Best Video (Pro)	Nominated

== Studio personnel ==
According to the album sleeve notes, "When Boy Meets Boy" was written and arranged by Matt Fishel, produced and engineered by Matt Fishel and Mark Crew at both Superfishel Studios and Unit 24, London UK and mixed by Mark Crew. Fishel performs all lead and background vocals, guitars, synths and programming on the song, with additional guitars and bass by Jonas Jalhay and additional programming by Mark Crew.

== Track listing ==
- Digital download
1. "When Boy Meets Boy" – 3:45
2. "When Boy Meets Boy (Matt Pop Cartoon Club Mix)" – 5:27
3. "When Boy Meets Boy (Acoustic Version)" – 3:45
