= Fernando Tielve =

Spanish actor (born 1986)

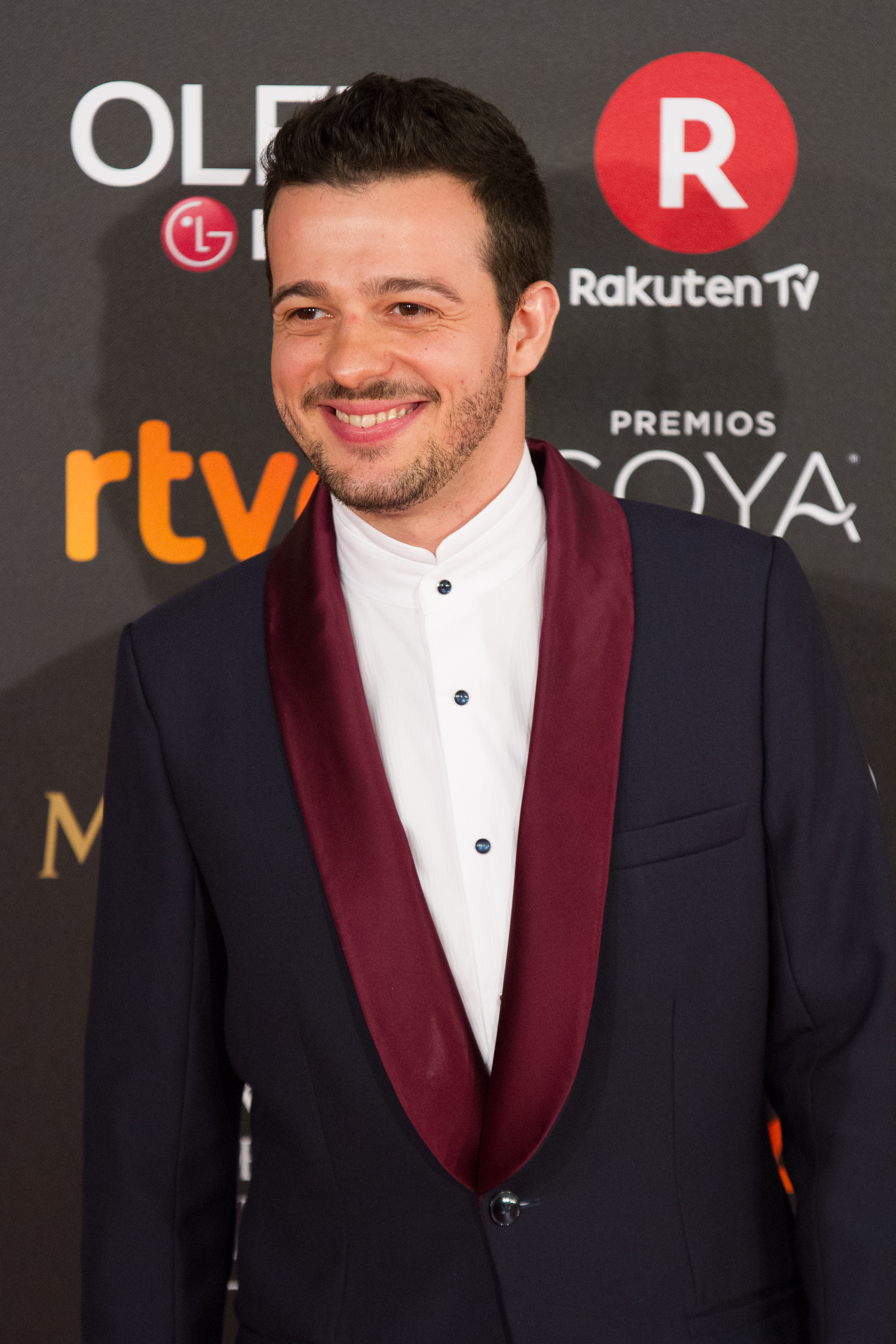
- At the 32nd Goya Awards in 2018
- Born: José Fernando Tielve Asensao; 21 July 1986 (age 39); Madrid, Spain
- Occupation: Actor

José Fernando Tielve Asensao (born 21 July 1986) is a Spanish actor, known for his performances in films such as The Devil's Backbone and The Shanghai Spell and the television series El internado.

== Biography ==
José Fernando Tielve Asensao was born on 21 July 1986 in Madrid, developing an interest in acting at a young age. He made his television debut as the son of the Ana Obregón's character in A las once en casa. At age 13, he was cast for the lead role of the young boy Carlos (10-year-old) in the Guillermo del Toro's film The Devil's Backbone, making his feature film debut. His performance earned him an award to Best Young Actor in an International Film at the Young Artist Awards in 2002. He also starred in Fernando Trueba's The Shanghai Spell next to Aida Folch and Juanjo Ballesta.

He was cast as Cayetano en the television series El internado, playing the role between 2007 and 2008 for 22 episodes. Yet following the onscreen death of the character (the first corresponding to a protagonist), and Tielve's subsequent exit from the series, his visibility in Spain faded substantially. He featured in a minor role in Rage (produced by Del Toro) as the grandson of the character played by Concha Velasco. He starred in the 2009 British film Unmade Beds as Axl, a transplant from Spain, and as the title character in the 2010 indie film 14 Days with Victor opposite to Margo Stilley.

== Filmography ==
Film

Year	Title	Role	Notes	Ref
2001	El espinazo del diablo (The Devil's Backbone)	Carlos		
2002	El embrujo de Shanghai (The Shanghai Spell)	Dani		
2006	El laberinto del fauno (Pan's Labyrinth)		Cameo	
2006	Goya's Ghosts	Álvaro Bilbatúa		
2007	Mujeres en el parque			
2009	Rabia (Rage)			
2009	Unmade Beds	Axl		
2010	14 Days with Victor	Victor		
2010	La vida empieza hoy			
2011	Seis puntos sobre Emma (Six Points About Emma)	Diego		
2013	Lose Your Head	Luis		
2017	Patria	Policeman		
2020	Los Visitados	Lucas		

Television

Year	Title	Role	Notes	Ref
2007–08	El internado	Cayetano	Main	
