= Dave Johnson (comics) =

American comic book artist

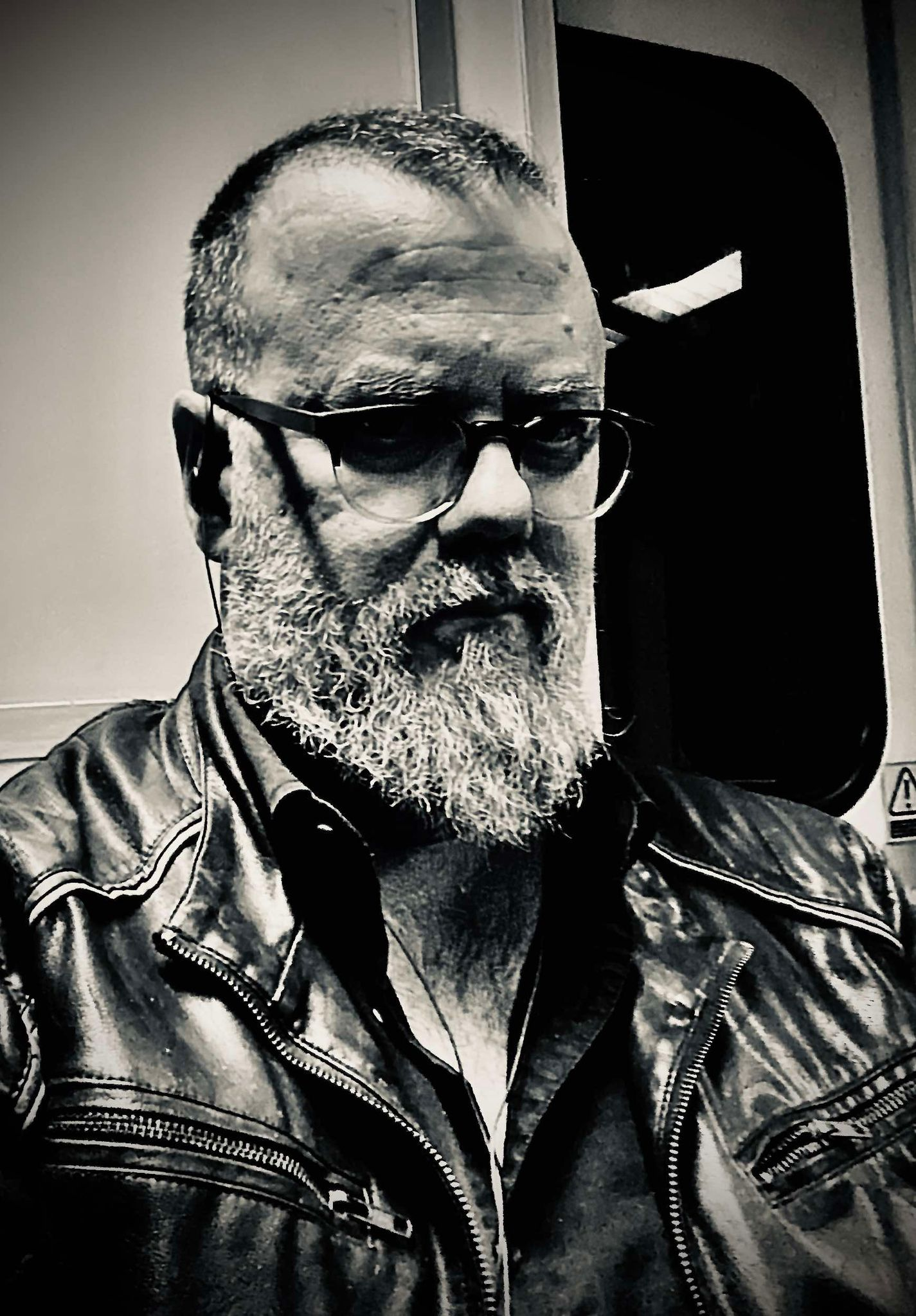
Dave Johnson - Artist

Dave Johnson is a comic book artist known for his cover work. For Image Comics he has worked on titles including Erik Larsen's SuperPatriot and Robert Kirkman's Invincible. For DC Comics he has provided covers to titles such as Detective Comics and the DC/Vertigo book 100 Bullets, for which he won the 2002 Eisner Award for Best Cover Artist. His Marvel Comics work includes covers for Deadpool. He has also done some writing, as on Batman: Black and White #6 and Batman: Legends of the Dark Knight #194.

In 2022, he was among the three dozen contributors to the benefit book Comics for Ukraine: Sunflower Seeds, whose profits would be donated to relief efforts for Ukrainian refugees resulting from the February 2022 Russian invasion of Ukraine.

== Early life ==
Dave Johnson was born in Pittsburgh, and moved to Georgia as a child. He has an older sister. He discovered comics as a child, but subsequently lost interest in them. His interest in the medium was renewed in the late 1970s, beginning with Chris Claremont and John Byrne's run on The Uncanny X-Men. Johnson has named Byrne and Michael Golden as two of his main influences. Johnson studied painting at the Art Institute of Atlanta, but ultimately became more interested in illustration, specifically on the ability to instantly convey information in a single image, explaining at WonderCon in 2009, "[With] billboards, you have five seconds to deliver a message." Applying this idea to comics covers, he said, "You're walking down the aisle (at your comic shop), and the simpler the design, and the brighter and bolder the covers, the better an idea it is. You say 'Batman,' and get the whole message at once." He created a portfolio of work and sent it to various Comic companies.

== Career ==
He is one of the original members of Gaijin Studios in Atlanta, along with a number of other well-known artists, including Adam Hughes, Brian Stelfreeze, Cully Hamner and Jason Pearson.

In 2002 Johnson was awarded the 2002 Eisner Award for Best Cover Artist for his work on the DC Comics book Detective Comics and the DC/Vertigo book 100 Bullets. He had published covers for Detective Comics for a two-year long run.

In April 2022, Johnson was reported among the more than three dozen comics creators who contributed to Operation USA's benefit anthology book, Comics for Ukraine: Sunflower Seeds, a project spearheaded by editor Scott Dunbier, whose profits would be donated to relief efforts for Ukrainian refugees resulting from the February 2022 Russian invasion of Ukraine. Johnson would provide one of the covers to the softcover version of the book.

Johnson created the poster for the American TV series Agents of S.H.I.E.L.D. episode "Afterlife".

In 2024, Johnson would be a recipient of the Inkpot Award at the annual San Diego Comic Con.

== Bibliography ==
Some of the comic work he was published;

=== DC ===
- Superman #709 (May 2011) (cover only)

=== Marvel ===
- Fury: My War Gone By (2012-2013) - covers

=== Dark Horse Comics ===
- Bloodhound Volume 2: Crowbar Medicine (2013)
- Dark Horse Presents #23 (21 )
- James Bond 007 #1 (cover A Regular)
- Kabuki Library Volume 4 by David Mack
- Dead Inside #1 (cover) (written by John Arcudi) (2016)

=== Caliber Press ===
- Negative Burn #12 - "14.2.99" (1994)
- Elementals: The Natural Order

== Technique and materials ==
When doing covers, Johnson prefers to think out all of his preliminary work for a week before rendering his ideas within an hour. He does not like presenting editors with a large number of cover ideas, preferring instead to deliver the final products. When painting, Johnson begins by applying the darkest pigments, before layering on lighter colors with acrylic, saying, "I'm trying to be less opaque and more brushy. I'm a terrible painter; it's a pure accident that it comes out as good as it does." When doing painted covers, he prefers do so fully, without completing a substantial amount of the image digital, although he does employ a digital greywash technique for layering.
