= Testament (song) =

Single by Matt Fishel

from the album Not Thinking Straight
- Released: 28 May 2012
- Recorded: 2012
- Length: 3:24
- Label: Young Lust
- Songwriter: Matt Fishel
- Producers: Matt Fishel, Mark Crew

Matt Fishel singles chronology
"Behind Closed Doors" (2012)	"Testament" (2012)	"Radio-Friendly Pop Song" (2013)

"Testament" is a song written and performed by British recording artist Matt Fishel. The song was released as a single on 28 May 2012, and appears on Fishel's 2013 debut album Not Thinking Straight.

== Style and lyrics ==
"Testament" was written by Matt Fishel. Lyrically, it deals with themes of authority, tradition, repression, religion, education and sexuality. When discussing the song's lyrics in an interview with JD Doyle of Queer Music Heritage in April 2013, Fishel said: ""Testament" is about all the influences that can shape who you are as a person, and make you confused or question your place in the world...all these voices that are constantly coming at you from everywhere as you're growing up, whether it's your parents or your school, or religious teachers telling you who you can be, who you should be, what you [ought to] do with your life. I wanted to write a song that's about finding your place, and how you fit into the world." In the same interview Fishel, who is openly gay, said that "ultimately, "Testament" is a celebration of liberation and personal and sexual freedom and saying...I'm going to find my own path, and I'm going to celebrate that." He also described "Testament" as "probably my angriest song on the album".

== Release ==
"Testament" was released on 28 May 2012 as Fishel's fourth single, taken from his debut album. The single was released worldwide on Fishel's own record label Young Lust Records as a one-track digital download.

== Music video ==
An official music video for "Testament" was released on Fishel's YouTube channel on 20 May 2012. It is directed by portrait photographer and visual artist Arno. The video combines a wealth of archive footage showing images of repression, tradition, marriage, religion and sexual celebration, with live footage of Fishel performing the song, all edited together at a fast pace. Fishel can be seen kissing another man in the video.

In August 2013, after Russia passed federal laws to ban the "promotion of homosexuality to minors", Fishel added Russian subtitles to the "Testament" video on YouTube, "in support of Russia's LGBTQ community." He added a note underneath the video, saying: "I believe it's extremely important for those of us who have freedom and equality to speak up for those who are having theirs taken away and who are being silenced every day. I wrote "Testament" as both a protest song against 'The Establishment' - against out-dated rules, tradition and the old-fashioned notion of what it is to be 'normal' - and also as a celebration of sexuality, freedom and personal liberation. The song is about challenging the system and choosing the path that is right for us, despite the obstacles that may have been put in our way. Sadly, our Russian brothers and sisters are having these choices taken away from them and it somehow felt right to translate the song into Russian. Hopefully this small gesture can help show young gay and LGBT Russians that they are not alone during this crazy time. Let's keep signing the petitions, protesting these draconian new laws and calling for action in every way we can. In solidarity."

== Critical reception ==
Reviews for "Testament" and its accompanying video were positive. Accidental Bear described "Testament" as "a song of empowerment, encourages you to raise freedom flags and celebrates falling in love...How refreshing to hear something that is more rocking and less clubby." The song was named as one of So So Gay's Singles Of The Week on its release in May 2012, with Leo Kristoffersson of So So Gay writing: "what we love about Fishel is that he is out and proud...but that he doesn't feel the need to pigeon hole himself as a 'gay singer.' "Testament" could easily be a Green Day song, with frantic guitars, frenetic beats and a style of vocal delivery usually associated with the lead singers of the best indie bands", adding "it really is very good indeed." UK arts blog The Kaje said that "Testament" had "a throbbing sexuality oozing both from the track and the stunningly compiled Arno video....with Fishel demonstrating a versatility that really kicks into gear and gets the heartbeat pounding." British actor Tom Hiddleston tweeted about the song and video shortly after the release, calling Fishel "a man of many talents".

== Personnel ==
According to the album sleeve notes, "Testament" was written and arranged by Matt Fishel, produced and engineered by Fishel and Mark Crew at both Superfishel Studios and Unit 24, London, UK and mixed by Crew. Fishel performs all lead and background vocals, guitar, synths and programming on the song, with additional guitars and bass by Jonas Jalhay, additional programming by Crew and additional background vocals by Siri Steinmo.
