= The Island of Dr. Destroyer =

Tabletop role-playing game adventure

Cover art by Mark Williams, 1981

The Island of Dr. Destroyer is an adventure published by Hero Games in 1981 for the superhero role-playing game Champions.

== Plot summary ==
Supervillain Dr. Destroyer has created a secret stronghold on the island of Destruga, from which he plans to control the entire planet using his soon-to-be-launched Hypnoray satellite. In The Island of Dr. Destroyer, the players must raid the island fortress to stop Dr. Destroyer's nefarious plot. The adventure includes details on the defenses, guards, vehicles, troops, and supervillains that can be found on the island.

== Publication history ==
The Island of Dr. Destroyer was the first adventure created for the Champions role-playing game. The adventure was written by Steve Peterson and George MacDonald, with artwork by Mark Williams, and was published by Hero Games in 1981 as a 16-page book. Day of the Destroyer is its sequel.

In his 2014 book Designers & Dragons, Shannon Appelcline noted that after the publication of Champions, "Hero Games wasted no time in expanding their game. They had two supplements — the NPC book Enemies (1981) and the adventure The Island of Dr. Destroyer (1981) — ready to go by the next local convention."

== Reception ==
In the April–May 1982 edition of White Dwarf (Issue #30), Dave Morris admitted this adventure was "logically thought-out and clearly presented." But he questioned whether players would be interested in playing larger-than-life superheroes in a real world setting, since "much of the appeal of a game like D&D lies in having fairly believable characters adventuring in a fantasy world." However he concluded, "All the same, the occasional bout of world-saving might be really enjoyable" and gave The Island of Dr. Destroyer an above-average rating of 8 out of 10.

In the August 1982 of Abyss, Dave Nalle noted that this adventure "is unusually well-organized and easy to follow in running and set-up. Everything is set out in what I think of as the most logical order, so I found it a breeze to go through. There are an unusually complete set of maps as well." Nalle concluded, "It is a fairly fast run but gives a really good feel for how such an adventure should be set up so that the GM can use it as an example for future scenarios."

In the September–October 1984 edition of Different Worlds (Issue 36), Russell Grant Collins called this adventure "well laid out", but thought the opposing supervillains "are not detailed at all." He also noted that although there are options to make the adventure easier if the player characters seem over-matched, there were no options to make the adventure more difficult if the superheroes "appear to be able to mop the floor with the villains provided without working up a sweat." Collins concluded "Overall, I find it difficult to recommend this module [...] Unless you're really hurting for a villain's secret hideout, skip this one."

In the December 1984 edition of Imagine (Issue 21), Pete Tamlyn noted that the supervillains used in this adventure were simply villains from the previously published supplement Enemies, forcing the gamemaster to buy both products in order to play this adventure, something that Tamlyn called "quite naughty."
