= Nick Bateman (model) =

Canadian actor and model

- Bateman in 2026
- Born: Nicholas Kevin Stanley Yunge-Bateman; November 18, 1986 (age 39); Burlington, Ontario, Canada
- Occupations: Model; Actor
- Years active: 2007–present
- Spouse: Maria Corrigan (m. 2019)
- Children: 2

Nicholas Kevin Stanley Yunge-Bateman (born November 18, 1986) is a Canadian model, actor and author.

== Career ==
At a young age, Bateman began martial arts training in Gōjū-ryū karate and bō staff. In his teens Bateman won four world titles in the National Blackbelt League's 15-17 age division, with three in weapons as well as one in Japanese forms in Houston and Myrtle Beach in 2003 and 2004 He graduated from Capilano University in Vancouver at age 20, and later opened his own karate school. Shortly thereafter, he began modeling professionally, during which time he lived in Milan, as well as New York City and Miami. He was once chosen for an Abercrombie & Fitch Campaign, which was photographed by Bruce Weber.

Bateman is also a film and television actor and starred in the 2011 film Hobo with a Shotgun, he also starred in the 2019 Hallmark Channel television film A Brush With Love where he played the male lead opposite actress Arielle Kebbel. He starred in the 2021 GAC Family movie A Christmas Miracle for Daisy alongside Jill Wagner. In 2024, he was cast in the second season of the American drama series, When Hope Calls.

== Personal life ==
Bateman has two dogs, both Yorkies, named Joey and Keeva. He volunteered with PETA to bring hay and repair shelters for dogs kept outside in North Carolina.

Bateman began dating Maria Corrigan in July 2008. They married in 2019 and have two sons.

== Filmography ==
Film
Year	Title	Role	Notes
2011	Ethos	Nick	Short film
2011	Hobo with a Shotgun	Ivan / Rip	
2014	Tapped Out	Matt Cockburn	
2014	Hidden in the Woods	Chris	
2016	Total Frat Movie	AJ Chesterfield	
2017	Gambit	Remy "Gambit" LeBeau	Short film
2017	Apple of My Eye	Dr. Grant	
2017	A Winter Wedding	Lucas Pierce	GAC Family Television film
2018	The Matchmakers Playbook	Ian Hunter	Passionflix Movie
2018	The Perception	Matt Saunders	
2019	Airplane Mode	Nick Bateman	
2020	Gambit: Play for Keeps	Remy "Gambit" LeBeau	Short film

Television
Year	Title	Role	Notes
2007	Just for Laughs	Sideswipe Performer	1 episode
2011	Originals	Lance	7 episodes
2012	Space Janitors	Jarok Zayne	
2012	My Babysitter's a Vampire	Maitre'd Vampire	1 episode
2013	Mr. D	Craig	1 episode
2013	The Listener	Ian Furmanek	1 episode
2014	The Hazing Secret	Mike	Lifetime Television film
2019	A Brush With Love	Max Hughes	Hallmark Channel Television film
2021	A Christmas Miracle for Daisy	Conner Sheenan	GAC Family Television film
2024	Operation Mistletoe	Ryan	Hulu film
2025	When Hope Calls	Wyatt	TV series
2026	Love Under the Mistletoe	Ryan St. Nichloas	Hallmark Movie

== Awards ==
Year	Awards	Category	Result	Ref.
2016	Golden Maple Awards	Outstanding Social Media Achievement	Won	
