= Alexis Dos Santos =

Argentine film director and producer

- Born: 1974 (age 51–52)
- Occupations: Film director and producer, screenwriter and editor
- Known for: Part of the New Queer Cinema movement
- Notable work: Glue

Alexis Dos Santos (born 1974) is an Argentine film director and producer, screenwriter and editor. He has also shot a number of short and directed music videos. He is considered part of the New Queer Cinema movement.

Dos Santos studied in Buenos Aires and Barcelona before relocating to London in 1998, where he attended the National Film and Television School. He started filming short films like Meteoritos, Watching Planes, Axolotll, Snapshots and Sand.

In 2006, he wrote and directed his debut long feature Glue (full title Glue - Historia adolescente en medio de la nada) about young musicians in drug use and sexual exploration. It won a number of prizes including the MovieZone Award at the International Film Festival Rotterdam (IFFR) in 2007 In 2009, he directed Unmade Beds that was featured at the 2009 Sundance Film Festival and at Febiofest 2010. The film was partially funded by the UK Film Council and was nominated for Grand Jury Prize - World Cinema / Dramatic in Sundance Festival. For the Cinema Reloaded project, in 2011 he directed the short film Random Strangers.

== Filmography ==
=== Directing and screenwriting ===
Feature films

- 2006: Glue
- 2009: Unmade Beds
- 2019: Monos - (Screenwriter)

Shorts

- 1997: Meteoritos
- 2001: Sand
- 2002: Axolotl
- 2011: Random Strangers

=== Editing ===
- 2013: Bends

=== Producing ===
- 1997: Meteoritos
- 2006: Glue
- 2013: Night

=== Acting ===
- 1997: Meteoritos
- 2009: Unmade Beds as Alejo

=== Music videos ===
(Selective)

- 2011: Matt Fishel - "The First Time"

== Awards and nominations ==
Glue

- 2006: Won MovieZone Award at the Rotterdam International Film Festival (IFFR)
- 2006: Won Best Local Film at Buenos Aires International Festival of Independent Cinema
- 2006: Won Young Audience Award at Nantes Three Continents Festival
- 2006: Nominated for Golden Montgolfiere at the Nantes Three Continents Festival
- 2007: Won Best First Feature - World Cinema at the San Francisco International Lesbian & Gay Film Festival

Unmade Beds

- 2009: Nominated for Grand Jury Prize — World Cinema / Dramatic during Sundance Film Festival
- 2009: Won Crystal Arrow at Les Arcs Film Festival
- 2009: Won Quebec Film Critics Award / Special Mention at Montréal Festival of New Cinema
