= Unmade Beds (2009 film) =

Unmade beds
- Directed by: Alexis Dos Santos
- Written by: Alexis Dos Santos; Marianela Maldonado
- Produced by: Peter Ettedgui; Soledad Gatti-Pascual
- Starring: Fernando Tielve; Déborah François; Michiel Huisman; Iddo Goldberg; Richard Lintern; Katia Winter
- Cinematography: Jakob Ihre
- Edited by: Olivier Bugge Coutté
- Production companies: Film4; UK Film Council
- Distributed by: Soda Pictures
- Release dates: 16 January 2009 (Sundance); 2 September 2009 (United States); 11 December 2009 (United Kingdom)
- Running time: 97 minutes
- Country: United Kingdom
- Languages: English; French; Spanish; Italian
- Box office: $180,144

Unmade Beds is a 2009 British comedy-drama film directed Alexis Dos Santos and starring Fernando Tielve, Déborah François, Michiel Huisman, Iddo Goldberg, Richard Lintern and Katia Winter. The film was featured at the 2009 Sundance Film Festival and at Febiofest 2010.

== Plot ==
The film tells the story of a couple of young people trying to deal with their life problems. A 20-year-old boy from Spain, Axl, travels to London to find his father who left during his childhood and who Axl doesn't remember anything about. A Belgian girl, Vera, came to London to overcome a recent breakup. They both try alcohol, random sex encounters, dancing, and music, but neither of them finds what they are looking for - until one day they meet and are then ready to move on with their lives.

== Cast ==
- Fernando Tielve as Axl
- Déborah François as Vera
- Michiel Huisman as X Ray Man
- Iddo Goldberg as Mike
- Richard Lintern as Anthony Hemmings
- Katia Winter as Hannah
- Alexis Dos Santos as Alejo
- Lucy Tillett as Lucy
- Al Weaver as Kevin

== Production ==
The film uses quick razor cuts with blurred background and various sound changes to deliver the natural experience of the environment and the feeling of people involved.

== Accolades ==
- 2009: Nominated for Grand Jury Prize - World Cinema / Dramatic during Sundance Film Festival
- 2009: Won Crystal Arrow at Les Arcs European Film Festival
- 2009: Won Quebec Film Critics Award / Special Mention at Montréal Festival of New Cinema
