= Glue (film) =

2006 Argentine movie

- Directed by: Alexis Dos Santos
- Written by: Alexis Dos Santos
- Starring: Nahuel Pérez Biscayart; Nahuel Viale; Inés Efron; Verónica Llinás; Héctor Díaz
- Release date: 26 August 2006
- Running time: 110 minutes
- Countries: United Kingdom; Argentina
- Languages: Spanish, English

Glue, or Glue – Historia adolescente en medio de la nada, is a 2006 Argentine film written and directed by Argentine film director Alexis Dos Santos and was his debut long feature film.

== Plot ==
The movie is set in Zapala, a small town in Neuquén Province, Patagonia, Argentina. It follows the story of Lucas (Nahuel Pérez Biscayart), a 16-year-old boy who plays in a punk rock band with his friend Nacho (Nahuel Viale). The plot takes a turn when Lucas meets a girl named Andrea (Inés Efron), and the three of them embark on a journey of drug use and sexual exploration.

== Awards ==
- 2006: Won MovieZone Award at the Rotterdam International Film Festival (IFFR)
- 2006: Won Best Local Film at Buenos Aires International Festival of Independent Cinema
- 2006: Won Young Audience Award at Nantes Three Continents Festival
- 2006: Nominated for Golden Montgolfiere at the Nantes Three Continents Festival
- 2007: Won Best First Feature – World Cinema at the San Francisco International Lesbian & Gay Film Festival
