= Brian Stelfreeze =

American comic book artist

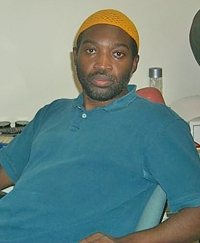
- Brian Stelfreeze
- Born: August 16, 1962 (age 64)
- Areas: Writer, Penciller, Artist, Inker, Colourist
- Notable works: CyCops, Shadow of the Bat, The Ride, Domino, Matador, Gun Candy, The Ride: Die Valkyrie, Black Panther
- Awards: Inkpot Award (2014); Glyph Comics Award (2017)

Brian Stelfreeze is an American comic book artist. Stelfreeze is a painter, penciller, inker and colorist and has worked for nearly every major American comic book publisher. He is one of the original members of Atlanta's Gaijin Studios.

== Career ==
Stelfreeze began his career as the artist of the sci-fi miniseries CyCops in 1988.

While Stelfreeze has been known throughout his career primarily as a cover artist, painting more than fifty cover illustrations for DC Comics' Shadow of the Bat, he has also produced a significant amount of sequential work, including the miniseries Domino for Marvel Comics and Matador for DC Comics' Wildstorm imprint.

Currently, Stelfreeze acts as art director for 12 Gauge Comics and occasionally has provided artwork for their series The Ride, and its prequel, Gun Candy. He also worked on the Walt Simonson-written Demon/Catwoman feature in DC Comics' Wednesday Comics.

Stelfreeze is the artist on the 2016 revival of Marvel's Black Panther with writer Ta-Nehisi Coates.

In 2020 Stelfreeze launched Thomas River, a spy series with a 40-page first issue. He created the art for the series, and co-wrote the series with Doug Wagner. The first issue was crowdfunded through Kickstarter, surpassed its funding stretch goal of $30,000, and was published by 12 Gauge Comics.

== Awards ==
- 2014 Inkpot Award
- 2017 Glyph Comics Award for "Best Artist" (for Black Panther)
