= Run with Us =

Single by Lisa Lougheed

from the album Evergreen Nights
- B-side: "Hold Back Tomorrow"
- Released: November 1987
- Recorded: 1987
- Genre: Dance-rock
- Length: 4:29
- Label: Run Records; CBC; Ariola
- Songwriters: Kevin Gillis, Jon Stroll, Steve Lunt
- Producers: Kevin Gillis, Jon Stroll

Lisa Lougheed singles chronology
"Run with Us" (1987)	"Ain't No Planes" (1988)

Music video
- "Run with Us" on YouTube

"Run with Us" is the end theme song for the 1980s television series The Raccoons. It was written by Kevin Gillis, Jon Stroll and Steve Lunt.

The song was originally recorded by Steve Lunt for the first season in 1985. The track was later covered by, and is more associated with, Lisa Lougheed. Lougheed included "Run With Us" on her first album Evergreen Nights; the track is also heard at the end of every Raccoons episode from the second season until the series ended in 1991. The song is featured in several episodes of the series.

The song was made available on streaming services in April 2026, through 604 Records, as part of the franchise's 40th anniversary, and the planned rollout of soundtrack reissues. A cover from Vancouver band Fionn was included as a bonus track on the digital reissue of Evergreen Nights, released on June 5 of the same year.

The Lougheed version of the song arrived on streaming services as the result of efforts by Rob Johnson, a London-based business-development manager who campaigns for the release of previously unavailable recordings. Since 2016, Johnson has helped secure digital releases of numerous previously unavailable singles, B-sides, remixes and bonus tracks by other artists.

== Notable uses ==
- The song was included in the closing credits of Canadian filmmaker Jason Eisener's film Hobo with a Shotgun.
