= Jacopo Camagni =

Italian comic book artist (1977–2026)

Jacopo Camagni (21 December 1977 – 1 March 2026) was an Italian illustrator and comic artist.

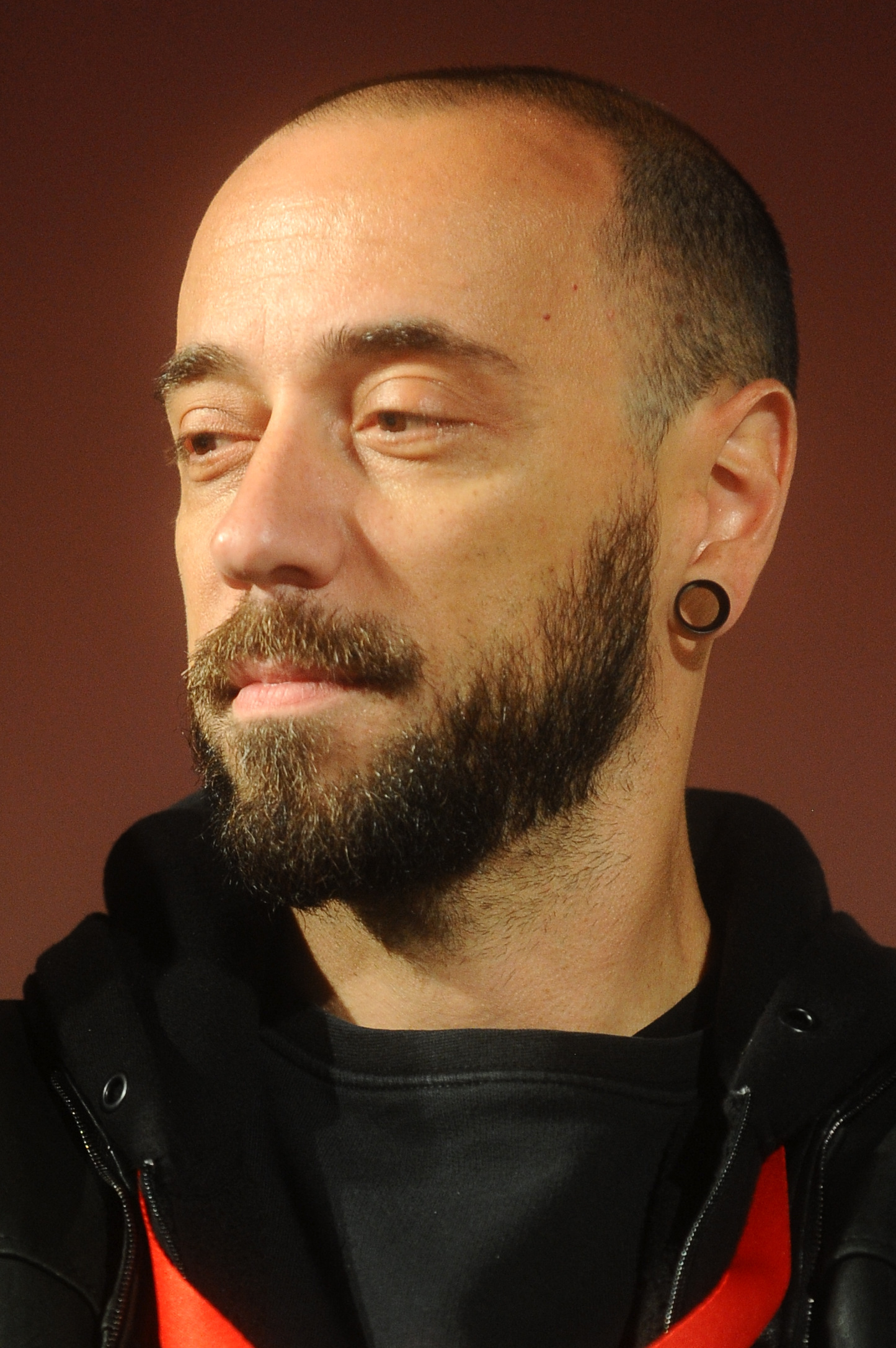
Camagni in 2018

== Early life and career ==
Jacopo Camagni was born in Bologna on 21 December 1977. He began working in the comic book industry in Italy in 1998, working as an artist for Lupin III Millennium, an official project of the Lupin the Third franchise, in collaboration with its creator, mangaka Monkey Punch.

Camagni broke into international comics after participating and winning in Marvel Comics' ChesterQuest, a talent search that took place at the 2008 New York Comic Con, under the supervision of editorial chief C. B. Cebulski. Following his victory, Camagni began working for Marvel in 2009. His work at Marvel includes the series Longshot Saves the Marvel Universe, Deadpool, Hawkeye, Generation X-23, and stories starring Star Wars character Kanan Jarrus.

In 2017, he began publishing the comic book series Nomen Omen, in collaboration with the Italian cartoonist Marco B. Bucci, and which was a success both commercially and in terms of audience in the European market, being later also published in the United States by Image Comics. The same year, Camagni and Bucci published a horror comic called Dylan Dog present Groucho, centered on Groucho Marx, brother of the philosopher Karl Marx, and released for the Italian market.

Following Camagni's death in March 2026, Generation X-23's writer Jody Houser stated that the series' second issue "is the last full issue drawn by Jacopo", adding that Camagni "did draw part of #3, and there will be a tribute page with some of his initial designs of the Generated".

== Personal life and death ==
Camagni was openly gay and was involved in the American LGBT comic book scene. In 2021, he participated in Marvel Comics' LGBT anthology, Marvel's Voices: Pride.

Camagni died on the morning of 1 March 2026, at the age of 48, following complications from heart surgery.
