= Lisa Lougheed =

Canadian actor and singer

- Born: Lisa Dawn Lougheed; September 9, 1968 (age 58); Etobicoke, Ontario, Canada
- Genre: Pop
- Occupations: Voice actress; dancer; singer; songwriter
- Instrument: Vocals
- Years active: 1987–1994; 1998
- Labels: Ariola; CBC; WMG

Lisa Dawn Lougheed (/ˈlaʊhiːd/; LOW-heed; born September 9, 1968) is a Canadian former singer, dancer, voice actress, and songwriter. She is likely best known for her role in the animated television series The Raccoons, where she performed for the soundtrack and voiced Lisa Raccoon.

== Early life ==
Lougheed was born to a father of Scottish and Irish descent, and a mother who is Black Nova Scotian with ties to North Preston and Guysborough. Lougheed's peers often mistook her mother for a maid.

Lougheed started tap dancing at three years old. She was a dance major at the Etobicoke School of the Arts as a teenager, where she learned ballet, modern dance, and highland dancing. While still in high-school, Lougheed spent three summers as a lead vocalist and dancer in musical revue style shows at Canada's Wonderland, where she sang such solo numbers as "Home" from The Wiz and "Le Jazz Hot!" from Victor/Victoria.

== Career ==
=== 1987-1989: The Raccoons and Evergreen Nights ===
While still a teenager, Lougheed received a job as a singer and voice actress for The Raccoons. She was hired when Kevin Gillis, the show's creator, was on a Canada-wide search for a new singer.

Evergreen Nights, Lougheed's debut album, consisted of songs from The Raccoons. It was released in Canada under CBC Records in late 1987 and released in Europe in mid-1988. Half of the songs were recorded while Lougheed had a cold. A limited number of copies were released at the time, but the album was reissued on vinyl in 2019 by Return To Analog Records. Lougheed did not know Evergreen Nights was going to be released as an album because she thought the songs were only being used for the show.

Lougheed was a cast member for Youth Beat, an anti-drug campaign by Bell Canada that performed in at least 20 Ontario cities during 1989. She joined after receiving a phone call from an estranged female friend with a cocaine addiction; Lougheed's friend was in the hospital, $10,000 in debt, and would commit crimes to fund her addiction. While touring with Youth Beat, Lougheed worked as a clothing store manager and sang commercial jingles. She was also working on a demo tape and trying to find a contract with a music company.

Lougheed performed in Japan as a backup vocalist for Sheree Jeacocke.

=== 1990-1992: World Love ===
Lougheed decided to name her second album World Love in August 1990, when the Gulf War had begun. She started recording in the summer of 1991 after signing a contract with Sony Music Canada and released World Love on March 3, 1992 with Warner Music Canada. It was Lougheed's first album to contain songs she co-wrote, which was nine out of the ten tracks.

World Love was intended to have an optimistic message and say "you have the power to make changes and to be nice to other people that you meet." The third track on her album, "Change Takes Time," was inspired by a newspaper story about a homeless man who risked his life to save a family from a burning building.

In May 1992, Lougheed was an opening act for En Vogue at the Kingswood Music Theatre; a performer at the Live Unity 92 concert in Toronto; and a participant in the Hospital for Sick Children telethon. She also performed for the Canada Day celebration at Ontario Place and the Niagara Falls' New Year's Eve show. The latter event was aired on CJOH-DT and hosted by Nerene Virgin, Ken Shaw, and Kathie Donovan. It also included Glass Tiger and Prescott-Brown.

"Love Vibe," the fourth song on Lougheed's World Love album, was briefly played on "Graduation Day," episode five in season three of Northwood.

=== 1993-1994: Peace + Harmony ===
Peace + Harmony, Lougheed's third album, was released in August 1993. It was recorded in Toronto, New York City, Chicago, and New Jersey. Lougheed collaborated with seven different writers and producers, including Mike "The Hitman" Wilson, David Morales, Christopher Max, Paul Scott, and Shank Thompson. Lougheed co-wrote 24 songs with twelve different writers in the span of two weeks, but the album only had ten tracks. Lougheed toured across Canada to promote her album, performing in the cities of Saskatoon, Calgary, Edmonton, Surrey, and Vancouver. Lougheed performed again at Niagara Falls' New Year's Eve show in 1993 with George Fox and Colin James.

In January 1994, Lougheed performed "Won't Give Up My Music" at AidScare, AidsCare; a CBC hosted event that was aimed at teenagers to raise awareness of AIDS and promote safe sex. Jonathan Torrens was the event's host. Additional show members were Sue Johanson, Suzie Landolphi, Snow, The Vacant Lot, and Corky and the Juice Pigs.

Lougheed was also a judge for the YTV Vocal Spotlight in April 1994. She performed at Niagara Falls' New Year's Eve show for the last time, this time alongside Blue Rodeo and Ashley MacIsaac. Ken Shaw returned as a host alongside Beverly Thomson and Howard Glassman.

In 1998, Lougheed sang back-up vocals on and appeared in the music video for Run On, a song performed by Oprah Winfrey. The track was used as the theme song for the 13th season of The Oprah Winfrey Show.

Her most recently credited vocal work was with Celine Dion and R. Kelly in November 1998; Lougheed is thought to have left the music industry after this collaboration. She presently resides in Chicago.

== Discography and filmography ==
=== Albums ===
Year	Title	Label	Format	Ref.
1987	Evergreen Nights	CBC Records; Return to Analog Records	Cassette; 12" vinyl	
1992	World Love	Warner Music Canada	Cassette; compact disc	
1993	Peace + Harmony	WEA records	Cassette; compact disc	

=== Credited songs ===
Year	Title	Additional artists	Ref.
1990	"Kickin' It (We Can Have a Good Time)" (Club Mix)	Def Klan	
1992	"Hold On"	Dream Warriors; Love and Sas; Raghib Ismail	
1992	"Running Out of Love"	Acosta-Russell	
1998	"I'm Your Angel"	Celine Dion; R. Kelly	

=== Singles and EPs ===
Year	Title	Label	Format
1986	"Where's the Party" (under the moniker La Donna)	Fun Fun Records	12" vinyl
1987	"Run with Us"/"Hold Back Tomorrow"	Run Records	7" vinyl
1988	"Ain't No Planes"/"Growing Up"	Run Records	7" vinyl
1992	"World Love"	Warner Music Inc.	Cassette; compact disc; 12" vinyl
1992	"Love Vibe"	Warner Music Inc.	Cassette; compact disc; 12" vinyl
1992	"Love You By Heart"	Warner Music Inc.	Cassette; compact disc; 12" vinyl
1993	"Won't Give Up My Music"	Warner Music Inc.	12" vinyl

=== Television appearances ===
Year	Title	Role	Ref.
1989–1991	The Raccoons	Lisa Raccoon, six episodes	
1991–1992	The Dini Petty Show	Herself, episodes 404 and 545	
1992	Rock 'N Talk	Herself, one episode	
1992	Electric Circus	Herself, one episode	
1994	Ear to the Ground	Herself, one episode	

== Charted songs ==
Chart	Song	Duration on chart	Peak position	Ref.
RPM Weekly's Top 30 Adult Contemporary Songs	"Run with Us"	November 7, 1987 - February 6, 1988	8	
RPM Weekly's 100 Singles	"Run with Us"	January 30, 1988 - April 9, 1988	69	
RPM Weekly's Top 30 Adult Contemporary Songs	"Ain't No Planes"	May 21, 1988 - June 18, 1988	26	
RPM Weekly's 100 Singles	"World Love"	March 21, 1992 - May 30, 1992	89	
RPM Weekly's Top 10 Dance Songs	"World Love"	March 14, 1992 - April 18, 1992	7	
RPM Weekly's 100 Singles	"Love Vibe"	July 11, 1992 - September 19, 1992	53	
MuchMusic's Top 30 Weekly Singles	"Love Vibe"	July 3, 1992 - September 4, 1992	10	
CJIB 94's Top 40 Countdown	"Love Vibe"	July 31, 1992 - August 21, 1992	31	
RPM Weekly's 100 Singles	"Love You by Heart"	October 3, 1992 - December 5, 1992	55	
CJIB 94's Top 20 Pop Songs	"Love You by Heart"	October 25, 1992 - November 29, 1992 December 13, 1992 - January 17, 1993	12	
MuchMusic's Top 30 Weekly Singles	"Won't Give Up My Music"	August 13, 1993 - October 29, 1993	10	
RPM Weekly's Top 30 Adult Contemporary Tracks	"Won't Give Up My Music"	July 24, 1993 - October 16, 1993	15	

== Nominations and awards ==
Year	Nominated	Award	Result	Ref.
1989	Lisa Lougheed	Juno Awards of 1989: Most Promising Female Vocalist	Nominated	
1992	David McNally for "Love Vibe"	MuchMusic Video Awards: Best Dance Video	Won	
1992	Barry Peterson for "Love Vibe"	MuchMusic Video Awards: Director of Photography	Nominated	
1992	Lisa Lougheed for "Love Vibe"	MuchMusic Video Awards: Best Video (Technical)	Nominated	
1992	"Love Vibe"	Canadian Music Video Awards: Best Dance Video	Won	
1993	"Love Vibe" (Club Remix); "World Love" (Lisa's Love House Mix)	Juno Awards of 1993: Best Dance Recording	Nominated	
1993	"Won't Give Up My Music"	MuchMusic Video Awards: Best Dance Video	Won	
1994	"Won't Give Up My Music"	Juno Awards of 1994: Best Dance Recording	Nominated	
