= New Found Glory discography =

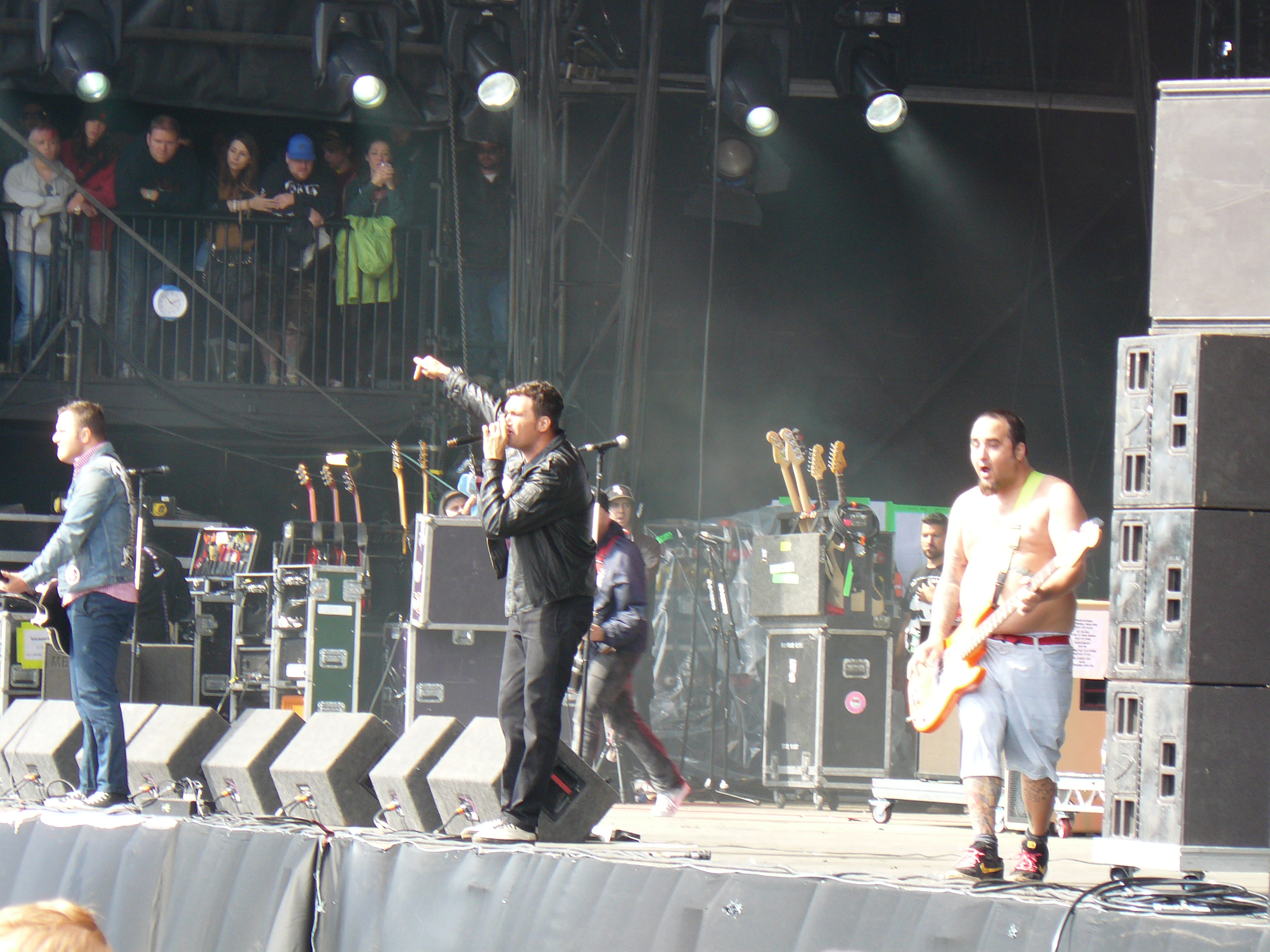
- New Found Glory live at Leeds Festival in 2011
- Studio albums: 11
- Extended plays: 3
- Live albums: 1
- Compilation albums: 2
- Tribute albums: 4
- Singles: 34
- Video albums: 2
- Music videos: 48
- Splits: 2

The discography of American rock band New Found Glory consists of eleven studio albums, 34 singles, three extended plays (EPs), four cover albums, one live album, and two greatest hits compilation albums.

== Albums ==
=== Studio albums ===
Year	Album details	Peak chart positions							Sales	Certifications (sales thresholds)
Year	Album details	US	US Ind.	US Heat.	AUS	FRA	IRL	UK	Sales	Certifications (sales thresholds)
1999	Nothing Gold Can Stay: Released: May 1, 1999; Label: Eulogy	—	—	—	—	—	—	—	US: 300,000	
2000	New Found Glory: Released: September 26, 2000; Label: Drive-Thru, MCA	107	—	1	—	—	—	136	US: 442,000	RIAA: Gold; BPI: Silver
2002	Sticks and Stones: Released: June 11, 2002; Label: Drive-Thru, MCA	4	—	—	33	100	61	10	US: 863,000	RIAA: Platinum; BPI: Silver; MC: Gold
2004	Catalyst: Released: May 18, 2004; Label: Drive-Thru, Geffen	3	—	—	32	154	—	27	US: 600,000	RIAA: Gold
2006	Coming Home: Released: September 19, 2006; Label: Drive-Thru, Suretone, Geffen	19	—	—	48	—	—	86	US: 145,000	
2007	From the Screen to Your Stereo Part II: Released: September 18, 2007; Label: Drive-Thru	42	4	—	—	—	—	193		
2009	Not Without a Fight: Released: March 10, 2009; Label: Epitaph	12	1	—	36	—	—	83		
2011	Radiosurgery: Released: October 4, 2011; Label: Epitaph	26	4	—	50	—	—	142		
2014	Resurrection: Released: October 7, 2014; Label: Hopeless	25	5	—	33	—	—	74		
2017	Makes Me Sick: Released: April 28, 2017; Label: Hopeless	40	1	—	36	—	—	55		
2020	Forever + Ever x Infinity: Released: June 19, 2020; Label: Hopeless	135	17	—	—	—	—	—		
2021	December's Here: Released: December 3, 2021; Label: Hopeless	— (Note: December's Here did not enter the US Billboard 200, but peaked at number 73 on the Top Current Album Sales chart.)	—	—	—	—	—	—		
2023	Make the Most of It: Released: January 20, 2023; Label: Revelation	— (Note: Make the Most of It did not enter the US Billboard 200, but peaked at number 70 on the Top Current Album Sales chart.)	—	—	—	—	—	—		
2026	Listen Up!: Released: February 20, 2026; Label: Pure Noise	— (Note: Listen Up! did not enter the US Billboard 200, but peaked at number 23 on the Top Album Sales chart.)	—	—	—	—	—	—		
"—" denotes releases that did not chart or were not released in that territory.

=== Live albums ===
Year	Album details	US
2013	Kill It Live: Released: October 8, 2013; Label: Bridge 9	133

=== Compilation albums ===
Year	Album details	US
2008	Hits: Released: March 18, 2008; Label: Geffen	167
2013	Icon: Released: March 19, 2013; Label: Geffen	—

=== Video albums ===
Year	Album details
2002	The Story So Far: Released: October 15, 2002; Label: Drive-Thru, MCA
2004	This Disaster: Live in London: Released: November 23, 2004; Label: Drive-Thru, Geffen

== EPs ==
Year	EP details	US
1997	It's All About the Girls: Released: December 20, 1997; Label: Fiddler	
2008	Tip of the Iceberg: Released: April 29, 2008; Label: Bridge 9	136
2012	A Very New Found Glory Christmas: Released: December 12, 2012	

=== Cover EPs ===
Year	Album details	Peak chart positions			
Year	Album details	US	US Ind.	US Heat.	UK
2000	From the Screen to Your Stereo: Released: March 28, 2000; Label: Drive-Thru	—	—	37	—
2013	Mania: Released: April 29, 2013; Label: Bridge 9, Sire	—	—	—	—
2019	From the Screen to Your Stereo 3: Released: May 3, 2019; Label: Hopeless	133	7	—	—
"—" denotes releases that did not chart or were not released in that territory.

=== Splits ===
Year	EP details
2009	Not Without a Heart Once Nourished by Sticks and Stones Within Blood Ill-Tempered Misanthropy Pure Gold Can Stay: Released: March 26, 2009; Label: Bridge 9
2010	Swiss Army Bro-Mance: Released: February 1, 2010; Label: Epitaph

== Singles ==
Year	Title	Peak chart positions					Certifications	Album
Year	Title	US	US Alt.	AUS	CAN	UK	Certifications	Album
2000	"Hit or Miss"	—	15	—	—	58		New Found Glory
2000	"Dressed to Kill"	—	—	—	—	—		New Found Glory
2002	"My Friends Over You"	85	5	—	11	30	RIAA: Gold; BPI: Silver	Sticks and Stones
2002	"Head on Collision"	—	28	83	24	64		Sticks and Stones
2004	"All Downhill from Here"	—	11	—	—	58		Catalyst
2004	"Truth of My Youth"	—	—	—	—	—		Catalyst
2004	"Failure's Not Flattering (What's Your Problem)"	—	—	—	—	67		Catalyst
2005	"I Don't Wanna Know"	—	—	—	—	48		Catalyst
2006	"It's Not Your Fault"	—	—	—	—	—		Coming Home
2007	"Kiss Me"	—	—	—	—	118		From the Screen to Your Stereo Part II
2008	"Dig My Own Grave"	—	—	—	—	—		Tip of the Iceberg
2008	"Listen to Your Friends"	—	—	—	—	—		Not Without a Fight
2009	"Don't Let Her Pull You Down"	—	—	—	—	—		Not Without a Fight
2010	"Truck Stop Blues"	—	—	—	—	—		Not Without a Fight
2011	"Radiosurgery"	—	—	—	—	—		Radiosurgery
2011	"Anthem for the Unwanted"	—	—	—	—	—		Radiosurgery
2012	"Summer Fling, Don't Mean a Thing"	—	—	—	—	—		Radiosurgery
2013	"Connect the Dots"	—	—	—	—	—		Kill It Live
2014	"Selfless"	—	—	—	—	—		Resurrection
2014	"Ready & Willing"	—	—	—	—	—		Resurrection
2014	"Stubborn"	—	—	—	—	—		Resurrection
2015	"One More Round"	—	—	—	—	—		Resurrection
2015	"Vicious Love" (featuring Hayley Williams)	—	—	—	—	—		Resurrection: Ascension
2015	"Snow"	—	—	—	—	—		non-album single
2017	"Happy Being Miserable"	—	—	—	—	—		Makes Me Sick
2017	"Party On Appocalypse"	—	—	—	—	—		Makes Me Sick
2017	"The Sound of Two Voices"	—	—	—	—	—		Makes Me Sick
2020	"Greatest of all Time"	—	—	—	—	—		Forever + Ever x Infinity
2020	"Stay Awhile"	—	—	—	—	—		Forever + Ever x Infinity
2020	"Scarier Than Jason Voorhees At A Campfire"	—	—	—	—	—		Forever + Ever x Infinity
2021	"The Last Red-Eye"	—	—	—	—	—		Forever And Ever x Infinity...And Beyond!!!
2021	"Backseat"	—	—	—	—	—		Forever And Ever x Infinity...And Beyond!!!
2021	"Somber Christmas"	—	—	—	—	—		December's Here
2022	"Dream Born Again"	—	—	—	—	—		Make the Most of It
2022	"Get Me Home"	—	—	—	—	—		Make the Most of It
"—" denotes releases that did not chart or were not released in that territory.

== Other appearances ==
Year	Song	Album
1998	"Passing Time"	Nothing Left #8 CD Sampler
2001	"Ex-Miss"	Kevin & Bean Present Swallow My Eggnog
2001	"Come Back Bon Jovi"	Welcome to the Family
2002	"The Minute I Met You"	Clockstoppers: Music from the Motion Picture
2008	"Tennessee"	Punk Goes Crunk
2013	"Nothing for Christmas"	Punk Goes Christmas
2024	"Part of Your World"	A Whole New Sound

== Music videos ==
Year	Song	Director(s)
1999	“Hit or Miss (Nothing Gold Can Stay Version)	Richard Reines
2000	"Hit or Miss (Waited Too Long)"	Smith n' Borin
2001	"Dressed to Kill"	Richard Reines
2002	"My Friends Over You"	The Malloys
2002	"Head on Collision"	The Malloys
2003	"Understatement"	Marc Steinberger / New Found Glory
2004	"All Downhill from Here"	Meiert Avis / No Brain
2004	"Failure's Not Flattering"	Meiert Avis
2004	"I Don't Wanna Know"	Liz Friedlander
2006	"It's Not Your Fault"	Brett Simon
2007	"Kiss Me"	Marco de la Torre
2008	"Dig My Own Grave"	Joseph Pattisall
2009	"Listen to Your Friends"	Meiert Avis
2009	"Don't Let Her Pull You Down"	Meiert Avis
2010	"Truck Stop Blues"	Matthew Stawski
2011	"Radiosurgery"	Matthew Stawski
2011	"Anthem for the Unwanted"	New Found Glory
2012	"Summer Fling, Don't Mean a Thing"	
2013	"Connect the Dots"	John Conway
2014	"Selfless"	John Conway
2014	"Ready and Willing"	John Conway
2014	"Snow"	
2014	"Stubborn"	
2015	"One More Round"	John Conway
2015	"Vicious Love" (featuring Hayley Williams)	Joseph Pattisall
2015	"Ready and Willing II"	
2017	"Happy Being Miserable"	Max Moore
2017	"Party on Apocalypse"	Max Moore
2017	"The Sound of Two Voices"	Max Moore
2017	"20 Years from Now"	Paris Visone
2018	"Call Me Anti-Social"	Max Moore
2018	"Heaven Sent"	Paris Visone
2018	"Barbed Wire"	Paris Visone
2019	"The Power of Love"	Natalie Simmons
2019	"This Is Me"	Natalie Simmons
2019	"Eye of the Tiger"	Natalie Simmons
2019	"Let It Go"	Natalie Simmons
2019	"Cups"	Natalie Simmons
2020	"Greatest of All Time"	Max Moore
2020	"Stay Awhile"	Max Moore
2020	"Scarier Than Jason Voorhees At A Campfire"	Acacia Evans
2021	"The Last Red-Eye"	Acacia Evans
2021	"Somber Christmas"	Natalie Simmons
2021	"Holiday Records"	Paris Visone
2022	"Dream Born Again"	
2022	"Get Me Home"	
2025	"Laugh It Off"	Hannah Gray Hall
2026	"A Love Song"	Savanah Moss
2026	"Good To Go"	Jordan Phoenix
