= Ian Grushka =

American musician (born 1977)

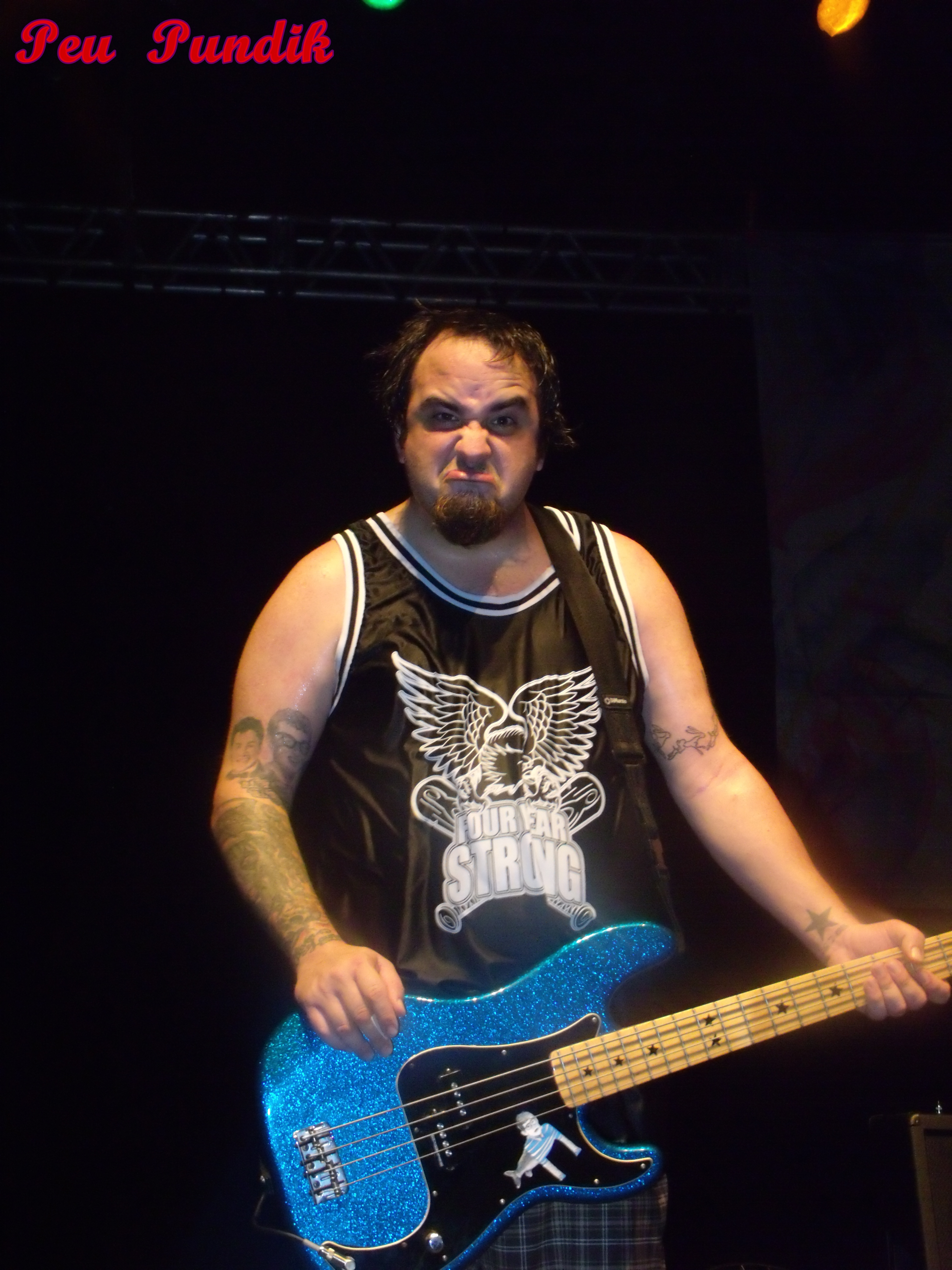

Background information
- Also known as: Sgt. Soy
- Born: September 4, 1977 (age 49)
- Origin: Smithtown, New York, U.S.
- Genres: Pop punk; alternative rock; melodic hardcore; hardcore punk
- Occupation: Musician
- Instrument: Bass guitar
- Years active: 1997–present
- Website: newfoundglory.com

Ian Ryan Grushka (born September 4, 1977) is an American musician. He is a founding member and the bassist of Florida rock band New Found Glory. He was also the bassist in the band's now defunct side-project, the International Superheroes of Hardcore, where he performed under the pseudonym of "Sgt. Soy".

== Biography ==
Ian Grushka was born in Smithtown, New York. As a child he played saxophone but gave it up after a year. Along with his parents and two brothers, he moved to Coral Springs, Florida, when he was 9 years old. He graduated from Marjory Stoneman Douglas High School in 1995, where he learned to play guitar and bass.

== Musical career ==
In 1997 Grushka played bass in the band "Inner City Kids" and later "Flip 60" with Jordan Pundik (vocals). After disbanding "Flip 60", they recruited Stephen Klein (guitar), whom Pundik met at Marjory Stoneman Douglas High School and had previously played with him in the band "Fallview". The threesome began to jam together. Practicing in Grushka's garage, they later invited Joe "Taco Joe" Marino to play drums. Shortly thereafter, Chad Gilbert (lead guitar), former vocalist of Shai Hulud, joined to complete the quintet. The band would become New Found Glory.

In addition to his work with New Found Glory, Grushka has worked with a number of artists. He plays bass on the track "Cobwebs" on DBY's 2004 album Make It Bleed. He also plays bass on the track "Boy Without Batteries" on Man Overboard 2013 album, Heart Attack. Grushka plays bass on the tracks "Cry Me a River", "Stay with Me Tonight", and "Johnny" on the 2013 release Andy Jackson And The Mary Tyler Mormons by Andy Jackson And The Mary Tyler Mormons.

Grushka has also lent his vocals to several albums. He provides backup vocals on the tracks "Drinking Song" and "Thank You" from the 1998 Anchorman album, Still Need You More Than Air. He also sings backup on "Miserable" and "Up 'Til Now" on the 2007 release Nervous Breakthrough by the band Lefty.

In 2004, Grushka and Gilbert started the record label Broken Sounds, which signed Breakdance Vietnam, Eagleslayer, Suffocate Faster, and Slowdance.

== Acting career ==
Along with the rest of New Found Glory, Grushka appears in the 2004 movie Tales from the Crapper. He also makes a cameo appearance in the Good Charlotte video for "Festival Song" and the Less Than Jake video for "My Money Is On The Longshot".

== Equipment ==
- Fender P-Bass with Seymour Duncan 1/4 lb. Bassline Pickups
- Mesa Boogie 8x10 Cabinet
- Ampeg SVT Classic Heads
- Sans Amp DI
- Ernie Ball Strings
- Intune Guitar Picks
- Dimarzio Cliplock Straps

== Discography ==
with New Found Glory

- 1997: It's All About the Girls (EP)
- 1999: Nothing Gold Can Stay
- 2000: From the Screen to Your Stereo (EP)
- 2000: New Found Glory
- 2002: Sticks and Stones
- 2004: Catalyst
- 2006: Coming Home
- 2007: From the Screen to Your Stereo Part II
- 2008: Hits
- 2008: Tip of the Iceberg (EP)
- 2009: Not Without a Fight
- 2011: Radiosurgery
- 2012: A Very New Found Glory Christmas
- 2013: Mania (EP)
- 2013: Kill It Live
- 2014: Resurrection
- 2017: Makes Me Sick
- 2019: From the Screen to Your Stereo 3
- 2020: Forever + Ever X Infinity
- 2021: December's Here
- 2023: Make The Most Of It
- 2026: Listen Up!

with International Superheroes of Hardcore

- 2006: International Superheroes of Hardcore
- 2008: Takin' It Ova!
- 2008: HPxHC (EP)

== Record labels ==
with New Found Glory

- Fiddler Records (1997)
- Eulogy Records (1999)
- Drive-Thru Records/Geffen Records (2000 – 2007)
- Bridge 9 Records (2008 – 2009)
- Epitaph Records (2009 – 2014)
- Hopeless Records (2014 – present)
