= Mania (EP) =

EP by New Found Glory
- Released: April 29, 2013
- Recorded: 2013
- Genre: Punk rock
- Length: 14:13
- Label: Bridge 9; Sire

New Found Glory chronology
A Very New Found Glory Christmas (2011)	Mania (2013)	Kill It Live (2013)

Mania is an EP of song covers by American rock band New Found Glory, released on April 29, 2013 on vinyl for Record Store Day. The EP consists of 6 covers originally performed by The Ramones. It was released digitally one week after RSD.

This EP is the last New Found Glory record to feature guitarist Steve Klein, who parted ways with the band in December 2013.

== Track listing ==
No.	Title	Length
1.	"I Wanna Be Sedated"	2:28
2.	"Rockaway Beach"	2:04
3.	"Rock 'n' Roll High School"	2:18
4.	"Do You Remember Rock 'N' Roll Radio?"	3:23
5.	"Judy Is A Punk"	1:31
6.	"The KKK Took My Baby Away"	2:29

== Personnel ==
New Found Glory

- Jordan Pundik – lead vocals
- Chad Gilbert – lead guitar, backing vocals
- Steve Klein – rhythm guitar
- Ian Grushka – bass
- Cyrus Bolooki – drums, percussion
