= December's Here =

Studio album by New Found Glory
- Released: December 3, 2021
- Genres: Christmas; pop-punk
- Length: 33:33
- Label: Hopeless
- Producers: Chad Gilbert; Will Pugh

New Found Glory chronology
Forever + Ever x Infinity (2020)	December's Here (2021)	Make The Most Of It (2023)

Singles from December's Here
- 1. "Somber Christmas" Released: November 3, 2021; 2. "Holiday Records" Released: November 18, 2021

December's Here is a Christmas album by American rock band New Found Glory, released on December 3, 2021. It is their last release through Hopeless Records.

== Track listing ==
All tracks are written by New Found Glory.

December's Here
No.	Title	Length
1.	"December's Here"	2:59
2.	"Somber Christmas"	3:04
3.	"Holiday Records"	3:03
4.	"Nothing For Christmas"	3:36
5.	"Christmas Card"	2:07
6.	"Santa Forgive Me"	3:19
7.	"Our First Christmas"	2:41
8.	"Snow"	3:47
9.	"Don't Fight It's Christmas"	2:18
10.	"It Never Snows In Florida (Holiday Version)"	3:20
11.	"For Christmas Sake"	3:18
Total length:		33:33

== Personnel ==
=== New Found Glory ===
- Jordan Pundik – vocals
- Cyrus Bolooki – drums, choir vocals
- Ian Grushka – bass, choir vocals
- Chad Gilbert – guitar, choir vocals

=== Additional performers ===
- Anthony Raneri – choir vocals
- Christina Cimorelli – choir vocals
- Katherine Cimorelli – choir vocals
- Lisa Cimorelli – pianos, choir vocals
- Amy Cimorelli – choir vocals
- Lauren Cimorelli – choir vocals

=== Technical personnel ===
- Chad Gilert – producer
- Will Pugh – producer, engineer
- New Found Glory – executive producers
- Alex Prieto – mixing
- Brenden Collins – mixing assistant
- Mike Kalajian – mastering
- Eric Tobin – A&R
- Jordan Kalalka – artwork

== Charts ==
Chart (2021)	Peak position
US Top Current Album Sales (Billboard)	73
