= Not Without a Fight =

2009 studio album by New Found Glory

Studio album by New Found Glory
- Released: March 10, 2009
- Recorded: May–July 2008
- Studios: OPRA Music, Los Angeles
- Genre: Pop-punk
- Length: 36:15
- Label: Epitaph
- Producer: Mark Hoppus

New Found Glory chronology
Tip of the Iceberg (2008)	Not Without a Fight (2009)	Swiss Army Bro-Mance (2010)

Singles from Not Without a Fight
- 1. "Listen to Your Friends" Released: December 23, 2008; 2. "Don't Let Her Pull You Down" Released: October 20, 2009; 3. "Truck Stop Blues" Released: July 21, 2010

Not Without a Fight is the sixth studio album by American rock band New Found Glory. It was released on March 10, 2009, through independent label Epitaph Records. Produced by Blink-182 singer-bassist Mark Hoppus and recorded at his home based-OPRA Studios, the album was seen as a return to the band's energetic roots in comparison to its predecessor; the mellow Coming Home (2006). The gap between releases marked the longest period between studio albums in the band's career thus far, while the title is taken from the lyrics in opening track, "Right Where We Left Off".

In the United States, opening week sales reached 26,900 units allowing it to debut at number one on the Billboard Independent Albums Chart and number twelve on the Billboard 200. This marked their fourth consecutive album to debut in the top twenty on the Billboard chart, despite leaking six weeks prior to its official release. The album was released early in Australia to coincide with the band's appearance at the Soundwave Festival and it debuted at number thirty six on the ARIA Charts.

== Background ==
Following the release, promotion and touring of Coming Home (2006), the band parted ways with major label Geffen Records in early 2007. Steve Klein, the band's chief lyricist and rhythm guitarist explained that due to the label undergoing several management changes, the band were left feeling isolated; "At the time of Coming Home being released, this guy who was the president was all about Pussycat Dolls and all that pop and R&B. It came out at a time when they weren't really caring about their rock bands. And you know, we had a choice to be on that label again for the next one and we just decided that we didn't want to be part of a label that didn't want to put out rock music." The band subsequently recorded their second cover album, From the Screen to Your Stereo Part II (2007) without a record contract, before agreeing a distribution deal with former label Drive-Thru Records. After writing and recording several demos in the interim period, lead guitarist and composer Chad Gilbert contacted Mark Hoppus early in 2008 to discuss a possible project. When they met, Gilbert showed Hoppus the series of rough demos from his iPod and it was then agreed to record an album in Hoppus' home studio, despite the band not being signed to a label at the time.

== Recording and production ==
"The record is definitely energetic. These are straight-up rock songs. There's no bullshit or crazy effects."

— Chad Gilbert on Not Without a Fight

The band entered the studio in the latter part of May 2008, and completed recording in July. Hoppus later stated that he was willing to take part in the project as he would be working with a band with a "definite sound" in mind, but who "also wanted input and guidance from someone they trusted." The producer also commented afterward that, "We worked really hard to get great, gritty guitars, big drums, edgy bass, and Jordan is singing stronger than he ever has. The songs really came together, and I can't wait for people to hear this record." Speaking of the recording sessions, Steve Klein praised the "lighthearted" atmosphere amongst Hoppus and the band; "He didn't take himself too seriously and we don't take ourselves too seriously, either. Every day, you'd wake up and go, "Man, I can't wait to get to the studio." Frontman Jordan Pundik also praised Hoppus. He commented in Alternative Press magazine, "He had a lot of really cool ideas as far as bass lines and bass tones and things like that, and he also came up with some really cool harmonies for vocals. But he wasn't really there to tell us what to do. It was more like a collaborative. It was nice to have him there because he's not just a producer. He was in a band that kind of set the tone for bands like New Found Glory and a lot of the newer bands." Gilbert meanwhile, spoke of the band's desire to concentrate solely on their music; "Lately in music, especially in our scene, I feel like there has been a lot of emphasis on the look, and I feel now there is a lot less emphasis on the song and a lot more on the album packaging or the color of the shirts the band is wearing and the style of their hair. I just hope people get this record and say 'Wow, this is a straightforward album with pure emotion and pure adrenaline' and it's a record with five guys, who look like guys".

== Composition ==
The album's overall sound was seen as a "return to form", going back to the band's faster and energetic roots. This was mainly because previous album, Coming Home, was viewed as a more mellow, mid-tempo and sentimental record. Fans made comparisons with the band's eponymous second album, while critics often noted a growing maturity. Mike Demante of the Houston Chronicle reported that, "Not Without a Fight is full of those catchy choruses and gang vocals that fans have come to love. The album is a return to form, whilst still incorporating the indie-rock of its Geffen records' swan song, Coming Home, and last year's melodic hardcore EP Tip of the Iceberg." Brendan Manley of Alternative Press said that, "opening track, "Right Where We Left Off," builds upon a chunky guitar riff that recalls classic NFG, yet surprises with smart, subtle rhythmic twists. NFG's true maturity though, shines in the album's skillful composition that offers up instant classics like "Heartless At Best"." The A.V. Club critic Aaron Burgess was in agreeance; "Maturity remains a guiding principle on Not Without A Fight—the band strikes a keen balance between hard-hitting, soft-hearted, youthfully exuberant, and all grown up." Kelly Knickerbocker of the Dallas Observer also noted, "Heartbreak bodes well for creative processes, it seems. Not Without A Fight is full of performances by pissed-off dudes who are taking it back to their roots: raw punk-pop, with crafty and sometimes cynical lyrics."

The metaphor for the album title was described by Gilbert as "our personal war and the wars that you have in relationships with your loved ones. When you want something bad enough in life you have to fight for it. That's like with our band. We love being in this band, and we'll do whatever it takes to continue." Drummer Cyrus Bolooki further explained, "I think it just kind of goes in with the whole idea that we've been around for a while, and we really feel like a resurgence for us that after eleven years now we're still relevant. We're on tours with bands like Four Year Strong, A Day To Remember and you know, a lot of these bands maybe first got into bands like us, so it's almost like another generation." Musically, Gilbert explained that unlike the harmony-driven Coming Home, the band wanted to return to a more energetic style both because of the embittered lyrics and the need to translate songs live. "We love [the songs off] Coming Home, but live we couldn't really rock out to them. And that's what we love. So I think naturally I was wanting rhythms that I knew I'd have fun playing live." He supported this by explaining the band's desire to alternate between albums; "Every album New Found Glory's released is different in its own way, and we'll continue to work that way. When we write albums, whatever comes out, comes out. We're always real, and I think that's why we still have the fans we do." Much of the lyrical themes also come in contrast to Coming Home, largely due to divorces that Pundik and Gilbert went through since writing the previous album, as well as their departure from Geffen Records. Most topics deal with reflection and bitterness towards the former relationships. Gilbert found the best way to express these emotions was to revisit the fast-paced style of the band's earlier days. "The truth of the matter is that when we did Coming Home we were all in love. I was engaged, Jordan was engaged, But since that time my relationship failed, Jordan's relationship failed and going into this record we had a lot of angst. We didn't aim to make a faster, more energetic record. That's just what really came out because of our natural emotion."

== Release and promotion ==
Klein, Pundik and Gilbert perform during the 2009 Not Without a Fight Tour at the Wolverhampton Civic Hall

Upon completion of the album, the band were in a position to present songs to various record labels. Bad Religion guitarist Brett Gurewitz, already a keen admirer of the band, signed them to his long running independent label Epitaph Records in September 2008, with a view to release the album in February 2009. In September and October 2008, New Found Glory went on a US tour, dubbed the Easycore Tour, with International Superheroes of Hardcore, A Day to Remember, Four Year Strong and Crime in Stereo. On October 13, 2008, Bolooki revealed that the album would be titled Not Without a Fight. He said it "kind of goes in with the whole idea that we've been around for a while and we really feel like a resurgence for us that after eleven years now we're still relevant." In November 2008, they went on a UK tour with Set Your Goals and Four Year Strong. The first single from the album was "Listen to Your Friends", and was released through iTunes on December 23. On January 6, 2009, the album's artwork and track listing were posted online. "Listen to Your Friends" was released to radio on January 27, 2009. Over a month before its official release, the album leaked online. In response to this, guitarist Chad Gilbert stated although he was disappointed, he was happy for his band's music to be heard by any means: "As far as the leaking thing. If my favorite bands CD came out early online I would download it too. I will still buy it though because when I love a band I've got to have the album packaging and artwork. The whole building up to release date loses a bit of its excitement but to be honest, the fans that would go out of their way to download it are the true fans that go out of their way to buy merch and are the ones that will know the words first and sing every song at the show." In February and March, the band toured Australia as part of the Soundwave festival.

Not Without a Fight was made available for streaming through the band's Myspace profile on March 3, 2009, before being released through Epitaph Records on March 10, 2009. The vinyl edition of the album was released through independent label Bridge Nine Records. The Japanese edition of the album included "I'm the Fool" as a bonus track. A music video for "Listen to Your Friends" premiered on the same day. Between late March and early May, the band went on headlining tour of the US with support from Set Your Goals, Bayside and Shai Hulud. Verse were originally supposed to support New Found Glory, however, they unexpectedly broke up, resulting in Shai Hulud taking their place. On April 18, Shai Hulud left the tour and were replaced by Fireworks. New Found Glory appeared at The Bamboozle festival in early May. During the summer, the band made appearances for major festivals at the Rock AM Ring in Germany and Reading and Leeds in England. Soon afterwards, Bolooki confirmed they had finished shooting the video for second single "Don't Let Her Pull You Down". The video premiered on October 15, and was released on October 20 on 7-inch vinyl. In October and November 2009, the band embarked on a headlining US tour; they were due to end the year supporting Dashboard Confessional, but that act cancelled their tour citing family issues. An acoustic tour was instead scheduled with Dashboard Confessional, running through December 2009.

Touring continued well into 2010, with the band headlining the Slam Dunk Festival along with Alkaline Trio and Capdown. Later in June, it was announced the band were shooting the video for "Truck Stop Blues", acting as promotion for the band's appearance on the Honda Civic Tour between July and September 2010. The video was later released via the band's Twitter and Facebook pages on 21 July. In between dates of the Honda Civic Tour, the band played headlining shows in smaller venues alongside Lemuria and the Wonder Years.

== Critical reception ==
Professional ratings
Aggregate scores
Source	Rating
Metacritic	61/100
Review scores
Source	Rating
AbsolutePunk	8.6/10
AllMusic	3.5/5 stars
Alternative Press	3.5/5 stars
IGN	6.5/10
Los Angeles Times	2.5/4 stars
Melodic	4/5 stars
Q	3/5 stars
Rock Sound	9/10
The A.V. Club	B
Ultimate Guitar	8.3/10

Not Without a Fight garnered mostly positive reviews from music critics. On Metacritic, the album holds a score of 61 out of 100 based on reviews from eleven critics, which indicates "generally favorable reviews". Joe DeAndrea, staff reviewer for AbsolutePunk, awarded a score of 86%. He said of the band that, "on Not Without a Fight, it's clear that New Found Glory still haven't lost their knack of creating an album with sing-a-long choruses and memorable guitar riffs that fans will love." He described the songs as "energy filled" and noted the album was "another breath of fresh air within a genre saturated with vocoder and neon. Andrew Leahey, in his review for Allmusic, awarded the album 3½ stars out of five. He praised the "mature performance" of frontman Jordan Pundik; "Unlike his younger pop-punk contemporaries, though, Pundik no longer seems smitten with the idea of a happy relationship. There are precious few traces of the urgent, here's-to-the-night ethos that other groups champion so heartily. Taken as a whole, Not Without a Fight is a pleasant listen, mature in its outlook, and happily adolescent in its vigor".

Alternative Press journalist Brendan Manley also awarded a score of 3½ stars out of five and claimed, "throughout Fight, it's the guitars, fueled by drummer Cyrus Bolooki's frenetic tempos, that exude the greatest return to form. From "47," with its near-speed-metal breakdown to the raucous "I'll Never Love Again" to the fluid, Tom DeLonge-esque guitar lines in "Truck Stop Blues," it becomes abundantly clear that guitarists Chad Gilbert and Steve Klein have rediscovered their mojo and have come to rock." Despite stating that the album lacked consistency in the latter half, he summarised that, "the record is a reminder of why we fell in love with NFG in the first place and for many of us, that's enough." Billboard magazine were also favourable, stating, "With Blink-182/+44 bassist Mark Hoppus producing, Fight does pack a wallop, enveloping frontman Jordan Pundik's angsty relationship paeans on a dozen compact, dynamic and hooky tracks in a mere 35 minutes". Alex Hofford of North Carolina State University-based newspaper, the Technician, awarded the album 4½ stars out of five in his review. He called the album a "paradigm of the pop-punk craze from earlier in the decade", while noting, "New Found Glory has successfully combined the sounds from their previous ventures into one sonically cohesive album. Even when the band wants to slow down the pace with more melodic songs like "Reasons" and "Heartless At Best," they don't ruin the flow of the album. This is one "fight" you shouldn't miss." Q magazine writer Dave Everley awarded the album a "good" three out of five stars, opining that, "New Found Glory's newfound maturity makes for a palatable record that will soothe lovelorn rockers. It may not be their defining release, but its a reminder as to why the fivesome have garnered such a devout following."

Rock Sound magazine were highly impressed and gave a score of nine out of ten, lauding the album as the band's best work to date. Andrew Kelham opined that, "each song is a thick cut of pop punk played to perfection by a group of musicians who have taken a genre by the throat and defined it with their sound". The A.V. Club critic Aaron Burgess awarded the album a "B" grade and remarked; "the loud-guitar and crunching-rhythm style that drives the album, demonstrates that, softening middle years be damned, New Found Glory still hits hard enough to matter". Adam Webb, staff writer for Ultimate-Guitar was also largely favourable in his review, awarding a score of 8.3/10. He commented that the band had, "created a rockin' pop punk album that shows just why they stand so tall above the crowd of uneventful scenesters that is the tragedy of the music scene today". Hailing the band as the "undisputed kings of pop punk", he finalised his review by adding, "You'd be clinically insane not to give this album a go. Either that or you're blind, deaf and dumb. In which case you have a valid reason and a much bigger problem at hand". However, other reviews were less receptive. Tom Bryant of British magazine Kerrang! was critical of the album's sound asking "whether this is a sound of a brand trying to recapture the past; a band having a midlife crisis." In his review for Rocklouder!, critic John Webber noted that "By no means is this a bad record; in fact it easily lays waste to most releases in the same vain this side of Coming Home, but when held up against such a stunning back catalogue, it is certainly not an essential purchase for any new fans." PopMatters echoed this sentiment by writing, "It doesn't mean they've made a bad album here, just a predictable one. Attempting a traditionalist record in any genre is a game of constraints, and those constraints are fully felt on Not Without a Fight."

=== Accolades ===
Publication	Country	Accolade	Year	Rank
AbsolutePunk	United States	Top 30 Albums of the Year	2009	29

=== Legacy ===
As part of their "20 Years of Pop Punk" Tour, the band played the album in full in rotation with other releases from their catalog in 2017.

In 2016, Chad Gilbert, while ranking his favorite of his own albums with New Found Glory ranked Not Without a Fight in last place stating

"I think I tried the least on that one. It came after the Coming Home record, which we put a lot into song writing and lyric wise, and there’s a lot of emotion in that record. But when Coming Home first came out it wasn’t that well received, so when we went back into the recording studio for Not Without a Fight I was like, ‘Screw it! I’m just gonna write and record punk songs, and that’s it.’ So I don't think I pushed myself enough, and musically it was the quickest and easiest album I think we’ve ever done. It was also the one I was the least emotionally attached to,"

== Track listing ==
All songs written and composed by New Found Glory.

No.	Title	Length
1.	"Right Where We Left Off"	3:05
2.	"Don't Let Her Pull You Down"	3:28
3.	"Listen to Your Friends"	3:20
4.	"47"	2:52
5.	"Truck Stop Blues"	2:15
6.	"Tangled Up" (featuring Hayley Williams)	3:13
7.	"I'll Never Love Again"	2:38
8.	"Reasons"	2:59
9.	"Such a Mess"	2:42
10.	"Heartless at Best"	3:44
11.	"This Isn't You"	2:49
12.	"Don't Let This Be the End"	3:02
Total length:		36:15

Japanese/iTunes edition
No.	Title	Length
13.	"I'm the Fool"	3:38

== Personnel ==
Adapted from AllMusic.

New Found Glory

- Jordan Pundik – lead vocals
- Chad Gilbert – lead guitar, backing vocals
- Steve Klein – rhythm guitar, lyrics
- Ian Grushka – bass
- Cyrus Bolooki – drums, percussion

Production

- Mark Hoppus – producer
- Chris Holmes – engineering
- Neal Avron – mixing
- Ted Jensen – mastering
- Ryan Russell – photography
- Sons of Nero – art direction, design

== Chart positions ==
Chart	Peak position
Australia Albums Chart (ARIA)	36
Japanese Top Album Sales (Billboard Japan)	23
U.K Albums Chart (The Official Charts Company)	83
U.S Billboard 200	12
U.S Independent Albums (Billboard )	1
U.S Alternative Albums (Billboard)	5
U.S Rock Albums (Billboard)	5
U.S Tastemaker Albums (Billboard)	11

== Release history ==
Country	Date	Label	Format	Catalogue #	Ref.
Australia	February 21, 2009	Shock Records	Digipak, digital download	70082	
Japan	March 4, 2009	Epic Records	Compact Disc	EICP-1114	
Europe	March 9, 2009	Epitaph Records	Digipak, Digital Download	87008	
United States	March 10, 2009	Epitaph Records	Digipak, Digital Download	87008	
United States	March 10, 2009	Bridge Nine Records	12-inch Vinyl	202081	
