= From the Screen to Your Stereo 3 =

2019 cover album by New Found Glory

EP by New Found Glory
- Released: May 3, 2019
- Recorded: Pentavarit Studios (Nashville, Tennessee, U.S.); Early 2019
- Genre: Pop-punk
- Length: 22:30
- Label: Hopeless
- Producers: Will Pugh; New Found Glory

New Found Glory chronology
Makes Me Sick (2017)	From the Screen to Your Stereo 3 (2019)	Forever + Ever x Infinity (2020)

From the Screen to Your Stereo 3 is a cover album by American band New Found Glory, and is the follow-up to the 2000 EP From the Screen to Your Stereo and the 2007 album From the Screen to Your Stereo Part II. All the tracks are covers of songs from motion picture soundtracks.

== Track listing ==
From the Screen to Your Stereo 3
No.	Title	Original Motion Picture	Length
1.	"Cups" (Anna Kendrick)	Pitch Perfect	1:51
2.	"This Is Me" (Keala Settle)	The Greatest Showman	3:28
3.	"The Power of Love" (Huey Lewis and the News)	Back to the Future	3:29
4.	"Let It Go" (Idina Menzel)	Frozen	3:17
5.	"Accidentally in Love" (Counting Crows)	Shrek 2	2:59
6.	"A Thousand Years" (Christina Perri)	The Twilight Saga: Breaking Dawn – Part 1	4:01
7.	"Eye of the Tiger" (Survivor)	Rocky	3:25
Total length:			22:30

== Credits ==
New Found Glory

- Jordan Pundik - vocals
- Ian Grushka - bass, backing vocals
- Chad Gilbert - guitar, backing vocals
- Cyrus Bolooki - drums

Production

- Will Pugh - producer, engineer
- New Found Glory - producers
- Steve Evetts - mixing
- Troy Glessner - mastering

Art

- David Bean - photography
- Caleb Morris - artwork

== Charts ==
Chart (2019)	Peak position
UK Album Sales (OCC)	76
UK Album Downloads (Official Charts)	27
UK Independent Albums (Official Charts)	31
UK Rock & Metal Albums (Official Charts)	6
US Billboard 200	133
US Independent Albums (Billboard)	7
US Top Album Sales (Billboard)	16
US Top Alternative Albums (Billboard)	12
US Top Rock Albums (Billboard)	23
