= Make the Most of It =

Make The Most Of It

Studio album by New Found Glory
- Released: January 20, 2023
- Recorded: 2022
- Venues: Liberty Hall, Franklin, TN
- Studio: The Castle Studios
- Genres: Acoustic; pop-punk
- Length: 56:46
- Label: Revelation
- Producer: New Found Glory

New Found Glory chronology
December's Here (2021)	Make The Most Of It (2023)	Listen Up! (2026)

Singles from Make the Most of It
- 1. "Dream Born Again" Released: November 10, 2022; 2. "Get Me Home" Released: December 16, 2022; 3. "The Story So Far" Released: January 19, 2023

Make The Most Of It is the eleventh studio album by the American rock band New Found Glory, released on January 20, 2023; their only album through Revelation Records. The album was announced on November 10, 2022, with the lead single, "Dream Born Again", released that same day. The album includes seven new original tracks, and seven live re-recordings of fan favorites, all performed acoustically.

== Background ==
Make The Most Of It came in the wake of guitarist Chad Gilbert's cancer diagnosis in 2021, where he was found unresponsive in bed, and doctors subsequently found a sizeable tumor due to pheochromocytoma.

A percentage of proceeds from the album went towards The Pheo Para Alliance, an organization advocating the awareness of pheochromocytoma.

== Track listing ==
All tracks are written by New Found Glory.

Make The Most Of It
No.	Title	Length
1.	"Dream Born Again"	4:21
2.	"Mouth to Mouth"	4:12
3.	"Get Me Home"	3:30
4.	"Watch the Lilies Grow"	4:33
5.	"More Than Enough"	3:42
6.	"Kiss the Floor"	5:07
7.	"Bloom"	3:34

Live bonus tracks
No.	Title	Length
8.	"Understatement"	4:19
9.	"All Downhill from Here"	3:46
10.	"Dressed to Kill"	3:37
11.	"The Story So Far"	3:56
12.	"Failure's Not Flattering"	3:56
13.	"My Friends Over You"	3:53
14.	"Hit or Miss"	4:14

== Personnel ==
=== New Found Glory ===
- Jordan Pundik – vocals
- Cyrus Bolooki – drums, acoustic guitar
- Ian Grushka – bass
- Chad Gilbert – guitars, backing vocals

=== Additional performers ===
- Jenna Thompson – viola (4)
- Lisa Cimorelli – piano (1, 6)

=== Technical personnel ===
- New Found Glory – producers
- Mark Trombino – mixing (1-7)
- Cyrus Bolooki – engineering (1-7), mixing (8-14)
- Troy Glessner – mastering
- Stevie Lowenstein – photographs
- Nick Dominguez – layout
- Ian Grushka – paintings

== Charts ==
Chart (2023)	Peak position
US Top Current Album Sales (Billboard)	70
