= Listen Up! (New Found Glory album) =

Studio album by New Found Glory
- Released: February 20, 2026
- Recorded: The Castle Recording Studios, Franklin, Tennessee
- Length: 36:03
- Label: Pure Noise
- Producer: Steve Evetts

New Found Glory chronology
Make The Most Of It (2023)	Listen Up! (2026)

Singles from Listen Up!
- 1. "100%" Released: April 30, 2025; 2. "Laugh It Off" Released: September 30, 2025; 3. "Treat Yourself" Released: November 4, 2025; 4. "Beer and Blood Stains" Released: January 14, 2026

Listen Up! is the twelfth studio album by the American rock band New Found Glory, released on February 20, 2026, on Pure Noise Records. Produced by Steve Evetts, who had worked with the band on Forever + Ever x Infinity (2020), and mixed by the band's longtime studio collaborator Neal Avron, the album was preceded by the singles, "100%", "Laugh It Off", "Treat Yourself" and "Beer and Blood Stains". It is the band's final studio album to feature founding lead guitarist Chad Gilbert, who passed away seven months after its release.

The album was recorded at The Castle Recording Studios in Franklin, Tennessee amidst a time of personal struggle for the band, with Gilbert battling metastatic pheochromocytoma, a rare form of gland cancer, during the writing and recording process.

Released to mostly positive reviews, the album debuted at number twenty-three on the Billboard Top Album Sales Chart in the US, number thirty-five on UK Album Sales chart, number three on the UK Rock & Metal Albums Chart, and number forty-three on the Scottish Albums Chart.

== Background and recording ==
In 2021, one year after the release of Forever + Ever x Infinity (2020), guitarist Chad Gilbert was diagnosed with metastatic pheochromocytoma, a rare form of gland cancer. Frontman Jordan Pundik reflected: "It was a gut punch when we found out everything… to see my friend, my brother, going through that." As a result, Gilbert was no longer able to tour with the band, with guitarists Dan O'Connor, Kevin Skaff, Zach Comtois and Dave Knox filling-in for him on the road. Following Gilbert's diagnosis, the core four-piece wrote and recorded an acoustic mini-album, Make The Most Of It, which was released in January 2023.

With the other members of New Found Glory on tour, Gilbert began working on material for a new studio album at his home in Franklin, Tennessee: "I got to play a couple of shows that were close by. But, you know, Brian Wilson from The Beach Boys was schizophrenic, so when they were in Japan on tour, he was at home making Pet Sounds". Between tours, bass guitarist Ian Grushka and drummer Cyrus Bolooki stayed with Gilbert to work on the new material together.

During the recording process of Listen Up!, Gilbert recorded his guitar parts while going through chemotherapy. Touring rhythm guitarist Dan O'Connor assisted in the studio, with Gilbert noting: "When I needed to double a guitar track and take a rest, he could help out with that. Without Dan, I don’t know if the album would have been finished – I did not expect to be so close to death while making it."

== Writing and composition ==
The album's lyrics were written as a collaboration between frontman Jordan Pundik and guitarist Chad Gilbert, which many of Gilbert's lyrics being influenced by his ongoing battles with cancer: "I’m going through a nightmare. But even in that nightmare, there are lessons you can learn and there’s joy you can bring people. I don’t take that pain and waste it. I take it and turn it into joy." He elaborated: "I wanted to make a record for people that struggle. I would sit in these chemotherapy rooms, and it’s full of different races and nationalities, religious and political backgrounds, and none of that mattered. It’s just people getting along. Everyone joking while being plugged into machines, trying to keep us alive."

Discussing the album's title, Gilbert stated: "The meaning behind the record is really about getting people to listen to the words, and to think a little more deeply. To not be so hard on themselves all the time, or critical. Because the world makes us critical of ourselves, and the world makes us feel like failures. And at any time, something way scarier than you can ever predict can happen. But, also, something way better can happen. You know, I went into the hospital for something dangerous and it ended up being because I killed a tumour. You just never know what’s going to happen!"

Upon announcing the album, the band stated: "The overall message/theme of this album is to encourage hope through hard times, while also looking at the world as somewhat of a fly on a wall: seeing people's fear, negativity, and stress about small things that only scratch the surface of what life will eventually – but bring in a hopeful way. We want to encourage hope that the hard times will bring growth and strength."

The album's opening song, "Boom Roasted", is named after a quote from The Office episode "Stress Relief", in which Michael Scott attempts to roast his employees.

== Release and promotion ==
Listen Up! was released on February 20, 2026, by Pure Noise Records. The album has had four singles released from it; "100%", "Laugh It Off", "Treat Yourself" and "Beer and Blood Stains".

== Track listing ==
All tracks are written by New Found Glory.

Listen Up! track listing
No.	Title	Length
1.	"Boom Roasted"	2:43
2.	"100%"	3:30
3.	"Laugh It Off"	3:38
4.	"A Love Song"	3:24
5.	"Beer and Blood Stains"	3:19
6.	"Medicine"	4:13
7.	"Treat Yourself"	3:38
8.	"Dream Born Again"	4:25
9.	"You Got This"	3:16
10.	"Frankenstein's Monster"	3:57
Total length:		36:03

== Personnel ==
Credits adapted from the album's liner notes.

=== New Found Glory ===
- Jordan Pundik – lead vocals
- Chad Gilbert – guitar
- Ian Grushka – bass, gang and sing-along vocals
- Cyrus Bolooki – drums, gang and sing-along vocals

=== Additional musicians ===
- Dan O'Connor – additional guitars, gang and sing-along vocals, group photography
- Chris Carrabba – gang and sing-along vocals
- Anthony Raneri – gang and sing-along vocals
- Clint Daniel – gang and sing-along vocals
- Stevie Lowenstein – gang and sing-along vocals
- Nick Dominguez – gang and sing-along vocals
- Josh Portman – gang and sing-along vocals
- Josh "Ghetto Josh" Corbett – gang and sing-along vocals

=== Production personnel ===
- Steve Evetts – production
- Neal Avron – mixing
- Scott Skrzynski – mixing assistance
- Jordan Reed – engineering
- Brody Winger – engineering
- Ted Jensen – mastering

=== Artwork ===
- Tim Singer – design
- Elena De Soto – live photography

== Charts ==
Chart performance for Listen Up!
Chart (2026)	Peak position
Japanese Download Albums (Billboard Japan)	42
Scottish Albums (Official Charts)	43
UK Albums Sales (OCC)	35
UK Independent Albums (Official Charts)	16
UK Rock & Metal Albums (Official Charts)	3
US Top Album Sales (Billboard)	23
US Vinyl Albums (Billboard)	22
