= Coming Home (New Found Glory album) =

Studio album by New Found Glory
- Released: September 19, 2006
- Recorded: January–April 2006
- Studio: Groove Masters, Santa Monica, California
- Genre: Alternative rock; pop punk
- Length: 48:11
- Label: Drive-Thru; Suretone; Geffen
- Producer: Thom Panunzio, New Found Glory

New Found Glory chronology
Catalyst (2004)	Coming Home (2006)	From the Screen to Your Stereo Part II (2007)

Singles from Coming Home
- 1. "It's Not Your Fault" Released: July 25, 2006

Coming Home is the fifth studio album by American rock band New Found Glory. It was produced by the band along with Thom Panunzio and released on September 19, 2006, through Geffen Records. Written and demoed at the Morning View Mansion in Malibu, California during 2005, Coming Home is lyrically themed around being away from home and loved ones. The album marks a departure from the band's earlier work, implementing a more layered and mid-tempo sound that features various piano, keyboard, and string instrumentation more comparable to classic rock than their usual pop punk style.

Despite some backlash due to the change in musical style, Coming Home garnered positive reviews and retrospective commentary. Particularly noted for its matured outlook, the songs are considered the most "mellow" of New Found Glory's career. One single, "It's Not Your Fault", was released. The album's commercial performance was more muted, with it selling well substantially less than previous albums Sticks and Stones (2002) and Catalyst (2004). The album was the band's last release on a major label, as they left Geffen Records the following year before signing with independent labels Bridge Nine and Epitaph Records.

== Background ==
Following the release and prolonged touring of fourth album Catalyst (2004), which included a supporting slot on Green Day's American Idiot Tour, the band were left drained and sought an extended break. They were able to take two months off and regroup afterward, something they had not previously done during their career. The quintet decided to take on a new approach for the writing process of Coming Home, rather than the usual "tour bus and dressing room jams", they moved into a house together in Malibu, California called the Morning View Mansion to write and demo new material. Despite this, main composer and lead guitarist, Chad Gilbert took a book containing over 40 riff ideas that he had written during the previous tour into the mansion. Drummer Cyrus Bolooki explained that, "The whole idea is that we can be sitting around, watching TV, and suddenly be like, 'Hey, I've got an idea. Let's do this'. We've always wanted to do something like this, but we were never sure just how to do it. I know all the guys are really excited to get into the house, hang out and make some music." The band spent four months in Malibu with studio engineer and long-term friend Paul Miner, from August 2005 through November, eventually leaving with 14 finished demos to present to their record label.

== Recording ==
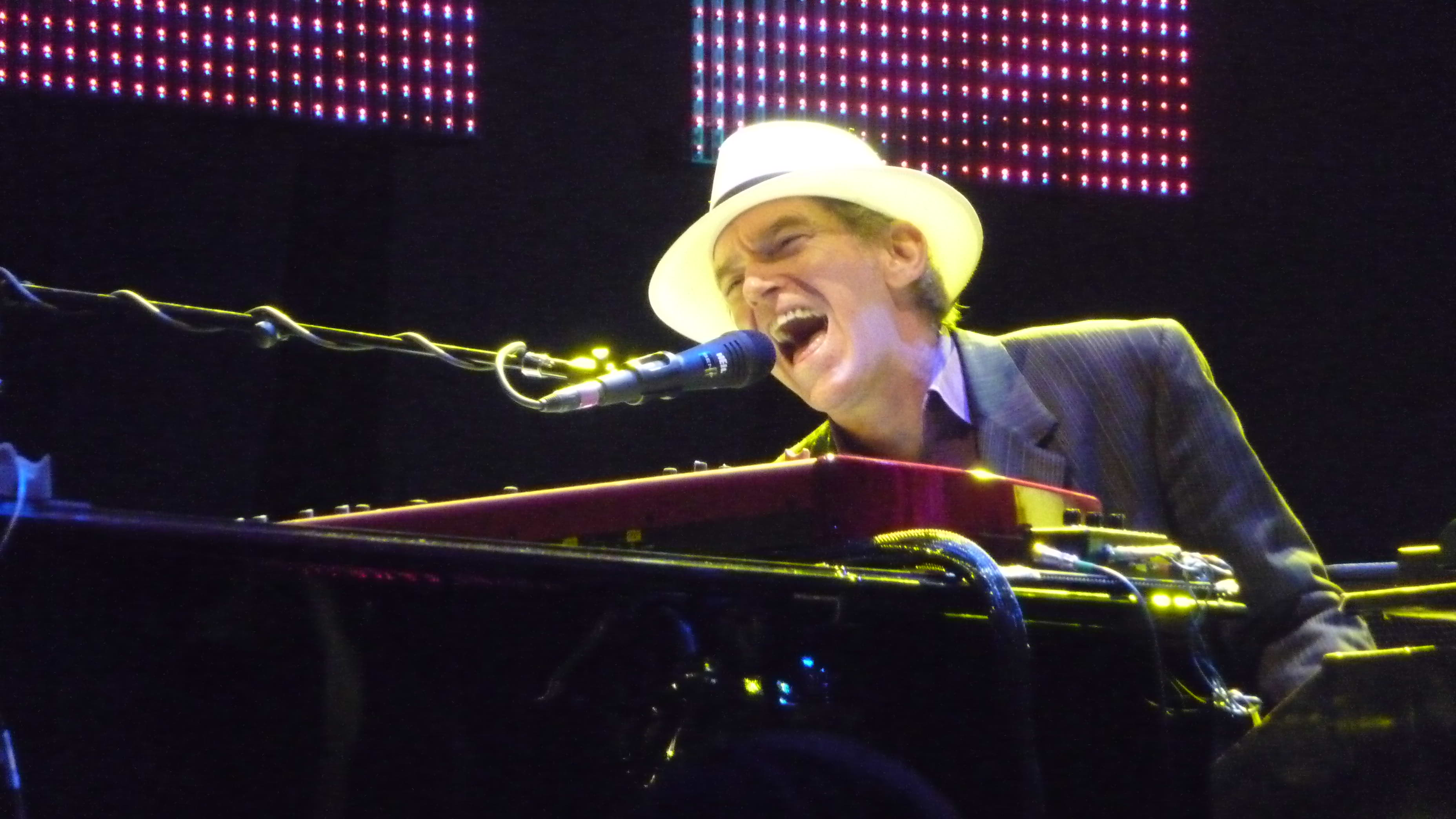
During pre-production, Chad Gilbert tracked melodies on piano using his two pointer fingers. However, due to his relative novice ability on the instrument, the band brought in session musician Benmont Tench to record keys on the album.

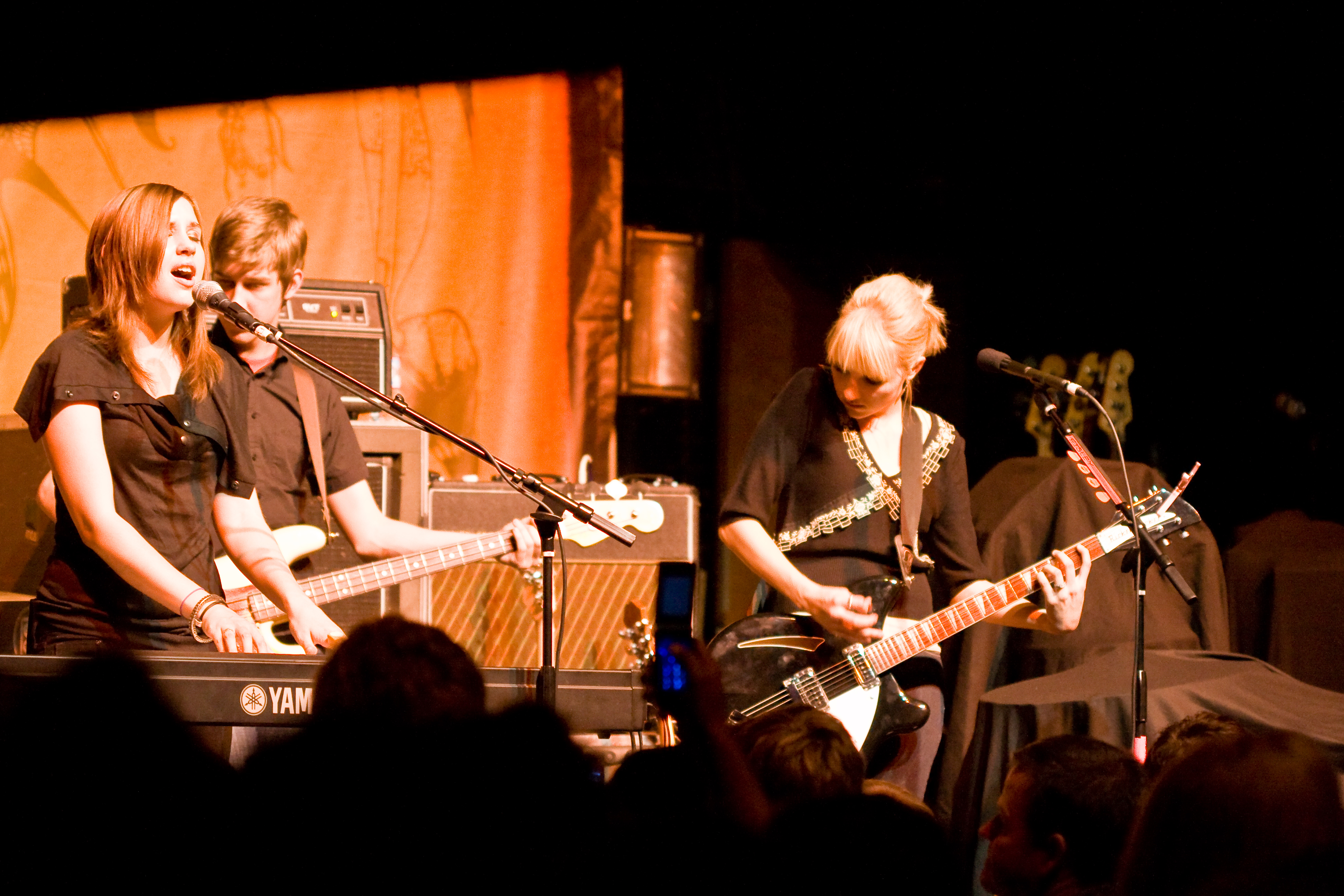
The three sisters of indie rock band Eisley performed female backing vocals on seven tracks from the album. At the time of recording, Gilbert was then engaged to frontwoman and guitarist Sherri DuPree.

The demos finalised in Malibu caught the attention of Thom Panunzio, who aside from his production work (Tom Petty, Bruce Springsteen, Ozzy Osbourne), served as an executive for Geffen Records. The band were flattered by Panunzio's interest, immediately agreeing to the collaboration. The quintet had decided against working with Neal Avron, who had produced the band's three previous albums, as they wanted to try something different. The band's frontman, Jordan Pundik explained that, "We love Neal. Neal's amazing and he's one of our really close friends. But after three records with him, after writing those records and a lot of other bands started to come out and get kind of popular, we kind of wanted to try something different." After hearing a demo of "On My Mind", Panunzio was keen to work on the project. Pundik recalled that, "one of the songs that really got him to say. 'OK, I want to do this' was that song 'On My Mind.' That song really got him. Thom's done everything from like the Go-Go's to Bob Dylan, so he's very well rounded in music."

The band entered Jackson Browne's private recording studio named Groovemasters in January 2006, after Panunzio had suggested it would be a suitable recording location. New Found Glory strove to achieve a "clean kind of classic guitar sound" when recording, using a Vox AC30 amp on almost the entire record. The amp, known for its "jangly" high-end sound, was used with several classic guitars in the studio including a Fender Tele, Les Paul, Gibson 335-S and a Rickenbacker. Gilbert enthused that, "It sounds huge. When you put our old records on and our new record, there's actually less guitars on our new album, but it sounds bigger." Jordan Pundik likewise accounted; "he [Panunzio] brought this classic vibe to it, especially with the tones he got. We learned we don't have to double-up 15 Mesa cabinets and make it all distorted to make it sound big." Pundik also spoke of the band's desire to challenge themselves musically; "Usually with every record we think, 'We’ve got to put the fast punk song on it or people won't like it', but this wasn't anything like that." He did admit that around thirty songs were written, including some fast-paced songs, but were excluded as, "(they) didn't really fit." Steve Klein, the band's principal lyricist and rhythm guitarist, also praised Panunzio for helping the band bring new elements to their sound. Describing the sessions as "best recording experience ever", he added, "It's this empty mansion where we were able to set up all our equipment, we just woke up and wrote songs. We were really relaxed and able to set our own pace. Everything about the record is way more classic rock sounding because Thom has done a bunch of classic rock records like Tom Petty and Bruce Springsteen and Ozzy, and the list goes on and on. He kind of brought this different element to our band. This disc is less guitar driven and more melody driven, more than any other of our records."

One track, the folk-tinged acoustic song "Too Good to Be", was not written until the latter part of recording, only being penned in minutes whilst in the studio. Jordan Pundik joked that, "the funny thing is, that's the song you'd think we wrote sitting on a beach around a fire." While all the songs were primarily written on guitar, Chad Gilbert also tracked melodies on piano, despite his limited ability on the instrument. Gilbert explained that, "When we wrote the songs a couple of songs started out on piano, like the melodies. So in pre-production, I did the piano. But I'm not very good, I can write melodies, but I just use two fingers, my pointer fingers." Panunzio subsequently brought in Benmont Tench (Tom Petty and the Heartbreakers) to play the keyboard, piano and organ parts throughout the album. Paul Buckmaster conducted string sections for "When I Die" and "Boulders", while indie rock band Eisley, comprising three sisters including Gilbert's then-fiancée Sherri DuPree, provided female backing vocals for seven tracks on the album. Once the process of mixing and mastering the record had finalised, the band asked Autumn de Wilde, best known for her portraiture and commercial photography of musicians, to shoot the cover art and liner photography for the album booklet. Chad Gilbert later declared that he was "really proud", citing the music as "the most uplifting" the band had ever written, while Pundik added that Coming Home would be "the one that will stand the test of time."

== Composition ==
=== Music ===
"Oxygen"
"Oxygen" is composed in the B minor key at 78 bpm, and has been noted for displaying characteristics found throughout Coming Home. Boasting "stuttering rhythms and full-bodied guitars", the track has been described as a "grand love ballad" that is "serious in tone but retains the group's ability to produce a catchy hook."

"When I Die"
Written in the F major key with a slow tempo of 61 bpm, "When I Die" was penned by guitarist Chad Gilbert about his father's death. The song contains keys, driving guitars and a prominent string section, seeing it described as "low key" and one of "the most beautiful moments" on Coming Home.

Music critics agreed that Coming Home represents a more "mature" sound than previously heard from the band. The album's mellow tone and more layered sound is attributed to the inclusion of other musical instruments such as keys, piano, and strings, concurrent with their traditional rock-based setup of guitar, bass and drums. Many fans of the band were initially taken aback by the album's direction. Indeed, music journalist Nick Mindicino later reflected on how the band had "crafted something truly ingenious and unexpected: a somber, honest, polished and pop-alternative record." Andrew Sacher of BrooklynVegan noted how the band "traded their snotty pop punk for a warmer, softer, and often ballad-driven form of alternative rock" on Coming Home. In a 2014 article for Contactmusic, Joe DeAndrea likewise noted how the album had "a much tighter sound musically with a focus on melodies and "mature" lyrics as opposed to rockin’ pop-punk riffs." Most distinctive among the musical arrangements on Coming Home is that only three of the album's thirteen tracks ("Hold My Hand", "Taken Back by You", "Too Good to Be") contain high tempos of over 130 beats per minute. Unlike their earlier work, with fast-paced pop punk songs such as "My Friends Over You" and "Truth of My Youth" (both in excess of 150 bpm), various tracks such as "Oxygen", "Make Your Move", "When I Die", "Connected", and "Boulders" contain "moderately slow" tempos of no more than 80 bpm.

Prior to the album's release, Chad Gilbert explained, "The songs are all pretty different, sonically speaking" and said that lead single "It's Not Your Fault", has "big, full guitars and a piano line that goes throughout. It's pretty anthemic, and Jordan's voice has never sounded better." The guitarist also noted that the album's cleaner guitar sound was attributed to little distortion effects used in comparison to earlier albums, while describing "On My Mind" as "this modern New Found Glory twist on a classic rock song." Brendan Manley of Alternative Press called the album a "statement of sentiment that stands apart in the NFG discography", while The Palm Beach Post opined that, "Coming Home is similar, in spirit, to the 1990s crooning of Chicago's brilliant Smoking Popes. Jordan Pundik's vocal delivery curls into sweetness, rather than a snarl. Wrapped around journal-entry cute lines on the boppy, '80s-ish "Hold My Hand" and the earnestly protective pleadings of "It's Not Your Fault." Jack Foley of Indie London wrote "Gilbert’s guitars are crisp, lively and fresh, while the vocal melodies are strong enough to have everyone singing along at some point. Take the feel-good romp that’s "Too Good To Be" for example. It's vibrant in every sense, boasting some gloriously breezy guitar riffs and some fine vocal layering, with almost hand-clapping beats."

The Salt Lake Tribune said that the album "largely drops the punk-by-numbers that dominated past efforts to get a little more personal lyrically, thus becoming more approachable." Alan Sculley of The Daily Herald explained that, "Coming Home pretty much leaves any punk element behind. The songs still rock - just note the wallop delivered by "Hold My Hand" or "Connected." But the band pulls back on the tempos of virtually all of the songs." Scene Point Blank writer Chris Abraham noted, "Coming Home still encompasses the things that make New Found Glory great. Relatable lyrics, hooks so melodic and catchy that my hands are red from not buying a mitt, and, despite a mellower tone, I could still imagine myself going fucking nuts singing along to these songs live." AbsolutePunk founder Jason Tate warned that, "it's crucial you abandon any pre-conceived expectations for this album. If you're anticipating the band's previous albums re-hashed, you're going to be completely let-down. While the choruses and sing-a-long hooks could compete with the best on any of their previous albums - it's the slower melodic approach to the songs that truly makes the album come alive and fully breathe." Rae Alexandra of Kerrang! magazine called the album a "massive departure" and suggested that, "NFG are taking what will be, by far, the biggest gamble of their career. Some of you won't even recognise them immediately; it's not fast, it's not forced, but - in an entirely new way - it soars." In an earlier Kerrang! article discussing the album, Alexandra wrote that "It's Not Your Fault" displays "more maturity - and piano - than ever before", while "When I Die" is "low key with orchestral accents", making it "one of the most beautiful moments on Coming Home." Corey Apar of AllMusic was in agreement and stated that "from the album's packaging to the comfortable nature of the music, it actually feels more mature in a way that is catchy without seeming to care about radio accessibility." Killian Young of Consequence said the album was "buoyed by jubilant piano flourishes" and "features strong melodies and more refined love songs."

=== Lyrics ===
"There are always songs about death that are really sad, but this is an uplifting song that gives me strength."

—Chad Gilbert, describing "When I Die", a song written about his father's death.

Lyrically, the album is specifically about dealing with time apart in relationships and familial issues whilst on the road. The album's more serious tone has been attributed to the developing family life of the band (including new marriages and children). Alan Sculley of The Daily Herald explained that, "Catalyst marked a move toward slightly more mature and serious material about relationships and life issues That lyrical direction is even more pronounced on Coming Home." The band were particularly inspired by early Beatles records, seeing Chad Gilbert penning lyrics alongside Pundik and primary lyricist Steve Klein for the first time. Gilbert explained that, "I've always been a part of the music and I've always written the music for the band, but I've never been a part of the lyrics. This time I just kind of felt like in order to kind of have the best record, we had to do things different. That's what made it stand out like that." Regarding the album title, Gilbert detailed that the songs "are all sort of tied together by this theme of wanting to go home", while drummer Cyrus Bolooki said that the title track was one of the first songs written for the album and after assessing the lyrics "it was a phrase that sat well with we wanted the record to communicate."

Jordan Pundik later accounted, "I'm not comparing my band to the Beatles whatsoever, but their [early] records were simple songs about love and relationships, and people could relate to their songs because they understood what they were trying to say. That's what this record reminds me of. There's not weird metaphors. It's just straight up, wearing your heart on your sleeve." Steve Klein emphasised the shift in mood from their previous album by stating, "I think every record we make we try and capture a time period. When writing the songs for Coming Home it was more positive than negative. I felt on the last record, Catalyst, we were very negative lyrically. You can tell that by the titles "All Downhill From Here" and "This Disaster," it was a heavier record. Coming Home on the other hand takes you to a different place. It's the record I feel we’ve been waiting our whole career to do, taking everything people love about NFG and bringing it to the next level." Bassist Ian Grushka further explained, "We only really talk about personal things that have affected us first-hand, our songs are about emotions rather than some political agenda." The song, "When I Die" was written by Gilbert about the death of his father. When initially writing the bridge section for the song, Gilbert found the experience emotionally draining and had to leave the studio in order to compose himself. Despite this, he maintains that while song is "sad", it remains "a good sad." He reflected this in the album's liner notes by adding, "It is a song about accepting death and finding the bright side of the situation. I'm no longer afraid to die because I have my father there waiting for me on the other side."

== Release and promotion ==
Chad Gilbert performs acoustically during a store signing promoting Coming Home

Coming Home was first announced in June 2006, with the band citing a scheduled release date of September, with lead single "It's Not Your Fault" preceding the album in July. "It's Not Your Fault" was released to radio on July 25; that same day, "Hold My Hand" was posted online. The music video for "It's Not Your Fault" would eventually make its worldwide debut on August 1 through Total Request Live. On August 29, the band revealed the album's track listing. A week prior to the album's release, the band posted a mock open letter to Lionel Richie, who was also about to release a new album of the same name the following week. The band jokingly threatened to name their next project Dancing on the Ceiling (Richie's 1986 album), writing, "Congrats this week on the release of your new CD Coming Home - what an awesome title! Sounds familiar though, where did we hear that before? Oh yeah, it's the name of our new CD which drops Tues. Sept. 19. Our new single and video is 'It's Not Your Fault.' Hey...we haven't heard your song yet...Send us a copy."

On September 11, 2006, Coming Home was made available for streaming via the band's PureVolume account. The album was released on September 13, 19 and 25 in Japan, North America and the United Kingdom respectively. Following the release, the band announced a 34-date tour of North America stretching from Cincinnati to Boston, with support from the Early November and Cartel. The band had initially planned to release either the title track "Coming Home" or "On My Mind" as the second single, however due to internal problems at Geffen Records, any further release plans were scrapped. Just after the album was released Jordan Schur, the labels president, lost his job. With no focus on the record in the immediate aftermath, Pundik recalls, "Everything fell apart and Coming Home was just forgotten about. The record didn't stand a chance." In November and December 2006, they embarked on a short UK tour with Say Anything. Later the label would offer the band a new contract under a subsidiary label called Octone Records, however the band declined and parted ways with the label in early 2007. Despite this, the band continued to tour in support of the album, touring with Fall Out Boy in January 2007. They toured Japan as part of the Punk Spring Fest and then Australia for a week with Paramore. In April 2007, they appeared at the Groezrock festival in Europe, and played The Bamboozle festival upon returning to the US. On September 6, 2022, Coming Home was released on vinyl for the first time ever through Take This to Heart Records and Parting Gifts Records. The first pressing was limited to 2000 copies which sold out in only one minute of being released. The second pressing was announced shortly after with another 2000 copies pressed. The second pressing sold out in the first day, making Coming Home officially the most successful and highest anticipated record release in the band's career. The second pressing is scheduled to ship in early 2023.

== Critical reception ==
Professional ratings
Review scores
Source	Rating
AllMusic	4/5 stars
AbsolutePunk	8.8/10
Alternative Press	5/5 stars
Big Cheese	4/5 stars
The Dallas Morning News	favorable
Entertainment Weekly	B
Kerrang!	4/5 stars
New York Post	3/4 stars
The Palm Beach Post	A−
Rock Sound	9/10

Coming Home garnered acclaim from music critics. Praise often centered on the album's "matured, nuanced songwriting" and slower musicianship. Seen as a departure from their previous work, the songs have been described as the most "mellow" of New Found Glory's career, yet still employing "the group's firmly established talent for writing strong melodies." The Daily Trojan writer Nick Mindicino has asserted that while the album is often overlooked in the band's discography, it remains "truly their best work." In a 2019 article ranking the top 100 pop punk bands, Consequence of Sound writer Killian Young stated "Sticks and Stones and Catalyst still represent the band’s commercial peak, but 2006’s Coming Home remains a gem in their mid-career discography. Buoyed by jubilant piano flourishes, the album features strong melodies and more refined love songs." AbsolutePunk founder Jason Tate paid compliment to the album's change in direction from earlier material, noting how "the album hits us as the summer months fade and the air bends to the onslaught of fall. Incidentally, the band's musical thermometer is still intact. Instead of an album full of summer-fist-pumping-anthems they've released the perfect music by which to watch the leaves fall from the trees." He went on to add that Coming Home "certainly has the qualities that could make it a classic in time". Corey Apar of AllMusic awarded the album a four star rating and praised the "at-ease spirit of Coming Home". He emphasised the new approach by adding, "the band is now in a position to simply enjoy itself without needing to forcibly shove saccharine-saturated hooks down the throats of anyone standing nearby. Make no mistake - this is a New Found Glory album through and through. It's full of melody, personality, and all the best attributes of their earlier work presented in a way that grows more memorable with each listen." Brendan Manley of Alternative Press was unanimously positive and awarded a perfect five-star rating. He noted that the album "extracts their finest qualities. Launching with the excellent "Oxygen", Coming Home boasts stuttering rhythms, full-bodied guitars and gold plated vocal harmonies. NFG have made the best album of their career." Paul Hagen of Big Cheese magazine awarded a four-star rating and commended the band's experimentation. He offered particular praise to the guitar work, of which he described as "rousing and memorable." He later summed up Coming Home as a "creative, earnest and emotive" record. Texas based newspaper, The Dallas Morning News also gave a favorable review and described the album as a "sober, but happy record that recalls the band's formative days in sound and spirit." Simon Vozick-Levinson, critic for Entertainment Weekly, awarded the album a "B" grade and noted the maturity found amongst the songs; "Like Green Day and Blink-182 before them, Florida-bred five-some New Found Glory has outgrown the bratty attitude that made them famous".

Alex Lai of Contactmusic likewise noted that, "Those who are familiar with the earlier work of NFG are in for a shock. Beginning in more relaxed fashion than expected, "Oxygen" is a grand love ballad, serious in tone but retaining the group's ability to produce a catchy hook. Far from being a one-off experiment, these are actually the characteristics to the album and like Blink-182 before going on hiatus, New Found Glory have allowed their music to mature." Jack Foley of Indie London, gave the album four stars out of five and described it as "utterly engaging". While mentioning standout tracks, he added, "The low-key "Make Your Move" drops some beautifully cascading riffs, while, the chiming piano chords that open "It’s Not Your Fault" give way into an effortlessly inspiring song." People magazine declared that Coming Home is "their best album yet", while Dan Aquilante of The New York Post awarded a score of three stars out of four and wrote that the album is "a smart, stylistic mix rich in vocal harmonies, it's driven by guitar and piano breaks. The notion of getting back to family, friends and better days connects the 13 tracks." British rock publication Kerrang! awarded the album a "great" four K! rating. Rae Alexandra opined that Coming Home "displays a new level of sensitivity and subtlety; a new take on harmonies and melodies." He noted that while the album isn't as immediate as previous material, it will "move you far more deeply in the long run. It's hopeful; learned; masterfully executed. It's everything New Found Glory have been leading to all this time; and it's everything we never knew they had in them. Absolutely stunning." Florida-based newspaper, The Palm Beach Post were also highly favorable and graded the album as an "A−". They wrote, "It's all written in beautifully vulnerable, snarkless, shout-it-out-loud terms, with an unself-conscious joy in the lyrics, the do-do-dos and the muted hand claps that find a sweet, genuine current of emotion without sacrificing edge. Pundik's delivery is never cloying, ironic or dumb. Underscored by drummer Cyrus Bolooki's strong beat, the songs are like a pre-made mix tape about the ups and downs of making yourself honestly vulnerable to another human being. Bravo." Rock Sound journalist Tim Newbound rated the album at nine out of ten and particularly praised the band's progression. Writing that, "New Found Glory have come of age. Their punchy punk-pop styling of old may have temporarily waned, but their knack of writing inducing melodies amid sincere delivery has only intensified. Pundik's nasal-edged vocals have now blossomed into a fuller pitch, perfectly complementing his band's more tuneful and matured musicianship. Top notch."

=== Accolades ===
Coming Home received recognition in year-end lists compiled by the music media. Alternative Press included the album in their end-of-year "Essential Albums" list, with editor Leslie Simon writing, "From the opening chords of "Oxygen" to the ethereal wafting of "Boulders," I admittedly fell in love with this album the first time I heard it." In AbsolutePunk's staff compiled "Top 30 Albums of the Year" feature, the album placed at number twelve, with Jason Tate noting, "Coming Home features a slick sound from Florida pop-punkers New Found Glory. They aren't shy about pulling out the ballads, nor are they shy about racking up the points in our list." While fellow AbsolutePunk staff writer Drew Beringer placed "Connected" from the album on his list containing his favorite tracks of 2006.

Publication	Country	Nominated work	Accolade	Year	Rank
AbsolutePunk	United States	Coming Home	Top Thirty Albums of the Year	2006	12
AbsolutePunk	United States	"Connected"	Drew Beringer's Best Songs of the Year	2006	*
Alternative Press	United States	Coming Home	Ten Essential Albums of the Year	2006	*

* denotes an unordered list

== Commercial performance ==
Coming Home debuted at number eight on the Billboard Rock Albums chart and just inside the top twenty on the main Billboard 200 chart, at number nineteen, with sales of 83,123. The album also entered the Billboard Tastemaker Albums chart at number thirteen. The Tastemaker chart is not decided by record sales, but compiled by ranking new albums based on "an influential panel of indie stores and small regional chains." The album's sales fell quickly, and the album fell off the chart after 6 weeks. By 2008, the album had sold 145,000 copies in the US.

Overall, this marked a drop in performance in comparison to their previous two releases; Catalyst (2004) and Sticks and Stones (2002) debuted on the Billboard 200 at number three and four respectively, each going on to sell over 500,000 units. In a 2016 retrospective, Gilbert noted that the album's new sound not being well received well inspired the band to move in an entirely different direction for their next album. The band left Geffen and signed with independent label Epitaph Records for the band's next release, Not Without a Fight (2009). The band abandoned Coming Home's emotional, softer sound in favor of a collection of "punk songs". However, it did not help the slide in the band's commercial performance; the album topped the Billboard Independent Albums chart but only sold 26,900 in its opening week, debuting on Billboard 200 at number twelve. The release was also burdened by an internet leak six weeks before its release.

== Track listing ==
All tracks are written by New Found Glory.

Coming Home
No.	Title	Length
1.	"Oxygen"	3:15
2.	"Hold My Hand"	3:42
3.	"It's Not Your Fault"	3:37
4.	"On My Mind"	3:56
5.	"Coming Home"	4:09
6.	"Make Your Move"	4:02
7.	"Taken Back by You"	3:25
8.	"Too Good to Be"	2:59
9.	"Love and Pain"	3:03
10.	"Familiar Landscapes"	3:19
11.	"When I Die"	3:43
12.	"Connected"	3:38
13.	"Boulders"	5:22
Total length:		48:11

iTunes edition
No.	Title	Length
14.	"Making Plans"	3:00

Best Buy exclusive
No.	Title	Length
14.	"Over Me"	2:49

UK edition
No.	Title	Length
14.	"Make It Right"	3:09
15.	"Golden"	3:37

Japanese edition
No.	Title	Length
14.	"Make It Right"	3:09
15.	"Golden"	3:37
16.	"It's All Around You"	2:27

== Personnel ==
The following personnel contributed to Coming Home, as adapted from the album's liner notes.

New Found Glory

- Jordan Pundik – lead vocals, lyrics
- Chad Gilbert – lead guitar, composer, lyrics
- Steve Klein – rhythm guitar, lyrics
- Ian Grushka – bass guitar
- Cyrus Bolooki – drums, percussion

Additional musicians

- Paul Buckmaster – conductor, string arrangement
- Benmont Tench – organ, piano, keys
- Eisley – all backing vocals
- Jarett Grushka – triangle

Production

- Thom Panunzio, New Found Glory – producers
- Paul Miner – engineering
- Tom Lord-Alge – mixing
- Ted Jensen – mastering
- J. Peter Robinson – art direction
- Matt Taylor – design
- Autumn de Wilde – photography

== Charts ==
Chart (2006)	Peak position
Australian Albums Chart (ARIA)	48
U.K Album Chart (The Official Charts Company)	86
U.S Billboard 200	19
U.S Rock Albums (Billboard)	8
U.S Tastemaker Albums (Billboard)	13

== Release history ==
Region	Date	Label	Format	Catalogue #	Ref.
Japan	September 13, 2006	Universal	Compact Disc, digital download	UICF-1077	
United States	September 19, 2006	Geffen	Compact Disc, digital download	B0007676-02	
United Kingdom	September 25, 2006	Geffen	Compact Disc, digital download	CID1706	
