= New Found Glory =

American rock band

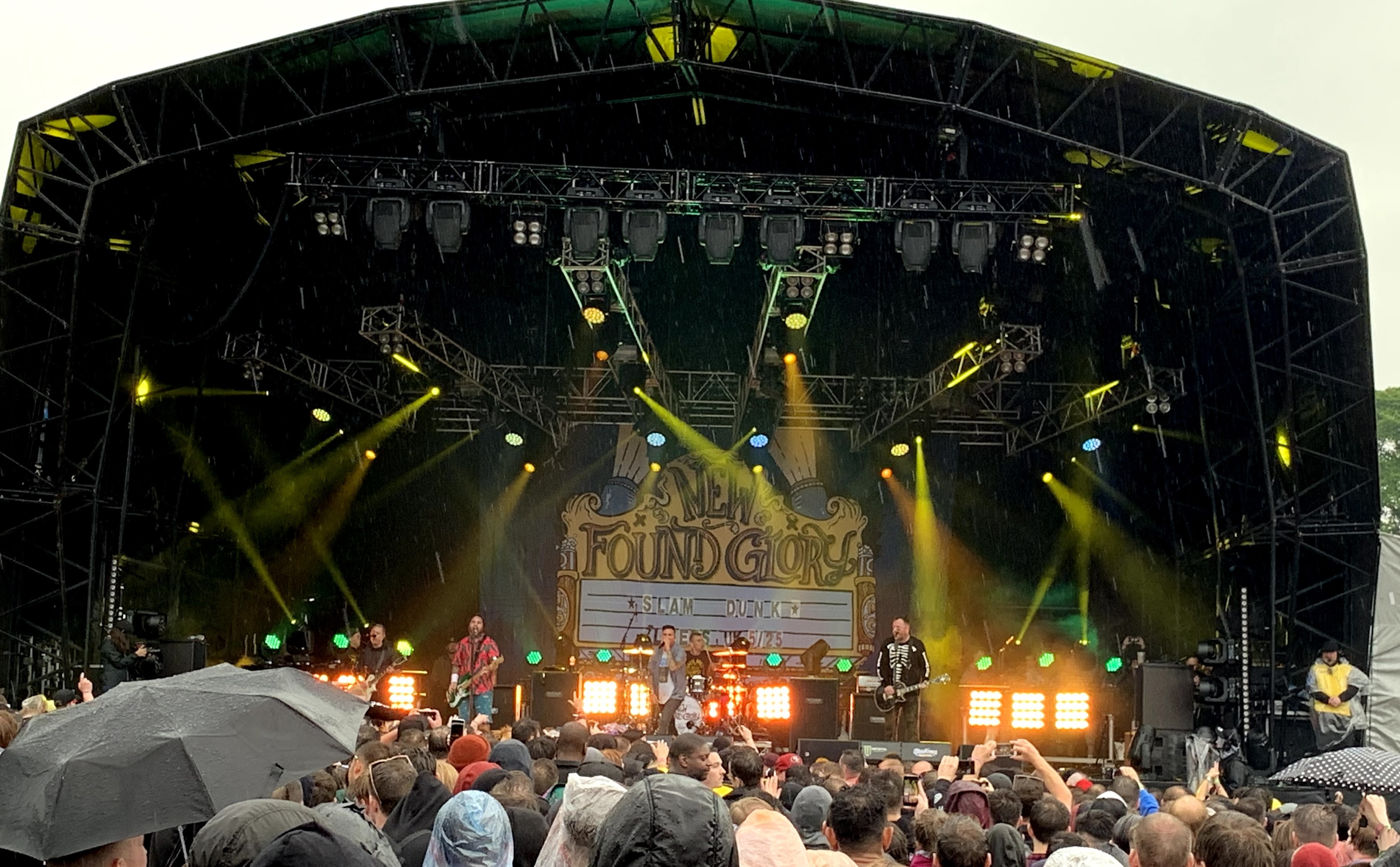
- New Found Glory performing live at Slam Dunk Festival in 2019

Background information
- Also known as: NFG; A New Found Glory; International Superheroes of Hardcore
- Origin: Coral Springs, Florida, U.S.
- Genres: Pop-punk; alternative rock; melodic hardcore; punk rock
- Works: New Found Glory discography
- Years active: 1997–present
- Labels: Fiddler; Eulogy; Drive-Thru; MCA; Geffen; Suretone; Bridge 9; Epitaph; Hopeless; Revelation; Pure Noise
- Members: Jordan Pundik; Cyrus Bolooki; Ian Grushka
- Past members: Steve Klein; Joe Marino; Chad Gilbert
- Website: newfoundglory.com
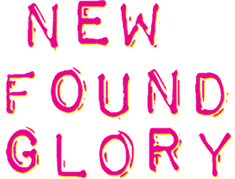

New Found Glory (formerly A New Found Glory) is an American rock band formed in Coral Springs, Florida, in 1997. The band currently consists of Jordan Pundik (lead vocals), Cyrus Bolooki (drums), and Ian Grushka (bass). Longtime rhythm guitarist and lyricist Steve Klein was removed from the band in late 2013, while lead guitarist Chad Gilbert died in September 2026. During their lengthy recording career, the band have released eleven studio albums, one live album, two EPs, and four cover albums.

After forming in 1997, New Found Glory released their debut studio album Nothing Gold Can Stay in 1999. The band then released their self-titled major label debut in 2000, with the album's song "Hit or Miss" peaking at number 15 the Alternative Songs chart. In 2002, the band became mainstream with their album Sticks and Stones and the album's hit "My Friends Over You". The group's popularity continued with their 2004 album Catalyst, of which the video for "All Downhill From Here" was nominated for a VMA for Breakthrough Video of the Year. Led by single "It's Not Your Fault", the mid-tempo and critically acclaimed Coming Home followed in 2006. The release showcased a temporary move to an alternative rock style instead of their usual pop punk sound. The quintet returned to their energetic roots with the release of Not Without a Fight in 2009. They have since released (amongst others) Radiosurgery in 2011, Resurrection in 2014, Makes Me Sick in 2017, Forever + Ever x Infinity in 2020, December's Here in 2021, Make The Most Of It in 2023 and Listen Up! in 2026.

Emerging as part of the second wave of pop punk in the late 1990s, music critics consider them a key pioneer of the genre. Often labelled the "godfathers of pop punk", AllMusic notes how their "raucous, fast-paced anthems carried them through the decades", whilst crediting them for "practically serving alongside the work of Blink-182 as the blueprint to the entire genre for the early 2000s." Rock Sound have championed their "classic sugar sweet sound", which combines "pop-punk and hardcore in one neat package." Alternative Press have praised the group for their "innovative and entirely irresistible fusion of punk melodies and hardcore breakdowns." As such, the band is considered highly influential in the development of the subgenre easycore.

== History ==
=== 1997–1999: Formation and Nothing Gold Can Stay ===
"The Blue Stare"

"Passing Time"
Samples of "The Blue Stare" and "Passing Time" from Nothing Gold Can Stay (1999). The album's grainy sound was a result of a low recording budget, which the band financed themselves. The release and a rigorous touring schedule soon earned the band a significant following.

The origins of New Found Glory date back to 1997 when Jordan Pundik (vocals) and Ian Grushka (bass) played together in the bands Inner City Kids and Flip 60. After disbanding Flip 60, they recruited Stephen Klein (guitar), who Pundik met at Marjory Stoneman Douglas High School and had previously played with him in the band Fallview. The three began to jam together. Practicing in Grushka's garage, they later invited Joe "Taco Joe" Marino to play drums. Shortly thereafter, Chad Gilbert (lead guitar), former vocalist of Shai Hulud, joined to complete the quintet.

Pundik later stated the band name was created while he and Klein were working at Red Lobster together; "We came up with A New Found Glory, we wrote it on a napkin. I think we pulled some of it from "A Newfound Interest in Massachusetts" by the Get Up Kids". The band recorded their debut EP, It's All About the Girls (1997) in a friend's apartment, and the EP was distributed by local independent label Fiddler Records. Soon after, Marino was replaced by current drummer Cyrus Bolooki after two rehearsal sessions. The band went on to tour up and down the East Coast and quickly sold out the entire pressing of the EP. The band's underground success soon caught the attention of Eulogy Recordings and the quintet subsequently signed shortly afterwards in order to increase distribution of their music.

Following the success of their EP, the band recorded their debut full-length album, Nothing Gold Can Stay (1999), initially selling one-page insert copies at their shows supporting MxPx. Richard Reines, co-founder of Drive-Thru Records had also noted their devout following and held talks with the band. Drive-Thru subsequently signed the five-piece and paid Eulogy $5,000 to license Nothing Gold Can Stay, which went on to sell more than 300,000 copies.

=== 2000–2005: New Found Glory, Sticks and Stones and Catalyst ===
Upon the release of their debut major-label album, the band used this logo to represent the start of a new era. The logo was used during the releases of New Found Glory (2000) and Sticks and Stones (2002) and then revived by the band in 2007 in the album From the Screen to Your Stereo Part II and again in Radiosurgery (2011).

The five-piece signed their first proper record deal with Drive-Thru Records, and released an EP of cover songs from film soundtracks entitled From the Screen to Your Stereo in 2000. Drive-Thru's relationship with MCA Records ensured that the smaller label's more popular bands would be picked up by the major. Later that year, debut single "Hit or Miss" peaked at No. 15 on the US Modern Rock Chart, which helped propel the band to a mainstream audience. Subsequently, their self-titled second album and major label debut New Found Glory (2000) reached number one on the Billboard Heatseekers chart, and spent 21 weeks on the Billboard 200 chart. In a Kerrang! magazine article years later, they referred to the album as the band's Essential Purchase. They wrote, "marking one of the biggest and quickest improvements in alternative music, the major label debut hurled them to the forefront of the punk scene barely 12 months after its predecessor. Packed with infectious melodies and sing-along anthems, it would see them jostling with the likes of Blink-182 for the genre's crown." The album also marked the official debut of the band's new moniker, which dropped the indefinite article "A" from their original name due to some fans struggling to find the band's records in stores. The album was certified gold by the RIAA. In 2001 the band performed at EdgeFest Calgary.

Between 2002 and 2004, the band experienced the height of their popularity with headline slots on the Warped Tour with Blink-182 and a supporting tour with Green Day. Third album Sticks and Stones was released on June 11, 2002, and peaked at number four on the Billboard 200 chart. The record spawned two popular singles; "My Friends Over You" and "Head on Collision". Following the success of the album, the band headlined the 2002 Warped Tour and later saw the album certified gold by the RIAA.

The lead single for their fourth album, "All Downhill from Here" reached number eleven in the Rock Chart before Catalyst (2004) was released. The album peaked at a career-high number three on the Billboard 200, selling 146,000 copies in its first week. The heavier style of the record, which included some metal and new wave influences, was due to the comparisons that magazines and other media outlets would make between New Found Glory and other popular bands. Chad Gilbert stated: "Well, when Sticks and Stones came out and we were doing that Honda Civic Tour, we were getting compared to bands like Good Charlotte and Simple Plan we were angry with that. At that point, we were getting compared to more pop bands and we aren't a pop band." The band promoted the album with a supporting tour with Green Day during the fall of 2004 on the American Idiot Tour. The song "This Disaster" was featured in EA Sports' Madden NFL 2005, and "At Least I'm Known for Something" was featured in EA's Burnout 3: Takedown. This became the band's third record to be certified gold by the RIAA.

=== 2006–2009: Coming Home and Not Without a Fight ===
"Oxygen"

"When I Die"
Samples of "Oxygen" and "When I Die" from Coming Home (2006). The album saw the band take on a more mature sound. Drawing influence from classic rock, the album features piano, keyboards and string sections to create slower and more melodic songs.

Demos for the next album were tracked with long-term friend and studio engineer Paul Miner, before the band worked with Thom Panunzio (Tom Petty, Bruce Springsteen, Ozzy Osbourne) having moved into a house together in Malibu, California called the Morning View Mansion to write and record. Gilbert took into the studio a book containing over 40 riff ideas that were written during the previous tour. Unlike their previous releases, Gilbert and Pundik also worked on lyrics alongside primary lyricist Steve Klein for the first time. The band had decided against working with Neal Avron, who had produced the band's three previous albums, as they wanted to try something different. Their fifth album titled Coming Home was released on September 19, 2006, with first single, "It's Not Your Fault" in July 2006. The release proved popular with many critics giving the album positive reviews. It was acclaimed for its "matured and nuanced songwriting", and was generally recognised as being the band's most mature work.

From the Screen to Your Stereo Part II, the band's follow-up to From the Screen to Your Stereo – a full-length album, containing 11 songs plus one bonus track for the Japanese edition and iTunes – was released on September 18, 2007, via Drive-Thru Records. The first and only single from the album was "Kiss Me", which would become the band's last charting single. The music video can be viewed on MySpace. In March 2008, a compilation named Hits was released. Two previously unreleased songs, "Situations" and "Constant Static", are also featured on the album. This was their last release on Drive-Thru/Geffen before signing with independent labels, Bridge Nine Records and Epitaph Records. In April 2008, the band released a new EP Tip of the Iceberg on CD, 7-inch and through digital music outlets on Bridge 9 Records containing both new material that paid homage to their melodic hardcore influences. The CD also included an extra disc from the band's side project, the International Superheroes of Hardcore, named Takin' It Ova!.

"Right Where We Left Off"

"This Isn't You"
Samples of "Right Where We Left Off" and "This Isn't You". The album saw the band return to their faster and more energetic roots after the mid-tempo, melodic rock of Coming Home.

Their seventh studio album, Not Without a Fight, was released on March 10, 2009, and was produced by Mark Hoppus. It was released through the band's new label, Epitaph Records. Hoppus has said that during recording, they had felt like a different band altogether. The lead single from the album was called "Listen to Your Friends". The music video for the song was filmed in Los Angeles. The single was released December 23, 2008, in the US & a day earlier in the UK, both via iTunes & AmazonMP3. Following the album's release, the quintet set out on the "Not Without a Fight Tour" with support from Set Your Goals, Bayside and Shai Hulud.

The video for second single "Don't Let Her Pull You Down" premiered on October 15, and was released on October 20 via limited orange and sky blue vinyl prints. On October 17 the band played a free show for around 120 fans packed into the studio where the band played a setlist made up of fan requests.

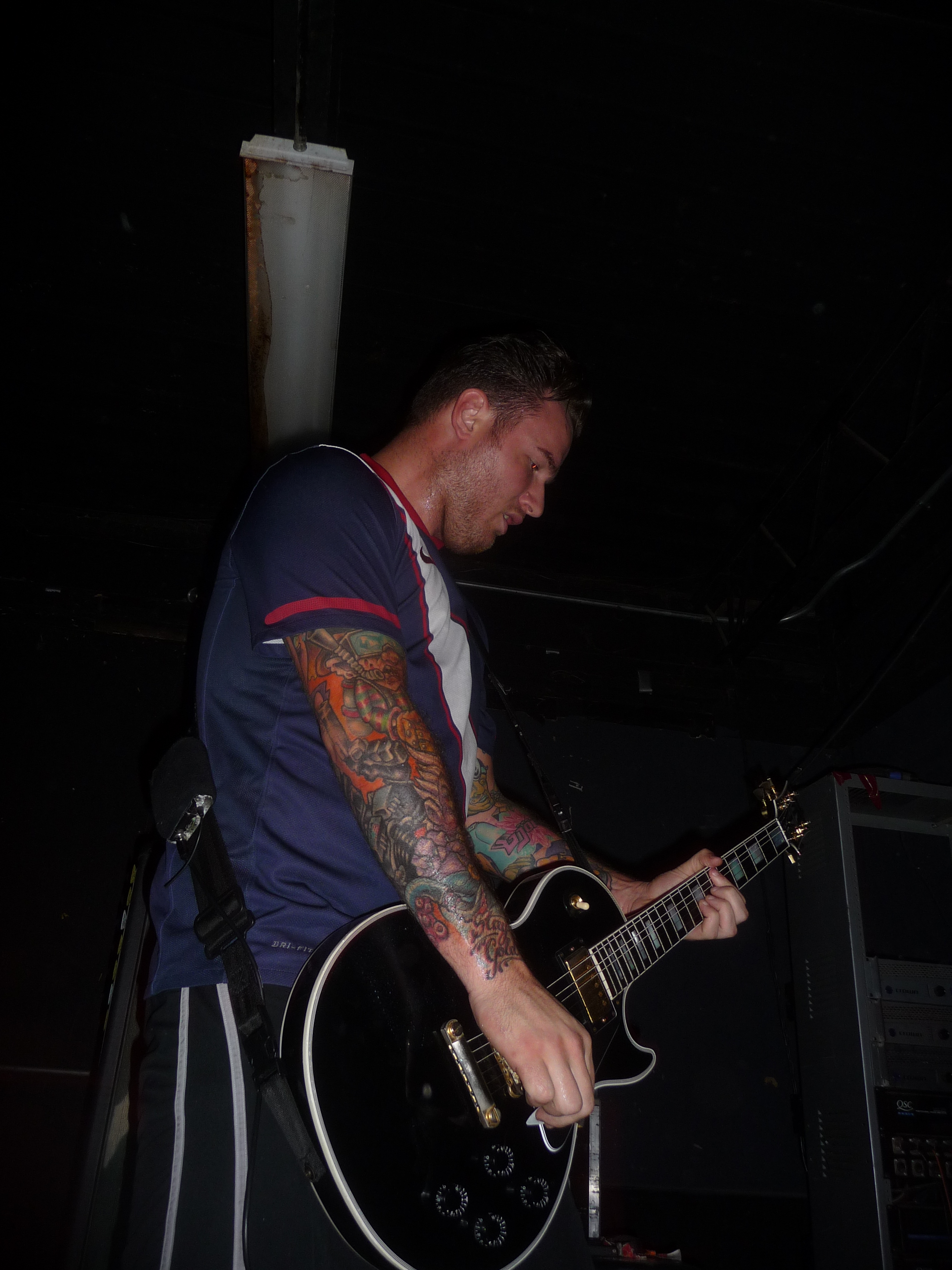
Chad Gilbert performs in Oklahoma City on September 11, 2010

=== 2010–2013: Radiosurgery and Klein's departure ===
A special edition re-release to celebrate the tenth anniversary of their self-titled album was released on January 26, 2010, through Geffen Records. The additional material included new liner notes, demos, b-sides, The Story So Far DVD and a remix of debut single "Hit or Miss" by the late Jerry Finn. A full tour was also confirmed where the band would play the record in its entirety, with support from Saves the Day, Hellogoodbye and Fireworks. On the 29th and 30 May, the band headlined the Pop-Punk festival SlamDunk Festival held in Hatfield and Leeds. Shortly before the start of the band's commemorative tour, Gilbert visited his doctor for pneumonia. After suspicious cells were discovered in his thyroid, he underwent surgery which caused him to miss the first three dates of the new tour. Anthony Raneri of Bayside replaced him for this period. The surgery was a success. Later that year, the band headlined the Slam Dunk Festival along with Alkaline Trio and Capdown.

New Found Glory began the new year by participating in the 2011 Soundwave Festival, and were later confirmed for the Reading and Leeds Festivals in August. The band also played a full tribute set to The Ramones with Marky Ramone on drums at The Bamboozle 2011 Festival.

They returned to the studio in April to record their eighth album, titled Radiosurgery with Neal Avron the producer having also produced their second, third and fourth albums. Chad Gilbert has said that Radiosurgery "is the most upbeat, fun record we've ever recorded. Catchy but not in a fake pop sounding way. I wanted to go back to more of the roots of punk rock and pop punk and put a whole new NFG spin on it. The record goes from song to song never letting up the energy." The lead single and title track, "Radiosurgery" was released on August 2. In March 2012, New Found Glory had announced via their website that they would be a part of the Vans Warped Tour lineup. New Found Glory will celebrate the 10th anniversary of Sticks And Stones by going on a small club tour in the fall, all around the country.

In November Pundik said that the band will take a break and will not release a new album until 2014. AbsolutePunk confirmed that the band would be releasing A Very New Found Glory Christmas via cassette tape on December 1, as well as a live album some time in 2013. The band recorded three new songs which are on their upcoming live album Kill It Live released on October 7. Also announced in this period was the departure of founding member and rhythm guitarist Steve Klein, due to him being charged with multiple counts of inappropriate contact with a minor. On their Facebook page the band noted that there had been some disparity in the intended direction progressing forward, and that Steve and the remaining members had experienced insurmountable differences "over the years." On March 2, 2021, it was reported that Steve Klein was convicted of indecent exposure.

=== 2014–2021: Resurrection, Makes Me Sick and Forever + Ever x Infinity ===
On February 25, 2014, the band announced an 11 date UK tour with main support by The Story So Far, stopping in cities around the country including London, Manchester, Birmingham, Liverpool, Cardiff and Leeds. On May 18, the band announced on their Facebook page that they would release a new album in the fall of 2014. They also mentioned that it would be released by Hopeless Records. On May 27, the band announced that they had left Epitaph Records and would be signing to Hopeless Records, where their new album will be released in the fall of 2014. On August 5, they released a new single "Selfless" from the upcoming album Resurrection. The band also filmed a music video to release with the single. On September 9, they released a new single "Ready and Willing" from the upcoming album Resurrection. The band also filmed a music video to release with the single. On October 7, 2014, they released Resurrection. On July 22, 2015, the band announced they would reissue the album on October 8, retitled Resurrection: Ascension. It features two brand new studio tracks, two reworked songs and three acoustic tracks. On the day of announcement, they also rereleased "Vicious Love" featuring Hayley Williams on vocals.

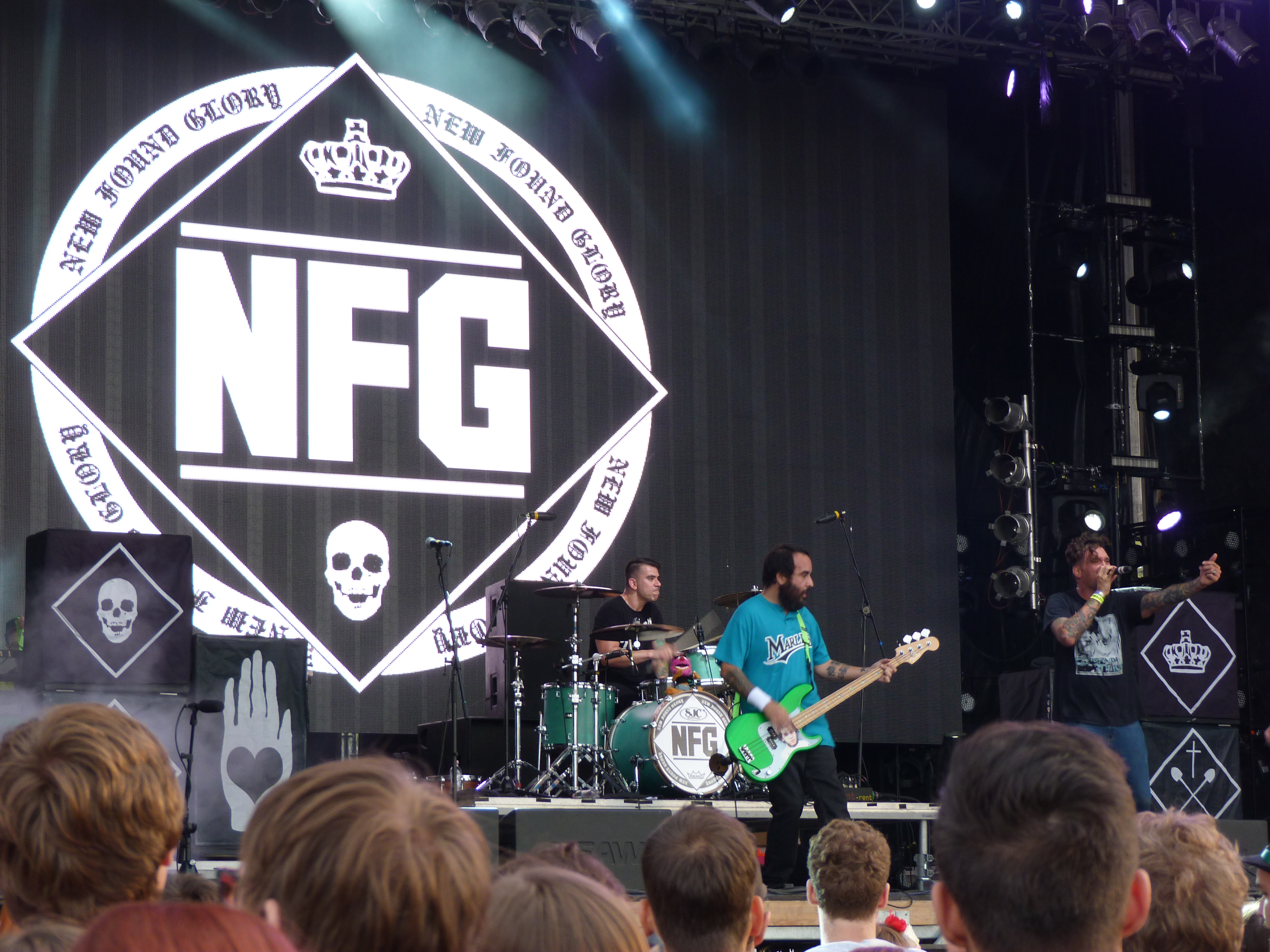
New Found Glory live at Strand Festival in 2015

On September 28, 2016, New Found Glory announced via Facebook that pre-production had officially began for a new album and have since been posting pictures showing the progress of the writing process. On January 25, 2017, the band's next album, Makes Me Sick was announced for release on April 28. The first single "Happy Being Miserable", along with its music video, was released on February 15, 2017. The influence for the music video came from the pie eating scene from the movie Stand By Me.

In January 2019, New Found Glory announced the third installment of their cover series, From the Screen to Your Stereo 3, for release in May. On February 20, 2019, the band released the first song/video off the EP, a cover of "The Power Of Love" by Huey Lewis and the News, which comes from the Back To The Future movies. It was also revealed they'll be covering songs from Frozen, Rocky and Twilight on the new release.

On February 10, 2020, the band announced their eleventh studio album Forever + Ever x Infinity, slated for release for May 29, 2020. The album features 15 songs, as the band did not want to cut any of the recorded material for the album. The first single, "Greatest of All Time", released the same day.

On April 16, 2020, the band confirmed that they had delayed the release of Forever + Ever x Infinity to June 19, 2020, because it would initially be sold exclusively at Target and the band did not want fans to have to go to the store during the COVID-19 pandemic.

In December 2021, the band released December's Here, a collection of 10 original Christmas songs through Hopeless Records. Shortly after this, guitarist Chad Gilbert shared that he had been diagnosed with metastatic pheochromocytoma, a rare form of gland cancer. After two weeks in hospital, surgeons were able to remove the cancer. In January 2022, he was officially cancer free.

=== 2022–present: Make The Most of It, Listen Up! and Gilbert's death ===
In 2022, the band embarked on a full US tour with Four Year Strong and Be Well, celebrating the 20th Anniversary of Sticks and Stones. Stickers were distributed at the merch table announcing their next album: "New Found Glory - Make The Most Of It. A new 14 song acoustic LP by New Found Glory. Featuring 7 brand new songs and 7 classics reimagined. Mixed by Mark Trombino. Coming Soon on Revelation Records." Gilbert had to leave the tour abruptly due to back pains, only to discover that the cancer had regrown in certain parts of his body, including a spine vertebrae which was ultimately removed, and that he would be unable to perform with the band for the rest of the year as a result.

On April 30, 2025, the band signed to Pure Noise Records, while releasing the single "100%". The band's fourteenth studio album, Listen Up!, was released on February 20, 2026. The album was recorded amidst a time of personal struggle for the band, with guitarist Chad Gilbert battling cancer during the writing and recording process.

The band was scheduled to make appearances on three of five legs of the 2026 Vans Warped Tour. However, before their final leg in November could take place, Gilbert died on September 20, 2026, with his family by his side. In the days following Gilbert's death, the band announced that their two scheduled shows that month at EPCOT, in their home state of Florida, would be going ahead as a tribute to Gilbert.

== Side projects and collaborations ==
The International Superheroes of Hardcore is a side project of all members of the band and features Gilbert on vocals and Pundik on guitar, with the remaining members playing the same instruments they play in New Found Glory. All the members use pseudonyms for their characters in the band (e.g. Gilbert is known as Captain Straightedge). The band's songs are humorous in nature with titles such as "Back to the Future" and "Superhero Sellouts". The band also recorded an internet-only music video for "Dig My Own Grave" with director Joseph Pattisall. While not currently active, the band went to Australia in February 2011 for the Soundwave Festival, replacing Sum 41 after frontman Deryck Whibley fell ill with pneumonia for the Melbourne and Adelaide shows. The band did not play the Perth show of the festival, due to Captain Straight Edge himself falling sick too. In an interview in 2012, Ian Grushka and Steve Klein announced that the band had been scrapped.

In April 2008 a compilation from the Punk Goes... series, called Punk Goes Crunk, was released, and features New Found Glory covering "Tennessee", originally by Arrested Development. New Found Glory had previously released another cover song, "Heaven", on Punk Goes Metal.

During "Not Without a Fight" tour, a split EP with Shai Hulud titled Not Without a Heart Once Nourished by Sticks and Stones Within Blood Ill-Tempered Misanthropy Pure Gold Can Stay was exclusively released. There were two colors limited to a total of only 500 copies and only for sale from either Shai Hulud or New Found Glory at these shows.

Dashboard Confessional were to be main support for New Found Glory's headline American tour in 2010. However, shortly before the tour was due to commence, Dashboard withdrew for personal reasons and the tour was subsequently canceled. A split EP, titled Swiss Army Bro-Mance had initially been due for sale on the previously cancelled tour, but was later made available online on a limited pressing of 2,500 copies. The two bands played several acoustic dates in December 2010.

On December 10, 2011, New Found Glory performed a live set for "Guitar Center Sessions" on DirecTV. The episode included an interview with program host, Nic Harcourt.

== Style, influences and legacy ==
New Found Glory are widely recognized for their fast and energetic pop-punk music. The band temporarily moved to an alternative rock style with their album Coming Home in 2006, and is sometimes described as such in general. The aforementioned Coming Home was viewed as a change in direction for the band with its more layered and mid-tempo sound and has been described as a "somber, honest, polished and alternative record." They have also been described as melodic hardcore. The band's traditional sound has been described as "chunky and melodic", with Rolling Stone noting their penchant for "catchy, riffy punk-rock." Consequence of Sound writer Megan Ritt called the band "paragons" of the pop punk genre and noted how "the seasoned Floridian rockers are renowned for their heartfelt guitar anthems." The band's music typically builds upon verse-chorus song structures, combining pop-influenced melodies with fast punk rock tempos, hardcore-tinged breakdowns, and often gang vocals. Their fusion of pop punk with hardcore breakdowns has been labeled as easycore, a genre they are considered to have helped pioneer and named with one of their tours.

Critics have praised the band for their ability to write infectious hooks and the sincerity of their lyrics, often about growing up and relationships. Chad Gilbert has noted that, "if the delivery is honest and real, that's what keeps it from being the corniest thing you've ever heard before. New Found Glory is a band that people enjoy listening to not because we give off this harsh message. We write about who we are and what affects us in life and those are our relationships". Bassist Ian Grushka has stated that "all of the lyrics are based on real life experiences. A song can be created from something one of us is going through or a conversation we've had." While also adding, "We only really talk about personal things that have affected us first-hand, our songs are about emotions rather than some political agenda." Rhythm guitarist Steve Klein was the band's primary lyricist, while lead guitarist Chad Gilbert is the main composer of the songs. Although since the recording of Coming Home, Klein, Pundik and Gilbert all worked on lyrics together. They have recorded covers of The Ramones, Shelter, Lifetime, Gorilla Biscuits, Bing Crosby, Nat King Cole, The Wonders, Limahl, Aerosmith, Cyndi Lauper, Peter Cetera, Bryan Adams, Celine Dion, Sixpence None The Richer, Bob Dylan, When In Rome, Go West, Lisa Loeb, The Cardigans, Goo Goo Dolls, Simple Minds, Yann Tiersen, Madonna, Tears For Fears and Survivor. New Found Glory's influences include Green Day, Texas Is the Reason, Björk, Silverchair, They Might Be Giants, The Get Up Kids, Earth Crisis, Discount, The Promise Ring, Blink-182, Unwritten Law, Britney Spears, The Beatles, Pennywise, NOFX, Bad Religion, Superchunk, Dinosaur Jr., Nirvana, Sparklehorse, Rocket from the Crypt, Descendents, My Bloody Valentine, and Sugar.

In recent years, the band have been cited for their long lasting influence on contemporary pop-punk music. Josh Martin, bassist for band The Wonder Years, has claimed that "Influentially, when you think about the top three pop-punk bands of all time...it's Blink-182, New Found Glory and Green Day. At least in my brain, they're on that level eternally." In 2009, Alternative Press included Nothing Gold Can Stay in their "Classic Albums of '99" feature. Brendan Manley wrote, "Like its title implies, Nothing Gold Can Stay is the sonic transcript of a glorious, fleeting time for NFG - and for pop-punk. But just as gold never loses its luster, it's only fitting that 10 years later, Nothing Gold Can Stay still shines". Likewise, Jason Heller of The A.V. Club reflected how their debut "snuck beneath the radar to become a massive influence on the new millennium's eruption of pop-punk."

The staff of Consequence ranked the band at number 67 on their list of "The 100 Best Pop Punk Bands" in 2019.

== Awards and nominations ==
Award	Year	Nominee(s)	Category	Result	Ref.
MTV Video Music Awards	2004	"All Downhill from Here"	Breakthrough Video	Nominated	
Teen Choice Awards	2004	Themselves	Choice Rock Group	Nominated	

== Band members ==
Current

- Jordan Pundik – lead vocals, occasional rhythm guitar (1997–present)
- Cyrus Bolooki – drums, percussion (1997–present)
- Ian Grushka – bass, occasional backing vocals (1997–present)

Current touring musicians

- Dan O'Connor – rhythm guitar, keyboards, backing vocals (2022, 2023–present)
- David Knox – lead guitar (2023–present; substitute for Chad Gilbert 2023–2026)

Former

- Joe Marino – drums, percussion (1997)
- Steve Klein – rhythm guitar (1997–2013)
- Chad Gilbert – lead guitar, backing vocals (1997–2026); rhythm guitar (2013–2026; his death)

Former touring musicians

- James Dewees – keyboards, synthesizer (2003–2005)
- Michael Bethancourt – keyboards, synthesizer, backing vocals (2007–2012)
- Ryan Key – rhythm guitar, keyboards, backing vocals (2018–2020)
- Will Pugh – rhythm guitar, keyboards, backing vocals (2020, 2025)
- Martin Stewart – rhythm guitar, backing vocals (2021–2023)

Former touring substitutes

- Chris Tsagakis – drums, percussion (2001; substitute for Cyrus Bolooki)
- Anthony Raneri – lead guitar, backing vocals (2010; substitute for Chad Gilbert)
- Mike Ambrose – drums, percussion (2015; substitute for Cyrus Bolooki)
- Kevin Skaff – lead guitar, backing vocals (2023; substitute for Chad Gilbert)
- Zach Comtois – lead guitar (2024–2025; substitute for Chad Gilbert)

== Discography ==
- Nothing Gold Can Stay (1999)
- New Found Glory (2000)
- Sticks and Stones (2002)
- Catalyst (2004)
- Coming Home (2006)
- From the Screen to Your Stereo Part II (2007)
- Not Without a Fight (2009)
- Radiosurgery (2011)
- Resurrection (2014)
- Makes Me Sick (2017)
- Forever + Ever x Infinity (2020)
- December's Here (2021)
- Make The Most Of It (2023)
- Listen Up! (2026)
