= The Story So Far (2002 film) =

- Directed by: Marc "Cheetah" Steinberger, Jonathan Montgomery, Gabriel Beal
- Produced by: Marc "Cheetah" Steinberger, Jonathan Montgomery, Gabriel Beal, Jarett Grushka
- Edited by: Jeffrey Motyll, Jonathan Montgomery, Gabriel Beal
- Distributed by: Universal Music, MCA Records, Drive-Thru Records
- Release date: October 15, 2002
- Running time: 108 minutes

The Story So Far is a documentary film featuring the rock band, New Found Glory.

== Content ==
=== The Story So Far ===
- Opening
- The Beginning 97-99
- Tour Life
- Europe
- Australia
- Recording
- Behind the Scenes
- The Story So Far

=== Videos ===
- Dressed To Kill
- Hit Or Miss
- My Friends Over You
- Head On Collision
- Hit Or Miss (Original Drive-Thru Video)

=== Bonus Content ===
- Bonus NFG Feature, filmed and produced by Fade Front Left Video Magazine (Running time 44:46)
- Drive-Thru Commercial
