= Swiss Army Bro-Mance =

EP by New Found Glory and Dashboard Confessional
- Released: February 1, 2010
- Recorded: September 2009
- Genres: Pop punk, alternative rock, electronica
- Length: 11:55
- Label: Epitaph

New Found Glory chronology
Not Without a Heart... (2009)	Swiss Army Bro-Mance (2010)	2010 Summer Tour (2010)

Dashboard Confessional chronology
Alter the Ending (2009)	Swiss Army Bro-Mance (2010)	Covered and Taped (2017)

Swiss Army Bro-Mance is a limited edition split EP by American rock bands New Found Glory and Dashboard Confessional.

The EP was made available for purchase on February 1, 2010, via Epitaph Records. The tracks were recorded in September 2009 and were initially scheduled to be available at the band's headline shows, which were later cancelled and replaced with an acoustic tour.

New Found Glory cover "The Swiss Army Romance" and "Saints and Sailors" in their trademark fast tempo style, while Dashboard Confessional cover the former's "Better Off Dead" and "All About Her" with significantly different electronic versions.

== Background ==
It was first announced in September 2009 on AbsolutePunk that Dashboard Confessional had been confirmed as the main support for New Found Glory's autumn headline American tour. NFG guitarist Chad Gilbert then hinted the band had been rehearsing Dashboard songs for a possible split vinyl record, which he later confirmed on his Twitter account days later. Gilbert later posted regular studio updates including a video of him recording his guitar lines for the release.

However, shortly before the tour was due to commence, Dashboard Confessional withdrew for personal reasons and the tour was subsequently cancelled. Soon after Chris Carrabba confirmed that as an alternative, a new tour had been arranged which would see both bands perform a series of unplugged shows. The split had initially been due for sale on the previously cancelled tour, but was later made available online on a limited pressing of 2,500 copies .

== Track listing ==
- Tracks 1 & 2 written and composed by Chris Carrabba. Tracks 3 & 4 written and composed by New Found Glory.
1. "The Swiss Army Romance" (New Found Glory) - 2:45
2. "Saints and Sailors" (New Found Glory) - 2:36
3. "Better Off Dead" (Dashboard Confessional) - 3:06
4. "All About Her" (Dashboard Confessional) - 3:27
