= From the Screen to Your Stereo Part II =

Studio album of cover songs by New Found Glory
- Released: September 18, 2007
- Recorded: Rosewood Studios (Tyler, Texas, US)
- Genre: Pop punk
- Length: 34:38
- Label: Drive-Thru
- Producer: New Found Glory

New Found Glory chronology
Coming Home (2006)	From the Screen to Your Stereo Part II (2007)	Hits (2008)

Singles from From the Screen to Your Stereo Part II
- 1. "Kiss Me" Released: September 18, 2007

Professional ratings
Review scores
Source	Rating
AbsolutePunk.net	4.25/5 stars
Alternative Press	3.5/5 stars
Melodic	3/5 stars

From the Screen to Your Stereo Part II is the second cover album by American rock band New Found Glory, and is the follow-up from the EP and first cover album From the Screen to Your Stereo (2000). All the tracks are cover versions of songs from motion picture soundtracks. This is the band's last release through Drive-Thru Records.

In 2019, the band released another album in the series, From the Screen to Your Stereo 3, under the Hopeless label.

== Release and music video for "Kiss Me" ==
From late June to late August, the band went on the Warped Tour, and played at the Reading and Leeds Festivals in the United Kingdom. On August 10, 2007, a cover of the Goo Goo Dolls song "Iris" was posted on the group's Myspace account. On August 17, 2007, a cover of the Sixpence None the Richer song "Kiss Me" was also posted on their Myspace. On August 24, a cover of the Tears for Fears song "Head over Heels" was made available for streaming via Alternative Press. Five days later, a cover of the Madonna song "Crazy for You" was posted online. The music video for "Kiss Me" was posted online on September 5, 2007; a cover of the Go West song "King of Wishful Thinking" premiered through AbsolutePunk four days later.

From the Screen to Your Stereo Part II was made available for streaming through their Myspace on September 14, 2007, and was released through Drive-Thru Records four days later. On the same day, "Kiss Me" was released to radio. In October and November, the band went on a co-headlining tour of the U.S. with Senses Fail. They were supported by Set Your Goals and The Receiving End of Sirens. The band joined Paramore on their tour of the UK in January and February 2008.

=== Music video for "Kiss Me" ===
The music video for New Found Glory's cover version of "Kiss Me" premiered on September 5, 2007, and revolves around a large group of teenagers who construct a tree house out of mattresses, and throw a raucous garden party involving pillow fights and kissing, while the members of the band, along with the members of Paramore, perform the song around them. While the bands perform, a young man, played by drummer Chase Dodds of the band Classic Addict, sets off on a mission to kiss as many girls as possible during the party, keeping a tally on his inner left forearm in black pen. After narrowly avoiding kissing a man (whom he mistakes for a girl because of his long hair), Chase attempts to kiss Paramore's lead singer, Hayley Williams, only to have her recognize the tally on his arm, and slap him in the face, knocking him to the ground. He is then set upon by all the girls he has kissed at the party, who then proceed to strip him of his shirt and tie him to a nearby tree with duct tape. One of the girls tapes his mouth shut, before writing "kiss me" on his chest in black ink. The girls then rejoin the party, leaving Chase tied to the tree.

== Track listing ==
From the Screen to Your Stereo Part II
No.	Title	Writer(s)	Original motion picture	Length
1.	"Kiss Me" (Sixpence None the Richer)	Matthew Slocum	She's All That	2:55
2.	"It Ain't Me Babe" (Bob Dylan)	Bob Dylan	Walk the Line	2:47
3.	"The Promise" (When in Rome)	Clive Farrington; Michael Andrew Nuttal; Andrew Ramsbottom	Napoleon Dynamite	3:40
4.	"King of Wishful Thinking" (Go West)	Peter Cox; Richard Drummie; Martin Page	Pretty Woman	3:40
5.	"Stay (I Missed You)" (Lisa Loeb)	Lisa Loeb	Reality Bites	2:42
6.	"Lovefool" (The Cardigans)	Peter Svensson; Nina Persson	Romeo + Juliet	2:56
7.	"Iris" (Goo Goo Dolls)	John Rzeznik	City of Angels	3:15
8.	"Don't You (Forget About Me)" (Simple Minds)	Keith Forsey; Steve Schiff	The Breakfast Club	4:02
9.	"J'y suis jamais allé" (Yann Tiersen)	Yann Pierre Tiersen	Amélie	1:32
10.	"Crazy for You" (Madonna)	Jon Lind; John Bettis	Vision Quest/13 Going on 30	3:20
11.	"Head Over Heels" (Tears for Fears)	Roland Orzabal; Curt Smith	Donnie Darko	3:29

Japanese/UK/iTunes pre-order bonus track
No.	Title	Writer(s)	Original motion picture	Length
12.	"Hungry Eyes" (Eric Carmen)	John DeNicola; Franke Previte	Dirty Dancing	3:29
Total length:				37:47

== Release history ==
Country	Date
United States	September 18, 2007
United Kingdom	February 4, 2008

== Credits ==
Band

- Jordan Pundik – vocals
- Chad Gilbert – guitar
- Steve Klein – guitar
- Ian Grushka – bass
- Cyrus Bolooki – drums, percussion

Additional musicians

- Michael Bethancourt – keyboards

Guest appearances

- Max Bemis – vocals ("Crazy for You")
- Adam Lazzara – vocals ("Lovefool")
- Lisa Loeb – vocals ("Stay")
- Chris Carrabba – vocals ("The Promise")
- Patrick Stump – vocals ("The King of Wishful Thinking")
- Will Pugh – vocals ("Iris")
- Sherri DuPree – vocals ("It Ain't Me Babe")
- Stacy DuPree – vocals ("Lovefool")

Production

- Paul Miner – engineer, mixing
- Ted Jensen – mastering
- Richard Reines – executive producer, A&R
- Stefanie Reines – executive producer, A&R
- Kristine Ripley – project coordinator, A&R
- Kelly Scott Orr – art direction, design, graphic design
- Boyd Dupree – photography

== Charts ==
Chart (2007–2008)	Peak position
UK Independent Albums (Official Charts)	14
US Billboard 200	42
US Independent Albums (Billboard)	4
US Top Alternative Albums (Billboard)	12
US Top Rock Albums (Billboard)	11

Chart (2025)	Peak position
UK Record Store (OCC)	13
