= Forever + Ever x Infinity =

Studio album by New Found Glory
- Released: June 19, 2020
- Recorded: 2019–2020
- Studios: Castle Recording Studio, Nashville, Tennessee
- Genre: Pop-punk
- Length: 47:57
- Label: Hopeless
- Producer: Steve Evetts

New Found Glory chronology
From the Screen to Your Stereo 3 (2019)	Forever + Ever x Infinity (2020)	December's Here (2021)

Singles from Forever + Ever x Infinity
- 1. "Greatest of All Time" Released: February 10, 2020; 2. "Stay Awhile" Released: July 2, 2020; 3. "Scarier Than Jason Voorhees at a Campfire" Released: October 14, 2020; 4. "The Last Red-Eye" Released: June 18, 2021; 5. "Backseat" Released: July 29, 2021

Forever + Ever x Infinity is the tenth studio album by American rock band New Found Glory, released on June 19, 2020 on Hopeless Records.

A deluxe version of the album re-titled, Forever + Ever x Infinity... and Beyond!!!, was released on September 3, 2021, featuring six further tracks.

== Background and recording ==
The band began work on a new studio album after completing From the Screen to Your Stereo 3 (2019), the band's long-running series of compilation albums where the band records unlikely pop punk cover versions of songs from popular films, such as "Let It Go" from Frozen. The band chose to work with a new music producer than in the past - Steve Evetts - the band had pursued him, appreciating the sound he had created with contemporary punk bands. The band had desired to work with him in the past, but had not had the chance, having been signed to a major record label so early in their career, with Evetts being more of a producer for developing bands.

Guitarist Chad Gilbert expressed difficulty in picking the album's track tracklist; they were certain on which tracks should make the final cut, but uncertain on order.

On July 29, 2021 Gilbert announced a deluxe version of the album, now called "Forever and Ever x Infinity...And Beyond!!!" features 6 new songs and will be released September 3. "The Last Red-Eye", "The Devil Has Many Faces", and "New Abnormal" were all written during the downtime of the pandemic. "Ferris Wheel" and "Backseat" which were ideas that were never completed from the original album sessions and a rework of “Puzzles”.

== Themes and composition ==
Gilbert described the album as "for the fans", noting that it sounded like the material from early in the band's career. Music publication Wall of Sound echoed the sentiment, noting that the album retained the band's earlier themes; pop punk about their feelings on romance and girls. However, the publication also noted a hard edge, and heavier guitar sound than most of their prior work, especially in tracks such as "Shook by Your Shaved Head". The track "Himalaya" was described as having influences of pop punk and hardcore punk.

== Release and promotion ==
The album's release was initially announced in February 2020 as being scheduled for May 29, 2020, at the same time of releasing its first single, "Greatest of All Time". However, due to the COVID-19 pandemic, in April, the band delayed the album to June 19, 2020, Record Store Day, hoping that health concerns would be better by that point. A number of other promotional songs were released ahead of the album's release as well, including "Himalaya" and "Shook by Your Shaved Head".

== Reception ==
Professional ratings
Review scores
Source	Rating
Allmusic	4/5 stars
Chorus.fm	favorable
Exclaim!	8/10
Kerrang!	4/5 stars
Ox-Fanzine	favorable

Wall of Sound gave the album a generally positive review, stating that "New Found Glory do pop punk songs about longing, lust, and love like no other", though conceded that they did little to convince listeners who did like the band prior to the release. Kerrang similarly praised it for being a welcome sense of familiarity in uncertain times of the COVID-19 pandemic, and stated it was their best album in at least a decade.

== Track list ==
No.	Title	Length
1.	"Shook by Your Shaved Head"	2:44
2.	"Greatest of All Time"	2:58
3.	"Double Chin for the Win"	2:39
4.	"Nothing to Say"	2:02
5.	"Stay Awhile"	3:25
6.	"Himalaya"	3:02
7.	"Same Side Sitters"	3:15
8.	"Like I Never Existed"	3:18
9.	"More and More"	4:11
10.	"Do You Want to Settle Down?"	2:41
11.	"The Way You Deserve"	3:50
12.	"Trophy"	2:55
13.	"Scarier Than Jason Voorhees at a Campfire"	2:58
14.	"Birthday Song but Not Really"	2:59
15.	"Slipping Away"	5:15
Total length:		47:57

Deluxe edition
No.	Title	Length
16.	"Backseat"	3:34
17.	"The Devil Has Many Faces"	2:34
18.	"The Last Red-Eye"	3:33
19.	"Ferris Wheel"	2:53
20.	"Puzzles"	3:18
21.	"The New Abnormal"	3:35
Total length:		66:27

== Personnel ==
New Found Glory

- Jordan Pundik – lead vocals
- Chad Gilbert – guitars, backing vocals
- Ian Grushka – bass guitar
- Cyrus Bolooki – drums, percussion

== Charts ==
Chart (2020)	Peak position
Japanese Download Albums (Billboard Japan)	86
Japanese Top Album Sales (Billboard Japan)	70
Scottish Albums (Official Charts)	65
UK Album Sales (OCC)	59
UK Album Downloads (Official Charts)	24
UK Independent Albums (Official Charts)	11
UK Physical Albums (OCC)	83
UK Rock & Metal Albums (Official Charts)	9
US Billboard 200	135
US Independent Albums (Billboard)	17
US Top Alternative Albums (Billboard)	4
US Top Rock Albums (Billboard)	17
