= Jordan Pundik =

American singer (born 1979)

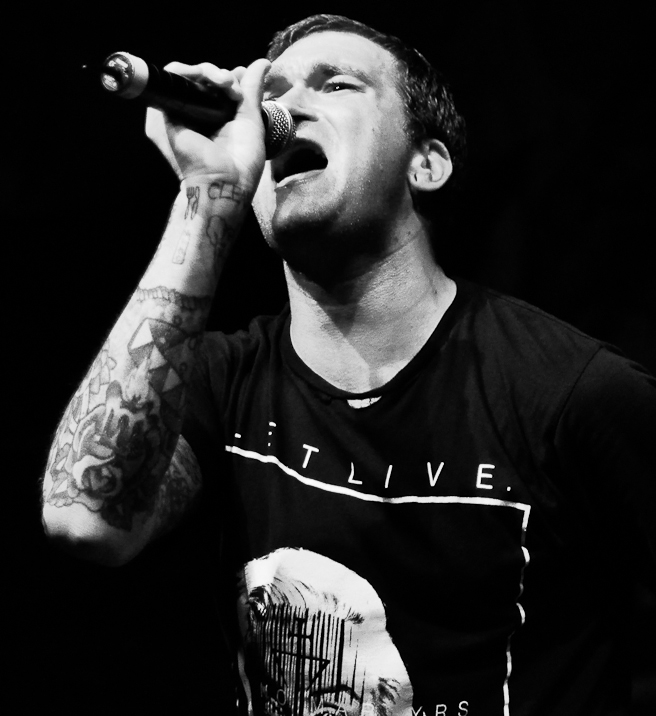
- Pundik performing with New Found Glory in 2012

Background information
- Also known as: Chugga Chugga
- Born: October 12, 1979 (age 46); Englewood, New Jersey, U.S.
- Origin: Coral Springs, Florida, U.S.
- Genres: Pop punk; alternative rock; melodic hardcore; hardcore punk
- Occupations: Singer; songwriter
- Years active: 1997–present
- Member of: New Found Glory
- Formerly of: The International Superheroes of Hardcore; Domestikated
- Website: newfoundglory.com

Jordan Izaak Pundik (born October 12, 1979) is an American singer. He is a founding member and the frontman of Floridian rock band New Found Glory, for whom he sings lead vocals and contributes lyrics. He was also the guitarist in the band's now-defunct side project International Superheroes of Hardcore, where he performed under the pseudonym of "Chugga Chugga".

== Biography ==
Jordan Pundik was born in Englewood, New Jersey, to Carlos and Maureen Pundik. His family moved to Pompano Beach, Florida, when he was 5 years old. He has a brother named Daniel and a sister named Edra. He learned how to play guitar when he was 15 years old. Outside of the band, he is also a tattoo artist.

== Career ==
The origins of the band New Found Glory date back to the summer of 1997 when Pundik met Steve Klein at Marjory Stoneman Douglas High School and the pair began writing music together. Pundik later stated the band name was created whilst he and Klein were working in Red Lobster together. Pundik says, "We came up with A New Found Glory, we wrote it on a napkin. I think we pulled some of it from 'A Newfound Interest in Massachusetts' by the Get Up Kids". They recruited friend Ian Grushka on bass, who they had previously played with in a band named "Inner City Kids". The band practiced in Grushka's garage, and later invited Joe "Taco Joe" Marino to play drums. Shortly thereafter, Chad Gilbert (lead guitar), former vocalist of Shai Hulud, joined to complete the quintet.

In addition to his work with New Found Glory, Pundik has also collaborated with many artists. His vocals also appear on the tracks "Kings of Hollywood" and "You're Not Alone" on MxPx's 2003 release Before Everything & After. He did backup vocals for the song "Cat Like Thief" by Box Car Racer along with Tim Armstrong of Rancid. Jordan also appears on the Hope After the End/A Stab In The Dark split EP with Ned Harrington.

In 2004, he appeared on the Breakdance Vietnam song "Graves of Mistakes" from the album Memories of Better Days, released on Broken Sounds Records. Jordan also contributed vocals on "You're the Wanker, If Anyone Is" by Say Anything alongside bandmate Chad Gilbert. Jordan also contributed vocals on the b-side track titled "The Lost Boys" by Set Your Goals. Jordan is also featured in the band Midtown's music video "Just Rock & Roll". In 2010, Pundik collaborated with Paramore's Hayley Williams and Relient K's Ethan Luck for a punk rock cover of "The Bed Intruder Song".

In 2012, his "suburban punk" band Domestikated (consisting of himself and Relient K's Ethan Luck) released an EP called 5 Minutes in Timeout!. The EP also features a collaboration with Hayley Williams, on the track "What's His Name" (feat. Becca).

== Influences ==
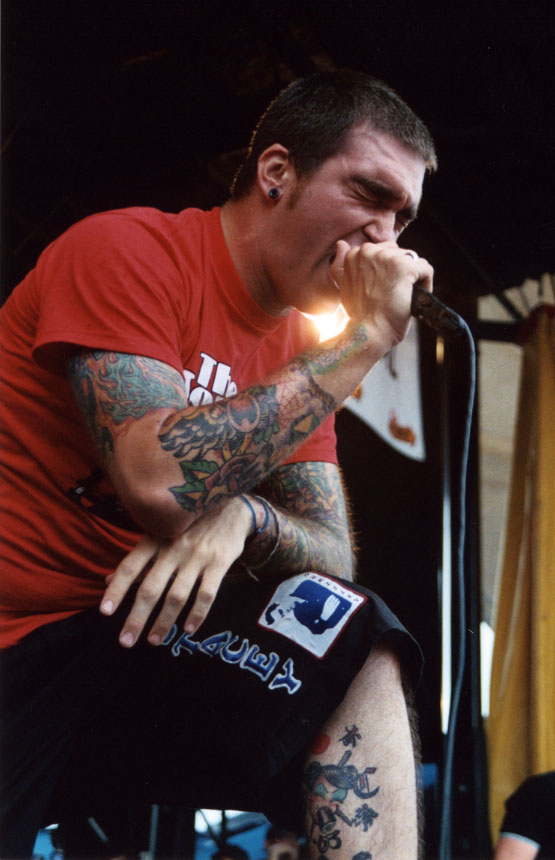
Pundik performing in 2004

Pundik has stated that Nirvana and Green Day are his biggest inspirations.

== Discography ==
with New Found Glory

- 1997: It's All About the Girls (EP)
- 1999: Nothing Gold Can Stay
- 2000: From the Screen to Your Stereo (EP)
- 2000: New Found Glory
- 2002: Sticks and Stones
- 2004: Catalyst
- 2006: Coming Home
- 2007: From the Screen to Your Stereo Part II
- 2008: Hits
- 2008: Tip of the Iceberg (EP)
- 2009: Not Without a Fight
- 2011: Radiosurgery
- 2014: Resurrection
- 2017: Makes Me Sick
- 2019: From the Screen to your Stereo Part III
- 2020: Forever and Ever x Infinity
- 2023: Make The Most Of It
- 2026: Listen Up!

with International Superheroes of Hardcore

- 2008: Tip of the Iceberg
- 2008: HPxHC (EP)

== Record labels ==
with New Found Glory

- Fiddler Records (1997)
- Eulogy Records (1999)
- Drive-Thru Records/Geffen Records (2000–2007)
- Bridge 9 Records (2008–2009)
- Epitaph Records (2009–2014)
- Hopeless Records (2014–2021)
- Revelation Records (2021–2025)
- Pure Noise Records (2025–present)
