= Chad Gilbert =

American musician and record producer (1981–2026)

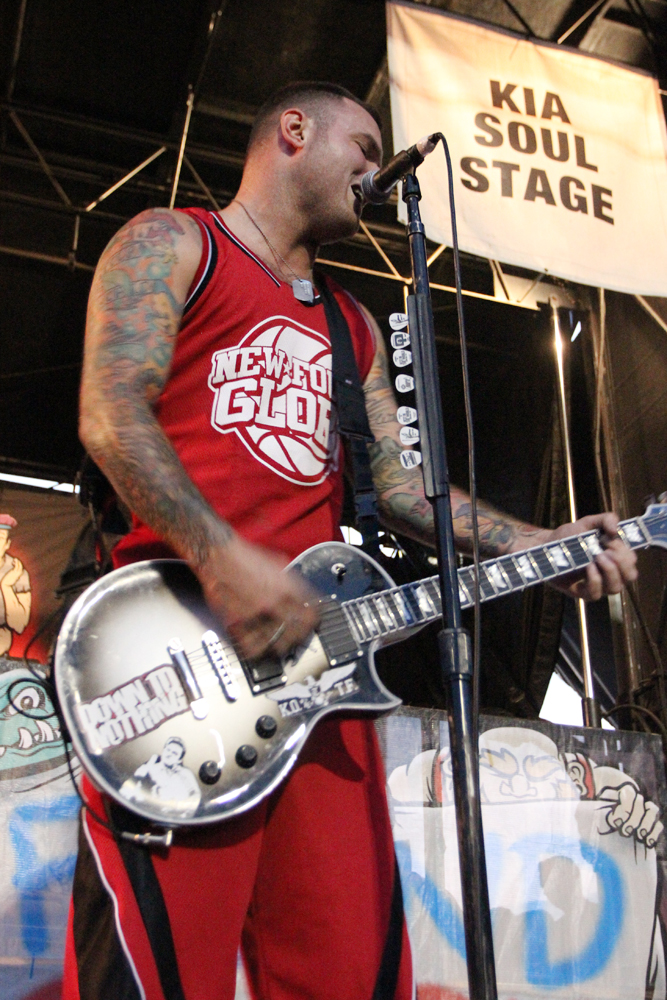
- Gilbert performing with New Found Glory in Scranton, Pennsylvania, in 2012
- Born: Chad Everett Gilbert; March 9, 1981; Coral Springs, Florida, U.S.
- Died: September 20, 2026 (aged 45); Nashville, Tennessee, U.S.
- Occupations: Musician; record producer; songwriter
- Years active: 1995–2026
- Spouses: Sherri DuPree (m. 2007; div. 2007); Hayley Williams (m. 2016; div. 2017); Lisa Cimorelli (m. 2020)
- Children: 1
- Musical career
- Origin: Florida, U.S.
- Genres: Pop-punk; alternative rock; melodic hardcore; metalcore; hardcore punk
- Instruments: Vocals; guitar
- Formerly of: New Found Glory; Record Thieves; What's Eating Gilbert; Allout Helter; Boddicker; Hazen Street; International Superheroes of Hardcore; Morning Again; Shai Hulud; Tension
- Website: whatseatinggilbert.com

Chad Everett Gilbert (March 9, 1981 – September 20, 2026) was an American guitarist, record producer and songwriter. He was a founding member of the punk rock band New Found Glory, for whom he played lead guitar and sang backing vocals. He was also the lead vocalist for the band's now-defunct side-project International Superheroes of Hardcore. Additionally, he was the vocalist for the hardcore punk band Shai Hulud from 1995 to 1998 and 2012 to 2013.

Gilbert produced several records, notably H_{2}O's Nothing to Prove and A Day to Remember's albums Homesick, What Separates Me from You and Common Courtesy. In 2010, he announced he would release solo material online, free of charge, and released several demos and 7" vinyl records under the name What's Eating Gilbert.

== Early life ==
Chad Everett Gilbert was born in Coral Springs, Florida, on March 9, 1981. He attended J. P. Taravella High School, but left after the 11th grade when New Found Glory signed with the California-based record label Drive-Thru Records.

== Personal life ==
Gilbert married Sherri DuPree of the rock band Eisley in February 2007, and they divorced later that year after Gilbert's affair with lead vocalist and keyboardist of Paramore, Hayley Williams.

He married Williams in February 2016, however, after another incident of infidelity on Gilbert's part, they divorced in 2017.

Gilbert married Lisa Cimorelli, member of the all-sisters singing group Cimorelli, on October 3, 2020. They had a daughter born in 2021.

=== Health and death ===
On January 26, 2010, Gilbert reported that "suspicious cells" had been found in his thyroid and that he would have half of it surgically removed. Four days later, he posted on Twitter that the surgery had been a success and no cancer had been found.

On December 5, 2021, Gilbert was hospitalized after his wife found him unresponsive. While hospitalized, he was diagnosed with a pheochromocytoma, a rare and usually benign neuroendocrine tumor. Further diagnostics revealed Gilbert's tumor was malignant and on December 13, 2021 he had surgery to have the malignancy removed. On August 15, 2022, he reported that he had been diagnosed with cancer again and would undergo surgery the next day after a paraganglioma, another type of neuroendocrine tumor, was discovered in his spine. He announced on February 11, 2023, that he would begin intense chemotherapy after doctors found evidence of metastasis to his lungs.

On March 23, 2026, Gilbert said he had undergone emergency brain surgery after three tumors were discovered. In April 2026, he reported that his diagnosis had changed from metastatic pheochromocytoma to stage 4 adrenocortical carcinoma. Gilbert died in his sleep surrounded by his family on September 20, 2026, aged 45.

== Discography ==
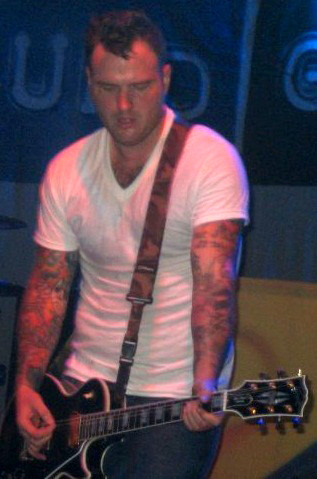
Gilbert performing in 2011

=== With Shai Hulud ===
- A Profound Hatred of Man (1997)
- Hearts Once Nourished with Hope and Compassion (1997)
- Fall of Every Man (split with Indecision, 1998)
- Reach Beyond the Sun (2013)

=== With New Found Glory ===
- Nothing Gold Can Stay (1999)
- New Found Glory (2000)
- Sticks and Stones (2002)
- Catalyst (2004)
- Coming Home (2006)
- Not Without a Fight (2009)
- Radiosurgery (2011)
- Resurrection (2014)
- Makes Me Sick (2017)
- Forever + Ever x Infinity (2020)
- December's Here (2021)
- Make The Most Of It (2023)
- Listen Up! (2026)

=== With International Superheroes of Hardcore ===
- Takin' it Ova! (2008)
- HPxHC (EP) (2008)

=== With What's Eating Gilbert ===
- Dear God (2010)
- Thinkin' Bout Her (2010)
- What I'd Do (2010)
- Nashville Sessions (2012)
- Cheap Shots (2012)
- Solid Gold Hits (compilation of the four previous 7" vinyl EPs) (2013)
- That New Sound You're Looking For (2015)

=== With Hazen Street ===
- Hazen Street (2004)

== Production credits ==
- 2008: H_{2}O – Nothing to Prove
- 2009: A Day to Remember – Homesick
- 2009: Fireworks – All I Have to Offer Is My Own Confusion
- 2010: The Dear & Departed – Chapters
- 2010: Terror – Keepers of the Faith
- 2010: A Day to Remember – What Separates Me from You
- 2011: This Time Next Year – Drop Out of Life
- 2011: Trapped Under Ice – Big Kiss Goodnight
- 2012: Candy Hearts – The Best Ways to Disappear
- 2012: Set Your Goals
- 2012: Shai Hulud – Reach Beyond the Sun
- 2013: Lisa Loeb – No Fairy Tale (album)
- 2013: State Champs – The Finer Things
- 2013: A Day to Remember – Common Courtesy
- 2014: Candy Hearts – All the Ways You Let Me Down
- 2015: H_{2}O – Use Your Voice

== Collaborations ==
- Guest vocals on Fall Out Boy's "I Slept With Someone in Fall Out Boy and All I Got Was This Stupid Song Written About Me"
- Guitar on Fall Out Boy's "The Take Over, the Breaks Over"
- Guest vocals on Throwdown's "The Only Thing" from the album Haymaker
- Guest vocals on Set Your Goals' "Our Ethos: A Legacy to Pass On" from the album This Will Be the Death of Us
- Guest vocals on Say Anything's song "You're the Wanker, If Anyone Is" from the album In Defense of the Genre
- Guest vocals on Madball's song "My Armor" from the album Hardcore Lives

== See also ==
- Category:Song recordings produced by Chad Gilbert
