= Hits (New Found Glory album) =

Greatest hits album by New Found Glory
- Released: March 18, 2008
- Recorded: 1999–2007
- Genre: Pop punk
- Length: 42:18
- Label: Geffen
- Producer: Various

New Found Glory chronology
| From the Screen to Your Stereo Part II (2007) | Hits (2008) | Tip of the Iceberg (2008) |

Professional ratings
Review scores
| Source | Rating |
|---|---|
| Melodic | 4/5 stars |
| Punknews.org | 3/5 stars |

Hits is a compilation album by American pop-punk band New Found Glory, released on March 18, 2008, on Geffen Records.

The album includes eleven of their most famous songs and one b-side. The first track, "Situations", was written for an MTV promotion, but was never used. In June 2007, the band decided to release it through AbsolutePunk.net to promote their appearance on that year's Warped Tour. The booklet contains a written introduction by Chad Gilbert and is filled with photographs from the band's personal archives. The cover art depicts boxer Jack Johnson's defeat of James Jeffries.

== Track listing ==
All tracks are written by New Found Glory.

Hits
| No. | Title | Original album | Length |
|---|---|---|---|
| 1. | "Situations" | Previously unreleased | 3:27 |
| 2. | "Hit or Miss" (The version on this compilation is the recording from New Found Glory) | Nothing Gold Can Stay | 3:23 |
| 3. | "Dressed to Kill" | New Found Glory | 3:29 |
| 4. | "My Friends Over You" | Sticks and Stones | 3:42 |
| 5. | "Head on Collision" | Sticks and Stones | 3:47 |
| 6. | "Understatement" | Sticks and Stones | 3:12 |
| 7. | "All Downhill From Here" | Catalyst | 3:12 |
| 8. | "I Don't Wanna Know" | Catalyst | 3:32 |
| 9. | "Failure's Not Flattering" | Catalyst | 3:55 |
| 10. | "It's Not Your Fault" | Coming Home | 3:38 |
| 11. | "Hold My Hand" | Coming Home | 3:43 |
| 12. | "Constant Static" | Catalyst (B-side) | 3:18 |
| Total length: | | | 42:18 |

Bonus tracks

Japanese bonus tracks
| No. | Title | Original album | Length |
|---|---|---|---|
| 13. | "Over Me" | Coming Home [Best Buy Exclusive Download] | 2:48 |
| 14. | "Truth of My Youth" | Catalyst | 3:03 |
| 15. | "Ex-Miss" | A Santa Cause: It's a Punk Rock Christmas | 3:36 |
| Total length: | | | 51:45 |

== Credits ==
- Jordan Pundik – lead vocals
- Chad Gilbert – backing vocals, lead guitar
- Steve Klein – rhythm guitar, lyrics
- Ian Grushka – bass guitar
- Cyrus Bolooki – drums, percussion

== Charts ==
| Chart (2008) | Peak position |
|---|---|
| Japanese Top Album Sales (Billboard Japan) | 43 |
| US Billboard 200 | 167 |
