= This Disaster: Live in London =

- Directed by: Meiert Avis
- Produced by: Oualid Mouaness
- Edited by: Ken Mowe
- Distributed by: Geffen Records; Drive-Thru Records
- Release date: November 23, 2004
- Running time: 125 minutes

This Disaster: Live in London is New Found Glory's second DVD, and first live DVD. The DVD features a show that they performed at The Forum in London, England, on August 31, 2004, as well as many extras including a behind-the-scenes look on their tours and acoustic radio performances.

The DVD's title is derived from the song "This Disaster" off the band's fourth album, Catalyst (2004). It is most likely that the title was chosen, because in the middle of the band's set the main power to the venue went out.

== Content ==
=== Live at the Forum, London, England ===
What makes this show so unique is that during the show while the band was playing "Dressed to Kill", the main power to the venue went out. As a result, the band could not continue their performance. However, in an effort to keep the show going, the band played two acoustic songs while the power was being restored, namely "My Friends over You" and "I Don't Wanna Know". After finishing the song, the power was restored and the band continued their set as planned, including full band versions of both songs.

==== Setlist ====
All tracks are written by New Found Glory.

This Disaster: Live in London
No.	Title	Length
1.	"Truth Of My Youth"	3:13
2.	"Understatement"	3:11
3.	"2's & 3's"	3:41
4.	"Hit or Miss"	4:13
5.	"Failure's Not Flattering"	3:43
6.	"This Disaster"	3:07
7.	"Something I Call Personality"	3:34
8.	"Better Off Dead"	2:50
9.	"Sonny"	3:42
10.	"Head On Collision"	3:46
11.	"Your Biggest Mistake"	3:17
12.	"It's Been a Summer"	3:46
13.	"Dressed to Kill" (The power goes down about 2:54)	3:22
14.	"I Don't Wanna Know"	3:50
15.	"Forget My Name"	3:07
16.	"My Friends Over You"	4:39
17.	"The Story So Far"	4:29
18.	"Sucker"	3:04
19.	"Intro / All Downhill From Here"	5:04
Total length:		1:09:38

=== This Disaster ===
The cameras filming the concert were not affected by the blackout. Thus, the DVD's second section features a montage of the 45 minute footage of New Found Glory's efforts to continue the show. After a failed attempt to employ a megaphone, Jordan Pundik and James Dewees perform an acoustic version of "My Friends over You", using an already restored microphone and keyboard, and "I Don't Wanna Know", with the addition of Chad Gilbert on acoustic guitar.

1. "My Friends Over You (Acoustic)"
2. "I Don't Wanna Know (Acoustic)"

=== Special Features/Behind the Scenes/Truth of My Youth ===
Following the DVD's main feature are two bonus acoustic songs: A third rendition of "I Don't Wanna Know", performed for UK magazine Kerrang!, and an acoustic performance of "All Downhill from Here", filmed during the Warped Tour 2004.

The behind the scenes chapter comprises a montage of video material, mainly shot during New Found Glory's European tour. It runs 28 minutes and contains, similar to their first home DVD The Story So Far (2002), band members' alter egos, numerous costumes and various shots of on stage footage, ranging from shows in small clubs to giant arenas.

The DVD's last chapter contains a picture gallery rolling to instrumental versions of New Found Glory's "Truth of My Youth", "Your Biggest Mistake", and "Whiskey Rose".
