= Ultra Boogie Highlife =

Ultra-Boogie Highlife

Studio album by Funkghost
- Released: March 31, 2000
- Recorded: 1999
- Genre: Hip-Hop
- Length: 45:17
- Label: slopfunkdust/Grand Extravagant Ent.
- Producer: Funkghost

Ultra-Boogie Highlife is the debut album by American hip-hop artist/producer Funkghost. It was released on March 31, 2000 on his own independent imprint at the time Slopfunkdust Recordings. The album failed commercially (only 20,000 copies were pressed on its initial run back in early 2000) but was praised by critics. The album is now considered a hard-to-find cult classic. The album cover artwork features The Real World: New Orleans former reality TV star Melissa Howard. The LP was reissued digitally in 2009 on Grand Extravagant Ent.

== Track listing ==
1. "Introduction"
2. "Ultra-Boogie Highlife"
3. "The Fabulous..."
4. "U Can Get Down"
5. "Melodic Nectar"
6. "Soul Emporium Suite"
7. "Grand Incredible Sound"
8. "Mic Flam's Midnight Moodiness"
9. "Instructions "S.F.D.P. Anthem""
10. "Flavor Splash!"
11. "3am Deluxe"
12. "Tampa International"
13. "Live and Direct "From The Casbah""
14. "Starshine"
