= Funkghost =

Background information
- Born: Alvin Augustus Harris
- Origin: Tampa, Florida, US
- Genres: Hip hop, rap, R&B, soul, funk, electropop
- Occupations: Rapper, producer
- Years active: 2000–present
- Label: Grand Extravagant Entertainment
- Website: www.funkghost.blogspot.com

Funkghost (born Alvin Augustus Harris on June 26, 1972) is an American hip-hop artist/producer from Tampa, Florida.

== Biography ==
Funkghost was born in Newport News, Virginia, on June 26, 1972. In 1986, his family relocated to Tampa, Florida. After graduation from Bloomingdale High School in 1990, he began performing in and around Tampa's Ybor City commercial district with various bands/DJ's helping form the emerging hip hop scene in the Tampa Bay Area.

== Career ==
Funkghost began his career in the early 1990s as a studio apprentice under the tutelage of keyboard/organ player Edwin Birdsong, who had worked extensively in the 1970s and early 1980s with Jazz Musician Roy Ayers.

In the summer of 1999, Funkghost traveled to New York City and collaborated with Tampa Native Celph Titled who at the time was working as an in-house producer and A&R for the now-defunct BUDS International and Bronx Science Records. They would go on to release Funkghost's 1st 12' single "Instructions" b/w "Tampa International".

In 2000 Funkghost released his debut LP "Ultra Boogie Highlife". The LP was well received by critics Urban Smarts | Entertainment Music but failed commercially. Only 20,000 copies were circulated. Ultra-Boogie Highlife is now considered a hard to find Cult Classic. The album cover for Ultra-Boogie Highlife features a young and (at the time unknown) Real World alumna Melissa Howard. In early 2009 he formed his own independent imprint "Grand Extravagant Entertainment" and released the single and video "The Way I Rock My Clothes" in February 2009. The song was produced by Symbolyc One "S1" who would go on to co-produce Kanye West's 2010 single "Power" a year later. "The Way I Rock My Clothes" was well received by critics and has since garnered mix show airplay on FM stations across the United States. On July 1, 2009, Funkghost released the single and video for "Vintage Futuristic". The song was produced by Australian hip hop producer M-Phazes. "Vintage Futuristic" spawned several remixes and again, was well received by critics. On April 19, 2010, Funkghost released the single and music video for "I'm Your DJ". The song was produced, written, arranged and performed by Funkghost. Although a critical success, "I'm Your DJ" was not a significant commercial success. On September 5, 2010, Funkghost teamed up with music video director Jason Colvin (who directed his "I'm Your DJ" Music Video) and released a short film to his song "As Long As You Rock". The song "As Long As You Rock" again was produced, written, arranged and performed by Funkghost. On October 31, 2014, Funkghost released his second full- length studio album entitled Caviar Taste.

2020–present: Illsboro Records, "Life is how you paint it" LP

In March 2020, Funkghost signed 2 distribution deals with Illsboro Records/Symphonic and Hiphopenterprise based in Antwerp, Belgium. Illsboro – Record label based in Tampa Funkghost – Ultra Boogie Highlife LP In October 2020, Funkghost announced the upcoming release of his 3rd album entitled "Life is how you paint it". The album is slated to be released early 2021 on Illsboro Records/Symphonic. In September 2020, Belgium-based indie label HipHopEnterprise re-issued Funkghost's classic debut LP "Ultra Boogie Highlife" on limited edition collectors vinyl and CD's.

== Personal life ==
Funkghost has two daughters.

== Discography ==
- Ultra Boogie Highlife LP (2000)
- Caviar Taste LP (2014)
