= Hit or Miss (New Found Glory song) =

1999 song by New Found Glory

- Cover used for the New Found Glory US CD single release.

Single by New Found Glory

from the album Nothing Gold Can Stay and New Found Glory
- English title: Hit or Miss (Waited Too Long)
- Released: January 22, 2001
- Recorded: Tapeworm Studios, Miami, Florida (Nothing Gold Can Stay version); Elysian Fields Studios, Boca Raton, Florida (New Found Glory version)
- Genre: Pop-punk; emo; alternative rock; easycore
- Length: 3:15 (Nothing Gold Can Stay version); 3:14 ("Waited Too Long" mix); 3:22 (New Found Glory version)
- Label: Eulogy (Nothing Gold Can Stay version); Drive-Thru; MCA (New Found Glory version)
- Songwriters: Jordan Pundik; Ian Grushka; Chad Gilbert; Cyrus Bolooki; Steve Klein
- Producers: A New Found Glory (Nothing Gold Can Stay version); Jerry Finn ("Waited Too Long" mix); Neal Avron (New Found Glory version)

New Found Glory singles chronology
"Hit or Miss" (2001)	"My Friends Over You" (2002)

Music videos
- "Hit or Miss" first music video on YouTube
- "Hit or Miss" second music video on YouTube

"Hit or Miss" (sometimes subtitled "Waited Too Long") is a song by American rock band New Found Glory. The song was originally from their 1999 debut studio album, Nothing Gold Can Stay. Lead singer Jordan Pundik wrote the song about the frustration of a failing relationship and "waiting by a phone that will never ring".

In 2000, "Hit or Miss" was re-recorded for the band's second studio album, New Found Glory and released as the debut single. Before the official single release, the band worked with producer Jerry Finn. However, they were unhappy with the result and shelved it. The version that became a hit was produced by Neal Avron, who encouraged the band to simplify the drum fills to make the track more "laid back" and radio-friendly.

The re-recorded version was released to modern rock radio stations on January 22, 2001 and charted at number 15 on the Billboard Modern Rock Tracks chart in April 2001 and number 58 on the UK Singles Chart in June 2001. The re-recorded version appeared in the films American Pie 2 and The Benchwarmers. In November 2009, Alternative Press ranked "Hit or Miss" at number 26 on their list of the best 100 singles from the 2000s and in March 2022, Cleveland.com ranked "Hit or Miss" at number 68 on their list of the top 100 pop-punk songs.

== Background and recordings ==
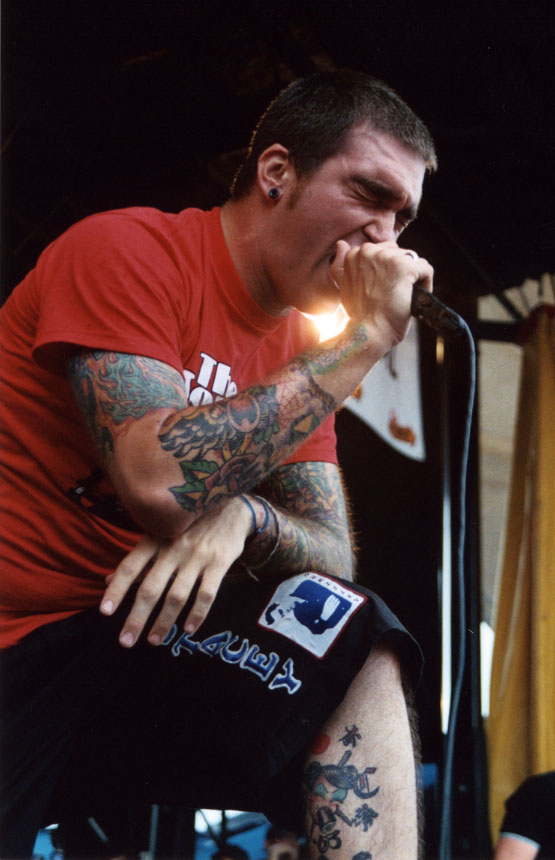
"Hit or Miss" was written after lead singer Jordan Pundik reflected on a past relationship.

Following the band's underground success with the release of debut EP It's All About the Girls (1997), they soon caught the attention of independent label Eulogy Recordings, and the quintet subsequently signed in order to increase distribution of their music. The album was recorded on a low budget with the members having to self-fund the sessions. Vocalist Jordan Pundik recalls, "I was working in Walgreens, I remember borrowing money off my sister to pay for the recording and everybody getting on me for not throwing in enough." Guitarist Chad Gilbert also said that the album "wasn't recorded too well", but also praised its rawness by adding, "It sounds more real than a lot of other records". Pundik worked alongside primary lyricist and rhythm guitarist Steve Klein to pen the tracks. "When me and Steve would work on the songs, he'd come and pick me up in his punk-rock station wagon, with stickers all over the back. It didn't have a stereo, just a boombox. We'd sit in his room at his parents' house, and we'd work on lyrics and melodies with sheets of paper everywhere".

"Hit or Miss" was written after Pundik reflected on a past relationship. The lyrics tell the story of waiting by a phone that will never ring and even reference Michael Jackson's "Thriller". Gilbert said of the song's riff: "Cyrus [Bolooki] came to me and played me the guitar riff...That was the song that really won kids over." The original version of "Hit or Miss" contained a sample from the 1983 film The Outsiders, specifically a dialogue between the characters Johnny Cade and Ponyboy Curtis about a Robert Frost poem. The sample directly references the band's debut album title, Nothing Gold Can Stay.

Following the underground success of debut album Nothing Gold Can Stay (1999), Drive-Thru Records founder Richard Reines had paid Eulogy Recordings $5,000 to license the album and sign the band. Drive-Thru had initially wanted to re-release Nothing Gold Can Stay along with a newly recorded version of "Hit or Miss". Gilbert said of the process, "So we went into the studio with Jerry Finn and recorded it with him. I don't like how it came out, at all. He was such a cool guy, but we were like, 'nah, we don't want to use it'". This "Jerry Finn Mix" was later released as a bonus track on the 10th-anniversary deluxe edition in 2010. The reissue was released in October 19, 1999 and was promoted with a music video for "Hit or Miss".

From June 2000, the band took a six-week break from touring to record an album with producer Neal Avron. Having met him previously, the two parties discussed the desired sound the band were striving for on the record. The band re-recorded "Hit or Miss" again, as they felt the increase in recording budget would help the song. Avron felt that less focus on the drums was better; he would be apprehensive when Bolooki came up with a fill. As a result, most of the drum parts were "kind of more laid back" than what Bolooki had intended.

== Music videos ==
There are two versions of the music video.

The first video was filmed for the 1999 recording of the song on their debut album, Nothing Gold Can Stay and directed by Drive-Thru Records co-owner Richard Reines and featuring actor Corey Feldman as a police officer who pulls the band over.

Around the same time "Hit or Miss" was released to modern rock radio stations, a second, more polished video was shot when the band re-recorded the song for their self-titled major-label debut in 2000 and directed by filmmaking duo Ryan Smith and Frank Borin, also known as Smith n' Borin. The video was shot in Los Angeles, California and featured The Real World New Orleans actress Julie Stoffer. The group invited fans through their website to attend the filming, which resulted in over 1,000 people showing up and being shut down by the Los Angeles County fire marshal. The video was posted online on February 15, 2001. The video shows the band members waking up in a crowded room, leaving a motel, and traveling to a performance venue in Miami. It also features intermittent shots of the band's manager in an office counting money. This version received heavy rotation on music channels such as MTV in March of 2001 and helped propel the band to mainstream fame, with Gilbert telling Alternative Press magazine: “We were just a bunch of kids who grew up in the suburbs. We never expected to leave Florida, we were just making a record we could play locally and sell to friends. Then, eventually, it took us so many other places".

== Charts ==
=== Weekly charts ===
Weekly chart performance for "Hit or Miss"
Chart (2002)	Peak position
US Alternative Airplay (Billboard)	15

== Track listing ==
- CD single
1. "Hit or Miss (Waited Too Long)" – 3:22
2. "So Many Ways" – 2:59
3. "You've Got a Friend in Pennsylvania" – 3:59
4. Hit or Miss (Waited Too Long) – Video

== Personnel ==
The following personnel contributed to New Found Glory:

New Found Glory

- Jordan Pundik – vocals
- Chad Gilbert – guitar
- Steve Klein – guitar
- Ian Grushka – bass guitar
- Cyrus Bolooki – drums

Production

- Neal Avron – producer, recording, mixing
- Chad Milosevich – assistant
- Dan Adams – assistant
- Joe Primeau – assistant
- Bob Ludwig – mastering
