= Julie Stoffer =

American television presenter

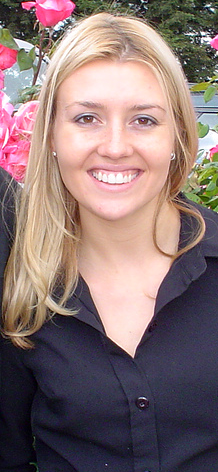
- Stoffer in 2005
- Born: Julie A. Stoffer; 1979 (age 46–47); Provo, Utah, U.S.
- Education: Brigham Young University
- Occupations: Reality show personality Former host of The Electric Playground
- Spouse: Spencer Rogers
- Children: 3

Julie A. Stoffer is an American reality show personality, television host, and property manager. She is best known as a cast member on MTV's reality television series The Real World: New Orleans, the ninth season of The Real World series. Stoffer grew up mostly in Wisconsin, and was attending college at Brigham Young University when she was cast on The Real World, becoming the first Mormon to be featured on the show. She left the church with her husband in 2008 after realizing that her beliefs were no longer aligned with Mormonism and its roots. She identifies as an atheist.

== Early life ==
Julie Stoffer was born in 1979 in Provo, Utah, the oldest of nine children. Growing up, her family moved multiple times, living in Ohio, Illinois, Virginia and ultimately, Wisconsin, where Stoffer spent most of her childhood. She was raised in a Mormon household, and enjoyed activities such as skiing and playing the guitar. She graduated from Kettle Moraine High School and then attended Brigham Young University (BYU), where she studied at the Marriott School of Business.

== On The Real World ==
In 1999, Stoffer was 19, and attending college at BYU when she learned from a front page story in the school's newspaper The Daily Universe, that MTV was casting for an upcoming New Orleans season of its reality television series, The Real World. Though she was not familiar with reality television or MTV, which had been banned on the university's campus, she auditioned on a whim, and was chosen from among 35,000 other people to be on the show. "When I went to L.A., it was just life-changing. I got out there, and I saw a whole new world that I've never seen before," Stoffer said. "I met some really cool people, and I realized, if this experience could be this cool in a couple of days, imagine four months in a new place with new people. I just wanted to meet new people, see new things, see what I wasn't seeing in Provo." Stoffer called the experience "eye-opening." "I saw so much. I learned so much in four months that I've never even known about."

Real World casting directors sought out a "faithful Mormon" when they selected Stoffer. Before filming began, she received a blessing from her bishop that she would be "an example to the world." Despite this, Stoffer was suspended from Brigham Young University in July 2000 for honor code breaches relating to her participation on the program. The school's honor code prohibits unmarried students from living in the same house with unrelated people of the opposite sex, including during breaks away from school. Both Stoffer and her parents, themselves BYU alumni, criticized the manner in which the school suspended Stoffer, on the grounds that the letter with which BYU notified Stoffer of their decision, according to the Stoffers, implied that Stoffer had sexual relations with her male housemates, which Stoffer characterized as "totally false and slanderous." The school gave Stoffer six days to appeal their ruling, and included an outline of actions that Stoffer could take to regain admittance to the school, but as Stoffer was traveling while filming the MTV spinoff series, Real World/Road Rules Challenge, she did not file an appeal, and later stated that she felt no respect for the school or its Honor Code, accusing the institution of assuming, on the basis of a "technical[ity]", that she was guilty of immoral conduct, when the footage shot during her time in the Real World mansion established otherwise.

== Other appearances ==
Following The Real World, Stoffer continued to participate in MTV shows such as the reality competition series Real World/Road Rules Challenge. One of her most infamous moments on the show occurred when she seemingly tried to unhook Veronica Portillo's harness during a zip-lining challenge during The Inferno.

Stoffer appeared in the music video for Eminem's "Without Me", as well as New Found Glory's "Hit or Miss".

Stoffer also later co-hosted G4 Canada's show The Electric Playground, which went behind the scenes of the video game industry.

She also spoke on behalf of Path-U-Find Media, promoting her then-beliefs of moral values and working in abstinence and anti-tobacco campaigns.

Stoffer makes a cameo appearance in the 2002 LDS comedy film The Singles Ward, though she stated in an April 2022 podcast that she was not aware that the film depicted the other characters speaking of her disparagingly.

Stoffer reunited with her Real World castmates on The Real World Homecoming: New Orleans, which premiered on April 20, 2022. During the season premiere, castmates Melissa Beck and Danny Roberts accused Stoffer or her representatives of writing letters defaming Beck and Roberts to colleges and other organizations, in order to better secure speaking engagements for herself. Beck had last made this same accusation of Stoffer on camera during 2002's The Challenge: Battle of the Sexes, which was the last time Beck spoke to Stoffer. Stoffer denied these communications, though she did admit to having written a letter to one event organizer, defending herself by claiming that Roberts, and not her had been "making fun" of children present at an event, when he had found it humorous that they were not recognized. Roberts, however, said the letter portrayed him as a "horrible homosexual", which stunned and hurt him.

In 2023, Julie and her husband Spencer, and their children were featured on HGTV's House Hunters.

== Personal life ==
After filming The Real World and spending time traveling around the world, Stoffer settled in Los Angeles, and subsequently moved to Huntington Beach, California. She learned to play the drums and played music with her bandmates.

On November 4, 2004, Stoffer married ophthalmologist and United States Navy veteran Spencer Rogers at the Salt Lake City Temple. They moved to Oceanside, California, and then to Connecticut, where Rogers worked as a Dive Medical Officer for the U.S. Navy, spurring Stoffer's interest in diving. When the Navy sent Rogers to Europe, they bought their first house on the Thames River, which Stoffer's father James helped build. Stoffer graduated from the University of Connecticut with a degree in Health Sciences and a minor in Scientific Diving. She began diving at the Mystic Aquarium. Stoffer and Rogers have three children. When Rogers was accepted into Yale University for his ophthalmology residency, the couple lived near the campus. Stoffer herself took classes at Yale, studied web design, and became a property manager. After their schooling was completed, they moved to San Luis Obispo, California.

As of 2008, she is no longer a practicing member of The Church of Jesus Christ of Latter-day Saints, after she came to perceive problems with Mormonism, believing it to have roots in systematic racism, sexism, and homophobia. After experimenting with different religious ideas, including paganism, she came to identify as an atheist by 2022.

Stoffer planned to fly standby on an early-morning from Boston to Los Angeles on American Airlines Flight 11 on September 11, 2001, which would later crash into the North Tower of the World Trade Center, but missed the flight due to an argument with her boyfriend. According to Stoffer, her former Real World castmate Melissa Beck was also supposed to fly standby that same morning.
