= Your Biggest Mistake =

Your Biggest Mistake may refer to:

- "Your Biggest Mistake", a song by New Found Glory from the album Catalyst
- "Your Biggest Mistake", a song by Ellie Goulding from the album Lights
