= From the Screen to Your Stereo =

EP of cover songs by A New Found Glory
- Released: March 28, 2000
- Recorded: Early 2000
- Studio: Studio 13, Deerfield Beach, Florida, United States
- Genre: Pop punk
- Length: 18:35
- Label: Drive-Thru
- Producer: Jeremy Staska; New Found Glory

A New Found Glory chronology
Nothing Gold Can Stay (1999)	From the Screen to Your Stereo (2000)	New Found Glory (2000)

Professional ratings
Review scores
Source	Rating
Allmusic	4.5/5 stars

From the Screen to Your Stereo is an EP by New Found Glory (formerly A New Found Glory) released on 28 March 2000 by Drive-Thru Records. All the tracks are covers of songs from motion picture soundtracks. The album was pressed on 10" vinyl and released in three different colors: light marble blue, marble red, and white. The vinyl pressing featured a bonus track. In 2002, the album was released on a non-US split with the Japanese band Nicotine entitled Movie Addiction, on which Nicotine also covered songs from movies. In 2007 the band released a follow-up, this time a full-length album titled From the Screen to Your Stereo Part II.

== Track listing ==
From the Screen to Your Stereo
No.	Title	Writer(s)	Original Motion Picture	Length
1.	"That Thing You Do" (The Wonders)	Adam Schlesinger	That Thing You Do!	1:58
2.	"Never Ending Story Theme Song" (Limahl)	Giorgio Moroder; Keith Forsey	The NeverEnding Story	2:18
3.	"I Don't Want to Miss a Thing" (Aerosmith)	Diane Warren	Armageddon	2:30
4.	"The Goonies 'R' Good Enough" (Cyndi Lauper)	Cyndi Lauper; Stephen Broughton Lunt; Arthur Stead	The Goonies	2:32
5.	"The Glory of Love" (Peter Cetera)	David Foster; Peter Cetera; Diane Nini	The Karate Kid Part II	3:19
6.	"(Everything I Do) I Do It for You" (Bryan Adams)	Bryan Adams; Robert John "Mutt" Lange; Michael Kamen	Robin Hood: Prince of Thieves	2:55
7.	"My Heart Will Go On" (Celine Dion)	James Horner; Will Jennings	Titanic	3:03
8.	"Heaven" (Warrant)		*Vinyl Bonus Track
Total length:				18:35

== Personnel ==
- Jordan Pundik - lead vocals
- Chad Gilbert - lead guitar, vocals
- Steve Klein - rhythm guitar
- Ian Grushka - bass guitar
- Cyrus Bolooki - drums, percussion

== Charts ==
Chart (2002)	Peak position
US Heatseekers Albums (Billboard)	37
