= The Real World Homecoming: New Orleans =

Spin-off miniseries of The Real World

- Season 3
- Starring: Melissa Beck; David "Tokyo" Broom; Jamie Murray; Danny Roberts; Matt Smith; Julie Stoffer; Kelley Wolf
- No. of episodes: 8

Release
- Original network: Paramount+
- Original release: April 20 – June 8, 2022

Season chronology
- ← Previous; The Real World Homecoming: Los Angeles

The Real World Homecoming: New Orleans is the third and final season of the spin-off miniseries of The Real World, that reunited the cast members of the ninth season of the show. It is the first season of Homecoming to include all cast members living in one house, though it joined the other two seasons in having a cast member leaving by choice before the season was officially concluded (Kelley left early in the series finale due to Julie's disturbing actions and concerns about her safety). Multiple cast members have criticized the edit of the episodes for not telling the full story of events and placing events out of order.

== Overview ==
A few months after the first season premiered, The Real World Homecoming was renewed for two more seasons on September 29, 2021, without specifying which cast would be reunited for the third season. Production reportedly had reached out to the San Francisco, Boston, Seattle, and Hawaii casts, and could not agree for each of those casts to reunite (the 4th London-set season was ruled out for a reunion due to the cost and logistical issues involved in having Americans leaving the U.S. to film in a foreign country). On March 31, 2022, it was announced that the third season would premiere on Paramount+ on April 20, 2022.

This season addressed recurring themes of the series including intersectionality and race, sexuality, religion, and a revisiting of the "Don't ask, don't tell" military policy. In May 2022, The New York Times profiled Danny Roberts as an icon for LGBT millennials. At the conclusion of the series, Variety called the series "genius reality TV". Paramount+ cancelled the series in 2022 and removed it from all of their streaming platforms; it has not returned to any of them as of 2026.

== Episodes ==
No. overall	No. in season	Title	Original release date
15	1	"The Real 7"	April 20, 2022
The Real 7 arrive in New Orleans to reunite more than 20 years after their season originally aired. The first to meet are Melissa and Danny, mirroring how the original show began. The next are Kelley and David, who now goes by the name Tokyo. Matt and Jamie soon follow, with Julie being the last to arrive. Bad feelings still linger between Julie and Melissa, leading to some awkward greetings. Promptly after their arrival, the castmates are shown a video package of clips from the original show welcoming them back to New Orleans. When Julie confronts Melissa over not being able to remember visiting each other in Los Angeles, Melissa fires back at Julie over slandering her to the college speaking circuit. This is when Danny reveals that he was slandered by Julie as well, with a particularly homophobic letter that portrayed him as a deviant and a bad role model. Refusing to take accountability for the situation, Julie sequesters herself up in her bedroom while the rest of the roommates enjoy a welcome dinner together. When Julie tries defending herself to Tokyo by putting the blame on her agents at the time, Tokyo explains why she still needs to take responsibility for what happened. Finally seeming to understand, Julie goes to talk with Melissa.
16	2	"Outta Bounds, Part 1"	April 27, 2022
Julie finds Danny outside to apologize to him. He acknowledges Julie's apology, while maintaining that it will take longer than the allotted time of the show to reestablish trust. Later, the castmates are shown a video package about Danny and Paul, highlighting how risky it was for Paul to appear under "Don't ask, don't tell" and how severe the consequences might have been. Danny opens up to the group about his complex PTSD from the show and what came after, where living in fear of discovery created continual trauma. This eventually contributed to the demise of their relationship. Privately, Danny and Kelley discuss how this situation might help him find closure with Paul. The next morning, Julie and Melissa are finally able to talk, with Julie taking responsibility for the situation regardless of how it happened. While Melissa acknowledges the value of the conversation, she is not ready to forgive or become friends with Julie yet. That evening, the castmates are invited to a night out at a drag show, which Matt and Kelley choose to sit out on. After drinking heavily, Julie becomes belligerent, refusing to leave when the others ask. Tokyo's attempts to remove her by force only makes Julie more hostile, storming off into the street alone.
17	3	"Outta Bounds, Part 2"	May 4, 2022
An irate Julie continues to resist leaving the club, but is eventually corralled into a car. Back at the house, Julie falls onto the pavement, runs into a tree, and repeatedly becomes sick as the group does their best to take care of her. Tokyo takes the lead on this by staying up with her. The next morning, Julie wakes up unfazed, to the surprise of her roommates. Sharing about their families and their lives, Danny addresses how his relationship with Paul imploded. Having not seen each other in over 15 years, Danny accepts this opportunity to potentially clear the air with him. Out of nowhere, Julie begins to question her bruises from the night before, and Tokyo's part in them for trying to remove her from the club. A group outing to Café Du Monde becomes uncomfortable when Julie continues to make pointed remarks. Afterwards, Tokyo confronts Julie about her belligerent behavior and the narrative she's creating with her accusations, which does not go well. Paul arrives at the house to see Danny, and the two share an amicable exchange. That night, as most of the roommates are winding down, Julie vents about them over the phone to her husband. She complains that she's the only one here trying to make good television, unaware that she's in earshot of Melissa and Kelley, who are perturbed by all of this. The next morning, Tokyo declares his desire to switch rooms, leaving Julie in a room alone, which troubles her. After he and Melissa discuss complicated layers of racism coming out in the narrative that Julie is creating, Tokyo decides to confront the issue head on by calling a house meeting so they can address the situation.
18	4	"It Shouldn't Be Comfortable, We're Talking About Racism"	May 11, 2022
As Tokyo's house meeting to address her behavior unfolds, Julie seems to misunderstand its intention. When Julie invites the others to pick up the slack of creating interesting drama, Kelley and the others insist that it isn't their responsibility to manufacture television, only to go about their lives. After Julie accuses Melissa of having designs against her, Melissa leaves upset, effectively ending the meeting. Tensions continue to linger after, leaving Julie feeling isolated. The roommates are taken on another swamp tour like the original show, where Melissa was upset by the tour guide casually using a racial slur. This time, Melissa is allowed to just sit back and enjoy herself. Back at the house, the Real 7 watch a video package about the racial issues addressed on their season, and reflect on how they have all evolved since. Melissa laments how her very real concerns about these issues at the time were framed as bothersome, and how audiences responded negatively to her because of that. Julie's attempt to relay her experiences with racism result in her feeling scolded by Tokyo and Melissa, who has been pushed to her own limit with Julie's accusations. Julie finally acknowledging and apologizing for how her antics at the club had racial overtones alleviates a lot of pressure among the group. Afterwards, Melissa makes a point of apologizing to Julie for how forceful her tone became during the conversation. The next day, Melissa surprises everyone with her parents, whose visit on the original show never made it to air.
19	5	"There's Something About Jamie"	May 18, 2022
The Real 7 receive a party package of decorations and costumes to help them reminisce on Y2K and the iconic pop culture from their time on the original show. The next morning, Julie continues to pursue a connection with Jamie. The group watches a video package about Jamie's position in the house as an object of interest for all three women, and how Julie was the only one to make a physical connection with him. While Melissa and Kelley feel it was all in good fun, it clearly meant more to Julie, who expresses a lot of complicated feelings about her sexual identity as it related to her strict religious upbringing. Matt discusses his own religious development, and how it has influenced him as a father and husband. When Melissa surprises the group with a tarot card reader, Matt elects to sit out. The reading highlights a lot of the Real 7's natural strengths, encouraging several to step into leadership roles. That night, the full group reconvenes to play a game matching anonymous quotes from the show's Unmasked companion book to the roommate who said it. While there are some interesting surprises, a quote from Matt calling Danny negative opens old wounds for Danny, who felt Matt treated him uncomfortably at the time for being gay.
20	6	"Spiritual Bypassings"	May 25, 2022
Matt attempts to connect emotionally with Danny, who insists he does not want or need Matt's apologies for the situation. Julie tries explaining Danny's reasoning to Matt, but he continues to struggle, confronting the producers over feeling targeted as the religious roommate. Julie asks Matt about his romantic rejection of her during the original show, prompting Kelley to confide in him after that she's not comfortable rehashing things of that nature, and the two acknowledge how difficult this situation is. She also talks with Matt about his religion and its ability to change. Julie's husband Spencer arrives at the house and the group watches a video package about Julie's religious journey on the show. She reveals for the first time that she and her husband left the LDS Church, and that this televised declaration may have severe consequences not only for them but their families as well. During a park outing, Kelley admits to Danny and Melissa that she isn't sure about staying in the house. Matt and Danny spend time bonding over similar childhood experiences and discuss Danny's personal sense of spirituality. After leaving the house, Spencer begins to panic about Julie's proximity to Jamie, which does little to keep the pair from spending more and more time together.
21	7	"It's Not Regret, It's Reset"	June 1, 2022
Julie tells Danny about her husband's panicked calls that concluded in him giving Julie a "hall pass" for this experience. Danny warns her to be careful managing Spencer's insecurities in this situation. The group reflects on how they may have failed to understand Tokyo's intention with his music for their public access show. When Melissa notes that he went underground after the show, Tokyo replies, "It's not regret, it's reset." After Spencer admits over the phone to some jealousy but says he is not concerned about their marriage, Julie realizes she can't have the sort of friendship she wants with Jamie due to their complicated past. The roommates watch a video package about Kelley and Peter, and how their relationship challenged Kelley's ability to connect with the roommates. Kelley opens up about her complicated history with female friendships, revealing that she was severely bullied in school, including incidents of violence. She and Melissa realize how this crossed wires with Melissa's own insecurities at the time. Following a discussion about Tokyo's music, and how Dave Chapelle's mockery coupled with its viral trajectory in early meme culture deeply affected him, Tokyo decides to lead the group in an all-new recording of "Come On, Be My Baby Tonight". After being shown private photos of Spencer unprompted by a rambunctious Julie, Kelley becomes deeply uncomfortable in the house. Confronting Julie about this, and her desire to now leave early, is not well-received. Bad feelings continue to linger through brunch the next morning, where Kelley hesitates to tell the roommates that she wants to go.
22	8	"Get to the Finish Line"	June 8, 2022
While six of the Real 7 enjoy the Mardi Gras celebration, Kelley takes this opportunity to pack her things. Melissa is touched when a fan asks her to sign an art print of hers from years ago. After the party, Kelley breaks the news that she's leaving. Though disappointed, the group is mostly supportive. While everyone adjusts to the change in their own way, Julie feels responsible for it. The roommates play a game answering randomized questions, leading Tokyo to become more introverted. This frustrates the roommates, who wish to know him and his story better. Melissa and Julie share a moment acknowledging Julie's apology and putting the past behind them. They then work together to try and get to know Tokyo, despite his reluctance. Melissa reminds him that he always has six people in the world who will be there for him, and her most of all. As a last surprise, Melissa arranges with her artist friend Lionel from the original show for the roommates to help paint a street mural, later realizing that it's across from his old art gallery where she showed her paintings over twenty years ago. The project instills a renewed sense of ease in Tokyo, and the roommates return home to do a final group confessional session. On their final morning in the house, the remaining Real 7 reflect on the first time they parted ways. When Tokyo asks the group if they would do the original experience all over again, Danny is the only one who hesitates to answer yes. His roommates affirm their admiration for him and his strength in facing the fallout from the original show, and Danny feels he's more ready now for the spotlight that was put on him than he'd been at the time. The castmates part ways, discussing how they have been able to heal old wounds and form new bonds through this experience. As the last left in the house, Melissa declares that she would still do everything the same exact way because of what it has brought to their lives.

== Reception ==
The season received a nomination in the "Outstanding Reality Program" category at the 34th GLAAD Media Awards.
