= Caviar Taste =

Studio album by Funkghost
- Released: October 31, 2014
- Recorded: 2013–2014
- Genre: Hip hop
- Length: 58:34
- Label: Grand Extravagant Ent.

Caviar Taste is the second full-length studio album by American hip-hop artist/producer Funkghost. The 13-song LP was released on October 31, 2014. on Grand Extravagant Ent.

== Background ==
Principle recording began in the summer of 2013. The album was completed in the spring of 2014. Funkghost revealed that the album would offer a mixture of rap, hip hop, funk, R&B, gospel, electro, and trap reverberations.

== Recording and production ==
The album was executive-produced by Funkghost, with production from Downtown Music, J Breezz, Epik The Dawn, Paul Cabbin, Scott Supreme, O.P. Supa, 2 Fresh, Tweeknology, Scott Styles and Sean Murdz.

== Singles ==
On January 1, 2014, Funkghost released a song titled "YSL Logo". On June 28, 2014 he released another track titled "Never Go 2 Sleep" which featured Rey Fonder.

Funkghost later announced that the album would be released in the Fall of 2014.

== Track listing ==
No.	Title	Writer(s)	Producer(s)	Length
1.	"Swishers/Overdose feat. Fred Nice"	Alvin A. Harris E. Matsulevich J. Horsford D. Wimbley, M. Morales	Downtown Music, J Breezz	6:45
2.	"Never go 2 Sleep feat. Rey Fonder"	A.Harris, J. Council, R. Fonder	Epik The Dawn	4:02
3.	"Talk That feat. Cee Jae"	A.Harris, P. Cabbin, C. Hypolite	Paul Cabbin	3:26
4.	"What You Need ( I Got It )"	A.Harris S. Hussey	Scott Supreme	3:50
5.	"Xtra Fly"	A.Harris, Kanye West, J. Smith, W. Muhammad Jaco, C. Mayfield	Tweeknology	3:07
6.	"YSL Logo"	A.Harris, R. Long	O.P. Supa	3:18
7.	"Dear Lord"	A.Harris, S. Hussey	Scott Supreme	4:10
8.	"Inside and Out"	A.Harris, S. Edwards	2 Fresh	4:08
9.	"End of The World feat. Javon Black"	A.Harris, R. Long	O.P. Supa	3:53
10.	"Rockin Never Stoppin"	A.Harris, E. Matsulevich	Downtown Music	4:40
11.	"Light up the Moon"	A.Harris, S. Styles, A. Armato, T. James, A. Schmallholz	Scott Styles and Sean Murdz	4:19
12.	"Stronger Than Before"	A.Harris, J. Council, P. Moore, W. Robinson, M.Tarplin, R. White	Epik The Dawn	3:34
13.	"Paradise Garage/Tasting it"	A.Harris, E. Matsulevich, K. Fisher, Coro, Tamachan, W. Irvine Jr.	Downtown Music, Paul Cabbin	3:34
Total length:				58:34

Sample credits

- "Swishers/Overdose" samples "Stick’em" by Fat Boys
- "Xtra Fly" samples "Touch the Sky" by Kanye West
- "Light up the Moon" samples "Stars Dance" by Selena Gomez
- "Stronger Than Before" samples “Ain't That Peculiar” by Marvin Gaye
- "Paradise Garage/Tasting it samples" De Ja Vu" by Weldon Irvine" and “Regrets “by TAMAONSEN
