= Tip of the Iceberg (EP) =

EP by New Found Glory
- Released: April 29, 2008
- Genre: Hardcore punk, pop punk
- Length: 12:05
- Label: Bridge 9
- Producer: New Found Glory

New Found Glory chronology
| Hits (2008) | Tip of the Iceberg (2008) | Not Without a Fight (2009) |

Professional ratings
Review scores
| Source | Rating |
|---|---|
| AbsolutePunk | (88%) |
| Allmusic | 3.5/5 stars |
| Alternative Press | 4/5 stars |
| Melodic | 2/5 stars |
| Punknews.org | 3/5 stars |

Tip of the Iceberg is the second EP by American rock band New Found Glory, released on April 29, 2008 through independent label Bridge Nine Records.

The release includes three original tracks and three covers of classic melodic hardcore bands Gorilla Biscuits, Shelter and Lifetime.

== Release ==
On February 23, 2008, Tip of the Iceberg was announced for release in two months' time; alongside this, the track listing for it and the accompanying album from the International Superheroes of Hardcore were posted online. On April 10, 2008, "Tip of the Iceberg" was posted on the band's Myspace profile. A launch show was held on May 19, 2008 at Safari Sam's in Los Angeles, California. That same day, the music video for "Dig My Own Grave" was posted online.

== Track listing ==
All lyrics and music written and composed by New Found Glory; except where noted.

1. "Tip of the Iceberg" — 1:24
2. "Dig My Own Grave" — 2:21
3. "If You Don't Love Me" — 1:55
4. "No Reason Why" (Gorilla Biscuits) — 2:03
5. "Here We Go" (Shelter) — 2:29
6. "Cut the Tension" (Lifetime) — 1:53

Japanese bonus track

7. "Jóga" (Björk) — 4:04

== Personnel ==
Personnel taken from Tip of the Iceberg liner notes.

New Found Glory

- Jordan Pundik – vocals
- Chad Gilbert – guitar
- Steve Klein – guitar
- Ian Grushka – bass
- Cyrus Bolooki – drums

Production

- New Found Glory – production
- Paul Miner – recording

== Charts ==
| Chart (2008) | Peak position |
|---|---|
| Japanese Top Album Sales (Billboard Japan) | 51 |
| UK Compilation Albums (OCC) | 100 |
| US Billboard 200 | 136 |
| US Top Hard Rock Albums (Billboard) | 22 |
