= Danny Roberts (media personality) =

American actor

- Born: July 19, 1977 (age 49); Rockmart, Georgia
- Education: University of Georgia
- Occupations: Actor, recruiter
- Known for: The Real World: New Orleans
- Height: 6 ft 0 in (183 cm)
- Children: 1

Jason Daniel "Danny" Roberts (born July 19, 1977) is a recruiter and television personality best known for appearing on The Real World: New Orleans in 2000.

== Career ==
Roberts graduated from Rockmart High School in 1995. Roberts studied foreign language education while attending the University of Georgia, where he graduated in 1999.

=== Real World ===
Prior to beginning the show, he had recently begun a relationship with Paul Dill, a US Army captain stationed in Vicenza, Italy. Because of the U.S. Military "Don't ask, don't tell" policy toward homosexuals, Dill's face was obscured on TV and much national attention was brought to the issue. In early 2004, MTV aired a special where Dill (then out of the military) revealed his face for the first time and the policy and its effects were discussed. In November 2006, Roberts announced in The Advocate magazine that he and Dill had split up.

=== Post Real World ===
Roberts made a few post-Real World appearances on television such as Dawson's Creek, Netflix's DTLA, and hosted the DVD collection of gay-themed short films, Boy's Briefs.

Roberts spoke at schools across the country on diversity in sexuality, coming out, public policy, and the military's "Don't ask, Don't tell" policy for several years after his first TV appearance in addition to other LGBTQ advocacy work.

After spending 10 years in New York and Seattle, Roberts returned to Atlanta, where he worked in human resource recruiting for an email software company called MailChimp, where he worked from 2014 until 2017. He previously worked as a recruiter for Redfin, a residential real estate company. As of 2017-2018, Roberts was a Senior Talent Recruiter at InVision App, the digital design tool, in Boston.

Roberts currently lives in Grafton, Vermont and is an independent technical startup recruiter as well as consults with an education non-profit called History UnErased, which has developed and distributes the nation's only primary sourced LGBTQ+ history curriculum for K-12. His most recent television work involved a return to his Real World roots as a cast member of The Real World Homecoming: New Orleans, which was released on Paramount+ in 2022.

== Personal life ==
Danny was married to a partner of ten years however they divorced in 2018. Together, they are the co-parents of an adopted daughter, born in 2016.

In 2018, Roberts revealed in an interview with Entertainment Weekly that he was HIV positive since 2011.

== TV appearances ==
- DTLA (2012)
- Reality TV Secrets Revealed (2004)
- MTV News: Out in the Real World (2003)
- Boys Briefs 2 (2002)
- Real World/Road Rules Challenge: Battle of the Seasons (2002)
- Dawson's Creek - Episode: Coming Home (2000) French Exchange Student
- The Real World: New Orleans (2000)
  - The Real World Homecoming: New Orleans (2022)
