= Nothing Gold Can Stay (album) =

Studio album by A New Found Glory
- Released: May 1, 1999
- Studio: Tapeworm Studios, Miami, Florida
- Genre: Pop punk
- Length: 38:05
- Label: Eulogy
- Producer: A New Found Glory

A New Found Glory chronology
It's All About the Girls (1997)	Nothing Gold Can Stay (1999)	From the Screen to Your Stereo (2000)

Nothing Gold Can Stay is the debut studio album by American rock band New Found Glory, released on May 1, 1999, through independent record label Eulogy Recordings. At the time, the band was then named "A New Found Glory", but later dropped the indefinite article "A" due to some fans struggling to find their records in stores. The original pressings of the album contained samplings from several films including Tex (1982), The Outsiders (1983), Weird Science (1985), and That Thing You Do! (1996), as well as Robert Frost's poem "Nothing Gold Can Stay", after which the album is named.

On the strength of the release, Richard Reines, co-founder of Drive-Thru Records, signed the band after paying Eulogy a $5,000 license fee in order to re-release the album on October 19, 1999. Propelled by debut single "Hit or Miss", Nothing Gold Can Stay sold in excess of 300,000 copies. The record was responsible for breaking the band in the United States and has been noted for its influence on contemporary pop punk music.

== Background and recording ==
Following the band's underground success with the release of debut EP It's All About the Girls (1997), they soon caught the attention of independent label Eulogy Recordings, and the quintet subsequently signed in order to increase distribution of their music. The album was recorded on a low budget with the members having to self-fund the sessions. Jordan Pundik recalls, "I was working in Walgreens, I remember borrowing money off my sister to pay for the recording and everybody getting on me for not throwing in enough." Chad Gilbert also said that the album "wasn't recorded too well", but also praised its rawness by adding, "It sounds more real than a lot of other records". Pundik worked alongside primary lyricist and rhythm guitarist Steve Klein to pen the tracks. "When me and Steve would work on the songs, he'd come and pick me up in his punk-rock station wagon, with stickers all over the back. It didn't have a stereo, just a boombox. We'd sit in his room at his parents' house, and we'd work on lyrics and melodies with sheets of paper everywhere". Pundik also said that a five-year relationship during high school inspired the lyrics to "Winter of '95". "I was with her for 5 years, she was the only thing I knew, so that played a big part. I remember listening to a Gameface record on vinyl, but was writing my own lyrics for the song at the same time in my head". Gilbert reflects on the album as "100 percent, without a doubt, the most honest, simple, pure record. We were just a bunch of kids who grew up in the suburbs. We never expected to leave Florida, we were just making a record we could play locally and sell to friends. Then, eventually, it took us so many other places".

== Reception and legacy ==
Professional ratings
Review scores
Source	Rating
AllMusic	4/5 stars
Alternative Press	5/5 stars
College Music Journal	4/5 stars
Kerrang!	4/5 stars
Modern Fix	Favorable
Ox-Fanzine	Favorable
Punknews.org	4.5/5 stars

Upon release in 1999, Nothing Gold Can Stay received positive reviews. Mike DaRonco of AllMusic gave the album a positive four star review. He wrote, "With an abundance of Lifetime/Promise Ring rip-off bands crawling out from under every suburban nook and cranny, A New Found Glory pull out all the right hooks and harmonies. Reminiscing about the days of walking to the beach, holding hands with a loved one and loudly singing Michael Jackson's "Thriller". But, they're also about trying to pick up the pieces of a shattered relationship by writing a song about it. Just sit back, listen, and relate to their heartfelt days of love lost and found." Michael Dabaie of College Music Journal awarded the album a "super" four-star rating. Describing the sound as "abrasive yet extremely catchy" he also opined that the album was "pop-punk with substance and a stiff backbone."

A decade after the album's release, Brendan Manley of Alternative Press covered the album in two separate articles for the magazine. Discussing the album in the "10 Classic Albums of '99" feature, he wrote, "Like its title implies, Nothing Gold Can Stay is the sonic transcript of a glorious, fleeting time for NFG, and for pop-punk. But just as gold never loses its luster, it's only fitting that 10 years later, Nothing Gold Can Stay still shines". Later, during a separate article covering the band's history, Manley noted their lasting influence on modern pop-punk music; "New Found Glory are still at the forefront of the scene they helped create". Gabe Saporta of Midtown also said of Nothing Gold Can Stay; "The record has so many little quirks - so many things that made you feel like [NFG] were friends of yours, who were fucking around in the studio and happened to create something magical". Also, when Jared Logan was producing Fall Out Boy's debut album, he asked bassist Pete Wentz what sound the band desired for recording. Wentz responded by "handing over the first two New Found Glory records".

== Track listing ==
All lyrics written by Steve Klein and Jordan Pundik; music composed by New Found Glory.

No.	Title	Length
1.	"Hit or Miss"	3:15
2.	"It Never Snows in Florida"	2:48
3.	"3rd and Long"	2:46
4.	"You've Got a Friend in Pennsylvania"	4:00
5.	"The Blue Stare"	2:36
6.	"2's + 3's"	3:48
7.	"Tell Tale Heart"	3:18
8.	"Winter of '95"	2:30
9.	"Passing Time"	2:58
10.	"Broken Sound"	2:19
11.	"Never Sometimes"	2:51
12.	"The Goodbye Song"	3:56
Total length:		38:05

== Personnel ==
The following people contributed to Nothing Gold Can Stay:

New Found Glory

- Jordan Pundik – vocals
- Chad Gilbert – guitar
- Steve Klein – guitar
- Ian Grushka – bass guitar
- Cyrus Bolooki – drums

Additional musicians

- Chris Carrabba – backing vocals
- The Boofins on the Side Crew – backing vocals
- Marisa Browne – piano ("Broken Sound", "The Goodbye Song")

Production

- A New Found Glory – producer, recording
- Jeremy Du Bois – engineering
