= All Downhill from Here =

Single by New Found Glory

from the album Catalyst
- Released: March 22, 2004
- Recorded: Royaltone Studios, Sunset Sound Studios
- Genre: Pop-punk
- Length: 3:14
- Label: Geffen, Drive-Thru
- Songwriters: Chad Gilbert, Steve Klein
- Producer: Neal Avron

New Found Glory singles chronology
"Head on Collision" (2002)	"All Downhill from Here" (2004)	"Truth of My Youth" (2004)

"All Downhill from Here" is a song by New Found Glory, released as the first single from their fourth studio album, Catalyst. It was released to radio on April 6, 2004. It peaked at number 11 on Billboard's Modern Rock Tracks chart. It was their last of four singles to chart in the US.

== Music video ==
The music video for the song was created in cooperation with a group of French animators who worked on creating a unique environment of creatures. The video was co-directed by the animation team and Meiert Avis. In the video, the creatures are seen building a structure. The band is featured in the video on a platform playing while gradually rising. As they continue to rise, they eventually reach a representation of heaven before the platform drops. A creature runs through some of the supports and the structure collapses.

When the video for this song aired on MTV's Total Request Live, fans voted it on the show fifty days in a row, eventually leading to the video's retirement on the program.

== Charts ==
=== Weekly charts ===
Weekly chart performance for "All Downhill from Here"
Chart (2004)	Peak position
Scotland Singles (OCC)	59
UK Singles (OCC)	58
UK Rock & Metal (OCC)	5
US Alternative Airplay (Billboard)	11

=== Year-end charts ===
Year-end chart performance for "All Downhill from Here"
Chart (2004)	Position
US Modern Rock Tracks (Billboard)	62

== Track listing ==
The enhanced version of this single features four tracks.

1. "All Downhill from Here"
2. "Broken Sound" (radio session)
3. "The Minute I Met You"
4. "All Downhill from Here" (CD-ROM track)
