= Sticks and Stones (New Found Glory album) =

Studio album by New Found Glory
- Released: June 11, 2002
- Recorded: February 2002
- Studios: DML (San Diego); Signature Sound (San Diego); Larrabee (West Hollywood); NRG (North Hollywood)
- Genre: Pop-punk
- Length: 40:03
- Labels: Drive-Thru; MCA
- Producer: Neal Avron

New Found Glory chronology
| New Found Glory (2000) | Sticks and Stones (2002) | Catalyst (2004) |

Singles from Sticks and Stones
- 1. "My Friends Over You" Released: 2002; 2. "Head on Collision" Released: November 26, 2002

Sticks and Stones is the third studio album by American rock band New Found Glory. The album was recorded in February 2002 after the band relocated from Florida to San Diego, California and producer Neal Avron, who had previously produced the band's self-titled major-label debut album, returned to produce the album. Released on June 11, 2002 through Drive-Thru Records and MCA Records, Sticks and Stones peaked at number four on the Billboard 200 chart. The record spawned two singles: "My Friends Over You" and "Head on Collision".

Following the success of the album, the band headlined the 2002 Warped Tour and later saw the album certified gold by the Recording Industry Association of America (RIAA). The album was later certified platinum in 2020.

== Background ==
New Found Glory released their self-titled second album in September 2000 as a joint release between MCA and Drive-Thru Records. MCA had a distribution deal that allowed them to acquire Drive-Thru Records' bands over a period of time. Lead single "Hit or Miss" received heavy airplay rotation from the US's biggest rock radio stations. By April 2001, the band had been moved to MCA. Shortly after this, guitarist Chad Gilbert moved to Los Angeles, California, while the rest of the band moved to San Diego, close to their manager and their label. Appearing on the Warped Tour and featuring in the film American Pie 2 (2001) helped increase the band's profile.

Blink-182 bassist Mark Hoppus was highly impressed by New Found Glory's self-titled album, going as far as to champion them in an issue of Rolling Stone. They eventually supported Blink-182 on their summer tour. Blink-182's manager Rick DeVoe met New Found Glory, and soon afterwards, began managing them. By September 2001, the group were making plans to release a new album by mid-2002. At the end of the year, bassist Ian Grushka got married. He was unable to go on a honeymoon due to their record label paying for a bus to transport the band from Florida to California two days later. The group set up residence in apartments in La Jolla, a community within San Diego, California, for the next three months.

== Production ==
In February 2002, the band began recording with Neal Avron, who acted as producer. Sessions took place at DML and Signature Sound Studios in San Diego, California, Larrabee West Studios in West Hollywood, California, and NRG Studios in North Hollywood, California. He was assisted by engineers Sam Bukas, Mike Harris, Juan Jose Ayala, Ted Regier and Mark Kiczula. For the group's self-titled, Avron wanted a laidback approach for the drums. For Sticks and Stones, he had more confidence in letting drummer Cyrus Bolooki play what he wanted. Bolooki tracked his parts with the tom on his left side. He started playing with this set up while on tour with Fenix TX, whose drummer had a tom and China cymbal on his left side. Bolooki liked the setup, but thought he wouldn't be able to use it as he was right-handed. After setting up his kit in that manner, he found it easier for certain parts.

Several members of contemporary bands contributed to the recordings: Rusty Pistachio and Toby Morse of H_{2}O (backing vocals on "Understatement"), Mark Hoppus of Blink-182 (bass on "Something I Call Personality"), Bane and What Feeds the Fire (backing vocals on "Something I Call Personality" and "Belated"), and Matt Skiba and Dan Andriano of Alkaline Trio (backing vocals on "Forget My Name"). In addition, Chris Georggin of the group's management team Rick DeVoe Management added backing vocals on "Something I Call Personality". Hoppus was initially brought in to add vocals, but after Grushka was unable to do bass for "Something I Call Personality", Hoppus did it instead. Jay Baumgardner mixed the recordings, before they were mastered by Tom Baker at Precision Mastering in Hollywood.

== Composition ==
Gilbert would typically write rough ideas and then jam them out with the rest of the band. After a while, guitarist Steve Klein would take the instrumental and begin adding lyrics to it. Klein and vocalist Jordan Pundik would work on the melody, before sharing it with the rest of the group. Bolooki, who initially started out as a guitarist, contributed a few ideas that Gilbert or Klein would build a whole song around. According to Klein, they attempted to move away from lyrical nature of their self-titled, on which, every song was about girls. He added that since becoming a full-time touring act, it was difficult for them to maintain relationships, which had an influence on the lyrics. Musically, it retains the pop punk sound found on the self-titled, drawing comparison to Green Day. It incorporated new elements to the group's sound, such as hardcore punk-influenced breakdowns. Avron said the group experimented with different tempos, specifically naming "Sonny" and "Head on Collision".

Discussing the album's title, Gilbert said Sticks and Stones "fit[ted] perfectly with the sound of the record and what a lot of the lyrics are about". The group wanted a track that would match the popularity of "Hit or Miss"; they came up with "My Friends Over You". It was the last song written for the album, and evolved from a sole riff to a full song within a day or two. It talks about a guy going out with a girl, who hates his friends. She wanted to take their relationship the next step, but due to past experiences, the guy picks his friends over her. "Sonny" sees Pundik discuss the death of his grandad. "Head on Collision" is about someone you continually get into arguments with, and feeling that you're at a loss as a result. "Singled Out" opens with an electro intro, and features Gilbert screaming in the manner that he did while he fronted hardcore band Shai Hulud. The opening two snare hits that begin "The Story So Far" were done by Grushka. Similarly, the four bass notes that follow were done by Bolooki.

== Release ==
On March 13, 2002, Sticks and Stones was announced for release in June. In March and April, the group went on a tour of Australia. On April 12, the album's artwork was revealed. It features a boy and a girl fighting. Klein explained that when the band was younger, their relationships with girls were "a lot easier. You could hit each other and it would be fun. And I think as you get older everything gets a little more serious. When you have an argument with a girl it can actually break your heart or ruin your life." Following this, the band performed at Skate and Surf Fest. Sticks and Stones was released on June 11 through MCA and Drive-Thru Records. The UK edition, which was released a week later, includes the bonus tracks "Anniversary", "Forget Everything" an acoustic version of "The Story So Far". Between late June and mid-August, the group went on the Warped Tour. On July 9, the band appeared on The Tonight Show with Jay Leno.

On July 16, a music video was filmed for "Head on Collision" on the Universal Studios backlot. The video, directed by the Malloys, features the band on a 1930s movie set. While the video progresses, the group realize they are on the wrong film set, before taking the stage and beginning to perform. On August 27, "My Friends Over You" was released as a single. While the track was doing well at radio, the president of the group's label stopped funding the track, and decided to reinvest the money in Shaggy. In September, the band performed at the Inland Invasion festival, and appeared on Total Request Live and The Late Late Show. In October and November, the band went on tour across the US alongside Something Corporate, Finch and Further Seems Forever. On November 12, the band performed on Last Call with Carson Daly.

On November 26, "Head on Collision" was released as a single. On the same day, Sticks and Stones was reissued with an extra CD consisting of the group's contemporaries. In December, the band performed at KROQ-FM's Almost Acoustic Christmas festival. In January 2003, the group went on a tour of Japan with Good Charlotte and the Starting Line. On April 7, a music video for "Understatement" was posted online. Between April and June, they co-headlined the Honda Civic Tour with Good Charlotte. First half the tour was supported by Less Than Jake, with MxPx supporting the second half. In August, the band played the Summer Sonic Festival in Japan, before supporting Sum 41 on their headlining Australian tour. To coincide with the Australian shows, the album was reissued in that territory with a bonus disc. It included radio performances of "Head on Collision" and "Something I Call Personality", and music videos for "Head on Collision" and "Understatement".

== Reception and legacy ==
Professional ratings
Review scores
| Source | Rating |
|---|---|
| AllMusic | 3/5 stars |
| Alternative Press | 8/10 |
| Chart Attack | Unfavorable |
| Kerrang! | 4/5 stars |
| Melodic | 1.5/5 stars |
| The Morning Call | Unfavorable |
| NME | 7/10 |
| PopMatters | Unfavorable |
| Rolling Stone | 2/5 stars |
| Ultimate Guitar | 10/10 |

Sticks and Stones charted at number four on the Billboard 200, after selling 91,000 copies in its first week. On July 30, 2020, the album was certified platinum by the Recording Industry Association of America (RIAA) for combined sales and album-equivalent units of over one million units in the United States.

The group celebrated the album's 10th anniversary by playing it in its entirety on two separate US tours, one in 2012 and the other in 2013. They played it in its entirety again on a tour in 2017 to celebrate the 20th anniversary since they formed. Cassie Whitt of Alternative Press said "Understatement", "My Friends Over You" and "Head on Collision" had become "staples across a couple generations of pop-punk fans—and bands, too." All Time Low and the Story So Far took their name from songs on the album, "Head on Collision" and "The Story So Far" respectively. In 2016, Gilbert ranked Sticks and Stones as his fourth favorite New Found Glory album. Cleveland.com ranked "My Friends Over You" at number 12 on their list of the top 100 pop-punk songs. Alternative Press ranked "My Friends Over You" at number 32 on their list of the best 100 singles from the 2000s.

=== Accolades ===
Accolades for Sticks and Stones
| Publication | Country | Accolade | Year | Rank |
|---|---|---|---|---|
| BuzzFeed | United States | 36 Pop Punk Albums You Need To Hear Before You F——ing Die | 2014 | 11 |
| Rock Sound | United Kingdom | The 51 Most Essential Pop Punk Albums of All Time | 2014 | 9 |
| Kerrang! | United Kingdom | 51 Greatest Pop Punk Albums Ever | 2015 | 3 |

== Track listing ==
All songs written by New Found Glory.

| No. | Title | Length |
|---|---|---|
| 1. | "Understatement" | 3:11 |
| 2. | "My Friends Over You" | 3:40 |
| 3. | "Sonny" | 3:28 |
| 4. | "Something I Call Personality" | 2:40 |
| 5. | "Head on Collision" | 3:47 |
| 6. | "It's Been a Summer" | 3:33 |
| 7. | "Forget My Name" | 3:10 |
| 8. | "Never Give Up" | 3:12 |
| 9. | "The Great Houdini" | 2:47 |
| 10. | "Singled Out" | 3:20 |
| 11. | "Belated" | 3:06 |
| 12. | "The Story So Far" | 4:09 |
| Total length: | | 40:03 |

- Some editions include the hidden track "The Toothpick Song" after track 12

Bonus tracks
| No. | Title | Length |
|---|---|---|
| 13. | "Anniversary" | 2:51 |
| 14. | "Forget Everything" | 2:32 |
| 15. | "The Story So Far" (acoustic; includes the hidden track "The Toothpick Song") | 27:09 |

== Personnel ==
Personnel per booklet.

New Found Glory

- Jordan Pundik – lead vocals
- Chad Gilbert – lead guitar
- Ian Grushka – bass guitar
- Steve Klein – rhythm guitar
- Cyrus Bolooki – drums

Additional musicians

- Rusty Pistachio – backing vocals (track 1)
- Toby Morse – backing vocals (track 1)
- Mark Hoppus – bass (track 4)
- Chris Georggin – backing vocals (track 4)
- Bane – backing vocals (tracks 4 and 10)
- What Feeds the Fire – backing vocals (tracks 4 and 10)
- Matt Skiba – backing vocals (track 7)
- Dan Andriano – backing vocals (track 7)

Production

- Neal Avron – producer, recording
- Jay Baumgardner – mixing
- Sean Bukas – assistant engineer
- Mike Harris – assistant engineer
- Juan Jose Ayala – assistant engineer
- Ted Regier – assistant engineer
- Mark Kiczula – assistant engineer
- Tom Baker – mastering
- Tim Stedman – art direction, design
- Marco Orozco – design
- Justin Stephens – photography

== Charts ==
=== Weekly charts ===
Weekly chart performance for Sticks and Stones
| Chart (2002) | Peak position |
|---|---|
| Australian Albums (ARIA) | 33 |
| Canadian Albums (Nielsen SoundScan) | 21 |
| Europe (European Top 100 Albums) | 30 |
| French Albums (SNEP) | 100 |
| Irish Albums (IRMA) | 61 |
| Japanese Albums (Oricon) | 24 |
| Scottish Albums (Official Charts) | 20 |
| UK Albums (Official Charts) | 10 |
| UK Rock & Metal Albums (Official Charts) | 2 |
| US Billboard 200 | 4 |

=== Year-end charts ===
Year-end chart performance for Sticks and Stones
| Chart (2002) | Position |
|---|---|
| Canadian Albums (Nielsen SoundScan) | 188 |
| Canadian Alternative Albums (Nielsen SoundScan) | 60 |
| US Billboard 200 | 157 |

== Certifications ==
Certifications and sales for Sticks and Stones
| Region | Certification | Certified units/sales |
|---|---|---|
| Canada (Music Canada) | Gold | 50,000^{^} |
| Japan (RIAJ) | Gold | 100,000^{^} |
| United Kingdom (BPI) | Silver | 60,000^{*} |
| United States (RIAA) | Platinum | 1,000,000^{‡} |
^{*} Sales figures based on certification alone.^{^} Shipments figures based on certification alone.^{‡} Sales+streaming figures based on certification alone.
