= Girls Behaving Badly =

- Country of origin: United States
- Original language: English

Production
- Running time: 25 minutes
- Production companies: Zoo Productions; Sony Pictures Television

Original release
- Network: Oxygen
- Release: 2002 – 2005

Girls Behaving Badly is an American reality comedy television show that aired on the Oxygen cable channel, and was also syndicated to television stations across the United States and Canada by Sony Pictures Television.

The show, described by the channel as "Sex and the City meets Candid Camera", presents a group of women playing pranks on unsuspecting victims.

== Cast ==
- Chelsea Handler
- Melissa Howard
- Shondrella Avery
- Kira Soltanovich
- Candy Ford
- Victoria Schweizer
- Laura DeDona

=== Male cast ===
- Ken Jeong
- Nathan Van Dyke
- David Fisher
- Nick Rish

== Home media ==
The show was released as volumes instead of seasons. Volume One was released on December 26, 2006. Volume Two was released on September 25, 2007.
