= It's All About the Girls =

EP by A New Found Glory
- Released: December 20, 1997
- Recorded: June 1997 at Wisner Productions and Ridenour Studios; Miami, Florida
- Genre: Pop punk
- Length: 29:06
- Label: Fiddler
- Producer: James Wisner, A New Found Glory

A New Found Glory chronology
| It's All About the Girls (1997) | Nothing Gold Can Stay (1999) |

Re-release Cover

It's All About the Girls is the debut EP by New Found Glory (formerly A New Found Glory) released on December 20, 1997, by Fiddler Records. It is the only release with their original drummer Joe Marino. A re-release, featuring revised cover artwork, was issued by Fiddler in June, 2000.

== Track listing ==
All songs written and composed by New Found Glory

1. "Shadow" – 2:32
2. "My Solution" – 3:20
3. "Scraped Knees" – 3:56
4. "JB" – 3:56
5. "Standstill" – 15:17
  - includes an untitled hidden track

== Personnel ==
Personnel taken from It’s All About the Girls liner notes.

A New Found Glory

- Jordan Pundik – vocals
- Chad Gilbert – lead guitar, backing vocals
- Steve Klein – rhythm guitar, backing vocals
- Ian Grushka – bass guitar, backing vocals

* Cyrus Bolooki (credited as a member but does not perform)

Additional performers

- Brian "No Regrets" Gilbert – backing vocals
- Joe Marino – drums

Production

- A New Found Glory – production
- James Wisner – production, recording
- Carlos Paucar – mastering
