= My Friends Over You =

Single by New Found Glory

from the album Sticks and Stones
- Released: 2002
- Genre: Pop-punk; emo
- Length: 3:42
- Label: Drive-Thru; MCA
- Songwriter: New Found Glory
- Producer: Neal Avron

New Found Glory singles chronology
"Hit or Miss" (2001)	"My Friends Over You" (2002)	"Head on Collision" (2002)

"My Friends Over You" is a song by American rock band New Found Glory. It was released in July 2002 as the lead single from the group's third studio album, Sticks and Stones (2002). In the US, the song charted at number 85 on the Billboard Hot 100, the band's highest and only charting single on the chart, and number 5 on the Modern Rock Tracks chart. In the UK, it reached number 30.

== Background ==
"My Friends Over You" is credited to all five members of the band: Jordan Pundik (vocals), Chad Gilbert (guitar), Ian Grushka (bass guitar), Steve Klein (rhythm guitar), Cyrus Bolooki (drums). The group had nearly completed recording their third album, Sticks and Stones, before deciding to develop a song that might match the popularity of their previous biggest single, "Hit or Miss". It was the last song written for the album, and evolved from a sole riff to a full song within a day or two. The song lyrically revolves around a relationship where one partner chooses their close friends over romance. "You're with a girl and she wants to take that next step. And though you think the girl's awesome and you're having so much fun with her, because of experiences in the past with other relationships and things that are going on in your life at the current time, you're just not ready to make that step," said Gilbert. Jon Wiederhorn at MTV described the storyline as "angst-ridden teenage memories about awkward relationships and peer pressure."

== Track listings ==
U.S. single

1. "My Friends Over You"
2. "It's Been a Summer"

UK Version #1

1. "My Friends Over You"
2. "Sucker" (Live in London)
3. "Hit or Miss" (Live in London)
4. "My Friends Over You" music video

UK Version #2

1. "My Friends Over You"
2. "Eyesore" (Live in London)
3. "Dressed to Kill" (Live in London)

== Music video ==
The music video for the single was directed by the Malloys and features the band playing on a stage in front of a live audience. It features many jokes, ranging from "Typical Video Girls" to the band playing the song with animated oversized heads. The video also features a cameo by the three members of the Transplants (Travis Barker, Tim Armstrong and Rob Aston), Toby Morse of H2O and Brody Dalle of the Distillers. The scene after the second chorus where guitarist Chad Gilbert moves very fast while the rest of the band freezes is a parody of System of a Down's "Toxicity" video.

It was the final video played on MuchUSA before the shift to Fuse.

== Charts ==
=== Weekly charts ===
Weekly chart performance for "My Friends Over You"
Chart (2002)	Peak position
Canada (Nielsen SoundScan)	11
Scottish Singles Sales (Official Charts)	30
UK Singles (Official Charts)	30
UK Rock & Metal (Official Charts)	4
US Billboard Hot 100	85
US Alternative Airplay (Billboard)	5

=== Year-end charts ===
Year-end chart performance for "My Friends Over You"
Chart (2002)	Position
Canada (Nielsen SoundScan)	109

== Certifications ==
Region	Certification	Certified units/sales
United Kingdom (BPI)	Silver	200,000^{‡}
United States (RIAA)	Gold	500,000^{‡}
^{‡} Sales+streaming figures based on certification alone.
