= The Real World: New Orleans (2000 season) =

Coordinates: 29°55′53″N 90°05′44″W

- The cast of The Real World: New Orleans
- Starring: Jamie Murray; Matt Smith; Melissa Howard; Kelley Limp; Danny Roberts; David Broom; Julie Stoffer
- No. of episodes: 23

Release
- Original network: MTV; Syndication
- Original release: June 14 – November 8, 2000

Season chronology
- ← Previous; The Real World: Hawaii Next → The Real World: Back to New York

The Real World: New Orleans is the ninth season of MTV's reality television series The Real World, which focuses on a group of diverse strangers living together for several months in a different city each season, as cameras follow their lives and interpersonal relationships. It is the first season of The Real World to be filmed in West South Central States region of the United States, specifically in Louisiana.

The season featured seven people who lived in a remodeled Civil War-era mansion, called The Belfort, in the Garden District, New Orleans and is the first of two seasons to be filmed in New Orleans. Ten years later, the show made a return in the twenty-fourth season.

Filming took place over the course of 124 days between January and late May 2000 in the Belfort Mansion on St. Charles Avenue. The season premiered June 13 of that year and consisted of 23 episodes.

Author Anne Rice had a guest appearance this season.

== The residence ==
The cast lived at the Belfort Mansion, a 7,000-square-foot (650 m^{2}), two-story 19th Century Greek revival mansion at 2618 St. Charles Avenue in the Garden District of New Orleans. The mansion was originally built for Alexander C. Hutchinson, who lived there with his wife until his death in 1902. It was later divided into apartments, but was in the process of being returned to a single-family residence when producers discovered it. New Orleans-based art director Monroe Kelly and architect Lee Ledbetter restored the mansion's original plan, enabling it to serve as the season's production set. For filming, it was filled with $293,442 worth of art. After filming ended, it took nearly four and a half years to complete the process of returning it to a single residence. The property managed to survive Hurricane Katrina in 2005 without any serious damage.

== Assignment ==
Almost every season of The Real World, beginning with its fifth season, has included the assignment of a season-long group job or task to the housemates. The New Orleans cast was assigned to work at a New Orleans Public-access television station, with a different cast member acting as the producer of the segment every week.

== Cast ==
The Real World: New Orleans cast
| Cast member | Age^{1} | Hometown |
|---|---|---|
| Jamie Murray | 22 | Wilmette, Illinois |
Jamie, who is described by MTV as "cocky, confident and astoundingly ambitious", is a Web entrepreneur and Ayn Rand fan who likes spending time with his male friends, but hopes to get married one day. Melissa developed a crush on him, and flirted with him during the series, though he does not return the feelings beyond friendship.
| Matt Smith | 21 | Hiawassee, Georgia |
Matt is a devout Catholic, and an avid fan of hip-hop and culture, who's been putting himself through Georgia Tech by working as a web designer. During the season, Matt occasionally criticizes Julie for her actions, and says he has a male instinct to protect her. She developed feelings for him, but he did not reciprocate, even when she playfully kissed him on the day they moved out of the house. Matt pursued girls in New Orleans, but never began a relationship on the show.
| Melissa Howard | 22 | Tampa, Florida |
Melissa is a half African-American and half Filipino whom MTV describes as a "5-foot-2-inch bundle of manic wit." Her friends compare her to Chris Rock for her sense of humor. She admits she doesn't easily get along with other women, and demands attention from guys. Her mother is a very traditional Filipino, and Melissa is eager to leave Tampa, which she feels is largely populated by closed-minded people. Melissa sometimes channeled her emotions into painting after she befriended Lionel Milton, a popular New Orleans artist. She was part of the cast of Oxygen Network's defunct prank show Girls Behaving Badly. She married on September 29, 2007, and is now named Melissa Beck.
| Danny Roberts | 22 | Rockmart, Georgia |
Danny is a man whom MTV describes as an adorable, spontaneous and playful "modern-day James Dean", with a devilish grin and sly gaze who, having escaped small-town roots, is something of a "lost soul". He is close to his mother, but not as much so with his strict father. Despite being gay, he does not connect with the local gay community back home in Atlanta. During his stay in the house, Danny was in a relationship with Paul Dill, an officer in the military. To protect Paul's identity during his visits, his face was blurred each time he appeared on camera. After his time in the military ended, Paul and Danny appeared together in an MTV special, with Paul's face no longer blurred.
| Kelley Limp | 21 | Fayetteville, Arkansas |
Kelley is a sorority girl who was dating a medical student named Peter, and spent her time with him rather than in the house. MTV describes her as "opinionated, sassy, strong-willed" direct in her honesty, and loyal to her friends.
| Julie Stoffer | 21 | Delafield, Wisconsin |
Julie is a Mormon college student who was attending Brigham Young University, and was worried about repercussions from the school administration, as she was living with men as well as women, in violation of the school's honor code. Her coming to terms with the world outside of her home and upbringing was a recurring theme throughout the season. Julie's strained relationship with her father was also a focal point of the show; they have a heated argument when her parents come to visit and her father dismisses her as "just being emotional".
| David Broom | 22 | Chicago, Illinois |
David is an African-American singer who works out every day, does not drink or smoke, has a 4.0 grade point average, and aspires to be the first black President of the United States, a mindset he achieved after bouncing back from the heartbreak of a breakup with the girl of his dreams. MTV describes him as "a superbly talented musician and a deeply entertaining person" and a "sweet, vulnerable guy trying to run as far away as possible from the Chicago ghetto he grew up in and the legacy of his preacher father's departure from the family". He has several sexual partners during the course of the season. He avoids conflict with his housemates, dismissing them when they attempt to resolve issues with him. During the season, he performs a rendition of "The Star-Spangled Banner" at a sporting event attended by his housemates, which brings Melissa to tears. In 2003, he performed his original song "Come On, Be My Baby Tonight" on the sixth episode of the first season of the Comedy Central sketch comedy TV series Chappelle's Show.

^Note 1: Age at the time of filming.

== Episodes ==
Overview of The Real World: New Orleans episodes
| No. overall | No. in season | Title | Original release date |
|---|---|---|---|
| 166 | 1 | "New Orleans Newbies" | June 14, 2000 |
In the ninth season premiere, the cast settles into its New Orleans digs: a mansion. As they gradually become acquainted with each other, bonds form, secrets are revealed, and potential romantic entanglements swirl to the surface. Also, the cast takes in Bourbon Street.
| 167 | 2 | "To a New Beginning" | June 21, 2000 |
David expresses an interest in Julie, just as she begins to develop a crush on Matt. Also, Danny pines for his boyfriend, who's in the military and can't visit because he could be discharged if his sexual orientation were discovered.
| 168 | 3 | "Bourbon Street Burlesque" | June 28, 2000 |
While partying at a topless club in the French Quarter, Melissa decides to take to the stage, an act that does not sit well with David.
| 169 | 4 | "All Access Action" | July 5, 2000 |
Melissa is unsure whether or not a fraternity boy she dates is right for her. Kelley is beside herself with joy when she and the other housemates learn what their jobs are.
| 170 | 5 | "Hookups and Linkups" | July 12, 2000 |
Jamie is stuck in the middle when Kelley and Melissa both compete for his attention–until Kelley becomes attracted to another man. Meanwhile, Julie invites Matt to a drag show that she's performing in.
| 171 | 6 | "Birthday Boo Hoo" | July 19, 2000 |
When her former boyfriend visits, Melissa worries that he wants to rekindle their relationship. The tension causes her to lose her temper–and take it out on David.
| 172 | 7 | "Cupid Strikes" | July 26, 2000 |
With Valentine's Day approaching, Danny is tempted to stray from his long-distance relationship with Paul. Meanwhile, Kelley's relationship with Peter reaches new heights, and Julie's younger brother Alan visits.
| 173 | 8 | "Two Days and Too Little Help" | August 5, 2000 |
Kelley takes the lead in producing the first episode of "The Real 7," the cast's cable-access TV show. But tensions mount when David insists on singing a song during the show's introductory segment. Matt builds the show's set.
| 174 | 9 | "Race Matters" | August 9, 2000 |
After the guide on an airboat ride makes a racist comment, Melissa becomes upset by Jamie's inability to understand her hurt. She, David and Julie discuss racism, language and the ability of words to scar.
| 175 | 10 | "David's Power Struggles" | August 16, 2000 |
David produces an episode of "The Real 7," and alienates some of his roommates by his aloof approach. David invites his mother to visit when he gets the opportunity to sing the national anthem before a minor-league hockey game.
| 176 | 11 | "Matt Explores His Options" | August 23, 2000 |
Melissa comes to realize the part her childhood played in contributing to her unhappy present---and makes a brave decision. Matt discusses what he's looking for in a girlfriend, and invites several girls over to the house.
| 177 | 12 | "Mardi Gras Mayhem" | August 30, 2000 |
For Mardi Gras, horror scribe Anne Rice invites the roommates to ride on a float in a festival parade. David opts to host a party at home instead, but the other six enjoy themselves---Danny, perhaps, too much.
| 178 | 13 | "South African Sojourn" | September 6, 2000 |
The cast heads to South Africa, where they tour the townships and District Six, a section of Cape Town that was demolished under the country's apartheid system, forcing 60,000 people of color to move. They also experience abseiling and enjoy a safari.
| 179 | 14 | "David Takes the Plunge" | September 13, 2000 |
As the South Africa trip comes to a close, Matt attempts to draw David out of his shell. The roommates also try bungee jumping at Victoria Falls, an experience that proves memorable for Matt, David and Julie.
| 180 | 15 | "Meet the Parents" | September 20, 2000 |
Danny's family visits and meets Paul for the first time. Danny and Matt, who believes homosexuality is sinful, bridge their differences; and Jamie produces an episode of the "Real 7" that explores the influence of African tribal music.
| 181 | 16 | "Julie's Heart Trouble" | October 4, 2000 |
Julie attempts to emerge from her sheltered past by undertaking new experiences, including singing at a coffee shop's open-mike night and trying her hand at boxing at a party. Also, Jamie confronts Kelley about her attitude toward him.
| 182 | 17 | "Stormin' Mormons" | October 11, 2000 |
Julie's family visits, leading to an uncomfortable reunion with her father. She also produces an episode of "The Real 7" and books her brother Alan's band to appear on the show. Danny, who's aware that Alan and his pals have not been exposed to many gay people, tries to change their views.
| 183 | 18 | "For Peter's Sake" | October 18, 2000 |
Julie's use of profanity leads to a major blowup between her and her father. In other events, Kelley is indecisive about leaving New Orleans---and Peter---once taping ends. Also, she makes a curt comment that leads to a spat with Peter.
| 184 | 19 | "Mud-Wrestling and Tongue Tussling" | October 25, 2000 |
Melissa finds inner peace after she takes up painting with a local instructor. Also, Jamie decides to enlist Julie as his spiritual guide when he tires of the party-animal lifestyle he's been living.
| 185 | 20 | "David Strips Down" | October 25, 2000 |
David produces an episode of The Real 7 focused on swimsuits, and again alienates the others with his independent behavior. Also, Matt meets a girl who intrigues him, leading Julie to pull a prank that further distances her from Matt.
| 186 | 21 | "David's D-Day" | November 1, 2000 |
Julie writes a letter to a surprised Matt about their strained relationship. Also, David throws a party for his friends, including several strippers, angering his roommates. In addition, he skips cleaning the house in favor of rehearsing for a recording session, a decision that leads Jamie to call a house meeting to confront him about his behavior.
| 187 | 22 | "The Never Ending Story" | November 8, 2000 |
Following a heated discussion with his roommates, David tries to mend his ways. In other events, Julie and Matt discuss her letter to him, and Kelley–who has kept her distance–reintegrates herself into the house.
| 188 | 23 | "Leavin' Louisiana" | November 8, 2000 |
Each cast member reflects on what they have learned over the past 5 months and who they are going to miss. One by one, they each say goodbye and leave New Orleans and the Belfort mansion behind forever.

== Season highlights ==
- The New Orleans cast was the first (and, to date, the only) cast to be featured on the cover of TV Guide, appearing on the June 24, 2000, edition.
- Discussions on race are a staple on The Real World. On a boat trip in Louisiana, the boat guide referred to a type of stork the group spotted as a "nigger stork". Melissa took offense to the comment, and to the fact that Jamie was not as offended. After the show, it was revealed that the tour guide apologized to Melissa. In another discussion on race, Julie expressed that she was raised to cross the street if she saw a black person. After this, Melissa stated she was tired of talking about racism.
- During the cast's group trip to South Africa, Melissa and Julie talked about racial issues, and were upset that David again sequestered himself from the group, preferring to spend time with their African tour guides.
- In a crossover event with that season's Road Rules (the sister series to The Real World), the Road Rules cast's mission was to steal the mansion's toy robot dog. The housemates, recalling that the Road Rules team from years back had stolen the eight ball from the Miami cast's pool table, hid their eight ball, not realizing that it was not the target.

== After filming ==
After the cast left the Real World mansion, all seven of them appeared to discuss their experiences both during and since their time on the show, The Real World New Orleans Unmasked, which premiered on November 16, 2000, and was hosted by Nathan Blackburn from The Real World: Seattle and Rachel Campos from The Real World: San Francisco.

Though Stoffer and castmate Melissa Howard left the house as friends, their friendship later dissolved after disagreements regarding speaking engagements and monetary disputes, with Howard indicating during their time on the 2003 Real World/Road Rules Challenge: Battle of the Sexes that they were no longer friends.

At the 2008 The Real World Awards Bash, David was nominated in the "Biggest Playa" category, while Melissa was in the running for "Best Dance-Off".

After filming, Julie Stoffer was suspended from Brigham Young University for violating the school's honor code, which prohibits unmarried students from living in the same house with unrelated people of the opposite sex, including when school is not in session. Both Stoffer and her parents, themselves BYU alumni, criticized the manner in which the school suspended Stoffer, on the grounds that the letter with which BYU notified Stoffer of their decision, according to the Stoffers, implied that Stoffer had sexual relations with her male housemates, which Stoffer characterized as "totally false and slanderous." The school gave Stoffer six days to appeal their ruling, and included an outline of actions that Stoffer could take to regain admittance to the school, but as Stoffer was traveling while filming the MTV spinoff series, Real World/Road Rules Challenge, she did not file an appeal, and later stated that felt no respect for the school or its Honor Code, accusing the institution of assuming, on the basis of a "technical[ity]", that she was guilty of immoral conduct, when the footage shot during her time in the Real World mansion established otherwise. Stoffer was later a correspondent and host for the TV show The Electric Playground on the video game-themed cable TV network G4. She also spoke on behalf of Path-U-Find Media, promoting her moral values and working in abstinence and anti-tobacco campaigns. In 2004, Stoffer married ophthalmologist Spencer Rogers. Together they have three children.

Melissa Howard created a blog during her time on the show called Princess Melissa, and as of 2008, continues to maintain it. She went on to become an actress and comedian who has worked on The Jamie Foxx Show, and starred in the Oxygen sketch comedy series Girls Behaving Badly. She also appeared in the 2005 Bravo show Battle of the Network Reality Stars. In 2007 she married Justin Beck, a guitarist for the group Glassjaw, with whom she bore two daughter, Shalom Mazie and Maja. As of April 2022, she is a stay-at-home mother living in New York.

David Broom continued his musical work. Among his appearances was a 2003 performance on Chappelle's Show, appearing in the sixth episode of that's show's first season. Eventually he would go on to create a YouTube cooking series under the moniker Tokyo Niyeli. As of April 2022, he also writes manga.

Kelley Limp moved to Los Angeles, where she works in marketing for the television industry. In 2002, she began dating actor Scott Wolf, after meeting through a mutual friend in New York City. They married in May 2004, and live in Santa Monica, California. Their son, Jackson Kayse, was born on March 22, 2009. He was followed by Miller (born in 2012), and Lucy (born in 2014). On June 10, 2025, the couple announced their separation after 21 years of marriage, with Wolf subsequently filing for divorce. On June 24, Wolf filed for a restraining order against Kelley.

Danny Roberts and former partner Wes Pereria have adopted a daughter, Naiya Sage. In 2018, he revealed that he had been disagnosed as HIV positive in 2011. He also revealed that his close friendship with former roommate Kelley Limp helped him through it. In 2018, Roberts revealed in an interview with Entertainment Weekly that he was HIV positive since 2011.

Matt Smith became a sports writer for the NBA's Phoenix Suns and webmaster of lifeteen.com. He has stated that he remained a virgin until he married his wife, Candyce on April 13, 2007. They live in Phoenix, Arizona, and had their first child, Norah, in September 2008. Their second child, Stella St. Clare, was born in October 2010. As of April 2022, they have six children.

In 2022, the cast reunited for The Real World Homecoming: New Orleans.

=== The Challenge ===
This is the second season of The Real World whose entire cast has at one time or another competed in MTV's spin-off reality series The Real World/Road Rules Challenge. The first is The Real World: Boston.

| Cast member | Seasons of The Challenge |
|---|---|
| Jamie Murray | Extreme Challenge, Battle of the Sexes, The Gauntlet 2 |
| Matt Smith | The Gauntlet |
| Melissa Howard | Battle of the Sexes |
| Danny Roberts | Battle of the Seasons (2002) |
| Kelley Limp | Battle of the Seasons (2002) |
| Julie Stoffer | Extreme Challenge, Battle of the Sexes, The Inferno, The Inferno II, The Gauntlet 2 |
| David Broom | Battle of the Sexes, The Gauntlet |
