= Catalyst (New Found Glory album) =

Studio album by New Found Glory
- Released: May 18, 2004
- Recorded: September 2003 – January 2004
- Studios: Royaltone, Sunset Sound, Los Angeles, California
- Genre: Pop-punk
- Length: 43:47
- Labels: Geffen, Drive-Thru
- Producer: Neal Avron

New Found Glory chronology
Sticks and Stones (2002)	Catalyst (2004)	Coming Home (2006)

Singles from Catalyst
- 1. "All Downhill from Here" Released: March 22, 2004; 2. "Truth of My Youth" Released: August 17, 2004; 3. "Failure's Not Flattering" Released: October 26, 2004; 4. "I Don't Wanna Know" Released: February 14, 2005

Catalyst is the fourth studio album by American rock band New Found Glory (NFG), released on May 18, 2004 through Drive-Thru and Geffen Records. It was the band's last album to be produced by Neal Avron until 2011's Radiosurgery.

== Background ==
New Found Glory released their third album Sticks and Stones in June 2002 as a joint release between MCA and Drive-Thru Records. By December, the group were working on new songs, which vocalist Jordan Pundik said were "getting a lot heavier and even more aggressive". Between April and June 2003, they co-headlined the Honda Civic Tour with Good Charlotte. They had a practice room backstage that allowed them to work on new material. Around this time, MCA Records was absorbed by Universal Music Group subsidiary Geffen Records, which resulted in its staff and roster being moved to Geffen. Bassist Ian Grushka thought that the merger was a positive experience, as he said MCA was "kinda falling apart. Many people that worked for MCA were taking their job for granted and they were too comfortable ... slacking off and not doing their job". In August, the group toured Australia and Japan, before taking a week's break. After this, they started pre-production for their next album at the Hurley factory in Costa Mesa, California and the Swing House. Pre-production this time lasted longer than for previous material, as the band worked on 30 tracks. The group moved into a house together in Malibu, California, and worked on material whenever they wanted to. It gave them more free time, compared to their past records, to develop their song ideas.

== Production ==
After playing two shows, the band began recording their next album in September 2003. The sessions were helmed by producer Neal Avron, and took place at Royaltone and Sunset Sound Studios. Avron was assisted by engineers Chris Wonzer, Ryan Castle and Femio Hernández. Castle and Travis Huff served as Pro Tools engineers. Recording finished in January 2004, after the band tracked 18 songs in total. A variety of session musicians appear on the recordings: David Campbell (string arrangements and viola on "I Don't Wanna Know"), Joel Derouin (violin on "I Don't Wanna Know"), Charlie Bisharat (violin on "I Don't Wanna Know"), Larry Corbett (cello on "I Don't Wanna Know"), Riley Avron (backing vocals on "Your Biggest Mistake"), Debra Byrd (backing vocals on "Doubt Full"), Angela Fisher (backing vocals on "Doubt Full") and Tony Wilkins (backing vocals on "Doubt Full").

In addition, members of the group's contemporaries also appear: Freddy Cricien of Madball (backing vocals on "Your Biggest Mistake" and "At Least I'm Known for Something"), James Dewees of Reggie and the Full Effect (keyboards on "Failure's Not Flattering"), Andy Jackson of Hot Rod Circuit (backing vocals on "Over the Head, Below the Knees"), Toby Morse of H_{2}O (backing vocals on "Over the Head, Below the Knees") and Hazen Street (backing vocals on "Over the Head, Below the Knees"). Tom Lord-Alge mixed the tracks at South Beach Studios, before they were mastered by Ted Jensen.

== Composition and lyrics ==
When New Found Glory started out, they would write material they enjoyed and not overthink it. For their self-titled and Sticks and Stones albums, they focused more on what their fans would like. With Catalyst, they returned to the earlier method of writing whatever they enjoyed. Pundik said the band wanted to reinvent themselves musically with Catalyst. Grushka said Gilbert wrote 95% of the music on the album, while he contributed a bridge and a few lyrics and Klein wrote the majority of the lyrics. Musically, the sound of Catalyst has been described as pop punk, showcasing influence from hardcore punk. In addition, it introduces a mini choir ("Doubt Full"), metal ("At Least I'm Known for Something") and hardcore punk-esque ("Intro") riffs, and string ("I Don't Wanna Know") and keyboard ("Failure's Not Flattering") instruments to the group's sound. Pundik said the guitars were "a lot bigger sounding", compared to those heard on Sticks and Stones. He added that the songs were predominantly riff-based. His vocals were compared to American Hi-Fi frontman Stacy Jones. Discussing the album's title, Bolooki explained: "A catalyst is something that can spark change or help bring about change without actually being changed by the reaction itself."

"Intro" is a short 37-second long song, which talks about people who treat punk rock as a fashion style. Gilbert came up with the riff to "All Downhill from Here" while driving. He was on his way to practice as he randomly started singing the riff in his head. He subsequently wrote the rest of the song on the day. He said it was about "any kind of relationship with someone goes sour and things go south from there." It drew comparison to Alkaline Trio. "This Disaster" sees Pundik singing in a higher vocal register, earning a comparison to Davey Havok of AFI. "Truth of My Youth" is an up-tempo track that was reminiscent of the group's older material, and is followed by the ballad "I Don't Wanna Know". It talks about a couple's love maturing, and features violins in the vein of Yellowcard. "Your Biggest Mistake" showed the band's strength in writing pop punk material.

Gilbert wrote a lead part over the chorus in "Failure's Not Flattering", which Pundik jokingly said sounded like it was from Beverly Hills, 90210. Gilbert brought Dewees in to add a keyboard in the intro and chorus, earning it a comparison to the Get Up Kids. Bolooki said the drums were recorded in an isolation booth to give it an "extremely tight [1980s] drum sound". The song went under the working title "Belinda Carlisle" due to its 1980s sound. According to Gilbert, the track is about making mistakes, and also serves as a wake-up call for "a person to change. And if they don't, it's all gonna be messed up." "Ending in Tragedy" is a ballad about a guy trying to save a relationship, and is followed by hardcore punk track "At Least I'm Known for Something". "No News Is Good News" is influenced by new wave and discusses how the media can be obsessed on negative situations. The closing track "Who Am I" is followed on the CD by two hidden joke tracks.

== Release ==
In January 2004, Gilbert played a handful of shows with his former band Shai Hulud. On February 18, 2004, Catalyst was announced for release in May. A music video was filmed for "All Downhill from Here" on March 15 in Los Angeles, California with director Meiert Avis. The track was released as a single on March 22, before being released to modern rock radio on April 6. On April 22, the "All Downhill from Here" music video was posted on Launch.com, and premiered on Total Request Live the following day. It features the band performing combined with clay models and computer graphics created by French animation company No Brains. The group went with Avis' treatment as they were tired of previous proposals that attempted to convey heartbreak, and instead went with one that had no relation to the lyrics. Catalyst was made available for streaming on May 13, before being released on May 18 through Geffen and Drive-Thru Records. Grushka said Drive-Thru had no involvement in album, but they kept the label's "logo on our CDs because we feel they had a big part in helping us to get to this level". Some CD copies had an enhanced portion that featured a making of the music video for "All Downhill from Here". Copies purchased from Best Buy included a code to download the bonus track "Whiskey Rose". To promote its release, the group did a series of club shows, festival appearances, in-store performances, MTV interviews, and an appearance on Jimmy Kimmel Live!.

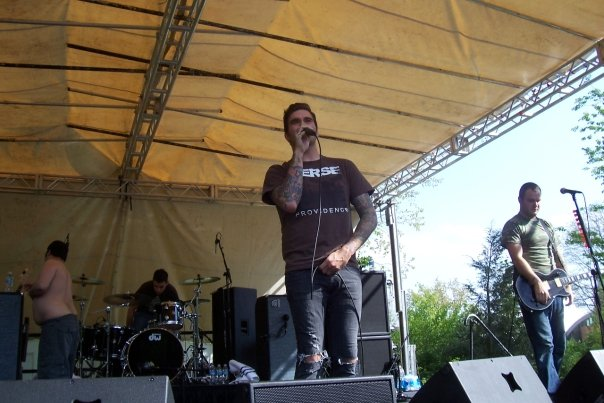
New Found Glory performing onstage, May 4, 2004

A music video was filmed for "Failure's Not Flattering" in late June with Avis directing again. Between late June and mid-August, the group performed on the Warped Tour. For the outing, Dewees joined the group as a touring keyboardist. "Failure's Not Flattering" was released to radio on July 26. The music video for it premiered two days later on Total Request Live. The clip shows the band shrunken down and held captive by two regular-sized individuals. They eventually escape and stumble into a party. However, due to their size, they are ignored. The group start performing; the music they make starts to animate characters such as a vampire from a TV and aliens from a video game. Later on, the band is shown asleep, before being sucked up by a vacuum cleaner. "Truth of My Youth" was released as a single on August 17. At the end of the month and the start of September, the group went on a brief European tour, which included performances at the Reading and Leeds Festivals.

On September 20, a music video was filmed for "I Don't Wanna Know" in Los Angeles with director Liz Friedlander. Following the filming, the group played a few shows in Japan with Yellowcard and Hazen Street. In October and November, the group supported Green Day on their headlining US tour. On October 25, a music video for "I Don't Wanna Know" premiered on Total Request Live. The following day, "I Don't Wanna Know" was released to modern rock radio, and "Failure's Not Flattering" was released as a single. In December, the group went on an Australia tour with support from Reggie and the Full Effect, Righteous Jams, the Explosion and Hot Water Music. In January 2005, the band supported Green Day on a tour of Europe. Following this, the band went on a headlining UK tour, which lasted until mid-February, with Hot Water Music and the Explosion. "I Don't Wanna Know" was released as a single on February 14. Between early March and late May, the band went on a headlining club tour, dubbed the Back to Basics Tour. They were supported by Reggie and the Full Effect and Eisley.

== Reception ==
Professional ratings
Review scores
Source	Rating
411Mania	7/10
AllMusic	3/5 stars
Chicago Tribune	Unfavorable
Entertainment Weekly	B+
Kerrang!	4/5 stars
Melodic	3.5/5 stars
Plugged In	Mixed
Robert Christgau	(dud)
Rolling Stone	3/5 stars
Sputnikmusic	1/5

=== Critical response ===
Entertainment Weekly writer Sean Richardson praised the band for adding tracks that range from "string-laden balladry ('I Don't Wanna Know') to surging hardcore ('At Least I'm Known for Something')" alongside their pop punk repertoire, concluding that "they may have eyes for the Top 40, but these skater boys still know how to rock." Johnny Loftus from AllMusic said, "Catalyst doesn't quite graduate New Found Glory from the punk-pop rungs. From its main aesthetic thrust to the pristine mixing and production, this is a slick and durable Drive-Thru missive, micro-tweaked for maximum Warped Tour ROI. Still, the guys in NFG have been at this a while, so a little exploration is not only understandable, it's expected. To that end, Catalyst's East Coast hardcore kickoff is welcome." Rolling Stone writer Kirk Miller gave note of the '80s thrash metal aesthetics that tracks like "This Disaster" and "At Least I Am Known for Something" utilize, as well as other various subgenres ("hardcore punk, synth-rock and emo-tinged ballads") throughout the track listing, concluding that "the band's extra effort shows, giving its pop glory some newfound energy."

Robert Christgau graded the album as a "dud", indicating "a bad record whose details rarely merit further thought." Writing for the Chicago Tribune, Blair R. Fischer criticized Pundik's vocal performance for getting "more irritating with every song."

=== Commercial performance and legacy ===
The album debuted at a career-high number three on the Billboard 200 chart, after selling 146,000 copies in its first week. It was later certified gold by the Recording Industry Association of America (RIAA) in August 2004. By June 2005, the album had sold over 600,000 copies. The "All Downhill from Here" music video was nominated for Best Breakthrough Video at the 2004 MTV Video Music Awards.

Philip Obenschain of Alternative Press said the album was a "nostalgic snapshot of a mid-career transition", which not only displayed what the group were capable of when under pressure, but also that "pop-punk could reach a broader radio and MTV audience without compromising its credibility". In 2016, Gilbert ranked Catalyst as his second-to-least favorite New Found Glory album. Looking back, he said it "doesn't really make any sense ... Catalyst is all over the place [musically]." The group performed the album in its entirety on a tour in 2017 to celebrate the 20th anniversary since they formed.

== Track listing ==
All songs written by New Found Glory.

No.	Title	Length
1.	"Intro"	0:37
2.	"All Downhill from Here"	3:12
3.	"This Disaster"	3:08
4.	"Truth of My Youth"	3:04
5.	"I Don't Wanna Know"	3:30
6.	"Your Biggest Mistake"	2:47
7.	"Doubt Full"	3:36
8.	"Failure's Not Flattering"	3:51
9.	"Over the Head, Below the Knees"	3:40
10.	"Ending in Tragedy"	3:31
11.	"At Least I'm Known for Something"	3:32
12.	"I'd Kill to Fall Asleep"	3:11
13.	"No News Is Good News"	3:00
14.	"Who Am I"	3:18
Total length:		43:47

UK bonus tracks
No.	Title	Length
14.	"Radio Adelaide"	2:43
15.	"Constant Static"	3:18
16.	"Who Am I"	3:19

Japanese bonus tracks
No.	Title	Length
14.	"Radio Adelaide"	2:43
15.	"Constant Static"	3:18
16.	"Whiskey Rose"	3:50
17.	"Who Am I"	3:19

== Personnel ==
Personnel per booklet.

New Found Glory

- Jordan Pundik – lead vocals
- Chad Gilbert – lead guitar
- Steve Klein – rhythm guitar
- Ian Grushka – bass guitar
- Cyrus Bolooki – drums

Additional musicians

- Kendall Payne – backing vocals (track 5)
- David Campbell – string arrangements, viola (track 5)
- Joel Derouin – violin (track 5)
- Charlie Bisharat – violin (track 5)
- Larry Corbett – cello (track 5)
- Freddy Cricien – backing vocals (tracks 6 and 11)
- Riley Avron – backing vocals (track 6)
- Debra Byrd – backing vocals (track 7)
- Angela Fisher – backing vocals (track 7)
- Tony Wilkins – backing vocals (track 7)
- James Dewees – keyboards (track 8)
- Andy Jackson – backing vocals (track 9)
- Toby Morse – backing vocals (track 9)
- Hazen Street – backing vocals (track 9)
- Neal Avron – keyboards

Production

- Neal Avron – producer, recording
- Tom Lord-Alge – mixing
- Ted Jensen – mastering
- Chris Wonzer – assistant engineer
- Ryan Castle – assistant engineer, Pro Tools engineer
- Femio Hernández – assistant engineer
- Travis Huff – Pro Tools engineer
- Gunnar Gaylord – artwork, illustration
- New Found Glory – artwork, art direction
- JP Robinson – art direction
- James Minchin III – photography

== Charts ==
=== Weekly charts ===
Weekly chart performance for Catalyst
Chart (2004)	Peak position
Australian Albums (ARIA)	32
Canadian Albums (Nielsen SoundScan)	16
French Albums (SNEP)	154
Japanese Albums (Oricon)	17
Scottish Albums (Official Charts)	22
UK Albums (Official Charts)	27
UK Rock & Metal Albums (Official Charts)	2
US Billboard 200	3

=== Year-end charts ===
Year-end chart performance for Catalyst
Chart (2004)	Position
US Billboard 200	140

== Certifications ==
Certifications for Catalyst
Region	Certification	Certified units/sales
United States (RIAA)	Gold	500,000^{^}
^{^} Shipments figures based on certification alone.
