= Melissa Beck =

American actress (born 1977)

- Born: Melissa Howard; February 12, 1977 (age 49)
- Occupation: Actress
- Spouse: Justin Beck
- Children: 3

Melissa Beck (née Howard; born February 12, 1977) is an American actress, reality show personality and comedian known for her time as a cast member on the 2000 reality television series The Real World: New Orleans and the 2002–2005 prank show Girls Behaving Badly.

== Early life ==
Melissa Howard was born February 12, 1977, in Okinawa, Japan to a Filipino mother and African-American father. She, her older sister Marlene and their younger brother, Michael, grew up in Valrico, Florida. She attended Brandon Senior High School and the University of South Florida, from which she graduated with a degree in journalism and mass communications.

== Career ==
In 2000, Howard was one of seven people selected from a pool of 35,221 applicants to be cast on The Real World: New Orleans, the ninth season of the long-running MTV reality television series. MTV producer and casting director, Andrew Hoegl explains that she was selected on the basis of her audition tape, which he calls "hysterical", and credits the season's humor to Howard, who referred to herself in her audition tape as a "half-black, half-Filipino Chris Rock". Filming took place over the course of 124 days between January and late May 2000. Her 2000 MTV biography describes her as possessing a "manic wit".

After filming ended, Howard moved to Los Angeles to pursue a career in standup comedy, as well as to engage in acrylic painting, an interest she developed while in New Orleans. She stayed in Los Angeles for approximately five or six years. She later started a blog called Princess Melissa in order to host a web store to sell her artwork, and to express herself in writing, telling HuffPost in a 2002 interview, "I've always felt more comfortable in my written presentation than in my face." She later moved her online presence to Tumblr and then to Patreon.

Howard was ranked #92 on Maxim magazine's "Hot 100 Women of 2004" feature.

She was a member of the all-female cast of the Oxygen network's hidden camera/practical joke reality television series Girls Behaving Badly, which aired from 2002 – 2005. In 2005 appeared on Bravo's Battle of the Network Reality Stars.

On May 22, 2020, she launched a podcast with co-host Amanda Strong, Imperfect Strangers. In April 2022, The Real World Homecoming: New Orleans premiered on Paramount+, reuniting Beck with all six of her former roommates from The Real World: New Orleans.

== Personal life ==
After the run of Girls Behaving Badly, Howard moved to New York to work part-time in a non-entertainment industry-related job, and to live with her boyfriend, J.

On September 29, 2007, Howard married Glassjaw guitarist Justin Beck at their home on Long Island. She subsequently took his surname and became Melissa Beck. On March 20, 2009, Beck gave birth to their first daughter, Shalom Mazie Beck. On August 22, 2012, Beck announced on her Tumblr that she and her husband were expecting another daughter. Maja Ilani was born on January 1, 2013. As of 2022, they have three children.

In October 2012, a tree fell on Beck's house during Hurricane Sandy, destroying it and burying her older daughter in debris. Justin pulled the child out from the rubble, finding that she was apparently unharmed. They took the baby to the hospital, which discharged her three hours later, having confirmed that she suffered no injuries.

== Filmography ==
=== As herself ===
- The Real World Homecoming: New Orleans (2022)
- Battle of the Network Reality Stars (2005)
- Reality TV Secrets Revealed 2 (2004)
- The Real World Hook-Ups (2003)
- True Hollywood Story – Episode: The Real World (2003)
- The New Tom Green Show – Episode: August 1, 2003 (2003)
- Reality TV Secrets: How to Get on the Show! (2003)
- Real World/Road Rules Challenge: Battle of the Sexes (2003)
- Girls Behaving Badly (2002–2003)
- The Real World Movie: The Lost Season (2002)
- Real World/Road Rules Challenge: Extreme Challenge – Episode: #1.4 (2001)
- The X Show – Episode: August 21, 2000 (2000)
- The Real World: Tenth Anniversary Special (2000)
- The Real World: New Orleans (2000)

=== Actor ===
- The Jamie Foxx Show – Episode: If the Shoe Fits (2000) Reporter
