= Steve Klein (musician) =

American musician (born 1979)

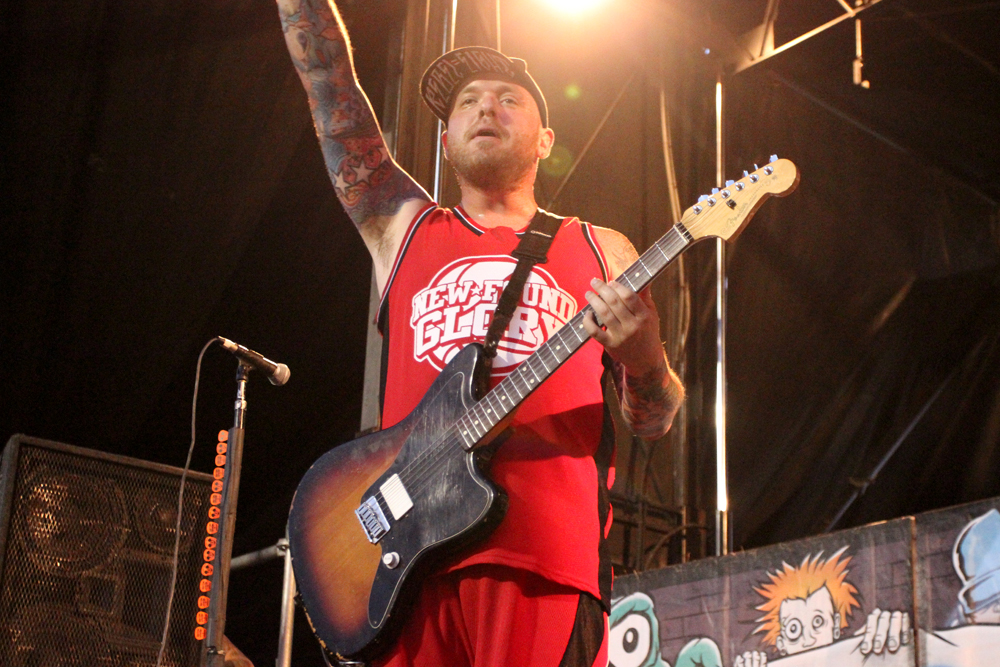
- Klein in 2012

Background information
- Born: Stephen Lee Klein; September 30, 1979 (age 47)
- Origin: Coral Springs, Florida, U.S.
- Genres: Rock; pop punk; melodic hardcore; hardcore punk
- Occupations: Musician; songwriter; guitarist; record producer
- Instruments: Guitar; vocals
- Years active: 1997–2014; 2016–present

Stephen Lee "Steve" Klein (born September 30, 1979) is an American musician and record producer. He is most famous for being the co-founder of Florida rock group New Found Glory, for whom he was the primary lyricist and rhythm guitarist.

== Career and arrest ==
Having formed New Found Glory with frontman Jordan Pundik in 1997, Klein performed on seven of the band's eleven studio albums. Klein also contributed guitar to the band's now defunct alter-ego side project, The International Superheroes of Hardcore, where he was known under the pseudonym of "Mr. Mosh". Klein made his production debut in 2011, on Man Overboard's self titled second album.

The band announced in December 2013 that Klein was no longer in the band, due to "personal differences."

On March 12, 2014, idobi Radio reported that on the same day New Found Glory removed Klein from the band, Klein was arrested on multiple felony charges, including lewd acts with a minor, and possession of child pornography. On February 9, 2021, Klein pleaded no contest to a charge of felony indecent exposure and on March 2, Klein was sentenced to a two-year formal probation and was required to register as a sex offender for 10 years. After a year of probation, the charge was then downgraded to a misdemeanor.

== Discography ==
=== with New Found Glory ===
- 1997: It's All About The Girls (EP)
- 1998: Waiting (EP)
- 1999: Nothing Gold Can Stay
- 2000: From the Screen to Your Stereo (EP)
- 2000: New Found Glory
- 2002: Sticks and Stones
- 2004: Catalyst
- 2006: Coming Home
- 2007: From the Screen to Your Stereo Part II
- 2008: Hits
- 2008: Tip of the Iceberg (EP)
- 2009: Not Without a Fight
- 2011: Radiosurgery

=== with International Superheroes of Hardcore ===
- 2008: Takin' It Ova!
- 2008: HPxHC (EP)

=== as Producer ===
- 2011: Man Overboard (Man Overboard album)
- 2013: What You Don't See
- 2013: Heart Attack (Man Overboard album)
- 2013: The Finer Things (album)

== Record labels ==
with New Found Glory

- Fiddler Records (1997)
- Eulogy Records (1999)
- Drive-Thru Records/Geffen Records (2000–2007)
- Bridge 9 Records (2008–2013)
- Epitaph Records (2009–2013)
