= Richard Reines =

American recording industry executive

Richard Reines is an American recording industry executive who is co-owner of Drive-Thru Records with his sister, Stefanie Reines. Since its establishment in 1996, Drive-Thru Records has achieved notable success with bands including New Found Glory, Fenix*TX, Midtown, Finch, The Starting Line, Something Corporate, The Early November, Dashboard Confessional, Senses Fail and Hellogoodbye.

Reines graduated New York University Film School and has directed music videos by The Bloodhound Gang, Size 14 (namely the song Claire Danes Poster), Jimmy Eat World, Goldfinger, New Found Glory, Sloan, Rotator Cuff, Something Corporate, The Starting Line, Finch, and many others. He also directed a commercial for Dr. Pepper/Rolling Stone. Reines hasn't directed in many years, instead concentrating on the label and band management.

In 2010, he joined the 9th annual Independent Music Awards judging panel to assist independent musicians' careers.

He is now focusing on band management and artist development at War Road Management, currently representing Nothing But Thieves, the Wrecks, Airways, Roads Below, the Million, and ufo ufo with his sister Stefanie.

== Personal life ==
Originally from Fort Lee, New Jersey, Reines splits his time between a home in Matawan, New Jersey and one in California.
