= Head on Collision =

Single by New Found Glory

from the album Sticks and Stones
- Released: October 15, 2002
- Recorded: 2002
- Genre: Pop punk
- Length: 3:42
- Label: Drive-Thru, MCA
- Songwriter(s): New Found Glory
- Producer(s): Neal Avron

New Found Glory singles chronology
"My Friends Over You" (2002)	"Head on Collision" (2002)	"All Downhill from Here" (2004)

"Head on Collision" is the second single from New Found Glory's third studio album, Sticks and Stones (2002). The single peaked at number 28 on the Billboard Modern Rock Tracks chart.

== Track list ==
All songs written by New Found Glory.

1. "Head on Collision"
2. "Head on Collision" (Radio Session)
3. "Something I Call Personality" (Radio Session)

== Use in popular media ==
- Pop punk band All Time Low derived their name from lyrics in "Head on Collision".

== Charts ==
Chart performance for "Head on Collision"
Chart (2002–2003)	Peak position
Australia (ARIA)	83
Canada (Nielsen SoundScan)	24
Scotland (OCC)	66
UK Singles (OCC)	64
UK Rock & Metal (OCC)	6
US Alternative Airplay (Billboard)	28
