= Tim Calpin =

American screenwriter

Timothy Calpin
- Born: 1979 (age 46–47); Scranton, Pennsylvania
- Education: Syracuse University
- Occupations: Screenwriter, production assistant
- Writing career
- Notable work: Assassination of a High School President

Timothy Calpin, Jr. (born 1979) is an American screenwriter best known for writing the 2009 film Assassination of a High School President.

== Biography ==
Calpin was born in Scranton, Pennsylvania, and first became interested in writing while attending Scranton Preparatory School, from which he graduated in 1997. He went on to earn a bachelor's degree in film at Syracuse University. Calpin wrote his first script while at Syracuse. After leaving college, he relocated to New York City where he worked mainly as a production assistant on commercials and short films, he moved to Los Angeles, California in November 2003 after getting an agent.

In Los Angeles, he met Kevin Jakubowski, who helped him get a job on the television comedy series South Park for two seasons, first as a production assistant and later as a personal assistant to executive producer Anne Garefino. Working on South Park, Calpin says he and Jakubowski "picked up plenty" from watching Trey Parker and Matt Stone and the other staff writers at work, and the pair realized that they shared similar writing styles and "comedic sensibilities". The pair first wrote and collaborated on Your Ex-Girlfriend's Cat, which was optioned by Rogue Pictures but has still not been greenlighted. In December 2005, while South Park was on hiatus, Calpin and Jakubowski began writing Assassination of a High School President, a screenplay which evolved from high school-related stories they had been working on separately. When the completed script was given to film studios in April 2006, despite receiving a generally positive response, companies were reluctant to produce the film as it was not conventionally mainstream, until film producer Roy Lee brought the script to Yari Film Group, who signed on to produce, and Brett Simon soon after signed on to direct.

In September 2007 Calpin wrote and directed the short film Gentleman Jack, about two men trying to pick up the same girl in a bar, which was Agapic Films' first feature.

Calpin is currently working with Jakubowski on a film for Lions Gate Entertainment about two professional pool players, and a script for MTV Films, possibly about the local music scene in a small town.
