= Yari Film Group =

Independent film company

Yari Film Group, LLC
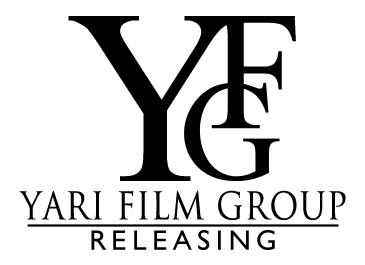
- Type: Private
- Industry: Motion picture
- Founded: 2005; 21 years ago
- Founder: Bob Yari
- Headquarters: Los Angeles, California, United States
- Key people: Bob Yari (CEO)
- Services: Film production; Film distribution; OTT; Foreign sales; Home video
- Owner: Yari Family Company
- Parent: Yari Family Company

The Yari Film Group (YFG) is an independent film company headed by producer Bob Yari. The company deals in financing, production, acquisition, sales and distribution of theatrical feature films.

The Yari Film Group was formed in 2005 through the merger of Stratus Film Company, Bull’s Eye Entertainment, El Camino Pictures, Bob Yari Productions, and Syndicate Films International. YFG is led by Bob Yari, who intended to create a film consortium that would minimize investment risk and maximize creative freedom for filmmakers by financing a large slate of diverse films. Within the first two years, the group had produced 16 films. The company's early production credits included Academy Award Winner Crash, led by Matt Dillon and Sandra Bullock; The Hoax, with Richard Gere; The Matador with Pierce Brosnan; The Painted Veil starring Edward Norton; A Love Song for Bobby Long with John Travolta; Dave Chappelle's Block Party; Prime with Meryl Streep; Thumbsucker with Keanu Reeves and Vince Vaughn and Nothing but the Truth starring Kate Beckinsale.

== History ==
Yari Film Group Releasing (YFGR), the distribution arm of YFG, was created in 2006. YFGR's first releases were Winter Passing, starring Will Ferrell and Ed Harris, and Find Me Guilty, starring Vin Diesel. That same year, YFGR distributed The Illusionist, starring Edward Norton, Paul Giamatti and Jessica Biel, which pulled in roughly $40 million at the U.S. box office, and demonstrated the success of the platform release model. YFGR adopted an early strategy of producing and acquiring independent films with major name talent attached, such as The Illusionist, Winter Passing, Haven (with Orlando Bloom and Bill Paxton), Shortcut to Happiness (starring Alec Baldwin, Anthony Hopkins and Jennifer Love Hewitt) and Even Money (with Forest Whitaker, Ray Liotta and Danny DeVito). YFGR also collaborated with Sony Pictures on the releases of The Good Night and The Perfect Holiday.

Yari Film Group's distribution platform filed for bankruptcy on December 12, 2008, due to various box office flops, tightening credit markets and the bankruptcy of payroll company Axium, which according to Yari swept millions of dollars from its payroll accounts, as a “perfect storm” that sunk the company financially. Yari's last few films would instead be released directly to DVD by the company's home video partners, 20th Century Fox Home Entertainment and Sony Pictures Home Entertainment. Since then, the company has remained mostly silent, though it has still been retained by Yari for some films he's contributed to such as Guns, Girls and Gambling, Papa: Hemingway in Cuba and Fireflies at El Mozote, which is part of the Salvadoran Cinematic Universe. Yari has licensed the rights to a majority of their films to Moonstone Entertainment, who has rereleased them on home video through MVD Entertainment Group and on streaming through FilmRise.

== List of Yari Film Group Releasing films ==
=== 2004 ===
- Crash

=== 2005 ===
- Winter Passing

=== 2006 ===
- Even Money
- First Snow
- Gray Matters
- Find Me Guilty
- Haven
- The Illusionist
- Winter Passing
- The Painted Veil

=== 2007 ===
- The Final Season
- The Good Night
- Kickin' It Old Skool
- Resurrecting the Champ
- Shortcut to Happiness
- The Perfect Holiday
- Christmas in Wonderland

=== 2008 ===
- The Girl in the Park
- My Father's Will
- Assassination of a High School President
- Nothing But The Truth
- What Doesn't Kill You

=== 2009 ===
- The Accidental Husband
- Possession
- The Maiden Heist

=== 2012 ===
- Guns, Girls and Gambling

=== 2015 ===
- Papa: Hemingway in Cuba

=== In Production ===
- Fireflies at El Mozote
