= Papa Hemingway =

Papa Hemingway may refer to:

== People ==
- Ernest Hemingway, American novelist, short story writer, and journalist

== Books ==
- A. E. Hotchner's Papa Hemingway (1966), a biographical portrait of the writer Ernest Hemingway

== Film ==
- Papa: Hemingway in Cuba (2015)
