= Assassination of a High School President =

2008 American comedy film

- DVD release cover
- Directed by: Brett Simon
- Written by: Tim Calpin; Kevin Jakubowski
- Produced by: Bob Yari; Roy Lee; Doug Davison
- Starring: Reece Thompson; Mischa Barton; Bruce Willis; Michael Rapaport; Kathryn Morris; Emily Meade; Josh Pais
- Cinematography: M. David Mullen
- Edited by: William M. Anderson; Thomas J. Nordberg
- Music by: Daniele Luppi
- Production company: Vertigo Entertainment
- Distributed by: Yari Film Group
- Release date: January 17, 2008 (Sundance Film Festival)
- Running time: 93 minutes
- Country: United States
- Language: English

Assassination of a High School President is a 2008 American neo noir comedy film directed by Brett Simon and starring Reece Thompson, Bruce Willis, Mischa Barton, Emily Meade and Michael Rapaport. It was written by Tim Calpin and Kevin Jakubowski. It premiered at the 2008 Sundance Film Festival.

The film was originally scheduled for a limited theatrical release on February 27, 2009, but the release was postponed following the bankruptcy of its distributor, Yari Film Group. It was released on DVD in the United States on October 6, 2009.

== Plot ==
Robert "Bobby" Funke is a less than popular high school sophomore with a dream to get into Northwestern University's summer journalism program. Although Funke claims he is a great writer, he has never finished an article for his school newspaper. Editor-in-chief Clara Diaz assigns Funke to do an article on Paul Moore, the student council president and star of the school's basketball team. Funke is unable to get a story out of Paul and is bullied by Paul's friends.

Principal Kirkpatrick discovers that the upcoming SAT booklets have been stolen from a safe in his office. Kirkpatrick rounds up the "usual suspects" of misfits, including Funke. The group is innocent, but Kirkpatrick warns them to watch their step.

When senior Francesca Facchini solicits Funke's help tracking down the stolen SATs, Funke slowly uncovers a story. His investigation links Paul to the crime, which he writes in an article for the school paper. Kirkpatrick forces Paul to open his locker and the SATs fall out.

Funke becomes one of the most popular kids at school. Clara decides to submit his article to Northwestern, which earns him a scholarship to the summer program. Funke wins the respect of everyone, from Principal Kirkpatrick to Francesca, who asks him to a school dance.

Paul confronts Funke, proclaiming his innocence, stating that he was already accepted to Cornell on a sports scholarship and did not need the SATs. Funke begins to wonder if he is just a pawn in a conspiracy, and he investigates Paul's shady friends, all members of the student council. He discovers their involvement with drug dealing. The council had actually stolen the SATs along with other tests throughout the year, modifying the marks of the best students to make them doubt their test-taking abilities and turn to the council for "study drugs". Paul was not in on the crime, so group ringleader Marlon Piazza had Paul framed to avoid being caught, while Marlon's step-sibling and sex partner, Francesca, led Funke along to keep him from finding out the truth.

Funke confronts the council in the principal's office. Marlon threatens to have Funke thrown out the window and frame it as a suicide, but his threat and confession are heard on the school's intercom system, which Funke had secretly activated. Kirkpatrick rushes into the office, followed by Francesca. Francesca attempts to gain Funke's trust, only to be shut down and left to her punishment.

== Cast ==
- Reece Thompson as Robert "Bobby" Funke (pronounced as Funk by himself, and Funky by the rest of the school)
- Mischa Barton as Francesca Fachini
- Bruce Willis as Principal Jared T. Kirkpatrick
- Michael Rapaport as Coach Z
- Kathryn Morris as Nurse Platt
- Melonie Diaz as Clara Díaz
- Josh Pais as Padre Newell
- Luke Grimes as Marlon Piazza
- Patrick Taylor as Paul Moore
- Aaron Himelstein as Tad Goltz
- Joseph Perrino as Dutch Middleton
- John Magaro as Cipriato
- Robin Lord Taylor as Alex Schneider
- Vincent Piazza as Ricky Delacruz
- Zoë Kravitz as Valerie Torres
- Zachary Booth as Rocky Raccoon
- Adam Pally as Freddy Bismark
- Tanya Fischer as Sam Landis
- Josh Caras as Marty Mullen
- Zach Roerig as Matt Mullen
- Emily Meade as Tiffany Ashwood
- Gabrielle Brennan as Chrissy Moore
- Jake Weary as Hall Monitor
- Laura Ford as DMV Lady
- Marc John Jefferies as Elliott Duncan
- Quinn Shephard as Eye-patch girl
- Tomas Deckaj as Ben Stridel

== Inspiration ==
The fictional St. Donovan's High School was inspired by the Catholic high schools of writers Tim Calpin and Kevin Jakubowski. Calpin attended Scranton Preparatory School in Scranton, Pennsylvania, while Jakubowski attended Fenwick High School in Oak Park, Illinois. The look of the school and style of dress were drawn from these high schools. The school mascot (Friar) and the school emblem (cross of the Dominican Order) was derived from Fenwick. The movie was shot on location at Bayonne High School in Bayonne, New Jersey.

== Release ==
The film premiered at the 2008 Sundance Film Festival to a positive reception. It was initially planned for a limited theatrical release on February 17, 2009, followed by a wide release on March 27. However, due to Yari Film Group's releasing division filing for bankruptcy in December 2008, the film lost a distributor, preventing the possibility of a theatrical release. In response to the news of the film's shelving, several film journalists advocated that the film should at least receive a limited theatrical release, and encouraged fans to support the film on social networking sites such as Facebook.

In May 2009, Barton spoke to reporters about the future of the film: "They just can't get the funding to distribute it. The movie is complete and ready to go but there is no release date set and it is not looking likely there will be one."

In Russia, the film was not released to theaters but premiered on May 14, 2009, on the Russian free-to-air channel TNT TV.

In August 2009, despite fan protests, Sony Pictures Home Entertainment announced that instead of a theatrical release, the film would be released direct-to-DVD on October 6, 2009.

Over the following months, the film was released in various markets, including in April 2010 in Portugal by Ecofilmes.

== Reception ==
On the review aggregator website Rotten Tomatoes, 55% of 11 critics' reviews are positive, with an average rating of 5.4/10.

Writing for MTV, Larry Carroll highly praised the film, favorably comparing it to Rushmore, The Usual Suspects, Chinatown, Sixteen Candles and Fast Times at Ridgemont High. Carroll added that "the film's central mystery keeps you guessing intelligently, but brilliantly balances every reference to Nietzsche with a joke about a chocolate swirly." Carroll also complimented the casting choices, commenting that Willis is "hilariously intense" and Barton "brings the femme fatale back for a new generation."

Stephen Farber of The Hollywood Reporter cited the film's lack of "novel insights" but praised the performance of two of its actors, Thompson is "completely convincing" and Barton is "captivating".
