= Red Sun =

1971 Franco-Italian Spaghetti Western film by Terence Young

- Theatrical release poster
- Directed by: Terence Young
- Screenplay by: Denne Bart Petitclerc; William Roberts; Lawrence Roman
- Story by: Laird Koenig
- Produced by: Robert Dorfmann; Ted Richmond
- Starring: Charles Bronson; Ursula Andress; Toshirō Mifune; Alain Delon; Capucine
- Cinematography: Henri Alekan
- Edited by: Johnny Dwyre
- Music by: Maurice Jarre
- Production companies: Les Films Corona; Oceania Produzioni Internazionali Cinematografiche; Producciones Balcázar S.A.
- Distributed by: Les Films Corona
- Release dates: 15 September 1971 (France); 26 October 1971 (Italy); 20 December 1971 (Spain); 9 June 1972 (United States)
- Running time: 112 minutes
- Countries: France; Italy; Spain
- Language: English
- Box office: 3,300,488 admissions (France)

Red Sun (French: Soleil rouge, Italian: Sole rosso) is a 1971 spaghetti Western film directed by Terence Young and starring Charles Bronson, Toshirō Mifune, Alain Delon, Ursula Andress, and Capucine. The Franco-Italian international co-production was filmed in Spain by the British director Young, with a screenplay by Denne Bart Petitclerc, William Roberts, and Lawrence Roman from a story by Laird Koenig. The film was released in the United States on 9 June 1972.

== Plot ==
In 1870, Link Stuart and Gauche are leaders of a gang of bandits who decide to rob $400,000 from a train. There, a Japanese ambassador is on his way to Washington, carrying a ceremonial tachi sword meant as a gift for the president. Gauche steals the gold-handled tachi and kills one of the ambassador's samurai bodyguards. By Gauche's order, the bandits double-cross Link by throwing dynamite into the train car he is in, leaving him for dead. Before Gauche leaves, the surviving samurai bodyguard, Kuroda, asks his name and swears to kill him.

After Link is revived, the ambassador instructs him to assist Kuroda in tracking down Gauche. Kuroda has one week to kill Gauche and recover the sword; if he fails, both Kuroda and the ambassador will have to commit seppuku for allowing the tachi to be stolen and leaving the dead samurai unavenged. Link reluctantly agrees to help Kuroda. Once they set off in pursuit of the gang, Link repeatedly attempts to elude Kuroda, to no avail.

Gauche and four gang members bury the money, then Gauche kills them so only he knows the hiding place. He pays off others, who go their own way, and the remaining gang stays with him. While tracking Gauche, Kuroda reveals that his countrymen's ancient links to their own culture and the samurai's values are disappearing, and he believes the only way to honor his ancestors and his own way of life is to bring back the sword. The two approach a ranch that has been taken over by some of the gang members, kill them and take their horses. Link then manages to escape Kuroda, but has a change of heart and returns, having grown to respect the strict code by which Kuroda lives. He warns Kuroda, however, that he will kill him if Gauche dies before revealing where the money is hidden.

Continuing the pursuit, Link decides the best way to get to Gauche is through his lover, Cristina. The duo travel to a brothel in the town of San Lucas, where she resides, and seal her inside a room. The next morning, four of Gauche's men arrive to fetch Christina. Link and Kuroda kill three of them, and the fourth is sent back to Gauche with the message that they will exchange Christina for the stolen sword and Link's share of the robbery spoils. The switch is to take place at an abandoned mission a day's ride away.

En route to the exchange, Christina escapes from the duo and runs into a band of Comanches, killing one as he assaults her. In retribution, the leader has her bound and her neck tied with wet rawhide, which slowly strangles Christina as the sun dries it out. Link and Kuroda attack the Comanches, killing most of them and driving the leader away.

At the mission, Link and Kuroda are ambushed by Gauche and his men. Despite Christina's protests, Gauche tells one of his men to shoot Link. Just then, the Comanches attack, forcing the rivals to fight on the same side. They repel the attack, first from inside the mission, then, after it is burned down, in the surrounding cane fields. After all the Comanches are dead or have fled, only Link, Kuroda, Cristina, and Gauche remain alive.

Gauche faces off against Link, who has run out of bullets. Kuroda prepares to kill Gauche but hesitates, remembering what Link wanted. Gauche shoots Kuroda while Link seizes the opportunity to grab a rifle. Gauche is confident that Link will leave him alive to learn where the money is hidden. Link, however, having decided that Kuroda's honor is more important, kills him and promises the dying samurai that he will return the sword to the ambassador. After Kuroda is buried, Link rejects Cristina's offer to join her to track down the money. Shortly before the ambassador's train arrives, he hangs the sword from the telegraph wire in front of the station, fulfilling his pledge.

== Cast ==
- Charles Bronson as Link Stuart
- Ursula Andress as Cristina
- Toshirō Mifune as Kuroda Jubei
- Alain Delon as Gauche
- Capucine as Pepita
- Barta Barri as Paco
- Lee Burton as Mace
- Anthony Dawson as Hyatt
- Gianni Medici as Miguel
- George W. Lycan as Sheriff Stone
- Luc Merenda as Chato
- Tetsu Nakamura as the Japanese Ambassador
- Mónica Randall as Maria
- José Nieto as Murdered Farmer
- Julio Peña as Peppe
- Ricardo Palacios as Pogo

== Production ==
The project was announced in 1968, with Toshirō Mifune attached early on. Ted Richmond Productions was going to make it for Warner Bros.-Seven Arts. Clint Eastwood was mentioned as a possible early co-star. The film was eventually made by France's Corona Films, headed by Robert Dorfman and Richmond.

Charles Bronson starred in The Magnificent Seven, an American remake of Seven Samurai, in which Mifune had appeared. Film director John Landis has an uncredited appearance as a henchman killed by a Comanche's arrow to the gut in the native ambush. Bronson was extremely popular in Japanese theaters at this time, and Red Sun set an attendance record in Tokyo, playing for a record 35 weeks in its first run engagements.

== Reception ==
On the review aggregator website Rotten Tomatoes, 40% of 5 critics' reviews are positive.
