= Resurrecting the Champ =

2007 film by Rod Lurie

- Theatrical release poster
- Directed by: Rod Lurie
- Screenplay by: Michael Bortman; Allison Burnett
- Based on: "Resurrecting the Champ" by J. R. Moehringer
- Produced by: Mike Medavoy; Bob Yari; Marc Frydman; Rod Lurie
- Starring: Samuel L. Jackson; Josh Hartnett; Kathryn Morris; Alan Alda; Rachel Nichols; David Paymer; Teri Hatcher
- Cinematography: Adam Kane
- Edited by: Sarah Boyd
- Music by: Larry Groupé
- Production companies: Phoenix Pictures; Alberta Film Entertainment; Battleplan Productions; Yari Film Group
- Distributed by: Yari Film Group; SEVEN24 Films
- Release date: August 24, 2007
- Running time: 112 minutes
- Country: United States
- Language: English
- Budget: $13 million
- Box office: $3.2 million

Resurrecting the Champ is a 2007 American sports drama film directed by Rod Lurie and written by Michael Bortman and Allison Burnett, based on a Los Angeles Times Magazine article entitled "Resurrecting the Champ" by J. R. Moehringer. The film centers on a fictionalized former athlete portrayed by Samuel L. Jackson, living on the streets of Denver, who attempts to impersonate the life and career of former professional heavyweight boxer Bob Satterfield. The ensemble cast also features Josh Hartnett, Alan Alda, David Paymer, and Teri Hatcher.

The film was a co-production between the motion picture studios of Phoenix Pictures, Alberta Film Entertainment, Battleplan Productions, and the Yari Film Group. Theatrically, it was commercially distributed by the Yari Film Group, while in the home video rental market it was distributed by 20th Century Fox Home Entertainment. Resurrecting the Champ explores professional ethics, journalism and athletics. On September 25, 2007, the original motion picture soundtrack was released by the Rykodisc record label. The film score was composed and orchestrated by musicians Larry Groupé and Blake Hazard. Indie Rock band The Submarines also contributed a musical track to the score. In 2008, the film was nominated for an ESPY Award for Best Sports Movie as well as a Young Artist Award in the category of Best Performance in a Feature Film, Young Actor Age Ten or Younger.

Resurrecting the Champ premiered in theaters nationwide in the United States on August 24, 2007 grossing $3,172,573 in domestic ticket receipts. The film took in an additional $69,854 in business through international release for a combined worldwide total of $3,242,427. Preceding its initial screening in cinemas, the film was generally met with positive critical reviews. With its initial foray into the home video marketplace; the widescreen DVD edition of the film featuring theatrical trailers, cast and crew interviews, and commentary with director Lurie among other highlights, was released in the United States on April 8, 2008.

== Plot ==
Erik Kernan Jr. is a young fledgling journalist employed by The Denver Times. Frustrated, Kernan struggles with his supervising editor Ralph Metz concerning rudimentary coverage of his articles related to professional sports. Metz views Kernan's editorial work as bland and uninspiring, considering that his recently deceased father was a famous sportscaster. Kernan is separated from his wife, Joyce, who also works at the newspaper, and worries that he might be losing touch with their young son, Teddy.

In an alley near the Denver Coliseum, three rowdy young men taunt an elderly homeless man, who calls himself "Champ" and claims to have been a professional boxer. As the men begin to assault him, Kernan, leaving a boxing match he was covering at the venue, comes to his aid. Kernan eventually learns that Champ was once a famous former heavyweight boxing contender, Bob Satterfield.

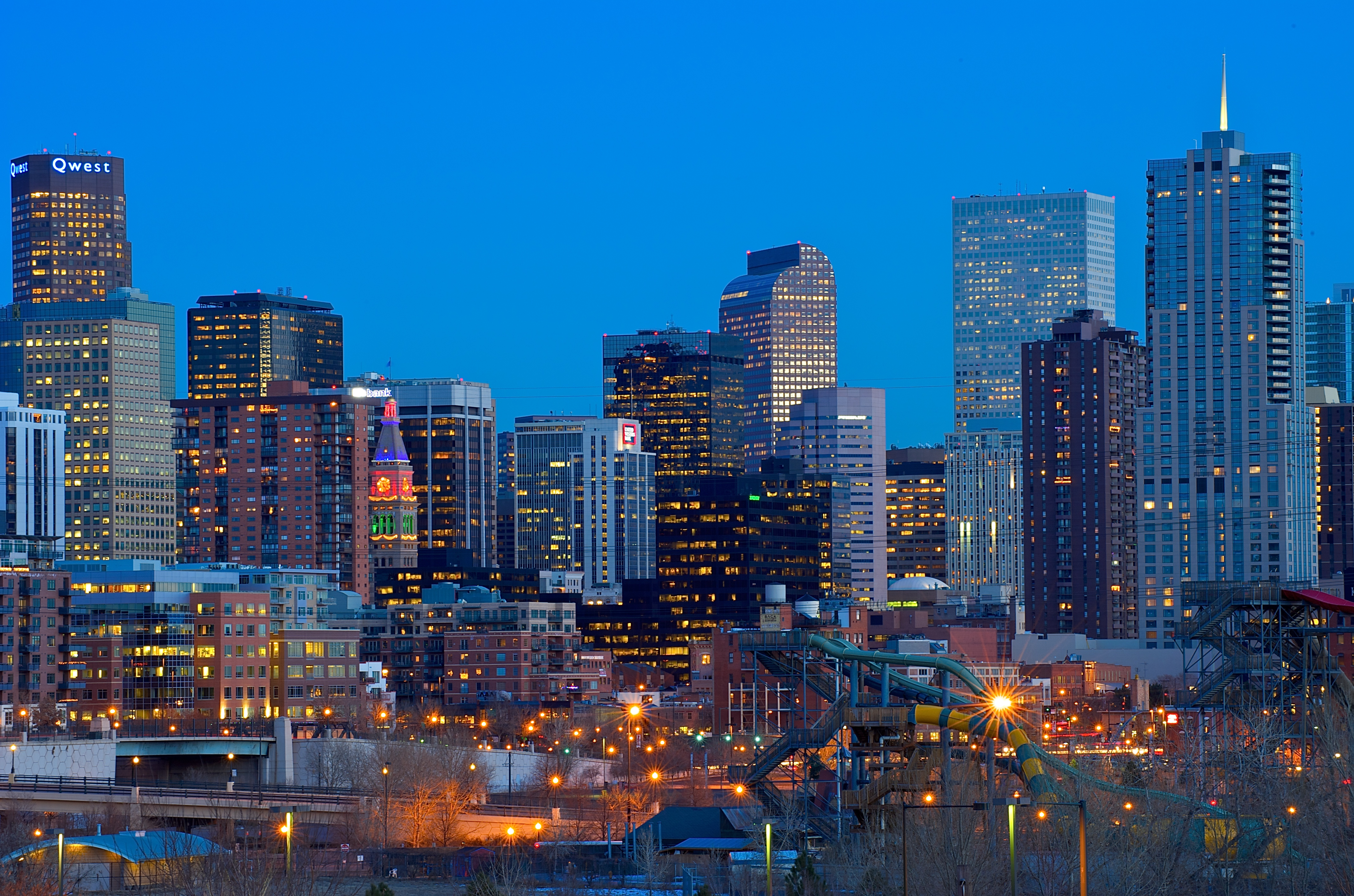
Denver, Colorado, where the provincial story takes place.

During an interview with a magazine publisher named Whitley, Kernan informs him that he has an influential story about Satterfield. At the same time, Champ is reluctant to cooperate with any biographical piece, claiming the memories are too painful for him. To gain Champ's confidence for the chronicle, Kernan recruits an associate at the newspaper, Polly, to assist him in retrieving information about his past. He also sincerely tries to help Champ reconcile with his son and ex-wife, seeing his possible future reflected in that family, one which he’s desperate to avoid.

The magazine ultimately publishes Kernan's article. It wins acclaim from readers and journalists alike. The story even draws the attention of a TV personality from Showtime, Flak, who boldly suggests it should be nominated for a Pulitzer Prize. But the intense publicity brings Kernan into contact with elderly folk who knew Satterfield personally, and are adamant that he's deceased. Kernan later learns that Champ is a lesser known boxing contender, Tommy Kincaid, whom Satterfield once defeated in the ring. He makes a conscious choice and decides to inform his editors about the profile error. However, before he can do so, he learns that he and the newspaper are being sued by Satterfield's son, Robert. Satterfield Jr. is angered, since it had been long known to a number of people that Champ had a lengthy history of impersonating his father. Metz derides Kernan for not having done due diligence in examining Champ's authenticity regarding his past. It is also discovered that Champ’s real son joined a gang when he discovered his father’s real identity and was devastatingly disappointed, and was killed in a street fight, leading to Champ’s marriage failing and him ending up homeless for 20 years, due to his ex-wife being unable to forgive him, and Champ being unable to forgive himself.

Satterfield Jr. is later appeased with a proposal by Kernan to write another article retracting his mistake, and to include personal journalistic material about the elder Satterfield which he long wanted someone to articulate. Meanwhile, Champ finally gets his chance against real former heavyweight champion boxer—and former opponent of both Satterfield and Kincaid—Rocky Marciano, who taunts him into a fight, a “sparring match” for their “comeback”. During the fight, an injury to his head causes Champ to see Marciano in his prime again when they last fought, and he gets scared. Even though he insists he’s done impersonating Satterfield, Marciano insists on finishing the fight, not liking that even in their old age, he’s still getting shown up by his old sparring partner (Kincaid incidentally had broken Marciano’s nose back in the day, which led to Marciano having nosebleed problems since), and it escalates from a sparring match into a grudge match. Champ wins the fight, proclaiming victory under his real name and title, but tragically suffers a heart attack and dies alone in the streets. He’s given a proper Christian burial; understandably it’s a small attendance, but it’s filled with people who genuinely cared for him (including his ex-wife Betty). As Kernan does his best to honor Champ’s memory in his subsequent article, considering him a friend despite the lie he told (which he did only so that his son would be proud of him, another reflection of Kernan’s own behavior), Kernan is also gratified to know that Teddy will be proud of his father, even if he does not know the famous people he once claimed to know. He decides to continue his job as a journalist, he and Joyce reconcile, they have another son together, and Teddy begins teaching his little brother what Champ taught him.

== Cast ==
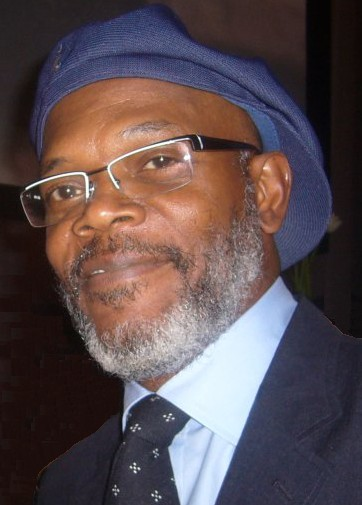
Actor Samuel L. Jackson who portrayed the protagonist "Champ".

- Samuel L. Jackson as "Champ"/"Bob Satterfield"/Tommy Kincaid
- Josh Hartnett as Erik Kernan Jr.
- Kathryn Morris as Joyce Kernan
- Dakota Goyo as Teddy Kernan
- Alan Alda as Ralph Metz
- Rachel Nichols as Polly
- David Paymer as Whitely
- Teri Hatcher as Andrea Flak
- Kristen Shaw as Perlmutter
- Nick Sandow as Marciano
- Harry J. Lennix as Bob Satterfield Jr.

== Production ==
=== Filming ===
For logistical and monetary reasons, director Lurie chose to film primarily in Calgary, Alberta. Critical exterior shots were also filmed in Denver, Colorado, where the story itself is based. For some scenes, production filmed at a real homeless shelter called The Mustard Seed, as around forty of the shelter's residents and guests were hired to stand in as film extras. Additional boxing flashbacks were filmed at the Corral Arena at the Calgary Stampede Grounds.

=== Music ===
The original motion picture soundtrack for Resurrecting the Champ, was released by the Rykodisc music label on September 25, 2007. The film score was composed and orchestrated by a number of musicians including, Larry Groupé, Blake Hazard, and Neville Ivey.

Resurrecting the Champ [Music from the Film]

Film score by Larry Groupé
- Released: 09/25/2007
- Length: 43:45
- Label: Rykodisc

Resurrecting the Champ [Music from the Film]
No.	Title	Length
1.	"Old School"	1:16
2.	"Grossingers"	1:58
3.	"Babe I like your walk"	3:13
4.	"The Truth"	1:54
5.	"Shadow of my Father"	2:32
6.	"Backyard Talk"	1:36
7.	"Crossroads"	2:43
8.	"Ready or not"	4:02
9.	"I'm Champ"	2:32
10.	"Champ sees old video"	1:09
11.	"Career Day"	1:25
12.	"The Right Thing"	1:01
13.	"Five Points"	1:31
14.	"Zulu Segue"	5:16
15.	"For the Record"	1:30
16.	"Hot off the presses"	1:28
17.	"Some Mistakes"	2:34
18.	"Champ Dies"	1:04
19.	"Land of Quiet Poems"	2:59
20.	"Resurrecting Champ"	2:48
Total length:		43:45

== Release ==
=== Home media ===
The film was released on DVD on April 8, 2008.

== Reception ==
=== Critical response ===
Among mainstream critics in the U.S., the film received generally mixed to positive reviews. Rotten Tomatoes reported that 61% of 116 sampled critics gave the film a positive review, with an average score of 6.1 out of 10. At Metacritic, which assigns a weighted average out of 100 to critics' reviews, Resurrecting the Champ received a score of 55 based on 28 reviews. The film was nominated for an ESPY Award in the category of Best Sports Movie in 2008. It also received a nomination for a Young Artist Award for actor Dakota Goyo in the category of Best Performance in a Feature Film — Young Actor Age Ten or Younger.

Jackson disappears into his role, completely convincing, but then he usually is. What a fine actor. He avoids pitfalls like making Champ a maudlin tearjerker, looking for pity. He's realistic, even philosophical, about his life and what happened to him.

— Roger Ebert, writing for the Chicago Sun-Times

Mick LaSalle, writing in the San Francisco Chronicle, channeled with a mild upbeat sentiment affirming, "The fun of watching Jackson is watching him think, but here he's playing a man whose mind is half gone. Jackson conveys that as well as one could hope, but he's boxing with one hand and four fingers tied behind his back." Left a bit impressed, J.R. Jones writing in the Chicago Reader, surmised how actor Hartnett "really connects with the role of a dull-witted but grandly ambitious Denver Post reporter who hits on a great story when he crosses paths with a foggy homeless man (Samuel L. Jackson) who claims he's fearsome heavyweight boxer." In a mixed to positive review, Carrie Rickey of The Philadelphia Inquirer, relayed that motion picture "has morals that Winston Churchill and Jake LaMotta both could love. It suggests that true success is going from failure to failure without a loss of enthusiasm. And it implies that the most decisive bouts are those that take place outside the ring." Stephen Holden of The New York Times, emphatically expressed that the film "captures the hard-boiled tone of a big-city newsroom almost perfectly." He asserted that the film was a "cautionary fable that every journalistic go-getter dreaming of front-page bylines would do well to heed."

The film however, was not without its detractors. Writing for Entertainment Weekly, film critic Lisa Schwarzbaum viewed the filmmakers as not content enough "to make this a story of two imperfect men. Instead, speechy monologues on the responsibilities of journalism, the particular evil of infotainment (represented by Teri Hatcher as a she-devil from Showtime), and the gooey sanctity of the bond between fathers and sons all but nullify Jackson's zesty performance." In similar fashion, columnist Joanne Kaufman writing for The Wall Street Journal emphasized, "Samuel L. Jackson is a knock-out as a broken-down, boozed-up former boxer in the fact-based 'Resurrecting the Champ.' The movie itself — which deals (not very interestingly) with the issue of journalistic integrity and (very predictably) with father-son relationships — doesn't pack much of a wallop." In the Chicago Sun-Times, noted film critic Roger Ebert voiced his enthusiasm with the picture observing, "There are developments in this movie that I don't want to hint at, especially since they surprised me, and you should have the same pleasure. They call into question, let us say, people's motives for doing things, and what happens when two people have the misfortune to find that their motives are a good fit." Columnist Marjorie Baumgarten of The Austin Chronicle professed that the film was "a sentimental drama about fathers and sons and the emotional distances between them. Though most of these narrative facets provide interesting fodder, none are satisfactorily developed creating a hodgepodge effect. Were it not for the solid cast performances, and in particular the showy Jackson performance as the Champ of the title, the visually bland movie would warrant little attention."

'Resurrecting the Champ,' which is never short of mesmerizing when Mr. Jackson is on screen — in fairness, he's got all the good lines — loses power when, by dint of a plot twist, attention turns to the none-too-compelling Erik. The result is a sentimental by-the-numbers tale of paternal shame and redemption that could be called 'Resurrecting the Daddy.'

— Joanne Kaufman, writing in The Wall Street Journal

For the most part, satisfied with the quality of the motion picture, Wesley Morris of The Boston Globe said that "If most boxing movies are about redemption, 'Resurrecting the Champ' is a boxing movie that goes to exasperating lengths to redeem its boxing writer." He declared the film to be a "one-sided Hollywood claptrap about honesty and valor". John Anderson writing in Variety took a neutral position exclaiming, "Although helmer Rod Lurie circles a lot of thorny issues in this morality tale of a middleweight contender-turned-homeless vagrant and the reporter who rescues him from obscurity, the plan of attack is overly sentimentalized and the execution is slack. If not for Samuel L. Jackson's performance as the ravaged boxer, 'Champ' would be of limited interest." Critic Jeff Vice of the Deseret News accounted for the fact that the film wasn't "quite a knockout." He stated, "if this sports drama was a pugilistic bout, it would have to go to the scorecards just to get a favorable decision." But in summary he concluded, "Director Rod Lurie and screenwriters Michael Bortman and Allison Burnett based this tale on a true story, and parts of it do ring true. The explorations of the strained father-son dynamic and a message about redemption are well-done."

=== Box office ===
Resurrecting the Champ premiered in cinemas on August 24, 2007 in wide release throughout the United States. During that weekend, the film opened in 15th place grossing $1,667,659 in business showing at 1,605 locations. The film Superbad opened in 1st place during that weekend with $18,044,369 in revenue. The film's revenue dropped by 66% in its second week of release, earning $554,616. For that particular weekend, the film fell to 25th place with a lower opening theater count at 1,295 cinemas. The slasher horror film Halloween unseated Superbad to open in 1st place with $26,362,367 in box office business. During its final week in release, Resurrecting the Champ opened in a dismal 111th place grossing a marginal $1,897 in revenue. For that weekend period, The Game Plan starring Dwayne Johnson opened in 1st place with $22,950,971 in box office receipts. Resurrecting the Champ went on to top out domestically at $3,172,573 in total ticket sales through an initial 6-week theatrical run. For 2007 as a whole, the film would cumulatively rank at a box office performance position of 201.

== See also ==
- List of boxing films
- Bob Satterfield
