= Nothing but the Truth (2008 American film) =

- Original poster
- Directed by: Rod Lurie
- Written by: Rod Lurie
- Produced by: Rod Lurie; Bob Yari; Marc Frydman
- Starring: Kate Beckinsale; Matt Dillon; Angela Bassett; Alan Alda; Vera Farmiga
- Cinematography: Alik Sakharov
- Edited by: Sarah Boyd
- Music by: Larry Groupé
- Production companies: Yari Film Group; Battleplan Productions
- Distributed by: Yari Film Group; Freestyle Releasing
- Release dates: September 8, 2008 (TIFF); December 19, 2008 (New York premiere)
- Running time: 107 minutes
- Country: United States
- Language: English
- Budget: $11.5 million
- Box office: $409,832

Nothing but the Truth is a 2008 American political drama film written and directed by Rod Lurie. The film stars Kate Beckinsale, Matt Dillon, Angela Bassett, Alan Alda and Vera Farmiga. According to comments made by Lurie in The Truth Hurts, a bonus feature on the DVD release, his inspiration for the screenplay was the case of journalist Judith Miller, who in July 2005 was jailed for contempt of court for refusing to testify before a federal grand jury investigating a leak naming Valerie Plame as a covert CIA operative, but this was merely a starting point for what is primarily a fictional story. In an April 2009 interview, Lurie stressed: "I should say that the film is about neither of these women although certainly their stories as reported in the press went into the creation of their characters and the situation they find themselves in."

The film premiered at the Toronto International Film Festival on September 8, 2008. It was scheduled to open in New York City and Los Angeles on December 19, but because distributor Yari Film Group filed for Chapter 11 protection, it was never given a theatrical release.

== Plot ==
President Lyman is shot in an assassination attempt. In retaliation, the United States bombs Venezuela, accusing that country of instigating the attack.

Rachel Armstrong, an ambitious reporter for the Washington D.C. paper Capital Sun-Times, is preparing to publish a report that alleges that the Lyman administration knowingly lied to Congress and the American public by blaming Venezuela for the assassination attempt, and that the Administration received a CIA report by an operative who had investigated the Venezuela connection and found that they were not at all linked to the assassination attempt. The report also reveals that the CIA operative is Erica Van Doren, whose daughter Alison attends the same school as Timmy, Rachel's son. Rachel confronts Van Doren at a soccer match, and requests confirmation. Erica refuses to cooperate but gives herself away by losing her temper over "irresponsible journalists". Rachel, who has no doubts about the veracity of the report, publishes her story and it becomes front-page news with the full support of editor Bonnie Benjamin and legal counsel Avril Aaronson.

Because revealing a covert operative's identity is a treasonous offence if committed by a government employee, and because any individual leaking such sensitive and secret information constitutes a threat to national security, special Federal prosecutor Patton Dubois convenes a grand jury to identify and prosecute that person. But when Dubois asks her to name the government employee who was her source, she refuses to give any answer at all. A high-profile attorney, Albert Burnside, who was hired by the newspaper to defend Rachel and boasted that his personal friendship with Judge Hall will facilitate matters, is shocked when his client is jailed for contempt of court for failing to answer. Burnside admonishes the prosecutor for making "a big mistake", warning "sometimes a mistake is like wearing white after Labor Day, and sometimes a mistake is invading Russia in winter".

Days become weeks, weeks turn to months, and in the meantime Van Doren is murdered in front of her home by a political fanatic with a gun. Rachel is aggressed by inmates in prison, but still steadfastly defends the principle of confidentiality, a position that eventually estranges her husband Ray, who like Dubois imagines that she's protecting a government employee, alienates her young son Timmy, and costs her embattled newspaper millions of dollars in fines and legal fees. However, Dubois is only interested in Armstrong's original source. Armstrong pleads to Dubois that she could never give up her source as they would now be seen as responsible for the murder of Van Doren. Burnside even appeals her case before the Supreme Court, arguing that without protection of sources then there is no freedom of the press, perhaps ultimately no democracy, but the court decides against him 5–4, citing the overriding concern of national security.

Eventually, Judge Hall accepts that Armstrong will never give in and divulge her source. And so, convinced that incarcerating her can serve no useful purpose, and since she has not been convicted of any offense, decides to release her from jail. On the day she is released, Dubois has the U.S. Marshals arrest her, and charges her for obstruction of justice, and convinces her to take a deal for a shortened sentence rather than go to trial. She agrees to two years in prison, with the possibility of early parole for good behavior. As Armstrong is taken to the prison facility, she reminisces about her time as a volunteer at Timmy's school: Once, on a field trip, she spoke to Van Doren's daughter, Alison. Alison innocently mentioned that her mother worked for "the government", and had recently gone to Venezuela on "business", thus revealing her as the original source.

== Cast ==
- Kate Beckinsale as Rachel Armstrong
- Matt Dillon as Patton Dubois
- Alan Alda as Albert Burnside
- Vera Farmiga as Erica Van Doren
- Angela Bassett as Bonnie Benjamin
- David Schwimmer as Ray Armstrong
- Noah Wyle as Avril Aaronson
- Floyd Abrams as Judge Hall
- Preston Bailey as Timmy Armstrong
- Rod Lurie as Journalist

== Production ==
Attorney Floyd Abrams had argued for The New York Times and Judith Miller in the grand jury investigation of her report about Valerie Plame, and he was hired as a consultant on the film by screenwriter/director Rod Lurie, who was so impressed with his demeanor he cast Abrams as Judge Hall.

== Distribution ==
=== Release ===
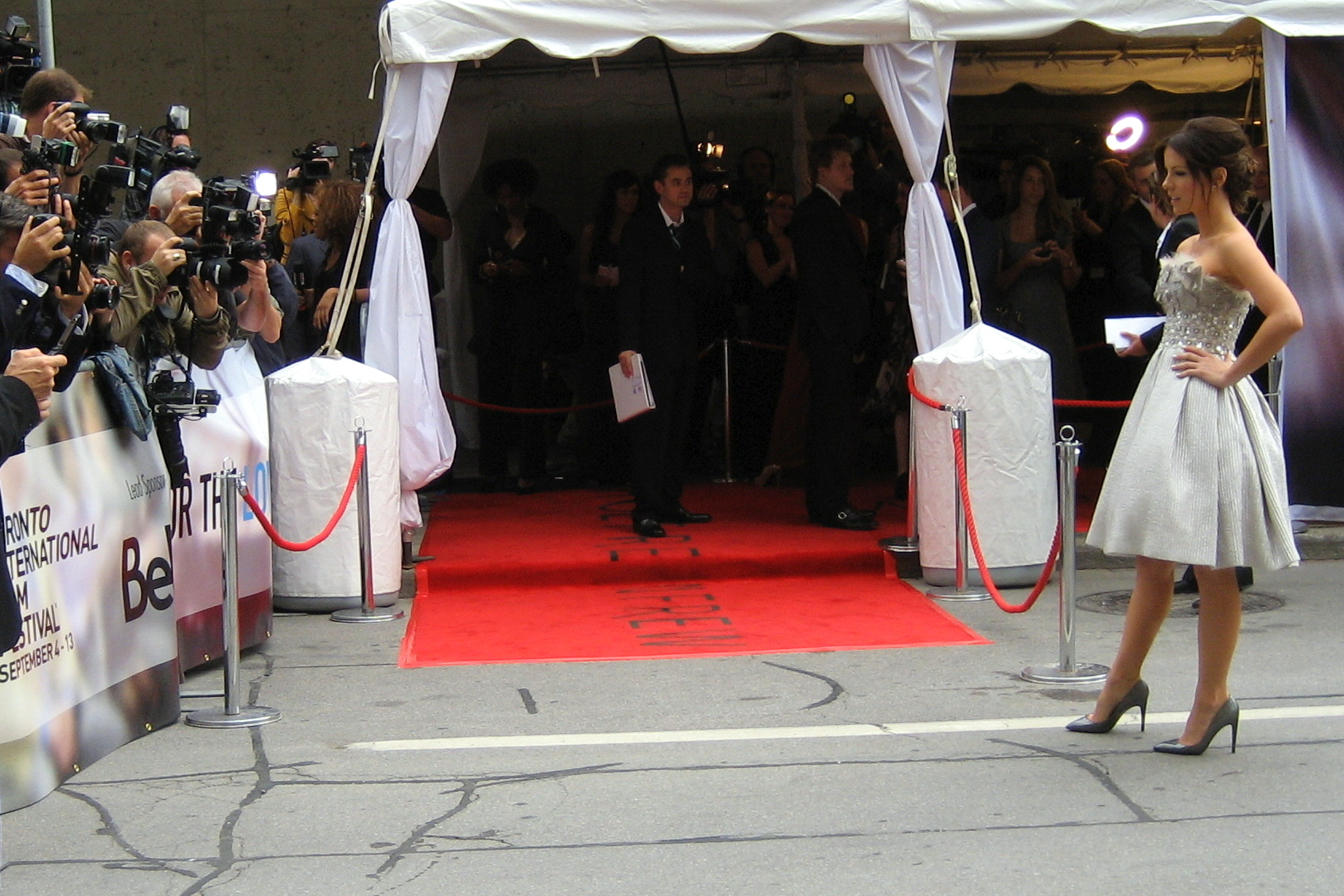
Kate Beckinsale at the premiere of Nothing but the Truth, at TIFF 2008

The film received its world premiere at the Toronto International Film Festival on September 8, 2008, with the cast in attendance. Cast members were also in attendance for a Boston area premiere on December 3, 2008, at Brandeis University. Yari Film Group was to give the film a limited release in the United States (Los Angeles and New York City) on December 19, 2008, but due to the Chapter 11 protection that was filed by the company, Nothing but the Truth was pulled from its scheduled date and has never been released in theaters.

=== Home media ===
Sony Pictures Home Entertainment released the film on DVD on April 28, 2009.

== Reception ==
=== Box office ===
The film opened in several international markets despite its distribution struggles in the United States. It made $409,832 at the foreign box office, with the biggest intake from Italy, where it made $223,130.

=== Critical response ===
Although the film never officially opened in theatres, several critics who had seen it in advance screenings nonetheless published their reviews. As of June 2020, the film holds an 82% approval rating on the review aggregator website Rotten Tomatoes, based on 60 reviews with an average rating of 6.76 out of 10. The site's critical consensus reads, "A well-crafted political thriller, Nothing but the Truth features a strong cast that helps the real-life drama make an effortless transition to the big screen." On Metacritic, the film has a score of 64 out of 100, based on 12 reviews, indicating "generally favorable reviews".

Manohla Dargis of The New York Times thought the "confusing film mixes familiar plot points with some grievous nonsense, most of which involves the two women's irritatingly distracting home lives. That's too bad for all sorts of reasons, including this one: when not cooing inanities at pipsqueaks, the actresses are pretty good, both together and individually. There's pleasure in watching them go manolo a manolo against each other, particularly Ms. Farmiga, who fills out her size 0 with macho swagger. Despite a shaky start, Ms. Beckinsale does eventually look the part of the harassed and haggard heroine, if largely by not wearing any eye makeup."

Not all reviews were positive as Los Angeles Times critic Sam Adams observed the film "isn't ripped from the headlines so much as it's pasted together like a ransom note, using scraps so small their origins are indiscernible. The obvious inspiration for the story of a newspaper reporter who is jailed for refusing to reveal her sources is the Valerie Plame affair, and for a while the details match up. But from there, Lurie spins off into invention like a Law & Order writer on deadline, scrambling the issues so thoroughly it's no longer clear what, if anything, the movie is meant to address."

Peter Travers of Rolling Stone rated the film three out of four stars and commented: "Lurie is expert at springing surprises and getting the best out of a first-rate cast. Beckinsale excels at finding the chinks in Rachel's armor. Farmiga goes so deep into her character you can feel her nerve endings. And Alda is simply superb as a lawyer whose peacock vanity about his designer wardrobe hardly prepares you for his moving argument for principles before the Supreme Court." He added: "Lurie has crafted a different kind of thriller, one with a mind and a heart." In reviewing the DVD release, Roger Ebert of the Chicago Sun-Times awarded it 3.5 out of four stars and called it "a finely crafted film of people and ideas, of the sort more common before the movie mainstream became a sausage factory. It respects the intelligence of the audience, it contains real drama, it earns its suspense, and it has a point to make."

=== Accolades ===
Year	Award	Category	Recipient(s)	Result
2008	Women Film Critics Circle	Best Equality of the Sexes	Nothing but the Truth	Won
2009	Critics' Choice Movie Awards	Best Actress	Kate Beckinsale	Nominated
2009	Critics' Choice Movie Awards	Best Supporting Actress	Vera Farmiga	Nominated
2010	Saturn Awards	Best DVD or Blu-ray Release	Nothing but the Truth	Won
