= Mind Games (1989 film) =

- Theatrical release poster
- Directed by: Bob Yari
- Written by: Kenneth Dorward
- Produced by: Louie Lawless; Randolf Turrow
- Starring: Maxwell Caulfield; Edward Albert; Shawn Weatherly; Matt Norero
- Cinematography: Arnie Sirlin
- Edited by: Robert Gordon
- Music by: David Campbell
- Production companies: MTA; Persik Productions
- Distributed by: Metro-Goldwyn-Mayer
- Release date: March 3, 1989
- Running time: 93 minutes
- Country: United States
- Language: English

Mind Games is a 1989 American thriller film directed by Bob Yari and written by Kenneth Dorward. The film stars Maxwell Caulfield, Edward Albert, Shawn Weatherly and Matt Norero. The film was released on March 3, 1989, by Metro-Goldwyn-Mayer.

== Plot ==
Rita and Dana Lund's marriage is in a crisis, Rita's frustrated from being just a housewife. To save their marriage, they set out for a camping trip through California with their son. At a camping site they meet the hitch-hiker Eric, who befriends their son. Against Rita's will, Dana takes him with them, not knowing that he's a brutal psychopath who'll force their son to participate in his nightly trips of vandalism.

== Cast ==
- Maxwell Caulfield as Eric Garrison
- Edward Albert as Dana Lund
- Shawn Weatherly as Rita Lund
- Matt Norero as Kevin Lund
