= Kickin' It Old Skool =

- Promotional poster
- Directed by: Harvey Glazer
- Written by: Trace Slobotkin; Josh Siegal; Dylan Morgan
- Produced by: Phillip Glasser; Bob Yari; Jamie Kennedy; John J. Hermansen
- Starring: Jamie Kennedy; Maria Menounos; Michael Rosenbaum; Christopher McDonald
- Cinematography: Robert M. Stevens
- Edited by: Sandy S. Solowitz
- Music by: James L. Venable
- Production companies: Yari Film Group; Jizzy Entertainment; Hi-Def Entertainment
- Distributed by: Yari Film Group Releasing
- Release date: April 27, 2007
- Running time: 108 minutes
- Country: United States
- Language: English
- Budget: $25.7 million
- Box office: $4.7 million

Kickin' It Old Skool is a 2007 American comedy film directed by Harvey Glazer, written by Trace Slobotkin, and starring Jamie Kennedy (who also serves as a producer), Bobby Lee, Maria Menounos, Michael Rosenbaum and Vivica A. Fox, with a cameo appearance by Alan Ruck, reprising his role from Ferris Bueller's Day Off as Dr. Cameron Frye.

The plot follows a young breakdancer who hits his head during a talent show in 1986 and slips into a coma. Waking in 2006, he looks to revive his team, with the help of his girlfriend and his parents. It was released on April 27, 2007, to critical and commercial failure, grossing a fifth of its budget.

== Plot ==
In 1986, twelve-year-old Justin "Rocketshoe" Schumacher and his breakdancing group, The Funky Fresh Boyz (Darnell "Prince Def Rock" Jackson, Aki "Chilly Chill" Terasaki, and Hector "Popcorn" Jimenez), are ready for the annual talent show. The somewhat shy Justin has a crush on Jennifer, and gives her a Garbage Pail Kid card in exchange for her Smurfette figurine. His rival, obnoxious rich kid Kip Unger, shows up and gives her an expensive necklace. Justin and the Funky Fresh Boyz start the show, with his parents, Marty and Sylvia cheering for him. In an effort to impress Jen and win the contest, Justin uses a dangerous and untested headspin maneuver, which results in him flipping off the stage and falling into a coma.

Twenty years later, Justin is still comatose. Dr. Cameron Frye tells Marty and Sylvia that at this point, there is little sign that Justin will recover, and they decide to pull the plug. As his parents say goodbye and leave, however, a janitor rolls by with a radio playing the same song from the 1986 talent competition, "Rockit" by Herbie Hancock. It jars Justin's brain to function, waking him. As a result, Justin now finds himself suddenly 31 years old, going on 32. In addition, his parents were bankrupt from overdue life support payments. Jen, who has become a girls' dance instructor, is engaged to Kip. Kip is now an obnoxious promoter, and is set to host a breakdance contest broadcast on national television, with a grand prize of $100,000. Justin realizes that the money could help him repay his parents for what they've spent on his medical bills. Kip is sarcastic and still despises Justin, and schemes to keep him off the show and away from Jen.

Justin has difficulty adjusting to both his deteriorated physical condition and the severe culture shock after 20 years, and is nearly arrested as a child predator. He is rescued from mall security by his old friend, and Funky Fresh Boy, Darnell. Darnell is now a toy store employee and failed inventor, who is frequently slapped around by his wife. He explains much of what has changed in the past 20 years to Justin, before re-introducing him to the rest of the crew. Aki is an accountant, and has lost his old stereotypical Asian accent thanks to English classes. In addition, Aki is also trying to woo a colleague, Yun, who claims he might have a 2% chance of sleeping with her if he were a professional breakdancer. Hector is now an overweight meter maid. Despite their reluctance to return to the '80s lifestyle, they agree to try to retrain their faded breakdancing skills to help Justin.

Initially, the four are terrible, but their skills improve greatly with Justin's help, as Aki studies a RoboSapien toy to reclaim his mastery of the robot. Justin and Jen begin reminiscing about the old days. He eventually asks her on a date, which she thinks is just still a harmless crush. However, with the help of the Internet and practicing on Hector wearing a bra, Justin learns how to please a woman quite well. A surprise appearance by David Hasselhoff allows the pair to go on a date in KITT from Knight Rider. However, just as Justin has her shirt off and is making his move, Kip calls, leading Jen to be reminded that she is still engaged to him and runs off embarrassed.

During a rather sour birthday party celebration, Justin is confronted by the diminutive but talented Cole of the Iced Cole Crew, a group hired by Kip to ensure that the Funky Fresh Boyz lose. Cole challenges Justin to a dance-off in the parking lot. After Cole's impressive routine, along with some various flashbacks from his years in the coma, a nervous and depressed Justin vomits on Cole and runs off. He becomes too disillusioned to compete on the show. The rest of the Boyz decide to have a breakdancing homeless man stand in. Kip gloats to Jen about his psychological victory over Justin, which spurs her to finally break up with him. As the dance tournament progresses, the Funky Fresh Boyz and the Iced Cole Crew each progress in their individual brackets toward the finals. Jen finds Justin sulking in a local bar, and convinces him that she wants to be with him and to come back to compete in the show.

Justin convinces his worried parents that he will be all right, reciting the lyrics to the theme song from Diff'rent Strokes as an inspirational speech. Although Kip tries to prevent him from dancing, Jen stirs the crowd and Cole into letting him dance, and the FFB get the win when Justin is able to successfully complete the headspin maneuver from '86. An outraged Kip has a tantrum, which leads him to be fired from the network. He is then knocked out by a man from earlier in the film for using the slur "retarded", and is urinated on by the homeless dancer. The Funky Fresh Boyz win the prize money, and Justin and Jen wed and save his parents' house.

In an epilogue, Jen tries to teach Justin how to use an iPod, though he is having trouble finding where to put the cassette tape in. Darnell has invented the 98¢ store, but his wife continues to abuse him. Hector finds work as a Jennifer Lopez impersonator in Las Vegas, and Aki marries Yun in a lavish Jewish ceremony, which has increased his chances of sleeping with her to 3%. Kip never recovered fully from being punched, and is a judge on Dancing with the Stars.

== Cast ==
- Jamie Kennedy as Justin Allen "Rocketshoe" Schumacher
  - Alexander Calvert as Young Justin
- Maria Menounos as Jennifer
  - Alexia Fast as Young Jennifer
- Miguel A. Núñez Jr. as Darnell "Prince Def Rock" Jackson
  - J.R. Messado as Young Darnell
- Michael Rosenbaum as Kip Unger
  - Taylor Beaumont as Young Kip
- Christopher McDonald as Marty Schumacher
- Debra Jo Rupp as Sylvia Schumacher
- Bobby Lee as Aki "Chilly Chill" Terasaki
  - Hanson Ng as Young Aki
- Aris Alvarado as Hector "Popcorn" Jimenez
  - Anthony Grant as Young Hector
- Alan Ruck as Dr. Cameron Frye, the character he portrayed in Ferris Bueller's Day Off
- Jesse "Casper" Brown as Cole
- David Hasselhoff as himself/Michael Knight (cameo appearance)
- Vivica A. Fox as Roxanna Jackson, Darnell's Wife
- Emmanuel Lewis as himself (cameo appearance)
- Kira Clavell as Yun
- Regan Oey as Kid in Toy Store
- Burkely Duffield as George Michael Kid
- Frank C. Turner as Crazy Homeless Man, aka Carl

== Reception ==
=== Box office ===
The film grossed $2.49 million at its opening weekend and went on to gross a total of $4.7 million as opposed to its $25.7 million budget, making it a box-office bomb.

=== Critical response ===
Kickin' It Old Skool was panned by critics. It currently has a 2% score on Rotten Tomatoes, based on 43 reviews, with an average rating of 2.6/10. The site's critic consensus reads: "Kickin' It Old Skool is one big unfunny pop culture reference that doesn't feature many laughs." On Metacritic, the film has a score of 18 out of 100 based on 14 reviews, indicating "overwhelming dislike."
