= Possession (2009 film) =

- Promotional poster
- Directed by: Joel Bergvall; Simon Sandquist
- Written by: Michael Petroni
- Based on: Addicted by: Byun Won-mi; Song Min-ho; Gwak Jae-yong
- Produced by: Doug Davison; Guy East; Roy Lee; Nigel Sinclair; Bob Yari
- Starring: Sarah Michelle Gellar; Lee Pace; Tuva Novotny; Michael Landes; Chelah Horsdal
- Cinematography: Gregory Middleton
- Edited by: Robb Sullivan
- Music by: Andreas Alfredsson Grube; Cristian Sandoquist
- Production company: Vertigo Entertainment
- Distributed by: Yari Film Group
- Release dates: June 16, 2009 (Portugal); March 9, 2010 (United States)
- Running time: 90 minutes
- Country: United States
- Language: English
- Box office: $682,173

Possession is a 2009 American psychological thriller film starring Sarah Michelle Gellar and Lee Pace. It is a remake of the 2002 South Korean film Addicted.

== Plot ==
Jess is a sweet-natured but driven lawyer who puts her career ahead of her personal life and marriage to her artist husband, Ryan. The couple is on the verge of their first wedding anniversary and, though they are happy, the thorn in the side of their relationship is Ryan's younger brother Roman. Where Ryan comes across as an honest and sweet man, Roman is the direct opposite. Roman is moody and violent, particularly with his casual girlfriend Casey, and Jess is terrified of him, particularly as she met Ryan through Roman when she represented him in court on an aggravated assault charge. When Roman overhears Jess and Ryan discussing their plans to send him to a halfway house, he packs his bags and leaves in his car.

Jess calls Ryan, worried about what the impulsive Roman will do, and Ryan quickly heads home in his car. As the brothers cross the Golden Gate Bridge, they crash into one another and are both seriously injured. Jess goes to the hospital and learns that both Roman and Ryan are in comas. Casey arrives and shares a few words with Jess, who promises to keep her updated. Later, Jess gets her mail and finds one of Ryan's weekly handwritten love letters. After several weeks, Roman suddenly awakens—but he immediately claims to be Ryan, begging Jess to believe that he is her husband returned to her in his brother's body. He implies that something supernatural happened when their bodies were revived side by side on the road, but cannot explain the phenomenon. Jess is initially doubtful and hostile towards Roman, believing that he is disoriented from his head injuries, and she employs Casey's help in trying to get him to regain his memories.

However, he maintains that he is Ryan, continually offering romantic gestures and recounting specific memories private to them. Eventually, after a year passes, once he accurately recalls the story behind a certain photograph of the two of them, she believes that he is truly her husband and they resume their romantic life. Despite the disapproval of Jess' co-workers and a harsh reaction from Casey, who still believes that he is actually Roman, Jess and Ryan fall back into their former happy marriage, although Jess is still hesitant to turn off the machines keeping Ryan's body alive. They are both soon thrilled by the news that Jess is pregnant. Casey goes missing, but when the police question them, Ryan merely says that she was "troubled". Jess notices a discrepancy in a necklace that Ryan gave her before his accident, but brushes it aside until she discovers the original necklace hidden in a picture frame.

She then discovers that the box in which she kept all of Ryan's many love letters and photographs has been broken into, and she realizes that Roman has in fact lied to her, having previously studied the pictures and letters to learn the details of their marriage to impersonate his brother. When she confronts him, he quickly grows violent with her, saying that he did it because he loved her and knew they were meant to be together, saying that she must have sensed that it was him all along, and it is revealed that he murdered Casey because of her suspicions. As Roman and Jess fight, Ryan, in the hospital, experiences a seizure. Ryan holds Roman back through a mental link that they got from the crash. Jess finally manages to stab Roman with a pottery knife, and he dies as the doctors work on Ryan. Later, at the hospital, Jess learns that her baby sustained no injuries from Roman's attack and that Ryan managed to pull through his episode, and she sits by his bedside, promising to wait for him and start their life over once he returns to her. As she leaves the hospital, a man behind her helps her tie her necklace back on. She turns around to find nobody there, and then she smiles, knowing it was Ryan.

=== Alternate Ending ===
In an alternate ending, Casey simply moves away rather than being killed by Roman. Jess still discovers that Roman is really pretending to be Ryan, but when she prepares to confront him about it, she realizes that he is sincerely trying to be Ryan and she decides to look the other way and pretends not to know the truth. The real Ryan is eventually cremated while Jess allows Roman to continue pretending to be Ryan while continuing her relationship with him. This ending is more true to the original Addicted movie's ending.

== Cast ==
- Sarah Michelle Gellar as Jess
- Lee Pace as Roman
- Michael Landes as Ryan
- Chelah Horsdal as Miranda
- William B. Davis as Hypnotist
- Tuva Novotny as Casey
- Veena Sood as Dr. Katz

== Production ==
Yari Film Group financed and produced the film, in association with Vertigo Entertainment and Spitfire. Set in San Francisco, Possession was filmed in Vancouver, British Columbia, starting in October 2006. The casting of Lee Pace was announced the same month. Completed in 2007, the film was originally known as Addicted, but producers confirmed later that year that the film would be released as Possession.

== Release ==
The film had a range of release dates in the United States, between 2008 and 2009, due to financial problems at Yari, which lost their funding and filed for Chapter 11 bankruptcy. This, in conjunction with a nationwide financial collapse, caused the release to be delayed numerous times. The film was ultimately released straight to DVD and Blu-ray in the U.S. on March 9, 2010.

The film was released theatrically in a number of territories throughout South America, Europe, and Asia between 2009 and 2011.
