= It's Not Your Fault =

Single by New Found Glory

from the album Coming Home
- Released: July 25, 2006
- Recorded: 2006
- Genre: Alternative rock
- Length: 3:37
- Label: Geffen
- Songwriter: New Found Glory
- Producers: Thom Panunzio, New Found Glory

New Found Glory singles chronology
"I Don't Wanna Know" (2005)	"It's Not Your Fault" (2006)	"Kiss Me" (2007)

"It's Not Your Fault" is a song by American rock band New Found Glory, serving as the lead single from their fifth studio album Coming Home (2006). The track was first announced in July 2006, before the music video debuted on TRL on 1 August. "It's Not Your Fault" was released to radio on July 25, 2006. The song was later released to Modern Rock Radio in September, shortly before the album was released.

The single marked a musical departure for the band and was seen by critics as a step away from their usual pop punk sound, with the addition of prominent piano instrumentation.

== Composition ==
"It's Not Your Fault" is a rock song at a length of three minutes and thirty seven seconds, written by the five members of New Found Glory, all of whom share credits for the music composition and the lyrics. The song is composed in the A Major key and has a "moderate tempo" of 129 beats per minute. The band's primary composer and guitarist Chad Gilbert, notes that the song has "big, full guitars and a piano line that goes throughout. It's pretty anthemic, and Jordan's voice has never sounded better." Gilbert further explained that, "This one shows how we've changed. We're a band who have done different styles of songs every record. There's some really metal riffs on Catalyst that aren't on Coming Home, and then this had some pianos. We're music fans, so we want every record to sound different".

Lyrically, the song is about dealing with time apart in a relationship. The band's lead vocalist Jordan Pundik has noted, "I want people to think it's about whatever they want, but for me, it's about when you're in love with someone and you're away from them and you have an argument or a fight and it's over the phone, so you can't console them."

== Critical reception ==
As with Coming Home, "It's Not Your Fault" was warmly received by music critics. In a review for The Palm Beach Post it was noted that, "Coming Home is similar, in spirit, to the 1990s crooning of Chicago's brilliant Smoking Popes. Jordan Pundik's vocal delivery curls into sweetness, rather than a snarl. Wrapped around journal-entry cute lines on the earnestly protective pleadings of "It's Not Your Fault." Rae Alexandra of Kerrang! magazine, was of the opinion that "It's Not Your Fault" displays "more maturity - and piano - than ever before. It's not fast, it's not forced, but - in an entirely new way - it sours." Jack Foley of Indie London was also favorable of the track and noted "the chiming piano chords that open "It’s Not Your Fault" give way into an effortlessly inspiring song about young love that unfolds into a majestic chorus."

== Music video ==
Jordan Pundik (centre) performs onstage during the music video

The music video for the single was shot by long term music video director Brett Simon (Sugarcult, Queens of the Stone Age, The Killers). The video depicts the band performing the song live on several occasions (see screenshot), in between a story being revealed in reverse chronological order. The story portrays a man and woman (played by Teddy Van Deusen and Heide Lindgren from the American reality show 8th & Ocean), who wake up in bed naked together, and proceed to retrace their steps and retain their several items of clothing along the way. At the climax of the video, they end up where they first met in a record store and go their separate ways.

The concept itself was inspired by a German mobile phone commercial. The video idea came from the Axe/Lynx 24-7 spot, "Because you never know when (Getting Dressed)", that won "Gold Lion Cannes 2004" award. Chad Gilbert told Kerrang! magazine that, "It starts backwards, with a guy and a girl in bed naked, and then they put on their clothes, finding them strewn as they walk, until they get to their first meeting at the end. We just took the idea and went with it." The shoot was completed in one afternoon.

== Track listing ==
All songs written, composed and performed by New Found Glory.

US Promo
No.	Title	Length
1.	"It's Not Your Fault"	3:37

== Personnel ==
Single

- Jordan Pundik — lead vocals, lyrics
- Chad Gilbert — lead guitar, composer, lyrics
- Steve Klein — rhythm guitar, lyrics
- Ian Grushka — bass guitar
- Cyrus Bolooki — drums, percussion
- Benmont Tench — piano
- Thom Panunzio - producer
- Paul Miner — engineering
- Tom Lord-Alge — mixing
- Ted Jensen — mastering
- Autumn de Wilde — photography

Video

- Jordan Pundik — himself, band member
- Chad Gilbert — himself, band member
- Steve Klein — himself, band member
- Ian Grushka — himself, band member
- Cyrus Bolooki — himself, band member
- Teddy Van Deusen — boy
- Heide Lindgren — girl
- Brett Simon — director

== Release history ==
Release dates and formats for "It's Not Your Fault"
Region	Date	Format	Label(s)	Ref.
United States	September 12, 2006	Mainstream airplay	Suretone; Geffen	
