= Bob Yari =

Iranian-born American film producer (born 1961)

- Born: May 30, 1961 (age 65); Tehran, Iran
- Citizenship: American
- Education: University of California, Santa Barbara
- Occupations: Film producer and director
- Years active: 1989–present

Bob Yari (Persian: باب یاری; born May 30, 1961) is an Iranian-born American film producer and director.

== Biography ==
Yari was born to a Jewish family in Tehran, Iran. He grew up in New York City, and studied film in Santa Barbara. Yari has produced numerous award winning films, including Crash and The Illusionist. His directorial credits include Mind Games and Papa: Hemingway in Cuba. Yari has also produced numerous televisions series, including Yellowstone, 1883, and Mayor of Kingstown.

Yari began his film career in the 1980s working for film and television producer Edgar Scherick. In 1989, he directed and produced his first film, Mind Games. Yari left the film industry in the 1990s and spent the next decade developing large scale commercial real estate projects, including Greenspoint Mall in Houston, Texas. In the early 2000s, Yari returned to film and began developing, financing and producing films under four labels, including Laws of Attraction (Stratus Film), Employee of the Month (Bull's Eye Entertainment), A Love Song for Bobby Long (El Camino Pictures), and Crash (Bob Yari Prods). Over the next decade, Yari is credited with producing over forty features, including The Painted Veil, Street Kings, Prime and the Agent Cody Banks series. He also produced the feature documentaries Tyson, Dave Chappelle's Block Party and Can't Stand Losing You: Surviving the Police.

In 2016, Yari directed the biopic Papa: Hemingway in Cuba, which won the jury prize for Best World Feature at the Sonoma International Film Festival. The film was the first U.S. production in over five decades to be shot on location in Havana.

Yari first began producing for television in 2008 with the series Crash, a spinoff of the Oscar-winning film. Yari later partnered with 101 Studios to produce the Paramount Western series Yellowstone, and its prequel 1883, as well as Mayor of Kingstown. In 2022, Paramount announced that Yari would executive produce an additional slate of series, including: 1923, another chapter in the Yellowstone franchise starring Helen Mirren and Harrison Ford, Land Man, starring Billy Bob Thornton, Lioness starring Zoe Saldaña, Tulsa King, and the limited series Bass Reeves, starring David Oyelowo.

In 2021, Yari published his first book, The Human Condition: A Pathway to Peace and Fulfillment, exploring a pathway to happiness rooted in a balanced lifestyle and attitude. The following year, Yari published On Creation and the Origins of Life: An Exploration of Intelligent Design, an exploration of the various possibilities and theories on the start of life on our planet.

== Film credits ==
He was a producer in all films unless otherwise noted.

=== Film ===
| Year | Film | Credit |
|---|---|---|
| 1989 | Mind Games | Executive Producer |
| 1998 | Gohar-e shab cheragh | Executive producer |
| 2000 | Perfect Fit | |
| 2003 | Agent Cody Banks | Executive producer |
| 2003 | Where the Red Fern Grows | |
| 2003 | Devil's Pond | Executive producer |
| 2004 | Employee of the Month | |
| 2004 | In Enemy Hands | Executive producer |
| 2004 | Agent Cody Banks 2: Destination London | |
| 2004 | Laws of Attraction | Executive producer |
| 2004 | House of D | |
| 2004 | A Love Song for Bobby Long | |
| 2004 | Crash | |
| 2004 | Haven | |
| 2004 | Around the Bend | Executive producer |
| 2005 | Thumbsucker | Executive producer |
| 2005 | The Chumscrubber | Executive producer |
| 2005 | The Matador | Executive producer |
| 2005 | Hostage | |
| 2005 | The L.A. Riot Spectacular | Executive producer |
| 2005 | Sueño | Executive producer |
| 2005 | Winter Passing | Executive producer |
| 2005 | Prime | Executive producer |
| 2006 | The Illusionist | |
| 2006 | Find Me Guilty | Executive producer |
| 2006 | Even Money | Executive producer |
| 2006 | First Snow | |
| 2006 | The Hoax | |
| 2006 | Gray Matters | |
| 2006 | The Painted Veil | |
| 2006 | Factory Girl | Executive producer |
| 2007 | Resurrecting the Champ | |
| 2007 | Kickin' It Old Skool | |
| 2007 | Christmas in Wonderland | Executive producer |
| 2008 | Assassination of a High School President | |
| 2008 | The Accidental Husband | |
| 2008 | Street Kings | Executive producer |
| 2008 | Nothing but the Truth | |
| 2008 | What Doesn't Kill You | |
| 2009 | The Maiden Heist | |
| 2009 | Possession | |
| 2014 | The Barber | Executive producer |
| 2015 | Papa: Hemingway in Cuba | |
| 2017 | The Current War | Executive producer |
| 2019 | Above Suspicion | Executive producer |
| 2020 | The War with Grandpa | Executive producer |
| 2023 | Finestkind | Executive producer |
| 2023 | Strange Darling | Executive producer |
| 2025 | Bride Hard | Executive Producer |
| 2027 | Twilight of the Dead † | Producer |
| TBA | Fireflies at El Mozote | Executive producer |

=== As director ===
| Year | Film |
|---|---|
| 1989 | Mind Games |
| 2015 | Papa: Hemingway in Cuba |

=== Television ===
| Year | Title | Credit |
|---|---|---|
| 2008−09 | Crash | Executive producer |
| 2019 | The Last Cowboy | Executive producer |
| 2019−2024 | Yellowstone | Executive producer |
| 2021 | Under the Influence | Executive producer |
| 2021−present | Mayor of Kingstown | Executive producer |
| 2021−22 | 1883 | Executive producer |
| 2022−23 | George & Tammy | Executive producer |
| 2022−present | Tulsa King | Executive producer |
| 2023−25 | 1923 | Executive producer |
| 2023 | Waco: The Aftermath | Executive producer |
| 2023 | Lawmen: Bass Reeves | Executive producer |
| 2023−present | Special Ops: Lioness | Executive producer |
| 2024 | Landman | Executive producer |
| 2025 | MobLand | Executive producer |
| TBA | 6666 | Executive producer |
| TBA | The Murder of JonBenét Ramsey | Executive producer |
