= The Accidental Husband =

2008 American rom-com film

- Theatrical release poster
- Directed by: Griffin Dunne
- Written by: Mimi Hare; Clare Naylor; Bonnie Sikowitz
- Produced by: Jennifer Todd; Suzanne Todd; Jason Blum; Uma Thurman; Bob Yari
- Starring: Uma Thurman; Jeffrey Dean Morgan; Colin Firth; Isabella Rossellini; Sam Shepard
- Cinematography: William Rexer II
- Edited by: Suzy Elmiger
- Music by: Andrea Guerra
- Production companies: Blumhouse Productions; Team Todd
- Distributed by: Yari Film Group
- Release dates: February 29, 2008 (United Kingdom); November 10, 2009 (United States)
- Running time: 90 minutes
- Country: United States
- Language: English
- Box office: $22.7 million

The Accidental Husband is a 2008 American romantic comedy film directed by Griffin Dunne and starring Uma Thurman, Jeffrey Dean Morgan, Colin Firth, Isabella Rossellini, and Sam Shepard. The film was written by Mimi Hare, Clare Naylor and Bonnie Sikowitz, and was produced by Jennifer Todd, Jason Blum, and Uma Thurman.

The story follows a New York City fireman Patrick Sullivan who initially seeks revenge against the popular dating expert Dr. Emma Lloyd for her role in ending his engagement with his fiancée, but they inadvertently discover an unexpected, mutual attraction.

The film was theatrically released in the United Kingdom in 2008, but was released direct-to-DVD in the United States.

== Plot ==
Patrick Sullivan is looking forward to a life with Sophia, until she calls into the radio show hosted by famed love expert Dr. Emma Lloyd. Emma questions Sophia's concept of romantic love and advises her to break off their engagement, which she swiftly does.

Patrick, upset after hearing that Emma is about to be married herself, allows his young neighbor Ajay to hack into public records and create a fake marriage certificate between himself and Emma. Upon going to the public records office to get a marriage license, Emma and her perfect-gentleman fiancé, Richard, are told she is already married.

Emma sets out to find Patrick and give him annulment papers to sign so she can marry Richard. She finds him in a bar, and their initial meeting ends with her getting blind drunk.

The following day, Patrick comes to Emma's workplace to give her the annulment papers as she is leaving for a wedding cake tasting. He accompanies her to the tasting, where Frau Greta Bollenbecker assumes he is Emma's fiancé, Richard. Greta later comes to Emma's book launch because her husband Herr Karl Bollenbecker is planning to liquidate Richard's publishing house. Greta meets Emma during the banquet and tells her about it.

Patrick brings the annulment papers to the book launch. Matters get more complicated when Richard sees Greta and Karl with Emma and Patrick, who Emma asks to pose as Richard. He goes along with it when he learns that Greta believes Patrick will charm Karl so much that he will decide to continue in business with "Richard".

Patrick invites them all to Ajay's upanayana ceremony. Emma and the other guests have a good time there, where she sees a whole new side of Patrick, who had been repulsive to her until then. There is a slight spark of attraction, but Emma flees the scene before anything can happen.

Patrick decides to throw out everything related to Emma or Sophia, but instead reads Emma's book, Real Love. He comes to the radio station to confront her about the book because he thinks it only points out all the bad things in a relationship. Patrick and Emma continue their argument in an elevator. Suddenly Patrick flashes his FDNY badge, asking the other occupants to leave the elevator. He then locks the elevator to kiss Emma. Security staff see them through CCTV in the elevator and ask them to leave.

Emma finally has the signed and notarized annulment papers, but she considers calling off her wedding. She goes to Patrick's lodgings and they have sex that night. The following morning, Emma finds all the papers related to her and Sophia in the trash. Patrick then confesses that he had initially wanted to teach her a lesson about love but then fell for her. Emma then goes back to the honorable Richard, who still loves her, saying that she still wants to marry him.

One day before her wedding, Patrick calls her at the radio station and tells her that he loves her. She does not answer him. The next day, which is her wedding day, she confides in her father Wilder, and asks for his advice. He tells her that the decision is hers. Richard comes to see Emma in the bridal chamber. He had also heard the radio show the night before and tells her that he wants her to be happy, so they amicably break up.

Emma sets off the church's fire sprinklers, hoping to get Patrick to the church. Meanwhile, his fire department is called to the church to put out the fire. When Patrick arrives, Emma and he get married and leave in the fire truck. The final scene shifts to a year later where it is shown that Emma is pregnant and she and Patrick are still very much in love.

== Cast ==
- Uma Thurman as Emma
- Colin Firth as Richard
- Jeffrey Dean Morgan as Patrick
- Sam Shepard as Wilder
- Isabella Rossellini as Mrs. Bollenbecker
- Brooke Adams as Carolyn
- Keir Dullea as Mr. Bollenbecker
- Justina Machado as Sofia
- Lindsay Sloane as Marcy
- Ajay Naidu as Deep
- Sarita Choudhury as Sunny
- Jeffrey Tedmori as Ajay
- Nick Sandow as Larry
- Michael Mosley as Declan

== Soundtrack ==
The film features several of A. R. Rahman's songs including "Rang De", "Yaro Yarodi" and "Swasamae" (from the Hindi film Thakshak and the Tamil films Alai Payuthey and Thenali respectively) as well as Panjabi Hit Squad's "Kuriyeh".

== Release ==
Theatrically, the film was released on February 29, 2008, in the UK and was scheduled to be released on August 22, 2008, in the United States. It was delayed to March 27, 2009, before being shelved indefinitely following the bankruptcy of its distributor, Yari Film Group's releasing division. It was released direct-to-DVD in the United States on November 10, 2009.

== Reception ==
=== Box office ===
Not released theatrically in the United States and Canada, The Accidental Husband grossed $22.7 million at the box office in other territories.

=== Critical response ===
The film was generally panned by critics. On the review aggregator website Rotten Tomatoes, 11% of 18 critics' reviews are positive, with an average rating of 3/10. Metacritic, which uses a weighted average, assigned the film a score of 14 out of 100, based on 4 critics, indicating "overwhelming dislike".

Writing in The Guardian, critic Peter Bradshaw reported that "Thurman doesn't do anything as dramatically intelligible as 'play' anything. She grins, mugs and capers like a whippet on crack," that "there's an awful hint of the non-chemistry of its actors in the poster," and "100% of me wants it [capital punishment] for 100% of people involved in this romcom." Critic Anthony Quinn wrote in The Independent that "Even taking into account the dismal pedigree of director Griffin Dunne [...] and writer Bonnie Sikowitz, one could hardly have predicted this shocker" with "a plot of insufferable silliness," and noted that "none of it [is] helped by Thurman's thoroughly phony performance." In their review of the film for the BBC, Stella Papamichael described the film as a "hopelessly convoluted comedy," that "Morgan (supposedly the hero) gives us few reasons to care about his lonely existence [with] all the personality of chopped liver," that "Thurman resorts to falling over and repeatedly bumping her head to get a laugh," and "with such a half-hearted script and Griffin Dunne's casual direction, these attempts to inject screwball energy end up feeling more like desperate cries for help." Jenny McCartney of The Telegraph was critical of the lack of chemistry. "None of it works: the inexplicable alchemy between co-stars that can seduce the audience even in an indifferent rom-com doesn't arise between Thurman and Morgan."
