= Josh Pais =

American actor (born 1964)

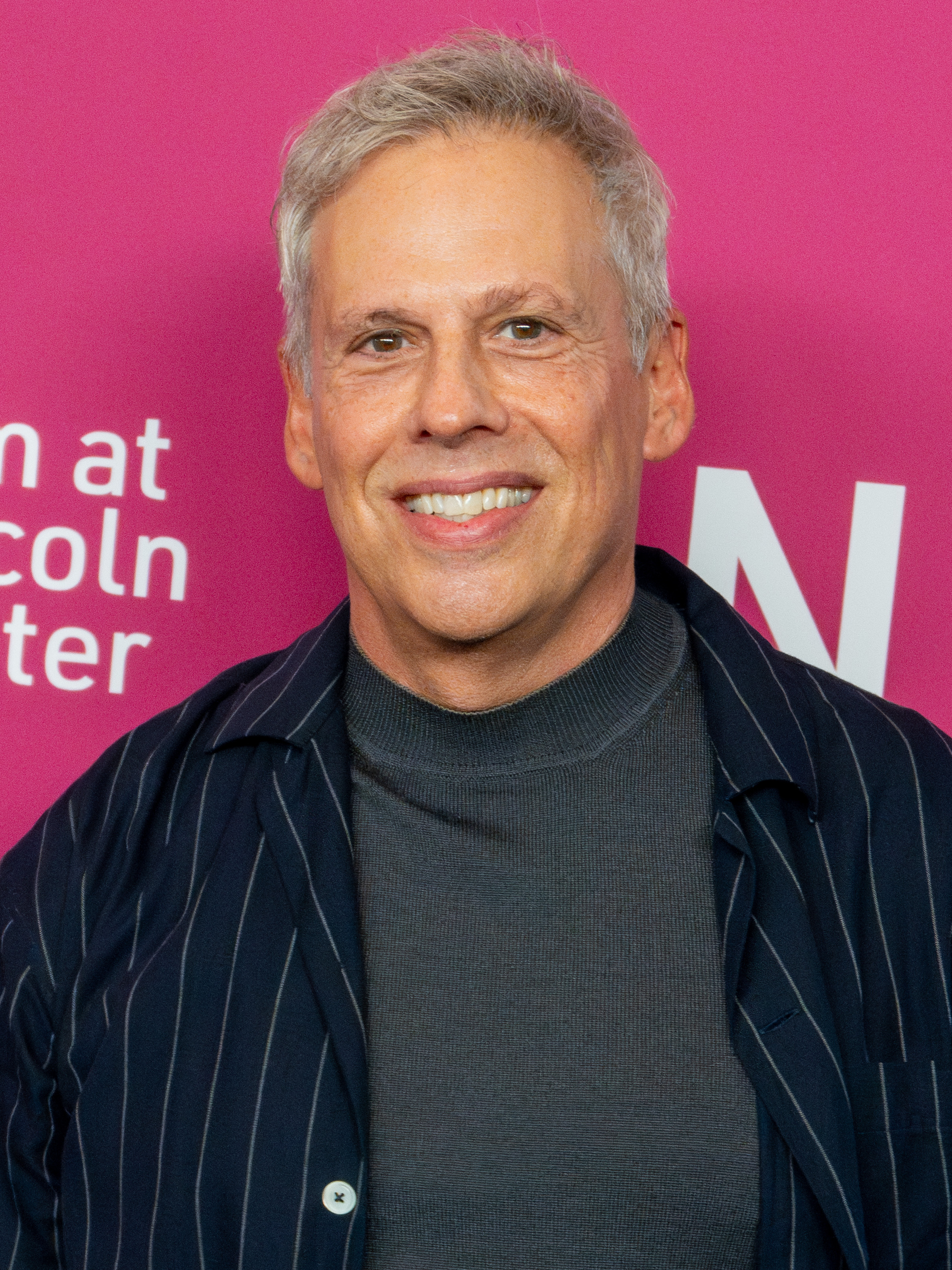
- Pais in 2024
- Born: Joshua Atwill Pais; June 21, 1958 (age 68); New York City, U.S.
- Occupations: Actor; Acting coach
- Years active: 1988–present
- Spouses: Lisa Emery (m. 1990; div. 2003) Marie Forleo (m. 2006)
- Children: 1
- Parent(s): Abraham Pais; Lila Lee Atwill

Joshua Atwill Pais (born June 21, 1958) is an American actor and acting coach. He has appeared in the films Teenage Mutant Ninja Turtles (1990), Music of the Heart (1999), Assassination of a High School President (2008), I Saw the Light (2015) and Motherless Brooklyn (2019). He also appeared in nine episodes of Ray Donovan.

He is also the director of the 2002 documentary 7th Street (the street he grew up on in Alphabet City, Manhattan) depicting various personages living there between the years 1992–2002.

== Early life ==
Pais was born in New York City, and is the son of Lila Lee (née Atwill), a painter and poet, and Dutch-born physicist, professor, and writer Abraham Pais. His father was from a Jewish family of Portuguese descent, and his mother converted to Judaism.

== Career ==
He has appeared in Hollywood films including Teenage Mutant Ninja Turtles (in which he was both in the costume and was the voice) as Raphael, Music of the Heart, Scream 3, It Runs in the Family, Phone Booth, Little Manhattan and Find Me Guilty. He played Assistant M.E. Borak in 15 episodes of the series Law & Order, between 1990 and 2002. He also played the Spanish teacher in the film Assassination of a High School President. He had a recurring role as obnoxious movie producer Stu Feldman on the American crime drama series Ray Donovan. He also appeared as a lawyer named Leo on 2 Broke Girls.

== Personal life ==
Pais married actress Lisa Emery on August 27, 1990. They are parents of the actor Zane Pais. Pais and Emery divorced in 2003. In 2006 he married entrepreneur Marie Forleo.

== Filmography ==
=== Film ===
Year	Title	Role	Notes
1989	Jacknife	Rick	
1990	How to Be Louise	Mike	
1990	Teenage Mutant Ninja Turtles	Raphael	
1996	I'm Not Rappaport	Rodney	
1997	Colin Fitz Lives!	Cathartic Fan	
1998	Safe Men	Mitchell	
1998	Rounders	Weitz	
1998	A Civil Action	Law Clerk	
1998	Karma Local	Charlie	
1999	Music of the Heart	Dennis	
2000	Scream 3	Wallace	
2000	Swimming	Neil Wheeler	
2001	Scotland, PA	Douglas McKenna	
2001	A Beautiful Mind	Princeton Professor	
2002	Phone Booth	Mario	
2003	The Station Agent	Carl	
2003	It Runs in the Family	Barney	
2005	Little Manhattan	Ronny	
2005	Confess	Allen Kelner	
2005	The Reality Trap	Tom	
2006	Unconscious	Warner Wilcott	
2007	Teeth	Dr. Godfrey	
2007	Year of the Dog	Robin	
2007	Watching the Detectives	Andy	
2007	Neal Cassady	Calbert Holt	
2008	Assassination of a High School President	Padre Newell	
2008	Synecdoche, New York	Ophthalmologist	
2008	Lifelines	Ira Bernstein	
2009	Adventureland	Mr. Lewin	
2009	Reunion	Saul	
2009	Leaves of Grass	Ken Feinman	
2009	Gentlemen Broncos	Todd Keefe	
2010	Please Give	Adam	
2011	The Key Man	Dr. Abraham Meyer	
2011	Detachment	Meredith's Father	
2012	Arbitrage	John Aimes	
2012	Price Check	Doug Cain	
2012	The Normals	Dr. Honeysack	
2013	Touchy Feely	Paul	
2013	Syrup	Davidson	
2014	That Awkward Moment	Fred	
2014	5 Flights Up	Jackson	
2015	I Saw the Light	Dore Schary	
2015	The Family Fang	Freeman	
2016	Bakery in Brooklyn	Alexander Johnson	
2017	Crown Heights	D.A. Mengano	
2017	Going in Style	Chuck Lofton	
2018	The Land of Steady Habits	Larry Eichner	
2019	Motherless Brooklyn	William Lieberman	
2019	Joker	Hoyt Vaughn	
2020	The Mimic	The Neurotic Lawyer	
2021	Checkout	Dov	
2022	Funny Pages	Lewis	
2022	Spoiler Alert	Scott	
2023	You Hurt My Feelings	Josh Pais	
2024	The Friend	Jerry	
2025	If I Had Legs I'd Kick You	Brad	

=== Television ===
Year	Title	Role	Notes
1988	The Cosby Show	Andy	Episode: "Waterworks"
1989	Murphy Brown	Secretary #18	Episode: "Funnies Girl"
1989	Teething with Anger	Dog Guy	Television film
1990–2009	Law & Order	Various roles	16 episodes
1993	Roseanne	Sean	Episode: "Be My Baby"
1994	The Second Greatest Story Ever Told	Joey Joesephson	Television film
1996	On Seventh Avenue	Donny	Television film
1997, 1998	Star Trek: Deep Space Nine	Gaila	2 episodes
1998	Homicide: Life on the Street	M.E. #2	Episode: "Shaggy Dog, City Goat"
1998	Sex and the City	Nick Waxler	Episode: "Models and Mortals"
1998	The Crow: Stairway to Heaven	Myron	Episode: "Death Wish"
2000	The Street	Elliot Bando	Episode: "Closet Case"
2000–2016	Law & Order: Special Victims Unit	Robert Sorensen Deputy Commissioner Hank Abraham	10 episodes
2001	The Job	Mark	Episode: "Anger"
2002	Porn 'n Chicken	Prof. Hoffman	Television film
2003, 2007	Law & Order: Criminal Intent	Noah Brezner Ralph Friedman	2 episodes
2004	Hope & Faith	Harvey Zak	Episode: "Hope Gets a Job"
2005	Rescue Me	Leon	Episode: "Reunion"
2006	The Sopranos	Zev Charney	Episode: "Mr. & Mrs. John Sacrimoni Request..."
2007	The Bronx Is Burning	Phil Pepe	3 episodes
2007	Damages	George Berber	Episode: "She Spat at Me"
2009	Michael & Michael Have Issues	Jim Biederman	7 episodes
2010	Outlaw	Doc Levin	2 episodes
2011	How to Make It in America	Garrett	Episode: "In or Out"
2012	2 Broke Girls	Leo	Episode: "And the Drug Money"
2012	NYC 22	Maxwell Tanner	Episode: "Jumpers"
2013	Psych	Dr. Richard Umma	Episode: "No Trout About It"
2013–2019	Ray Donovan	Stu Feldman	9 episodes
2014	The Good Wife	Howard Lampey	Episode: "We, the Juries"
2014	Alpha House	Owen Lefkowitz	Episode: "The Nuptials"
2014	Duty	Ira	Television film
2015	Sex & Drugs & Rock & Roll	Ira Feinbaum	8 episodes
2015–2021	Younger	Todd Heller	5 episodes
2018	High Maintenance	Ira	Episode: "Ghost"
2018	Maniac	Andy	3 episodes
2018	I Was A Teenage Pillow Queen	David	Television film
2019	Tales of the City	Doug	Episode: "Rainbow Warriors"
2019	Mrs. Fletcher	Barry	5 episodes
2020	The Plot Against America	Maurice Silverman	Episode: "Part 5"
2022	The Dropout	Wade Miquelon	2 episodes
2023	Paul T. Goldman	Ryan Sinclair	2 episodes
2024	Power Book III: Raising Kanan	Lowell Gelfand	Episode: "Home to Roost"
2024	A Man in Full	Herb Richman	5 episodes
