= Roy Lee =

American film producer

- Lee in 2026
- Born: Brooklyn, New York, U.S.
- Education: American University Washington College of Law, George Washington University
- Occupation: Film producer
- Years active: 2002–present

Roy Lee is an American film and television producer. He is the founder of production company Vertigo Entertainment and co-founded Spooky Pictures with Steven Schneider.

== Early life ==
Lee was born at Wyckoff Heights Hospital in Wyckoff Heights, Brooklyn, to Korean parents. His father, a doctor, and his mother, had been in the United States for just three years and were still acclimating. Lee's mother, a devout Christian, nurtured hopes that he would become a minister.

During his undergraduate studies at George Washington University, Lee interned at the law firm Fried, Frank, Harris, Shriver & Jacobson. After graduating GWU, Lee attended law school at American University Washington College of Law where he prepared for a career in corporate law.

== Career ==
In 1996, after graduating from law school at American University and working at Fried Frank for eight months, he moved to Los Angeles and worked as a "tracker" at a production company called Alphaville. Trackers monitor spec material and dealmaking. At the time, trackers shared information over the phone, constantly updating each other in an endless cycle of calls.

=== Online tracking ===
One of Lee's "tracker" friends, Polly Cohen Johnsen, had been updating the story department at Jersey Films and had the idea to put their tracking group online. Lee joined forces with Johnsen and Glenn Gregory of Propaganda Films to convert their daily phone calls into an online tracking group. In 1997, Lee set up an Internet bulletin board called Tracker for twenty of his friends, who rated scripts and posted pertinent tracker information for each.

Within six months, Lee had established twenty-five online groups for other trackers at production companies and studios in Hollywood. Since he was the only member who belonged to every group, he had the best information. Lee's project changed the spec script market forever. While spec scripts and pitches continued to sell, weaker material was dismissed more quickly, often within a single day, to the frustration of many agents. Online tracking accelerated the market, brought more honesty, allowed development execs to sift for material more effectively and put more pressure on agents and producers to represent better material.

In 1999, Lee went to work with BenderSpink, a talent-management company owned by two of his friends, Chris Bender and JC Spink. He was charged with finding Internet content: short films that would play on PCs. In the same year, Ed Kashiba, Sean Connolly, and Lee developed the company Scriptshark.com, an online platform for novice screenwriters to have their scripts assessed and potentially marketed. Scriptshark eventually sold to The New York Times and closed in 2016.

=== Vertigo Entertainment ===
Lee in 2017

In the fall of 2001, after setting up film projects at all the major studios, Lee left BenderSpink and joined Doug Davison to create Vertigo Entertainment. When working on a project together, Lee did the selling, and Davison handled the follow-up work. Lee noted that in the beginning, the hardest thing was making contacts abroad.

Lee's approach to making deals involved explaining to Asian distributors that their films would probably not sell in America because of their subtitles and that they would make more money by selling remake rights. Then he assured the rights holder that he would protect them by representing them for free (the American studio would pay his fee when the film was made). Once Lee had secured the right to negotiate for an Asian company, he told the studios to regard the film as a script that someone had taken the trouble to film, and that had been tested and proved a hit in its home country.

Lee earned his first motion picture producing credit on Gore Verbinski's 2002 blockbuster The Ring. He went on to produce the 2004 haunted house horror film The Grudge, which starred Sarah Michelle Gellar and was based on the 2002 Japanese film Ju-on: The Grudge, which was directed by Takashi Shimizu. The box office hit held the record for the biggest horror opening weekend following its October 2004 release.

The Grudge 2 was released in October 2006, starring Amber Tamblyn and Gellar, and directed by Shimizu. It topped the box office at $22 million on its opening weekend.

He worked as executive producer of the Uruguay short film Ataque de pánico! alongside Doug Davison.

== Filmography ==
Producer

- Dark Water (2005)
- The Lake House (2006)
- Assassination of a High School President (2008)
- Shutter (2008)
- The Strangers (2008)
- The Echo (2008)
- Quarantine (2008)
- The Uninvited (2009)
- Possession (2009)
- Quarantine 2: Terminal (2011)
- The Roommate (2011)
- Abduction (2011)
- Oldboy (2013)
- The Voices (2014)
- The Lego Movie (2014)
- Flight 7500 (2014)
- Run All Night (2015)
- Poltergeist (2015)
- Hidden (2015)
- The Boy (2016)
- Rise (2016)
- Blair Witch (2016)
- Sleepless (2017)
- The Lego Batman Movie (2017)
- Death Note (2017)
- It (2017)
- The Lego Ninjago Movie (2017)
- Polaroid (2019)
- The Lego Movie 2: The Second Part (2019)
- It Chapter Two (2019)
- The Turning (2020)
- His House (2020)
- Brahms: The Boy II (2020)
- Watcher (2022)
- Barbarian (2022)
- Don't Worry Darling (2022)
- Late Night with the Devil (2023)
- The Mother (2023)
- Nimona (2023)
- Cobweb (2023)
- Woman of the Hour (2023)
- Boy Kills World (2023)
- Strange Darling (2023)
- Ordinary Angels (2024)
- Desert Road (2024)
- 'Salem's Lot (2024)
- Companion (2025)
- A Minecraft Movie (2025)
- Until Dawn (2025)
- The Plague (2025)
- Weapons (2025)
- The Long Walk (2025)
- V/H/S/Halloween (2025)
- The Vile (2025)
- Psycho Killer (2026)
- Hokum (2026)
- Company (2026)
- The Liberation (2026)
- Resident Evil (2026)
- What Happened to Doris? (2026)
- V/H/S/Mixtape (2026)
- Anything but Ghosts (2027)
- Possession (2027)
- A Minecraft Movie Squared (2027)
- System (TBA)
- The Shepherd (TBA)

Executive producer

- The Ring (2002)
- The Grudge (2004)
- The Ring Two (2005)
- Eight Below (2006)
- The Departed (2006)
- The Grudge 2 (2006)
- I'm from Rolling Stone (2007)
- The Invasion (2007)
- The Eye (2008)
- My Sassy Girl (2008)
- The Grudge 3 (2009)
- Asylum Blackout (2011)
- The Woman in Black (2012)
- Bates Motel (2013–2017)
- The Woman in Black: Angel of Death (2014)
- The Exorcist (2016-2017)
- The Master: A Lego Ninjago Short (2016)
- Iris (2016)
- Rings (2017)
- The Disaster Artist (2017)
- Unikitty! (2017–2020)
- Extinction (2018)
- Godzilla: King of the Monsters (2019)
- Doctor Sleep (2019)
- The Grudge (2019)
- The Stand (2020-2021)
- Them (2021-2024)
- Godzilla vs. Kong (2021)
- Baghead (2023)
- Dead Mail (2024)
- Godzilla x Kong: The New Empire (2024)
- The Strangers: Chapter 1 (2024)
- V/H/S/Beyond (2024)
- Em & Selma Go Griffin Hunting (2025)
- How to Train Your Dragon (2025)
- Undertone (2025)
- The Strangers – Chapter 2 (2025)
- It: Welcome to Derry (2025–present)
- The Strangers – Chapter 3 (2026)
- River (2026)
- Crystal Lake (2026)
- Godzilla x Kong: Supernova (2027)
- Skeletons (2027)
- How to Train Your Dragon 2 (2027)
- God of War (TBA)
- Bishop (TBA)

Co-producer

- How to Train Your Dragon (2010)
- How to Train Your Dragon 2 (2014)
- How to Train Your Dragon: The Hidden World (2019)
