= Shortcut to Happiness =

2007 comedy film

- Theatrical release poster
- Directed by: Alec Baldwin (credited as "Harry Kirkpatrick")
- Written by: Pete Dexter; Bill Condon; Nancy Cassaro
- Based on: "The Devil and Daniel Webster" by Stephen Vincent Benét Scratch by Archibald Macleish
- Produced by: David Glasser; Carol Gillson; Jonathan Cornick; Alec Baldwin; Randall Emmett
- Starring: Alec Baldwin; Jennifer Love Hewitt; Anthony Hopkins; Dan Aykroyd; Kim Cattrall; Amy Poehler
- Cinematography: Adam Holender
- Edited by: John Carter; Mark Winitsky; Jeff Wood
- Music by: Christopher Young
- Production companies: Emmett/Furla Films; El Dorado Pictures; Miracle Entertainment
- Distributed by: Yari Film Group
- Release date: July 13, 2007 (U.S.)
- Running time: 105 minutes
- Country: United States
- Language: English
- Budget: $30 million
- Box office: $686,846

Shortcut to Happiness is a 2007 fantasy comedy film directed by Alec Baldwin, who stars alongside Jennifer Love Hewitt and Anthony Hopkins. The film is based on the Stephen Vincent Benét 1936 short story "The Devil and Daniel Webster." Shot in early 2001 in New York City, the film was plagued with financial difficulties and was shelved for several years. Yari Film Group eventually bought and released the film to theaters in 2007.

== Plot ==
Jabez Stone is a desperate, down-on-his-luck writer who hits rock bottom when his close friend, Julius Jensen, finds success. In his attempts to get his work published, he meets a beautiful stranger who offers him a chance at fame and fortune in exchange for his soul. Stone, having lost faith in himself, agrees to the offer.

After accepting the deal, Jabez is quickly lavished with all he had ever dreamed of: a book deal, money, women, notoriety, Stone now has it all. However, despite the success, he is losing the friendship, respect and trust of those around him. Coming to the realization that he did not quite get everything that he bargained for, Stone begs the devil to release him from their deal. When the devil scoffs, he turns to famed orator Daniel Webster. The two conclude that they should take the battle to court with Webster defending Stone in an otherworldly trial against the devil in the ultimate battle of wits in a fight over the fate of Stone's soul.

== Cast ==
- Anthony Hopkins as Daniel Webster
- Alec Baldwin as Bez Stone
- Jennifer Love Hewitt as The Devil
- Dan Aykroyd as Julius Jensen
- Kim Cattrall as Constance Hurry
- Barry Miller as Mike Weiss
- Amy Poehler as Molly Gilchrest
- Mike Doyle as Luke
- Bobby Cannavale as Cop
- Karen Ziemba as Mrs. Miller
- John Hills as Truman Capote

In addition, Gay Talese, George Plimpton and Carrot Top make cameo appearances as themselves.

== Production history ==
Shot in early 2001 in New York City, the film was plagued with financial difficulties. A remake of “The Devil and Daniel Webster," the film was meant to be Alec Baldwin's directorial debut. But due to ongoing issues with backers, financing collapsed and the F.B.I. became involved, which led to Shortcut to Happiness never being properly completed. Baldwin eventually removed his name as director and called for a boycott of the film leading up to its 2001 premiere, but was still credited as one of 17 producers.

Baldwin said the movie was taken from him during post-production, because "[s]ome of the film's investors are being investigated for bank fraud". After removing his name from the director credit, Baldwin's name was ultimately replaced with the pseudonym "Harry Kirkpatrick" in the film's opening credits. Bob Yari bought the film from a bankruptcy court for an undisclosed amount. Once the film was cleared to be sold for distribution, a rough cut was screened at film festivals in 2003 and 2004, though much of the film's post-production work was not finished. The film needed further financing to complete the editing and special effects, and to replace temporary music.

In July 2006 it was announced that Yari's company would work on finishing the film. In 2007 the Yari Film Group announced the acquisition of the film and distribution plans.

== Reception ==
=== Box office ===
Shortcut to Happiness was a box-office bomb, grossing $686,846 at the box office, against a budget of $30 million.

=== Critical response ===
Shortcut to Happiness received negative reviews from critics upon release. The film was criticized for its poor pacing, directing, and acting performances. Variety wrote that Baldwin, "like so many thesp-helmers, lacks an instinctive sense of how to place and move the camera."
