= Brett Simon =

American film director

- Born: November 28, 1973 (age 52); Palo Alto, California
- Occupations: Film director, commercial director, music video director
- Years active: 2001 - present
- Website: web.archive.org/brettsimon.com

Brett Simon (born November 28, 1973, in Palo Alto, California) is an American commercial, music video and film director.

== Career ==
Simon graduated from Princeton University summa cum laude in 1997 with a Bachelor of Arts degree in Comparative Literature and Creative Writing, and later graduated from the University of California, Berkeley in 2002 with a Master of Fine Arts degree in Art Practice. He is a PhD candidate in Film Studies at UC Berkeley. In 2001, he wrote, directed, edited and produced the short film Counterfeit Film, which showed at the Telluride Film Festival, South by Southwest and RESFest and has been archived at the Pacific Film Archive at UC Berkeley, as well as winning multiple awards. In 2005, he wrote, directed, edited and produced the short film The Sailor's Girl, which screened at the Sundance Film Festival and Toronto International Film Festival. After making a number of short films, he became an accomplished music video director, working on the videos for Marion Raven's "Break You" and "Here I Am", The Killers' "Somebody Told Me", Polar Bear's "Belly", The Joggers' "Hot Autism", Unwritten Law's "Save Me", Good Charlotte's "The Chronicles of Life and Death", New Found Glory's "It's Not Your Fault", Lostprophets' "A Town Called Hypocrisy", Sugarcult's "Do It Alone", Queens of the Stone Age's "Sick, Sick, Sick", Hoobastank's "The Reason", and Rise Against's "Audience of One".

In 2008, Simon directed his first feature film, the Catholic school noir Assassination of a High School President, from Tim Calpin and Kevin Jakubowski's script. Assassination of a High School President has premiered at the South by Southwest and Sundance Film Festivals.

Between 1998 and 2003, Simon taught film history, film theory and video production at UC Berkeley. He has also had journalism stints at the Kitchen Sink, Speak and Fabula magazines.

Simon worked with Rob Nilsson and David Herrera on the feature film Security at the Pacific Film Archive.

== Personal life ==
Simon graduated from Gunn High School in 1992. His mother is Joan Simon and his father is Jack Simon, a Los Altos, California, psychiatrist and street photographer. He currently lives in Venice, Los Angeles.
