= Marie Forleo =

American life coach

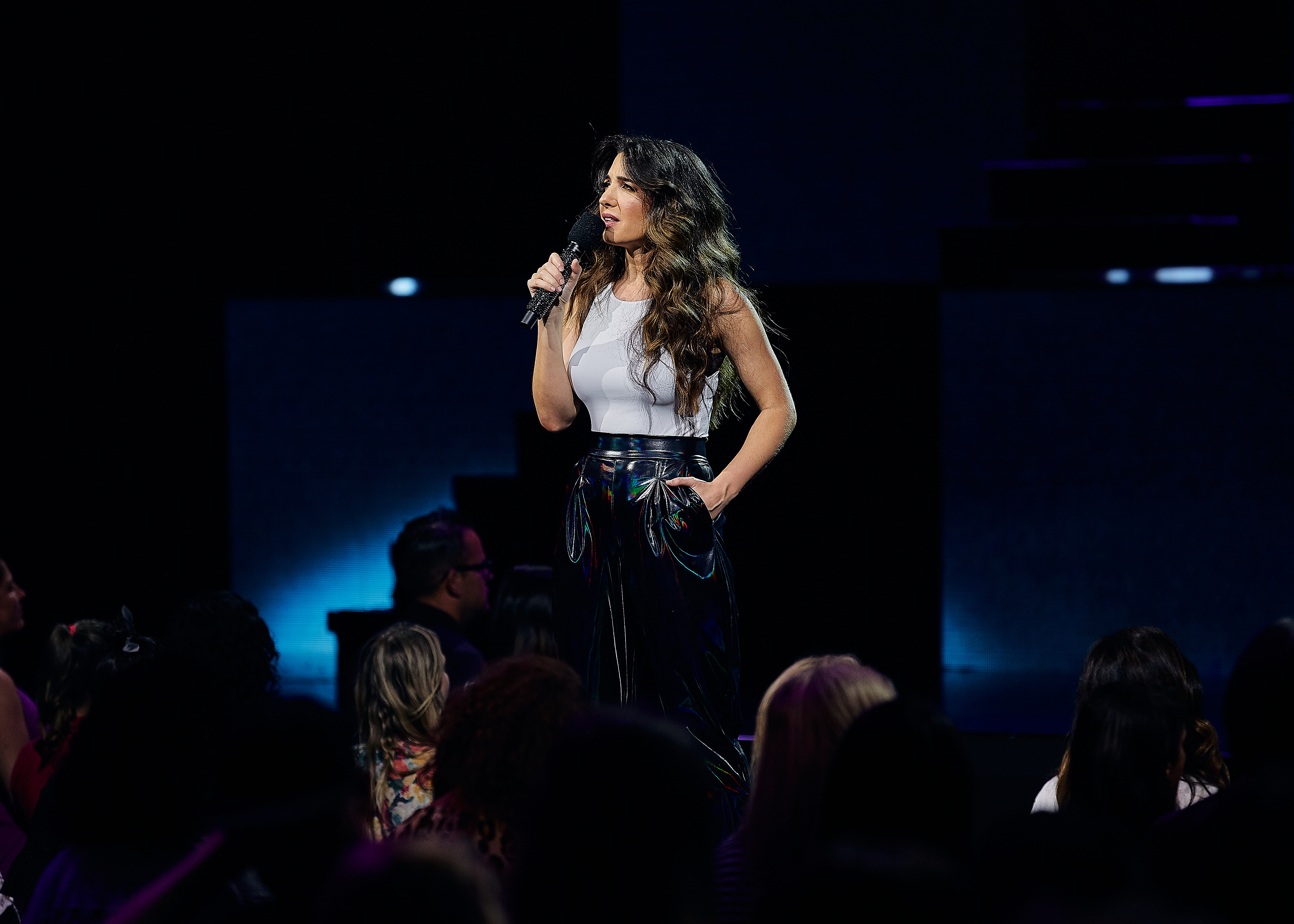
- Born: December 7, 1975 (age 50)
- Education: Seton Hall University
- Occupations: Life coach, motivational speaker, author, web television host
- Spouse: Josh Pais (m. 2006)
- Website: www.marieforleo.com

Marie Forleo (born December 7, 1975) is an American entrepreneur and founder of Marie Forleo International. She is known for her advice books Everything is Figureoutable and Make Every Man Want You, as well as the online business program B-School. Forleo hosts MarieTV, a YouTube web series, and The Marie Forleo Podcast.

== Personal life ==
Forleo was raised in New Jersey. She graduated as valedictorian from Seton Hall University with a degree in business finance in 1997.

She is married to actor Josh Pais.

== Career ==
After graduating from college, Forleo became a trading assistant on the floor of the New York Stock Exchange (NYSE). She left the NYSE to work for Gourmet and Mademoiselle. In 2001, she established an online newsletter and gained subscribers and coaching clients from relationships she formed while bartending and instructing fitness and dance classes.

In 2008, Forleo released Make Every Man Want You: How to Be So Irresistible You'll Barely Keep from Dating Yourself!. The following year, she founded Marie Forleo International, a business coaching practice. She also started a web television show called MarieTV. In May 2011, she launched the online business course "Rich, Happy & Hot B-School" with fellow entrepreneur Laura Roeder. Eventually, the program name was shortened to "B-School."

Forleo starred in the 5-part docuseries, Transcendence: Live Life Beyond the Ordinary, in 2018, and in the documentary, We Rise Up, in 2019. In September 2019, Forleo released Everything is Figureoutable: One Simple Belief to Create Unstoppable Success. The book was a #1 New York Times bestseller.

== Works ==
- Make Every Man Want You: How to Be So Irresistible You'll Barely Keep from Dating Yourself! (2008) ISBN 978-0071597814
- Everything is Figureoutable: One Simple Belief to Create Unstoppable Success (2019) ISBN 978-0525534990

== Filmography ==
- Crunch Cardio Dance Blast (2005)
- Prevention Fitness Systems - Dance Yourself Thin (2006)
- Women's Health- The Wedding Workout(2006)
- Dance Off: Tummy Tone Party (2006)
- Dream Girl (2016)
- Transcendence (2018)
- Today Show (2019)
- We Rise Up (2019)
