= Islands in the Stream (film) =

1977 film by Franklin J. Schaffner

- Theatrical release poster
- Directed by: Franklin J. Schaffner
- Screenplay by: Denne Bart Petitclerc
- Based on: The novel Islands in the Stream by Ernest Hemingway
- Produced by: Peter Bart; Max Palevsky
- Starring: George C. Scott; David Hemmings; Gilbert Roland; Claire Bloom
- Cinematography: Fred J. Koenekamp
- Edited by: Robert Swink
- Music by: Jerry Goldsmith
- Distributed by: Paramount Pictures
- Release date: March 9, 1977 (United States)
- Running time: 105 minutes
- Country: United States
- Language: English
- Box office: $8 million

Islands in the Stream is a 1977 American drama film, an adaptation of Ernest Hemingway's posthumously published 1970 novel of the same name. The film was directed by Franklin J. Schaffner and starred George C. Scott, Hart Bochner, Claire Bloom, Gilbert Roland, and David Hemmings. The film was nominated for an Academy Award for Best Cinematography, losing to Close Encounters of the Third Kind.

== Plot ==
Artist Thomas Hudson is an American who has left the civilized world for a simple life in the Caribbean. Schaffner tells the tale in four parts:

- The Island - Introduces Hudson and the people he knows. It is set in the British Bahamas, circa 1940. Tom is concerned about his friend Eddy, who loves to drink and brawl with anyone he finds. Later the residents of the island and Tom celebrate the Queen mother (1936–1952)'s anniversary.
- The Boys - Weeks after the celebrations for the Queen Mother, Tom is reunited with his three sons. It is a bittersweet reunion, because he left them and his wife Audrey four years before. Later they go on a challenging fishing trek to catch a Marlin. The segment ends as the boys return to the United States, where oldest son Tom joins the Royal Air Force in time for the Battle of Britain. Their father writes and tells them in a monologue how much he misses them.
- The Woman - Tom's wife Audrey is introduced. She turns up unexpectedly and Tom wonders if she wants to get back together. Tom has already told his oldest son that he has never loved anyone else. However, she reveals that she is getting married again, although she clearly still has feelings for Tom. Tom is puzzled about why she has returned and angry, then realises why - she is there to tell him that young Tom is dead. They comfort each other, then she leaves, as planned.
- The Journey - Tom attempts to help refugees escape the Nazis. He is accompanied by Joseph and Eddy. Leaving the British-owned Bahamas for the waters near neutral Cuba, Tom finds the refugees and tries to conduct them to the port of Havana, and ultimately to the U.S. He worries that he may not be able to trust Eddy, that the refugees may not survive the voyage, and this trip may be suicide for all concerned if they face the Cuban Coast Guard. While being chased by sailors, Eddy is shot and killed. Just short of their goal, a Cuban gunboat appears, but Tom saves his passengers by staging a diversion for the Cuban sailors, and the refugees reach dry land. Tom hopes to save his own ship by spilling fuel onto the water, which he then ignites. While Tom's crew survives, he is cut down by gunfire from the Cuban boat. As he hovers between life and death, Tom has a vision of his beloved house by the sea, now empty. There he is joined by Audrey and his sons. They embrace and then leave the house. Knowing that his life is about to end, Tom muses that he was very lucky to have the life he had.

== Cast ==
- George C. Scott as Thomas Hudson
- David Hemmings as Eddy
- Gilbert Roland as Captain Ralph
- Susan Tyrrell as Lil
- Richard Evans as Willy
- Claire Bloom as Audrey
- Julius Harris as Joseph
- Hart Bochner as Tom
- Brad Savage as Andrew
- Michael-James Wixted as David

== Reception ==
Film critic Roger Ebert, giving the film three stars, called the film one that "plays it well and good and honestly", noting the satisfactory performances in the cast and the photography while noting the weakness of the third act.
