= Denne Bart Petitclerc =

American journalist, television producer and screenwriter

- Born: May 15, 1929; Montesano, Washington, United States
- Died: February 3, 2006 (aged 76); Los Angeles, California, United States
- Occupations: Author; journalist; war correspondent; producer; screenwriter
- Spouse: Wanda Petitclerc (m. 1970–2006)

Denne Bart Petitclerc (May 15, 1929 – February 3, 2006) was an American journalist, war correspondent, author, television producer, and screenwriter.

== Biography ==
Born in Montesano, Washington, Petitclerc was five years old when his father, Edmund Petitclerc, reportedly took him to Seattle to see the angel atop the Bon Marché department store Christmas tree. His father told young Petitclerc to watch the angel and that he would be right back. He abandoned the family and never returned.

His mother, Grace Petitclerc (née Meyers), abandoned with two children, decided to place Petitclerc and his older sister, Frances, in an orphanage in San Jose in order to go to school. His mother would earn a doctorate and teach at UC Berkeley. She also wrote books about educating handicapped children.

=== Career ===
In 1950, Petitclerc became a Korean War correspondent for the Santa Rosa Press Democrat. He also worked for the San Francisco Chronicle and the Miami Herald.

In the 1950s while living and working in Florida, Petitclerc wrote a fan letter to writer Ernest Hemingway. He received a response from Hemingway and they became friends. On one of their fishing trips Hemingway alluded to a yet unfinished book he believed would make a great film. Later Petitclerc would adapt Hemingway's novel and wrote the screenplay for the film Islands in the Stream.

Le Mans book cover.

In the 1960s he wrote his first script for the television show Bonanza and soon was working on the long time series. He became the show's executive story editor. In 1969 he created for NBC Then Came Bronson, a one-hour drama television show about a motorcycle riding news reporter searching for the meaning of life. He also helped launch The High Chaparral (1967–1971) for NBC. He wrote the pilot and other episodes.

His book Le Mans 24 was a novelization of the film Le Mans starring Steve McQueen.

Speaking of Petitclerc in the Los Angeles Times Peter Bart, editor in chief of Variety said, "He was a master at translating, keeping the essence of Hemingway's attitudes and ideas but framing them into lines that an actor could speak on the screen."

Petitclerc wrote several movies for television and the screenplay for the 1972 feature film Red Sun with Charles Bronson and Toshirō Mifune. Other credits include the television movies Key West, Men of the Dragon, The Woman Who Sinned, The Vivero Letter and The Cowboy and The Ballerina.

In 1969, Petitclerc donated his collection of Hemingway's letters to Sonoma State University in Rohnert Park, California.

=== Later years and death ===
Petitclerc was led to Ketchum, Idaho, by Ernest Hemingway who'd moved there in the early 1960s. Petitclerc lived in Ketchum for the last thirty-five years of his life. He died on February 3, 2006, in Los Angeles while being treated for complications from lung cancer.

According to Variety, Petitclerc, at the time of his death, was working on Papa: Hemingway in Cuba, a film based on his relationship with Hemingway. When he died, the film was in development. It was released in 2015.

== Award nomination ==
- Islands in the Stream (1974). Nominated for a Writers Guild of America Award for his screenplay adaptation of Hemingway's novel.

== Books ==
- Rage of Honor. Doubleday: 1966.
- Le Mans 24. Harcourt Brace Jovanovich: 1971. ISBN 0-15-149820-2.
- Destinies. Simon and Schuster: 1981. (Co-author Peter Bart.) ISBN 0-671-24677-1.
