= First Snow (2006 film) =

2006 film by Mark Fergus

- Promotional poster
- Directed by: Mark Fergus
- Written by: Mark Fergus; Hawk Ostby
- Produced by: Bob Yari; Sean Furst; Tom Lassally
- Starring: Guy Pearce; Piper Perabo
- Cinematography: Eric Edwards
- Edited by: Jay Cassidy
- Music by: Cliff Martinez
- Distributed by: Freestyle Releasing
- Release dates: May 5, 2006 (Tribeca Film Festival); March 23, 2007 (United States)
- Running time: 101 minutes
- Language: English
- Box office: $573,864

First Snow is a 2006 thriller starring Guy Pearce and directed by Mark Fergus. The film was released on March 23, 2007.

== Plot ==
Slick salesman Jimmy Starks (Pearce) has auto problems in a small New Mexico town and while his car is in the shop he visits low-rent fortune teller Vacaro (J.K. Simmons) to pass the time. The supposed seer tells him he will have good fortune soon, but looking deeper relates the information that his future is blank, and he is safe only until the first snow of winter beyond which there is no future to foretell. The act upsets Jimmy and rekindles old transgressions and makes him feel he is on a collision course with destiny especially when an old friend Vincent (Shea Whigham) returns from a jail sentence that was longer because Jimmy "sold him out." Jimmy becomes obsessed with knowing more of his future and re-visits Vacaro but the old man can only tell the salesman that he has related to him all he can see. Jimmy feels that Vincent has returned to kill him and that he must do something to change the course of his future but Vacaro convinces him to accept his fate.

One theme referenced in the film (by the radio announcer) is the idea of the Sword of Damocles.

== Cast ==
- Guy Pearce as Jimmy Starks
- Piper Perabo as Dierdre
- J. K. Simmons as Vacaro
- William Fichtner as Ed
- Rick Gonzalez as Andy Lopez
- Shea Whigham as Vincent
- Jackie Burroughs as Maggie
- Adam Scott as Tom Morelane
- Portia Dawson as Tavern Waitress Marci
- Luce Rains as Roy Harrison
- Dave Mallow (voice, uncredited) as Radio Announcer

== Critical reception ==
As of July 2022, the film holds a 58% approval rating on aggregator website Rotten Tomatoes, based on 74 reviews with an average rating of 5.9/10. The website's critics consensus reads: "In First Snow, an interesting premise gives way to a slow and tedious noir that adds little to the genre."

== Home media ==
First Snow was released on Blu-ray in Italy on 6 July 2010, France 1 April 2011 and in the United States 16 June 2020.
