= Script market =

A script market is the system in which a screenwriter and producer engage in the buying and selling of a script for the film and television industries. The process of selling a script may begin with the pitch, however since the end of the 1980s the ability to pitch a film to producers has greatly depended on the notoriety of the screenwriter. One reason attributed to this effect is that studios are looking for the next big hit, but scared to take a chance on a script that doesn’t meet a pre-established formula guaranteed to make money since no one knows what will work. The majority of scripts are read by studio interns and others, who give the scripts a “consider”, “pass”, or “recommend” status, with most scripts receiving a “pass” rating. However, an agent who's signed the Artists-Managers Agreement drawn up by the Writers Guild of America can submit scripts to producers directly. Agents try to create buzz in the script market using spec script. With everyone in the entertainment industry trying to pursue the million-dollar dream, and Hollywood so desperate for new material ideas, the script market functions and business practices have been pursued in the spec script manner.

Studio executives, producers, and agents don't have time to read every script, so readers or script analysts prepare script coverage for them. Spec scripts are written in hopes of being purchased by a producer or studio. A spec script can be passed around by an agent, which can create a bidding war. The spec script process is considered by some to be problematic, because the bidding process can attract inflated prices from the boosting of mediocre scripts.
