= Papa: Hemingway in Cuba =

- Theatrical release poster
- Directed by: Bob Yari
- Written by: Denne Bart Petitclerc
- Produced by: Amanda Harvey; Weezie Melancon; Michael Pacino; Bob Yari
- Starring: Giovanni Ribisi; Joely Richardson; Adrian Sparks; Minka Kelly
- Cinematography: Ernesto Melara
- Edited by: Glen Scantlebury
- Music by: Mark Isham
- Distributed by: Yari Film Group
- Release dates: November 19, 2015 (Key West Film Festival); April 29, 2016 (United States)
- Running time: 109 minutes
- Countries: Canada; United States
- Language: English
- Budget: £100,000 (US$123,000)
- Box office: $4.6 million

Papa: Hemingway in Cuba is a 2015 biographical film. It was written by Denne Bart Petitclerc, and directed by Bob Yari. The film is based on events from Ernest Hemingway's life in Havana, Cuba in the 1950s, and on a friendship that developed there between Hemingway and Petitclerc, who was then a young journalist. The film received generally unfavorable reviews.

== Plot ==
In 1959, young journalist Ed Myers (a character representing Petitclerc) is working for a Miami newspaper. He wants to be a writer and had long admired Ernest Hemingway, then living in Cuba. Myers writes to Hemingway and is surprised when he answers, inviting the journalist to Cuba to go fishing with him. While the Cuban Revolution comes to a boil around them, Hemingway advises Myers on his writing. Myers continues to write articles for his newspaper, reporting on the Revolution.

An early scene from the film depicts rebels allied with Fidel Castro bursting into a street near Havana's Government Palace to confront soldiers loyal to the government of Fulgencio Batista. Hemingway and Myers take cover, with Hemingway guiding Myers through the war zone. They gradually develop a friendship and Myers spends an increasing amount of time with Hemingway and his fourth wife Mary.

== Cast ==
- Giovanni Ribisi as Ed Myers
- Joely Richardson as Mary Welsh Hemingway
- Adrian Sparks as Ernest Hemingway
- Minka Kelly as Debbie Hunt
- James Remar as Santo Trafficante
- Shaun Toub as Evan Shipman
- Mariel Hemingway as Female guest
- Anthony Molinari as John Fletcher
- Daniel Travis as Bob Luther
- Frank Licari as Sal
- Rodrigo Obregón as Lucas

== Production ==
Petitclerc had written the screenplay and had begun working on production of the film at the time of his death in 2006.

Production on location in Cuba concluded in May 2014. It was the first Hollywood film to be filmed in Cuba since the 1959 revolution, according to The Hollywood Reporter. The filmmakers received permission to film inside Finca Vigía, Hemingway's residence from 1939 to 1960. The government later adapted it as a national museum. Hemingway wrote For Whom the Bell Tolls and The Old Man and the Sea at Finca Vigía.

The film's title, Papa, was Hemingway's nickname. He was called "Papa" by his colleagues and admirers, as well as his family.

== Reception ==
Papa: Hemingway in Cuba received generally negative reviews from critics. On Rotten Tomatoes, the film has an approval rating of 11% based on reviews from 45 critics. The site's consensus quoted Hemingway's The Old Man and the Sea (1952) in concluding, "A man can be destroyed but not defeated, although the desultory Papa: Hemingway in Cuba makes one feel as if both can be accomplished by watching a single film." On Metacritic it had a score of 37 out of 100, based on reviews from 17 critics, indicating "generally unfavorable reviews".

Joe Leydon of Variety wrote that the film "never transcends the tropes of a formulaic biopic that views its famous subject through the eyes of a worshipful young devotee." Miriam Di Nunzio of the Chicago Sun-Times gave it 2.5 out of 4 and called it "A film that is beautiful to look at but lacks clear vision." Peter Travers of Rolling Stone gave it 2 out 4 and gave the film a mixed review: "Papa gives us sights to revel in. Oddly, what hurts is the clunky, overripe script." Helen Verongos of The New York Times wrote: "Ms. Richardson comforts and coaxes and exasperatedly, bitingly demeans, but she and Mr. Sparks play past each other instead of engaging."

== See also ==
- Ernest Hemingway
- Cuban Revolution
