= A Monument to the Death of an Idea =

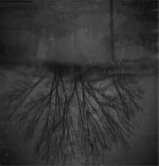

EP by Enochian Theory
- Released: August 2006
- Recorded: June 2006
- Studios: The Old Blacksmiths Studios, Portsmouth
- Genre: Progressive rock
- Length: 33:12
- Label: Anomalousz Music
- Producers: Rich Tamblyn and Enochian Theory

Enochian Theory chronology
Our Lengthening Shadows (2005)	A Monument to the Death of an Idea (2006)	Evolution: Creatio Ex Nihilio (2009)

Professional ratings
Review scores
Source	Rating
Powerplay	.
Classic Rock	.
Zero Tolerance Magazine	.
Big Cheese	.
Rock Hard	.
Eurobands.us	link
Rockmidgets.com	link
Roomthirteen.com	link
Sputnikmusic	link
The-Mag.me.uk	link
Iwillbeheard.co.uk	link
Ox-fanzine.de	link

A Monument to the Death of an Idea is an EP by the band Enochian Theory.

== History ==
In June 2006, Enochian Theory entered The Old Blacksmiths Studios in Portsmouth, with Emmy nominated producer and engineer Rich Tamblyn and began to record the tracks for their second record, entitled A Monument to the Death of an Idea.

The band had written several new songs since the release of the Our Lengthening Shadows EP and had chosen to completely rework two of the songs from that EP for inclusion on the new recording.

After lengthy rehearsals and last minute musical changes, the EP's five tracks were recorded, mixed and co-produced by the band in four days.

The artwork for the CD was finalised in August, with the concept and realisation entirely created by the band themselves.

Initially available only through the band's website and shows, the band would form their own record label to support the release and signed with CODE 7 and Plastic Head Distribution to ensure worldwide distribution for the CD.

Following the press coverage the CD was well-received by music publications. Rock and metal magazine Powerplay, dubbed it "excellent stuff" and "a little bit of musical magic". Classic Rock Magazine were equally impressed saying "If you like your prog full of planet splitting drama...Enochian Theory are the band for you".

In April 2007 the band signed a distribution deal with Plastic Head Media Distribution for the download single release of "Namyamka". This was released to rock and internet radio stations and was accompanied by a professionally shot promotional video for the song, which was made available for request on rock channels Kerrang! TV, Scuzz and Rockworld TV.

Reviews of the single were in the same vein as the EP's reviews, with comments such as "Enochian Theory perform soaring, atmospheric, progressive, modern rock of the quality that seems to have been missing from the UK scene for many years" from Rock3Music.com and "Enochian Theory are about to explode and there's nothing we can do about it" from Black Velvet.

The combination of the two releases lead to the band's first successful U.K tour, which was booked for them by SaN PR.

== Track listing ==
All tracks are written by Enochian Theory.

No.	Title	Length
1.	"A Countermeasure In Hindsight"	8:41
2.	"For Those With Conscience"	5:35
3.	"Traversing The Edge Of Dawn"	7:12
4.	"Our Lengthening Shadows"	6:36
5.	"Namyamka"	5:08
Total length:		33:12

== Personnel ==
- Ben Harris Hayes – Vocals and Keyboards
- Shaun Rayment – Bass guitar
- Sam Street – Drums and percussion
- Scott Ware – Guitar
