= Resurrection (New Found Glory album) =

Studio album by New Found Glory
- Released: October 7, 2014
- Recorded: June–July 2014, Los Angeles, California
- Genres: Pop-punk; alternative rock
- Length: 42:41
- Label: Hopeless
- Producer: New Found Glory

New Found Glory chronology
Kill It Live (2013)	Resurrection (2014)	Makes Me Sick (2017)

Singles from Resurrection
- 1. "Selfless" Released: August 5, 2014; 2. "Ready & Willing" Released: September 9, 2014; 3. "Stubborn" Released: December 19, 2014; 4. "One More Round" Released: April 8, 2015; 5. "Vicious Love" Released: July 22, 2015

Resurrection is the eighth studio album by American rock band New Found Glory. Released on October 7, 2014, it is the band's first album recorded as a four-piece since the departure of founding guitarist-lyricist Steve Klein in late 2013. The album also marks their debut release with independent label Hopeless Records, having concluded their previous recording contract with Epitaph Records.

Produced alongside frequent collaborator Paul Miner and recorded between June and July 2014, the album was preceded by singles "Selfless" and "Ready & Willing." To promote the release of the album, the band headlined the fifth annual Glamour Kills tour starting on August 10, with dates across South Korea, Canada, the United States, and Europe.

== Background ==
In October 2011, the band released their seventh studio album Radiosurgery via Epitaph Records. To support the album, the band headlined the Rockstar-sponsored "Pop Punk's Not Dead Tour" in North America ahead of Set Your Goals, The Wonder Years, Man Overboard, and This Time Next Year. The tour commenced on 6 October in Santa Cruz, California and ran through to 20 November in San Diego. Following a report published in Billboard magazine announcing the band would be entering a "lengthy hiatus", Chad Gilbert spoke out and strongly denied these rumors before confirming they would be recording their first live album the following year. The band went on to release Kill It Live in October 2013, which featured the band's live set recorded over two nights at Chain Reaction in California, as well as three new studio tracks including single "Connect the Dots."

The release was followed up with a co-headline tour alongside Alkaline Trio with support from H_{2}O in October and November. Following the completion of the aforementioned tour, the band made a shock announcement via their Facebook page on December 12, informing fans that founding member and rhythm guitarist Steve Klein had parted ways with the band. The statement explained that Klein was no longer in the band due to "personal differences" and that they would begin searching for a replacement soon, having made plans to record albums without him. On May 16, 2014, vocalist Jordan Pundik announced the group would be recording their next album in June. Two days later, the group revealed that the album would be released on independent label Hopeless Records in the fall.

== Writing and recording ==
Drummer Cyrus Bolooki recounted the writing process of the album in an interview with Blunt magazine: "This time around was cool as there was a lot of collaboration going on, there were no roadblocks. There really wasn’t that much stress; it was fun writing this record. I live a short drive from Chad’s [Gilbert, guitar] house so I’d head there and he’d record guitars and structures, I’d add in drum parts and send it around to everyone where the lyric ideas were coming through. It wasn’t just Chad either, Jordan [Pundik, vocals] contributed a lot of vocal ideas. The three of us in California [bass player Ian Grushka resides in Florida] would go to Chad’s and sit around the dining room table while Jordan recorded demos on this crappy microphone. We did that over a dozen times; we’d actually written the record before we set foot in the studio."

== Release ==
On August 5, 2014, a music video was released for "Selfless". Later that day, Resurrection was announced for release in October, revealing its track listing. On the same day, the group released a behind-the-scenes video from the studio. Four more videos of this nature were posted on August 30, September 12, October 1 and October 9. In late August, the group performed at Fashion Meets Music Festival, followed by an appearance at Riot Fest. On September 9, a music video was released for "Ready & Willing". On September 25, "Stories of a Different Kind" was premiered via Alternative Press. The following day, "Stubborn" was made available for streaming. Resurrection was released on October 7. The band embarked on a headlining US tour, titled Glamour Kills Tour, with support from We Are the In Crowd, Fireworks, Candy Hearts, Red City Radio and Better Off. In November, the group went on a headlining UK tour, dubbed Pop Punk's Not Dead. They were supported by the Story So Far, Candy Hearts, State Champs and Only Rivals.

In February and March 2015, the band performed at Soundwave festival in Australia. On March 11, a music video was released for "One More Round". In March and April, the group went on the Sleep When I Die! Tour in the US with support from Turnstile, This Wild Life and Turnover. On April 8, the group released a 7" vinyl with "One More Round", and an acoustic version of "Living Hell" as its B-side. On July 22, a music video was released for a new version of "Vicious Love", which featured Hayley Williams of Paramore. On October 9, a reissue of the album called Resurrection: Ascension was released. On the same day, a music video was released for the new version of "Ready & Willing", which included cameos from Mark Hoppus of Blink-182, Ryan Key of Yellowcard, and Chris Carrabba of Dashboard Confessional, among others. In October and November, the group went on a co-headlining US tour with Yellowcard. They were supported by Tigers Jaw. In March 2016, the group performed at So What?! festival.

== Reception ==
=== Critical response ===
Professional ratings
Review scores
Source	Rating
AbsolutePunk	4/10
Allmusic	4/5 stars
Alternative Press	3.5/5 stars
Big Cheese	7/10
Exclaim!	8/10
Kerrang!	4/5 stars
Rock Sound	7/10
Rolling Stone Australia	3.5/4 stars
The Daily Sundial	favorable

Resurrection received generally favourable reviews from music critics, with a Metacritic rating of 73/100 based on six reviews. Kerrang! commented, "Resurrection is a powerhouse of a record, the brave onward steps of New Found Glory proving that hope--like pop-punk--is not dead". Exclaim! felt that "The band have once again found their sweet spot". Thomas Nassiff of AbsolutePunk.net said, in a polarizing review of the album, that "The worst part about this album is that it feels like New Found Glory writing a New Found Glory record for the sake of writing a New Found Glory record. At no point do I get any sort of impression of passion during the album's runtime." The album was included at number 20 on Rock Sound's "Top 50 Albums of the Year" list. The album was included at number 44 on Kerrang!'s "The Top 50 Rock Albums Of 2014" list.

=== Commercial performance ===
The album debuted at number 25 on the Billboard 200 with first week sales of 14,000 copies in the United States, narrowly outselling fellow rock band Yellowcard (who released Lift a Sail on the same day) by less than 100 copies.

== Track listing ==
All songs written and composed by New Found Glory.

1. "Selfless" – 3:47
2. "Resurrection" – 3:01
  featuring Scott Vogel of Terror
3. "The Worst Person" – 3:30
4. "Ready & Willing" – 3:22
5. "One More Round" – 3:03
6. "Vicious Love" – 3:23
7. "Persistent" – 3:06
8. "Stories of a Different Kind" – 3:06
9. "Degenerate" – 3:24
10. "Angel" – 3:44
11. "Stubborn" – 3:30
  featuring Anthony Raneri of Bayside
12. "Living Hell" – 2:41
13. "On My Own" – 3:04
  featuring Brendan Yates of Turnstile
Resurrection: Ascension
1. "Selfless"
2. "Resurrection"
3. "The Worst Person"
4. "The Enemy"
5. "Ready & Willing II"
  featuring Mark Hoppus, Mike Herrera, Ryan Key, Chris Demakes, Chris Carrabba, Chris Conley, Matt Pryor, Brianna Collins, Garrett Dale, and David Wood
6. "The Crown"
7. "One More Round"
8. "Vicious Love"
  featuring Hayley Williams of Paramore
9. "Persistent"
10. "Stories of a Different Kind"
11. "Degenerate"
12. "Angel"
13. "Stubborn"
14. "Living Hell"
15. "On My Own"
16. "Ready & Willing (acoustic)"
17. "Persistent (acoustic)"
18. "Living Hell (acoustic)"
19. "Vicious Love"
20. "Ready & Willing"

== Personnel ==
Personnel adapted from Resurrection liner notes.

New Found Glory

- Jordan Pundik – vocals
- Chad Gilbert – guitars, backing and gang vocals
- Ian Grushka – bass guitar, backing and gang vocals
- Cyrus Bolooki – drums, percussion, backing and gang vocals

Additional performers

- Scott Vogel – guest vocals on "Resurrection"
- Anthony Raneri – guest vocals on "Stubborn"
- Brendan Yates – guest vocals on "On My Own"
- Carah Faye – backing vocals
- Audelia Flores – gang vocals
- Michael Torres – gang vocals
- Chris Titone – gang vocals
- Mod Sun – gang vocals
- Josh Cruz – gang vocals
- Moises Cruz – gang vocals

Production

- New Found Glory – production
- Paul Miner – recording, engineering
- Kyle Black – mixing (all except "Angel", "Ready & Willing", "Stories of a Different Kind")
- Devon Corey – mix engineering assistance (all except "Angel", "Ready & Willing", "Stories of a Different Kind")
- Ken Andrews – mixing on "Angel" and "Ready & Willing"
- Stephen Egerton – mixing on "Stories of a Different Kind"
- Alan Douches – mastering

== Charts ==
Chart (2014)	Peak position
Australian Albums Chart (ARIA)	33
Japanese Top Album Sales (Billboard Japan)	55
UK Albums Chart (OCC)	74
UK Rock Albums (OCC)	7
UK Independent Albums (OCC)	18
US Billboard 200	25
US Independent Albums (Billboard)	5
US Hard Rock Albums (Billboard)	2
US Alternative Albums (Billboard)	3
US Rock Albums (Billboard)	6
