= Enochian Theory =

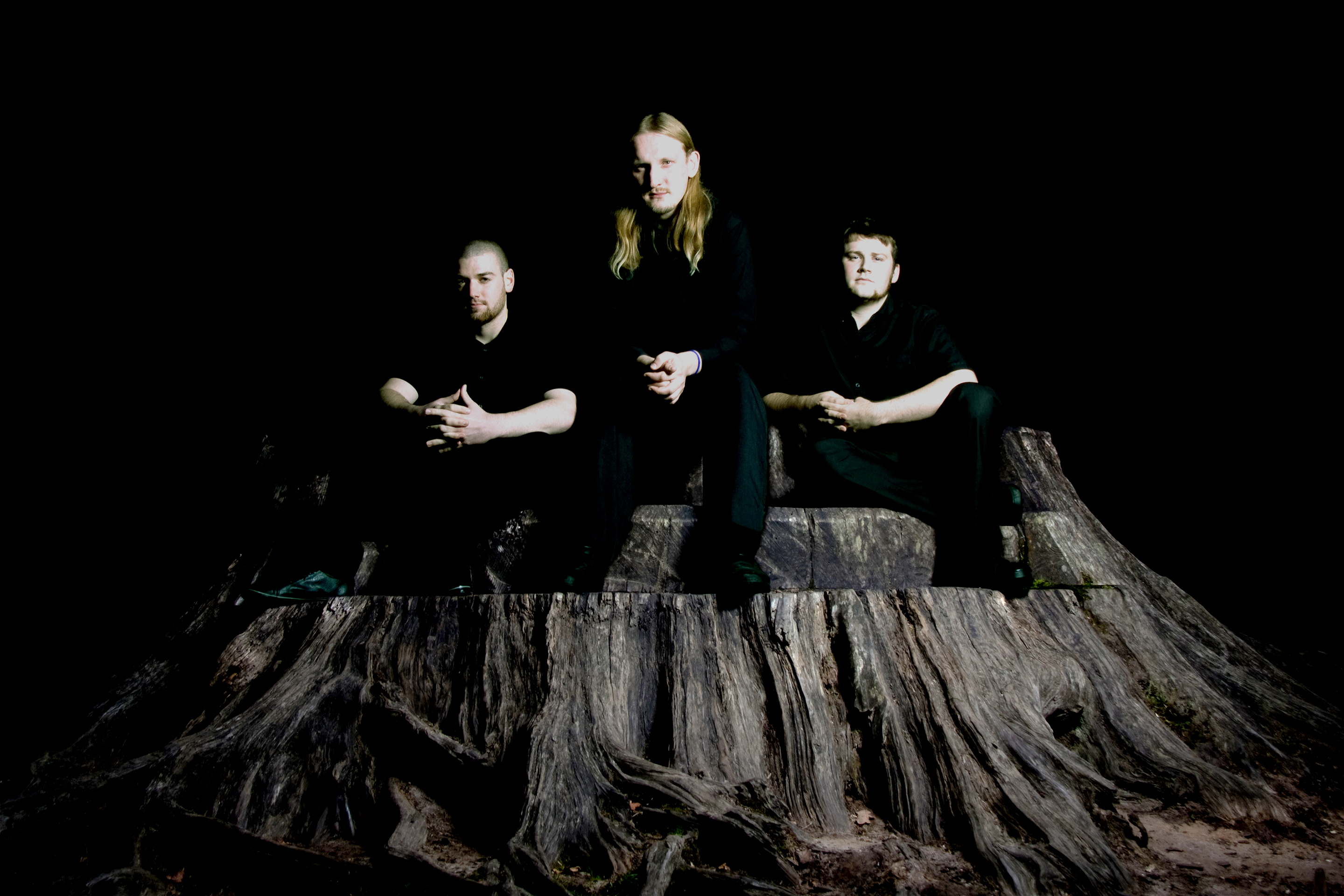

Background information
- Origin: Portsmouth, Hampshire, England
- Genres: Rock; heavy metal; progressive rock
- Years active: 2004–2018
- Labels: Anomalousz Music Records Ltd.; Mascot Records
- Website: Enochiantheory.co.uk

Enochian Theory is an English rock/heavy metal/progressive rock band, formed in 2004 in Portsmouth, Hampshire, England. The original lineup of the band consisted of drummer Sam Street, bass guitarist Shaun Rayment, guitarist Scott Ware, and singer/guitarist/keyboard player Ben Harris Hayes.

== Enochian Theory ==
=== Formation ===
The band members met through their individual involvements in the south coast of England local music scene Drummer Sam Street, bass guitarist Shaun Rayment and guitarist Scott Ware came together to start jamming after meeting in school.

In September 2004, Ben Harris-Hayes came to audition for the band after being handed an advert/flyer for the band by his sister and impressed them with his vocals and songwriting ability. He became a permanent member shortly after and with the line-up complete, Enochian Theory were formed. The band began to write and demo music, completing their first recording in March 2005.

=== Our Lengthening Shadows ===
Their first recording was Our Lengthening Shadows, a seven track CD, which was sold at shows and via the band's website. It was well received by the local music press who saw great promise in the band and their songs. The innovative rock/metal EP opened new doors for the band and allowed them to secure shows around the UK. The EP would eventually sell out. Over the course of supporting its release, the band's sound continued to evolve and led them back into the studio for their next recording.

=== A Monument to the Death of an Idea ===
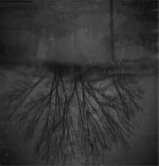
A Monument to the Death of an Idea album cover

The band entered The Old Blacksmiths studios in Portsmouth, during June 2006 with Emmy nominated producer and engineer Rich Tamblyn in order to record the five new tracks that would make up their second record. It was entitled A Monument to the Death of an Idea and would showcase the progressive, hard rock and atmospheric style they had developed over the course of the past two years.

The EP was ready for release by August that year.

With the 2005 Our Lengthening Shadows EP now discontinued and the self-financed A Monument to the Death of an Idea, initially only available only through the band, Enochian Theory managed to secure support shows with several established bands including Twin Zero, Red Sparrowes and Ephel Duath.

In order to promote the release on a wider scale, the band used their musical knowledge and contacts they had made since their formation and formed a partnership called Anomalousz Music Records Ltd. (based on Ben's old tape trading/promo company name)

By setting up their own record label, A Monument to the Death of an Idea would become available worldwide. The band signed with CODE 7/Plastic Head Distribution to handle this, allowing the CD to become available through all major music outlets such as Play.com, Amazon.com, and HMV.

With the CD now available worldwide, press coverage followed with such music publications as Metal Hammer, Classic Rock Magazine, Zero Tolerance Magazine, Power Play Big Cheese, Black Velvet, Play Music, the Greek version of Rock Hard and Spanish rock and metal magazine This Is Rock all featuring articles about the band and reviews of the EP

The band chose to release "Namyamka" to rock and internet radio stations making it available as a downloadable single and shot a video to accompany it which was made available for request on rock channels Kerrang! TV, Scuzz and Rockworld TV.

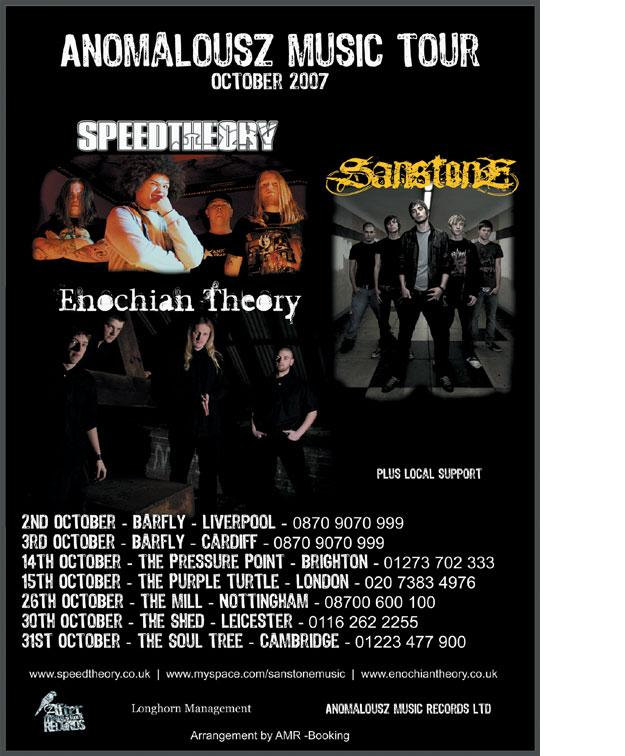
Theory in Practice Tour poster

To further support the release of the EP and the "Namyamka" single, the band booked and embarked on their first UK tour, entitled 'Theory in Practice'. It was promoted by their Anomalousz Music Records label and booked for them by The S-a-N Agency.

It initially ran through the month of October as a three-band bill with two other up-and-coming bands, SpeedTheory and About A Plane Crash, who had been receiving positive reviews of their own in many magazines and other media outlets. It took them to venues in Liverpool, Cardiff, Brighton, London, Nottingham, Leicester and Cambridge.

With the success of the first leg, and with positive feedback from crowds and venues alike, the band extended the tour, with a short second leg which ran in early December. The itinerary took the band to venues and places they had not seen during their first leg, including Plymouth, Exeter and Cheltenham.

=== Personnel change ===
On 21 December 2007, it was announced via the band's official website that guitarist Scott Ware had left the band. The remaining members wished him well in his future endeavors. The remaining members continued as Enochian Theory and auditioned for a new guitarist early in 2008. The band played a well-received and successful homecoming gig show at Wedgewood Rooms in Portsmouth 24 June, with a stand-in second guitarist.

In August 2008, while recording their new CD, the band decided that they would continue recording and touring as a three-piece.

=== Evolution: Creatio Ex Nihilio ===
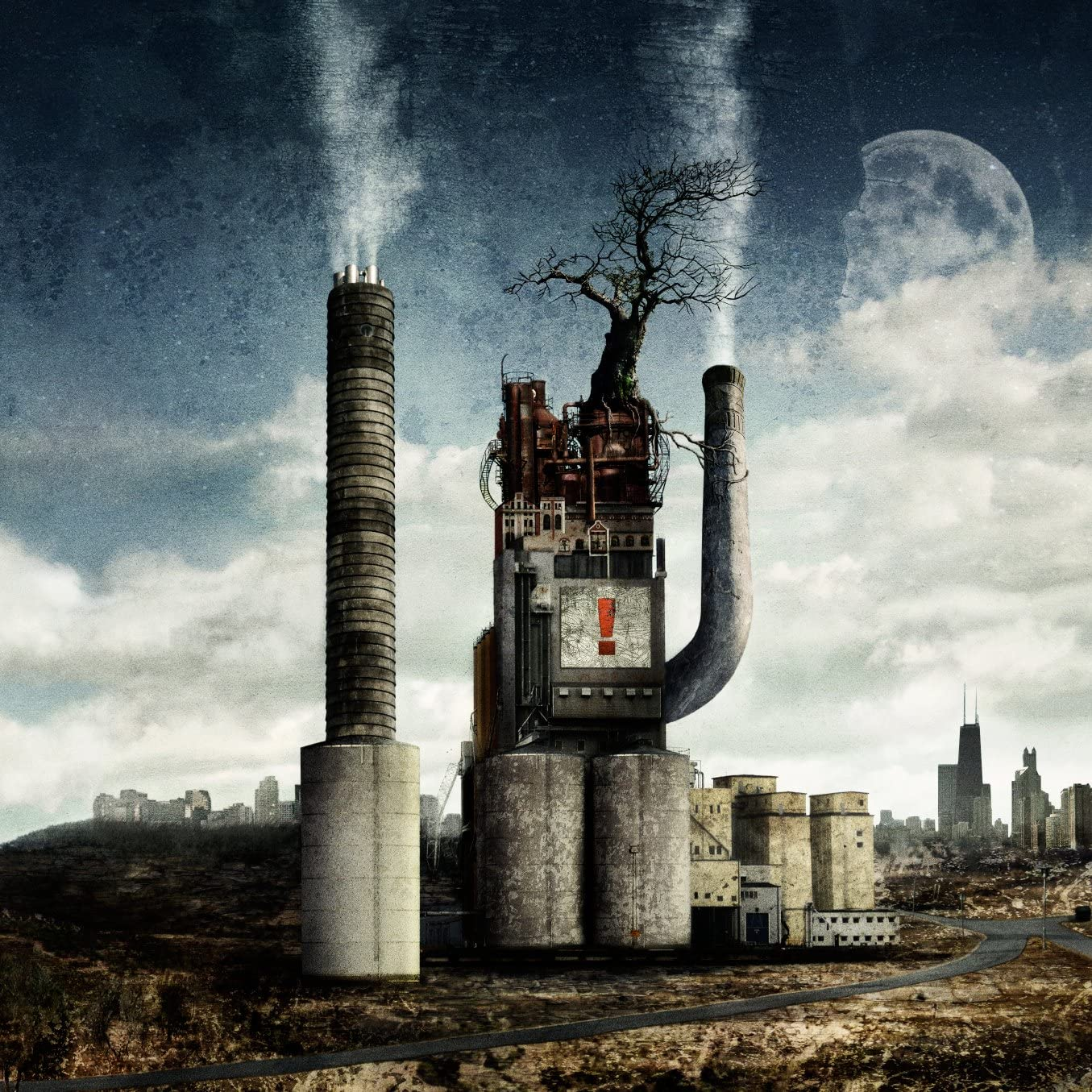
Evolution: Creatio Ex Nihilio

On 28 May 2008, the band officially announced on their website that their next full-length release would be called EVOLUTION: Creatio Ex Nihilio.

After the departure of Scott, Ben took over complete song-writing duties and submitted strong, completed demos for most of the album, with "The Fire Around the Lotus" being the first full song to be submitted to his bandmates.

In regards to the process of getting the record started, Ben is quoted as saying "It was a relief, you know? We'd not written anything new for almost 2 years and that was becoming a thing that was destroying the band. I won't blame anyone or anything, but simply say the relief I had at writing 'The Fire Around The Lotus' and 'Waves of Ascension' was like a floodgate opening in me...and I never looked back. Someone had to write music...and I just let the voice in my head do it's thing."

The band had been working on the new material since the turn of the year and had thirteen tracks written and ready to take into the studio.

Pre-production for the new recording began at the beginning of July, with the recording of the album completed on 12 October 2008. The finished recording was mixed and mastered in Sweden by David Castillo, who had co-produced the Katatonia record The Great Cold Distance on the Peaceville label as well as mixing the Opeth record 'Watershed' on the Roadrunner Records label.

It was mixed in Castillo's recently completed new state-of-the-art recording facility Ghostward and had the honor of being the first project worked on there.

The artwork for the album was conceived and realized by Swedish artist Robin Portnoff, after the band sent him the lyrical and musical themes behind the album.

The band began their pre-release preparations by headlining a show at the Enska Club in Portsmouth on 2 May, and then providing support for chart-topping Australian rockers - The Butterfly Effect at their show at the Hamptons venue in Southampton on Thursday 14 May 2009.

In the weeks prior to its release, tracks from the new album received rotation on Kerrang radio and Bruce Dickinson's BBC 6 Music rock show.

The album was released through the band's own independent label on 3 August 2009, with CODE 7/Plastic Head Distribution once again handling distribution.

The release was met with exceptional reviews in musical publication across Europe, including the English, German and Polish editions of Metal Hammer, Classic Rock Magazine, Terrorizer, Zero Tolerance Magazine, Power Play, the German, Greek and Italian editions of Rock Hard, Big Cheese, Spanish magazine This Is Rock, Italian magazine Metal Maniac, Norwegian magazine Helvete, Finnish magazine Inferno and Romanian rock and metal magazine Maximum Rock. It was also reviewed on nearly 100 websites throughout Europe.

On 29 April 2010, the band released a press release via the musical press and their official website, saying they had signed a deal with Mascot Records. As part of this deal the album was re-released worldwide through the label on 27 September of that year.

=== Evolution: Creatio Ex Nihilio Tour (2009–2011) ===
In May 2009, Blabbermouth.net reported that the band had been confirmed to appear at the ProgPower Europe 2009 festival. Festival organisers were quoted saying "probably hardly anyone has ever heard of this band, but that will definitely change when they will release their new album in August 2009." and also "ENOCHIAN THEORY definitely will surprise many of you." The festival took place between 2–4 October at JC Sjiwa in Baarlo, The Netherlands.

On 11 November 2009, the official website for The Metalcamp festival confirmed that Enochian Theory were to co-headline the second stage at the 2010 event. Festival organisers at the time were quoted as saying "Enochian Theory are gaining more and more reputation with their music, crossing various genres. The aim of pushing themselves as musicians and expanding their sound further creates an even more epic addition to their already impressive repertoire". The festival took place between 5–11 July 2010 in Tolmin, Slovenia.

To support the release of the new album, the band began working with booking agents in the UK and around Europe to arrange their own tour. The tour itself began on 21 September and ran through into 2011 seeing them tour England but also make their first forays into Scotland, Holland, France, Ireland, Slovenia, Germany, Switzerland, Poland, Hungary and Slovakia.

During the course of the tour, the band have secured the prestigious support slot for Spocks Beard on a full European tour as well as Katatonia's show in Southampton, UK on 6 November 2009.

In conjunction with Classic Rock Magazine and Factory Music booking agency, Enochian Theory were part of the Progression 2.0. - 'The New Breed' UK tour in March 2011. They were joined by Touchstone and Jurojin. The itinerary for the tour covered Sheffield, Glasgow, Manchester, Bristol and London.

=== Life...And All It Entails ===
Following the conclusion of the Progression 2.0. tour, Ben began writing songs for the follow-up to Evolution: Creatio Ex Nihilio. By August the writing process was complete and they were ready to record.

The key difference between the debut record and this, is that Ben wrote and arranged it solely on his own, due to various external reasons.

"'Life...' is a tough record, personally. I was in a bit of a state, mentally...and perhaps it shows in the music and lyrics" said Ben when quizzed about the writing process.

Adding, "I just had to do it, expel some negaitivity and exorcise some demons...as if to say."

The album was recorded at the end of 2011, with the band adopting the role of lead producer and recording alongside noted engineer, Rob Aubrey, who previously had worked with Transatlantic, IQ, Spocks Beard and Tony Levin at his Aubitt Studios in Southampton, England.

In December 2011, the band's label announced the title and track-listing for the new album. Entitled Life...And All It Entails, the album will consist of 13 tracks.

This finished recording would be the second full album by the band and was released on 12 March 2012 on the Mascot Record/Music Theories Recordings label.

Enochian Theory shot a music video for the track "Inversions" with the UK production company "One Name Films". This video would feature "The Lost Orchestra" visually for the first time and was released for internet viewing in May 2012.

In August 2012, Enochian Theory signed a Publishing deal with "Northern Music", the management company behind acts such as Devin Townsend, Opeth, and Katatonia.

=== Life...And All It Entails Tour (2012–2013) ===
On 7 July 2012, Enochian Theory performed at the Night of the Prog festival in St Goarhousen, Germany. They joined Steve Hackett & Band, Spock's Beard, Katatonia, The Flower Kings, Arena and others performing at the two-day festival.

The band undertook three exclusive headline shows during September 2012, where they played Evolution: Creatio Ex Nihilio and Life... And All It Entails in their entirety over the course of the evening. These were held in England and Germany.

Following these dates, the band were the support for Tesseract at their shows in Brighton and Milton Keynes on 17 and 19 October 2012.

On 19 November 2013, the band played their largest UK show, while providing support for Gong at their show at the 02 Shepherds Bush Empire.

On 1 March 2013, the band embarked on a fifteen date European tour with Nuclear Blast recording artists Threshold. The tour took in England, Holland, Germany, Poland, Austria, Slovenia and Belgium. This was Enochian Theory's most extensive tour of mainland Europe to date.

On 6 April 2013, the band provided support band for The Von Hertzen Brothers in Cardiff, Wales.

On 7 April 2013, Enochian Theory appeared at the HRH Prog festival. They were joined on the bill by Hawkwind, The Enid, Caravan, Mostly Autumn, The Crazy World of Arthur Brown, It Bites and many more. The event was sponsored by Classic Rock's Prog magazine.

On 13 April 2013, the band played an exclusive headline show in Southampton UK, where they again played Evolution: Creatio Ex Nihilio and Life... And All It Entails in their entirety over the course of the evening.

Following the band's appearance at the HRH Prog festival and headline show in Southampton, they embarked on a UK tour with The Enid. The tour ran from 23 – 25 April with shows in Newcastle, Glasgow and Manchester. They then played a further three shows with The Enid on 10, 30 and 31 May visiting Leicester, Birmingham and London.

The band ended the touring cycle for the album providing support for Tesseract on their UK tour between 12–16 May. They visited Sheffield, Glasgow, Manchester, Bristol and London.

=== Hiatus and current projects ===
In 2018 the band announced they were going on an indefinite hiatus.

Since then, Ben Harris-Hayes has released several singles and two albums under the 'OCEANICA' name to critical acclaim. The debut album OneDark was released in 2019 with the follow up Panta Rhei being released in 2023. The next release is a twenty one minute EP entitled Try Not To Dwell On It... which is due for release on the 1st of July 2025. https://oceanicauk.bandcamp.com/

Shaun Rayment launched his own recording studio company "SDR Audio Production" in 2014, and continues to work as a mastering engineer in the UK. https://www.sdraudioproduction.co.uk

== Previous members ==
Scott Ware – guitar (2004–2007)

== Discography ==
- Our Lengthening Shadows (2005)
- A Monument to the Death of an Idea (2006)
- Evolution: Creatio Ex Nihilio (2009)
- Life...And All It Entails (2012)
