= Kill It Live =

2013 live album by New Found Glory

Live album by New Found Glory
- Released: October 7, 2013
- Recorded: March 27–28, 2013 at Chain Reaction, Anaheim, California
- Genres: Pop punk; alternative rock; melodic hardcore
- Length: 67:54
- Label: Violently Happy/Bridge Nine
- Producers: Paul Miner, New Found Glory

New Found Glory chronology
Mania (2013)	Kill It Live (2013)	Resurrection (2014)

Singles from Kill It Live
- 1. "Connect the Dots" Released: September 10, 2013

Kill It Live is the first live album by American rock band New Found Glory. It was recorded during two sold-out shows at the Chain Reaction music venue in Anaheim, California between March 27—28, 2013. It was first released on October 7, 2013 in the United Kingdom, before its wider release in other regions soon after. It was issued through imprint label Violently Happy Records, a partnership between independent label Bridge Nine Records and the band's guitarist Chad Gilbert.

The first night of recording was infamous after Gilbert collapsed on stage after being shocked by a microphone. It is believed the guitarist received a jolt due to poor wiring on the microphone. Gilbert was taken to the hospital, but released the following day having been given the all clear.

The album features seventeen live cuts from the two dates, as well as three new studio tracks that were recorded by Paul Miner and mixed by Kyle Black. The album was made available to pre-order on August 27, and was preceded by single "Connect the Dots."

== Background and recording ==
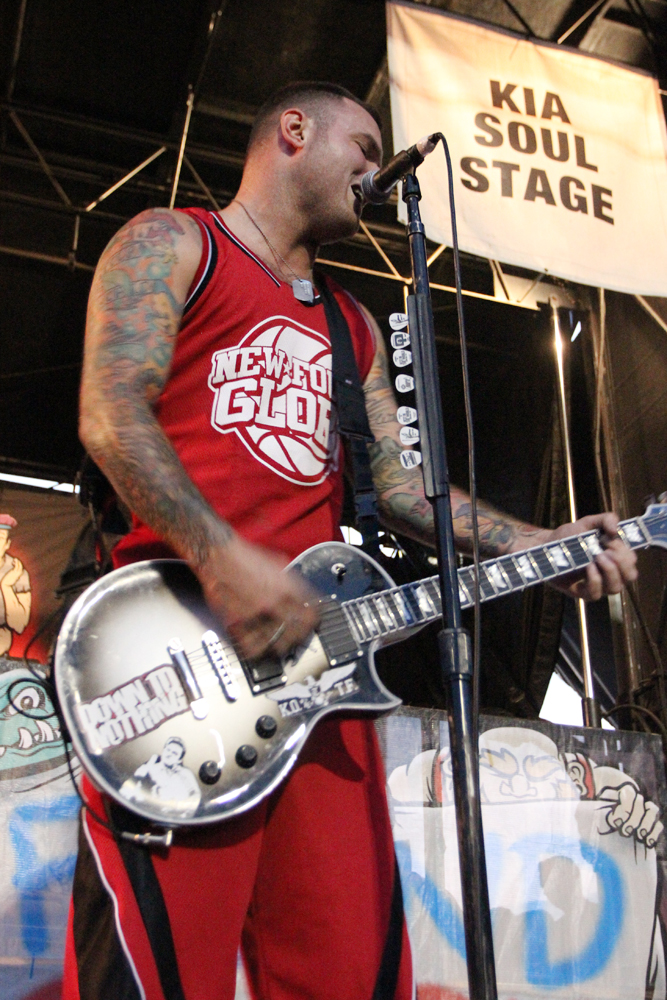
Lead guitarist Chad Gilbert was shocked during the first night of recording.

In October 2011, the band released their seventh studio album Radiosurgery via Epitaph Records. To promote the album, the band headlined the Rockstar-sponsored Pop Punks Not Dead Tour in the United States ahead of Set Your Goals, The Wonder Years, Man Overboard, and This Time Next Year. Promotion of the album continued as the band toured South America in January 2012, before headlining the 2012 Kerrang! Tour alongside Sum 41. Later in November, Billboard magazine reported that the band would be going on "hiatus" following an interview with Jordan Pundik. This was however strongly dismissed by the band, posting on their website that Pundik had been misconstrued during the interview. Chad Gilbert later clarified that the band didn't intend to release a new studio album until at least 2014, before confirming they would be recording a live album the following year.

The band then announced a special Christmas-themed acoustic EP to be released on December 1, featuring two original songs and three covers, including Bing Crosby's "White Christmas" and Nat King Cole's "The Christmas Song." A Very New Found Glory Christmas was released on cassette tape and limited to 2,000 copies. In January 2013, AbsolutePunk announced that the band would be recording their first live album over two nights at the Chain Reaction music venue in Anaheim, California between March 27–28. The band specifically chose Chain Reaction due to its relatively small capacity and because the venue had hosted the band regularly during their earlier days. An incentive for fans attending over the two nights would be each individual would have their photograph taken and included in a collage for the album art. Jordan Pundik later commented that, "I think the live record definitely captures how we are as a live band, with the crowd interaction and people singing along, it really sounds awesome in my opinion, we've been getting mixes back from it." It was also confirmed by the band that Radiosurgery was their final release via Epitaph Records following completion of a two-album deal, leaving the band an independent act.

The first of two live shows was held on March 27, but was interrupted after Chad Gilbert received an electric shock on stage by a microphone. It was reported that he received a jolt due to poor wiring on the mic. Gilbert was taken to hospital, but released the following day having been given the all clear. Gilbert has little recollection of the incident, but was told he "passed out" and then "hit his head." Because of this, medical staff at the hospital performed a CAT scan as a precaution before his discharge. In an interview with Alternative Press, the band revealed that during the initial editing stage of post-production, they had intended to leave the moment of the zap in the recording amongst other between-song banter. However, upon hearing the recording, it was immediately omitted due to sounding "really fucking morbid." Gilbert explained that, "you just hear, like, a little noise and then people are really quiet and freaking out in a weird way. And it’s just not cool. You’re having fun and then you’re like, “Uh-oh.” It really just lost all of the fun out of the record." Because of the incident on March 27, the majority of material used for the album was taken from the second night of recording after Gilbert had used a specially requested wireless microphone.

Aside from the live set, the band recorded 3 new studio tracks specifically for the album. "I Want to Believe", "Connect the Dots", and "First Bite" were tracked at Buzzbomb Sound Labs in Orange, California with Paul Miner and Kyle Black. The new songs were predominately written during soundchecks for the Sticks and Stones 10th Anniversary Tour, according to Gilbert. The guitarist explained, "There is a reason why they are a little bit more energetic, because we’re on that tour and it’s just wild and we’re playing and you just start writing." New song "I Want to Believe" is about "that whole thing in music that’s going on and questioning a band’s integrity. Are you doing this because you really love it or are you doing it because you’re checking in and checking out when your bank account gets low? Are you willing to play in front of five people when the going gets rough, or is that not why you’re here? It’s about questioning bands’ intentions, I guess. And there are so many bands I think you can question that you can’t even narrow it down to one."

== Release and promotion ==
The band first announced Kill It Live in July, with a slated release date of October 8. Shortly afterwards, "Connect the Dots" was announced as a limited edition single to precede the album. It was released as a digital download on September 10, before a 7" vinyl limited to just 1,000 pressings across three variants on September 17. The single featured title track "Connect the Dots", as well as live cuts of "Truck Stop Blues" and "Better Off Dead", which were recorded during the live shows in Anaheim, but not included in the final cut of Kill It Live. Following the single release, the band announced a co-headline tour with Chicago punk band Alkaline Trio. With support from H_{2}O, the tour commenced on October 23 in San Francisco, through November 25 in Tucson.

== Reception ==
=== Critical response ===
Professional ratings
Review scores
Source	Rating
AllMusic	4/5 stars
Kerrang!	4/5 stars
Rock Sound	7/10
The Examiner	5/5 stars

Gregory Heaney of AllMusic gave Kill It Live a favorable four-star review. He credited the band for becoming an "enduring force in pop-punk" and noted how the "live album does a great job of harnessing the live energy of not just the band, but of the fans. This makes for a live album that not only appeals to longtime fans, but feels like the best greatest-hits compilation a new listener could ask for."

== Track listing ==
All songs written and composed by New Found Glory.

Kill It Live
No.	Title	Original release	Length
1.	"Intro" (Live)	Catalyst	1:04
2.	"Understatement" (Live)	Sticks and Stones	3:04
3.	"Don't Let Her Pull You Down" (Live)	Not Without a Fight	3:39
4.	"All Downhill From Here" (Live)	Catalyst	3:05
5.	"Anthem for the Unwanted" (Live)	Radiosurgery	3:24
6.	"At Least I'm Known for Something" (Live)	Catalyst	3:32
7.	"Sonny" (Live)	Sticks and Stones	3:40
8.	"Something I Call Personality" (Live)	Sticks and Stones	2:40
9.	"Boy Crazy" (Live)	New Found Glory	3:18
10.	"Tip of the Iceberg" (Live)	Tip of the Iceberg	3:10
11.	"Coming Home" (Live)	Coming Home	3:31
12.	"Forget My Name" (Live)	Sticks and Stones	3:09
13.	"Sincerely Me" (Live)	New Found Glory	3:46
14.	"Hit or Miss" (Live)	Nothing Gold Can Stay	5:14
15.	"Truth of My Youth" (Live)	Catalyst	3:00
16.	"The Story So Far" (Live)	Sticks and Stones	5:31
17.	"My Friends Over You" (Live)	Sticks and Stones	4:11
18.	"I Want to Believe"	New studio track	2:54
19.	"Connect the Dots"	New studio track	3:11
20.	"First Bite"	New studio track	2:51
Total length:			67:54

Australian bonus track
No.	Title	Original release	Length
21.	"Truck Stop Blues" (Live)	Not Without a Fight	2:19
Total length:			70:13

== Personnel ==
The following personnel contributed to Kill It Live, as adapted from AllMusic.

New Found Glory

- Jordan Pundik — lead vocals
- Chad Gilbert — lead guitar, backing vocals
- Steve Klein — rhythm guitar
- Ian Grushka — bass guitar
- Cyrus Bolooki — drums, percussion

Production

- Paul Miner — recording, engineering
- Kyle Black — mixing
- Justin Benner — mixing assistant
- Kevin Martin — mixing assistant
- Mike Piacentini — mastering
- Kyle Crawford — art direction, design
- Jon Weiner — photography

== Charts ==
Chart (2013)	Peak position
UK Rock & Metal Albums (Official Charts)	36
US Billboard 200	133
US Independent Albums (Billboard)	25
US Top Rock Albums (Billboard)	44
US Vinyl Albums (Billboard)	10

== Release history ==
Region	Date	Label	Format	Catalogue #
United Kingdom	October 7, 2013	Violently Happy/Bridge Nine	CD, double LP, digital download	B9R198/VHR006
United States	October 8, 2013	Violently Happy/Bridge Nine	CD, double LP, digital download	B9R198/VHR006
Japan	October 8, 2013	Violently Happy/Bridge Nine	CD, double LP, digital download	B9R198/VHR006
Germany	October 8, 2013	Violently Happy/Bridge Nine	CD, double LP, digital download	B9R198/VHR006
Australia	October 25, 2013	3 Wise/Bridge Nine	CD, double LP, digital download	B9R198/VHR006
New Zealand	October 25, 2013	3 Wise/Bridge Nine	CD, double LP, digital download	B9R198/VHR006
