= Evolution: Creatio Ex Nihilio =

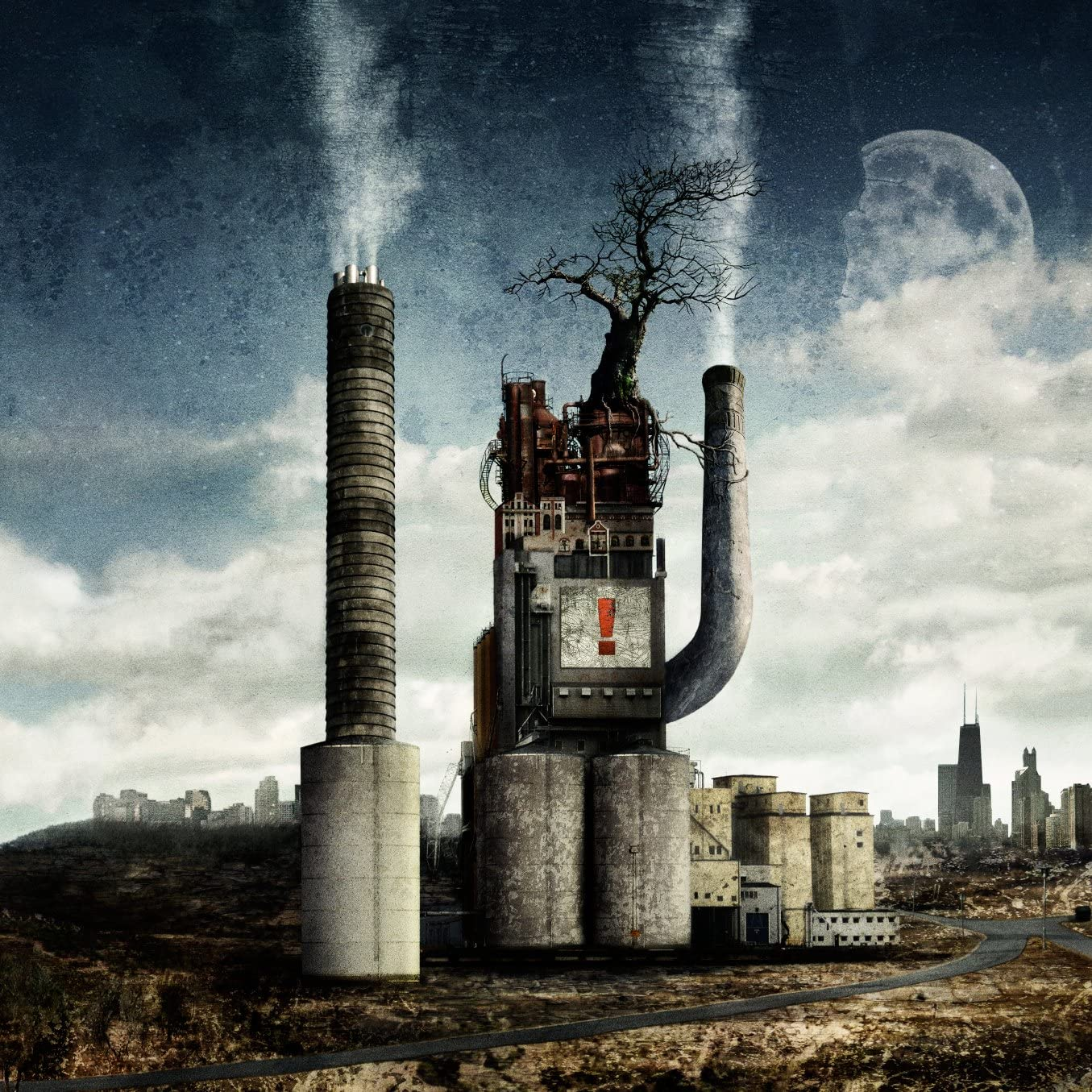

Studio album by Enochian Theory
- Released: 3 August 2009
- Recorded: July – October 2008
- Studios: Etherial Tantrum Studio, Portsmouth; The Old Blacksmiths Studio, Portsmouth; Rossgill Studios, Portsmouth
- Genre: Progressive rock
- Length: 48:59
- Label: Mascot Records

Enochian Theory chronology
| A Monument to the Death of an Idea (2006) | Evolution: Creatio Ex Nihilio (2009) | Life...And All It Entails (2012) |

Professional ratings
Review scores
| Source | Rating |
|---|---|
| Classic Rock Magazine - | (Favourable) |
| Terrorizer | 8/10 stars |
| Metal Hammer Magazine UK | 8/10 stars |
| Metal Hammer Magazine Germany | 5/7 stars |
| Metal Hammer Magazine Poland | 4/5 stars |
| Powerplay magazine | 9/10 stars |
| Zero Tolerance Magazine | 4/6 stars |
| Big Cheese | 3/5 stars |
| Rock Hard Germany | 7.5/10 stars |
| Rock Hard Greece | 7.5/10 stars |
| Rock Hard Italy | 8/10 stars |

Evolution: Creatio Ex Nihilio is the first full-length album by Enochian Theory. It was released initially by their independent label on 3 August 2009, and had a worldwide major label release by Mascot records on 27 September 2010.

== Conception ==
Due to outside issues and influences the band needed to write and record a new album in a very short period. As a result, the vocalist/songwriter Ben Harris-Hayes began writing in January 2008 and continued until March, when the band was sure they had enough material to proceed.

To accommodate the short time frame, the songwriting process differed from their previous releases, with the vocalist composing all the music and main structures. Using specific music software packages and MIDI sequencing and samples to recreate a full band performance, Harris-Hayes could see how sections flowed and how they would sound with a full band playing the songs.

The band then worked on these songs together, when they practiced three times a week at their Pyres of Mithrandire studio and rehearsal space. When they were sure that the songs would work as a three piece band, Harris-Hayes started working with The Lost Orchestra to compose and perform the album's orchestral pieces.

With thirteen tracks written and ready to take into the studio, pre-production began at the beginning of July.

== Recording ==
The drums were recorded at The Old Blacksmiths Studio in Portsmouth with the band again working with the Emmy nominated engineer, Rich Tamblyn, who had co-produced the band's A Monument to the Death of an Idea EP. The guitars, bass guitar and vocals were recorded with Josh Eaves and Ross Gill at Rossgill Studios in the city and the orchestral arrangements and recording were completed at Harris-Hayes's home Ethereal Tantrum studio. Recording of the album was completed on 12 October 2008.

The finished recording was mixed and mastered in Sweden by David Castillo, who had co-produced Katatonia's album, The Great Cold Distance, on the Peaceville label as well as mixing the Opeth album Watershed on the Roadrunner Records label. It was mixed in Castillo's recently completed new state-of-the-art recording facility Ghostward and was the first project worked on there.

The artwork for the album was conceived and realized by the Swedish artist Robin Portnoff, who had been introduced to the band by Castillo.

== Pre-release ==
In May 2009, the band placed three of the new tracks, "Apathia", "Movement" and "Waves of Ascension", on their website and Myspace page.

Although the album was not due to be released until August 2009, pre-release copies started to make waves in the industry with the organisers of the ProgPower Europe festival booking them to appear at the 2009 event. Blabbermouth.net quoted the festival organisers who said, "Probably hardly anyone has ever heard of this band, but that will definitely change when they will release their new album in August 2009," and "ENOCHIAN THEORY definitely will surprise many of you."

Distribution for the band's independently released CD and downloads was once again handled by CODE 7/Plastic Head Distribution with the band keen to build on the working relationship that began with their A Monument to the Death of an Idea and "Namyamka" releases.

In the buildup to its independent release, tracks from the new album received rotation on Kerrang radio and Bruce Dickinson's BBC 6 Music rock show.

== Release and reception ==
The album was released through the band's own independent Anomalousz Music Records label on 3 August 2009 followed by wide press coverage in music publications across Europe including the English, German and Polish editions of Metal Hammer, Classic Rock, Terrorizer, Zero Tolerance, Rock Sound, the German and Greek editions of Rock Hard, Powerplay rock and metal magazine, Big Cheese, the Spanish magazine This Is Rock, the Italian magazine Metal Maniac, the Norwegian magazine Helvete, the Finnish magazine Inferno and the Romanian rock and metal magazine Maximum Rock:

- Metal Hammer called the CD "Cryptic but captivating prog-metal" and said "...Enochian Theory has woven a remarkable tapestry" defining their music as "...Tool-esque obliqueness and sweeping symphonic statements".
- Classic Rock called the CD "...a wonderfully balanced album that is as intense as it is relenting" and stated that "the south coast trio have the exceptional ability to carve out their niche – they just need to be given the chance".
- Terrorizer said in their review, "A bracing change from Brit metal bandwagon chasers, this intrepid trio are strapped into seats on the prog mothership, with a long and beguiling journey ahead of them...think brave, inventive and eccentric: this is an absorbing debut from a band that don’t even know where the box is, let alone why anyone would think inside it."
- Zero Tolerance called the album "an intriguing, multi layered slab of British prog that lilts between Marillion-esque passages before lurching into moments of crushing aggression ala Katatonia whilst retaining a flair for the eccentric and the unpredictable" and "Musically brilliant and ever evolving, Evolution is fine album that, just like its creators, deserves the attention of any self-respecting prog-lover."
- Powerplay commented in its review, "The wait has been worthwhile as it’s another exciting set of songs that should see these guys take another massive step up the rock and metal ladder. It is a very well crafted and executed set of songs. With impressive and varied guitar work throughout, this is an album that makes you want to lift that 'axe' yourself and have a go yourself… A great album"
- Big Cheese said in its review, "When they do decide to rock the hell out, they’re actually pretty bloody good, with juddering riffs and harsh vocal that pepper the likes of 'At Great Odds With…’ and 'A Monument to the Death of an Idea' sounding damn impressive. Packed full of potential, Enochian Theory's skills are rapidly catching up to their ambitions."

== Worldwide re-release through Mascot records ==
On 29 April 2010, the band announced they had signed a deal with Mascot records. As part of this deal, the album was re-released worldwide through the label on 27 September 2010.

== Track listing ==
All music written by Enochian Theory, lyrics by Harris-Hayes:

1. Every Ending Has A Beginning... (1:08)
2. The Dimensionless Monologue (6:55):
  - Tedium (i) 2:20
  - The Dimensionless Monologue (ii) 2:59
  - T.D.M (iii) 1:36
3. At Great Odds With... (5:07)
4. Apathia (3:58)
5. Triumvirate (2:35)
6. Movement (5:14)
7. After The Movement (2:53)
8. Waves of Ascension (6:57)
9. The Fire Around The Lotus (7:15)
10. The Living Continuum (2:22)
11. A Monument to the Death of an Idea (4:36)

Total running time: 48:59

== Personnel ==
- Ben Harris Hayes – vocals and guitar
- Shaun Rayment - bass guitar
- Sam Street - drums and percussion
- The Lost Orchestra - pianos, synthesizers, extra sounds and orchestral performance
