= Life...And All It Entails =

Studio album by Enochian Theory
- Released: March 12, 2012
- Recorded: 2011
- Genre: Progressive rock
- Length: 62:39
- Label: Mascot Records
- Producer: Enochian Theory

Enochian Theory chronology
Evolution: Creatio Ex Nihilio (2009)	Life...And All It Entails (2012)

Professional ratings
Review scores
Source	Rating
Classic Rock Magazine Prog	(Favourable)
Metal Hammer Magazine Germany	6/7 stars
Rock Hard Germany	8.5/10 stars
Heavy! magazine	10/12 stars
Powerplay magazine	10/10 stars

Life...And All It Entails is the second full-length album by Enochian Theory The album received its worldwide major label release via Mascot records on March 12, 2012.

== Conception ==
Following extensive touring in support of Evolution: Creatio Ex Nihilio through 2009 and 2010, Ben Harris-Hayes began writing new material in early 2011, trying new ideas and implementing some of the new techniques he had learned in the previous few years. In mid-2011, with 90% of the album written and in listenable demo format, Ben shared his demos with Shaun and Sam for listening and they began working together on the bass and drums. The band began working officially on their second full-length album and first original recording for new label, Mascot Records. The album was composed and ready for production in August 2011.

== Recording ==
The band entered Aubitt Studios in Southampton, UK with engineer/mixer, Rob Aubrey to record the new album. They had met and worked with him the previous year during the band’s tour with Spocks Beard. Rob’s previous history with artists such as IQ, Tony Levin and Transatlantic only helped with the decision for the band to work with him on this important record. Aubrey recorded and mixed the album with the band over the course of several weeks.

The finished album would feature thirteen tracks comprising twelve new compositions and a remastered version of The Fire Around The Lotus from their previous album.

The band also returned to artist Robin Portnoff who had provided the striking visuals for the band's previous release. Since that release, they had always considered Robin as a very important part of the band and it was only right he completed the artwork for the new album, expanding on the visual world he'd created for the band.

== Release and reception ==
The new album “Life... And All It Entails” was released on March 12, 2012 and once again gained high appreciation within the European Press. Steven Wilson of the band Porcupine Tree, praised the new album, commenting on the production and craftsmanship of the song writing.

- Classic Rock Magazine Prog - said of the album "Less than two years after the release of their debut full-length, the dizzyingly kaleidoscopic Evolution: Creatio Ex Nihilio, Enochian Theory have again assembled an astonishing broad and brave collection of subtly subversive art rock... "
- Powerplay Magazine - rated the album 10 out of 10 stars and said of the album "An outstanding second release from the brightest stars on the UK prog scene." and "...ET goes from strength to strength"

== Music video ==
Enochian Theory shot a music video for the track “Inversions” with the UK production company “One Name Films”. This video would feature “The Lost Orchestra” visually for the first time and was released for internet viewing in May 2012.

== Track listing ==
All music written by Enochian Theory, lyrics by Harris-Hayes

- (Zero Is Also A Number)
1. This Aching Isolation
2. Hz
3. Non Sum Qualis Eram
4. Distances
5. Inversions
6. Creatio Ex Nihilio
7. In Times of Silence
8. For Your Glory, Great Deceiver
9. Nisi Credideritis, Non Intelligetis
10. The Motives of the Machine
11. Singularities
12. Loves
13. The Fire Around the Lotus (Remastered)
- Note: On the official CD release of the album, there is a 'pre-gap' song that can be found by 'rewinding' the first track in a standard CD player. This was inserted by Ben as support "to those who buy the physical CD and whom still use CD players in an age of digital disposability..."

== Personnel ==
- Ben Harris Hayes – Vocals, Guitar and Piano
- Shaun Rayment - Bass guitar
- Sam Street - Drums and percussion
- The Lost Orchestra - Synthesizers, Extra sounds and Orchestral performance
