= Radiosurgery (album) =

Studio album by New Found Glory
- Released: September 30, 2011
- Recorded: April–June 2011
- Studios: The Casita, Los Angeles
- Genre: Pop-punk
- Length: 33:45
- Label: Epitaph
- Producer: Neal Avron

New Found Glory chronology
2010 Summer Tour (2010)	Radiosurgery (2011)	A Very New Found Glory Christmas (2012)

Singles from Radiosurgery
- 1. "Radiosurgery" Released: August 2, 2011; 2. "Anthem for the Unwanted" Released: November 22, 2011; 3. "Summer Fling, Don't Mean a Thing" Released: June 14, 2012

Radiosurgery is the seventh studio album by American rock band New Found Glory. It was first released in Australia on September 30, 2011 before being released on October 3, 2011 in Europe, and in the US on October 4 through independent label Epitaph Records. It is the band's final studio album to feature founding guitarist Steve Klein. To follow up predecessor Not Without a Fight (2009), the band began writing new material during their stint on the 2010 Honda Civic Tour. After self-producing a set of demos and contacting long-term record producer Neal Avron, the band went on to record the album in Avron's home recording studio over a period of three months in 2011. The quintet set out to write an album that paid homage to classic punk rock records that first inspired them to form a band during the 1990s. Listening extensively to the likes of early Green Day and Ramones, New Found Glory strove to create a sound that could "bridge the gap" between old and new generations of the genre.

The album title is a reference to the actual medical procedure radiosurgery, with the lyrics directly influenced by a troubled divorce suffered within the band. Radiosurgery was written as a concept album about the different emotions an individual goes through after a separation, including feelings of regret, sadness, and insanity. The band looked up several brain surgeries, settling on Radiosurgery, using the idea that instead of using the procedure to remove a tumor from the brain, it could remove memories.

The first official single from the album was title track "Radiosurgery", released on August 2, 2011 Upon its release, Radiosurgery was a moderate commercial success, debuting at number twenty six on the Billboard 200, number four on the Top Independent Albums chart, and number one on the Hard Rock Albums chart. The album was also well received by music critics, who noted its throwback sound and infectious songwriting, seeing it receive various accolades from within the rock music community.

== Background ==
In March 2009, the band released their sixth studio album Not Without a Fight after signing with Epitaph Records. The band then underwent extensive touring to promote the album, including a headlining slot at the 2010 Slam Dunk Festival alongside Alkaline Trio and Capdown. Later, following a bout of pneumonia, Chad Gilbert underwent surgery to remove suspicious cells found in his thyroid before releasing some solo work on his website under the pseudonym of What's Eating Gilbert?. Gilbert later posted on his Twitter account that the surgery had been a success, before the band started a new tour to promote the tenth anniversary re-release of their self-titled second album. The anniversary tour saw the band play the album in its entirety, although despite Gilbert's recovery, Anthony Raneri of Bayside replaced him for the first three legs of the tour as a precautionary measure. It was during the band's stretch on the 2010 Honda Civic Tour that they began writing new material. Frontman Jordan Pundik told Texas-based publication MagX in September that a new album would "probably be recorded in January", and upon being asked what the new material would sound like, he added "We always let it happen. We're a real band. We obviously have a vision of how we want it to "sound" but the songs are always what feels right and true to who we are."

Shortly afterward in a November interview with Reverb music magazine, the band's chief lyricist Klein reported that new demos were in the works and that his early indications were that the songs would make for a "really catchy summer record." Klein went on to explain the band's procedure when writing new songs, noting that in the early stages Gilbert will write new guitar riffs, before sending them to Klein, who in turn begins work on lyrics and harmonies alongside Pundik. The band will then collectively begin writing their own instrumental parts, with Klein summarizing, "Ever since we started the band we've always had the same kind of writing routine where we write the music first, do some lyrics and then begin to record demos." Pundik added that unlike earlier in their career, the band can now simultaneously work on new material together over the internet. "The overall process hasn't really changed, but now it's kind of like we can do it through Skype, or iChat or something. It's kind of cool because we can be at home and work on songs. Before, when we would write songs we would write on the road touring in the van; I remember Cyrus playing drums on the steering wheel and Chad with an acoustic guitar in the passenger seat, you know? So it's definitely a lot easier." In the new year, the band released a teaser trailer, containing footage of them in the studio recording demos.

== Recording and production ==
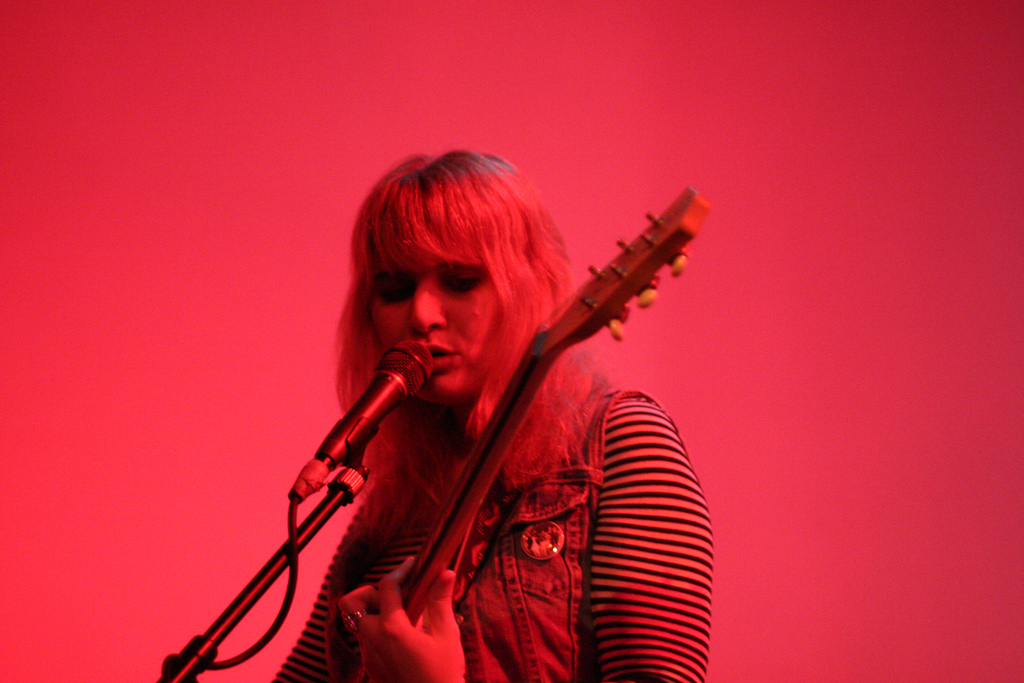
Bethany Cosentino of indie rock band Best Coast performed guest vocals on album track "Caught in the Act"

Having not worked directly with Neal Avron for six years, the band had wanted to recruit him once again to produce a new album. Avron was responsible for producing the band's three most commercially successful records; New Found Glory (2000), Sticks and Stones (2002), and Catalyst (2004). The band wrote and self-produced three demos, before sending them to Avron by email for his evaluation. However, Avron was not overly impressed, stating the songs were "okay, but I don't really think they're that great." The band responded by completing a new set of six tracks, but no avail, as the producer was still not convinced. This left the band frustrated, as they believed the new material to among the best songs they had written. Gilbert was persistent though, and after recording another eight demos that went back-and-forth with the producer, the band announced in November that Avron had agreed to produce the album and recording would commence in the new year. Gilbert has said that this process with Avron helped push the band to compose better songs; "There's only one song that we're recording for the album from the original demos we sent him. It was cool having him push us, because we sort of had a vision on this record, and he really wanted to get that out of us. It's a step forward for our band, definitely [in terms of] songwriting." Gilbert has called Avron the "unofficial sixth member" of the band, because of his open honesty and willingness to push the band. The band entered Avron's home studio, named The Casita, in April to begin tracking. Aside from writing and recording two new songs in May, the remaining batch of songs had been with the band a long time, making recording "rather easy".

The producer is known for his particular recording techniques and prefers laying down the rhythm section of guitar and drums first, as opposed to the usual method of drums and bass guitar. Avron has noted, "Over the years I've had issues with recording bass first, especially when someone is hitting the strings really hard. For me it's difficult to tell whether the bass is in tune, because the fundamental is so low. When laying the rhythm guitars down first, it's much easier to tell whether the bass is out of tune or not. It also means that the bass has a place to fit." Indeed, Pundik reflected on the recording process by stating, "It was pretty smooth, we kind of go in there and do the drums first, which takes a couple of days. Then you do the guitars before I lay down vocals. It's kind of like this factory. It's not like before when we were trying to figure out what guitar sound we wanted, now we've established how we want to sound and what we want to do." The band revealed that Avron suggested "simplifying" some of the songs whilst recording. According to Klein, certain songs had "crazy guitars", but Avron pushed the band to "make the melodies and vocals stand out, to enforce the lyrical themes." Gilbert had the idea to use his backing vocals more prominently on the record, hoping to add some extra dynamics to a songs chorus. He noted that Rancid's Tim Armstrong and Lars Frederiksen were an influence on this decision. Towards the end of recording, the band invited Bethany Cosentino of indie rock band Best Coast to provide backing vocals on a track later confirmed to be titled "Caught in the Act". Cosentino is a fan of the band, and became friends through Twitter. Gilbert explained that the song is the "slowest" on the record, despite each being "upbeat", and somehow "called for a female backing vocal". Cosentino later commented after hearing the final version of the track that she was "stoked" for people to hear it and called it a "classic pop punk gem". Recording was completed at the beginning of June, with the band later confirming on June 18 that mixing and mastering had also been finalized. Avron mixed the album, while Ted Jensen mastered it at Sterling Sound.

== Composition ==
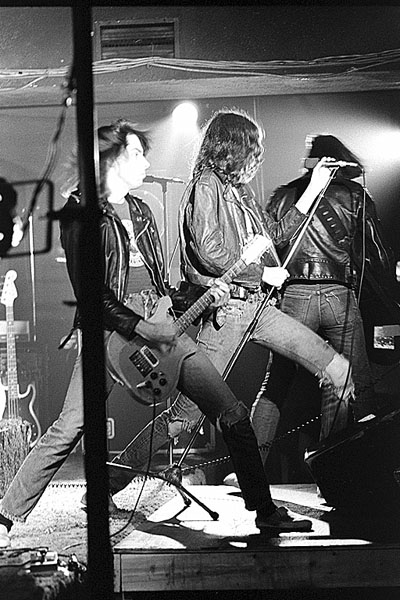
Punk rock acts, like the Ramones, were major influences during the writing of Radiosurgery.

Prior to writing the album, the band spent time revisiting music from their youth that first inspired them to be in a band. Gilbert described how he spent six months "only listening to the Ramones, old Lookout! Records stuff, Green Day's Dookie, Descendents, Rancid's Let's Go and that's pretty much it." Gilbert had a direct musical vision for the album, similar to how he describes that Coming Home (2006) had, as opposed to Not Without a Fight (2009), where the attitude was simply "let's record a New Found Glory album." The band strove to "apply the throwback vibe to their always-evolving style," by incorporating the elements from those classic albums; "it was simple, it was fun, it was heartfelt, but it also kind of had an attitude," with the hallmarks of their own career. Gilbert described how he wanted to "bridge the gap between generations", hoping for reactions such as "Dude that's totally Ramones, but it's not the Ramones, it's New Found Glory. Or like, Dude, that totally reminds me of when I heard Dookie for the first time, but it's totally not, it's New Found Glory." As such, the band were meticulous in the writing process, discarding anything that was not in line with the album's vision or songs that felt "safe". Gilbert described that because they wanted a "fun, punk, upbeat record," any songs he would write that appeared "a slower, mellower, mid-pace thing," would be scrapped. Pundik told Rock Sound magazine that, "[With Radiosurgery] we simplified the songs. There's no riffing or jamming going on. It's just straight up and in-your-face."

Lyrically, the album is about the mental state of dealing with different stages of a failed relationship. Similarly to Not Without a Fight, which dealt with the divorces suffered by Gilbert and Pundik, Radiosurgery was inspired by one band member almost "losing their mind." due to a "severe" separation. It was later revealed that it was in fact bassist Ian Grushka's divorce in October 2010 that inspired the record. Grushka's nine-year marriage, including two children, reached a bitter conclusion with Grushka reflecting, "It's crazy how quickly love can turn to hate. Basically, this last year, I've lost my mind completely. It takes time, it's been hard." The bassist turned to Klein for support, often writing notes and calling his bandmate over the phone to discuss his feelings. The album's lyrics are directly about the different emotions Grushka went through after the divorce, including sadness, regret, and feeling on the verge of insanity. In an interview with NME magazine, the guitarist pointed out, "If you're in a long-term relationship and it came to an end, you go through stages of regret, then you're sad, angry. Then you kind of lose your mind and want to go out with your friends, have a good time [and] get into trouble. Then you just want to forget this person. Our idea is that after going through all these stages, you can't get the past out of your head, so you could surgically remove it from your mind." The single "Radiosurgery" was one of the final songs written for the album and was chosen as the title track in order "to encompass the whole record, like the complete thought. Its concept is much like the film Eternal Sunshine of the Spotless Mind, according to Klein. The song also contains the lyric "it makes my brain hurt", a direct homage to the Screeching Weasel song "My Brain Hurts", while portraying a person suffering from auditory hallucination. Meanwhile, "Anthem for the Unwanted" is a song about "the point in a relationship where you pretty much are getting kicked out. It's pretty much the beginning of the end." While "I'm Not the One" is specifically themed around a one night stand, which Gilbert describes as "going out and doing something that you know you shouldn't be doing – and still going through with it. Because, that's life. People make mistakes."

"Radiosurgery"

"Trainwreck"
Samples of "Radiosurgery" and "Trainwreck". The lead single and title track from the album contains a guitar riff compared by critics to Green Day's earlier work, while elsewhere the album features "crunching, downward-aiming, dominating guitar riffs."

Early reactions to the single noted similarities to the earlier work of Green Day. In a track-by-track guide of the album, the band's drummer Cyrus Bolooki explained that "Drill it in My Brain" is a "pretty rhythmic song with a nice steady beat," while "Summer Thing, Don't Mean a Thing" contains "absurd amounts of percussion going on in the background of the verses", and "Map of Your Body" features a bridge that has almost a "punk rock prom vibe." Upon hearing an advance copy of the full album, AbsolutePunk CEO Jason Tate was of the opinion that the album was similar in style to the band's self-titled second album, while Thomas Nassiff expressed that "throughout the album, Gilbert and Klein combine for even more crunching, downward-aiming, dominating guitar riffs than ever." Annie Zaleski of Alternative Press suggested that musically, the album often recalls classic punk rock. "The jagged riffs of "Summer Fling, Don't Mean a Thing" echoes Cheap Trick's late 70s golden years. "Ready, Aim, Fire!" wouldn't be out of place on a Dropkick Murphys disc, while the speedy "Memories and Battle Scars" conjures the aggression of the Descendents." Tom Williams, writer for UK magazine Big Cheese, stated how he felt the album sounded like "millennium era NFG with nods to ulterior influences." Kerrang! journalist David McLaughlin thought the album contained a "familiar but mint-fresh sound." He explained how "eighth track "Caught in the Act" sways and grooves like a long-lost Weezer gem. Elsewhere, having gone back to their musical roots and digging out their favorite Green Day, Ramones, and Descendents records – a clear spirit of nostalgia has reignited their spark." The Boston Globe correspondent Scott McLennan described "Drill it in My Brain" as "a tangled mess of relationship rights and wrongs, all made palatable with a cool pop swagger and murky keyboard riff." While album closer "Map of Your Body" draws "a nice punk-rock-to-doo-wop connection." Andy Ritchie of Rock Sound noted that "the album's focus is "very much on back-to-basics pop punk. This is how the Ramones pioneered it, and how Green Day perfected it during their early days."

== Title and packaging ==
The deluxe edition CD packaging for Radiosurgery as designed by Kyle Crawford.

On May 12, 2011, the band announced to fans via a live video chat that their new album would be titled Radiosurgery and they hoped to release it sometime in September. The band's primary composer Gilbert has explained that the album title is a direct reference to the medical procedure radiosurgery, where a patient is treated by x rays or gamma rays to remove a tumor or growth from the brain. The band feel that the concept is very similar to the film Eternal Sunshine of the Spotless Mind, where a couple erase one another from their memories. Gilbert revealed that since the band last wrote new material in 2008, one member suffered a "severe" divorce. "It's for them to talk about, not me. Someone pretty much lost their mind [and] did a lot of things that were pretty scary for all of us. We've all been through that. I wrote about it on our website, certain things sort of haunt you in your life. That's where the title [Radiosurgery] comes from, it's like a brain surgery."

In the album's liner notes, a mock definition is printed that explains that Radiosurgery is "a medical procedure that allows non-invasive treatment used to target unwanted memories in the brain. Radiosurgery operates by directing highly focused waves of ionizing sound with high precision. It is a relatively recent technique (1997), which has been shown to be beneficial for the treatment of past regrets and lost love." On August 2, the album's artwork and packaging details were released. It was confirmed that the album would be available in a number of formats, including a standard CD, a deluxe edition double CD featuring four exclusive outtakes, including a cover of the Ramones hit "Blitzkrieg Bop", a limited pink vinyl LP, a special slipmat, as well as various other merchandise packages. The album booklet and cover art was designed by artist and clothes designer Kyle Crawford. The brain logo was designed to symbolise the theme of the album, with Gilbert explaining "We talked about the brain and Radiosurgery. We talked about wanting an image we could put on a lot of things. We wanted to have that feeling, that look."

== Release and promotion ==
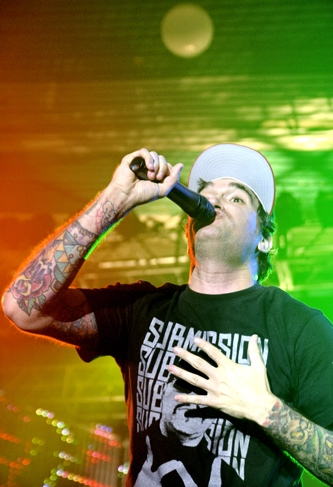
Following the release of Radiosurgery, New Found Glory headlined the Rockstar-sponsored Pop Punks Not Dead Tour ahead of Set Your Goals, The Wonder Years, Man Overboard, and This Time Next Year.

Following the completion of recording in mid-June, the band announced soon after that the lead single would be title track "Radiosurgery", later released as a digital download on August 2. That same day, the album's track listing, cover art and release details were also issued. It was confirmed that Epitaph Records would release the album on CD, vinyl LP, and digital download formats on September 30 in Australia, October 3 in Europe, and October 4 in the United States. American retailer Interpunk.com held a limited supply of albums available with the CD booklet exclusively signed by the band. Earlier, NME magazine reported that the band had confirmed a small run of club shows in the UK leading up to their main stage performances at the Reading and Leeds festivals in August. In direct promotion of the album release in October, it was announced on August 1 that the band would be headlining a 37-date Rockstar-sponsored "Pop Punks Not Dead Tour" in North America ahead of Set Your Goals, The Wonder Years, Man Overboard, and This Time Next Year. The tour commenced on October 6 in Santa Cruz, California and ran through to November 20 in San Diego. AbsolutePunk ran an exclusive competition on their website, with five pairs of free tickets available for the tour including a meet-and-greet with the band back stage. Anticipation for the album was increased when Alternative Press magazine issued their annual "20 Must-Hear Fall Releases" list, which included New Found Glory's Radiosurgery, while Rock Sound magazine called Radiosurgery, "the most eagerly anticipated pop-punk album of the summer." The Buffalo News noted that alongside another batch of strong releases within the genre, Radiosurgery is helping pop punk regain its relevance and popularity.

The following week, the band announced via Twitter that they would be shooting a music video for the title track. The video was shot on August 11 at the Linda Vista Hospital in Los Angeles with Meiert Avis directing and Jeremy Alter producing. It premiered on September 14. Aside from other promotional work in the UK leading up to their appearances at the Reading and Leeds Festivals, Gilbert and Pundik performed an exclusive acoustic version of "Radiosurgery" for music webzine Alter The Press. Kerrang! magazine announced on August 31 that the band had released a short making-of video with footage of them in the studio recording the album. In the fortnight prior to the album's release, the band ran three exclusive "World Premieres" with the LA based KROQ Radio. Album tracks "Anthem for the Unwanted", "I'm Not the One", and "Dumped" were streamed daily on 20, 21, and September 22 respectively. On September 27 it was announced that another album track, "Summer Fling, Don't Mean a Thing" would be available for free download on iTunes. That same day, it was revealed that Radiosurgery was being streamed online in its entirety via Alternative Press. Fans had to complete a game similar to Operation in order to unlock each track. On October 4, the group appeared on The Daily Habit performing the album's title-track. "Anthem for the Unwanted" was released to alternative radio stations on November 22. On December 1, a music video was released for "Anthem for the Unwanted". The group went a short tour in Brazil with support from Four Year Strong during January 2012. The band played in Porto Alegre on January 10, later playing Curitiba and São Paulo, before closing in Rio de Janeiro on January 15. Shortly afterwards, the band co-headlined the 2012 Kerrang! Tour during February in the UK alongside Sum 41. Following an appearance at Musink festival, the band toured Australia with Taking Back Sunday and This Time Next Year in April. On May 23, the group revealed they were filming a music video for "Summer Fling, Don't Mean a Thing". On June 14, the video was released.

== Critical reception ==
Professional ratings
Review scores
Source	Rating
AbsolutePunk	8/10
Allmusic	3.5/5 stars
Alternative Press	4/5 stars
Big Cheese	5/5 stars
The Boston Globe	favorable
The Examiner	4/5 stars
IGN	8.5/10
Kerrang!	4/5 stars
Rock Sound	9/10
Sputnikmusic	3.5/5

Radiosurgery garnered positive reviews upon its release. At Metacritic, which assigns a normalized rating out of 100 to reviews from mainstream music critics, the album received an average score of 70, based on 9 reviews, which indicates "generally favorable reviews". Critics' praise was often centered on the album's nostalgic sound and its catchy hooks, while Bethany Cosentino's guest appearance on track "Caught in the Act" was also widely applauded. Indeed, Annie Zaleski of Alternative Press called Radiosurgery "focused and precise" while awarding four stars out of five in her review. She noted that the album is rich on "summary riffs and brisk tempos", before summarising, "by refusing to settle for "good enough" – and by creating a homage to youthful, timeless pop punk – New Found Glory sound revitalised and relevant." AbsolutePunk staff writer Thomas Nassiff described the album as containing "beautiful pop-punk jammers" while awarding a score of 8 out of 10. Though pointing out that the album offers nothing new to the band's catalog, he reflected "New Found Glory has too many good records to call this one their best, but that doesn't really matter in the end. Comparing Radiosurgery to Sticks and Stones, New Found Glory or even Catalyst or Not Without a Fight is simply irrelevant. It's better to concentrate on what's in front of us: a hard-hitting, purely enjoyable album from South Florida's proudest sons." David McLaughlin of Kerrang! magazine expressed that "Radiosurgery is pretty much everything anyone could want from a New Found Glory record." Awarding an "excellent" four K! rating, he noted the album's "nostalgic 90s sound" by adding, "Age-old tales about lovestruck boys and girls told in three minutes via three chords, killer choruses and golden melodies. The Ramones knew a thing or two about that. So do New Found Glory. These tried and tested musical staples still make for some really special moments." Tom Williams of Big Cheese magazine awarded the album five stars out of five in his review. He praised the band's "mashup of bleeding heart lyrics, catchy melodies and punk rock energy" before asserting, "Infectious as always, professionally delivered and with a sound purpose built for partying, the album is a hit plain and simple." Gregory Heaney of Allmusic awarded the album a favorable three and a half stars out of five in his review. He noted how "pop-punk is becoming a lost art, a rarefied ability to sugarcoat heartache rather than embellish it, and that's exactly what New Found Glory do on this album. Without falling back on breakdowns, half-time choruses, or screaming, the band delivers 11 tracks of upbeat rock ruminations on unrequited love and heartbreak."

The Boston Globe writer Scott McLennan called the band "relentless" in his favorable review. He went on to explain that, "New Found Glory flaunts the chemistry brewed over the 14 years that these five Floridians have been together. Guitarists Chad Gilbert and Steve Klein maneuver speedy melodies around singer Jordan Pundik's tales of love and loss, while drummer Cyrus Bolooki and bassist Ian Grushka propel the band. New Found Glory is at its best when sounding highly caffeinated, even if breakneck tempos belie a song's blue mood." Vanessa Spates of daily newspaper The Lantern awarded Radiosurgery an "A" grade in her review. She wrote that "Seven studio albums is an impressive feat for a punk rock band in a post-rock era. They keep a youthful quality in the manic guitars and the fury of drums. The entire album is infectious and invokes a lot of heartbreak anthems that everyone can relate to." Roz Smith, writing for New Jersey tabloid The Aquarian Weekly, felt the album was undeniably "catchy", emphasizing its "choruses, upbeat guitar riffs, bass grooves and slamming drums." Nicole Villeneuve of Canadian magazine Exclaim! also offered a positive review and wrote how the album was full of "lively hooks and crisp songs in a taut pop-punk package." Chad Grischow of IGN scored the album at 8.5 out of 10 and called it a "vibrant, infinitely listenable treat." He went on to explain that, "Channeling the brand of freewheeling, fun-loving pop-punk the quintet burst onto the scene playing years ago, the lean, in-your-face set of tracks examining a crumbled relationship hits hard." Rock Sound journalist Terry Bezer explained how there "isn't a wasted minute on Radiosurgey", whilst awarding a near perfect 9 out of 10 score. He noted how the album "will delight pop-punk purists and NFG faithful alike", before praising the songwriting as some of the band's most infectious to-date. Steve M, staff writer for Sputnikmusic awarded Radiosurgery a "great" 3.5 out of 5 score. He felt the album contained "all the little quirks of their earlier material," before adding, "it is difficult not to get caught up in Radiosurgery for what it is: a short and sweet pop-punk album designed to get you out of your chair and moving." Consequence of Sound writer Kevin Barber awarded the album three stars out of five in his review. He wrote that, "On Radiosurgery, New Found Glory have found their older, faster, and stronger sound, dishing out anthemic choruses, while still holding on to their "new found" maturity." Jason Heller of The A.V. Club was less receptive, awarding the album a "C" grade and bemoaning the bands, "same bouncy/bittersweet dynamic. It's also stuck religiously to its chunky, melodic sound. But where 2009's Not Without A Fight had a hint of a bite, Radiosurgery shows all the signs of tooth decay."

=== Accolades ===
The album was well regarded by various music publications, seeing it feature in several year-end lists for 2011. Joe DeAndrea, critic for AbsolutePunk, placed "Anthem for the Unwanted" at number two within his "Top 15 Songs of the Year" list. Meanwhile, the album was also placed at number nine on the websites' staff compiled "Best Albums of 2011" list. During his review of the album, Chad Grischow of IGN offered praise to the band's songwriting and awarded Radiosurgery the "Editors Choice Award". PopMatters journalist Kiel Hauck, compiling an article on the best music of 2011, placed Radiosurgery at number seven in the "Pop-Punk" category. In a year in which he felt the genre was reignited, he described the album as "fast paced and full of energy", before asserting that the album had helped put the band "back on the musical map." UK based magazine Big Cheese placed the album at number fifteen on their "50 Finest of 2011" feature. Jim Sharples noted how the album was "the sound of summer in CD form" and praised its hooks and melodies. In the "K! Critics' Top 101 Albums of the Year", Kerrang! writer Nick Ruskell ranked Radiosurgery at number nineteen. He wrote that, "packed with power chord punch and more bounce to the ounce than all the young pretenders combined, it was a defiant statement that the originals were back and better than ever." Andrew Kelham of Rock Sound ranked the album as the 26th best of the year in his article. He praised Radiosurgery's "timeless 90's aesthetic", which he felt made the record "endlessly enjoyable." Rob Watson-Lang, co-editor for music webzine Ourzone, ranked Radiosurgery as the tenth best record of the year and described it as some of the best material the band had written in some time.

Publication	Country	Nominated work	Accolade	Year	Rank
AbsolutePunk	United States	"Anthem for the Unwanted"	Top 15 Songs of the Year	2011	2
AbsolutePunk	United States	Radiosurgery	AP.net Staff List: Favorite Albums of 2011	2011	9
IGN	United States	Radiosurgery	Editors' Choice Award	2011	N/A
PopMatters	United States	Radiosurgery	The Best Pop-Punk of 2011	2011	7
Big Cheese	United Kingdom	Radiosurgery	50 Finest of 2011	2011	15
Kerrang!	United Kingdom	Radiosurgery	The K! Critics' Top 101 Albums of the Year	2011	19
Rock Sound	United Kingdom	Radiosurgery	Top Fifty Albums of the Year	2011	26
Ourzone	United Kingdom	Radiosurgery	Albums of the Year	2011	10

== Commercial performance ==
Upon its earlier release date of September 30 in Australia, Radiosurgery debuted on the ARIA Charts at number 50, and at number 44 on the Digital Albums Chart. According to building album sales data compiled by Hits Daily Double, the album was projected to have sold some 10,555 copies during its opening week sales in the United States, allowing it to enter the Billboard 200 at number thirty five. The album eventually charted at a higher position of twenty six, whilst also topping the Hard Rock Albums chart. Radiosurgery also reached number four on the Top Independent Albums chart, as well as entering the Alternative Albums and the Tastemaker Albums charts at number nine and seven respectively. The Tastemaker chart is not decided by record sales, but compiled by ranking new albums based on "an influential panel of indie stores and small regional chains." Overall, this marked a drop in performance compared to its predecessor Not Without a Fight (2009), which debuted at number twelve on the Billboard 200. It was also the band's first album since their self-titled second album (2000), that failed to enter the top twenty of the Billboard chart. The album was however released in a competitive week, with albums by Feist, Rodney Atkins, and Jack's Mannequin also debuting. It was also revealed that the weekly sales figures of 5.13 million units, was down 8% compared to the sum of the previous week.

== Track listing ==
All songs written and composed by New Found Glory.

No.	Title	Length
1.	"Radiosurgery"	2:54
2.	"Anthem for the Unwanted"	3:12
3.	"Drill It in My Brain"	3:08
4.	"I'm Not the One"	3:21
5.	"Ready, Aim, Fire!"	3:04
6.	"Dumped"	3:05
7.	"Summer Fling, Don't Mean a Thing"	2:57
8.	"Caught in the Act" (featuring Bethany Cosentino)	2:59
9.	"Memories and Battle Scars"	2:39
10.	"Trainwreck"	2:58
11.	"Map of Your Body"	3:28
Total length:		33:45

Deluxe edition
No.	Title	Length
12.	"Separate Beds"	2:31
13.	"Over Again"	2:33
14.	"Sadness"	3:09
15.	"Blitzkrieg Bop" (Ramones cover)	2:03
Total length:		44:01

== Personnel ==
The following personnel contributed to Radiosurgery, as adapted from the album liner notes.

New Found Glory

- Jordan Pundik – vocals
- Chad Gilbert – guitar
- Steve Klein – guitar
- Ian Grushka – bass
- Cyrus Bolooki – drums, percussion

Additional musicians

- Bethany Cosentino – vocals on "Caught in the Act"

Production

- Neal Avron – producer, recording, mixing
- Erich Talaba – engineering
- Ted Jensen – mastering
- Myriam Santos – photography
- Kyle Crawford – art direction, layout

== Chart positions ==
Chart (2011)	Peak position
Australian Albums Chart (ARIA)	50
Australian Digital Chart (ARIA)	44
Japanese Top Album Sales (Billboard Japan)	65
UK Albums Chart	142
US Billboard 200	26
US Alternative Albums (Billboard)	8
US Hard Rock Albums (Billboard)	1
US Independent Albums (Billboard)	4
US Tastemaker Albums (Billboard)	7

== Release history ==
Region	Date	Label	Format	Catalogue #
Australia	September 30, 2011	Epitaph Records	Double CD	E871782
Europe	October 3, 2011	Epitaph Records	Compact disc, double CD, vinyl LP, digital download	87145
United Kingdom	October 3, 2011	Epitaph Records	Compact disc, double CD, vinyl LP, digital download	271451; 271452
North America	October 4, 2011	Epitaph Records	Compact disc, double CD, vinyl LP, digital download	87145; 87178
Japan	October 5, 2011	Epitaph Records	Compact disc, double CD	NEOIMP-3531; NEOIMP-3532
