= Radiosurgery (song) =

Single by New Found Glory

from the album Radiosurgery
- Released: August 2, 2011
- Recorded: 2011 at The Casita, Los Angeles
- Genre: Pop punk
- Length: 2:55
- Label: Epitaph / 6131 Records
- Songwriter(s): New Found Glory
- Producer(s): Neal Avron

New Found Glory singles chronology
"Kiss Me" (2007)	"Radiosurgery" (2011)	"Connect the Dots" (2013)

"Radiosurgery" is a song by American rock band New Found Glory, serving as the lead single and title track for their seventh studio album Radiosurgery (2011). Its name is taken from the actual medical procedure radiosurgery, being used as a metaphor after one band member suffered a marriage break up. The single was released on August 2, 2011 as a digital download, while the music video premiered on September 14, 2011. The single was also available on limited edition 7" Vinyl.

== Background ==
The band's primary composer Chad Gilbert has explained that the title is a direct reference to the medical procedure radiosurgery, where a patient is treated by x rays or gamma rays to remove a tumor or growth from the brain. Gilbert used the analogy that if it was possible, the same procedure could be used to remove memories from the brain, noting that after a severe break up, a person can be left "going crazy." He revealed that since the band last wrote new material in 2008 (for Not Without a Fight), one member suffered a "very, very severe" separation. Though he refused to reveal who, he added, "It’s for them to talk about, not me. Someone pretty much lost their mind [and] did a lot of things that were pretty scary for all of us. We’ve all been through that. I wrote about it on our website, certain things sort of haunt you in your life. That’s where the title [Radiosurgery] comes from, it’s like a brain surgery." In the band's live album announcement on UStream, the guitarist also suggested that fans could interpret the title as a double entendre, noting when a person is trying to deal with a tough situation, "you can put on a record and it helps you." In the same video, primary lyricist Steve Klein can be heard joking that "you're gonna need radiosurgery to get these songs out of your head!"

== Music ==
"Radiosurgery"
Sample of "Radiosurgery", the title track from the album, which contains guitar riffs compared to Green Day's earlier work.

Prior to the recording of Radiosurgery, the band spent time revisiting music from their youth that first inspired them to be in a band. Chad Gilbert described how he spent six months "only listening to the Ramones, old Lookout! Records stuff, Green Day's Dookie, Descendents, Rancid's Let's Go and that's pretty much it." Gilbert had a direct musical vision for the album, similar to how he describes that Coming Home (2006) had, as opposed to Not Without a Fight (2009), where the attitude was simply "let's record a New Found Glory album." The band strove to "apply the throwback vibe to their always-evolving style," by incorporating the elements from those classic albums; "it was simple, it was fun, it was heartfelt, but it also kind of had an attitude," with the hallmarks of their own career. Gilbert described how he wanted to "bridge the gap between generations", hoping for reactions such as "Dude that’s totally Ramones, but it’s not the Ramones, it’s New Found Glory. Or like, Dude, that totally reminds me of when I heard Dookie for the first time, but it’s totally not, it’s New Found Glory." As such, the band were meticulous in the writing process, discarding anything that was not in line with the album's vision or songs that felt "safe". The line "it makes my brain hurt" from the single, was taken from the Screeching Weasel song "My Brain Hurts".

== Reception ==
Early reactions to the single were favorable, seeing it compared to Green Day's earlier material. MTV called it a "perfect pop punk song", with blogger Jenna Hally Rubenstein adding "After a quick listen, it sounds like New Found Glory's still got it. In fact, they don't sound a day over three albums old!" James Shotwell of music webzine Under the Gun Review opined how the song sounded like "Green Day circa 1995," while Jose Flores of the New Times Broward-Palm Beach stated that, "NFG never lost sight of its hardcore roots -- even though their newest jam, "Radiosurgery," sounds more like classic Green Day than Earth Crisis. The band focuses sharply on rocking, and working their way into your head."

== Release ==
"Radiosurgery" was released internationally as a digital download on 2 August 2011. It was later announced that the single would also be released as 7" Vinyl on both Epitaph and 6131 Records. Both releases would be limited to 500 copies and both contained the exclusive b-side "Giving Up on Me". The song impacted radio on September 27, 2011.

== Music video ==
New Found Glory perform during the music video, which paid homage to the Ramones video for "I Wanna Be Sedated"

It was announced on 11 August that the band would be shooting a music video for the single. The band sent out a casting call to fans to appear as extras on the shoot. The video was directed by Meiert Avis, and shot at the Linda Vista Hospital in Los Angeles. The video is set in a hotel, and has been described as a direct homage to the Ramones video for their 1981 single "I Wanna Be Sedated." The video begins with New Found Glory sitting on a bed in an empty hotel hallway, before a slew of characters emerge in the background. To create this chaotic party scene, a mixture of fans and close friends of the band were called in and assigned random costumes. The director gave several actions for each extra to perform and after each take, people were able to get "more and more into character". Over 100 extras were used during the shoot, portraying characters such as fire breathers, cheerleaders, and convicted felons amongst others. There are also several parodies of celebrities, including those of Lady Gaga, Bill Clinton, and Barack Obama parading around in the background. Tom Denney, former A Day To Remember guitarist, also appears in the video.

== Track listing ==
All songs written and composed by New Found Glory.

Digital
No.	Title	Length
1.	"Radiosurgery"	2:55

7" Vinyl
No.	Title	Length
1.	"Radiosurgery"	2:55
2.	"Giving Up on Me"	2:47

== Release history ==
Country	Date	Format
United States	August 2, 2011	Digital download
Worldwide	October 4, 2011	7" Vinyl
