= Makes Me Sick =

Studio album by New Found Glory
- Released: April 28, 2017
- Recorded: October 2016
- Genres: Pop-punk; alternative rock
- Length: 34:03
- Label: Hopeless
- Producer: Aaron Sprinkle

New Found Glory chronology
Resurrection (2014)	Makes Me Sick (2017)	From the Screen to Your Stereo 3 (2019)

Singles from Makes Me Sick
- 1. "Happy Being Miserable" Released: February 16, 2017; 2. "Party on Apocalypse" Released: April 24, 2017; 3. "The Sound of Two Voices" Released: September 7, 2017

Makes Me Sick is the ninth studio album by American rock band New Found Glory. It was released on April 28, 2017, through Hopeless Records.

== Background ==
In October 2016, Alternative Press reported that the group were working on a new album.

== Release ==
The band sent out cryptic messages teasing the album and on January 25, 2017, Makes Me Sick was announced for release in April. The lead single, "Happy Being Miserable", was released on February 16. The music video, filmed in January, was directed by Max Moore and is a recreation of a famous scene from the film Stand by Me. Between March and May, the group went on an anniversary tour to celebrate 20 years of being a band. On the tour, the group performed material from their 1999–2009 albums, as well as "Happy Being Miserable". Gilbert said tour would be "making people aware" of their new album and that for their "future tours we will jam more" songs from the album. On April 14, "Party on Apocalypse" was made available for streaming. A music video was released for it, directed by Moore.Makes Me Sick was released on April 28 through Hopeless Records. In September, the band performed at Riot Fest.

On September 7, a music video was released for "The Sound of Two Voices", directed by Moore. On December 1, a music video was released for "20 Years from Now", an outtake from the Makes Me Sick sessions. The clip consisted of footage from the previous 20 years of the group's existence. Additionally, the track was also released as a single. In May and June, the band embarked on the Sick Tour in the US, with support from Bayside, the Movielife and former Yellowcard frontman William Ryan Key. On May 17, a music video was released for "Call Me Anti-Social", directed by Moore. The album was re-released as a deluxe edition, Makes Me Sick Again, on May 18, 2018. On June 11, a music video was released for "Heaven Sent", directed by Paris Visone. Later in the month, the band headlined their own festival, BreakFest. In early August, the band performed on the 2018 Warped Tour. On August 15, a music video was released for "Barbed Wire", directed by Visone.

== Critical reception ==
Professional ratings
Aggregate scores
Source	Rating
Metacritic	67/100
Review scores
Source	Rating
AllMusic	3.5/5 stars
Alternative Press	3.5/5 stars
Exclaim!	7/10
Rock Sound	6/10

Makes Me Sick received mostly positive reviews from music critics. At Metacritic, which assigns a normalized rating out of 100 to reviews from mainstream critics, the album has an average score of 67 based on 5 reviews, indicating "generally favorable reviews". Neil Z. Yeung of AllMusic stated that the album is for "diehards who have grown with the band over the decades, this softer and more buoyant sound should be a welcome maturation."

== Track listing ==
All tracks are written by New Found Glory

No.	Title	Length
1.	"Your Jokes Aren't Funny"	3:08
2.	"Party on Apocalypse"	3:23
3.	"Call Me Anti-Social"	3:28
4.	"Happy Being Miserable"	3:00
5.	"The Sound of Two Voices"	2:58
6.	"Blurred Vision"	3:40
7.	"Say It Don't Spray It"	3:27
8.	"Barbed Wire"	3:47
9.	"Short and Sweet"	3:29
10.	"The Cheapest Thrill"	3:43
Total length:		34:03

Makes Me Sick Again
No.	Title	Length
1.	"Heaven Sent"	3:23
2.	"Your Jokes Aren't Funny"	3:08
3.	"Party on Apocalypse"	3:23
4.	"Call Me Anti-Social"	3:28
5.	"Happy Being Miserable"	3:00
6.	"The Sound of Two Voices"	2:58
7.	"Vacation Day"	3:06
8.	"Blurred Vision"	3:40
9.	"Say It Don't Spray It"	3:27
10.	"Barbed Wire"	3:47
11.	"Short and Sweet"	3:29
12.	"The Cheapest Thrill"	3:43
13.	"20 Years From Now"	3:32
Total length:		44:04

== Personnel ==
Credits adapted from AllMusic.

New Found Glory

- Jordan Pundik – lead vocals
- Chad Gilbert – guitars, backing vocals
- Ian Grushka – bass guitar
- Cyrus Bolooki – drums, percussion

Technical

- David Bean – photography
- Brian Butler – artwork/layout
- Troy Glessner – mastering
- Tom Lord-Alge – mixing
- Aaron Mlasko – drum technician
- Aaron Sprinkle – engineer, producer
- Lee Unfried – drum engineering

== Charts ==
Chart performance for Makes Me Sick
Chart (2017)	Peak position
Australian Albums (ARIA)	36
Japanese Top Album Sales (Billboard Japan)	93
Scottish Albums (Official Charts)	54
UK Albums (Official Charts)	55
UK Album Downloads (Official Charts)	44
UK Independent Albums (Official Charts)	8
UK Rock & Metal Albums (Official Charts)	2
US Billboard 200	40
US Independent Albums (Billboard)	1
US Top Rock Albums (Billboard)	7

Chart performance for Makes Me Sick Again
Chart (2018)	Peak position
US Independent Albums (Billboard)	31
