= A Very New Found Glory Christmas =

EP by New Found Glory
- Released: December 1, 2012
- Recorded: 2012
- Genre: Acoustic rock, christmas music, pop punk
- Length: 12:20
- Label: Self released
- Producer: New Found Glory

New Found Glory chronology
Radiosurgery (2011)	A Very New Found Glory Christmas (2012)	Mania (2013)

A Very New Found Glory Christmas is the third EP by American rock band New Found Glory. Self-produced by the band, it is a special edition Christmas-themed acoustic recording featuring two original songs and three covers. The EP was limited to 2,000 pressings and was released via cassette tape on December 1, 2012. 1,000 white copies were sold on tour, and 1,000 red copies were sold in their online store. The band released "Nothing for Christmas" via Rdio and Spotify on December 20, after debuting songs off the EP during the tenth anniversary tour of their Sticks and Stones album. The cover art is a parody of the 1990 blockbuster movie Home Alone.

== Track listing ==
No.	Title	Writer(s)	Length
1.	"Nothing for Christmas"	New Found Glory	3:38
2.	"Ex-Miss"	New Found Glory	3:39
3.	"White Christmas" (Bing Crosby cover)	Irving Berlin	1:33
4.	"The Christmas Song" (Nat King Cole cover)	Mel Tormé, Robert Wells	2:07
5.	"We Wish You A Merry Christmas"	Christmas Carol	1:23

== Personnel ==
New Found Glory

- Chad Gilbert – lead guitar, backing vocals, producer
- Jordan Pundik – lead vocals, producer
- Steve Klein – rhythm guitar, backing vocals, producer
- Ian Grushka - bass guitar, backing vocals
- Cyrus Bolooki - tambourine, drums, percussion, backing vocals
