= Linda Vista Community Hospital =

Defunct hospital in Los Angeles, California

- Santa Fe Coast Lines Hospital
- U.S. National Register of Historic Places
- Los Angeles Historic-Cultural Monument
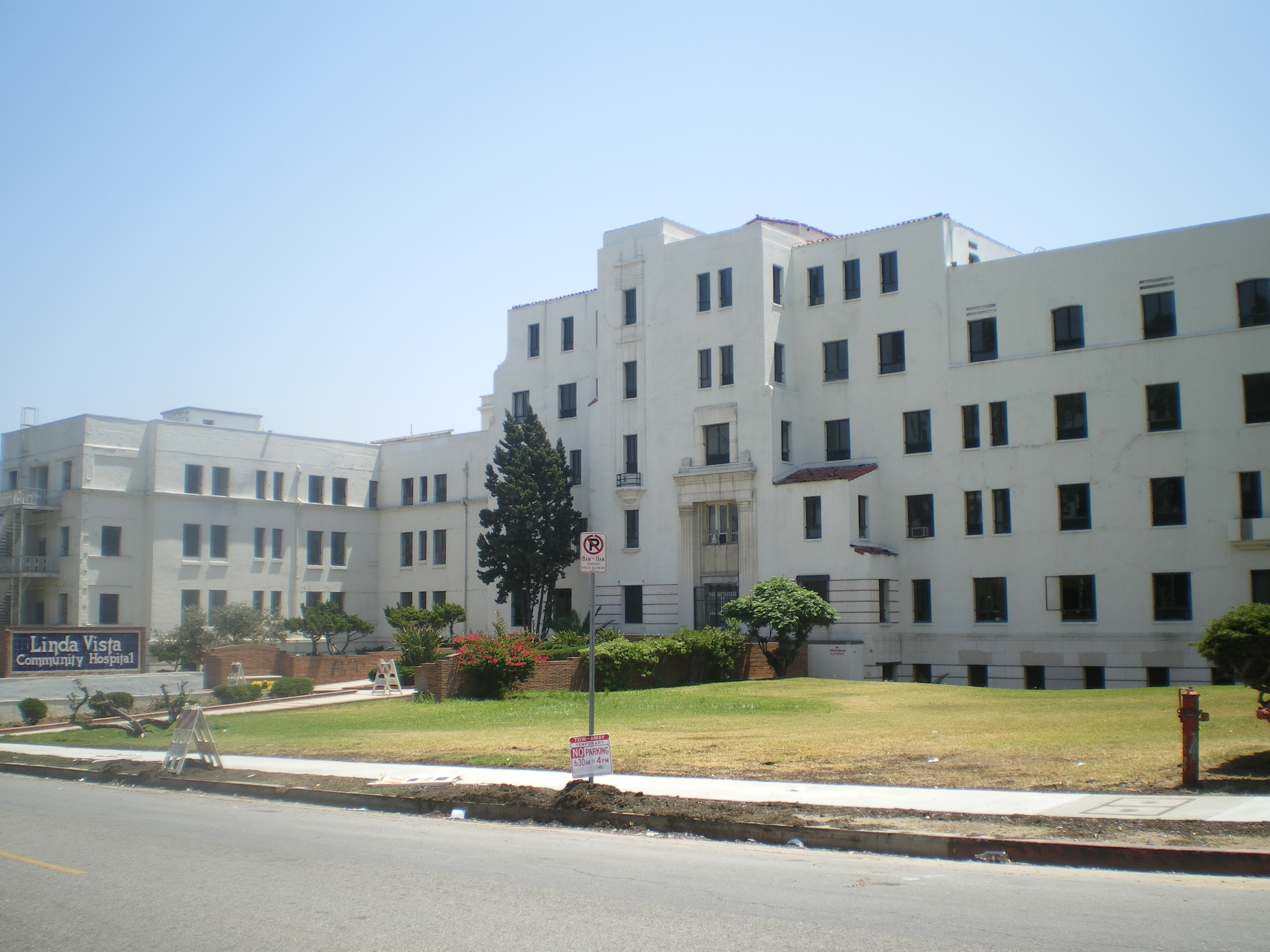
- Linda Vista Community Hospital in 2006

- Location within the Los Angeles metropolitan area Location within California Location within the United States
- Location: 610-30 St. Louis Street, Los Angeles, California
- Coordinates: 34°2′18″N 118°13′2″W
- Built: 1905 (rebuilt in 1938)
- Architects: Gilman, H.L.
- Architectural style: Mission/Spanish Revival
- NRHP reference No.: 05001499
- LAHCM No.: 713

Significant dates
- Added to NRHP: January 3, 2006
- Designated LAHCM: April 5, 2002

Linda Vista Community Hospital is a former hospital located at 610–30 South St. Louis Street in Los Angeles, California, United States, in the Boyle Heights neighborhood. The hospital was originally constructed for employees of the Santa Fe Railroad and called the Santa Fe Coast Lines Hospital. It was one of four employee hospitals run by the railroad Santa Fe Employees Hospital Association.

The hospital closed in 1991. After its closure, the hospital became a popular filming location for productions, including films, TV shows, and music videos. It has also become the subject of several paranormal investigations. The hospital was sold in 2011 and converted into a low income senior living facility called Hollenbeck Terrace in 2015.

== History ==
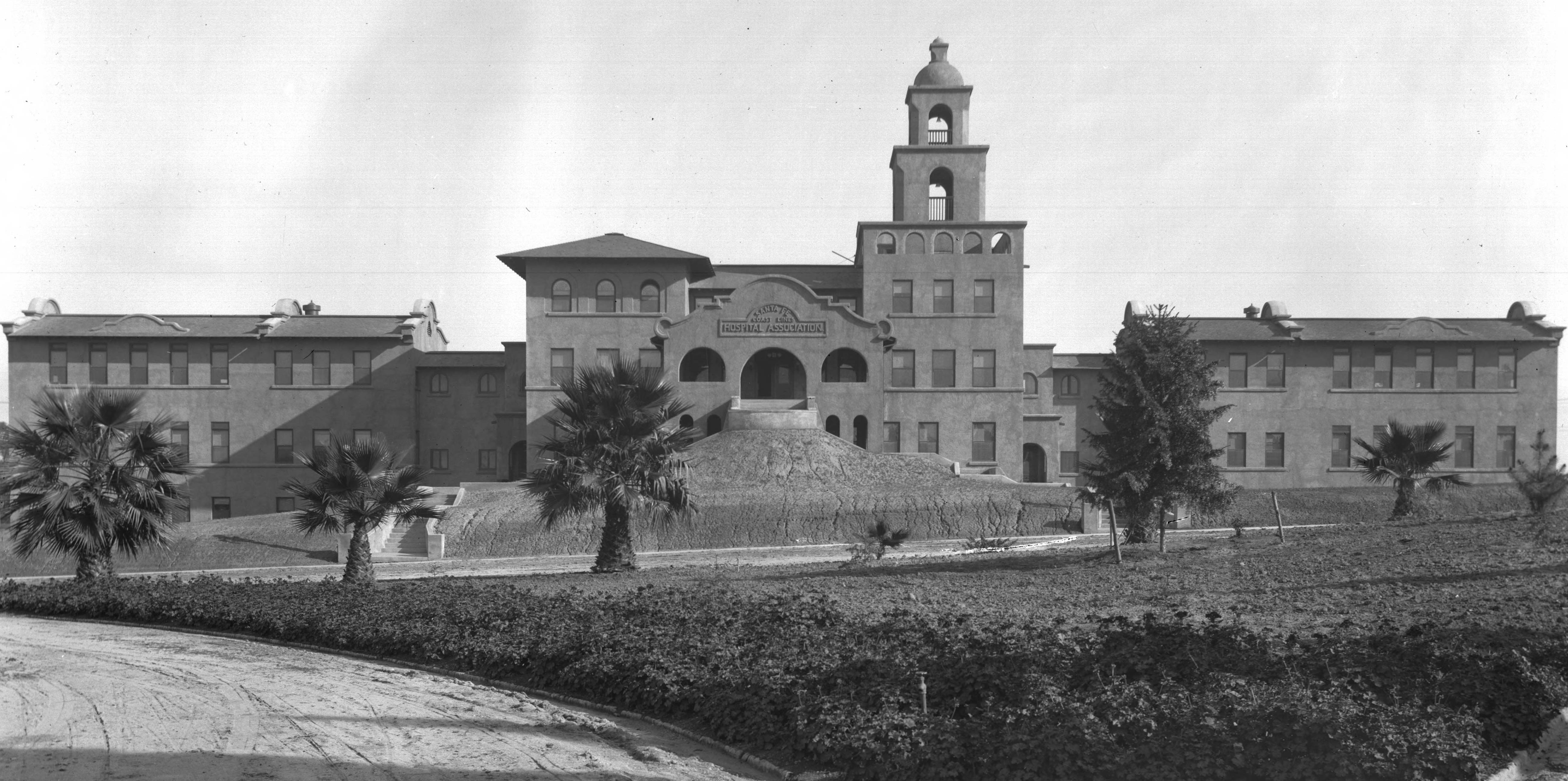
Exterior view of hospital, c. 1905

The original building that housed the hospital opened in the fall of 1905 to serve employees of the Santa Fe Railroad. It had its own Jersey cows, chickens, and a garden to provide patients with the freshest milk, butter, eggs, poultry and vegetables. This original Moorish-style hospital building was designed by Charles Whittlesey and known as the Santa Fe Coast Lines Hospital. The hospital was so successful that it began expanding and the location, overlooking Hollenbeck Park was transformed into a campus.

The original 1905 building was replaced in 1938 with the current Mission Revival Style structure, designed by architect H.L. Gilman. In 1985 it became the Linda Vista Community Hospital.

=== Decline and closure ===
By the late 1970s, the railroad hospital association facilities were experiencing declining use, as more railroad workers began to use conventional medical-insurance policies. The area surrounding the hospital also became a less-affluent area, severely affecting the hospital financially. The Santa Fe Railroad sold the 150-bed hospital to American Healthcare Management in 1980. According to a California Health Law News report, Linda Vista was forced to reduce operational expenses in the form of limiting whole services and as a result saw much blame for mistreatment of patients and a noticeable decline in quality. As the hospital cut operational costs, more hospital staff and patients began transferring out to more affluent hospitals in the area as a result. During the 1970s and 1980s, the hospital spent most of the time treating victims of gang-related violence in the nearby area as crime had risen dramatically around Boyle Heights. Making matters worse for the hospital, a majority of the victims were either underinsured or uninsured, contributing to financial difficulties. Following public criticism noted in an Los Angeles Times article in 1988, system mismanagement eventually forced the hospital to close its emergency services department in 1989. The quality of care at Linda Vista Community Hospital continued to decline as doctors and nurses moved to other hospitals. In 1991, the hospital ceased operations.

=== Post-closure ===
In the decades following its closure, it was used primarily as a filming location. In January 2006, the hospital was placed on the National Register of Historic Places.

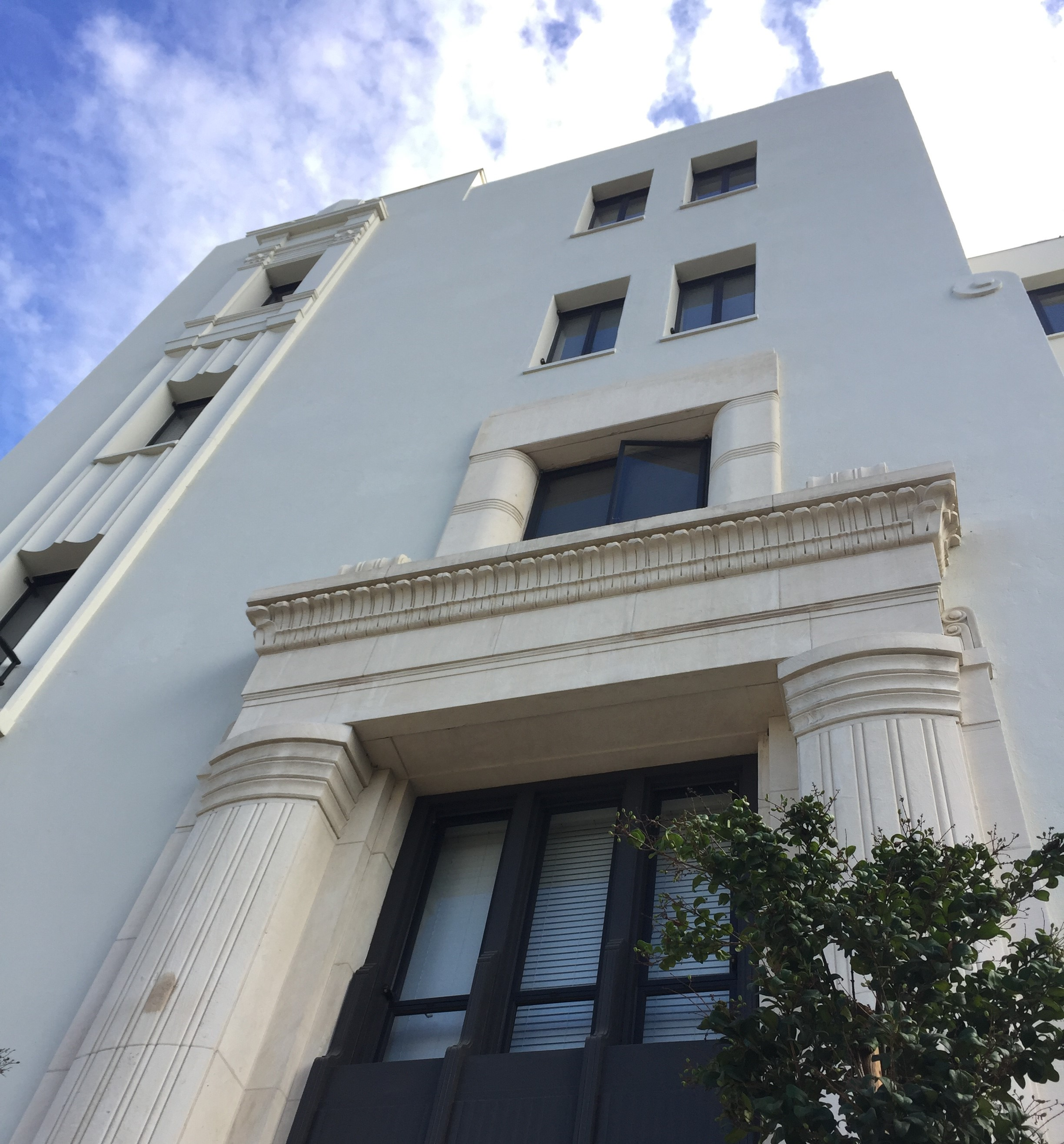
Linda Vista Hospital c. 2017 as Hollenbeck Terrace Senior Lofts

In 2011, the 4.2-acre Linda Vista Hospital complex was purchased by AMCAL Multi-Housing Inc. The building remains on the historic registry, the main hospital and former nurses dormitory, were renovated into Hollenbeck Terrace in 2015; and now the complex provides a total of 97 apartments for fixed-income seniors plus a medical facility.

== As a filming location ==
Notable works shot at Linda Vista include the following:

Films

- Born in East LA (1987)
- Addams Family Values (1993)
- Tammy and the T-Rex (1994)
- L.A. Confidential (1997)
- Conspiracy Theory (1997)
- The Cell (2000)
- The Perfect Nanny (2001)
- Boo (2005)
- The Longest Yard (2005)
- Boogeyman 2 (2007)
- Deadgirl (2008)
- Zombie Strippers (2008)
- Yesterday Was a Lie (2009)
- The Lords of Salem (2012)
- Insidious: Chapter 2 (2013)
- The Scribbler (2014)
- Insidious: Chapter 3 (2015)

Television programs

- Buffy the Vampire Slayer
- Charmed (season 1, episode 5: "Dream Sorcerer")
- True Blood (season 5) in the episode "Let's Boot and Rally"
- Criminal Minds (season 7) in the episode "Heathridge Manor"
- ER (season 1, pilot episode: "24 Hours").
- Ghost Adventures (season 2, episode 7: "Linda Vista Hospital" and season 6, episode 5: "Return to Linda Vista Hospital")
- Rob Dyrdek's Fantasy Factory (season 5, episode 10: "Dyrdek Day")
- Dexter (season 1, episodes 4 and 5: "Let's Give the Boy a Hand" and "Love American Style")
- Charm School with Ricki Lake (episode 5: "Fear Factors")
- Ghost Stories (season 2, episode 12: "Dr. Edwards")
- My Ghost Story (season 2, episode 1: "An Entity In Bed")
- Paranormal Challenge (episode 10: "Linda Vista Hospital")
- Face Off (season 2, episode 4: "Night Terrors")
- S Club 7: Christmas Special (one-off TV special)

Music videos

- The New Found Glory song "Radiosurgery"
- The Duran Duran song "Falling Down"
- The Nine Inch Nails song "Closer"
- The Avenged Sevenfold song "Nightmare"
- The Hollywood Undead song "We Are"
- The Paramore song "Monster"
- The Fall Out Boy songs "Just One Yesterday" and "Where Did The Party Go" for The Young Blood Chronicles
- The Brokencyde song "Still the King"
- The Girlicious song "Maniac"
- The Garbage song "Bleed Like Me"
- The Lumineers song "Ho Hey"
- The In This Moment song "Adrenalize"
- Alan Jackson's "I Don't Even Know Your Name" From 1995

== See also ==
- Los Angeles Historic-Cultural Monuments on the East and Northeast Sides
- National Register of Historic Places listings in Los Angeles
- Los Angeles General Medical Center
- St. Luke Medical Center
- Robert F. Kennedy Medical Center
- Lawang Sewu

== Sources ==
- "AMCAL California Bond Application request, #11-159"
- "Boyle Heights' haunted hospital to be turned into senior housing, Dec 22,2011"
- "Hopstep: Connecting Aged Care Candidates and Employers for Faster and Easier Recruitment"
- "Calif Health Law News – California's Vanishing Community Hospital: An Endangered Institution"
