= Connect the Dots (song) =

Single by New Found Glory

from the album Kill It Live
- Released: September 10, 2013
- Recorded: 2013 at Buzzbomb Sound Labs, Orange, California
- Genre: Pop punk, alternative rock
- Length: 3:11
- Label: Violently Happy/Bridge Nine
- Songwriter: New Found Glory
- Producers: Paul Miner, New Found Glory

New Found Glory singles chronology
"Radiosurgery" (2011)	"Connect the Dots" (2013)

"Connect the Dots" is a song by American rock band New Found Glory, serving as a limited edition single from their first live album Kill It Live (2013). The single was released on September 10 via Violently Happy Records, a partnership between independent label Bridge Nine Records and the bands guitarist Chad Gilbert.

The single was announced in August and later released as a digital download on September 10, before a 7" vinyl limited to just 1,000 pressings across three variants on September 17. The single features title track "Connect the Dots" (one of three new studio recordings specifically for Kill It Live), as well as live recordings of "Truck Stop Blues" and "Better Off Dead", which were not included in the final cut of the full album. The band had performed two sold-out dates at the Chain Reaction music venue in Anaheim, California between March 27–28, 2013.

== Track listing ==
Digital download
No.	Title	Length
1.	"Connect the Dots"	3:11
Total length:		3:11

7" vinyl
No.	Title	Length
1.	"Connect the Dots"	3:11
2.	"Better Off Dead (live)"	3:01
3.	"Truck Stop Blues (live)"	2:19
Total length:		8:31

== Personnel ==
The following personnel contributed to Connect the Dots, as adapted from the single liner notes.

New Found Glory

- Jordan Pundik — lead vocals
- Chad Gilbert — lead guitar, backing vocals
- Steve Klein — rhythm guitar
- Ian Grushka — bass guitar
- Cyrus Bolooki — drums, percussion

Production

- Paul Miner — producer, recording, engineering
- Kyle Black — mixing
- Mike Piacentini — mastering
- Kyle Crawford — art direction
- Chris Wrenn — design
- John Weiner — photography

== Release history ==
Region	Date	Label	Format	Catalogue #
Worldwide	September 10, 2013	Violently Happy/Bridge Nine	Digital download	B9R198/VHR005
Worldwide	September 17, 2013	Violently Happy/Bridge Nine	7" vinyl	B9R198/VHR005
