= Black Velvet (magazine) =

British rock magazine

Black Velvet is a quarterly independent rock magazine based in the UK. The zine was founded in 1994 and is published/edited by Shari Black Velvet. The zine includes in-depth interviews, concert reviews, album reviews and more. Sugarcult's Marko 72 also wrote a regular column for a while although now a different musician writes a column each issue. The zine changed from a printed mag to a free online mag in 2014.

Black Velvet primarily features rock and pop-punk bands. Bands/artists that have appeared on the cover of Black Velvet include Good Charlotte, My Chemical Romance, Sugarcult, Pitchshifter, Jon Bon Jovi, Less Than Jake, Yellowcard, The All-American Rejects, Madina Lake Papa Roach, Shinedown, Forever the Sickest Kids, Framing Hanley, AFI, The Used, Metro Station, Boys Like Girls, Goldfinger, City Sleeps, The Audition, Paramore, Bullets and Octane, Sugarcult, The Starting Line, Billy Talent, Simple Plan, Funeral For a Friend, Finch, Steriogram, Taking Back Sunday, Lostprophets, Midtown, Bush, Lit, Set It Off, Escape The Fate, Sixx:A.M., Lifehouse, Black Stone Cherry, Nothing More, Andy Black, Hardcore Superstar, and more.

== History ==
Black Velvet began as a photocopied black and white fanzine in 1994. Its first colour cover was of Nicky Wire (Manic Street Preachers) on issue 23. The zine added colour centre pages to mark its tenth anniversary and went full colour to celebrate reaching issue 50 in 2006. It was on sale in a number of independent record stores as well as Tower Records and some HMVs. Issue 80 saw Black Velvet convert to a free online pdf magazine. Every issue can now be read online for free. Black Velvet reached its 100th issue in March 2019.
