= Zero Tolerance (magazine) =

Extreme music magazine

- Editor: Lisa Macey
- Former editors: Calum Harvie, Lee du-Caine
- Categories: Music
- Frequency: Bimonthly
- Publisher: Lisa Macey
- First issue: August/September 2004
- Country: United Kingdom
- Based in: United Kingdom
- Language: English
- Website: ztmag.com

Zero Tolerance was an extreme music magazine, launched in September 2004 by Lisa Macey and Leon Macey and published by Obdurate Ltd. in the United Kingdom. Published bi-monthly, it can be found on newsstands in the UK, Europe and North America - and is available (with some delay) on newsstands in Australia and specialist retailers in New Zealand and Taiwan. The magazine features a covermount CD. The magazine's tagline is "Extreme Views on Extreme Music by Extreme People".

Lisa, formerly the editor and publisher of Terrorizer magazine, launched Zero Tolerance after she left Terrorizer in early 2004 due to differences with the magazine's new owner over its direction. Leon is a member of the experimental UK extreme metal band Mithras. Previous editors are Nathan T. Birk, Calum Harvie and Lee du-Caine.

Alongside interviews with bands, reviews, news and a metal crossword, industry features with visual artists, directors, music producers and the like have been regular in Zero Tolerance Magazine since its launch in 2004 and the magazine has been home to interviews with the likes of HR Giger, Dan Seagrave, John Carpenter and Andy Sneap.

Contributors, referred to as "The Panel", hail from the UK, Ireland, North America, continental Europe, and Australia. Notable regular contributors include Chris Kee, Alan Averill (also known as Nemtheanga of Primordial), John Norby, Olivier 'Zoltar' Badin, Jose Carlos Santos, Will Pinfold, Geoff Birchenall, Graham Matthews, John Mincemoyer, Paul Carter - who is also involved in the commercial side of the magazine - and more. Dan Lilker (ex-Brutal Truth, Nuclear Assault) was a contributor to the magazine in the 2000s. Alex S. Johnson wrote the "Shock Opera" horror music column for six issues and wrote several cover stories including Strapping Young Lad. His final contribution was "Blues For Lucifer," an interview with Electric Wizard that appeared in Issue 082.

The magazine went on hiatus in late 2023 after issue 109. Some posts on Facebook said issue 110 was being worked on. An update followed in August 2024 which once again mentioned the issue was on the way but two years later there has not been another update made and no sign on issue 110. Comments were also switched off on the magazine's Facebook page after people asked for an update. The magazine is assumed closed though the website remains online but hasn't been updated since 2024.
