= Big Cheese (magazine) =

UK independent music magazine

- September 2010 Issue
- Editor: Jim Sharples
- Categories: Music
- Frequency: Bi -Monthly
- Circulation: 13,000
- Publisher: Big Cheese Publishing Ltd.
- First issue: 1996
- Final issue Number: February 2016; 179
- Country: United Kingdom
- Based in: London
- Language: English
- Website: http://www.bigcheesemagazine.com
- ISSN: 1365-358X

Big Cheese was an independent music magazine published in the United Kingdom that covers alternative music including rock, punk, and metal. It was circulated monthly.

== Features ==
Big Cheese was one of the first monthly UK magazines to feature the likes of My Chemical Romance, Brand New, Turbonegro, Panic! at the Disco, The Movie Live, Alexisonfire and Taking Back Sunday. Since its creation, Big Cheese has offered bespoke covermount incentives to its readers, such as giving away a strictly limited My Chemical Romance patch to celebrate the release of their latest album, giving Green Day fans exclusive free band-branded wristbands, as well as being one of the first magazines to offer a downloadable compilation CD to its readers completely free. The magazine published its last issue in February 2016.

== Personnel ==
=== Staff ===
The staff of the magazine include:

- Jim Sharples - "Features" editor
- Ian Chaddock - News/Online editor
- Paul Hagen - "Reviews" editor
