= List of post-rock bands =

This article provides a list of post-rock bands, in both the first wave and the second wave. The list is not exhaustive, but bands that have been added to this list are considered by their citations to be notable in the genre, having the term be applied to them in either the first wave or second wave definitions.

== List ==
=== 0–9 ===
- 12Twelve
- 65daysofstatic

=== A ===
- A Dog Called Ego
- Aerial M / Papa M
- The Album Leaf
- Aloha
- The American Analog Set
- The American Dollar
- Amiina
- Amp
- And So I Watch You from Afar
- Appliance
- Apse
- The Appleseed Cast
- Arc in Round
- As the Poets Affirm
- Aswekeepsearching
- Ativin

=== B ===
- Balmorhea
- Bardo Pond
- Bark Psychosis
- Battles
- Beaten by Them
- Because of Ghosts
- Bell Orchestre
- Beware of Safety
- The Big Sleep
- Billy Mahonie
- The Black Heart Rebellion
- Bob Tilton
- Bowery Electric
- Brise-Glace
- Broadcast
- Broken Social Scene
- Brutus
- Butterfly Child
- Butterfly Explosion

=== C ===
- Califone
- Caspian
- Činč
- City of the Sun
- Clogs
- Codes in the Clouds
- Collapse Under the Empire
- Collections of Colonies of Bees
- Couch
- Crescent
- Crippled Black Phoenix
- Crows in the Rain
- Cul de Sac

=== D ===
- The Dead C
- The Declining Winter
- Decoder Ring
- Delicate AWOL
- Destroyalldreamers
- Dianogah
- Dirty Three
- Disco Inferno
- Do Make Say Think
- Don Caballero
- Dreamend
- Drums & Tuba
- Duster

=== E ===
- The Edmund Fitzgerald
- Ef
- Efterklang
- Einar Stray Orchestra
- El Ten Eleven
- Electrelane
- Emeralds
- Envy
- Epic45
- Errors
- Esben and the Witch
- Esmerine
- Ester Drang
- Explosions in the Sky

=== F ===
- Faunts
- The Fierce and the Dead
- Fifths of Seven
- Fly Pan Am
- Flying Saucer Attack
- The For Carnation
- For a Minor Reflection
- Foxhole
- Fridge
- Friends of Dean Martinez
- From Monument to Masses
- Fuck Buttons
- Füxa

=== G ===
- Ganger
- Gastr del Sol
- Giardini di Mirò
- Gifts from Enola
- God
- God Is an Astronaut
- Godspeed You! Black Emperor
- Goonies Never Say Die
- Grails
- Gregor Samsa

=== H ===
- The Hair and Skin Trading Company
- Hammock
- Hangedup
- Have a Nice Life
- Her Name Is Calla
- High Dependency Unit
- HiM
- Hood
- Hope of the States
- Hrsta

=== I ===
- I Like Trains
- Ice
- If These Trees Could Talk
- Insides
- Isis
- Isotope 217

=== J ===
- Jakob
- Jambinai
- Jeniferever
- Jessamine
- Jesu
- Jónsi
- Joy Wants Eternity
- June of 44
- Junius

=== K ===
- Karate
- Kreidler
- Kauan

=== L ===
- Labradford
- Laika
- Landing
- Lanterna
- Lastelle
- Lateduster
- Laura
- Lazlo Hollyfeld
- The Life and Times
- Lights & Motion
- Lights Out Asia
- Logh
- Long Distance Calling
- Long Fin Killie
- Low Roar
- Lymbyc Systym

=== M ===
- M83
- Macha
- Magnog
- Magyar Posse
- Main
- Make Believe
- Maruja
- Maserati
- Maybeshewill
- Meanwhile, Back in Communist Russia...
- Menomena
- The Mercury Program
- A Minor Forest
- Mogwai
- Mono
- Roy Montgomery
- Moonlit Sailor
- Moonshake
- More Than Life
- Mouse on the Keys
- Movietone
- Moving Mountains
- Múm
- Mutemath
- My Education

=== N ===
- Natural Snow Buildings
- Nedry
- Nordic Giants
- A Northern Chorus

=== O ===
- .O.rang
- O'Brother
- Jim O'Rourke
- Oceansize
- Oh Hiroshima
- On! Air! Library!

=== P ===
- Parting Gift
- Paul Newman
- Pele
- Pelican
- Pell Mell
- Piano Magic
- Picastro
- Pit Er Pat
- Platon Karataev
- Port-Royal
- Pram
- Precious Fathers
- Sam Prekop
- Pretend
- Pullman
- PVT

=== R ===
- Rachel's
- Radian
- Radiohead
- Red Sparowes
- Redjetson
- The Redneck Manifesto
- Rex
- Riverbeds
- Rodan
- Rosetta
- Rothko
- Russian Circles

=== S ===
- Salvatore
- Saxon Shore
- Scorn
- The Sea and Cake
- Seam
- Seefeel
- Sennen
- Set Fire to Flames
- The Seven Mile Journey
- The Shadow Project
- Shalabi Effect
- Shipping News
- Shy, Low
- Sigur Rós
- The Six Parts Seven
- Skullflower
- Sleep Party People
- Sleeping People
- Sleepmakeswaves
- Slint
- Son Lux
- Sonna
- The Sonora Pine
- Southpacific
- Space Needle
- Special Others
- Sputniks Down
- Stafrænn Hákon
- Stars Like Fleas
- Stars of the Lid
- Stereolab
- Storm & Stress
- Swan Lake
- Swans
- Sweep the Leg Johnny

=== T ===
- Talk Talk
- Talons
- Tarentel
- Tarwater
- Thee Silver Mt. Zion Memorial Orchestra
- These New Puritans
- The Third Eye Foundation
- This Is a Process of a Still Life
- This Is Your Captain Speaking
- This Patch of Sky
- This Will Destroy You
- Three Trapped Tigers
- The Timeout Drawer
- To Rococo Rot
- Toe
- Torngat
- Tortoise
- Tracer AMC
- Trans Am
- Tricot
- Tristeza
- Turing Machine

=== U ===
- Ui
- Ulan Bator
- Under Byen
- Unwed Sailor
- U.S. Maple

=== V ===
- Valley of the Giants
- Vessels
- Vision Eternel

=== W ===
- Way Station (band)
- We Lost the Sea
- We Never Learned to Live
- We Stood Like Kings
- Windsor Airlift
- Windsor for the Derby
- Wires Under Tension
- The World Is a Beautiful Place & I Am No Longer Afraid to Die
- Worriedaboutsatan

=== X ===
- Xiu Xiu

=== Y ===
- Year of No Light
- Yndi Halda
- Youthmovies
- Yume Bitsu

== See also ==
- Post-metal
