= Doomina =

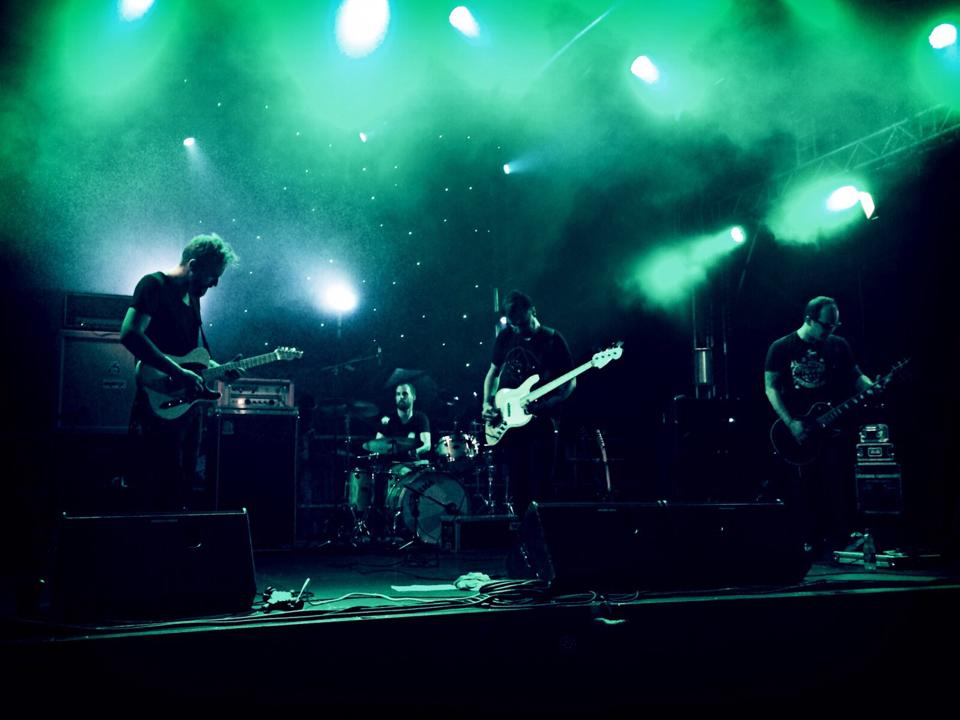
- Doomina live in Austria.

Background information
- Origin: Klagenfurt, Austria
- Genres: Post-rock
- Years active: 2006 - present
- Members: Daniel Gedermann (guitar); Christian Oberlercher (bass); Erich Kuttnig (drums); Lukas Geyer (guitar)
- Website: www.facebook.com/doominamusic

Doomina is an instrumental post-rock band from Klagenfurt, Austria, which was founded in 2006 by Daniel Gedermann (guitar) and started out as a doom metal band with stoner rock and sludge elements. Christian Oberlercher (bass) joined the group in 2007. The band's line-up changed over the years until Erich Kuttnig (drums) and Lukas Geyer (guitar) joined in 2012. Their debut album Elsewhere (2012), but even more so their second album Beauty (2013) can be categorized as post-rock. Doomina is characterized by complex arrangements of powerful and atmospheric instrumental music and elaborate songwriting. The band performed their self-titled album Doomina (2015) live at DUNK! (the biggest European post-rock festival) in Belgium in 2015 alongside Jakob, Caspian and Mono and received international acclaim. The band has also performed with bands like the Russian Circles, God Is An Astronaut, EF, Colour Haze or the Truckfighters. Their fourth studio album will be recorded at the beginning of 2017.

== Discography ==
Albums

- Elsewhere (2012)
- Beauty (2013)
- Doomina (2015)
