= Riverbed (disambiguation) =

Stream bed is the channel bottom of a stream or river or creek.

Riverbed may also refer to:

- Wadi, a dry riverbed that contains water only during times of heavy rain
- Riverbed Technology, an American technology company
- Riverbeds (band), a Canadian post-rock band
