= Way station (disambiguation) =

A waystation, or layover, is a break in scheduled travel.

Way station may also refer to:

- Way Station (band), a Ukrainian instrumental rock band
- Way Station (novel), a 1963 science fiction novel by Clifford D. Simak
- "The Way Station", chapter 2 of The Dark Tower I – The Gunslinger by Stephen King
- Waystation Studio, a private recording studio of Dave Way

== See also ==
- Mansio (Latin)
- Station (disambiguation)
- Stopover
- Whistle stop
- Weigh station
