= Joy Wants Eternity =

American post-rock band

Joy Wants Eternity is a five-piece post-rock band from Seattle. The band has drawn comparisons to Explosions in the Sky and Mogwai in album reviews with its melodic passages and equal parts ambience through heavily effected guitar. The Joy Wants Eternity song "You are the Vertical, You are the Horizon" was featured on radio talk show Sound Opinions. The band has played multiple shows with post-rock bands Caspian, Beware of Safety, and Seattle's own You.May.Die.In.The.Desert. The band's current label is XTAL Records. It can be surmised that the name of the band is a reference to the philosophical poem Zarathustra's roundelay of Friedrich Nietzsche's Thus Spoke Zarathustra (see Walter Kaufmann's translation).

== History ==
Formed in 2003, the original 15 piece lineup experimented with walls of sound and eventually pared down to a five-piece before its first show. The band's first release came in 2005 with a self-released EP, Must You Smash Your Ears Before You Learn to Listen with Your Eyes. After a 90.3 KEXP-FM live performance, the band went in the studio to record their full-length debut with the production assistant from the show, Andy Boyd. Released in May 2007 on local collective label Beep Repaired, the album You Who Pretend to Sleep received national attention with radio airplay and reviews. Japanese label XTAL Records picked up the band's release in 2008. After a US tour in 2008, the band began working on a new album, "The Fog Is Rising" which was released in May 2012. In 2015 Joy Wants Eternity wrote the score for the movie Mad Tiger, a documentary about Japanese punk band Peelander-Z.

== Members ==
- Salvador Huerta: Guitar
- Emory Liu: Drums, percussion
- Daniel Salo: Electric piano, bass, guitar
- Michael Sterling: Guitar
- Rob Thompson: Guitar, electric piano

== Discography ==
=== Albums ===
- You Who Pretend to Sleep (2007, Beep Repaired)
- You Who Pretend to Sleep + 2 bonus tracks (2008, XTAL)
- The Fog is Rising (2012)
- Mad Tiger (Original Motion Picture Soundtrack) (2015)

=== EPs ===
- Must You Smash Your Ears Before You Learn to Listen with Your Eyes EP (2005, self released)

== See also ==
- List of post-rock bands
