= I Like That =

I Like That may refer to:

- "I Like That" (Houston song), a 2004 song by Houston
- "I Like That" (Richard Vission and Static Revenger song), a 2009 song by Richard Vission
- "I Like That", a song by We Stood Like Kings from the album USA 1982 (2017), a new soundtrack for the movie Koyaanisqatsi.
- "I Like That", a song by Janelle Monáe from the album Dirty Computer.
