= Mourning Golden Morning =

Studio album by EF
- Released: April 1, 2010
- Genre: Post-Rock
- Length: 51:31
- Label: And The Sound Records
- Producer: Magnus Lindberg

EF chronology
I Am Responsible (2008)	Mourning Golden Morning (2010)	Delusions of Grandeur (2012)

Professional ratings
Review scores
Source	Rating
Sputnik Music	3.5/5 stars
Absolute Punk	8.1/10 stars

Mourning Golden Morning is the third studio album by Swedish post-rock band EF. It was released through And The Sound Records in the UK and in Sweden, and by Kapitän Platte in Germany.

== Track listing ==
No.	Title	Length
1.	"Escapade #1"	2:15
2.	"Sons of Ghosts"	8:43
3.	"K-141 KYPCK"	7:51
4.	"Longing for Colors"	9:01
5.	"Fyra"	4:30
6.	"401 Lwa"	6:48
7.	"Alp Lugens and Beyond"	12:31
