= Hiding Small Things in Obvious Places =

Album by Riverbeds

EP by Riverbeds
- Released: November 24, 2012
- Recorded: Soundwaves Studios (2011–2012)
- Genre: Indie rock, post-rock
- Length: 29:44
- Label: Self-released
- Producer: Riverbeds and Alex Perreault

Riverbeds chronology
Hiding Small Things in Obvious Places (2012)	What You Keep Close (2015)

Professional ratings
Review scores
Source	Rating
La Bible Urbaine	3.5/5 stars

Hiding Small Things in Obvious Places is the first studio EP by Canadian band Riverbeds, which was recorded over the course of few months in 2011 and 2012. It was produced by Riverbeds and Alex Perreault, owner of Soundwave Studios and released on CD and digital download on November 24, 2012. The album features "a midly dark and enticing combination of alternative riffs and post-hardcore elements, filled with magnetic instrumentals". The sound on this EP is much more refined than what fans are usually used to during live performances. It is considered an EP because it features only five songs, even though it runs for almost half an hour.

== Track listing ==
1. "Removing The Head" – 5:41
2. "Iron" – 5:28
3. "Cortex" – 5:59
4. "Years" – 5:36
5. "Dark" – 7:00

== Videos ==
- Removing The Head – (2011) (official video on YouTube)

== Personnel ==
=== Riverbeds ===
- Alexandre Duhamel Gingras – bass, backing vocals
- Charles-André Chamard – drums, vocals
- Fred Béland – guitar, backing vocals
- Vincent Pigeon – vocals, guitar, keyboard

=== Other ===
- Alex Perreault – producer
- François-Phillipe Pelletier – album design
- Mathieu Coudé – front cover
