= Give Me Beauty... Or Give Me Death! =

Studio album by EF
- Released: May 17, 2006
- Genre: Post-Rock
- Length: 52:03
- Label: And The Sound Records

EF chronology
Give Me Beauty... Or Give Me Death! (2006)	I Am Responsible (2008)

Professional ratings
Review scores
Source	Rating
Sputnik Music	3.5/5 stars
Punknews.org	4.5/5 stars

Give Me Beauty... Or Give Me Death! is the debut studio album by Swedish post-rock band EF. It was released through And The Sound Records in the UK and through Thomason Sounds in Japan. The UK pressing comes as a digipak while the Japanese version comes as a standard jewel case.

== Track listing ==
No.	Title	Length
1.	"Ett"	4:02
2.	"Hello Scotland"	12:19
3.	"Final Touch / Hidden Agenda"	11:15
4.	"He Came, He Stayed, He Fell"	3:59
5.	"Tomorrow My Friend..."	14:05
6.	"...We'll Meet in the End"	6:25

=== Bonus Tracks ===
Japanese Edition
No.	Title	Length
7.	"Misinform the Uninformed"	6:40
