= Felixstowe =

Port town in Suffolk, England

Coordinates: 51°57′50″N 1°21′05″E

- Town and civil parish
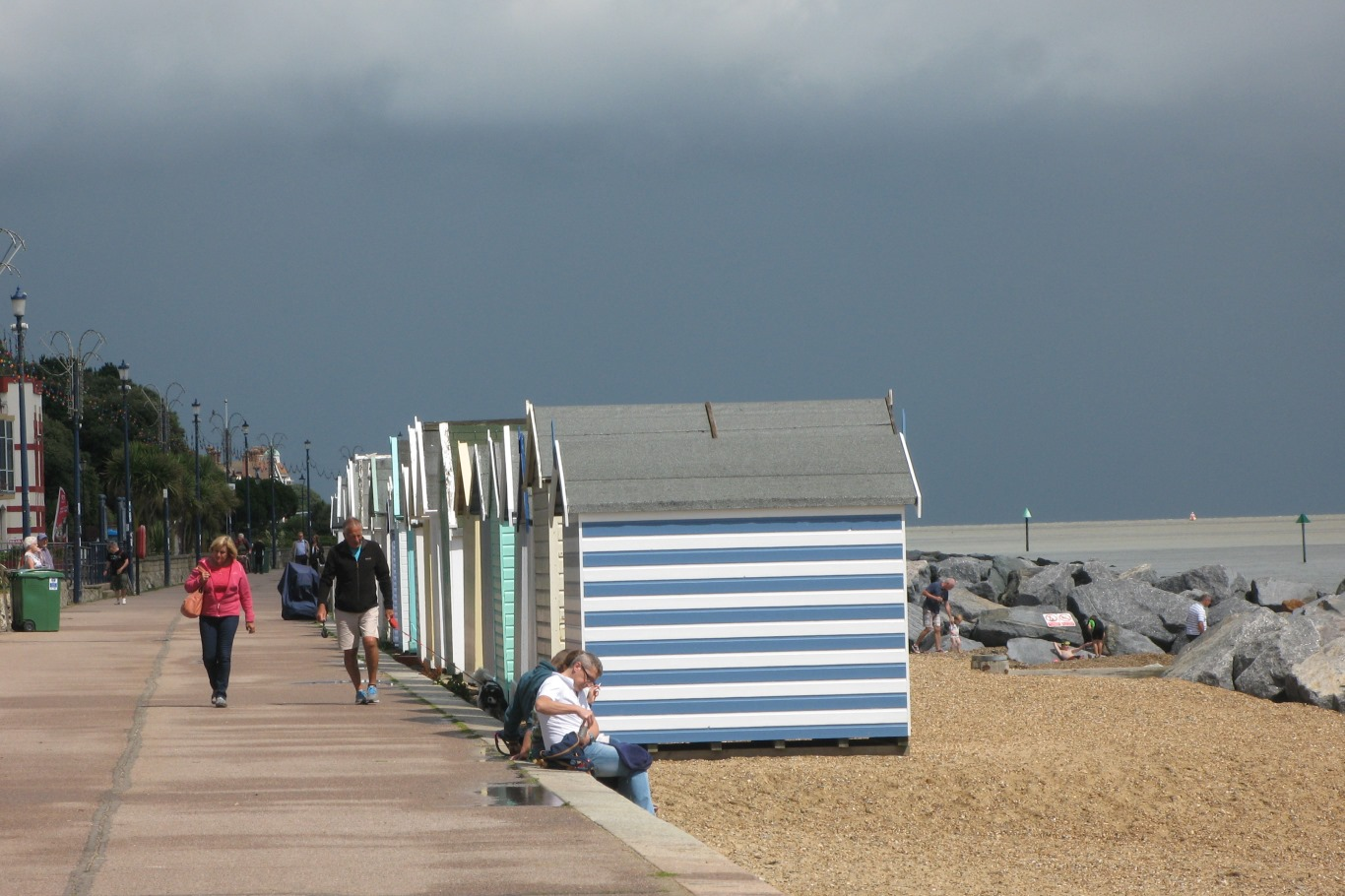
- Felixstowe beach

- Location within Suffolk
- Population: 24,521 (East Suffolk estimate, 2017)
- OS grid reference: TM306345
- Civil parish: Felixstowe
- District: East Suffolk
- Shire county: Suffolk
- Region: East
- Country: England
- Sovereign state: United Kingdom
- Post town: FELIXSTOWE
- Postcode district: IP11
- Dialling code: 01394
- Police: Suffolk
- Fire: Suffolk
- Ambulance: East of England
- UK Parliament: Suffolk Coastal

Felixstowe (/ˈfiːlɪkstoʊ/ FEE-lik-stoh) is a port town and civil parish in the East Suffolk District of Suffolk, England. The estimated population in 2017 was 24,521. The Port of Felixstowe is the largest container port in the United Kingdom. Felixstowe is approximately 72 miles (116 km) northeast of London.

== History ==
There are competing theories as to how the name of Felixstowe arose. One is that the town is named after Felix of Burgundy, a saint and the first bishop of the East Angles in the seventh century, although this is unlikely as the name Felixstowe is not recorded for almost 900 years. An alternative etymology is from the Anglo-Saxon or Old English name "Filicia" and "stōw", meaning a place of location. Literally Filicia's place. The earliest recorded names "Filchestou" from 1254, and "Filchestowe" in 1291 support this idea. It is possible that the later reworking of Filicia/Filche was made with the intention of referencing Felix of Burgundy.

The old Felixstowe hamlet was centred on a pub and church, having stood on the site since long before the Norman conquest of England. The early history of Felixstowe, including its Roman, Anglo-Saxon, Norman and medieval defences, is told under the name of Walton, because the name Felixstowe was given retrospectively, during the 13th century, to a place which had expanded to a form beyond the boundaries of Walton alone. In the Domesday Book, for instance, only Walton is shown, and not Felixstowe, which at the time held little more than a few houses scattered over the cliff tops. Walton was a settlement on the River Orwell and in 1844 had a population of 907 compared to the relatively small Felixstowe Parish holding only 502 people. Walton had always preceded Felixstowe as a settlement as seen by the presence of Walton Castle, built by the Romans in the 3rd century, but today Walton is generally considered part of Felixstowe due to modern expansion.

Felixstowe is situated at the tip of the Colneis peninsula, and was in the ancient Colneis Hundred of Suffolk.

The Felixstowe area as a whole provided a linchpin in England's defence, as proved in 1667 when Dutch soldiers landed near the Fludyers area and tried (unsuccessfully) in the Battle of Landguard Fort to capture Landguard Fort due to its strategic location. The town only became a major port in 1886 when the docks opened, following the initial construction of the dock basin in 1882.

In 1810 or 1811 seven Martello Towers were built along the shore, of which four survive. Tower P on Wireless Green, off Old Fort Road, is the home of the local CoastWatch group. Q Tower, in the town, was the HQ of the Harwich-Ipswich-Martlesham Heath anti-aircraft guns between 1941 and 1945, earlier it had been in Landguard Fort.

At the turn of the century, tourism increased, and a pier was constructed in 1905, some of which is partially functional to this day as an amusement arcade. Indeed, during the late Victorian period (after circa 1880) it became a fashionable resort, a trend initiated by the opening of Felixstowe Town railway station, the pier and a visit by the German imperial family in 1891.

It was in this buoyant period that Felixstowe was the first British town to adopt beach huts as stationary permanent structures (rather than wheeled bathing machines) and there are photographic records of beach huts at the "spa area" in Felixstowe dating back to 1895. It is therefore known as the home to British beach huts. Some of the beach huts in the spa area (a conservation area) date back to c.1900, so are probably the original beach huts. On the cliffs above this area sits Harvest House, which was built as The Felix Hotel in 1903, and was known as "the millionaire's hotel", because of the gentry and royal visitors it attracted. The Floral Hall was built in 1909, and subsequently became known as The Spa Pavilion. Felixstowe remained a fashionable seaside destination until the late 1930s.

In April 1914 as part of the suffragette bombing and arson campaign Bath Hotel, which was popular with elite visitors, was burnt down.

Felixstowe played an important role in both world wars; in the first as Royal Naval Air Service and RAF seaplane base RNAS Felixstowe, and in the second as the Coastal Forces MTB, MGB and ML base HMS Beehive. Between the wars the seaplane station housed the RAF experimental establishment which tested seaplanes and flying boats. Its sheds and piers were incorporated in the MTB base and later the container port.

On 11 August 1919, the Felixstowe Fury sideslipped and crashed into the sea 500 yards offshore soon after take-off while on a test flight. It was preparing for an 8,000-mile flight to Cape Town, South Africa. The wireless operator, Lt. MacLeod, was killed, and the six passengers were rescued. The wreckage was towed ashore.

Wallis Simpson stayed in Felixstowe in 1936 in order to claim residence for her divorce from Ernest Simpson so that she could marry Edward VIII. The divorce and marriage sparked the abdication crisis in the same year.

Most of the south-western area of Felixstowe Urban District, between the Dock, Landguard Point, and Manor Road, was occupied by the Navy, RAF and Army. with Landguard Fort and several ruined gun emplacements and bunkers a reminder of the 1939–1945 era.

It was the first base from which Second World War German E-boats and coastal convoys were systematically attacked—by flotilla led by Lt-Commanders Howes, Dickens, Hichens and Trelawney. Felixstowe was also HQ of the Harwich Harbour coast and anti-aircraft defences, and accommodated the RAF's 26th Marine Craft (Air-Sea Rescue) Unit. In 1944 the piers near the Dock were used to load troops, tanks and vehicles onto the British and American landing craft of "Force L", which reinforced the Normandy Invasion on its first and second days.

In 1945 the German naval commanders in Occupied Holland arrived in E-boats at Felixstowe Dock to surrender their boats and charts to the Royal Navy.

In 1953, at least 48 people died in the town during the North Sea flood.

In 1993 'Fast Eddie Maher', a security van driver, stole £1.2m cash from outside Lloyds bank. He went on the run and was eventually arrested in 2012.

=== Landguard Fort ===
Landguard Fort, originally known as Langer Fort, is on the site of the last opposed invasion of England in 1667, and the first land battle of the Duke of York and of Albany's (later James II & VII) Marines. The current fort was built in the 18th century, and modified in the 19th century with substantial additional 19th/20th century outside batteries. The Fort hosts regular military re-enactments, including Darell's Day, which is a celebration of the last invasion, children's events and open-air theatre.

In the two world wars the Fort was variously the HQ of the Harwich Harbour coast and anti-aircraft defences, the signal/control station for the harbour entrance, and a radio and radar station.

Landguard Fort is in the care of English Heritage, and is managed by the Landguard Fort Trust to make it accessible to the public.

=== Museum ===
A museum telling the story of Felixstowe, with a reference library, historic maps, photo archive and fourteen rooms of artefacts from Roman finds, the Martello towers, military social and domestic history through two world wars and into the new millennium is managed by volunteers from the Felixstowe History and Museum Society. It is located in the old submarine mining establishment building at the Landguard Peninsula, between the Fort and Port.

=== Pier ===
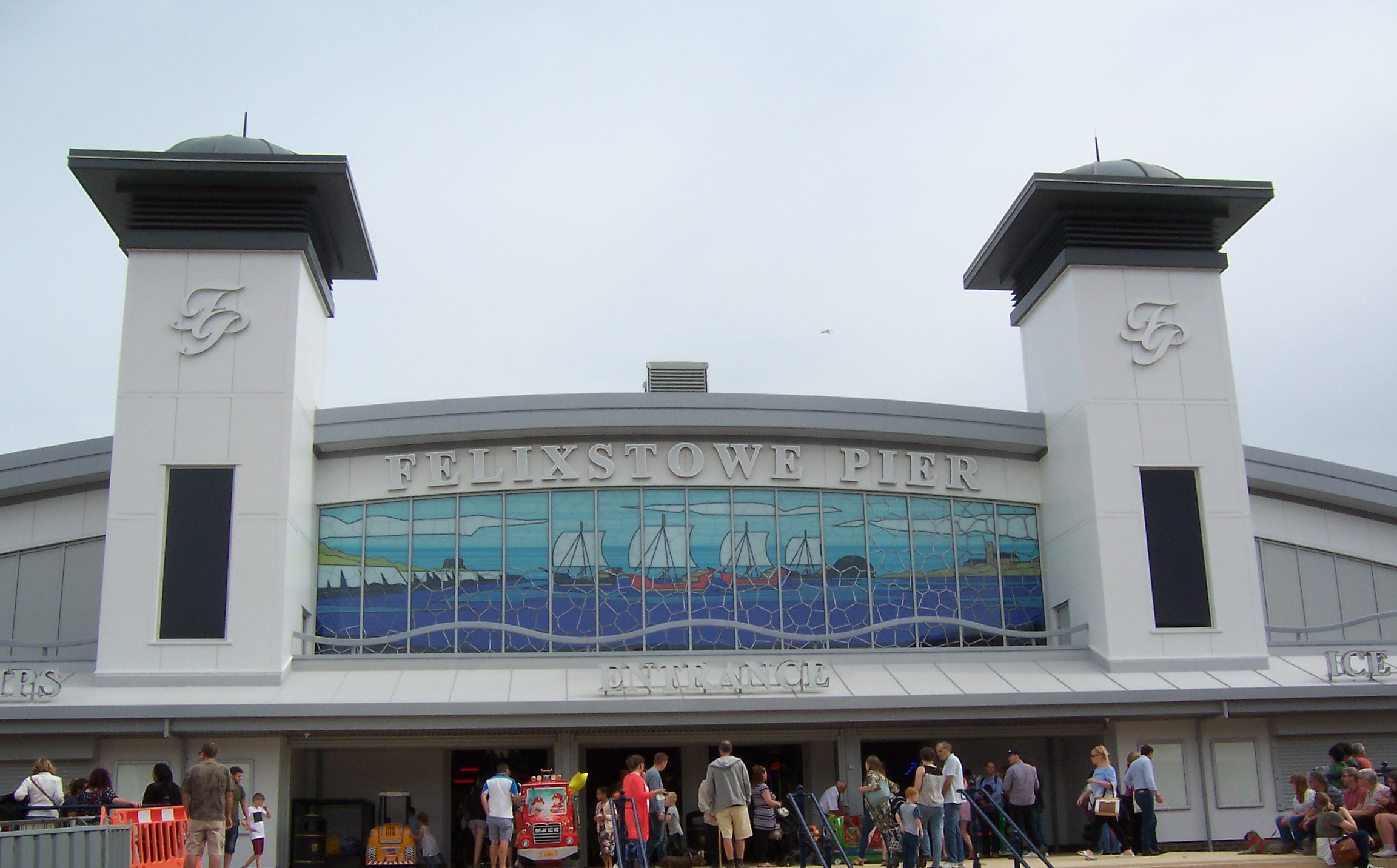
Felixstowe Pier

The pier was opened in 1906, rebuilt in late 2017, and re-opened in 2018. During the Second World War the majority of the pier, at the time one of the longest in the country and complete with its own train, was purposely demolished by the Royal Engineers to prevent it from being used as an easy landing point for enemy troops. After the war the damage was not repaired and the pier never regained its original length. The pier in its current incarnation features an amusement hall with a gambling section, traditional fish and chips and ice cream kiosks, and a restaurant/bar with indoor and outdoor seating. The deck spans the perimeter of the main building.

=== Railway stations ===
The sole remaining railway station Felixstowe, was opened in 1898. The well-preserved station building now houses a supermarket and shops.

In its prime the railway station saw more than twenty services a day and is now served by an hourly service to Ipswich. The station now has only one platform, which has been created from the far end of one of the original platforms. Felixstowe Beach railway station was demolished in 2004, despite a storm of protest from many local people keen on saving the historic building which the council had branded as "unsafe". The station was originally opened in 1877 and was used continuously until 1959, after which it was the site of a small printers for many years until its demolition.

From 1877 until 1951 there was also Felixstowe Pier railway station, sited inside the area of the modern day docks at a small pier popular with pleasure boats, and with a paddle steamer link to London. A dock next to the pier was approved in 1879.

== Transport ==
=== Shipping ===
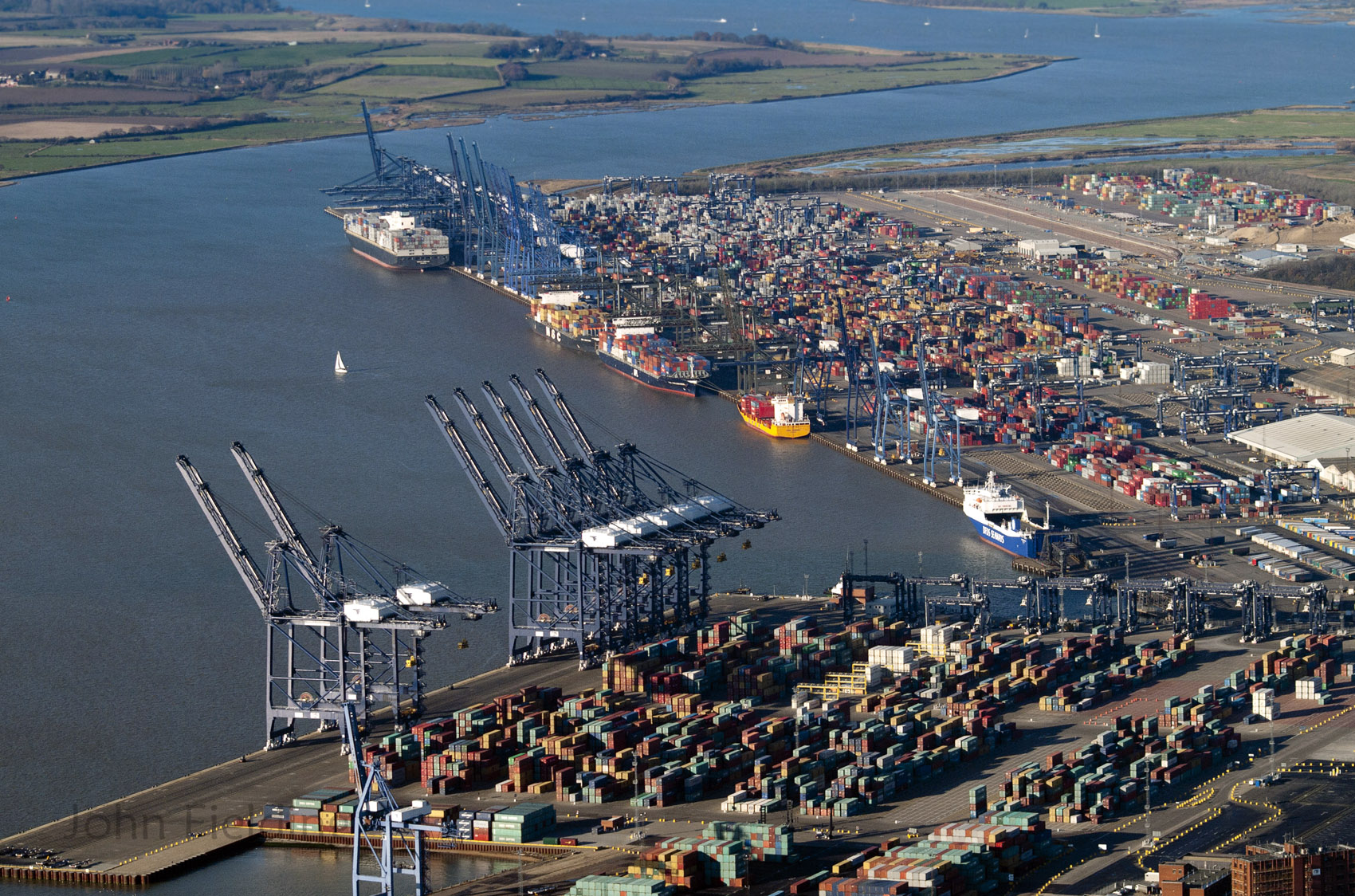
Port of Felixstowe

Felixstowe is Britain's largest container port.

The main navigation channel is dredged to 47 1/2 feet (14.5 m) below chart datum and a depth of up to 49 feet (15 m) alongside the quay. Felixstowe boasts deep-water able to accommodate the world's latest generation of deep-draughted ultra post-Panamax vessels. There is a continuous quay of 2.4 km, equipped with 25 ship-to-shore gantry cranes.

The town has road links to the Midlands, via the A14, and to London, via the A12 road. The single-track railway line to Ipswich has been upgraded recently to allow larger containers; many more are now transported by rail.

The port is owned by Hutchison Port Holdings Ltd with additional land on the peninsula owned by Trinity College, Cambridge. The port has its own Police Authority, which also currently has jurisdiction over the area local to the port, with permission from Suffolk Constabulary's Chief Constable. Alongside the Port Police, they also have their own joint ambulance and fire service; one of the port ambulances, call sign Alpha 1, can also come off port to attend 999 emergencies in Felixstowe.

=== Ferries ===
The Harwich Harbour Ferry operates between the View Point (near Landguard Fort) in Felixstowe and Ha'penny Pier, Harwich and Shotley Point throughout the summer. The Bawdsey Ferry crosses the River Deben from Felixstowe Ferry.

=== Railway ===
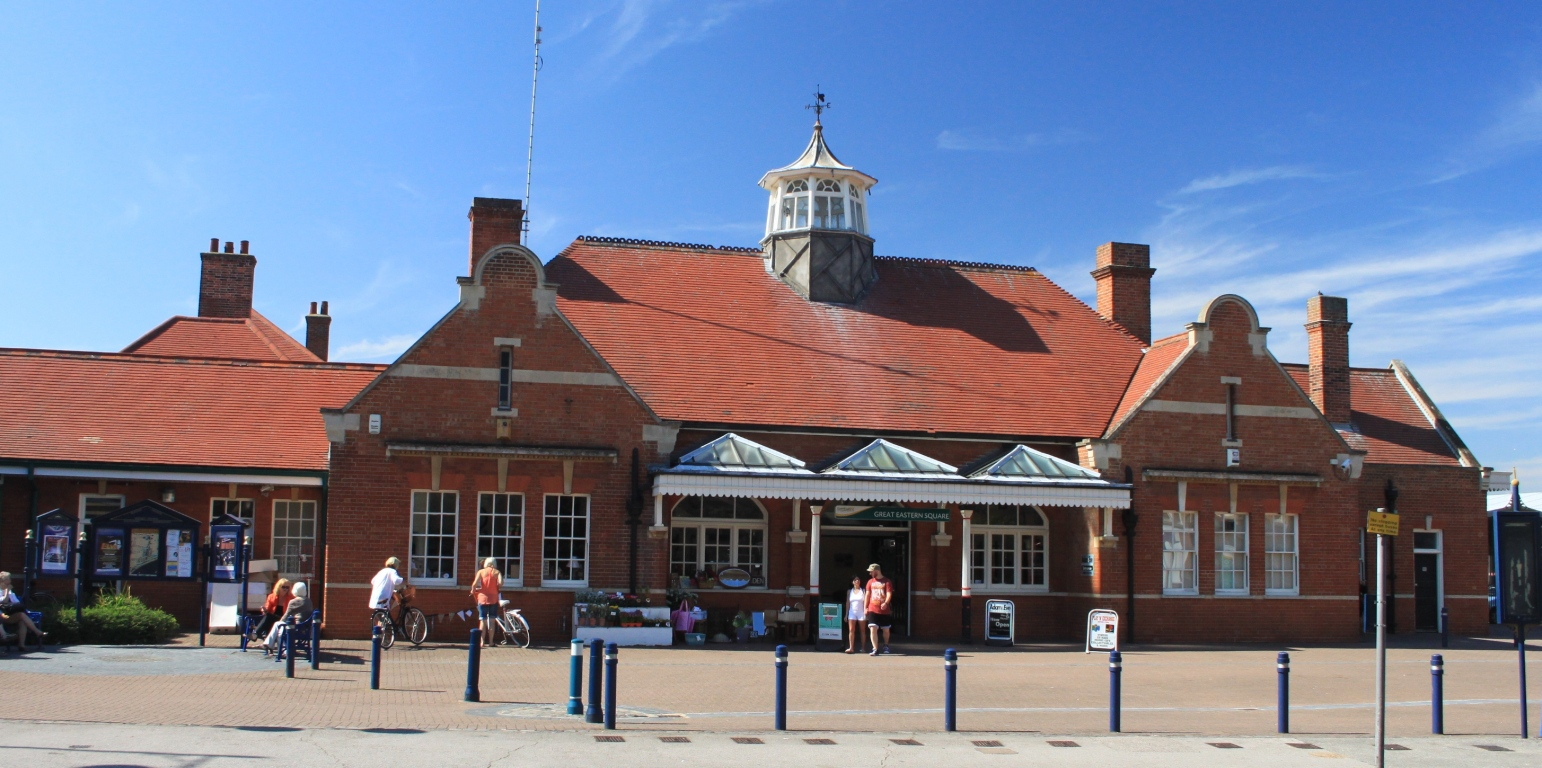
Felixstowe station

Felixstowe railway station is the eastern terminus of the passenger service to Ipswich, via the Felixstowe Branch Line; the line itself branches before the station, the other line goes on to the Port of Felixstowe.

=== Buses and coaches ===
Local bus services are operated by First Eastern Counties, with routes to Ipswich and Woodbridge.

The National Express coach service 481 provides a connection to London with intermediate stops at other major towns, such as Ipswich, Colchester, Witham, Chelmsford and Brentwood. A weekday service departs daily at 07:20 and returns at 18:00, while the weekend service departs at 07:55 and returns at 18:00.

== Governance ==
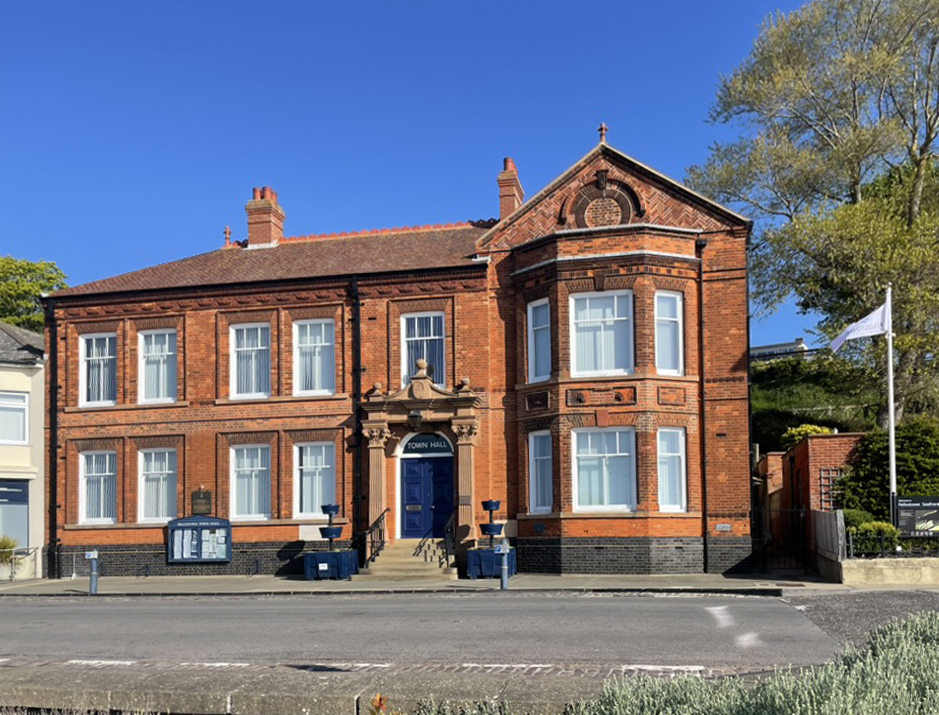
Felixstowe town hall

Felixstowe is administered by Suffolk County Council, East Suffolk Council and Felixstowe Town Council. The local parish council, Felixstowe Town Council, is based in Felixstowe Town Hall, on the seafront at Undercliff Road West.

Felixstowe lies within the Suffolk Coastal parliamentary constituency; Jenny Riddell-Carpenter of the Labour Party was elected as the Member of Parliament in the 2024 General Election.

In 1894 an urban district called "Felixstowe and Walton" was formed which contained the parishes of "Felixstowe" and "Walton", in 1889 it became part of the administrative county of East Suffolk. In 1914 Walton parish was merged with Felixstowe and the urban district was renamed to just "Felixstowe". On 1 April 1974 the district was abolished and became part of Suffolk Coastal in the non-metropolitan county of Suffolk. A successor parish was formed covering the same area as the former district and its parish. In 2019 Felixstowe became part of East Suffolk district.

== Landmarks ==
Landguard Fort is a scheduled ancient monument and visitor attraction with a nearby community nature reserve. At the opposite end of the town is Felixstowe Ferry Golf Club, which is amongst the oldest in the UK, having been established in 1881. The Rt. Hon. Arthur Balfour, British Prime Minister from 1902 to 1905, was captain of the golf club in 1889.

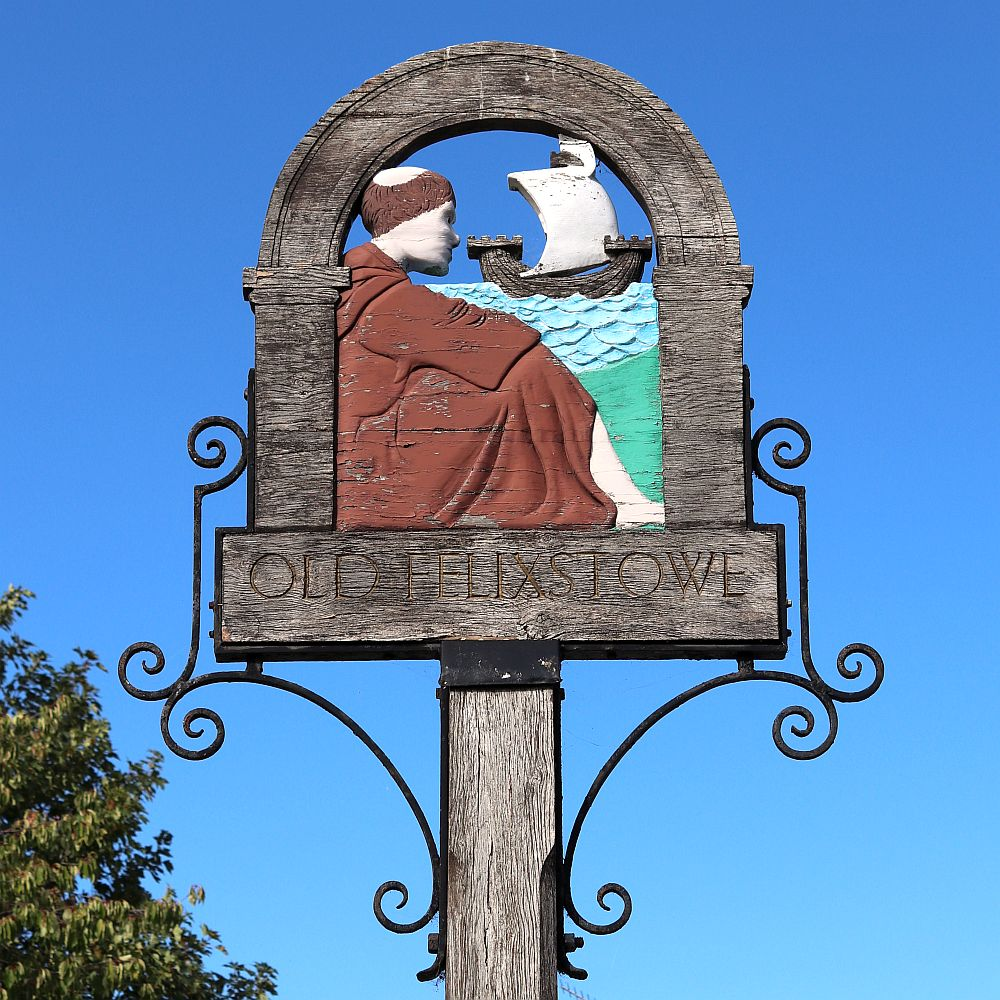
Old Felixstowe village sign

Felixstowe has a recently refurbished sandy beach south from the pier, and a stoney beach north of the pier. A Victorian promenade runs along part of the beach, from the nature reserve in the southwest to Cobbolds Point (Maybush Lane in east), with traditional beach huts along most of that length. An amusement arcade with snooker halls and food outlets occupies the southern end. The pier, incorporating a cafe and amusement arcade, stands before a leisure centre, with swimming pool, owned by the local council, now managed by a contractor.

Cobbolds Point takes its name from Felix Cobbold, who built Felixstowe Lodge, now known as Cranmer House, and associated sea wall at the bottom of Maybush Lane in 1885. It is a Grade II-listed mock Elizabethan mansion by Thomas Cotman. Its listing describes it as "a fine house of the period reflecting the wealth of this important Suffolk family of brewers". However Felix was involved in the banking and insurance interests of the family rather than its brewing assets.

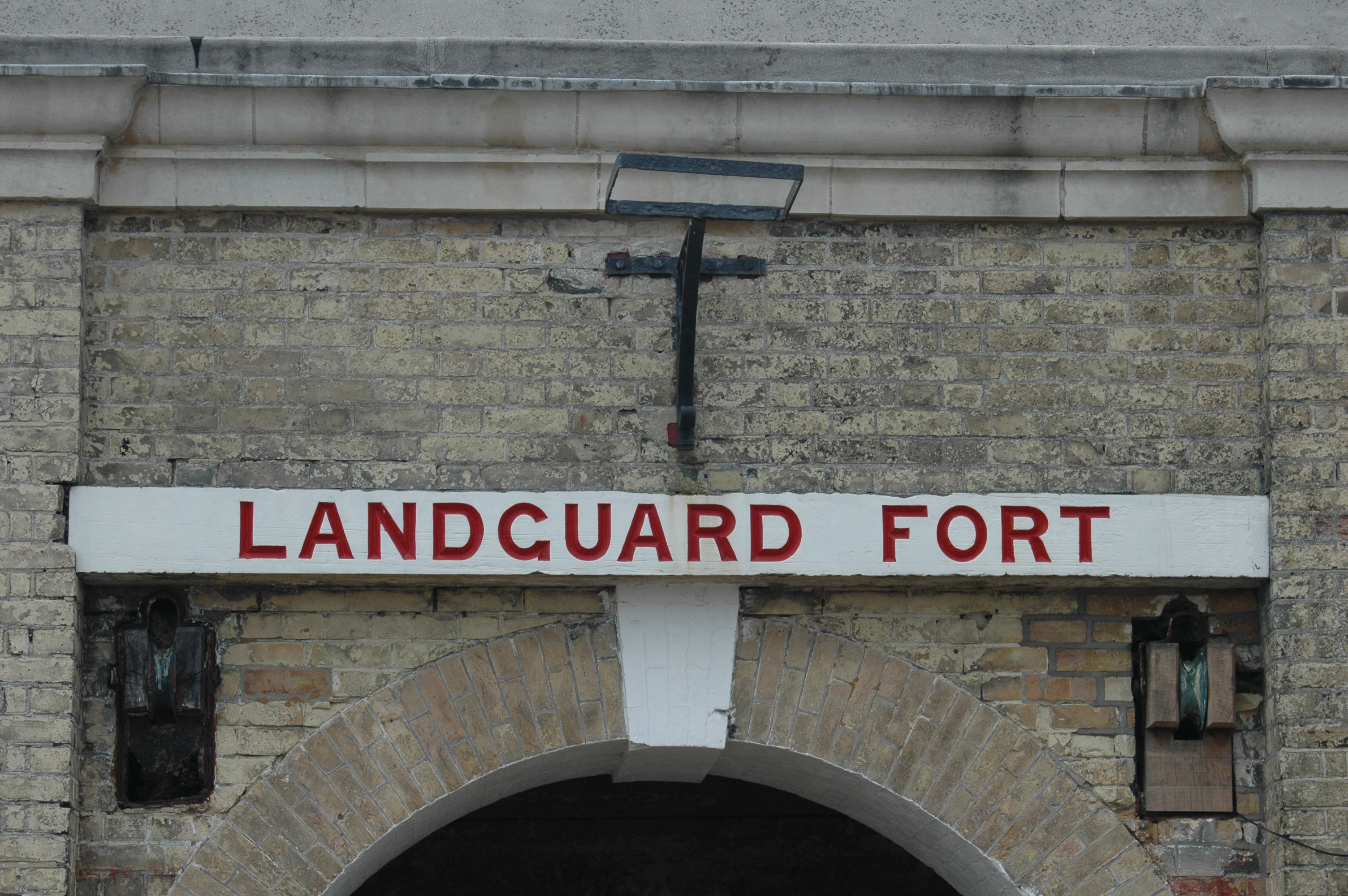
A view of Landguard Fort

Cotman, the architect, designed a number of buildings in Felixstowe including the railway station, Harvest House (Felix Hotel), the Orwell and Bath Hotels, Barclays and Lloyds Banks plus many others. He also designed and lived in the original bungalow that forms the lower two floors of Cotman Lodge care home. He was the nephew of John Sell Cotman, the famous Norwich water-colour artist.

The Art Deco style of architecture has been used for some buildings. The Cavendish Hotel in Sea Road, demolished in 1988, was in this style. There is another example in Undercliff Road West, which has been home to the Felixstowe Tourist Information Centre.

From Brackenberry Fort to Felixstowe Ferry there is a walkway and is the start of the 50-mile Suffolk Coast Path. At low tide from Jacob's Ladder, it is possible to glimpse the seaweed-covered remains of a Roman fort, which could possibly be the place of Dommoc, in the water about 50 yards from the coast, where it suggested St Felix first landed in England.

== Healthcare ==
=== The Herman de Stern Convalescent Home ===
This was built on the sea front, had 19 beds and was open from about 1902 until the 1970s. It was run by The London Hospital to provide a space where patients could recuperate by the sea. Nurses were also sometimes sent there from The London. After its closure the home became the Herman de Sterne Centre. Following a severe fire it was demolished in 2006. Two matrons who had trained at The London Hospital, under Eva Luckes were Lucy Walmsley (1902–1908) and Agnes Prentice Leck (1908–at least 1919).

== Tourism ==
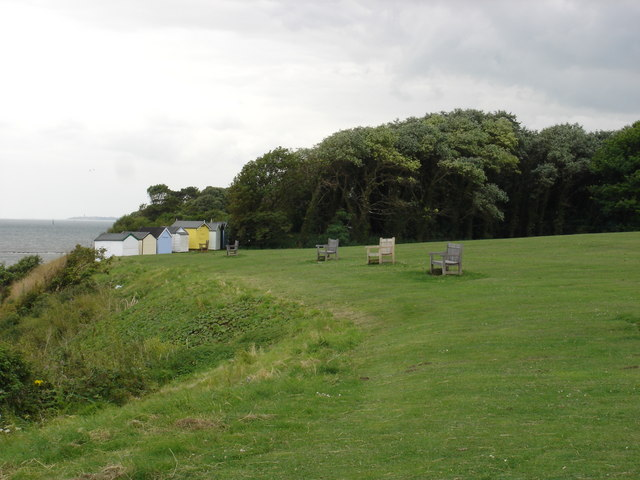
Clifftop at Felixstowe

Felixstowe draws tourist visitors and has traditional seaside offerings such as Felixstowe Pier and the Seafront Gardens. There is also the Forum Amusement Centre, Ocean Boulevard and Manning's Amusements. Visitors can also see Landguard Fort, Landguard Nature Reserve, Felixstowe Ferry and the Felixstowe Museum. There are a number of hotels and guesthouses, self-catering properties and camping/caravanning sites catering for visitors.

== Sport ==
Felixstowe Rugby Union Football Club was founded in 1930 and plays in the Eastern Counties Leagues.

Felixstowe Hockey Club has three men's teams and three ladies' team. The men's first team play in Eastern Division 2 North East. The club was voted England Hockey's "club of the season" in 2014.

The town's only senior football team, Felixstowe & Walton United, compete in the Isthmian North Division (Step 4). Felixstowe and Walton also have junior teams as well as a reserve team.

The town has a sports centre, the Brackenbury in High Road East, and football, hockey and rugby pitches, together with four bowling greens and other sporting facilities. The sports centre, owned by the council, is managed by a contractor.

Felixstowe Golf Club is a links course to the northeast of the town centre. The now defunct Eastward Ho! Golf Club first appeared prior to the First World War. The club closed at the time of the Second World War.

Felixstowe Ferry Sailing Club is located beyond the golf course at the Bawdsey Ferry end of the town. It sometimes hosts national and international championships for various dinghy classes.

== Leisure facilities ==
The town has two main leisure facilities: the Brackenbury Sports Centre in Old Felixstowe and the Felixstowe Leisure Centre adjacent to the pier. There is a bowls club and a tennis club has hosted a large post-Wimbledon tournament. There is also a community centre, run by the Old Felixstowe Community Association (OFCA) in Ferry Road.

The library was refurbished in 2006 at a cost of £1,500,000 and has since won national awards.

Felixstowe has a Royal Air Force Air Cadets Unit, 356 (Felixstowe) Squadron Air Training Corps which has been active since 13 February 1941. The squadron's headquarters is built on the site where the former RAF Felixstowe guardhouse once stood.

== Parks ==
=== Langer Park ===
The most southern park in Felixstowe is Langer Park, which lies between the railway line running north from the Port of Felixstowe and the houses running along the western side of Langer Road. Its north and south parameters are given by the Lidl superstore and Beach Station Road accordingly, giving the park a long rectangular-like shape. The park contains a narrow stream that is the remains of Walton Creek, which had originally run from the Ordinance Hotel (demolished as of late 2014 to make way for a Premier Inn) to the Felixstowe Dock Basin.

=== Coronation Recreation (Sports) Ground ===
Coronation Sports Ground is a sports ground in Felixstowe, Suffolk, located between Coronation Drive and Mill Lane. The site includes open green space used for organised sport, a children's play area, changing rooms, and a car park. Access is available from Coronation Drive, Mill Lane, and Kings Fleet Road.

The ground was officially opened on 1 May 1956 by H.R.H. The Duke of Edinburgh.

It is home to Felixstowe Rugby Union Football Club, but historically, has been used by Felixstowe & Corinthians CC.

=== The Grove and Eastward Ho ===
The largest and most northern of the Felixstowe parks consists of a woodland named The Grove, adjacent to Eastward Ho playing fields. The Grove woodland is formed mainly of ash, oak and sycamore trees, whilst allium ursinum or wild garlic grows here during the spring. Eastward Ho was originally a golf course but nowadays is a public recreational space featuring a number of football pitches, changing facilities and an enclosed children's play area. The play area features in the music video for Ed Sheeran's single "Castle on the Hill". On the western side of The Grove is another woodland named Abbey Grove, planted in 1998 and maintained by The Woodland Trust with permitted access to the public.

=== Felixstowe Skatepark ===
Original ideas for a skate park were addressed in 2004 by the Felixstowe Skate Association, who organised a number of meetings and poster campaigns to start the project. They also brought out newsletters to help build public opinion of the idea, which attracted attention from other groups. Level Two (a local youth organization) eventually took up management of the fundraising process and in 2007 managed to secure a grant of £25,000 from the government's youth opportunity fund. Additionally by this date, the Felixstowe Town Council had already set aside £30,000 for the project, as well as £15,000 agreed upon by the Suffolk Coastal cabinet and £40,000 from the playspace fund. When completed the project took a total of £180,000, and was opened at a community event on 1 September 2009. The original designs by the FSA included provisions for CCTV and floodlights to ensure youth safety, and further into the design process some metal wire cages of rocks added to help soundproof the area.

=== Allenby Park ===
Named after the late Edmund Henry Hynman Allenby (see notable persons section), the park was formed in 1923 when the Allenby owned Felixstowe House was demolished at the passing of Catherine Allenby. It also used to be the site of the Eastern Counties Bible Convention from 1920 to 1939 until it was held inside churches. It consists of a small all-weather football playing field, a sectioned off children's play area, and winded path around the layout of the park. Park access can be gained from Constable Road.

=== Seaton Park (Harpers) ===
Enclosed between Cornwall Road, Margaret Street, Cage Lane and Seaton Road is Seaton Park. The park is rectangular in shape and mainly consists of open space with an enclosed children's play area.

=== Clifftops ===
Clifftops is accessed from Cliff Road next to Felixstowe Ferry Golf Club and is the most easterly park in Felixstowe. As the name suggests, the park sits atop cliffs overlooking the North Sea, Deben Estuary and golf course. This is primarily used as pay and display car parking with a large grass open area used for both recreation and for overflow parking during peak times. Toilet facilities are available on site. The beach below can be accessed on foot via steps.

== Churches ==
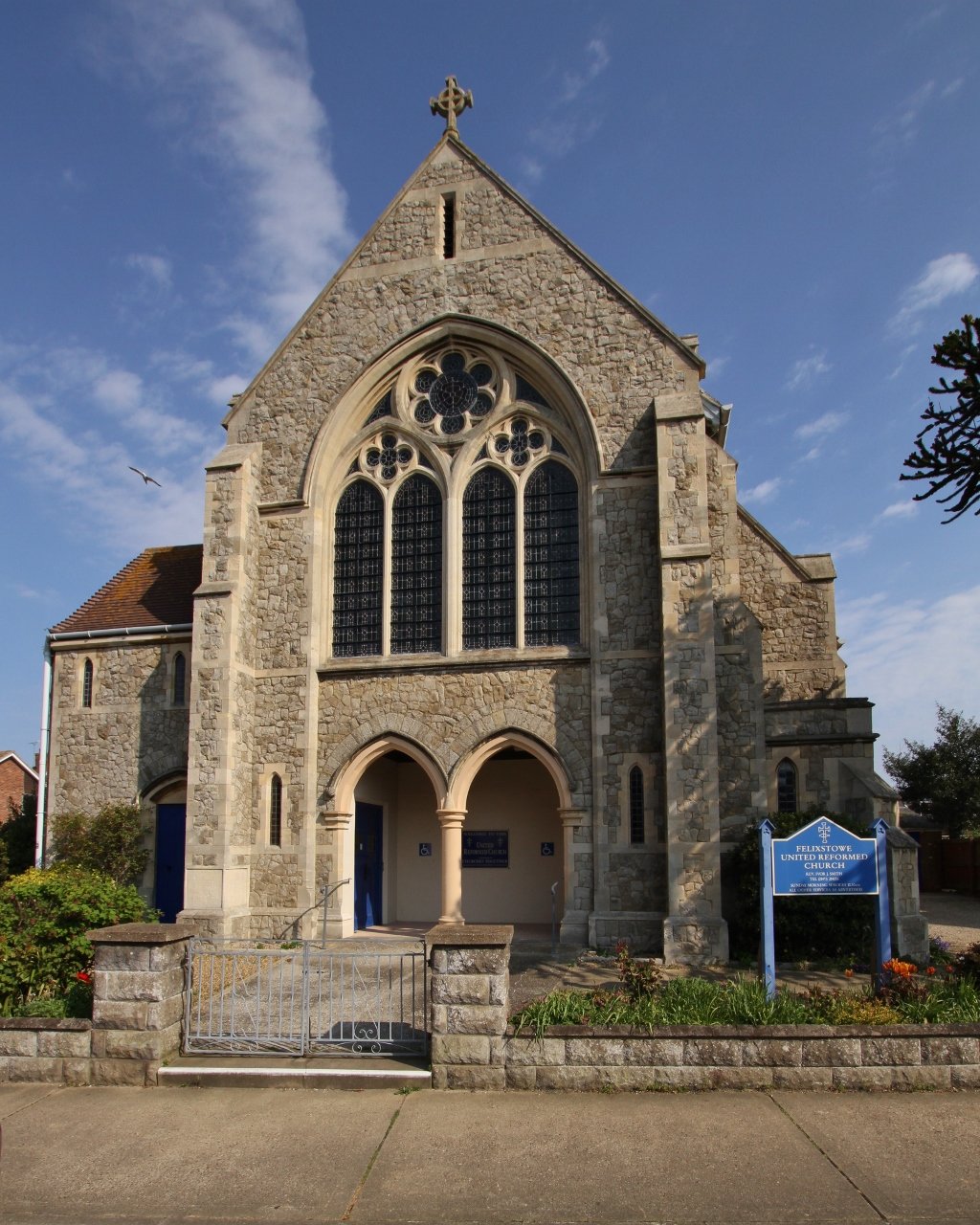
United Reformed Church on Orwell Road

Felixstowe's Church of England parish churches include Christ Church, St Andrew, St Edmund, St John the Baptist, St Mary the Virgin, SS Peter and Paul with SS Andrew and Nicholas and St Philip. Felixstowe has Baptist, Free, Methodist, Roman Catholic, Russian Orthodox and United Reformed churches.

== Media ==
Regional TV news is provided by BBC East and ITV Anglia. Television signals are received from the Sudbury and local relay transmitters.

Local radio stations are BBC Radio Suffolk on 103.9 FM, Heart East on 97.1 FM, Greatest Hits Radio Ipswich & Suffolk on 106.4 FM, and community-based station Felixstowe Radio on 107.5 FM.

The local newspapers are the Ipswich Star and East Anglian Daily Times.

== Offshore radio ==
The first pirate radio station off the British coast operated from a ship anchored off Felixstowe.

Radio Caroline ship MV Caroline was outside the three-mile limit at Easter 1964. It was the very first UK radio station aboard a ship in the North Sea, and intended to break the monopoly of the BBC. Radio Caroline had about seven million listeners in its first week on air. The station's slogan was Your all-day music station, and it initially broadcast from 6 am to 6 pm, seven days a week. The transmitter had a power of 10 kW on 199 metres – 1.520 kHz. The ship moved to waters off the Isle of Man in July 1964 to become Radio Caroline North, while MV Mi-Amigo of Radio Atlanta on 201 metres became Radio Caroline South, broadcasting on first 199 later on 259 metres – 1.178 kHz with 50 kW of power on medium wave. Mi Amigo remained in waters off Clacton-on-Sea, Essex.

Felixstowe Museum installed an offshore radio display in their tearoom in 2015. This is being moved and expanded into the Museum itself from 2019, as part of a 1960s themed display.

== Literature ==
Felixstowe was identified by the academic and celebrated ghost-story author M.R. James as the location upon which his fictitious town of Burnstow was based. Burnstow appeared in both of James' short ghost stories "'Oh, Whistle, and I'll Come to You, My Lad'" and "The Tractate Middoth", published in Ghost Stories of an Antiquary in 1904.

Poet John Betjeman briefly lodged in Felixstowe and wrote a poem called Felixstowe or "The last of her order".

Author Liz Trenow set her 2020 novel Under a Wartime Sky in Felixstowe and at Bawdsey Manor, just the other side of the Deben estuary where in the years leading up to the Second World War, and under great secrecy, Robert Watson Watt and his team invented and perfected radar systems, and which became RAF Bawdsey, site of the first radar station.

== Notable residents ==
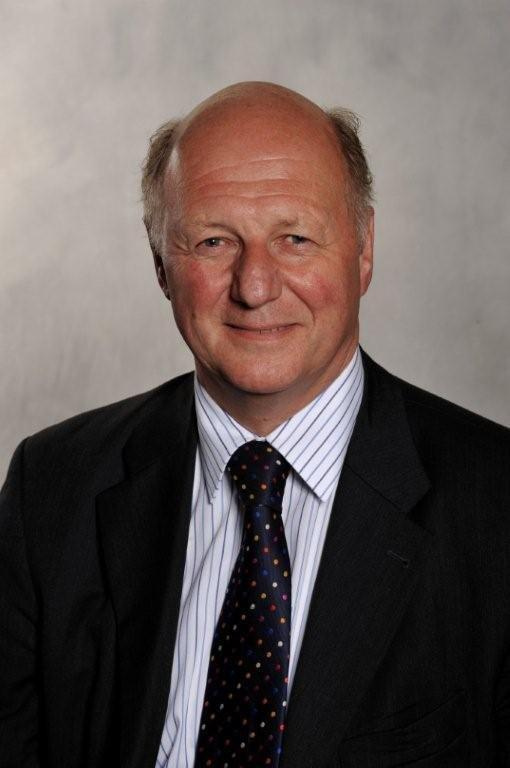
Jim Paice MP, 2011

People originating from or associated with Felixstowe include:

- Sir John Hayward (c.1564–1627), an English historian, lawyer and politician
- Henry Stebbing (1687–1763) English churchman and controversialist, became Archdeacon of Wilts
- Sir Henry David Jones (1791–1866), a British Army officer who became Governor of the Royal Military College, Sandhurst
- Henry MacLauchlan (1792–1882), a British military, geological and archaeological surveyor
- John Cyril Porte (1884–1919), flying boat pioneer and Station Commander, RNAS Felixstowe
- Terence Gray (1895–1986), theatre producer and in later life Taoist author under the name Wei Wu Wei
- Barbara Ward (1914–1981), economist and writer, pupil at Jesus & Mary Convent in Felixstowe
- John Bridgeman (1916–2004), an English sculptor
- Sir Thomas Hinde (1926–2014), a British novelist
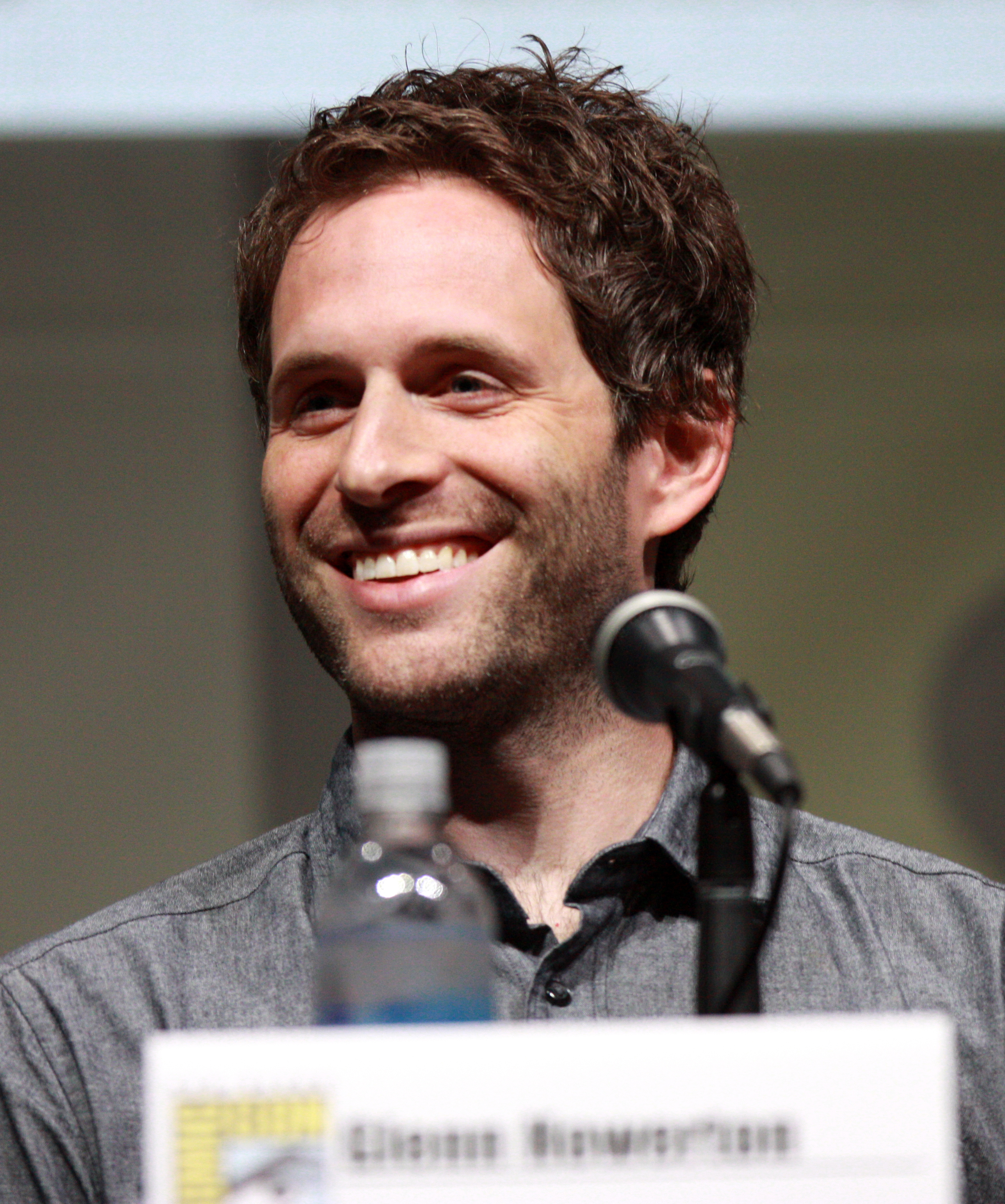
- Glenn Howerton
  Len Evans (1930–2006), Australian promoter, taster and drinker of wine
- Robbie Vincent (born 1947), an English radio broadcaster and DJ
- Iain Hook (1948–2002), UNRWA officer, killed in the line of duty
- Sir James Paice (born 1949), a Conservative Party politician and MP for South East Cambridgeshire, from 1987 to 2015
- Mark Fisher (1968–2017), cultural theorist, author and blogger
- The Shadow Project (formed in 2003), an English electro rock band

=== Actors ===
- Sir John Mills (1908–2005), an English actor who appeared in more than 120 films in a career spanning seven decades
- Megs Jenkins (1917–1998), actor
- Dawn Addams (1930–1985), an English actress
- Christopher Strauli (born 1946), film, television and theatre actor, went to school in Felixstowe
- Noma Dumezweni (born 1969), Oliver Award-winning British actress, grew up and went to school in Felixstowe.
- Nicholas Pandolfi (born 1970), broadcaster and actor
- Glenn Howerton (born 1976), American actor lived in Felixstowe for several years in his childhood.

=== Sport ===
- Simon Clements (born 1956), cricketer
- Matt Bloomfield (born 1984), football manager of Oxford United.
- Jack Ainsley (born 1990), footballer
- Arnold Allen (born 1994), professional MMA Fighter in UFC

== Twin towns ==
Felixstowe is twinned with:

- Wesel, Germany (since 1972)
- Salzwedel, Germany (since 1994)
