= Dogs (Beware of Safety album) =

dogs

Studio album by Beware of Safety
- Released: 2009
- Recorded: 2009
- Genres: Post rock Post metal
- Length: 67:58
- Label: The Mylene Sheath

Beware of Safety chronology
It Is Curtains (2007)	dogs (2009)

dogs is the first studio album by American post rock band Beware of Safety. It was released in 2009.

== Track listing ==
1. "Nu Metal" - 10:43
2. "The Supposed Common" - 8:02
3. "Step Or Stone" - 5:29
4. "Hexa" - 7:34
5. "Circa" - 2:24
6. "Dogs" - 2:46
7. "Yards and Yards" - 9:13
8. "Light of Day" - 3:29
9. "The Laughter Died" - 10:16
10. "Raingarden" - 7:39

== Personnel ==
- Steve Molter - guitar
- Adam Kay - guitar
- Jeff Zemina - guitar
- Morgan Hendry - drums
- Patrick Murphy - Recording engineer, mixing
- Paul Pavao - Recording engineer (drums)
- Dave Collins - Mastering
- Shannon Dejongh - Violin, viola

== Release details ==
- 2009, US, The Mylene Sheath SHEATH011, release date 2009, CD
