= I Am Responsible =

Studio album by EF
- Released: February 1, 2008
- Genre: Post-Rock
- Length: 58:00
- Label: And The Sound Records
- Producer: EF and Patrik Torsson

EF chronology
Give Me Beauty... Or Give Me Death! (2006)	I Am Responsible (2008)	Mourning Golden Morning (2010)

Professional ratings
Review scores
Source	Rating
Decoy Music	4.5/5 stars

I Am Responsible is the second studio album by Swedish post-rock band EF. It was released through And The Sound Records in the UK.

According to their Bandcamp page: "The second "hard" 2008-album for EF is a more darker and moody story even if you can still hear those typical hopeful melodies and harmonies that is very typical for the band. During this period EF lost member Daniel Öhman and included two new members for the song writing session. Jonathan Hammar - cello/guitar and Claes Strängberg - guitar/vocals. Claes can also be found in Sweden's finest ambient pop band Immanu El.. The track "Bear" includes a sample from the Columbine High School massacre .

The album was reissued in 2012, after being completely remixed and remastered by Magnus Lindberg from Cult of Luna. The reissue also include a remix of "Bear" by Udo Rabenstein called "Grizzly".

== Track listing ==
All tracks are written by Niklas Åström, Jonatan Hammar, Mikael Hillergård, Claes Strängberg, Tomas Torsson except where noted.

No.	Title	Music	Length
1.	"Soon"		2:54
2.	"Två"		10:39
3.	"Bear"	Åström, Hammar, Hillergård, Daniel Öhman, Strängberg, Torsson	16:47
4.	"Thrills"		6:49
5.	"Appendix"		7:01
6.	"A Tailpiece"	Åström, Hammar, Hillergård, Öhman, Strängberg, Torsson	14:03

Bonus track (2012 reissue)
No.	Title	Length
7.	"Grizzly (Bear Remix)"	6:40

== Personnel ==
EF

- Tomas Torsson – guitar, vocals
- Claes Strängberg – guitar, vocals
- Jonatan Hammar – cello, guitar
- Mikael Hillergård – electric bass
- Niklas Åström – drums, artwork

Additional musicians

- Johan Stensson – additional violin on "Två"
- Marie-Louise Granström – additional violin on "Två"
- Karl-Johan Råsmark – additional violin on "A Tailpiece"

Production

- Emanuel Olsson – recording engineer; original mix and mastering (2008 release)
- Magnus Lindberg – editing, remixing, remastering (2012 reissue)
- Erik Gustafsson – artwork
- Kheira Linder – artwork
- Hanna Aldén – cover photo
