= Felixstowe Town Hall =

Municipal building in Felixstowe, Suffolk, England

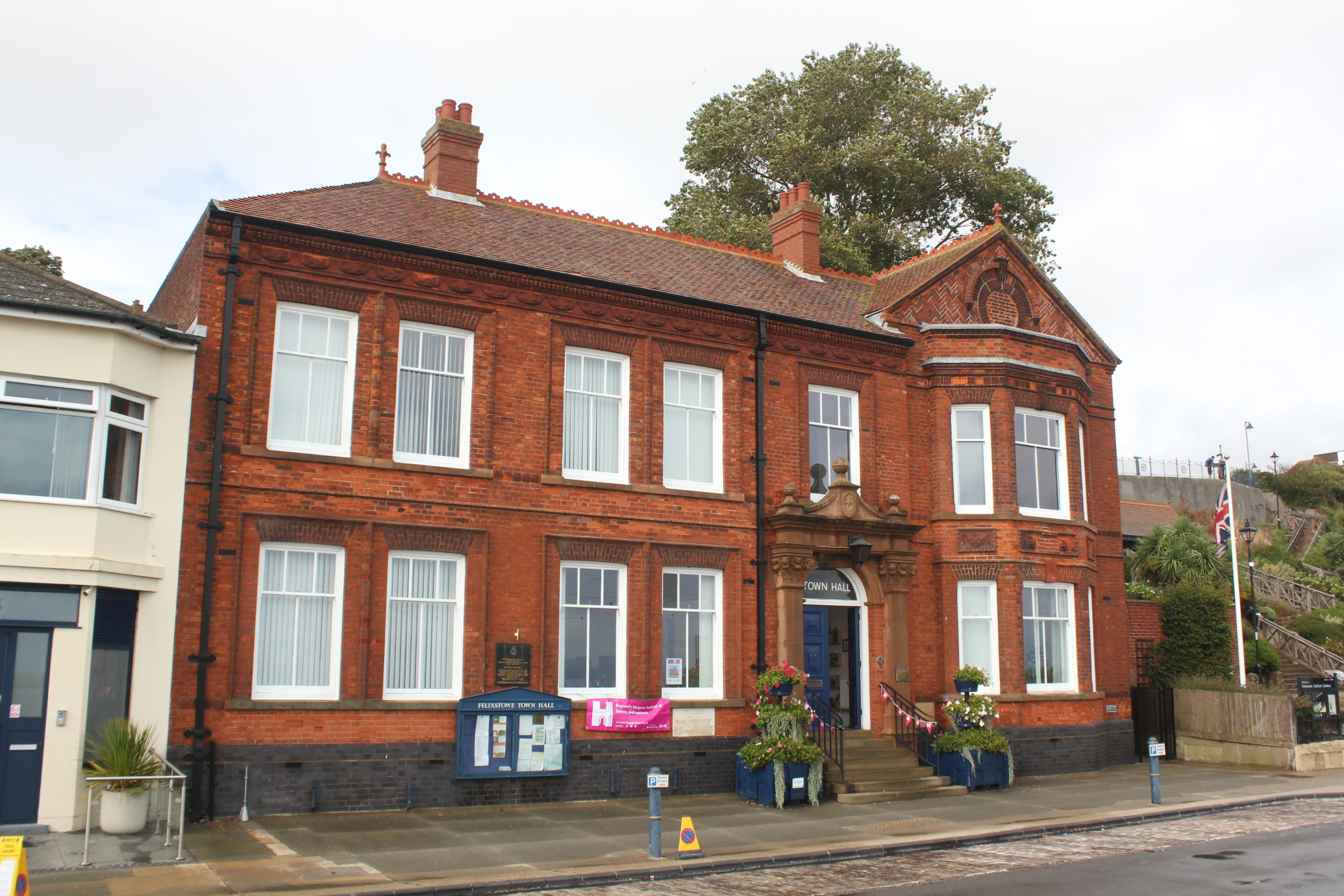
- Felixstowe Town Hall

- Shown in Suffolk
- 51.9593°N 1.3483°E
- Location: Undercliff Road West, Felixstowe

History
- Built: 1892

Site notes
- Architect: George Horton
- Architectural style: Victorian style

Felixstowe Town Hall is a municipal building in Undercliff Road West, Felixstowe, Suffolk, England. The building is the meeting place of Felixstowe Town Council.

== History ==
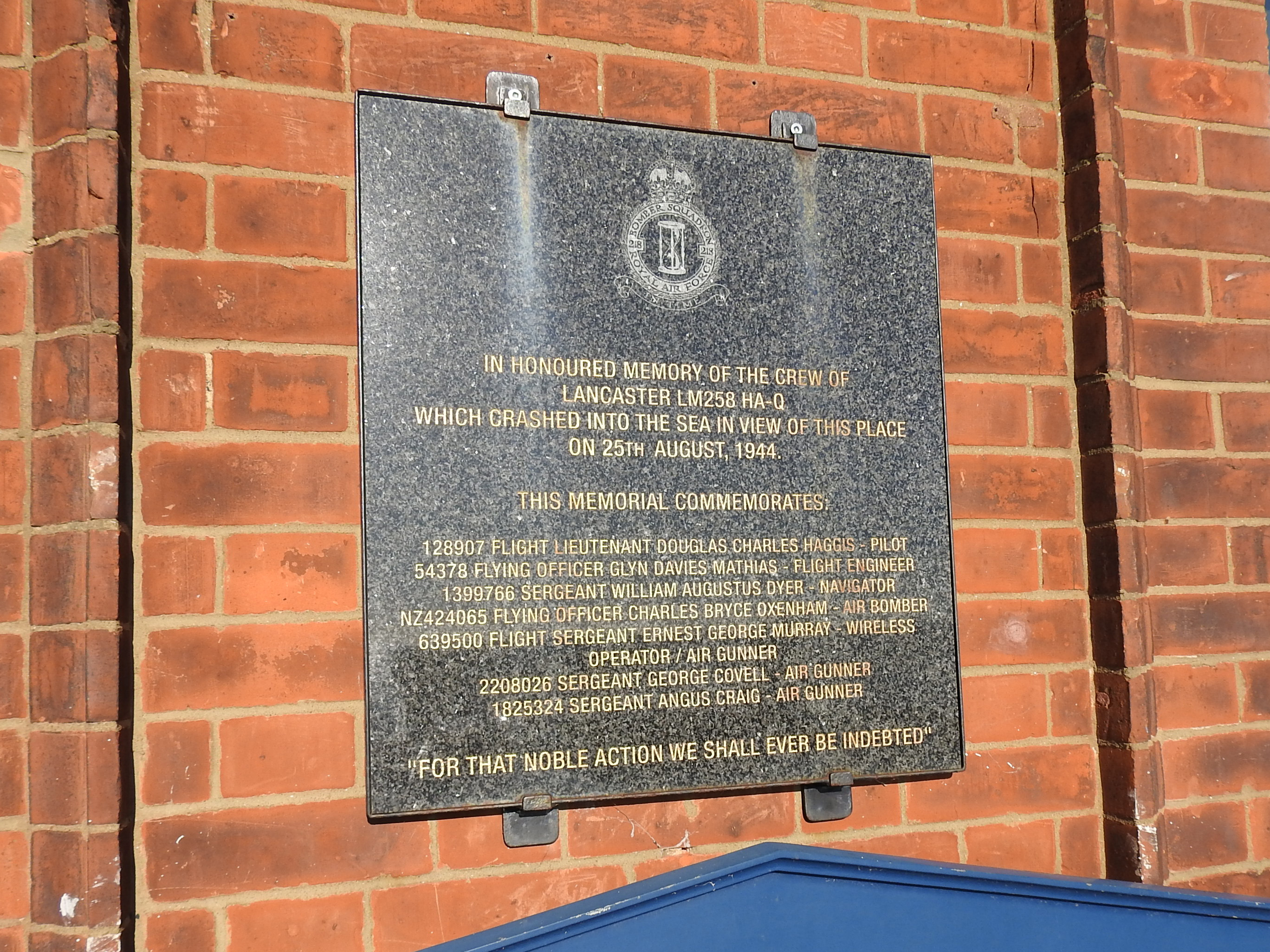
Plaque on the front of the town hall

Following the formation of a local board of health for Felixstowe and Walton in 1887, one of the first actions of the new board was to commission public offices for the area. The site they selected, which was on the seafront, was given to the town by the lord of the manor, E. G. Pretyman, who lived at Orwell Park. The foundation stone for the new building was laid by the member of parliament, Felix Cobbold in January 1892. It was designed by the borough surveyor, George Horton, in the Victorian style, built by local builders, Harcourt Runnacles & Co., in red brick with terracotta dressings at a cost of £1,800 and was completed later that year.

The design involved an asymmetrical main frontage with six bays facing onto the Market Square. The first four bays from the left were fenestrated by sash windows on both floors. The fifth bay featured a doorway which was flanked by Corinthian order pilasters supporting an entablature which was surmounted by a cartouche and three finials. The right hand bay was fenestrated by canted bay windows on both floors; there were terracotta panels, carved with festoons, between the floors, and the bay was surmounted by a pediment with a blind oculus in the tympanum. Internally, the principal rooms were the board room, the town clerk's office and a waiting room.

Following significant population growth, largely associated with the tourism industry, the area became an urban district, with the town hall as its headquarters, in 1894. The building, which also accommodated the local magistrates' court, was the venue for the initial stages of the trial of the suffragettes, Florence Tunks and Hilda Burkitt, who were charged with arson for the burning down of the Bath Hotel in Felixstowe in April 1914.

In 1927, the chairman of the council, standing on the steps of the town hall, congratulated the Samuel Kinkead and the team from the Marine Aircraft Experimental Establishment in Felixstowe for winning the Schneider Trophy in a Supermarine. In August 1944, during the Second World War, a Lancaster bomber, while returning to RAF Felixstowe from operations, crashed into the sea off Felixstowe with the loss of all on board, in a deliberate act by the pilot, in order to avoid crashing onto the town: a plaque was subsequently placed on the front of the town hall to commemorate their bravery.

The building continued to serve as the headquarters of the urban district council for much of the 20th century, but ceased to be the local seat of government when the enlarged Suffolk Coastal District Council was formed in 1974. It subsequently became the meeting place of Felixstowe Town Council but ceased operating as a magistrates' court after the courts service relocated in 1998. The town council borrowed sufficient funds from the Public Works Loan Board in order to buy the building from the district council in 2007. An extensive programme of refurbishment works, which included installing a lift, was completed to a design by Peter Jaggard-Rees Pryer and completed in 2008. Works of art in the town hall include a landscape painting by David James entitled A North Cornish breaker.
