= It Is Curtains =

EP by Beware of Safety
- Released: 2007
- Recorded: 2007
- Genres: Post rock Post metal
- Length: 38:23
- Label: The Mylene Sheath

Beware of Safety chronology
It Is Curtains (2007)	dogs (2009)

It Is Curtains is the first EP by American post rock band Beware of Safety. It was released in 2007.

== Track listing ==
1. "Kaura" - 5:19
2. "Weak Wrists" - 6:56
3. "The Difference Between Wind and Rain" - 6:25
4. "Veneklasen" - 2:20
5. "O'Canada" - 6:26
6. "To the Roof! Let's Jump and Fall" - 10:24

== Personnel ==
- Steve Molter – guitar
- Adam Kay – guitar
- Jeff Zemina – guitar
- Morgan Hendry – drums

== Release details ==
- 2007, US, The Mylene Sheath, release date 2007, CD
