= What You Keep Close =

EP by Riverbeds
- Released: February 5, 2015
- Recorded: Evermoor Audio and various locations (2014)
- Genre: Indie Rock, Post-Rock
- Length: 28:54
- Label: Self released

Riverbeds chronology
Hiding Small Things In Obvious Places (2012)	What You Keep Close (2015)	CARE (2019)

Professional ratings
Review scores
Source	Rating
Critique De Salon	3.85/5 stars
Rockmagazyn	3.0/5 stars

What You Keep Close is the second studio EP by Canadian band Riverbeds, which was recorded in 2014. The album title was announced in December with a release date of February 5th 2015 for both physical and digital copies. It was self produced, with mixing handled by Ben Cardilli at Road Test Studio with assistance by Kevin Brunelle.

== Track listing ==
1. "Forth" – 4:41
2. "Doubling Down On Diamonds" – 4:03
3. "Homa Lone" – 6:03
4. "Between Yellow And Blue" – 4:53
5. "Numbers" – 3:03
6. "Always More" – 6:11

== Personnel ==
=== Riverbeds ===
- Alexandre Duhamel Gingras – bass, backing vocals
- Charles-André Chamard – drums, vocals
- Fred Béland – guitar, backing vocals
- Vincent Pigeon – vocals, guitar, keyboard

=== Other ===
- Denis Falardeau – trumpet
- Ben Cardilli – mixing
- Kevin Brunelle – mixing
- Connor Seidel – drum engineer
- Liz Labelle – Additional lyrics on Between Yellow And Blue
- Marie-Ève Archambault – album design
- Emily Desjardins – art installation and picture of front cover
