= The Shadow Project =

English rock band

- Origin: Felixstowe, Suffolk, England
- Genres: Post-rock, electronica
- Years active: 2003–2007, 2011–present
- Label: NROne Records
- Members: Tom Askew; Stephen Hurley; Simon McCarthy; Ben Wright
- Past members: Seni Chanapai; Stewart Page; Tim Phillips
- Website: theshadowproject.co.uk

The Shadow Project are an English electro rock band that formed in Felixstowe, Suffolk, England, in 2003. The original (and current) line-up consists of Tom Askew (Guitars), Stephen Hurley (Drums), Simon McCarthy (Guitars) and Ben Wright (Bass / Electronics) Noah Thomson(trumpet). Having released their debut album A Beauty To Fight For to critical acclaim in 2007, The Shadow Project split a year later. They reformed in 2011 with their comeback release "The Nature Boys" being described as "stunning' by BBC Introducing in the UK. The band remain firm favourites with Huw Stephens and Sigur Rós manager John Best (who had previously invited the band on tour).

The Shadow Project are known for their active charity work and recently contributed previously unreleased material to the 'Hope for Japan' charity; releasing a post-rock compilation album to raise money for the victims of the recent Tōhoku earthquake and tsunami disaster.

== History ==
The band formed in late 2003 when former Deben High School friends Tom Askew and Stephen Hurley decided to start writing music together. Hurley recommended Simon McCarthy join the pair as he shared a similar guitar playing style to that of Askew. He agreed and was soon accompanied by Ben Wright to augment electronic flavours into the largely instrumental tracks. Despite being scattered at various universities across England, the material grew quickly and the band played their first gig in their hometown of Felixstowe on 23 December that year. They were joined on stage by another friend, Seni Chanapai, on bass guitar.

=== Early years: 2004–2006 ===
In April 2004 The Shadow Project self-financed their first record. The four-track Objects Appear EP was recorded at Sickroom Studios in Norfolk with Owen Turner of Magoo on production duties. The record attracted local radio interest and the band soon found themselves playing gigs up and down the country (including support slots for the likes of Hot Chip and The Longcut as well as gigs alongside their local childhood heroes The Dawn Parade and Miss Black America). The demand for a full-time bass player led to Stewart Page joining the group (Stewart had played bass in Askew's previous band El Spoonio). Having quickly sold out of EPs, the band returned to the studio in December 2004 to record what would become the Voices EP. Released in January 2005, the record attracted a cult following and the title track would go on to become a fan favourite and the centre piece of their live shows. The remainder of 2005 saw the band take to larger stages and festival slots across the UK (with a significant fan base growing in Europe and China). By 2006 the band had signed to independent record label NROne Records in Norwich. A new EP (The Tears in Their Eyes Brought Destruction to the Skies) was recorded at Purple Studios in Trowse, Norfolk, though endless production difficulties led the band to eventually (and reluctantly) discard the recordings.

=== A Beauty To Fight For and splitting up: 2007 ===
Whilst the band were disappointed with their latest studio session, NROne Records thought differently and suggested The Shadow Project record an album instead. In February 2007 the band relocated to East London for six weeks to record, mix and master the album. The Way Recording Studio London in Hackney was chosen for its intimate working environment and warm analogue vibe while mastering duties were handed to Mandy Parnell at Electric Mastering, whose previous clients included Björk, The Crocketts and Mogwai (all of whom had been influences on the group during their teens). The band have referred to this period of time as the best of their lives though bass player Stewart Page felt unsure of his touring future in the group. This led the band to start rehearsing with friend Tim Phillips on bass guitar. On completion of the record, Stewart decided to stick with the band and Phillips switched to vocals and third guitar. The band were now a six-piece.

A Beauty To Fight For was released on 4 June 2007. In its first week it outsold all previous releases on the NROne Records label and remains their biggest selling album to date. BBC Radio 1's Huw Stephens described the record as "absolutely gorgeous" and promoted the band heavily on his show with regular repeats of his favourite track "All The Pretty Things". Drowned in Sound praised the band for pushing the post-rock boundaries in their review while German promoters Burning Eagle Bookings offered The Shadow Project their first European tour (the record made their top 100 chart in August 2007). Despite everything coming together for the band, the new dynamic as a six-piece was not clicking and personality clashes coupled with differing musical directions led the band to cease in September 2007 before officially announcing their break-up in early 2008.

=== Post-breakup: 2007–2010 ===
Remaining friends, Stephen, Tim and Tom went on to form indie synth band 'Buried in Pompeii' in 2008 with keyboardist Dan Gregory while Simon went on to play guitar in alt-folk rock band 'elephant'.

=== Reformation: 2011–present ===
Following a string of drunken encounters at each other's weddings in the winter of 2010, the four founding members of The Shadow Project decided to put the past behind them and start writing new music together. The first rehearsal took place in May 2011, but it was swiftly followed by an offer to play a comeback show at the Norwich Arts Centre in October. Their first gig in four years (a sell-out), the band included four new songs in their set (alongside "Voices" and "Never Come Down" – both from the Voices EP). The following week they recorded a live session for the BBC and played a packed house at their favourite local – The Swan in Ipswich. In April 2012, they released "The Nature Boys" – their first studio recording since A Beauty To Fight For. The track will be followed by a new record which they are mixing.

In May 2012, The Shadow Project were approached by Sky Italia, who requested publishing rights to the track "Being Here (So Confusing)" for use in a new HD TV campaign to be aired in Italy.

=== Musical style ===
The Shadow Project fuse elements of indie, electronica, post-rock, dance, and ambient to create unique rock soundscapes. Vocoders, glitching, drum machines, loops, sampling, chiming guitars and heavy effects processing are characteristic of the band's sound. They have been influenced by the likes of Radiohead, The Cooper Temple Clause, Daft Punk and Brian Eno.

== Discography ==
Studio albums

- A Beauty To Fight For (2007)

EPs

- Objects Appear (2004)
- Voices (2005)
- The Tears in Their Eyes Brought Destruction to the Skies (2006)

== Sources ==
- "Welcome to wombatwombat.co.uk". Wombatwombat.co.uk.
- "// Drowned In Sound". DrownedInSound.com. Archived from the original on 1 August 2015.
- "Repeat new landing page". Repeatfanzine.co.uk.
- "BBC - Norfolk - Blast - Waterloo Park Walkabout 4". Bbc.co.uk.
- "The Shadow Project - A beauty to fight for - Plattentests.de-Rezension". Plattentests.de.
- "| RFB". Rockfeedback.com.
- "The Shadow Project สวยงาม ล้ำลึก !!!". Board.forindy.com.
- "The Shadow Project – A Beauty To Fight For | 山谷音乐". Valc.org.
- "The Shadow Project – A Beauty to Fight For". Dontstopdancing.wordpress.com. 15 July 2008.
- "Album: SHADOW PROJECT – A Beauty To Fight For (Nr One NR14 2007)". Dezji.wordpress.com. 12 February 2008.
