= Scriptures (band) =

US musical group

- Origin: Missoula, Montana
- Genres: ambient music post-rock metal psychedelic rock
- Occupation: Musical collective
- Instruments: bass, guitar, drums, Keyboards, samples
- Labels: The Lanthanide Series, Transligustic Other, Firefly Sessions
- Members: David Totten; Baine Craft; John Herman; Tyler Venture; Caleb Williams
- Past members: Casey Alexander; Jeff Forest; Jason Ward; Burke Jam; Scott Kennedy; Ben Rouner; Grier Phillips; Gary Jimmerson; Bob Martin
- Website: www.scripturesmusic.com

Scriptures is an instrumental collective from Seattle, Washington. The outfit performs ambient, post-rock music with a focus on layered melodies and shifting tones. The band formerly performed under the name This Is a Process of a Still Life.

== Origin ==
Formed in the Spring of 2003 as This Is a Process of a Still Life, the group included Jason Ward (bass), David Totten (guitar, keyboards), Scott Kennedy (guitar, keyboards), Baine Craft (percussion), and Jeff Forrest (guitar, keyboards). Other members include Ben Rouner (guitar, keyboards), Grier Phillips (rhodes, organ), Gary Jimmerson (percussion, melodica), Burke Jam (guitar, samples), and Bob Martin (percussion). During the fall of 2003, the unit began recording their first album in Portland, Oregon. Their follow-up record, Light, was recorded in 2005 in Missoula, Montana.

In 2006 the group relocated to Seattle Washington In 2009, the band has officially changed their name to Scriptures.

The band has toured the West Coast of the United States extensively and has shared stages with several notable acts including Xiu Xiu, Maserati, Tara Jane O'Neil (Papa M, The Sonora Pine, Retsin, Rodan), Cex, The Drift, Early Day Miners, Nice Nice, Earth, Cloud Cult, Pontiak, Pallbearer, and Bell Witch.

== Discography ==
=== Albums ===
as This Is A Process Of A Still Life:

1. This Is a Process of a Still Life (Firefly Sessions, 2004)
2. Light (Firefly Sessions, 2005)

as Scriptures:

1. Scriptures (Scriptures Records/Translinguistic Other, 2012)
2. The Hunters (The Lanthanide Series, 2013)
3. Incantations (The Lanthanide Series, 2016)
