= We Stood Like Kings =

Music band

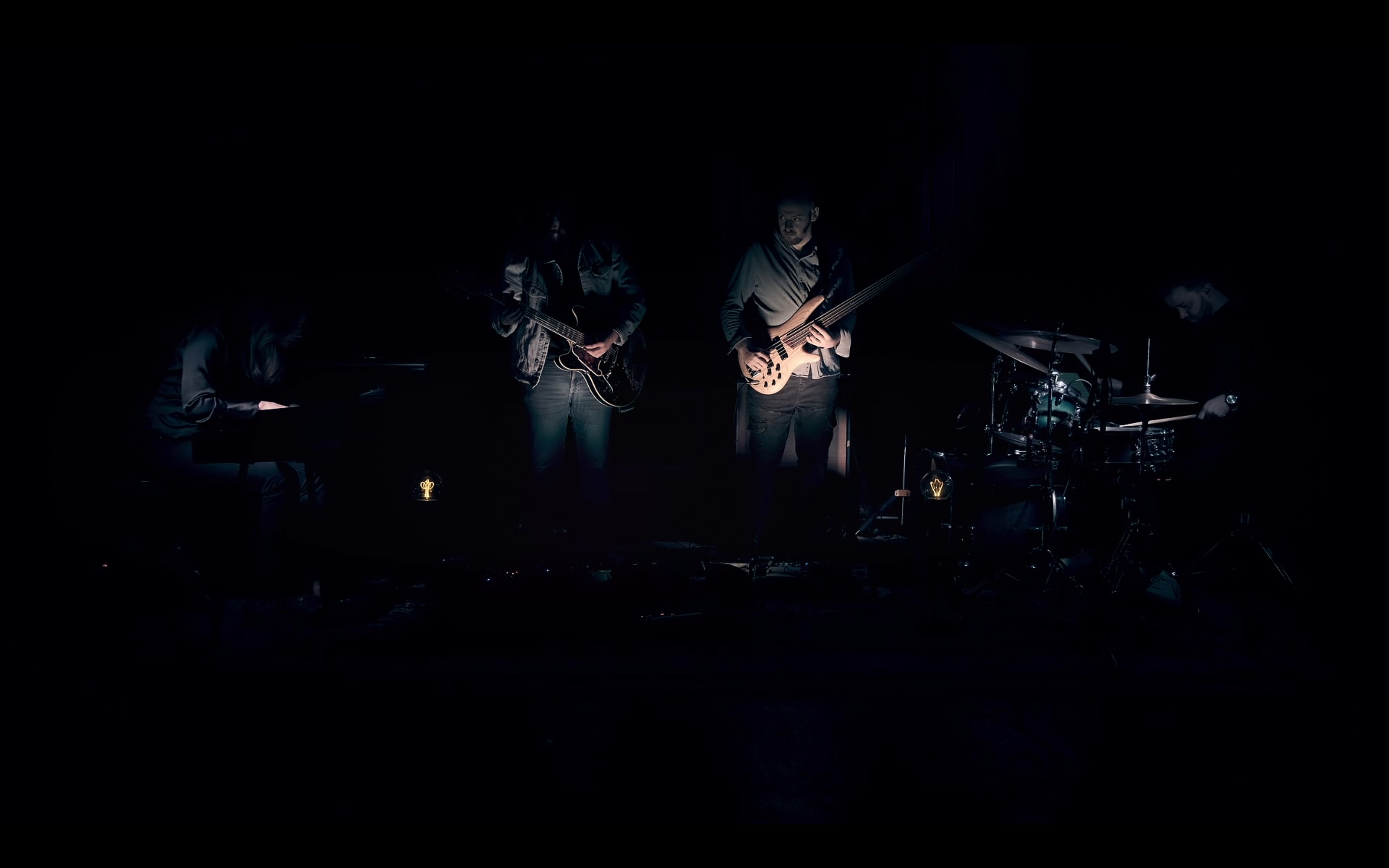
- We Stood Like Kings

Background information
- Origin: Brussels, Belgium
- Genres: Rock
- Label: Kapitän Platte
- Members: Judith Hoorens; Diego Di Vito; Colin Delloye; Lucas Vanderputten
- Past members: Mathieu Waterkeyn; Philip Bolten; Steven Van Isterdael; Marijn Cobbaert
- Website: www.westoodlikekings.com

We Stood Like Kings is an instrumental rock band formed in 2011 in Brussels, Belgium. They have released five full-length albums through the German label Kapitän Platte. Their purely instrumental music combines elements of post-rock, neoclassical rock, progressive rock with a prominent use of the piano. Their approach consists of mixing their own music with other art forms: silent cinema and classical music.

== Live scores ==
In 2014, the band released their first album Berlin 1927, conceived as a new score for the 1927 German silent documentary Berlin: Symphony of a Metropolis by Walther Ruttmann. Amongst others, the band performed the project at Dunk!festival in Zottegem, Belgium, RITCS School of Arts in Brussels, Belgium, Theater Aan Zee in Ostende, Belgium. "The contemplative dips and climactic surges of post-rock enhance the viewing experience.".

A year later in 2015, the band released their second album USSR 1926, conceived as a new score for the 1926 Soviet silent documentary A Sixth Part of the World by Dziga Vertov. The album was reviewed by online magazine Echoes And Dust as being "a masterpiece, incredible, consuming, tumultuous, visceral, and inspiring".

In 2017, the band released their third album USA 1982, conceived as a new score for the 1982 American movie Koyaanisqatsi by Godfrey Reggio. This project was premiered at BOZAR, the Palais des Beaux-Arts in Brussels and included in the Best Post-Rock Albums of 2017 list on Reddit. The track Night Owl was included on the Open Language compilation by American record label A Thousand Arms : "The track is an eerie post rock diatribe, haunting piano and faint electronics mingling with punchy drums to create one hell of an atmosphere."

In 2022, We Stood Like Kings released a new live soundtrack for the 2019 Latvian animated film Away by Gints Zilbalodis.

== Classical music ==
In 2020, the band put out their fourth album Classical Re:works with new arrangements of classical music from all eras including composers like Ludwig van Beethoven, Antonio Vivaldi, Johann Sebastian Bach, Maurice Ravel, Claude Debussy. "Classical Re:works has become a real showpiece", wrote the independent musical magazine Vinyl Keks.

== Side projects ==
- La Reine Seule

We Stood Like Kings's pianist Judith Hoorens released the piano solo album Visages (2022) under the monniker La Reine Seule.

- Chatte Royal

Chatte Royal is a math-rock band led by We Stood Like Kings's guitarist Diego Di Vito. They have released two EP's: Septembre (2020) and Petit Pansement (2022), and one album: Mick Torres Plays Too F***ing Loud (2024).

- Nouba Nouba

Nouba Nouba is an electro rock duo led by We Stood Like Kings's bassist Colin Delloye. They have released one EP: Oui (2024).

== Discography ==
=== Studio albums ===
- Away (2022)
- Classical Re:works (2020)
- USA 1982 (2017)
- USSR 1926 (2015)
- Berlin 1927 (2014)

== Members ==
=== Current ===
- Judith Hoorens – piano and synthesizer
- Diego Di Vito – guitars
- Colin Delloye – bass guitar
- Lucas Vanderputten – drums

=== Former ===
- Mathieu Waterkeyn – drums (2011–2021)
- Philip Bolten – guitars (2015–2021)
- Steven Van Isterdael – guitars (2011–2015)
- Marijn Cobbaert – bass guitar (2011–2013)

== See also ==
- List of post-rock bands
