= A Dog Called Ego =

German post rock musical group

- Origin: Hamburg, Germany
- Genres: Grungegaze,Post rock
- Years active: 2006–present
- Label: none
- Members: Christoph Härtwig; Dirk Bakker; Simon Janssen; Johannes Großer
- Past members: Marcel Habbe; Tim Grunwald; Gregor Kaißer
- Website: https://adogcalledego.bandcamp.com

A Dog Called Ego is a German post rock band from Hamburg, Germany formed in 2006 by Christoph Härtwig (guitar, vocals), Dirk Bakker (drums), Marcel Habbe (guitar, vocals) and Gregor Kaißer (bass guitar).

== History ==
Christoph Härtwig and Gregor Kaißer had already been playing together in several musical projects when they started working on musical material for a project that carried the working title "A DOG CALLED EGO." In early 2006 they decided to record an album and asked two friends, Marcel Habbe and Dirk Bakker, to join them for a recording. The project quickly turned into a real band and the band started playing live.

In Summer they recorded their debut album Living Seriously Damages Health in their own studio in Hamburg and it was described as the best alternative/Post Rock album of the last years by German Rock Hard Magazine. On the album, Chris Harms, the singer of the German gothic rock band Lord of the Lost, played cello for the song Something Huge.

After having played many concerts - including a two-week tour through Bosnia and Herzegowina- A Dog Called Ego started writing new musical material and started recording at their own Little Big Ears Studio in Hamburg/Germany. During the recording process, Marcel Habbe left the band due to personal reasons. In May 2011, A Dog Called Ego digitally released Happy Happy Apocalypse the second full-length record via Bandcamp, with physical copies being planned for later. Again, Chris Harms contributed some cello lines.

In summer 2012 the band released the Don't Vote For Us EP and were asked by Anathema to support them on their European tour. Thereafter, A Dog Called Ego locked down in their studio again to work on Songs For Elevators which was released on September 11, 2014.

After an 8 year hiatus, in December 2022 the band released the Null And Void EP, their first music in 10 years being joined by Tim Grunwald (Bass) and Simon Janssen (Guitar). Shortly after the EP was launched, A Dog Called Ego recorded their 4th studio album "Paper Boat", which was released on June 27, 2025. For recording they were joined by long time Friend Chris Aidonopoulos (Harmful, Rinderwahnsinn) on bass guitar just before Johannes Großer took over bass duties.

== Discography ==
- 2006: Living Seriously damages Health
- 2011: Happy Happy Apocalypse
- 2012: Don't Vote For Us - EP
- 2013: Songs For Elevators
- 2022: Null And Void - EP
- 2025: Paper Boat
