= Ef (band) =

Swedish post-rock band

EF
- Origin: Gothenburg, Sweden
- Genre: Post-rock
- Years active: 2003 – present
- Labels: Pelagic Records; And The Sound Records; Kapitän Platte; New Noise; Shelsmusic; Thomason Sounds
- Members: Niklas Åström; Tomas Torsson; Daniel Juline; Erik Jardestig; Kim Ruiz
- Past members: Mikael Hillergård; Alexander; Jonatan Råsmark Hammar; Claes Strängberg; Emanuel Olsson
- Website: www.efmusic.se

Ef (stylized as EF) is a post-rock band from Gothenburg, Sweden. Using little vocals, they feature a wide variety of instruments. Their debut album Give me beauty... Or give me death! was released in May 2006 on their own label And The Sound Records (ATS Records). They had several tours with around 400 shows in various European countries.

In February 2008, the band released their second album I Am Responsible (ATSR) and March 21, 2008, it was announced on their website that founding member and bass player Mikael Hillergård had left the band.

The band continued as a three piece and released their 3rd studio album Mourning Golden Morning (ATSR) in 2010. Same year they also started to cooperate with recently started record label Kapitän Platte based in Bielefeld, Germany who released all three albums on vinyl for the very first time.

This album also got the band to tour Russia, China, Taiwan and Hong Kong for the very first time.

In 2011, the live/touring band members Emanuel Olsson and Erik Jardestig (formerly Gustafsson) became steady members of the band and together they recorded the vinyl only EP Delusions of Grandeur for German record label Pelagic Records (2012).

In 2013, they released their 4th studio album Ceremonies (ATSR) including the song Delusions of Grandeur. This album became a milestone of the band and they toured China, Hong Kong and Taiwan for the second time. Also a massive 4 week tour through most parts of Europe.

The second Pelagic Records EP was released in 2016 which was a split with Israeli band Tiny Fingers and named Vayu. The main song of EF was Hiraeth which also got a video directed by Eric Ivar Persson and included an early performance by Swedish actor Alexander Abdallah.

During the release of this EP the original member Daniel Juline (formerly Öhman) decided to leave the band and focus on private life and slowly the band started to fade out but never breaking up.

== Discography ==
- Give Me Beauty... Or Give Me Death! (LP, 2006)
- I Am Responsible (LP, 2008)
- Mourning Golden Morning (LP, 2010)
- Delusions of Grandeur (EP, 2012)
- Ceremonies (LP, 2013)
- Vāyu (EP, 2016)
- We Salute You, You and You! (LP, 2022)
- Live at Dunk!Festival 2023 (LP, 2024)
- Give Me Beauty... Or Give Me Death! – 20th Anniversary Edition (LP, 2025)

== Members ==
- Niklas Åström – drums (2003–present)
- Tomas Torsson – guitar, vocals (2003–present)
- Daniel Juline (né Öhman) – guitar, keyboards, bass, vocals (2003–2006, 2010–present)
- Erik Jardestig (né Gustafsson) – guitar (2011–present)
- Kim Ruiz – bass (2023–present)

== Past members ==
- Mikael Hillergård – bass (2003–2008)
- Alexander – (2005)
- Jonatan Råsmark Hammar – cello, guitar (2006–2009; 2013 guest)
- Claes Strängberg – guitar, vocals (2008–2009)
- Emanuel Olsson – bass (2011–2018)

== See also ==
- List of post-rock bands
