= Stuck on Planet Earth =

Canadian alternative rock trio

Stuck On Planet Earth
- Origin: Vaughan, Ontario, Canada
- Genres: Rock, alternative rock
- Years active: 2007–present
- Label: Anthem Records
- Members: Al Capo; Adam Bianchi; Andrew Testa

Stuck On Planet Earth is a Canadian three piece alternative rock band from Vaughan, Ontario, consisting of Adam Bianchi (vocals and guitar), Al Capo (vocals and bass), and Andrew Testa (drums).

They formed in 2007 and have released four EPs and seven singles, with their release "Play Along" charting on the Canadian iTunes Alternative charts. Stuck On Planet Earth has received national and international radio play through The Verge (XM). In May 2013, Stuck On Planet Earth released their single "Better", which charted at #40 on the Canadian rock/alternative chart.

The music video for "Better" premiered on Exclaim!. In October 2013, it was announced by Aquarian Weekly that Stuck On Planet Earth would embark on their first US east coast tour, and to much success they were received well by fans and music critics alike.

In November 2013, Stuck On Planet Earth released their single "Fast Forward", produced by Flashlight Brown alumni Fil Bucchino. The music video for "Fast Forward" premiered on Exclaim!.

The single was picked up by The Verge (XM) and CBC Radio 3, and debuted on The R3-30 at #1 on November 29, 2013. "Fast Forward" remained in the #1 position on the CBC Radio 3 The R3-30 countdown until January 31, 2014.

Subsequently, "Fast Forward" was also featured on the 'Plays of the Week' segment on the NHL Network (Canada) on November 25, 2013. In February 2014, Vice (magazine) profiled the band as a new and emerging act to watch out for. In September 2015, Stuck was added to Riot Fest in Toronto, alongside Weezer, Motörhead, Alexisonfire, Eagles of Death Metal, and Against Me!. Subsequently, after their Riot Fest debut, Stuck On Planet Earth's single "Use Me" premiered on CFNY-FM 102.1 The Edge. In May 2015, Stuck On Planet Earth opened for Scott Weiland and the Wildabouts at the Mod Club Theatre in Toronto for Canadian Music Week.

During 2015, Stuck On Planet Earth opened for Scott Weiland, Finger Eleven, Gob, and SWMRS. In 2016, Stuck On Planet Earth played SXSW and toured North America extensively. On December 6, 2016, Stuck On Planet Earth's music video for their song "Forgot My Name" premiered on Aux (TV channel).

In April 2018, the band signed an exclusive record deal with Anthem Records.

On June 26, 2020, Stuck On Planet Earth released their debut album Beautiful Nowhere via Anthem Records. Beautiful Nowhere was given positive reviews, and subsequently their debut single from the album "Higher Than The Drugs" entered the Canadian mainstream rock billboard charts.
