= Tracer AMC =

- Origin: Northern Ireland, United Kingdom
- Genres: Post-rock
- Labels: We Love Records; Thomason Sounds; Errol Records
- Members: Jonny Ashe; Alex Donald; Michael Kinloch; Keith Winter

Tracer AMC is a Northern-Irish post-rock band formed in Bangor, Northern Ireland in 1999. The band consists of:

- Jonny Ashe (Guitar)
- Alex Donald (Bass)
- Michael Kinloch (Guitar)
- Keith Winter (Drums)

== History ==
Tracer AMC were formed in Bangor in 1999 by Jonny Ashe and Alex Donald, who were joined quickly by Keith Winter. Michael Kinloch joined in 2001.

=== A Song For Amber and Red ===
Tracer AMC gained moderate popularity in 2000 when their double A-side 7" single "Song for Amber and Red" was played occasionally by John Peel.

=== Pelican ===
In 2001 Tracer AMC recorded a follow-up, another 7" single called the Pelican E.P. It was released by Errol Records, and was reviewed favourably by Drowned in Sound ("magical") and Record Collector ("brilliant"). One of the b-sides, Elmwood Avenue, went on to feature on a number of compilation albums, including the annual Belfest CD (2002) and collections by Liberty Blue (2003) and Ballroom of Romance (2003).

=== Flux & Form ===
In 2004, Tracer AMC released their first album, Flux & Form. A co-release between Errol Records and We Love Records, The Wire said of Flux & Form "the group [display] an impressive mastery of the epic."

=== 12" E.P. ===
Flux & Form was followed in June 2005 by a 12" E.P., featuring new tracks In Rivers and The Russian Threat, and two alternative versions of Blue Thread.

=== Islands ===
The band's second full-length collection, Islands, was released on We Love Records in late 2005. It was quickly picked up by Thomason Sounds, and re-packaged and re-released in Japan.

== BBC Sessions ==
The band have recorded three sessions for the BBC. In 2003, for Across the Line on Radio Ulster they recorded Flux & Form, Nineteen, Copenhagen, and a cover of The Shadows' "Apache" (retitled "I'm an Apache, You're an Aeroplane, I Don't Think We Stand A Chance"). The next year, in session for Radio 1's Session in Northern Ireland, they recorded Flux & Form, Some Electric, The Russian Threat, and a cover of The Jesus & Mary Chain's Just Like Honey. In 2005, the band recorded two new versions of "Blue Thread" for the Tom Robinson show on BBC 6 Music.

== Live shows ==
Tracer AMC have toured intermittently in the UK, and in 2006 toured Japan with labelmates Miaou. Amongst others, Tracer AMC have played shows with Cinerama, Fugazi, Spiritualized, The Album Leaf, 65 Days of Static, June of 44, Windsor for the Derby, Oceansize, The Lapse, Six by Seven, and toe. In 2007, Kerrang! magazine said: "Tracer AMC, returned from a successful jaunt across Japan, show the hometown crowd how they’ve won Tokyo’s heart. Immediately more developed and daring, they skip through movements in four songs that need no lyrics to augment an accomplished grace." Stuart Bailie of NME once said "the music sounds holy and true".

== Future ==
A third album, recorded in 2007, is yet to be released.

== Discography ==
=== Albums ===
- Flux & Form (2004)
- Islands (2005)

=== E.P.s ===
- Song for Amber and Red (2000)
- Pelican (2001)
- In Rivers (2005)
