= Platon Karataev =

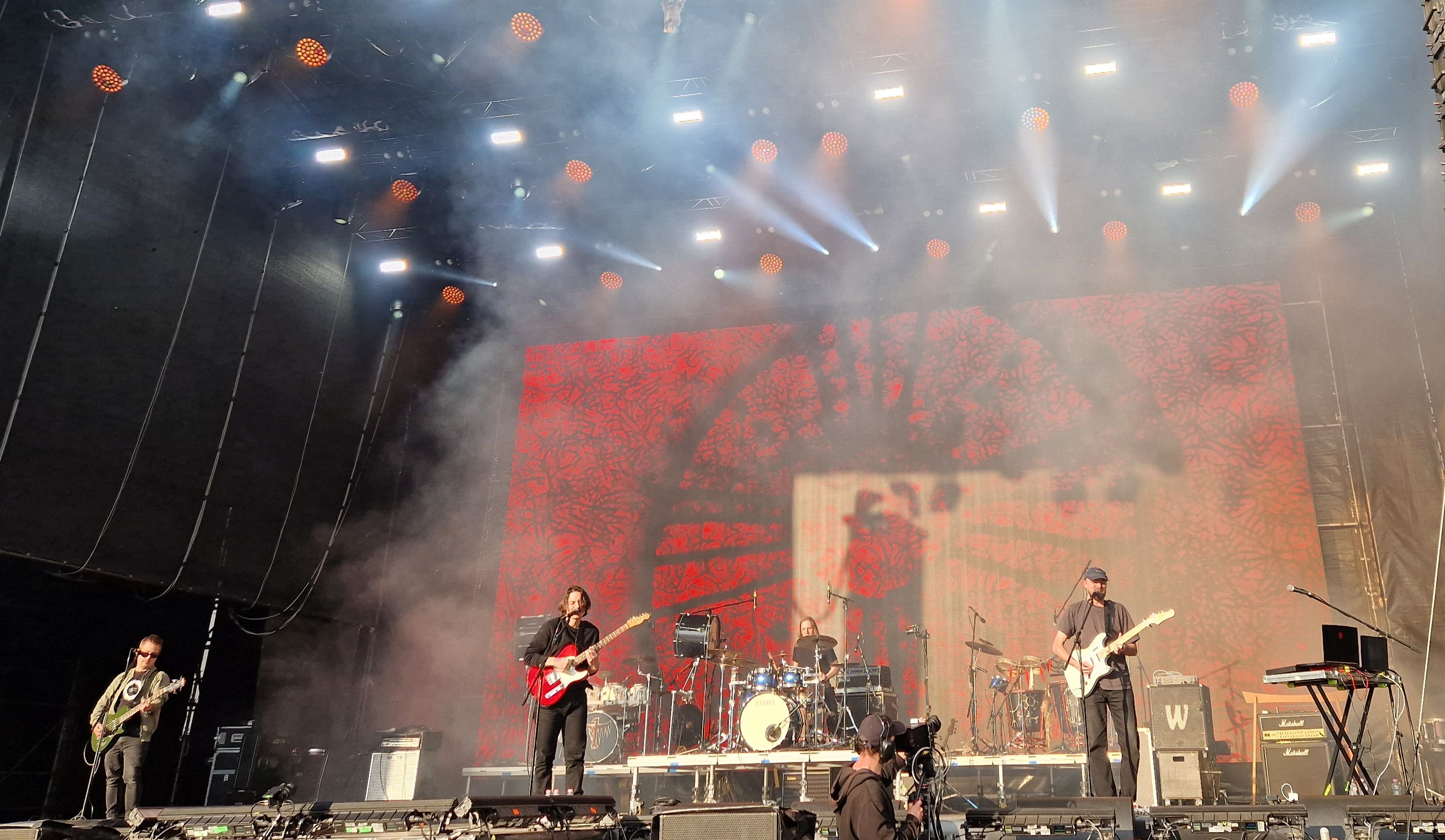
- Live in Budapest Park, 2025

Background information
- Origin: Budapest, Hungary
- Genres: Indie rock, folk rock Indie folk (earlier) alternative folk post-rock (later)
- Years active: 2013–present
- Website: platonkarataev.com

Platon Karataev is a Hungarian musical group.

Their music draws from spiritual traditions, including Gregorian chants, mantras, and folk songs. The band's lyrics are in English and Hungarian. The band is named after a character from Leo Tolstoy's novel.

== History ==
Platon Karataev formed in Budapest in 2016.

Their first single "Elevator" (2016) and first album For Her (2017) made them one of the most streamed Hungarian music artists known domestically and globally.

In 2018, they took part in Zandari Festa (South Korea) event. In 2019, the band performed at other festivals, including Waves Vienna (Austria), Reeperbahn Festival (Germany), and Liverpool Sound City (UK) festivals.

In 2021, Kultura.hu named them "the most exportable" Hungarian music artist.

In March 2022, they gave an interview to major Hungarian news magazine HVG. The band performed at the Roadburn Festival (Netherlands) in April the same year.

In 2023, the band received the Hungarian Music Awards.

Platon Karataev performed at Sziget Festival in 2024 and 2025.

== Lineup ==
- Gergely Balla — guitar, vocals
- Sebestyén Czakó-Kuraly — guitar, vocals
- László Sallai — bass guitar
- Zsombor Farkas — drums

== Albums ==
=== English period ===
- For Her (2017)
- Atoms (2020)

=== Hungarian period ===
- Partért kiáltó (lit. 'Shouting to the Shore', 2022)
- Napkötöző (lit. 'Sunbound', 2025)

== Awards and nominations ==
=== Berlin Music Video Awards ===
The Berlin Music Video Awards is an international festival that promotes the art of music videos.

| Year | Nominated work | Award | Result | Ref. |
|---|---|---|---|---|
| 2026 | "Three Cycles" | Best Experimental | Nominated | |
