= The Timeout Drawer =

US musical group

- Also known as: Timeout Drawer
- Origin: Chicago, Illinois, U.S.
- Genre: Post-rock
- Years active: 1999–present
- Labels: Someoddpilot Records; Chocolate Industries; The Consumers Research & Development Label
- Members: Chris Eichenseer; Jason Goldberg; Jon Slusher; Chris Van Pelt

The Timeout Drawer was an American post-rock band from Chicago, Illinois, formed in 1999. The last known lineup consisted of Chris Eichenseer, Jason Goldberg, Jon Slusher and Andy Bosnak.

== Members ==
=== Most recent members ===
- Chris Eichenseer – drums
- Jason Goldberg – keyboards, synthesizer
- Jon Slusher – guitar, vocals
- Andy Bosnak – guitar, bass guitar

=== Past members ===
- Ray Dybzinski - guitar
- Chris Van Pelt - guitar
- Jef Green - guitar

== Discography ==
=== Studio albums ===
- Record of Small Histories (2000)
- A Difficult Future (2001)
- Nowonmai (2005)

=== EPs ===
- Presents Left for the Living Dead (2003)
- Alone (2006)

=== Singles ===
- "Terrible Secrets Revealed for an Instant by a Flash of Lightning" (2003)
- "The Exorcist" (2005)
