= Riverbeds (band) =

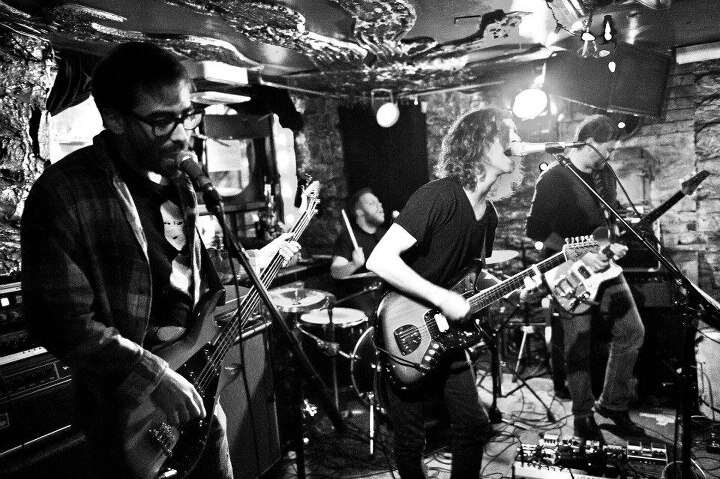
- L to R: Alexandre, Charles, Vincent and Fred of Riverbeds performing in Montréal. (Copyright: Mathieu Coudé mathieucoude.com)

Background information
- Origin: Montreal, Quebec, Canada
- Genres: Post-rock, indie rock, emo, post-hardcore
- Years active: 2010–present
- Website: diveintoriverbeds.com

Riverbeds is a Canadian post-rock/emo band from Montreal, Quebec formed in 2010. The band made its recording debut in 2012 with the EP Hiding Small Things in Obvious Places which was released on November 24 at Panda Bar. Riverbeds musical style has been described by Indecent Xposure as being influenced by "Thrice, The Almost and Circa Survive amongst others". The band shared the stage with both local and international bands, including Daylight (now Superheaven), Tyler Daniel Bean, and Stuck On Planet Earth.

In March 2014, it was announced that Riverbeds will be playing Pouzza Fest on a bill including The Swellers, The Hotelier, and Christie Front Drive. The show took place on May 17, 2014.

The work on their second EP began in 2014 while still playing shows in and around the Montreal area. The album title What You Keep Close was announced in December with a release date of February 5, 2015, for both physical and digital copies.

Following two previous EP, the band decided to write enough material to go on what would be their first full-length album. CARE was released on June 20, 2019.

== Band members ==
- Alexandre Duhamel Gingras – bass, backing vocals
- Charles-André Chamard – drums, lead vocals
- Fred Béland – guitar, backing vocals
- Vincent Pigeon – lead vocals, guitar

== Discography ==
=== LP ===
- CARE (2019)

=== EP ===
- Hiding Small Things in Obvious Places (2012)
- What You Keep Close (2015)

=== Single ===
- "Removing The Head (Or Destroying The Brain)"/"End of the World" (2011)
