= Way Station (band) =

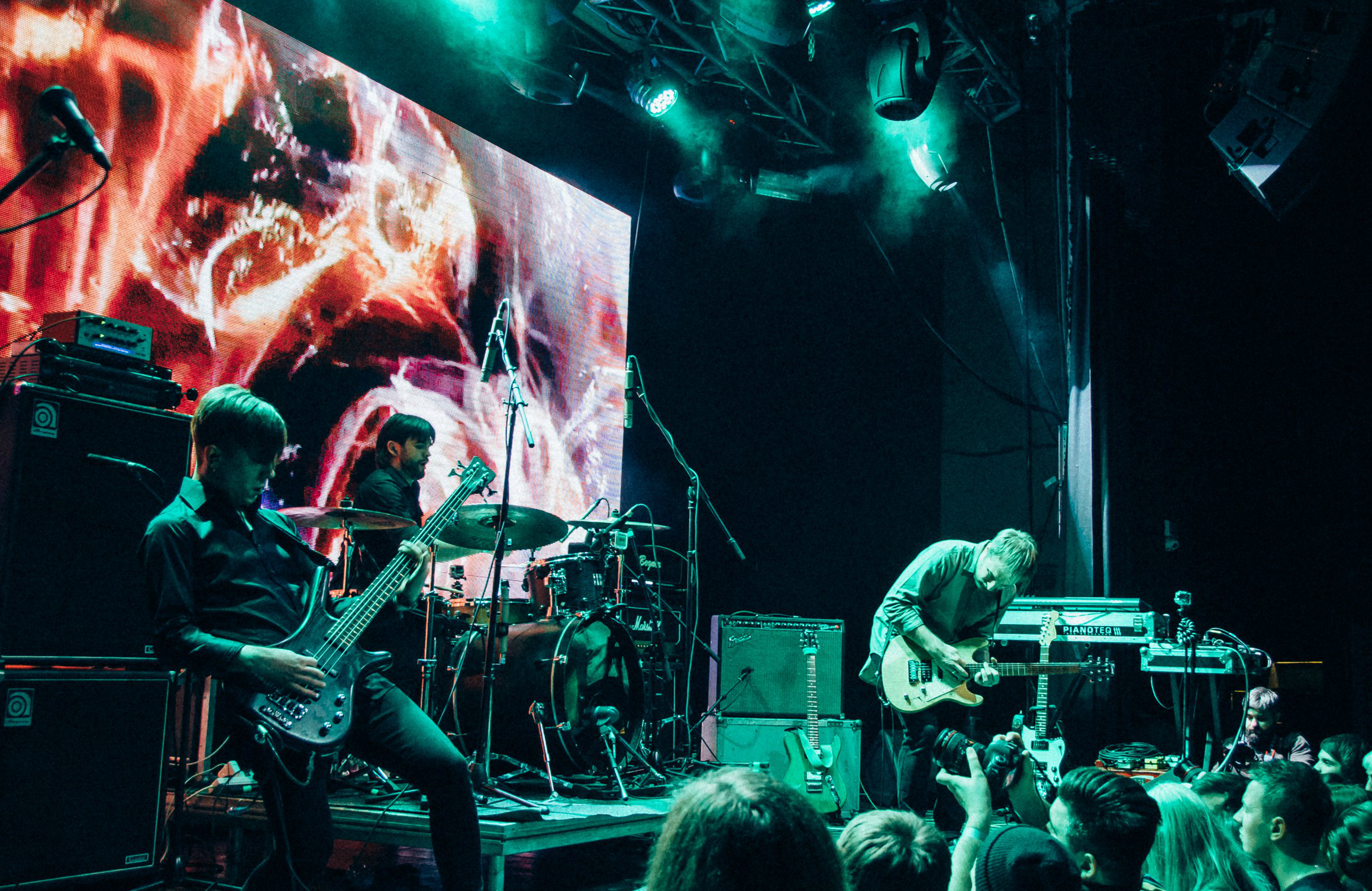
- Way Station in Atlas Club (Kyiv 29 February 2016)

Background information
- Origin: Kyiv, Ukraine
- Genres: Post-rock, post-metal, instrumental, alternative
- Years active: 2010–present
- Labels: Independent, AZH Promo
- Members: Nikita Yudin; Vitalii Yermak; Artem Kryvenko
- Past members: Vasiliy Starshinov; Andrii Zakharov; Evhen Mikhaylich
- Website: waystation.com.ua

Way Station is Ukrainian post-rock, post-metal band formed in 2010 by Nikita Yudin.

The musical style of the band has been described as instrumental rock, post-rock or post-metal. Their works are often compared to the bands God Is an Astronaut and Maybeshewill. In live performances the band uses visuals for each song, and Nikita sometimes uses the violin bow while playing the guitar.

The present members of the band are: Nikita Yudin (guitar), Denis Shvets (drums), Artem Kryvenko (bass guitar).

== History ==
The starting point of the band's history was 2005. At that time Nikita was studying at the Dnipropetrovsk Conservatory of M. Glinka and playing in a band of his conservatory mates. Guys applied for the competition of young bands "Слухай Чернігівське" and as for the name of the band Nikita used the title of his childhood's favorite book "Пересадочная Станция" (originally "Way Station") by Clifford D. Simak. Participation in the contest had success : the band entered the top ten and the song "Зима" got into the "Слухай Чернігівське" collection released on CD by the local radio station. Later the name of the band was changed to "Way Station" like it is originally in the book.

In 2009 Nikita moved to Kyiv and started searching new musicians. This was the second stage of team's formation. In 2011 with the updated band membership (Vitalii Yermak (drums) and a session musician Viktor Rayevsky (bass guitar) the band supports Maybeshewill in Kyiv. It was their first show with the name "Way Station". Soon the place of the bass guitarist takes Vasiliy Starshinov who has already played with Nikita in Dnepropetrovsk. In 2013 the band releases their first single "Road", then "Last Launch" and the first album "The Ships" released 27 November in 2013 on CD by Ukrainian label "AZH Promo". At the end of 2014 the band releases single "2 Million Light Years" available for free download and only in digital format. This single included an experimental b-side : "And They Will Not Learn Warfare Anymore".

During its existence the band shared stage with the bands such as This Will Destroy You and Lymbyc Systym. Also Way Station played a few shows with Maybeshewill including their last show in Kyiv in February 2016 before disbanding.

In 2016, Artem Kryvenko is taking Vasiliy Starshinov's place as a guitarist and bass guitarist.

== Discography ==
=== Albums ===
- 2013 – The Ships
- 2018 – The Way of Minstrel

=== Singles ===
- 2013 – "Road"
- 2013 – "Last Launch"
- 2014 – "2 Million Light Years"

=== Miscellaneous ===
- 2015 – "Silent" (a peculiar cover of "Silent Night". It was released by the band on 25 December in 2015 as a Christmas present for the audience. After a while it was removed from the net.)

== Additional information ==
- In the song "The Heaven and the Earth" from the album "The Ships" is used the speech of the American space mission Apollo 8 crew. On 24 December 1968 the crew of Apollo 8 read in turn from the Book of Genesis as they orbited the Moon. Bill Anders, Jim Lovell, and Frank Borman recited verses 1 through 10.
- The name of the b-side "And They Will Not Learn Warfare Anymore" from the single "2 Million Light Years" – is taken from the inscription on the UN building in Washington, which, in turn, is taken from the Bible – The Book of Isaiah 2:4
