= Beware of Safety =

American instrumental post-rock band

- Origin: Los Angeles, California, United States
- Genres: Post-rock, post-metal, instrumental rock
- Years active: 2005–present
- Labels: The Mylene Sheath, Friend of Mine
- Members: Adam Kay; Jeff Zemina; Morgan Hendry; Steve Molter; Tad Piecka
- Website: bewareofsafety.com

Beware of Safety, commonly abbreviated as BoS, is an instrumental post-rock band from Los Angeles, California. The band plays sprawling, instrumental rock that could be classified as post-metal, post-rock, and even math rock. Beware of Safety has six official releases in its catalog: It Is Curtains (2007), dogs (2009), Giants/BoS Split 7" (2011), Leaves/Scars (2011), Lotusville (2014), and Mabon (2015). The band has released albums with The Mylene Sheath in the USA as well as Friend of Mine Records in Japan and has toured throughout the USA and Europe highlighted by performances with Caspian, El Ten Eleven, If These Trees Could Talk, Té, sleepmakeswaves, Maserati, The American Dollar and Junius, among others.

The band has received a notable amount of press for their album dogs, including a write-up in Wired Magazine's Sunday Soundtracking.

In early 2009, Tad Piecka joined BoS on bass, expanding the band to five members.

The creation of 2011's Leaves/Scars was a tumultuous time for BoS with members contemplating quitting the band.

Beware of Safety's 2014 album Lotusville reflects the band's experiences living in Los Angeles, California.

Member Morgan Hendry is also an engineer at Jet Propulsion Lab.

== Members ==
- Adam Kay - Guitar
- Jeff Zemina - Guitar
- Morgan Hendry - Drums, Keyboards
- Steve Molter - Guitar
- Tad Piecka - Bass

== Discography ==
=== Albums ===
- dogs - (CD/LP, The Mylene Sheath, 2009)
- Leaves/Scars - (CD/LP, The Mylene Sheath, 2011)
- Lotusville - (CD/LP, 2014)
- Mabon - (CD/LP, 2015)

=== EPs ===
- It Is Curtains - (CD/LP, The Mylene Sheath, 2007)
- Mabon - (digital release, 2015 / LP, dunk!records, 2020)
