= EndSerenading =

Studio album by Mineral
- Released: August 25, 1998
- Genre: Emo-rock
- Length: 47:33
- Label: Crank!

Mineral chronology
The Power of Failing (1997)	EndSerenading (1998)

Professional ratings
Review scores
Source	Rating
AllMusic	2.5/5 stars
The Encyclopedia of Popular Music	3/5 stars
Pitchfork	7.4/10 (1998); 7.6/10 (2014)

EndSerenading is the second and final studio album by Mineral, released on August 25, 1998, after the band had broken up.

== Background and recording ==
According to frontman Chris Simpson, as a result of their time playing as band after the release of their debut The Power of Failing, the members of Mineral had developed as players and had "a little more experience in knowing what sounds we were interested in getting" and what gear they wanted to use. By the time they began writing songs for EndSerenading, according to Simpson, the band were "interested in doing something that wasn't as reliant on quiet-loud dynamics" as their previous album. During the album's writing and recording process, Simpson was particularly influenced by such bands as Low, Red House Painters, and Bedhead.

Mineral initially recorded basic tracks for the album before leaving on tour. Six months later, the band was coming to an end, and Simpson decided to finish the album, and recorded most of the vocals and additional guitar tracks knowing it would be the band's last release. Simpson saw this as an opportunity to experiment with layered vocals since he would not have to replicate it live.

The album saw Simpson incorporate more religious themes and imagery in the lyrics, which the singer ascribes to his questioning whether he "believed the same things spiritually as my parents or churches I have gone to growing up."

Simpson and Gomez formed The Gloria Record, while McCarver and Wiley formed Imbroco.

== Music ==
The album was noted for its overall softer and quieter sound in comparison to the band's former album, The Power of Failing, which featured much louder and more energetic pieces. AllMusic said the album's sound was "nearly identical" to The Power of Failing.

== Reception and legacy ==
Blake Butler of AllMusic gave the album two and a half stars out of five. He wrote: "[EndSerenading] gives Mineral's rather large fan following something to remember them by -- although it somehow seems that the memory would have been more precious without this release. This is easily a disappointment; nevertheless, many who loved Mineral will not be able to help themselves from falling for this last release, and it will probably bring them quite a few more admirers who never paid attention before."

In 2017, Mineral accused rapper Gab3 and Lil Peep of plagiarism over an unlicensed and uncredited sample of the track "LoveLetterTypewriter" on their track "Hollywood Dreaming". Gab3 stated that the sample was meant to honor Mineral's work. Chris Simpson has expressed regret over how the band handled the situation, but also stated that, "I think it's absolutely fair to say, 'you should credit people when you've taken things from them.' It's not like we were gonna sue him or ask him for money, it was a matter of principle for us. And it wasn't a small sample: It was the backbone of the song and there were snippets of vocals that came in at the end. That’s all — if you're inspired by it and that's why you’re using it, then why not tell people?"

== Track listing ==
1. "LoveLetterTypewriter" – 3:45
2. "Palisade" – 4:31
3. "Gjs" – 4:46
4. "Unfinished" – 6:07
5. "ForIvadell" – 3:36
6. "WakingToWinter" – 4:02
7. "ALetter" – 4:53
8. "SoundsLikeSunday" – 5:20
9. "&serenading" – 5:24
10. "TheLastWordIsRejoice" – 5:09
