= The Vehicle Birth =

Former rock band

- Origin: Fairfax, Virginia, U.S.
- Years active: 1993–1999
- Labels: Crank!
- Members: Leigh Thompson; John Stephens; Christopher Jackson; Jeffrey Galusha; Timothy James

The Vehicle Birth (VB) was a rock band that performed and recorded between January 1993 and May 1999.

== Biography ==
The Vehicle Birth began performing at venues such as the Dharma Coffeehouse and The Music Store in Fairfax, Virginia. During this period, they regularly played shows with The Dismemberment Plan and recorded several times with Travis Morrison. In 1994, the group relocated to Boston, Massachusetts. The band brought their DIY techniques and math rock influences to Boston, which helped fuel a math rock boon in the Western Massachusetts area that included bands such as Dagobah, Glans, Robots, Phalen/Moore Trio, and Lynx. However, Chris Jackson, the band's guitarist, said the band themselves did not consider their music "mathy." In 1997, the band shared a loft with Christina Files from Swirlies.

The Boston Globe described their live shows as “volatile and expressive.” Preferring not to use set lists and often improvising lyrics and song transitions on stage, their performances were intentionally spontaneous. Vocalist Tim Schneider has described his approach as “making up most of what [he] sings on the spot.” Rather than working in traditional studios, Vehicle Birth preferred recording on a four-track in a basement setting to preserve the immediacy of their sound. Their style has been likened to experimental rock acts such as Slint, with drummer Jeff Galusha stating that “the best thing a band can be called these days is smart… smart enough to do something different.”

A 1996 session recorded in Rhode Island was self-released as an LP titled Tragedy in early 1997. Crank! Records re-released the album in 1998, allowing for broader distribution. The LP gained moderate success, receiving college radio airplay, reaching number 24 on the CMJ charts, and charting in The Gavin Report during the summer of 1998. The band toured extensively across the United States. Ongoing touring efforts proved to be taxing, and the band disbanded in 1999 after playing their final show in Portland, Oregon.

The Vehicle Birth reunited in 2011 for two performances in Virginia: one on March 19 at Galaxy Hut in Arlington and another at the Dharma Coffeehouse in Fairfax.

== Band members ==
- Leigh Thompson – guitar, keyboards, clarinet, backing vocals
- John Stephens – bass
- Christopher Jackson – guitar
- Jeffrey Galusha – drums
- Timothy James – vocals, guitar

== Touring partners ==
The band toured with the following other music artists.

- A Minor Forest
- Archers of Loaf
- At the Drive-In
- Burning Airlines
- Dagobah
- Dambuilders
- Eggs
- The Elevator Drops
- Thee Hydrogen Terrors
- Faraquet
- The For Carnation
- Gang of Four
- Green Magnet School
- The Jose Fist
- Jawbox
- Jejune
- Jetpack
- Karate
- Kramer
- Les Savy Fav
- The Control Group / The Doosies
- Piebald
- Pitchblende
- Quintaine Americana
- The Regrets
- Robots
- The Dismemberment Plan
- The Transmegetti
- Sunday's Best
- Smart Went Crazy
- Smearcase
- Six Going on Seven
- Slant Six
- Sweep the Leg Johnny
- Tristeza
- Tsunami
- Victory at Sea
- The Wicked Farleys
- Young Astronauts Club

== Discography ==
- Tragedy (1997, self-release; 1998, Crank! reissue) (prod. Keith Souza)

Allmusic (link)
Baby Sue (link)

Tragedy by The Vehicle Birth (1997)
No.	Title	Length
1.	"Crackfarm"
2.	"We Need to Find the Girls"
3.	"Marathon"
4.	"Sideshow"
5.	"Lifehighschool"
6.	"The Leaders of Pursuit"
7.	"Yankeedom"
8.	"Daycap"
9.	"One Mississippi"
10.	"23"
11.	"The Discovery of Oxygen"

- "Limousine" b/w "Zero Work", "Amsterdam" 7" (Lit)
- split single w/The Wicked Farleys (1999, Doom Nibbler) (song: "Toronto")
- various artists: They Came from Massachusetts (Big Wheel Recreation) (song: "Coltrane")
