= Paul Poirier =

Canadian ice dancer (born 1991)

- Poirier in 2026

Personal information
- Born: November 6, 1991 (age 35) Ottawa, Ontario, Canada
- Home town: Unionville, Ontario, Canada
- Height: 1.74 m (5 ft 9 in)

Figure skating career
- Country: Canada
- Discipline: Ice dance
- Partner: Piper Gilles (since 2011); Vanessa Crone (2001–2011)
- Coach: Carol Lane; Juris Razgulajevs; Jon Lane
- Skating club: Scarboro Figure Skating Club
- Began skating: 1996
- Highest WS: 3rd (2020–21)

Medal record
Event	Gold medal – first place	Silver medal – second place	Bronze medal – third place
Olympic Games	0	0	1
World Championships	0	3	2
Four Continents Championships	2	2	2
Grand Prix Final	1	0	2
Canadian Championships	6	7	2
World Junior Championships	0	1	0
Medal list
Olympic Games
Bronze medal – third place	2026 Milano Cortina	Ice dance
World Championships
Silver medal – second place	2024 Montreal	Ice dance
Silver medal – second place	2025 Boston	Ice dance
Silver medal – second place	2026 Prague	Ice dance
Bronze medal – third place	2021 Stockholm	Ice dance
Bronze medal – third place	2023 Saitama	Ice dance
Four Continents Championships
Gold medal – first place	2024 Shanghai	Ice dance
Gold medal – first place	2025 Seoul	Ice dance
Silver medal – second place	2014 Taipei	Ice dance
Silver medal – second place	2020 Seoul	Ice dance
Bronze medal – third place	2011 Taipei	Ice dance
Bronze medal – third place	2019 Anaheim	Ice dance
Grand Prix Final
Gold medal – first place	2022–23 Turin	Ice dance
Bronze medal – third place	2010–11 Beijing	Ice dance
Bronze medal – third place	2023–24 Beijing	Ice dance
Canadian Championships
Gold medal – first place	2011 Victoria	Ice dance
Gold medal – first place	2020 Mississauga	Ice dance
Gold medal – first place	2022 Ottawa	Ice dance
Gold medal – first place	2024 Calgary	Ice dance
Gold medal – first place	2025 Laval	Ice dance
Gold medal – first place	2026 Gatineau	Ice dance
Silver medal – second place	2009 Saskatoon	Ice dance
Silver medal – second place	2010 London	Ice dance
Silver medal – second place	2013 Mississauga	Ice dance
Silver medal – second place	2015 Kingston	Ice dance
Silver medal – second place	2016 Halifax	Ice dance
Silver medal – second place	2018 Vancouver	Ice dance
Silver medal – second place	2019 Saint John	Ice dance
Bronze medal – third place	2012 Moncton	Ice dance
Bronze medal – third place	2017 Ottawa	Ice dance
World Junior Championships
Silver medal – second place	2008 Sofia	Ice dance

Paul Poirier (French pronunciation: [pɔl pwa.ʁje]; born November 6, 1991) is a Canadian ice dancer. Competing with Piper Gilles, he is the 2026 Winter Olympics bronze medalist, a five-time World medallist, a two-time Four Continents champion (2024–25), and the 2022–23 Grand Prix Final champion, an eight-time ISU Grand Prix gold medallist, and five-time Canadian national champion (2020, 2022, 2024–26). Gilles and Poirier competed for Canada at the 2018, 2022, and 2026 Winter Olympics.

With earlier partner Vanessa Crone, he is the 2010 Grand Prix Final bronze medallist, 2011 Four Continents bronze medallist, 2008 World Junior silver medallist, and 2011 Canadian national champion. Crone and Poirier competed for Canada at the 2010 Winter Olympics.

== Personal life ==
Paul Poirier was born November 6, 1991, in Ottawa, Ontario, to Debra Mendes de Franca and Marc Poirier. He attended high school at École secondaire Étienne-Brûlé. In 2015, he graduated from the University of Toronto with a Bachelor of Arts in linguistics. He continues graduate studies in linguistics part-time. He speaks English, French, Japanese, and Spanish. His brother played in the Ontario Hockey League.

Poirier is gay and has spoken about "perhaps [being] a role model for...younger queer athletes."

== Career ==
=== Early years ===
Poirier began learning to skate in 1996. Early in his career, he competed in single skating, in addition to ice dancing and pair skating with Vanessa Crone. The two began skating together in May 2001.

As ice dancers, Crone/Poirier made their ISU Junior Grand Prix (JGP) debut in September 2005, placing seventh in Andorra. The following season, they took bronze at the 2006 JGP in Norway before winning the national junior title at the 2007 Canadian Championships. The duo placed ninth at the 2007 World Junior Championships.

=== 2007–2008 season: World Junior silver ===
Crone/Poirier won gold at both of their JGP assignments and qualified to the JGP Final, where they finished fourth. Competing in the senior ranks, they placed fourth at the 2008 Canadian Championships. They capped off their season with silver at the 2008 World Junior Championships.

=== 2008–2009 season ===
Making their senior Grand Prix debut, Crone/Poirier won silver at the 2008 Skate Canada and placed fourth at the 2008 Trophée Éric Bompard. After winning silver behind Virtue/Moir at the 2009 Canadian Championships, they competed at the 2009 Four Continents Championships in Vancouver, placing fourth. They finished twelfth at the 2009 World Championships in Los Angeles, California.

=== 2009–2010 season: Vancouver Olympics ===
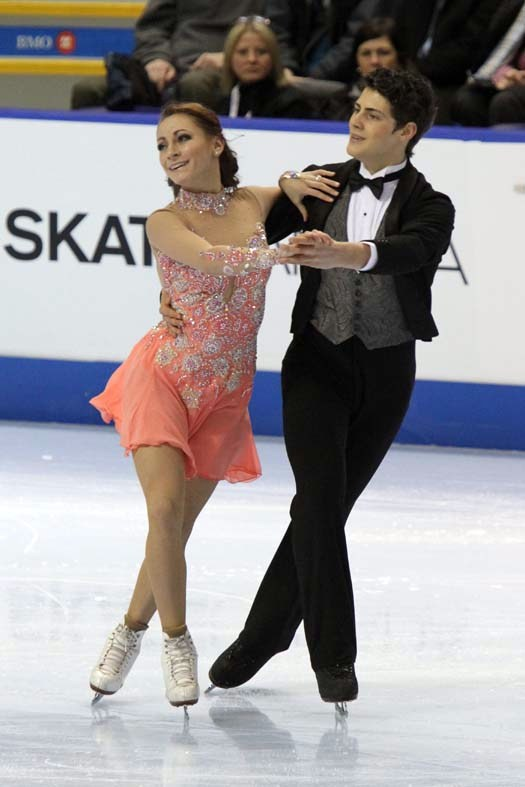
Crone/Poirier at the 2011 Canadian Championships

Crone/Poirier received the bronze medal at the 2009 NHK Trophy and placed fourth at their other Grand Prix event, the 2009 Rostelecom Cup.

At the 2010 Canadian Championships, they repeated as national silver medallists and were nominated to represent Canada at the 2010 Winter Olympics. They finished fourteenth at the Olympics and then seventh at the 2010 World Championships.

=== 2010–2011 season: Grand Prix and Four Continents bronze, national title ===
Crone/Poirier began their season by capturing gold at 2010 Skate Canada International, ahead of Sinead Kerr and John Kerr, who had a fall in the free dance. At the 2010 Skate America, Poirier fell in the free dance, but their score was enough for the silver behind Davis/White, both of whom fell, and ahead of Shibutani/Shibutani with no falls. Their results qualified them for the 2010–11 Grand Prix Final, where they won the bronze medal.

At the 2011 Canadian Championships, with Tessa Virtue and Scott Moir absent due to Virtue's injury, Crone/Poirier narrowly won the Canadian national title over Weaver/Poje. They won a bronze medal at the 2011 Four Continents Championships in Taipei, and finished tenth at the 2011 World Championships.

On June 2, 2011, Crone and Poirier announced the end of their ten-year partnership. He said that he would search for a new partner to continue his competitive career and did not exclude looking internationally.

=== 2011–2012 season: Debut of Gilles/Poirier ===
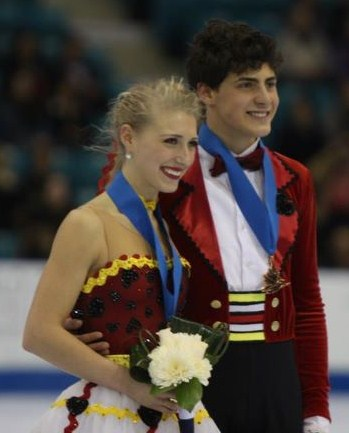
Gilles/Poirier at the 2012 Canadian Championships

Poirier contacted American ice dancer Piper Gilles to arrange a tryout. On July 27, 2011, the two confirmed they had teamed up to represent Canada. They were unable to compete internationally in their first season due to Gilles needing a release from U.S. Figure Skating. They decided to train under Carol Lane at the Scarboro Figure Skating Club at the Ice Galaxy in Scarborough, Ontario. Their free dance was choreographed by Christopher Dean in Colorado Springs, Colorado, in early June.

Gilles/Poirier won the bronze medal at the 2012 Canadian Championships. Due to their ineligibility for international competition that season, fourth-place finishers Ralph/Hill were named to Canada's delegation to the 2012 World Championships.

=== 2012–2013 season ===
In September 2012, Gilles and Poirier won gold at the U.S. Classic. They received two Grand Prix assignments, 2012 Skate Canada International and 2012 Trophée Éric Bompard. They finished fourth and sixth at the two events and then won the silver medal at the 2013 Canadian Championships. They were fifth at the 2013 Four Continents, winning a small bronze medal for the free dance, and eighteenth at their first World Championships, held in London, Ontario.

=== 2013–2014 season: Four Continents silver ===
In May 2013, Poirier sustained a serious ankle injury, delaying the duo's preparation for the upcoming season. Their assigned events for the 2013-14 Grand Prix season were the NHK Trophy, where they finished fifth, and the Rostelecom Cup, where they placed sixth. Gilles became a Canadian citizen in December 2013, making Gilles and Poirier eligible to participate in the Olympics.

Hampered by Poirier's injury, the duo finished fourth at the 2014 Canadian Championships and were not selected for the Canadian Olympic team. Years later, Gilles would admit that the result "was definitely disappointing, but it really made us who we are right now. We didn't want that big upset to change our goals in the future, and I think that made us stronger, more comfortable with each other because we really had to lean on each other. So I think it made all of us closer and better as athletes and more well-rounded."

Instead of the Olympics, they were sent to the 2014 Four Continents Championship, where they won the silver medal, placing behind Gilles' former partner Zachary Donohue and his new partner Madison Hubbell. Poirier opined that "we're going to take this competition with us because it taught us a lot about resilience and about being able to come back so quickly after nationals."

=== 2014–2015 season ===
Gilles/Poirier won silver at both of their Grand Prix events, the 2014 Skate Canada International and 2014 Trophée Éric Bompard. These results qualified them for the 2014–15 Grand Prix of Figure Skating Final, where they placed fifth. At the 2015 Canadian Championships, they won the silver medal behind Weaver/Poje. The two capped off their season with a sixth-place finish at the 2015 World Championships.

=== 2015–2016 season ===
Gilles/Poirier opened their season with a win at the 2015 Ondrej Nepela Trophy. They finished as second alternates for the Grand Prix Final after taking bronze at the 2015 Skate America and silver at the 2015 Trophée Éric Bompard. After repeating as national silver medallists at the 2016 Canadian Championships.

They finished fifth at the 2016 Four Continents Championships, a result they considered disappointing, and which prompted significant revisions to their short dance program, which had initially been developed as a mix of music by The Beatles and Wolfgang Amadeus Mozart. The revisions made the dance primarily set to Beatles music. At the 2016 World Championships in Boston, Gilles/Poirier debuted the new program iteration, finishing fifth in the short and making the final flight in the free dance for the first time in their partnership. Poirier called this "something new for us and something that we’ve wanted, and it’s one of the things we really hoped we’d be able to do this year." They finished eighth in the free dance, dropping to eighth overall.

The ISU subsequently adopted elements of the short dance choreography debuted in Boston as a new pattern dance called the March, credited to Poirier, Gilles, their coach Carol Lane, and choreographer Juris Razgulajevs.

=== 2016–2017 season ===
The 2016–17 season featured the return to competition of Tessa Virtue and Scott Moir, which affected the standings of the other Canadian ice dance teams. Gilles/Poirier took bronze at the 2016 Skate Canada International, the 2016 Trophée de France, and the 2017 Canadian Championships. The two struggled with mistakes in their disco-themed short dance for much of the season, with a stumble at the French event and Gilles falling at the 2017 Four Continents Championships. Gilles described the results as "physically hard and definitely tough mentally." They finished eighth at the 2017 World Championships in Helsinki.

=== 2017–2018 season: Pyeongchang Olympics ===
Gilles/Poirier placed fourth at both of their Grand Prix assignments, the 2017 Skate America and 2017 Rostelecom Cup. Following this, the two opted to change their free dance program mid-season, discarding an initial film noir-themed routine for a James Bond program. Poirier explained that they felt the need for "a more accessible vehicle going into the Olympics and one that (fans) can more readily identify with." Their scores dramatically improved with the new program, and they earned the silver medal at the 2018 Canadian championships on the way to qualifying for the 2018 Winter Olympics in Pyeongchang, South Korea. Gilles described this as "a breath of fresh air because we've worked our entire lives for that Olympic moment; qualifying for the games has always been my dream." The duo placed eighth at their first Olympics and ended the season with a sixth-place finish at the 2018 World Championships.

=== 2018–2019 season: Four Continents bronze ===
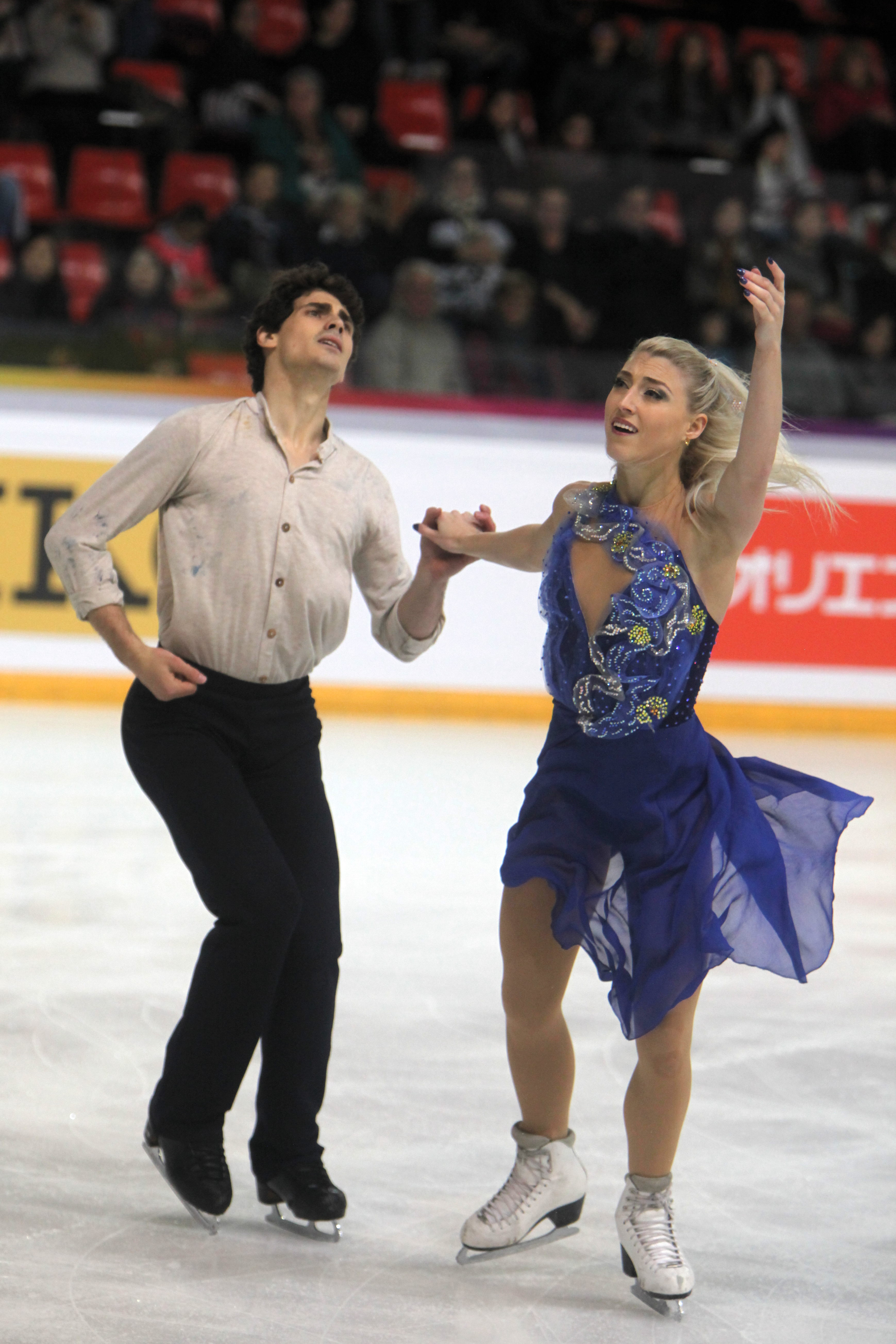
Gilles/Poirier perform their acclaimed "Vincent" program at the 2018 Internationaux de France

For their free dance, Gilles/Poirier envisioned a tribute to the artist Vincent van Gogh and arranged for the British busker act Govardo to create a cover version of the Don McLean song "Vincent" that had the tempo changes necessary for an ice dance program. "Vincent" would become the team's most acclaimed program to date. Gilles would later reflect on the season and say: "We find that this program brings a different energy every time we compete it. That’s why so many people can connect with it. It can touch people in so many different emotional ways. Every time we perform it, we’re drawing a new feeling from it."

Following Kaitlyn Weaver and Andrew Poje's decision not to skate the 2018–19 Grand Prix series, Gilles/Poirier became the top-ranked Canadian team competing there. They won their first outing of the season, the Nebelhorn Trophy, having placed first in both segments. The band Govardo attended the event, meeting them for the first time. At their first Grand Prix event, the 2018 Skate Canada International, Gilles fell during the rhythm dance, leaving them in sixth place. The two set a new personal best in the free dance, rebounding to capture the bronze medal. They won a second bronze medal at the 2018 Internationaux de France, ending as second alternates for the Grand Prix Final. Following this, it was announced that they had been added belatedly to the ice dance competition at the Golden Spin of Zagreb. They won the event, which they described as a means of regaining "positive energy" after missing the Grand Prix Final.

At the 2019 Canadian Championships, Gilles/Poirier placed second in the rhythm dance, behind Weaver/Poje, due to lower scores on the Tango Romantica pattern. They won the free dance but finished second overall by 1.47 points.

At the 2019 Four Continents Championships, Gilles/Poirier placed fourth in the rhythm dance, behind Hubbell/Donohue, Chock/Bates, and Weaver/Poje. They achieved their best results to date on the Tango Romantica pattern. In the free dance, they placed second, passing Weaver/Poje in the free for the second event in a row, while Hubbell/Donohue had a major stationary lift error that dropped them to fourth in the free dance and fourth overall. Gilles/Poirier won the bronze medal overall, their first Four Continents podium since 2014. They finished the season at the 2019 World Championships, where they placed seventh.

=== 2019–2020 season: National gold and Four Continents silver ===
In designing their rhythm dance for the Broadway musical theme, the team settled on Mack and Mabel, famously used decades earlier by Torvill and Dean, though they sought to avoid closely paralleling the music used in their version. For the free dance, they sought a Canadian artist, as the 2020 World Championships were scheduled to be held in Montreal. Ultimately, they settled on Joni Mitchell's "Both Sides Now", familiar to both of them for its use in the film Love Actually.

Gilles/Poirier began the season at the 2019 Autumn Classic, winning by over eighteen points over silver medallists Fear/Gibson. For their first Grand Prix assignment, they competed at the 2019 Skate Canada International in Kelowna. They placed second in the rhythm dance, 0.63 points behind defending champions Hubbell/Donohue. They won the free dance and took the gold medal overall by 2.70 points over Hubbell/Donohue, Gilles/Poirier's first Grand Prix gold medal, with Gilles saying they had "worked really hard for this moment." For their second event, the 2019 Rostelecom Cup, they placed second in the free dance behind reigning World silver medallists Sinitsina/Katsalapov. Second in the free dance as well, they won the silver medal and qualified to the Grand Prix Final for the first time in five years. Poirier remarked that they had "had a lot of ups and downs" in the years since and, at times, had doubted whether it would happen again.

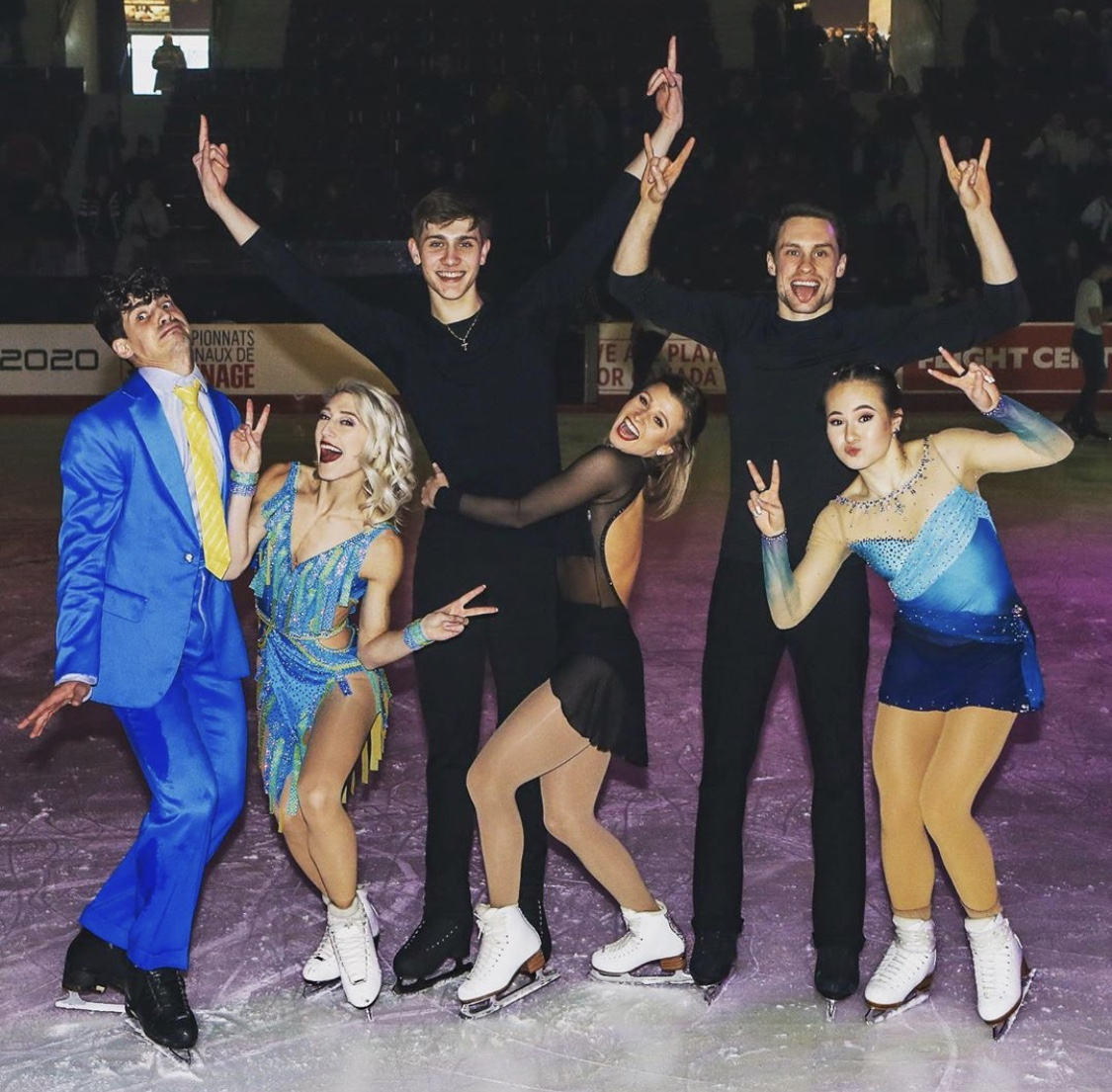
The 2020 Canadian national champions, left to right: Poirier, Gilles, Sadovsky, Moore-Towers, Marinaro, Bausback

At the Grand Prix Final in Turin, Gilles/Poirier placed sixth in the rhythm dance, which was called "a bit disappointing" in comparison to their earlier Grand Prix results. Fourth in the free dance, they rose to fifth overall, equalling their placement in 2014.

Gilles/Poirier were the heavy favourites going into the 2020 Canadian Championships. At the beginning of the rhythm dance, Gilles' hair became caught on Poirier's jacket, though his only affected their choreography rather than one of the technical elements. They nevertheless completed the program and led second-place finishers Lajoie/Lagha by 11.60 points going in the free dance. Winning the free dance as well by a wide margin, they claimed their first Canadian national title, which Gilles called "absolutely thrilling."

Competing at the 2020 Four Continents Championships in Seoul, Gilles/Poirier placed third in the rhythm dance, levels on the Finnstep pattern dance being the main difference between them and American rivals Chock/Bates and Hubbell/Donohue. Second in the free dance, they rose to the silver medal overall, with Gilles remarking "I think we are very happy with ourselves." They were assigned to compete at the World Championships, but these were cancelled as a result of the coronavirus pandemic.

=== 2020–2021 season: World bronze ===
Gilles/Poirier were assigned to the 2020 Skate Canada International, but the event was also cancelled due to the pandemic. With the pandemic continuing to make in-person competitions difficult, Gilles/Poirier competed at a virtually-held 2021 Skate Canada Challenge, winning the gold medal by a margin of 16.42 points over silver medallists Fournier Beaudry/Sørensen. The 2021 Canadian Championships were subsequently cancelled.

On February 25, Gilles and Poirier were announced as part of the Canadian team to the 2021 World Championships, to be held in Stockholm without an audience due to the pandemic. Four-time and defending World champions Papadakis/Cizeron had declined to attend the event due to the pandemic and their own past COVID illness, resulting in the podium being considered more open than in previous seasons, with Gilles/Poirier among the six teams viewed as contenders. They placed fourth in the rhythm dance, 1.78 points behind Chock/Bates in third. They came second in the free dance with a new personal test in both that segment and in total score, rising to third overall and finishing only 0.36 points behind the silver medals, Madison Hubbell and Gilles' former partner Zachary Donohue. Poirier remarked afterwards that it had "been a very long time for us; we were kind of stuck between sixth and eighth for a very long time, essentially since 2014, so I think just the pent-up frustration of so many years, being able to accomplish this just feels like such a nice relief." Their placement combined with Fournier Beaudry/Sørensen's eighth-place qualified three berths for Canadian dance teams at the 2022 Winter Olympics.

=== 2021–2022 season: Beijing Olympics ===
In the aftermath of their World medal win, Gilles and Poirier could not tour with ice shows due to ongoing pandemic restrictions and so focused on their preparations for the Olympic season. They selected an Elton John medley for the rhythm dance. For the free dance, they collaborated with the band Govardo for the second time, having them craft a new cover version of the Beatles' song "The Long and Winding Road", which they described as "really about the road that brought us to this Olympic moment and our story." Making their season's debut at the 2021 CS Autumn Classic International, they won the event for the second time in the first major skating competition held in Canada in a year and a half.

Gilles/Poirier started on the Grand Prix at the 2021 Skate Canada International, where they improved their personal best in the rhythm dance by over two points for an 85.65 score. Winning the free dance, they also claimed their second consecutive gold medal at the event. At their second event, the 2021 Internationaux de France, they placed second in both segments to take the silver medal, albeit with lower scores than at their preceding two events of the season. Assessing the results, Gilles said that she felt they had "made some improvements compared to Skate Canada, but our score is a bit lower, and we need to go back and evaluate that." Their results qualified them to the Grand Prix Final, but it was subsequently cancelled due to restrictions prompted by the Omicron variant.

At the 2022 Canadian Championships, held in Ottawa without an audience due to the pandemic, Gilles/Poirier easily won both segments of the competition to take their second national title. They described nervousness at debuting new choreographic changes since the Grand Prix. The following day, they were named to their second Canadian Olympic team.

Gilles/Poirier began the 2022 Winter Olympics as the Canadian entries in the rhythm dance segment of the Olympic team event. Both lost a level on their twizzles and, as a result, unexpectedly finished fourth behind Italians Guignard/Fabbri, taking seven points for the Canadian team. Theirs was the highest placement for Canada on the first day of competition, which was notably missing Canadian men's champion Keegan Messing due to COVID-19 rules. They also skated the free dance segment, finishing third, while Team Canada came fourth overall. Days later in the dance event, Gilles/Poirier placed sixth in the rhythm dance, with their 83.52 score below their season's best due to Gilles' twizzle bobble. In the free dance, Gilles was unable to get into proper position in the first part of their combination lift, resulting in them placing seventh in that segment and dropping to seventh overall. She said after that it "wasn’t the skate that we wanted. And you know, it's definitely hard."

Interviewed afterward by the University of Toronto's The Varsity, Poirier reflected on the Olympics, saying that he and Gilles were undecided about attempting to compete at the 2026 Winter Olympics. He ventured that he had come to terms with the possibility of never winning an Olympic medal, saying, "it's really nice to have medals, but they don't transform who you are as a person the way that living does. In the end, you have to make peace with what happens."

Gilles and Poirier concluded the season at the 2022 World Championships, held with Russian dance teams absent due to the International Skating Union banning all Russian athletes due to their country's invasion of Ukraine. Gilles/Poirier were fifth in both segments of the competition, finishing fifth overall. Poirier said that "I don't think the results in the second half of the season were exactly how we wanted them to be, but I think, especially after the free dance skate at the Olympics, we were so proud of our performance today, and we had a blast." They performed their trademark "Vincent" program in the exhibition gala, accompanied by a live performance by the band Govardo.

=== 2022–2023 season: Grand Prix Final champions and World bronze ===
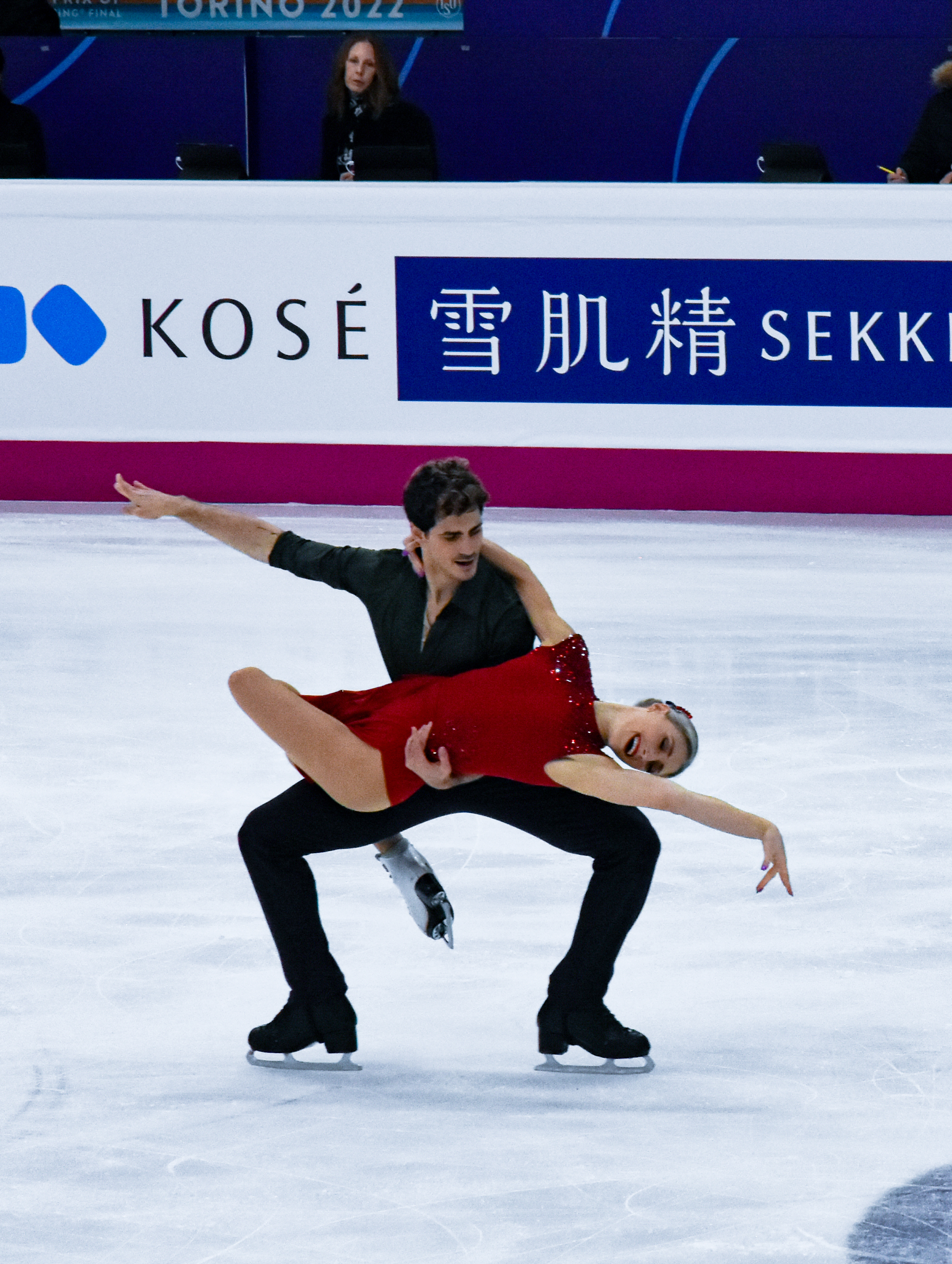
Gilles/Poirier at the 2022–23 Grand Prix Final

Gilles and Poirier took a lengthy break from training following the Olympic season and contemplated retirement. By mid-July, they had decided to continue, but as a result of the late start, they did not participate in the Challenger events before the start of the Grand Prix. For their free program, they opted to use Andrew Lloyd Webber's Evita, music that they had periodically discussed using at points over the preceding decade. Poirier said they related to the story of "Eva trying to find her way and figure out what she's going to do and who she's going to be and what she's going to stand for."

Seeking a third consecutive victory at Skate Canada International to open the season, Gilles/Poirier set a new personal best (87.23) in the rhythm dance and nearly equaling their best in the free dance. They won the gold medal by 6.52 points over Britons Fear/Gibson. At their second assignment, the 2022 Grand Prix of Espoo, they won the rhythm dance with another new personal best in that segment (87.80), almost seven points ahead of second-place Hawayek/Baker of the USA. They set a personal best in the free dance as well (131.69) and won their second Grand Prix gold medal with a 17.03-point margin over the silver medalists, and qualified to the Grand Prix Final in first position. In anticipation of the event, Poirier said, "the next two weeks will really be about managing our energy."

As the top seed, Gilles/Poirier entered the Final in Turin as the presumptive favourites, albeit not firmly so, against struggling American pre-season favourites Chock/Bates and Italian champions Guignard/Fabbri competing on home ice. They finished first in the rhythm dance, 0.44 points ahead of a resurgent Chock/Bates. They received lower levels on some elements than in previous events, which Poirier called "a fair assessment" that he attributed to hesitance in the face of strong competition. They won the free dance as well, taking the gold medal, the most significant victory of their careers thus far, and the first Grand Prix Final victory for any Canadian competitor since Virtue/Moir in 2016. Gilles assessed that they "felt great today, from start to finish." Their training mates, Nadiia Bashynska and Peter Beaumont, won gold in the Junior Grand Prix Final on the same day.

Gilles, who had begun to experience fatigue and left-side abdominal pain during the Grand Prix series, required surgery to remove what proved to be a cancerous left ovary, as well as her appendix. This surgery was initially reported to the public as an appendectomy, as a result of which the team withdrew from the 2023 Canadian Championships. They were provisionally assigned to the 2023 Four Continents Championships, but subsequently withdrew to focus on recovery. Poirier would later say "this is one of my best friends, someone I've known for a chunk of my life, and we were thinking about her mental well-being through this, too."

Able to return to competition for the 2023 World Championships in Saitama, Gilles/Poirier finished in third place in the rhythm dance, less than a point behind second-place Guignard/Fabbri but solidly behind segment leaders Chock/Bates. Gilles said that she was "so proud of what we accomplished today, with being a little bit nerve wracking not having two competitions under our belt, missing out on that." They were third in the free dance as well, winning their second World bronze medal. She called it "such a special year, so just finishing this season with a medal gives us confidence knowing that we did our job this season." With Chock/Bates and Guignard/Fabbri joining them on the podium, it was the first at the World Championships ice dance event where all medalists were aged 30 or older.

Following the World Championships, Gilles/Poirier toured Japan with Stars on Ice before joining Team Canada at the World Team Trophy for the first time. Gilles was named the team captain. They finished third in the rhythm dance after Gilles lost a twizzle level. They were third in the free dance as well. Team Canada finished in sixth place.

=== 2023–2024 season: World silver and Four Continents gold ===
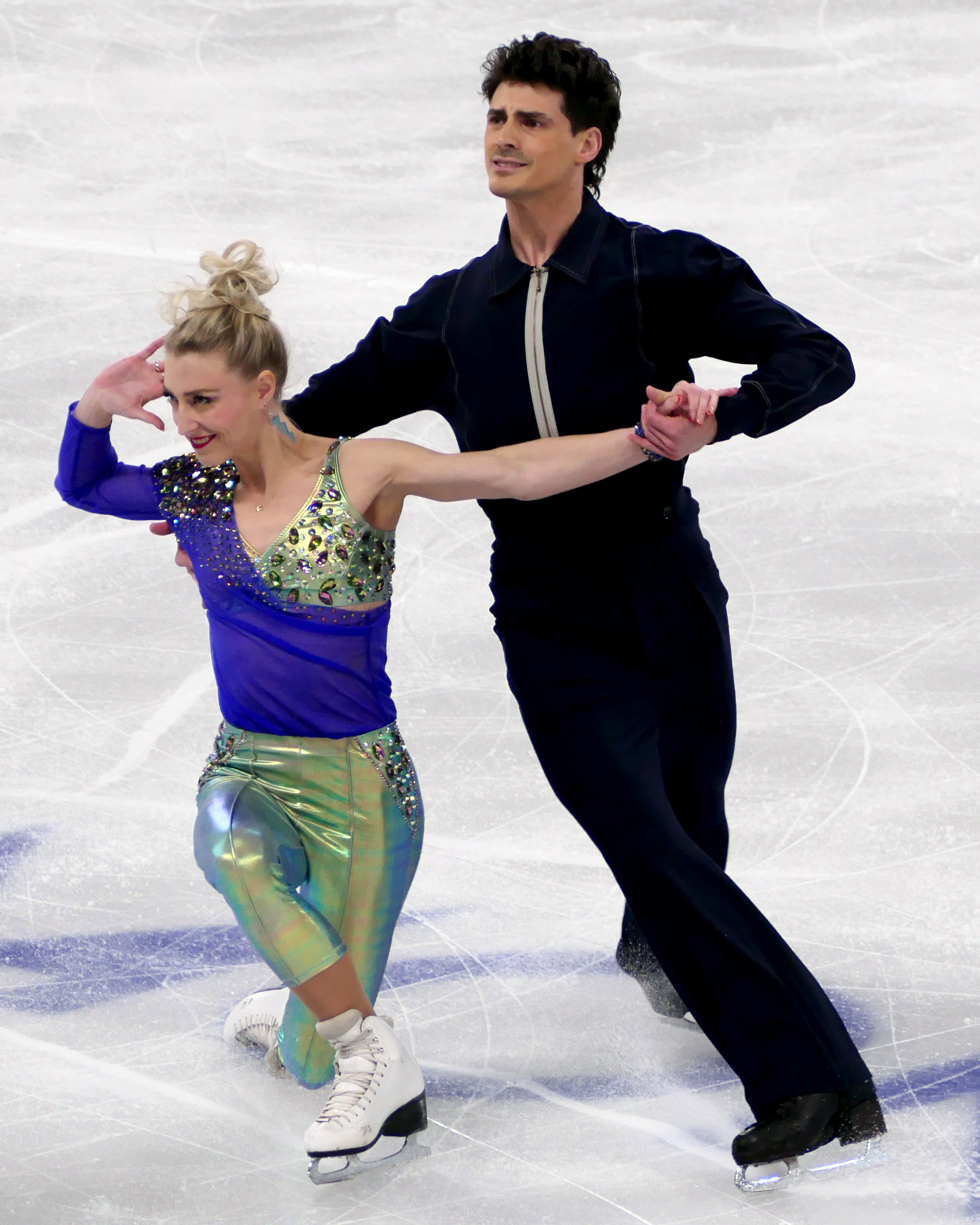
Gilles/Poirier during their rhythm dance at the 2024 World Championships

Gilles and Poirier spent much of the summer performing in ice shows, and did not compete on the Challenger series. For their free dance for the season they chose Ryuichi Sakamoto's score for the 1992 film adaptation of Emily Brontë's Wuthering Heights. Poirier said their interest was in "the theme of love and hatred and how it exists. And in some cases they can coexist. You can deeply love someone and deeply hate them at the same time. And the tension between those two emotions is really what we are trying to explore."

Beginning the Grand Prix at the 2023 Skate Canada International, they won the gold medal with a score only 0.48 higher than their personal best, nearly ten points clear of repeat silver medalists Fear/Gibson. They next appeared at the Cup of China for the first time in their careers, entering as the favourites, but encountered difficulties in the rhythm after Gilles had a twizzle error. They placed second in the segment, 0.98 points behind fellow Canadians Lajoie/Lagha. Gilles explained afterward that "our big focus of the program was to try to amplify the energy and performance," opining that "I felt I gave too much, and so I wasn't really grounded." She also had a twizzle error in the free dance, but they still placed first in that segment and rose to the gold medal position, finishing 1.81 points ahead of Lajoie/Lagha.

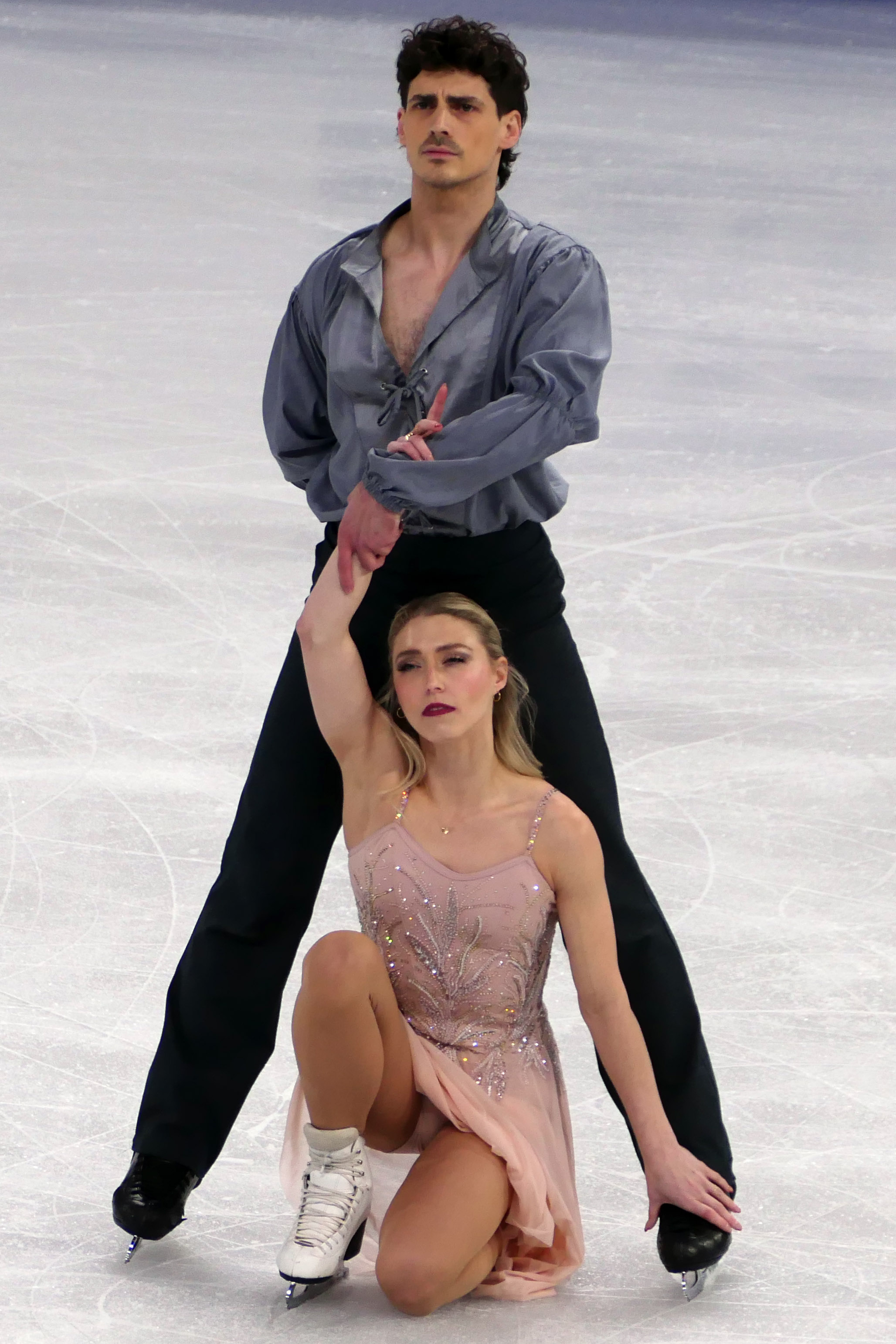
Gilles/Poirier during their free dance at the 2024 World Championships

Returning to China for the 2023–24 Grand Prix Final, this time in Beijing, Gilles/Poirier came third in the rhythm dance, narrowly behind Guignard/Fabbri in second place but nearly nine points clear of Fear/Gibson in fourth due to errors by the latter. Third in the free dance as well, they won the bronze medal.

Gilles/Poirier successfully recaptured the Canadian national title by a wide margin at the 2024 Canadian Championships in Calgary. Gilles felt they "really skated like champions today. We stepped out onto the ice and just remembered who we were and why we're here." They then journeyed again to China at month's end for the 2024 Four Continents Championships, held in Shanghai. With principal rivals Chock/Bates absent, Gilles/Poirier entered the event as heavy favourites for the gold medal. They won both segments of the competition to take their first Four Continents title, of which Poirier said they were "really proud." “I think we’re really pleased,” said Poirier. “It’s such a big milestone in our career, so I think we’re really proud of ourselves to be able to win a competition of this caliber at this point in our careers."

The 2024 World Championships were held in Montreal, the second home World Championships in Gilles/Poirier's career together, which they called "a full-circle moment." They came third in the rhythm dance, 1.01 points behind Guignard/Fabbri in second and 3.57 points behind segment leaders Chock/Bates. In the free dance, they scored a new personal best of 133.14, and won the segment, moving up to second place overall, 2.52 behind Chock/Bates. Gilles/Poirier received a gold small medal for the free dance, and the overall silver medal. Gilles opined that "winning the free I think shows that we're capable of being on top of the podium at the World Championships."

=== 2024–2025 season: Second World silver and Four Continents gold ===
With the rhythm dance theme for the season being "Social Dances and Styles of the 1950s, 1960s and 1970s," Gilles and Poirier decided to explore what he described as the "really idyllic American dream that doesn't really exist, but was just so prevalent in the media of that era, of that picture perfect California world." The program featured the music of the Beach Boys and The Surfaris. They planned a range of costumes for the course of the season modelled on Barbie and Ken, Gilles adding "what's more California than Barbie and Ken?" For the free dance, they chose to adapt one of their show programs from the summer's Stars on Ice tour, using Annie Lennox's cover of "A Whiter Shade of Pale".

Gilles/Poirier started the season by competing on the 2024–25 Grand Prix circuit, winning 2024 Skate Canada International for a fifth time. Poirier said that they aimed to avoid over-training in the manner they felt they had done at the start of the prior season. Going on to compete at the 2024 Finlandia Trophy, the team won the rhythm dance but only placed fourth in the free dance after their blades collided during their twizzles, causing Poirier to fall. They would win the silver medal overall, thus qualifying for the 2024–25 Grand Prix Final. Poirier made another significant error at the Final, falling in the pattern step element, as a result of which they placed a distant sixth among the six teams competing in the segment. They rebounded in the free dance, coming second in that segment, rising to fifth overall. They finished 0.57 points behind fellow Canadians Lajoie/Lagha in fourth.

Following the disappointment on the Grand Prix, Gilles/Poirier won their fourth national title at the 2025 Canadian Championships by a wide margin. Poirier said that their two solid programs on home ice were enough to give them "confidence in ourselves."

Gilles/Poirier entered the 2025 Four Continents Championships as the defending champions, but this time competing against reigning World champions Chock/Bates, who had missed the prior edition. In the rhythm dance, Gilles/Poirier won the segment with a 1.01-point lead over Chock/Bates in second. They received a gold small medal. They came narrowly second in the free dance, but remained first overall by 0.53 points, successfully retaining their Four Continents title. Of the competition with the Americans, Poirier observed "it's nice to have that motivation."

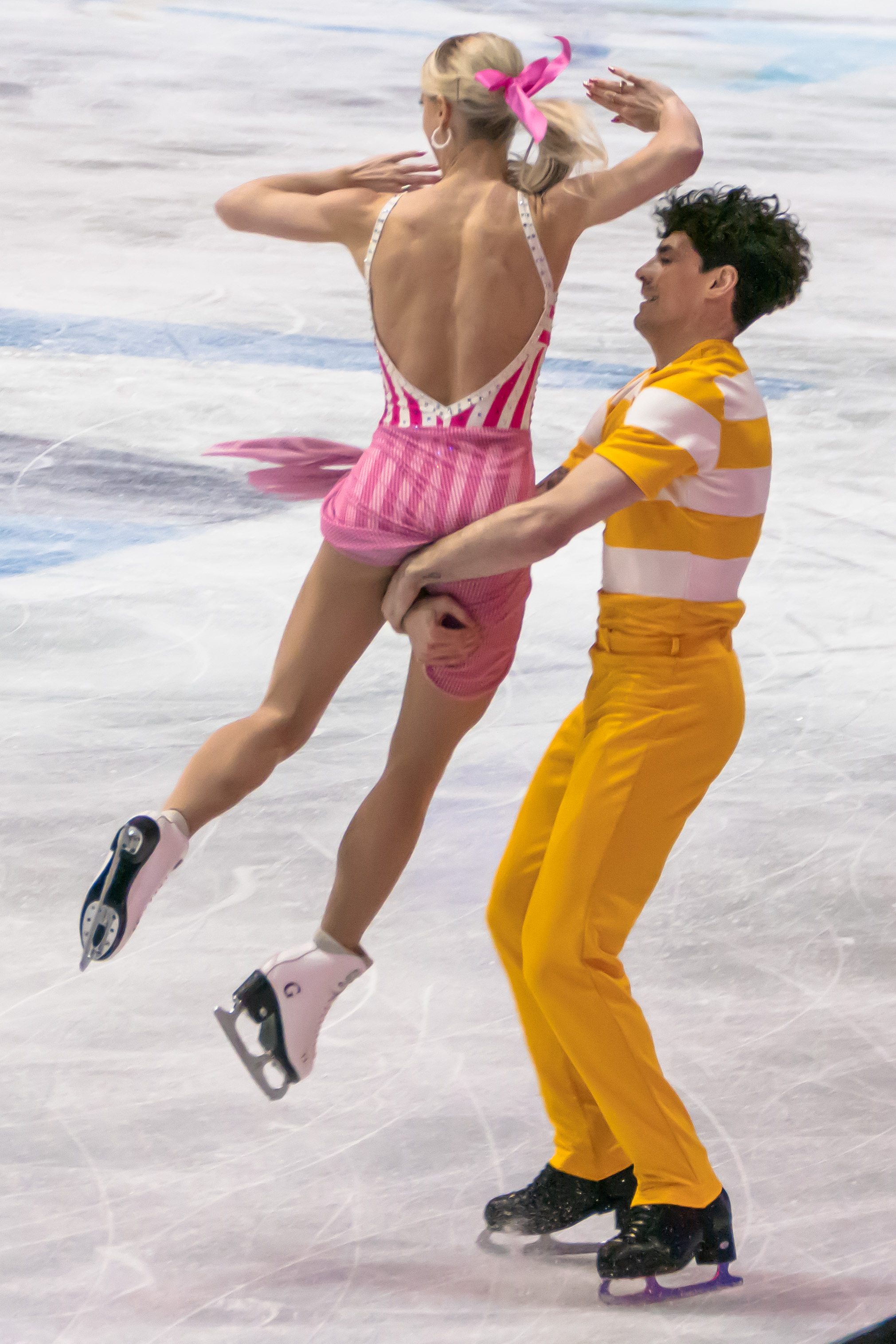
Gilles/Poirier performing a lift during their rhythm dance at the 2025 World Championships

The 2025 World Championships were held in Boston. Following their rhythm dance performance, where they placed second with a score of 86.44, Poirier recalled their performance at the 2016 World Championships in the same venue, saying that "had a really memorable performance in the short the last time. I think we felt that same energy today." The team finished 3.74 points behind Chock/Bates, a difficult margin to overcome, but also nearly three points clear of Fear/Gibson in third. Gilles/Poirier finished second in the free dance as well, albeit by a narrower margin behind the Americans, and took their second consecutive World silver medal, and fourth World medal overall. Gilles said they were "really proud of ourselves. We wanted to be on top of the podium here, so it is a little disappointing, but there's not much to be disappointed about because we had two wonderful skates." “We were so settled from the moment it started,” said Gilles of the free dance. “It was the calmest we’ve felt all year. We just wanted to enjoy this program one last time. To put it out on the ice when it really counts is so special.

They were selected to compete for Team Canada at the 2025 World Team Trophy. Gilles/Poirier placed second in all segments of the ice dance event and Team Canada finished in fifth place overall. Poirier stated after the free dance that the season had been highly fulfilling in many respects. He noted that the team felt strong and well-prepared throughout the latter half of the season, which provided valuable insight into both their capabilities and the type of preparation required to perform at their highest level. He added that they intend to carry those lessons into the Olympic season, which had already begun for them.

=== 2025–2026 season: Olympic bronze and World silver ===
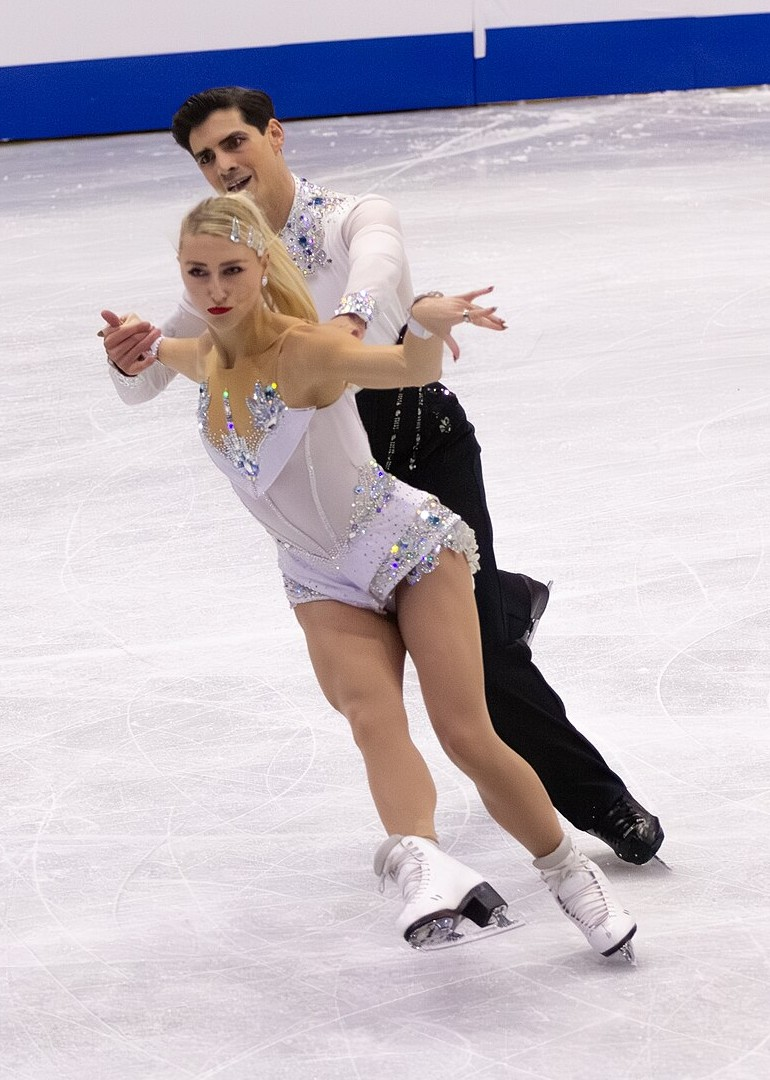
Gilles/Poirier during the rhythm dance at 2025 Skate Canada International

Gilles/Poirier opened their season at 2025 Skate Canada International, winning their sixth consecutive Skate Canada International title. They placed first in the Rhythm dance, earning the highest score thus far of the season. The team revived their popular "Vincent" Free Dance, but had a small slip on the curve lift, placing second in this segment. However, they still maintained first place overall for the gold. “It’s just one of those things, sometimes timing just isn’t right,” Gilles explained of the lift. “It just kind of slipped and it didn’t stay in the position. It was a huge mistake, but again, it’s something that we can learn from.”

Three weeks later, Gilles/Poirier competed at 2025 Finlandia Trophy. It was noted during the Rhythm Dance that nearly all the ice dance teams at this event received low scores on some elements, particularly the step sequences. Gilles relayed that there was room for growth for the technical panel: “We love this sport. I think where our system is right now is at a crossroad, and I think the viewership is also understanding that we’re kind of in that situation. Like, they don’t know what’s happening when they see an exclamation point. What the heck does that even mean, you know? So there’s just moments in our sport that we’ve lost that connection to who’s watching and also the connection between who’s controlling our fate. And I think that’s where this needs to change. The judges should judge what they see, the beauty and the artistry of this sport. So, I hope that there’s a way that we can move forward and open it up and truly be creative, because I think that’s what the fans are wanting. They’re wanting to come back and support this sport, but I think if our system is still this way, I don’t think we’re going to keep bringing in the people, because we’re discouraged and the audience is discouraged.”

Gilles and Poirier ultimately placed second overall at this event, qualifying for the 2025–26 Grand Prix Final. “The crowd has been so welcoming of us both," said Poirier after the Free Dance. "They really got behind our performance, so it’s been a real joy to be able to compete here this week. We’ve had low levels this week, so we’ll have some things we need to work on. We do have a little bit of time now before the Final to clean some things up before we go out there, but I think we’re really excited to qualify for the Final again and to take the next step closer to the Games.”

The following month, Gilles and Poirier competed at the 2025–26 Grand Prix Final, earning a news season's best in the Free Dance. They placed fourth overall. “I think we’re really happy with our performances this week,” said Poirier after the Free Dance. “We both feel the programs have grown a lot through the Grand Prix series. We feel stronger, we feel faster, we feel more commanding and we feel like we have a better understanding of the emotion of the programs."

In January, Gilles and Poirier competed at the 2026 Canadian Championships, winning their fifth national title. “We just lived every moment of that program,” said Gilles after the free dance. “It went by so fast, but I felt like every little fingertip, every little pointed toe felt like it was intentional." Following the event, they were named to the 2026 Winter Olympic team.

On 6 February, Gilles and Poirier competed their Rhythm Dance at the 2026 Winter Olympics Figure Skating Team Event where they finished fourth with a new season’s best score of 85.79. Poirier expressed great satisfaction with their return to Olympic competition, noting that the supportive atmosphere and strong energy from the crowd made the performance highly rewarding and memorable. Following the event, they were named to the 2026 Winter Olympic team.

Five days later, Gilles and Poirier took the bronze at the 2026 Winter Olympics after placing third in both the segments of the event. “This bronze medal means everything to us and our team, after 15 long years of journey,” said Gilles. “Paul and I have chosen time and time again to continue, to show people who we are on and off the ice. We feel these raw emotions that people can truly connect with, seeing a piece of themselves in action. It truly means everything.”

Days before the 2026 World Championships, it was announced that Gilles and Poirier had elected to return to the Wuthering Heights free dance that they previously used two seasons prior. They placed second in this event behind France's Laurence Fournier Beaudry and Guillaume Cizeron, earning their fifth world medal.

=== 2026–2027 season ===
During the off season, the pair announced that they would not compete on the 2026–27 Grand Prix circuit. Piper shared on her Instagram, "For us, this feels like the right moment to slow down, recharge, and take some time to reflect on everything this journey has given us."

== Programs ==
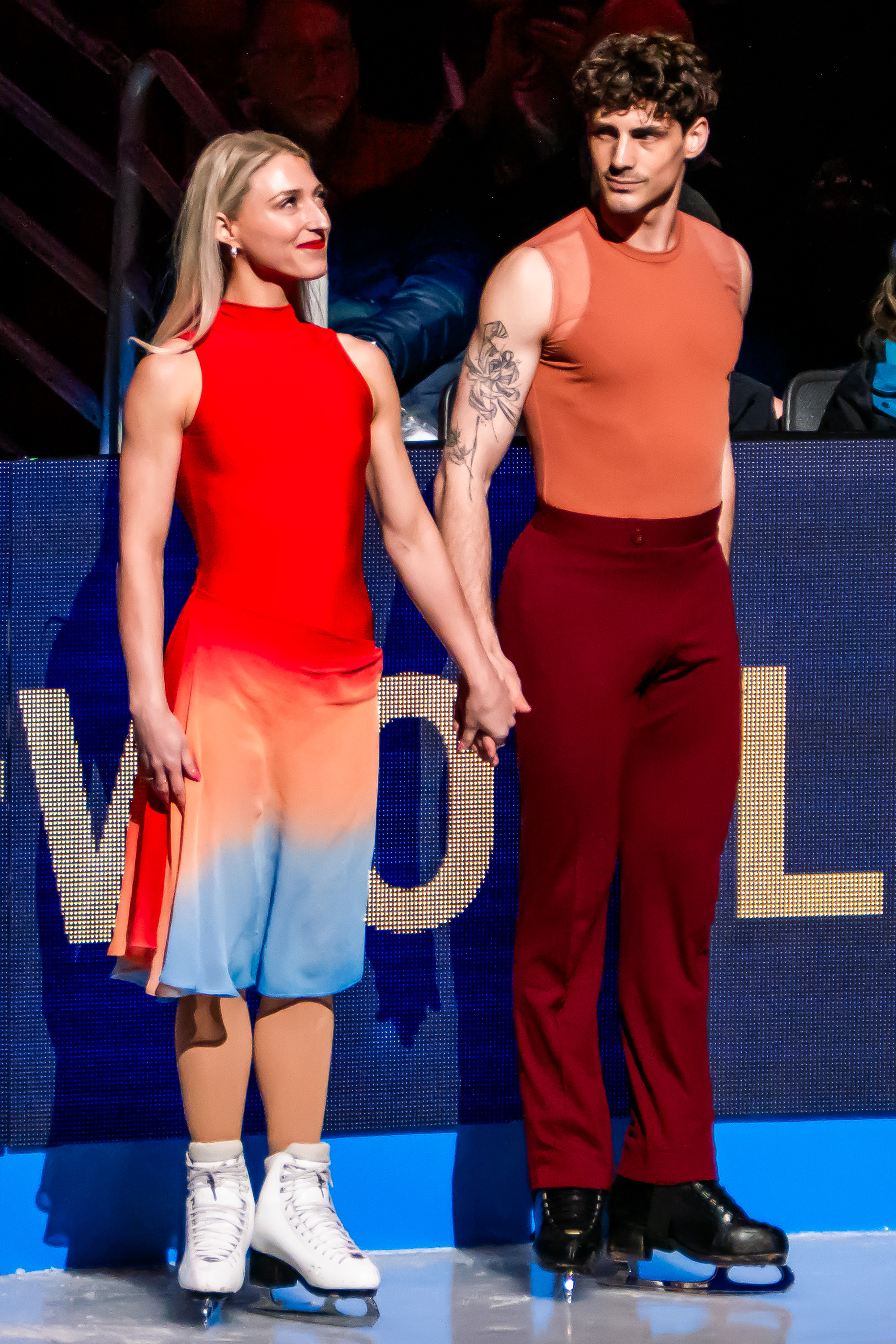
Gilles/Poirier during the exhibition program at the 2025 World Championships

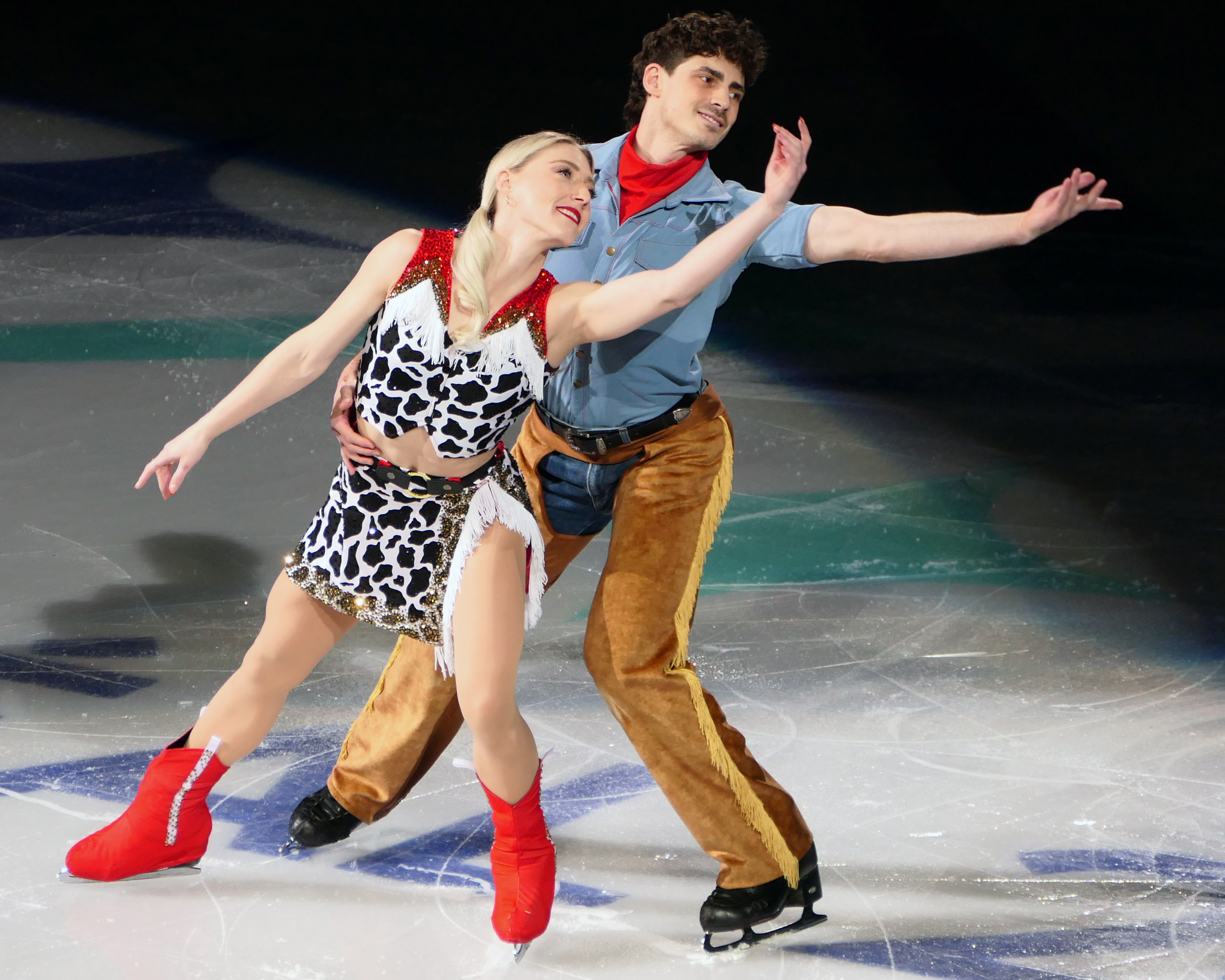
Gilles/Poirier during the exhibition program at the 2024 World Championships

=== Ice dance with Piper Gilles ===
Season	Rhythm dance	Free dance	Exhibition
2025–2026	Supermodel (You Better Work) by RuPaul; I'm Too Sexy by Right Said Fred; Supermodel (You Better Work) by RuPaul choreo. by Juris Razgulajevs, Carol Lane, Alexandra Crenian	Emily Brontë's Wuthering Heights; Main Theme / End Titles; Switching Sides by Ryuichi Sakamoto choreo. by Juris Razgulajevs, Carol Lane; Vincent by Don McLean performed by Govardo choreo. by Juris Razgulajevs, Carol Lane, Alexandra Crenian	Royals by Lorde; Autumn Leaves by Eva Cassidy
2024–2025	I Get Around; California Girls by The Beach Boys; Wipe Out by The Surfaris choreo. by Juris Razgulajevs, Carol Lane, Alexandra Crenian	Air on the G String by Johann Sebastian Bach performed by Robert Prizeman & Libera; A Whiter Shade of Pale by Procol Harum performed by Annie Lennox; Tango On the G String by Rob Colling; A Whiter Shade of Pale by Procol Harum performed by Annie Lennox choreo. by Juris Razgulajevs, Carol Lane	Autumn Leaves by Eva Cassidy
2023–2024	No More "I Love You's" by The Lover Speaks; Addicted to Love by Robert Palmer choreo. by Juris Razgulajevs, Carol Lane, Alexandra Crenian	Emily Brontë's Wuthering Heights; Main Theme / End Titles; Switching Sides by Ryuichi Sakamoto choreo. by Juris Razgulajevs, Carol Lane	Annie's Song; Thank God I'm a Country Boy by John Denver
2022–2023	Cha Cha: Do What I Do by Lady Bri; Rhumba: Rhythm Only (Rumba 25) by Dancelife Studio Orchestra; Cha Cha: Do What I Do by Lady Bri choreo. by Carol Lane, Juris Razgulajevs	Evita by Andrew Lloyd Webber & Tim Rice; You Must Love Me performed by Madonna; Waltz for Eva and Che performed by Party Time Karaoke; Waltz for Eva and Che performed by Madonna & Antonio Banderas; Don't Cry for Me Argentina performed by Madonna choreo. by Juris Razgulajevs, Carol Lane	Annie's Song; Thank God I'm a Country Boy by John Denver; Writing's on the Wall by Sam Smith
2021–2022	Blues: I Guess That's Why They Call It the Blues; Disco: I'm Still Standing by Elton John choreo. by Carol Lane, Juris Razgulajevs, Jeff Dimitrou	The Long and Winding Road by The Beatles performed by Govardo choreo. by Juris Razgulajevs, Carol Lane	Vincent by Don McLean performed by Govardo choreo. by Juris Razgulajevs, Carol Lane
2019–2021	March: Movies Were Movies performed by Robert Preston; Foxtrot: Look What Happened to Mabel performed by Bernadette Peters; Quickstep: Entr'acte; Quickstep: Tap Your Troubles Away performed by Lisa Kirk (from Mack and Mabel) by Jerry Herman choreo. by Carol Lane, Juris Razgulajevs, Jeff Dimitrou	Both Sides, Now by Joni Mitchell choreo. by Juris Razgulajevs, Carol Lane	The Man in the Wings by Alison Moyet; In the Mood by Wingy Manone, Andy Razaf, Joe Garland; Vincent by Don McLean performed by Govardo choreo. by Juris Razgulajevs, Carol Lane
2018–2019	Tango: Angelica's Tango by Piernicola Di Muro choreo. by Juris Razgulajevs, Carol Lane	Vincent by Don McLean performed by Govardo choreo. by Juris Razgulajevs, Carol Lane	The Man in the Wings by Alison Moyet
	Short dance		
2017–2018	Bossa Nova: Bossa Cubana by Los Zafiros; Mambo: Gopher Mambo by Yma Sumac	James Bond; Thunderball; Octopussy by John Barry choreo. by Juris Razgulajevs, Carol Lane; Stolen Hearts; Perry Mason Theme by Fred Steiner; Smokey Sax Perry by Hollywood Trailer Music Orchestra	A Fifth of Beethoven by Walter Murphy
2016–2017	Blues: Oh What A Night For Dancing by Barry White, Vance Wilson; Disco: Disco Inferno by Leroy Green, Ron Kersey	Con Buena Onda by Daniel Lomuto, Ernesto Baffa, Hector M. Acre	Let It Go by James Bay
2015–2016	Waltz: Lucy in the Sky with Diamonds; March: Norwegian Wood; Waltz: Ob-La-Di, Ob-La-Da by The Beatles; Waltz: Lucy in the Sky with Diamonds by The Beatles; March: Six German Dances, K. 571, No. 6 by Wolfgang Amadeus Mozart; Waltz: Air Pour Les Sauvages (from Les Indes galantes) by Jean-Philippe Rameau choreo. by Carol Lane	Saudade; She Said by Jorane; Neverland by Takenobu choreo. by Lane, Razgulajevs, Gilles, Poirier	Reaching for the Moon by Ella Fitzgerald
2014–2015	Paso doble: El Gato Montes; Spanish waltz: Capriccio Espagnol by Nikolai Rimsky-Korsakov	A Streetcar Named Desire; Gentlemen Prefer Blondes: Overture; Si tu vois ma mère; Dans les rues d'Antibes by Sidney Bechet	Would You by Burn the Floor Orchestra
2013–2014	Swing: Just One Dance; Quickstep: You Don't Leave Me by Caro Emerald	Hitchcock; End Credit; Explosion; The Premiere by Danny Elfman; Psycho; The Rainstorm by Bernard Herrmann	Sweet Dreams; Pure Imagination
2012–2013	Mary Poppins; Overture; Step in Time by Robert B. Sherman & Richard M. Sherman choreo. by Carol Lane, Juris Razgulajevs	The Gulag Orchestra by Beirut; I Don't Think About You Anymore But I Don't Think About You Any less by Hungry Ghosts; Nicoleta by Fanfare Ciocărlia choreo. by Lane, Razgulajevs, Christopher Dean	Sexy and I Know It by Glee; Sweet Dreams; Pure Imagination
2011–2012	Put It in a Love Song by Alicia Keys, Beyoncé; Magalenha by Sérgio Mendes choreo. by Carol Lane, Juris Razgulajevs	Pure Imagination performed by Maroon 5; Sweet Dreams by Eurythmics; Pure Imagination performed by Glee choreo. by Christopher Dean	Put It in a Love Song by Alicia Keys, Beyoncé; Magalenha by Sérgio Mendes choreo. by Carol Lane, Juris Razgulajevs

=== Ice dancing with Crone ===
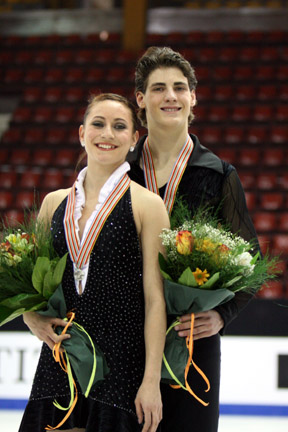
Crone and Poirier in 2008

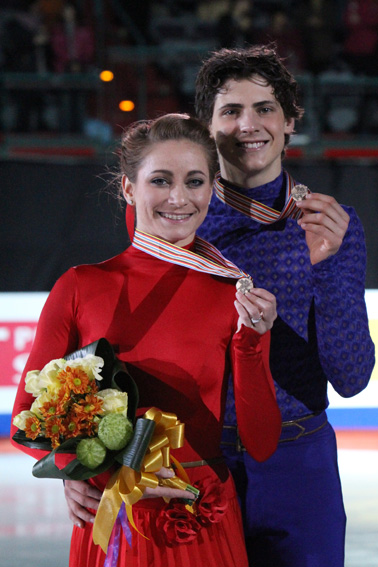
Crone and Poirier in 2011

Season	Short dance	Free dance	Exhibition
2010–2011	Fallin' by Alicia Keys	"Eleanor Rigby" by John Lennon, Paul McCartney performed by Joshua Bell choreo. by Christopher Dean	The Best Things Happen While You're Dancing by Danny Kaye
	Original dance		
2009–2010	En Malaga performed by Roger Scannura	Nocturne by Paul Swartz performed by Lucia Micarelli; Bohemian Rhapsody by Queen	
2008–2009	Slow Rag: Solace; Ragtime Two-step: The Entertainer by Scott Joplin	Doce de Coco by Jacob do Bandolim	
2007–2008	Blue Kerchief by Jerzy Petersburski; Gypsy by Boutouk	A Los Amigos by A. Pontier and F. Silva	Gravity by John Mayer
2006–2007	Tango	Capone by Ronan Hardiman	

=== Single skating ===
Season	Short program	Free skating
2008–2009	Come Together by John Lennon, Paul McCartney	Kvaska (soundtrack) by Daniel Landa

== Competitive highlights ==
=== Ice dance with Piper Gilles ===
- GP – Event of the ISU Grand Prix Series
- CS – Event of the ISU Challenger Series
- TBD – Assigned
- WD – Withdrew from competition
- C – Event was cancelled
- Medals at team events are awarded for the team result only. Individual placements at team events are listed in parentheses.

Competition placements at senior level
Season	2011–12	2012–13	2013–14	2014–15	2015–16	2016–17	2017–18	2018–19	2019–20	2020–21	2021–22	2022–23	2023–24	2024–25	2025–26
Winter Olympics							8th				7th				3rd
Winter Olympics (Team event)											4th				5th
World Championships		18th	8th	6th	8th	8th	6th	7th	C	3rd	5th	3rd	2nd	2nd	2nd
Four Continents Championships		5th	2nd	4th	5th	6th		3rd	2nd				1st	1st	
Grand Prix Final				5th					5th		C	1st	3rd	5th	4th
Canadian Championships	3rd	2nd	4th	2nd	2nd	3rd	2nd	2nd	1st	C	1st		1st	1st	1st
World Team Trophy												6th (3rd)		5th (2nd)	
GP Cup of China													1st		
GP Finland												1st		2nd	2nd
GP France		6th		2nd	2nd	3rd		3rd			2nd				
GP NHK Trophy			5th												
GP Rostelecom Cup			6th				4th		2nd						
GP Skate America					3rd		4th								
GP Skate Canada		4th		2nd		3rd		3rd	1st	C	1st	1st	1st	1st	1st
CS Autumn Classic				2nd			3rd		1st		1st				
CS Golden Spin of Zagreb								1st							
CS Nebelhorn Trophy						3rd		1st							
CS Ondrej Nepela Trophy					1st										
Skate Canada Challenge	1st					1st				1st					
U.S. Classic		1st													

=== Ice dance with Vanessa Crone ===
- GP – Event of the ISU Grand Prix Series
- JGP – Event of the ISU Junior Grand Prix Series

Competition placements at senior level
Season	2007–08	2008–09	2009–10	2010–11
Winter Olympics			14th	
World Championships		12th	7th	10th
Four Continents Championships		4th		3rd
Grand Prix Final			6th	3rd
Canadian Championships	4th	2nd	2nd	1st
GP NHK Trophy			3rd	
GP Rostelecom Cup			4th	
GP Skate America				2nd
GP Skate Canada		2nd		1st
GP Trophée Éric Bompard		4th		

Competition placements at junior level
Season	2005–06	2006–07	2007–08
World Junior Championships		9th	2nd
Junior Grand Prix Final			4th
Canadian Championships	6th	1st	
JGP Andorra	7th		
JGP Chinese Taipei		5th	
JGP Croatia			1st
JGP Norway		3rd	
JGP Romania			1st

=== Single skating ===
- JGP – Event of the ISU Junior Grand Prix Series
- J – Junior level, S – Senior level

Competition placements at junior & senior level
Season	2007–08	2008–09
JGP France		10th
Canadian Championships	2nd J	11th S

== Detailed results ==
ISU personal best scores in the +5/-5 GOE System
Segment	Type	Score	Event
Total	TSS	219.68	2024 World Championships
Rhythm dance	TSS	88.37	2023 World Team Trophy
Rhythm dance	TES	50.61	2022 Grand Prix of Espoo
Rhythm dance	PCS	37.91	2023 World Team Trophy
Free dance	TSS	133.17	2024 World Championships
Free dance	TES	75.25	2024 World Championships
Free dance	PCS	57.92	2024 World Championships

ISU personal bests in the +3/-3 GOE System (from 2010–11)
Segment	Type	Score	Event
Total	TSS	189.01	2017 World Team Trophy
Short dance	TSS	74.51	2018 World Championships
Short dance	TES	40.03	2018 World Championships
Short dance	PCS	35.25	2017 World Championships
Free dance	TSS	111.59	2018 World Championships
Free dance	TES	58.11	2018 World Championships
Free dance	PCS	54.30	2016 Skate Canada International

=== Ice dance with Piper Gilles ===
Senior level

- Small medals for the short program and free skating are only awarded at ISU Championships.
- Medals at team events are awarded for the team result only. The individual placements at team events are listed in parentheses.

Results in the 2011–12 season
Date	Event	SD		FD		Total	
Date	Event	P	Score	P	Score	P	Score
Nov 30 – Dec 4, 2011	2012 Skate Canada Challenge	1	58.79	1	94.66	1	153.45
Jan 16–22, 2012	(Canada) 2012 Canadian Championships	3	68.41	3	111.61	3	180.02

Results in the 2012–13 season
Date	Event	SD		FD		Total	
Date	Event	P	Score	P	Score	P	Score
Sep 13–16, 2012	(United States) 2012 U.S. International Classic	3	55.98	1	90.92	1	146.90
Oct 26–28, 2012	2012 Skate Canada International	5	58.79	4	94.66	4	153.45
Nov 15–18, 2012	(France) 2012 Trophée Éric Bompard	6	51.99	6	83.87	6	135.86
Jan 13–20, 2013	(Canada) 2013 Canadian Championships	2	67.95	2	102.86	2	170.81
Feb 6–11, 2013	(Japan) 2013 Four Continents Championships	5	60.20	3	97.63	5	157.83
Mar 11–17, 2013	(Canada) 2013 World Championships	15	58.61	18	81.41	18	140.02

Results in the 2013–14 season
Date	Event	SD		FD		Total	
Date	Event	P	Score	P	Score	P	Score
Nov 8–10, 2013	(Japan) 2013 NHK Trophy	5	55.20	5	88.87	5	144.07
Nov 22–24, 2013	(Russia) 2013 Rostelecom Cup	6	51.14	6	83.52	6	134.66
Jan 9–15, 2014	(Canada) 2014 Canadian Championships	4	65.11	4	99.41	4	164.52
Jan 20–26, 2014	(Taiwan) 2014 Four Continents Championships	1	62.38	2	91.33	2	153.71
Mar 24–30, 2014	(Japan) 2014 World Championships	10	59.42	7	94.44	8	153.86

Results in the 2014–15 season
Date	Event	SD		FD		Total	
Date	Event	P	Score	P	Score	P	Score
Oct 15–16, 2014	(Canada) 2014 CS Autumn Classic International	4	53.52	2	89.10	2	142.52
Oct 31 – Nov 2, 2014	2014 Skate Canada International	4	57.35	2	95.25	2	152.60
Nov 21–23, 2014	(France) 2014 Trophée Éric Bompard	2	61.90	2	95.68	2	157.58
Dec 11–14, 2014	(Spain) 2014–15 Grand Prix Final	4	62.49	5	95.67	5	158.16
Jan 19–25, 2015	(Canada) 2015 Canadian Championships	2	70.03	2	104.67	2	174.70
Feb 9–15, 2015	(South Korea) 2015 Four Continents Championships	4	63.45	4	98.80	4	162.25
Mar 23–29, 2015	(China) 2015 World Championships	7	65.90	6	99.32	6	165.22

Results in the 2015–16 season
Date	Event	SD		FD		Total	
Date	Event	P	Score	P	Score	P	Score
Oct 1–3, 2015	(Slovakia) 2015 CS Ondrej Nepela Trophy	3	62.56	1	96.58	1	159.14
Oct 23–25, 2015	(United States) 2015 Skate America	3	61.33	3	96.25	3	157.58
Nov 13–15, 2015	(France) 2015 Trophée Éric Bompard	2	63.94	–	–	2	63.94
Jan 18–24, 2016	(Canada) 2016 Canadian Championships	2	70.63	2	109.19	2	179.82
Feb 16–21, 2016	(Taiwan) 2016 Four Continents Championships	5	63.92	5	98.27	5	162.19
Mar 28 – Apr 3, 2016	(United States) 2016 World Championships	5	70.70	8	102.37	8	173.07

Note: The 2015 Trophée Éric Bompard was cancelled after the November 2015 Paris attacks. The short programs had been completed on November 13, but the free skates were to be held the next day. On November 23, the International Skating Union announced that the short program results would be considered as the final results for the competition.

Results in the 2016–17 season
Date	Event	SD		FD		Total	
Date	Event	P	Score	P	Score	P	Score
Sep 22–24, 2016	(Germany) 2016 CS Nebelhorn Trophy	3	70.32	3	106.52	3	176.84
Oct 28–30, 2016	2016 Skate Canada International	3	72.12	3	110.45	3	182.57
Nov 11–13, 2016	2016 Trophée de France	4	64.74	3	106.04	3	170.78
Nov 30 – Dec 4, 2016	2017 Skate Canada Challenge	1	80.04	1	116.24	1	196.28
Jan 16–22, 2017	(Canada) 2017 Canadian Championships	1	78.15	1	111.74	1	189.89
Feb 15–19, 2017	(South Korea) 2017 Four Continents Championships	7	61.21	5	108.93	6	170.14
Mar 29 – Apr 2, 2017	(Finland) 2017 World Championships	9	72.83	7	106.16	8	178.99

Results in the 2017–18 season
Date	Event	SD		FD		Total	
Date	Event	P	Score	P	Score	P	Score
Sep 20–23, 2017	(Canada) 2017 CS Autumn Classic International	3	68.80	3	103.46	3	172.26
Oct 27–29, 2017	(Russia) 2017 Rostelecom Cup	4	69.67	4	102.62	4	172.29
Nov 24–26, 2017	(United States) 2017 Skate America	5	64.07	4	102.47	4	166.54
Jan 8–14, 2018	(Canada) 2018 Canadian Championships	2	78.37	3	113.71	2	192.08
Feb 19–20, 2018	(South Korea) 2018 Winter Olympics	9	69.60	8	107.31	8	176.91
Mar 19–25, 2018	(Italy) 2018 World Championships	6	74.51	6	111.59	6	186.10

Results in the 2018–19 season
Date	Event	SD		FD		Total	
Date	Event	P	Score	P	Score	P	Score
Sep 26–29, 2018	(Germany) 2018 CS Nebelhorn Trophy	1	77.40	1	116.72	1	194.12
Oct 26–28, 2018	2018 Skate Canada International	6	66.95	3	120.02	3	186.97
Nov 23–25, 2018	2018 Internationaux de France	3	74.25	3	114.49	3	188.74
Dec 5–8, 2018	(Croatia) 2018 CS Golden Spin of Zagreb	1	79.80	1	121.47	1	201.27
Jan 13–20, 2019	(Canada) 2019 Canadian Championships	2	83.08	1	129.23	2	212.31
Feb 7–10, 2019	(United States) 2019 Four Continents Championships	4	78.05	2	124.40	3	202.45
Mar 18–24, 2019	(Japan) 2019 World Championships	8	80.44	7	120.48	7	200.92

Results in the 2019–20 season
Date	Event	RD		FD		Total	
Date	Event	P	Score	P	Score	P	Score
Sep 12–14, 2019	(Canada) 2019 CS Autumn Classic International	1	79.61	1	122.88	1	202.49
Oct 25–27, 2019	2019 Skate Canada International	2	82.58	1	126.43	1	209.01
Nov 15–17, 2019	(Russia) 2019 Rostelecom Cup	2	82.56	2	125.08	2	207.64
Dec 4–8, 2019	(Italy) 2019–20 Grand Prix Final	6	79.53	4	123.97	5	203.50
Jan 13–19, 2020	(Canada) 2020 Canadian Championships	1	88.86	1	136.76	1	225.62
Feb 4–9, 2020	(South Korea) 2020 Four Continents Championships	3	83.92	2	126.26	2	210.18

Results in the 2020–21 season
Date	Event	RD		FD		Total	
Date	Event	P	Score	P	Score	P	Score
Jan 8–17, 2021	2021 Skate Canada Challenge	1	87.96	1	135.37	1	223.33
Mar 22–28, 2021	(Sweden) 2021 World Championships	4	83.37	2	130.98	3	214.35

Results in the 2021–22 season
Date	Event	RD		FD		Total	
Date	Event	P	Score	P	Score	P	Score
Sep 16–18, 2021	(Canada) 2021 CS Autumn Classic International	1	83.35	1	125.62	1	208.97
Oct 29–31, 2021	2021 Skate Canada International	1	85.65	1	125.32	1	210.97
Nov 19–21, 2021	2021 Internationaux de France	2	81.35	2	121.81	2	203.16
Jan 6–12, 2022	(Canada) 2022 Canadian Championships	1	86.98	1	132.26	1	219.24
Feb 4–7, 2022	(China) 2022 Winter Olympics – Team event	4	82.72	3	124.39	4	–
Feb 12–14, 2022	(China) 2022 Winter Olympics	6	83.52	7	121.26	7	204.78
Mar 21–27, 2022	(France) 2022 World Championships	5	80.79	5	121.91	5	202.70

Results in the 2022–23 season
Date	Event	RD		FD		Total	
Date	Event	P	Score	P	Score	P	Score
Oct 28–30, 2022	2022 Skate Canada International	1	87.23	1	128.47	1	215.70
Nov 25–27, 2022	(Finland) 2022 Grand Prix of Espoo	1	87.80	1	131.69	1	219.49
Dec 8–11, 2022	(Italy) 2022–23 Grand Prix Final	1	85.93	1	129.71	1	215.64
Mar 22–26, 2023	(Japan) 2023 World Championships	3	87.34	3	130.54	3	217.88
Apr 13–16, 2023	(Japan) 2023 World Team Trophy	3	88.37	3	128.48	6 (3)	216.85

Results in the 2023–24 season
Date	Event	RD		FD		Total	
Date	Event	P	Score	P	Score	P	Score
Oct 27–29, 2023	2023 Skate Canada International	1	87.55	1	131.46	1	219.01
Nov 10–12, 2023	2023 Cup of China	2	81.04	1	126.79	1	207.83
Dec 7–10, 2023	(China) 2023–24 Grand Prix Final	3	85.17	3	128.41	3	213.58
Jan 8–14, 2024	(Canada) 2024 Canadian Championships	1	86.78	1	136.17	1	222.95
Jan 30 – Feb 4, 2024	(China) 2024 Four Continents Championships	1	85.49	1	128.87	1	214.36
Mar 18–24, 2024	(Canada) 2024 World Championships	3	86.51	1	133.14	2	219.68

Results in the 2024–25 season
Date	Event	RD		FD		Total	
Date	Event	P	Score	P	Score	P	Score
Oct 25–27, 2024	2024 Skate Canada International	1	86.44	1	128.40	1	214.84
Nov 15–17, 2024	(Finland) 2024 Finlandia Trophy	1	84.65	4	116.14	2	200.79
Dec 5–8, 2024	(France) 2024–25 Grand Prix Final	6	72.15	2	127.12	5	199.27
Jan 14-19, 2025	(Canada) 2025 Canadian Championships	1	91.84	1	137.71	1	229.55
Feb 19–23, 2025	(South Korea) 2025 Four Continents Championships	1	87.22	2	131.24	1	218.46
Mar 26–30, 2025	(United States) 2025 World Championships	2	86.44	2	130.10	2	216.54
Apr 17–20, 2025	(Japan) 2025 World Team Trophy	2	87.15	2	131.91	5 (2)	219.06

Results in the 2025–26 season
Date	Event	SP		FD		Total	
Date	Event	P	Score	P	Score	P	Score
Oct 31 – Nov 2, 2025	2025 Skate Canada International	1	85.38	2	117.51	1	202.89
Nov 21–22, 2025	(Finland) 2025 Finlandia Trophy	2	79.56	2	122.55	2	202.11
Dec 4–7, 2025	(Japan) 2025-26 Grand Prix Final	3	82.89	4	125.86	4	208.75
Jan 5–11, 2026	(Canada) 2026 Canadian Championships	1	93.11	1	137.94	1	231.05
Feb 6–8, 2026	(Italy) 2026 Winter Olympics – Team event	4	85.79	—N/a	—N/a	5	—N/a
Feb 6–19, 2026	(Italy) 2026 Winter Olympics	3	86.18	3	131.56	3	217.74
Mar 24–29, 2026	(Czech Republic) 2026 World Championships	2	86.45	3	125.07	2	211.52
