= The Power of Failing =

Studio album by Mineral
- Released: January 28, 1997
- Recorded: January – October 1996, Music Lane Recording Studios, Austin, Texas
- Genre: Emo; post-hardcore
- Length: 49:01
- Label: Crank!

Mineral chronology
The Power of Failing (1997)	EndSerenading (1998)

The Power of Failing is the debut studio album from the Austin, Texas-based emo band Mineral. Released on January 28, 1997, The Power of Failing was made available on both LP and CD format and has since been acclaimed as an essential album from the 90s emo movement.

== Reception ==
Professional ratings
Review scores
Source	Rating
AllMusic	4/5 stars
The Encyclopedia of Popular Music	4/5 stars
Kerrang!	2/5 stars
Pitchfork	8.5/10
Punknews	5/5 stars

The Power of Failing received extreme praise for its songwriting and honest lyrics. Writing for Allmusic, Blake Butler declared the record to be "a keystone album from one of the most well-known and revered emo rock bands of the '90s", stating that "although the structure is relatively simple most of the time, it is the essence of the music which overwhelms." Brandon Stosuy of Pitchfork said that "Part of what makes The Power of Failing a classic is that its raw feel and execution matches its emotions." Paul Travers of Kerrang! was less positive, criticizing the slowness of "Slower" and "Dolorosa" and comparing the band's "alterna-noise rock" sound unfavourably with Idlewild.

=== Legacy ===
The Power of Failing has been recognized as one of the landmark albums of 1990s emo. It has appeared on various best-of emo album lists by NME, Rolling Stone Similarly, "Gloria" appeared on a best-of emo songs list by Vulture. In 2024, Ryan De Freitas of Kerrang! said the album is "an absolutely essential listen." In a retrospective thinkpiece entitled "Mineral's 'The Power of Failing' Dragged Alternative Rock in a More Emotionally Vulnerable Direction", Eddie Cepeda of Noisey stated that "bands like Death Cab for Cutie and Pinback have Mineral to thank for much of their sound."

== Track listing ==
1. "Five, Eight and Ten" – 5:26
2. "Gloria" – 3:42
3. "Slower" – 5:47
4. "Dolorosa" – 5:10
5. "80-37" – 4:33
6. "If I Could" – 5:59
7. "July" – 4:24
8. "Silver" – 6:56
9. "Take the Picture Now" – 3:16
10. "Parking Lot" – 3:52
- "80-37" and "Take the Picture Now" did not appear on the original LP version.

== Personnel ==
Mineral

- Chris Simpson – guitar, vocals
- Jeremy Gomez – bass guitar
- Gabriel Wiley – drums
- Scott McCarver – guitar

Additional personnel

- Andre Zweers – engineering assistant
- Paul Drake – photography
- Judy Kirschner – engineering assistant
- Kevin Reeves – mastering
