= Hungry Ghosts =

Hungry ghosts are a concept in Buddhism and in Chinese traditional religion.

Hungry Ghost(s) or hungry ghost(s)may also refer to:

== Books ==
- Hungry Ghosts (novel), a 2023 novel by Kevin Jared Hosein
- Hungry Ghosts: Mao's Secret Famine, by Jasper Becker

== Film, television and radio ==
- The Hungry Ghosts, a 2009 American film by Michael Imperioli
- Hungry Ghosts (TV series), a 2020 Australian television series
- The Hungry Ghosts, part 2 of the 1998 and 2000 radio drama Midnight at the Casa Luna

== Music ==
- Hungry Ghosts (band), a Hong Kong rock band formed in 2007

=== Albums ===
- Hungry Ghost (album), 2013 album by Violent Soho
- Hungry Ghosts (album), 2014 album by OK Go
- Hungry Ghosts, 2005 album by Doug Cox

=== Songs ===
- "Hungry Ghost", by Blank Banshee on the album MEGA
- "Hungry Ghost", by Brad Mehldau
- "Hungry Ghost", by Hurray For The Riff Raff
- "Hungry Ghost", by Scars on Broadway, released as a B-side on the single "They Say"
- "Hungry Ghost", by STRFKR
- "Hungry Ghosts", by DJ Logic
- "Hungry Ghosts!", by Mudboy

== Other uses ==
- Preta, a type of supernatural being described in Hinduism, Buddhism, Taoism, and Chinese and Vietnamese folk religion, also known as hungry ghost

== See also ==
- Ghost Festival, also known as Hungry Ghost Festival, a festival held in some East Asian countries
- Yujia Yankou, a Chinese Buddhist ritual that originated as a rite to feed hungry ghosts but eventually expanded in significance as a ritual to facilitate the nourishment and ultimate liberation of all sentient beings in saṃsāra
- In the Realm of Hungry Ghosts: Close Encounters with Addiction, a book by Gabor Maté
- A Month of Hungry Ghosts, a 2008 Singaporean film
- Scroll of Hungry Ghosts, a Japanese National Treasure painting
- Segaki, a ritual of Japanese Buddhism sometimes translated as "feeding the hungry ghosts"
