= Air Castles =

British indie pop band

- Origin: London, England
- Genres: Indie pop
- Years active: 2008–2012
- Label: Winter Hymns Records
- Members: Max Mansson; Luke South; Jonathan Rogers

Air Castles was a British indie pop band, based in London, England, formed in 2008.

== History ==
Air Castles started as the solo project of then 19-year-old Swedish-born singer-songwriter, Max Mansson. Produced by Magnus Lindberg of Cult Of Luna, the debut EP, Night and Day, was released later that year on Mansson's own label Winter Hymns Records. The Guardian described the release as "spirited, piano driven melancholia...well worth hearing". The music magazine, Rock Sound, labelled the debut effort "fantastic", and referred to it as "sublime crystalline indie ... that will appeal to fans of Jeniferever, Sigur Rós, Death Cab For Cutie and Band of Horses alike". Their track, "Broken Watches", was used in the DVS Skate & Create 2009 skateboard video, attracting a following on YouTube.

Encouraged by the positive response to the EP, Mansson started writing new songs for an album, while establishing a live set-up together with Luke South and Jonathan Rogers, both of whom now form the band together with Mansson.

Air Castles have performed alongside Other Lives (band), Shout Out Louds, Peter Bjorn and John, Shearwater, The Pipettes, and toured Europe in 2011 with the Swedish indie pop band, Last Days of April. Air Castles performed at Glastonbury Festival in 2011, as one of the bands invited to play the BBC Introducing stage.

Their debut album, Lights, was recorded in 2010, and all instruments and vocals featured were performed by Mansson, apart from drums and percussion which were by Magnus Lindberg. The album was produced by Mansson and Lindberg, at Tonteknik Recording in Umeå, Sweden.

'Gold' is the first single to be taken from the album, and was released on 12 September 2011 on Winter Hymns Records.

Air Castles is on the roster of international artist booking agency Pitch & Smith, and Mansson signed a publishing contract in 2011 with Mars Music AB.

== Discography ==
- Night and Day EP (Winter Hymns Records, 2008)
- Lights (Winter Hymns Records, 2012)
