= Last Days of April =

Indie pop band

- Origin: Stockholm, Sweden
- Genres: Post-hardcore (early); Indie pop Alternative rock
- Years active: 1996–present
- Labels: Bad Taste Records, Straight Up Records, Deep Elm Records, Crank! Records
- Members: Karl Larsson; Lars Taberman; Andreas Fornell; Daniel Svenfors
- Past members: Oskar Ekman
- Website: www.ldoa.com

Last Days of April is an indie pop band from Stockholm, Sweden.

== History ==
Last Days of April formed in 1996. The band found some underground success with their first demo release. A full-length was issued in 1997, then an EP on Bad Taste Records in 1998. Their sophomore effort, Rainmaker, was released in both Europe (on Bad Taste) and Japan (on Straight Up Records), and the group toured with The Promise Ring and The Bufferins in Europe. Their third full-length was produced by Pelle Gunnerfeldt and saw a release on Deep Elm Records in America, while their fourth was issued in the United States by Crank! Records.

Since 2000, Karl Larsson has been the band's principal songwriter. Following the release of Gooey in 2010, Last Days of April toured Europe alongside the London-based indie pop band Air Castles the following year.

== Members ==
- Karl Larsson - vocals, guitar
- Lars Taberman - guitar
- Andreas Fornell - drums
- Daniel Svenfors - bass

== Former Members ==
- Oskar Ekman - bass

== Discography ==
- Henrik (1997) [EP]
- Last Days of April (Trust No One Records, 1997)
- The Wedding (1998) [EP]
- Rainmaker (Bad Taste/Straight Up, 1998)
- split with Bufferins (1998)
- Angel Youth (Bad Taste/Deep Elm, 2000)
- Ascend to the Stars (Bad Taste/Crank!, 2002)
- If You Lose It (Bad Taste, 2003)
- Might As Well Live (Bad Taste, 2007)
- Gooey (Bad Taste, 2010)
- 79 (Bad Taste, 2012)
- Sea Of Clouds (Tapete, 2015)
- Even the Good Days Are Bad (Tapete, 2021)
