= Vitreous Humor (band) =

1990–1996 American emo band

- Origin: Topeka, Kansas
- Genres: Emo, indie rock, post-hardcore, alternative rock
- Years active: 1990–96
- Label: Crank! Records
- Spinoffs: The Regrets
- Past members: Danny Pound (Lead Vocals, Guitar); Brad Allen (Bass, Guitar); Brooks Rice (Bass); Dan Benson (Drums); Chris Wall (Bass, 1989)
- Website: Label website

Vitreous Humor was an American alternative rock band formed in Topeka, Kansas, in the late 1980s by Danny Pound, Brad Allen, and Dan Benson. Described by AllMusic as "not easily categorized", the band was often referred to as "emo".

== History ==
Originally a quartet, the band had a revolving door of bassists until in 1993, Allen opted to play the bass. The group stayed as a trio for a year until the band took in Brooks Rice as their bassist, allowing Allen to return to his role of guitarist. Their sound was an angular, noisy take on indie rock, often juxtaposing clean, jangly chords and minimal guitar lines with dissonant, distorted power chords, much in the vein of Sonic Youth.

The band's first release was a self-titled 7-inch record, with three songs. Consequently, this was Crank! Records' first release as well. They also released a split 7-inch, sharing their song "Why Are You So Mean To Me?" (which was covered by the band Nada Surf) with fellow Crank! band Boys Life and their song "Temporary".

Their closest thing to a full-length release while they were still together is a self-titled EP, recorded with producer Bob Weston and released in 1995. The strength of this EP granted the band a lot of publicity, and tours with Archers of Loaf, Urge Overkill and Everclear, while the band was hounded with contracts from Elektra Records and Maverick Records. During this period the band recorded several tracks with Dave Trumfio in Chicago and released a 2 song 45 EP on Mute Records, which barely saw the light of day. The song "My Midget" from this session eventually made it to the band's final album, "Posthumous".

Eventually, the stress of touring got to the band, culminating in lead singer Danny Pound puncturing his left lung twice. The band broke up shortly afterward in 1996.

The members of Vitreous Humor would reunite not long after the original band broke up (minus Brooks Rice) and formed The Regrets, who took the band's previous focus on clean-but-angular guitars and pushed it, as they could no longer be as noisy as they were when Brooks Rice was in the band. Eventually the band reunited again as Vitreous Humor with Rice back in the fold; the band released one more album in 1998- the odds-and-sods "Posthumous".

Danny Pound continues to make music as a solo artist as The Danny Pound Band. Dan Benson from Vitreous Humor/The Regrets played drums for the band, but left and was replaced by Ken Pingleton.

== Discography ==
=== Splits and EPs ===
- Vitreous Humor (EP, 1994, Crank! Records)
- Boys Life/Vitreous Humor (split 7-inch with Boys Life, 1994, Crank! Records)
- Vitreous Humor (EP, 1995, Crank! Records)

=== Albums ===
- Posthumous (1998, Crank! Records)
- Posthumous - Reissued with Bonus Tracks (2021, Ernest Jenning Record Co)
