= Jupither =

Swedish power pop band

- Origin: Skellefteå, Sweden
- Genres: Power pop
- Years active: 1997–?
- Past members: Henrik Andersson; Christopher Falkman; Tomas Hornqvist; Mohamed Khan; Funky Dan Larsson; Olov Nilzen; Nico Nuzzaci; Fred Really; Stefan Westerberg

Jupither was a power pop band from Skellefteå, Sweden.

The band was formed in 1997 as Fresh Fish by Dan Larsson (vocals, bass)—later known as Funky Dan—and Mohammed Khan (drums, keyboards). The band soon recruited guitarists Olov Nilzen and Christopher Falkman. Their debut EP, It's Planetary, came out in 1998 on Swedish label Speech. It was also released in the United States by Crank! Records. The band has released three albums, a number of singles, and toured extensively. They have also appeared on a number of compilation albums.

2000's Strikes Back received a positive review in Östersunds-Posten, scored 3 out of 5 in Länstidningen Östersund and Expressen, and scored 2 in TT's syndicated review.
