= Mineral (band) =

American emo band

- Origin: Austin, Texas, U.S.
- Genres: Emo; post-hardcore; indie rock
- Years active: 1994–1998; 2014–2025
- Labels: Caulfield; Crank!; Interscope
- Spinoffs: The Gloria Record; Imbroco; Kissing Chaos; Pop Unknown; Pretty the Quick Black Eyes; Zookeeper; Mountaintime
- Members: Chris Simpson; Scott McCarver; Jeremy Gomez; Gabriel Wiley
- Website: http://www.officialmineral.com/

Mineral was an American emo band founded in Houston, Texas, that was primarily active in the mid-late 1990s. Despite being initially active for less than five years and releasing only two albums, Mineral is considered among the seminal bands in the emo genre. Their first album, The Power of Failing, has received critical acclaim as a "classic" in the genre.

== History ==
Within a few years of forming, Mineral were touring with emo bands including the Promise Ring and Jimmy Eat World, both early collaborators, despite themselves having no ties to the hardcore punk scene. In 1994, the band played a show in Houston with Christie Front Drive, and the Denver band went on to release Mineral's first 7-inch EP, Gloria. Mineral went on their first ever tour with Christie Front Drive, those shows being Mineral's introduction to the DIY music scene, of which they had been unaware.

Mineral was soon contacted by Jeff Matlow of Crank! a record company, who had been given their EP by a friend of the band. Mineral signed a three album deal with Crank!, and released their debut full length The Power of Failing in 1997. While recording the band's second album, EndSerenading, the band members signed individual deals with major label Interscope Records. The band was aware of then-current debates in the indie scene about selling out, and so asked to release EndSerenading on Crank!, meaning their deal with Interscope would only go into effect with their third album.

However, Mineral would break up soon after. The break up resulted from frontman Chris Simpson and bassist Jeremy Gomez wanting to move on, with Simpson in particular wanting to make music that did not fit Mineral's style, while guitarist Scott McCarver and drummer Gabe Wiley wanted to keep the band going. Mineral played their final show in 1997, and their final album, EndSerenading, was released the following year on Crank!. The band saw only modest success during their original run. Members of the band worked on other musical projects after disbanding, including The Gloria Record, Imbroco, Pop Unknown, Zookeeper, and Mountaintime.

After a more than 15-year hiatus, Mineral announced a reunion tour on April 24, 2014. Simpson identified the resurgent popularity of the band's music among Millennials, around the time of the emo revival, as a major reason for its reunion. The band released remastered versions of its two albums around the same time, with these versions receiving a "classic" review from Pitchfork, with particular praise for The Power of Failing. For the reissue, the band changed the font on the cover of its first album, which had originally been Comic Sans, something Simpson identified as a regret. In 2014, Simpson admitted to feeling "unsure" about the quality of both of the band's releases during and following the group's heyday, but said he has come to appreciate them later. He has said that he chose not to return to the group before 2014 because he viewed it as a "step back" at that time.

In 2019, the band celebrated its 25th anniversary with two new songs titled "Aurora" and "Your Body Is The World", a retrospective book, and by announcing a world tour, which was ultimately cut short by the COVID-19 pandemic. On September 25, 2021, the band performed at Furnace Fest 2021 in Birmingham, Alabama. The group disbanded for the second time in 2025, with their final show being the Best Friends Forever festival in Las Vegas.

In 2026, Numero Group repressed both of Mineral's full length albums on vinyl, in a box set entitled "Might As Well Be Here". The box set also included a new compilation, "...And What Remains", containing songs from previous compilations and 7-inches, and a booklet detailing the band's experience in their original run from 1994 to 1998, written by Nina Corcoran.

== Musical style and legacy ==
Mineral have mainly been described as being an emo band but incorporate elements of indie rock, post-rock, and alternative rock. Though its origins are in the Southern United States rather than the Midwestern United States, Mineral has been identified with the Midwest emo movement, and has been said to take significant influence from another non-Midwestern band commonly associated with Midwest emo, Sunny Day Real Estate. However, Mineral have rejected the term emo, finding it to be "limiting" and "belittling." Chris Simpson has stated that,

Maybe that's just artistic sensitivity -- any label would feel limiting, other than rock. I remember DJ Shadow, who I'm a big fan of, doing an in-store in Austin and a Q&A afterwards. Someone asked him, "what would you call your music?" and he's like, "I always answer this the same way -- I would call it hip-hop. I know it's not traditional MC-ing, but it's the same way Eric Clapton will probably always call the music he plays blues -- because that's the music he first took in, was passionate about and got him started. For me that was hip-hop." For us, that was just rock. And maybe at some point, certainly punk rock and independent music came into that. We grew up listening to rock bands, and to me, any label more specific than that feels too limiting.

In a Reddit AMA, Chris Simpson and Jeremy Gomez cited Catherine Wheel, Sugar, Swervedriver, Buffalo Tom, Dinosaur Jr., Superchunk, and Rocket from the Crypt as the band's main influences. Simpson's idiosyncratic singing style was particularly influenced by the Innocence Mission's Karen Peris.

During Mineral's initial run, Simpson's grappling with his Christian beliefs was a key theme of the band's music, though he no longer considers himself a Christian. Critics have also identified family and romantic relationships and anxiety as common themes in the band's music.

The band has earned consistent critical acclaim. Ron DePasquale of AllMusic said "[Mineral's] shaping of the indie rock landscape cannot be overstated". Jeff Mezydlo of Yardbarker wrote, "When it comes to emo royalty, Austin, Texas' Mineral is sitting at the head table."

== Members ==
- Chris Simpson – vocals and guitar
- Scott McCarver – guitar
- Jeremy Gomez – bass
- Gabriel Wiley – drums

== Discography ==
=== Albums ===
- The Power of Failing (1997)
- EndSerenading (1998)

=== Singles and EPs ===
- Gloria (1994)
- February / M.D. (1996)
- Split with Jimmy Eat World and Sense Field (1997)
- &Serenading / Love My Way (1998)
- One Day When We Are Young (2019)

=== Compilations ===
- TheCompleteCollection (2010)
- 1994–1998: The Complete Collection (2014)
- ...And What Remains (2026)
