= The Gloria Record =

American emo band

- Origin: Austin, Texas, U.S.
- Genres: Emo, indie rock
- Years active: 1997–2004
- Labels: Crank!, Arena Rock, Big Scary Monsters
- Past members: Chris Simpson; Jeremy Gomez; Brian Hubbard; Ben Houtman; Brian Malone; Matt Hammon; Jeremy Tappero

The Gloria Record was an American emo band from Austin, Texas, a side-project of former Mineral vocalist Chris Simpson and bassist Jeremy Gomez. The group was formed in 1997, together with guitarist Brian Hubbard and drummer Matt Hammon. They released two EPs through Crank! A Record Company, a self-titled EP (1999) and A Lull in Traffic (2000), before issuing their debut album Start Here through Arena Rock Recording Company in 2002. While working on its follow-up, the group disbanded in May 2004.

== History ==
After disbanding Mineral in 1997, frontman Chris Simpson and bassist Jeremy Gomez formed a new band. Guitarist Brian Hubbard and drummer Matt Hammon were brought into the fold sometime after. Hammon and Simpson were in a bar when the former asked "[W]hen are we going to get some songs together and do the Gloria record?" Instead of simply going with Gloria, Simpson opted for the Gloria Record as he felt it was a better name and less likely to confuse them with a Latin-American singer of the same name. A friend of the band's was in contact with Crank! A Record Company founder Jeff Matlow, who asked him if any new artists needed a label. When he got the band's 7" single, he called and offered to work with them. The self-titled EP was released on Crank! in November 1998. It was met with favorable reviews; the release was viewed as a continuation of Mineral, and drew comparisons to Sunny Day Real Estate and Radiohead. Later that year, Ben Houtman joined the group on piano/organ. Various US tours followed, and in 1999, Brian Malone replaced Hammon on drums.

Another EP, A Lull in Traffic, was released on Crank! in May 2000. It received favorable reviews, and saw the band toy with Pink Floyd-esque experimentation, earning a comparison to Radiohead. They released their debut studio album, Start Here in April 2002 through the Arena Rock Recording Co. label. It was recorded over many months in 2000-2001, and produced by Mike Mogis) at his Presto recording studio in Lincoln, Nebraska. It received generally favorable reviews; it saw the group moved away from their emo roots into an indie rock sound. It incorporated influences from U2 and R.E.M. and drew comparisons to How It Feels to Be Something On (1998) by Sunny Day Real Estate. Andrew Sacher of BrooklynVegan wrote that the album "seamlessly fus[es] elements of prog, psych, and baroque pop and mixing synthetic sounds with acoustic ones in a way that was totally modern". On May 26, 2004, the Gloria Record announced they would be breaking up. They had been working on their second album since July 2003, however, the sessions progressed slowly. Gomez and Hubbard went on to perform with Austin's The Glass Family and Chris Simpson pursuing solo projects under the name Zookeeper. UK label Big Scary Monsters released a 20th anniversary reissue of A Lull in Traffic in July 2020.

== Members ==
- Chris Simpson – vocals and guitar (1997-2004)
- Ben Houtman – keyboards (1998-2004)
- Jeremy Gomez – bass (1997-2004)
- Brian Malone – drums (1999-2004)
- Brian Hubbard - guitar (1997-2004)
- Matt Hammon - drums (1997-1998)
- Jeremy Tappero - drums (1998-1999)

== Discography ==
Studio albums

Title	Details
Start Here	Released: April 6, 2002; Label: Arena Rock; Format: CD, DL, LP

Extended plays

Title	Details
The Gloria Record	Released: November 10, 1998; Label: Crank!; Format: CD, DL, 12" vinyl
A Lull in Traffic	Released: May 16, 2000; Label: Crank!; Format: CD, DL, 12" vinyl

Singles

Title	Year	Album
"Grace, the Snow Is Here"	1998	The Gloria Record EP

Other appearances

Title	Year	Album
"L'anniversaire Triste" (live at the Metropol)	2004	Metaphysics for Beginners

== Related projects ==
- Attention - Jeremy Tappero
- Gratitude - Jeremy Tappero
- Mineral - Chris Simpson, Jeremy Gomez
- The Stereo - Jeremy Tappero
- Zookeeper - Chris Simpson, Ben Houtman, Jeremy Gomez
- The Glass Family - Jeremy Gomez, Brian Hubbard
- Booher and the Turkeyz - Ben Houtman
- Ovenbirds - Jeremy Gomez, Brian Hubbard, Ben Houtman
- SWISS - Brian Malone, Brian Hubbard, Chris Simpson, Jeremy Gomez, Ben Houtman
- House and Parish - Brian Malone
- Suburban Eyes - Jeremy Gomez, Eric Richter, John Anderson
