= Hungry Ghosts (band) =

Hong Kong indie rock band

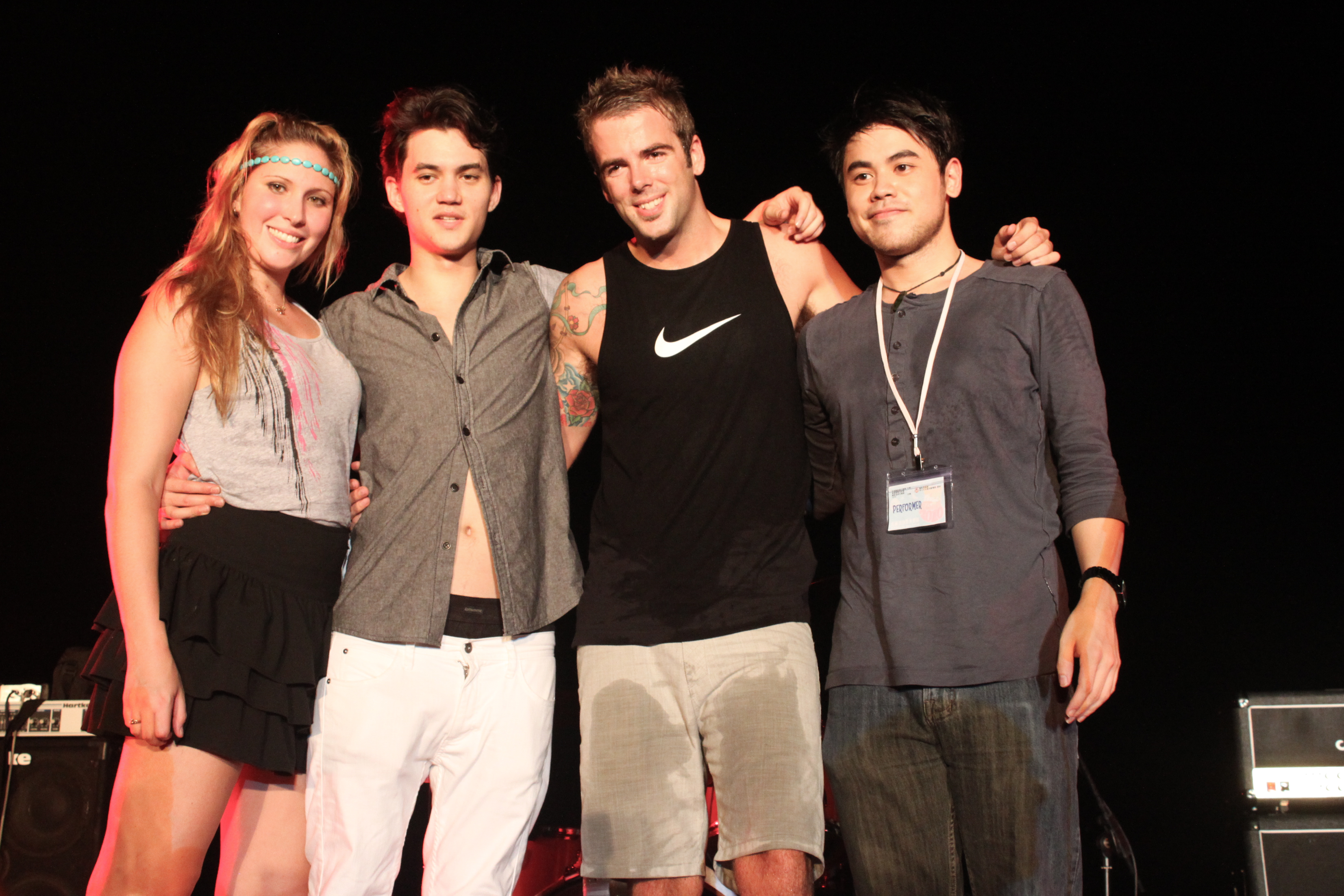
- Hungry Ghosts after performing in Hong Kong in 2010

Background information
- Origin: Hong Kong
- Genres: Indie rock, post-rock
- Years active: 2007 – present
- Members: Luke Chow; Paul Lam; Tiffany Laue; Michael Jack
- Website: hungryghostsmusic.com

Hungry Ghosts is a 4-piece indie rock band based in Hong Kong. The band was founded in 2007 by frontman Luke Chow, a well-known musician active in the Hong Kong rock scene, and guitarist Paul Lam. Bassist Tiffany Laue and drummer Michael Jack joined shortly after, having met Chow and Lam by jamming at open mic nights in the city. Along with groups including Chochukmo, King Ly Chee, Poubelle International and My Little Airport, Hungry Ghosts are considered one of Hong Kong's most influential and well-established independent bands.

The band has released two studio EPs and was featured on The Underground HK's annual compilation in 2010.

== History ==
=== Formation and 'EP' release (2007–2010) ===
Luke Chow and Paul Lam formed the band in 2007. Chow had been performing and touring as a solo acoustic act for several years prior to forming Hungry Ghosts, releasing the Fast Forward Tour EP and a full-length record, Inspired By People. Lam was working as a teacher at the time, but "had so much free time [that he] played a lot of video games and wrote many guitar songs." While early critics of the band were quick to label them as 'emo' based on the stylistic elements of their sound, Chow rejected that description, commenting, "“Emo” tends to suggest sappy losers whining about how they got dumped by their girlfriends, or bands like My Chemical Romance. We’re nothing like that." The Ghosts do, however, cite indie-emo acts Death Cab for Cutie, American football and Pop Unknown as influences.

Hungry Ghosts released their first CD, EP, in 2009, and spent the following year gigging intensely in Hong Kong, opening for visiting international acts such as Caspian, and Saosin. They were also featured on The Underground HK's third annual compilation album, "Life After Roots – Rock Beyond" in 2010, and were described by Time Out magazine as being the "stand out" band of the record.

=== EP 2 (2010–2012) ===
Immediately following the release of EP, the Ghosts began work on new material for a future release. Several release dates were announced for the new EP, but it was not until February 2012 that EP 2 was finally made available to the public at a launch party at the Central venue Backstage. Leading up to the EP 2 release, Hungry Ghosts opened for American instrumental band Lymbyc Systym at Hidden Agenda and sent Chow and Laue to the 2011 Clockenflap festival, performing as the Luke Chow Band. In 2012, the Ghosts opened for Canadian post-hardcore band Silverstein and will play the main stage of the Clockenflap festival.

== Discography ==
=== EP ===
- EP (2009)
- EP 2 (2012)

=== Compilation ===
- The Underground Compilation CD No. 3: Life After Roots – Rock Beyond (2010)
