= Pop Unknown =

American rock band

- Origin: Austin, Texas, United States
- Genres: Emo; pop rock; post-punk; indie rock; experimental rock
- Years active: 1999–2002; 2014–present
- Labels: Deep Elm, Sessions Records
- Members: Tim Lasater; Joel Ganucheau; Matt Breedlove; Erick Sanger; Adrian Carrillo
- Past members: Gabe Wiley; Casper Eckols; Chepo Pena; Frances Garcia; Shane Wells

Pop Unknown is an American rock band from Austin, Texas formed in 1997 by ex-members of Mineral (Gabe Wiley) and Tim Lasater of Feed Lucy. They released their debut EP Summer Season Kills in 1999 and followed it with their first full–length album If Arsenic Fails, Try Algebra later that year both on Deep Elm Records. Between 1997 – 2002, Pop Unknown toured the US over a dozen times and found a welcome audience in Europe, playing shows in Germany, Italy, France, Spain, Austria, Switzerland, Sweden, Belgium, the UK among others. In 2002 they released a second album titled The August Division on now defunct Sessions Records. In 2003, the 4 members of Pop Unknown founded a side project called 'Kissing Chaos' which became the primary band, and Pop Unknown was ended.

The four members of Pop Unknown that made up the band Kissing Chaos, (Joel, Gabriel, Matt and Erick) played many shows and toured the US. After releasing an EP the band called it quits.

Singer Tim Lasater went on to form The Cutaway in the US. After releasing their debut EP 'Ready for the Fall', The Cutaway – not to be confused with the UK band of the same name – toured extensively in the Texas region and the US, but called it quits after drummer Ed Davis left to play with Juliette Lewis and the Licks.

== Band members ==
Current members

- Tim Lasater – vocals, guitars, keyboard
- Joel Ganucheau – guitar, vocals
- Matt Breedlove – guitar
- Erick Sanger – bass
- Adrian Carrillo – drums

Former members

- Gabe Wiley – drums
- Casper Eckols – bass
- Chepo Pena – bass
- Frances Garcia – guitar, keyboard
- Shane Wells – bass
