= The Wicked Farleys =

American math rock band

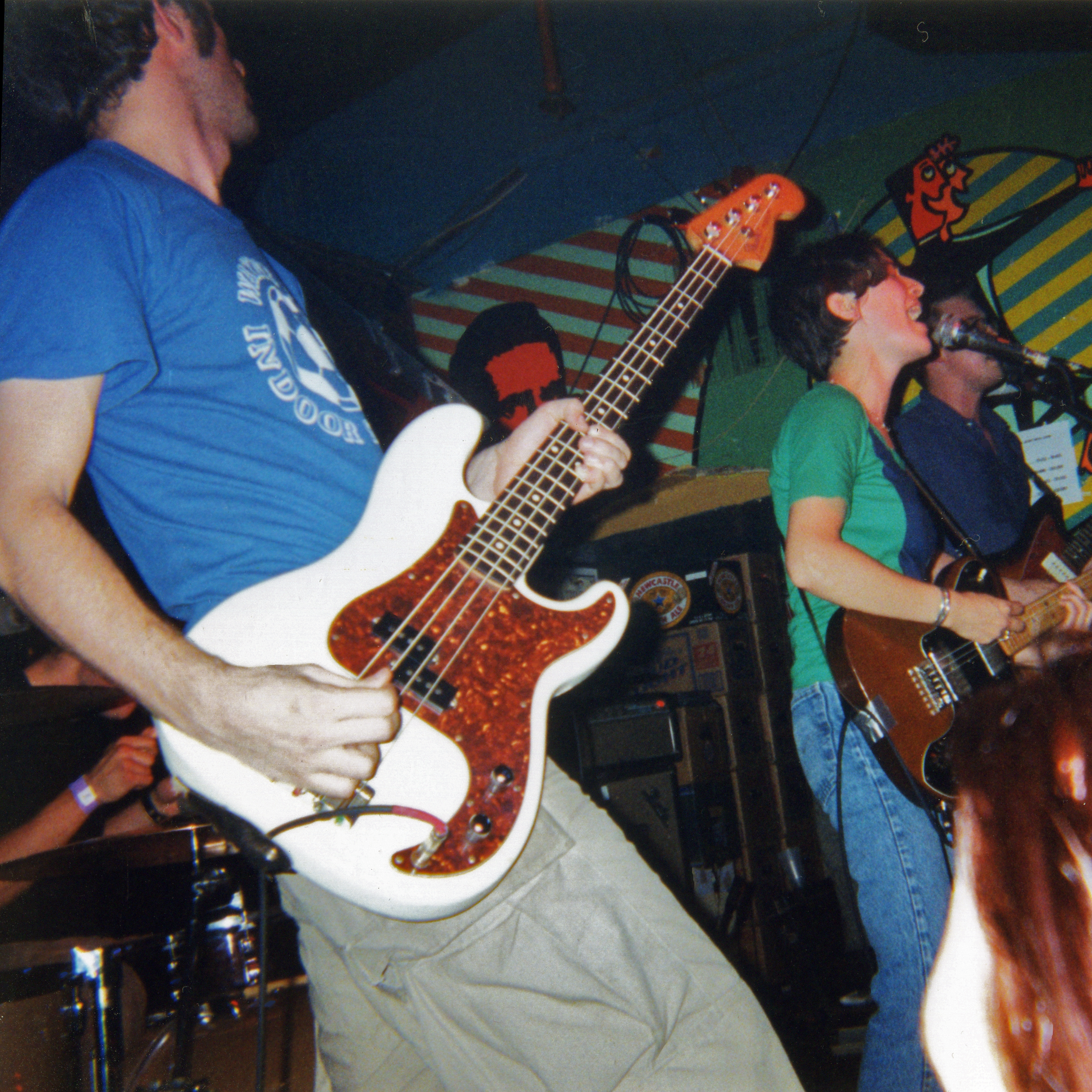
- The Wicked Farleys performing live around 1999–2000. From left to right: Ken Bernard (obscured), Michael Cory, Vanessa Downing, Michael Brodeur

Background information
- Also known as: Wicked Farleys
- Origin: Boston, Massachusetts, U.S.
- Genres: Math pop; indie rock; slacker rock
- Years active: 1994–2000
- Labels: Big Top; Doom Nibbler
- Spinoffs: Swirlies
- Past members: Michael Brodeur; Vanessa Downing; Rob Laakso; Michael Cory; Ken Bernard

The Wicked Farleys were an American indie rock band formed in 1994. It consisted of Michael Brodeur on guitars and vocals, Vanessa Downing on guitars, vocals, and keyboards, Rob Laakso on guitars and keyboards, Michael Cory on bass guitar, and Ken Bernard on drums and keyboard. They disbanded in 2000.

== History ==
The band released their debut album, Sentinel & Enterprise, in 1998. It was received well, being called "a highly underrated foray into technical songwriting and full-on math rock" by Allmusic reviewer Peter D'Angelo. It was followed up by the Sustained Interest EP in 1999.

In 2000, they released their second and final album, Make It It. It was also received well, described as "showcasing a constant, midtempo arrangement featuring progressive guitars and soft-spoken vocals", but criticized for feeling like it was longer than it was actually.

== Style ==
The band's style has been described as math rock and indie rock. The group often called themselves "collage rock" as opposed to college rock.

== Discography ==
=== Albums ===
- Sentinel & Enterprise (1998, Big Top)
- Make It It (2000, Big Top)

=== Extended plays ===
- Sustained Interest (1999, Big Top)

=== Singles ===
- Ken Theory (1997, Big Top)
- Split with Tugboat Annie (1998, Big Top)
- Split with The Vehicle Birth (1999, Doom Nibbler)
