= Crank! A Record Company =

Canadian record label

crank! A Record Company was an independent record label based in Santa Monica, California, which was started by Jeff Matlow in September 1994. The label "played a huge role in the spreading of emo in the mid-’90s", according to Alternative Press magazine. The label's first release was a 7" by Vitreous Humor, released under the name Geerhead Records; all subsequent releases were issued as crank! A Record Company.

== Artists ==
- Acrobat Down
- Boys Life
- Cursive
- Errortype:11
- Far Apart
- Fireside
- The Get Set
- The Gloria Record
- The Icarus Line
- Jupither
- Last Days of April
- Mineral
- Neva Dinova
- Onelinedrawing
- The Regrets
- Sunday's Best
- The Vehicle Birth
- Vitreous Humor

== See also ==
- List of record labels
