= The Regrets =

1558 poetry collection by Joachim du Bellay

The Regrets (originally in French Les Regrets) is a collection of poetry by the French Renaissance poet Joachim du Bellay, published in 1558. The 191 sonnets that make up this work are written using alexandrines. These poems express the disappointment he experienced as a result of his travel to Italy from 1553 to 1557. At first, he had been very enthusiastic to go to Italy because of its status as birthplace of the Roman Empire and later of the Renaissance but he was deeply disillusioned by what he found and quickly missed France.
