= The Satellite Years =

Studio album by Hopesfall
- Released: October 15, 2002
- Recorded: April 12–26, 2002
- Studio: Great Western Record Recorders
- Genres: Post-hardcore; space rock; metalcore
- Length: 39:05
- Labels: Trustkill; One Day Savior; Equal Vision
- Producer: Matt Talbott

Hopesfall chronology
| No Wings to Speak Of (2001) | The Satellite Years (2002) | A Types (2004) |

Equal Vision Vinyl Cover

The Satellite Years is the second studio album by the post-hardcore band Hopesfall. It was released in 2002 on Trustkill Records, the group's first for the company. The album was also released on vinyl by One Day Savior Recordings. The album was produced by Matt Talbott of HUM, who also provided vocals on the track "Escape Pod for Intangibles".

This is the band's first release with vocalist Jay Forrest and the last with bassist Chad Waldrup and drummer Adam Morgan until 2018's Arbiter.

The songs "Waitress" and "The Bending" were included on a promotional sampler with Eighteen Visions that was released through Trustkill.

The album was re-released as a limited edition vinyl (500 in total) on January 28, 2017 through Equal Vision Records. The vinyl was available on clear with purple splatter and limited to 400 copies, with an additional 100 copies available as a clear vinyl with a translucent blue center.

== Background and production ==
Matt Talbott, who produced the album, provided vocals on the track "Escape Pods for Intangibles" due to a bet he made with bassist Chad Waldrup after Waldrup beat Talbott in the game GoldenEye.

Guitarist Ryan Parrish departed the band after the album was recorded. Parrish did not like Trustkill taking over creative control from the band, while the other members sided with the label. Along with former vocalist Doug Venable, Parrish was the main songwriter for the band that resulted in its trademark melodic hardcore and Christian hardcore sound on The Frailty of Words and No Wings to Speak Of. Despite the creative and personnel differences he had with the other members, Parrish was still the primary songwriter on The Satellite Years. Parrish would later rejoin the band in May 2019.

== Music ==
The album employs both screaming and clean vocals. Alex Henderson of AllMusic said the album's style represents "what can happen when grindcore-ish vocals meet up with the sort of melodic intricacy that Radiohead is known for," calling it a "heaven/hell juxtaposition." Further, he compared the screaming to various extreme metal bands such as Dark Funeral, Carcass, Rotten Sound, and Cannibal Corpse.

== Critical reception ==
Professional ratings
Review scores
| Source | Rating |
|---|---|
| Allmusic | 4/5 stars |
| Exclaim! | Positive |
| Punknews.org | 4/5 stars |

The Satellite Years has received highly positive reviews since its release.

AllMusic reviewer Alex Henderson praised Jay Forrest's screaming vocals and clean singing, as well as the band's ability to switch between hardcore and melodic elements without "sounding confused or unfocused." The Punk News review echoed Henderson's and favorably compared the album to Poison the Well and From Autumn to Ashes. Paul Gresch of Exclaim! said the band "smoothly fuses influences from virtually every genre of music found in today's hardcore/metal scene in a way that is not only incredibly talented but it also highly original" and called the album one of the best releases of the year.

=== Accolades ===
In 2018, The Satellite Years was included in Loudwire's list of "11 Screamo Albums That Actually Rule". In 2020, the album was included in Brooklyn Vegan's list of "15 albums that defined the 2000s post-hardcore boom".

== Track listing ==
All tracks are written by Jay Forrest, Ryan Parrish, Joshua Brigham, Chad Waldrup, and Adam Morgan.

| No. | Title | Length |
|---|---|---|
| 1. | "Andromeda" (instrumental) | 2:48 |
| 2. | "Waitress" | 3:50 |
| 3. | "Dead in Magazines" | 3:31 |
| 4. | "Dana Walker" | 5:14 |
| 5. | "Decoys Like Curves" | 4:15 |
| 6. | "A Man Exits" | 3:40 |
| 7. | "Redshift" (instrumental) | 1:54 |
| 8. | "Only the Clouds" | 4:43 |
| 9. | "Escape Pod for Intangibles" (feat. Matt Talbott) | 2:28 |
| 10. | "The Bending" | 6:42 |
| Total length: | | 39:05 |

Enhanced CD bonus content
| No. | Title | Length |
|---|---|---|
| 11. | "The Bending" (music video) | 6:11 |

== Personnel ==
Hopesfall

- Jay Forrest – lead vocals
- Joshua Brigham – guitar
- Ryan Parrish – guitar
- Chad Waldrup – bass, backing vocals
- Adam Morgan – drums

Additional

- Matt Talbott – producer, engineer, mixing, vocals on track 9
- Alan Douches – mastering
- Keith Cleversley – mixing
- Chandler Owen – graphic design
- Joel Dowling – band photography
