= A Million Miles Away =

A Million Miles Away or Million Miles Away may refer to:

- A Million Miles Away (album), a 1998 compilation album
- A Million Miles Away (film), a 2023 biographical film
- "A Million Miles Away", a song by Rory Gallagher from the 1973 album Tattoo
- "A Million Miles Away", a song by Stiv Bators from the 1980 album Disconnected
- "A Million Miles Away", a song by The Plimsouls from the 1983 album Everywhere at Once
- "A Million Miles Away", a song by David Byrne from the 1992 album Uh-Oh
- "A Million Miles Away", a song by Rihanna from the 2006 album A Girl Like Me
- "Million Miles Away" (Hanoi Rocks song), from the 1984 album Two Steps from the Move
- "Million Miles Away" (Kim Wilde song), from the 1992 album Love Is
- "Million Miles Away" (The Offspring song), from the 2000 album Conspiracy of One
