= Torrid =

Torrid or torridness usually refers to extremely hot weather. It can also refer to:

- Torrid (clothing retailer), American women's retail chain
- Torrid Zone, a 1940 adventure film
- Torrid Noon, a 1966 Bulgarian film
- "A Torrid Love Affair", a track on a Boys Night Out album
