= Logh =

Logh may refer to:

- logh (mathematics), a rare name for the natural logarithm in mathematics
- LOGH, an acronym for Legend of the Galactic Heroes, a series of science fiction novels written by Yoshiki Tanaka, adapted to anime and manga
- Logh (band), a Swedish musical group
- Logh, the Cornish name for Looe
