= I Guess This Is Goodbye =

I Guess This Is Goodbye may refer to:

- I Guess This Is Goodbye (album), an album in The Emo Diaries series
- "I Guess This Is Goodbye" (Desperate Housewives), an episode of Desperate Housewives

== See also ==
- "This Is Goodbye", a song by Killswitch Engage from Killswitch Engage (2009 album)
