= Benton Falls =

- Origin: Santa Rosa, California, US
- Genre: Emo
- Years active: 2000–2010
- Label: Deep Elm Records
- Members: Michael Richardson; Vance Gore; Eli Deering
- Past members: Ryan "Gerb" Gerber
- Website: Benton Falls on the Deep Elm website

Benton Falls was an American emo band from Santa Rosa, California, which originally formed in 2000. The trio formerly consisted of Michael Richardson, Vance Gore, and Eli Deering, with second guitarist Gerb leaving after the release of Fighting Starlight. They landed a track on the collection The Silence in my Heart: The Emo Diaries Chapter Six, released by Deep Elm Records; this label issued Fighting Starlight, their first full-length, soon after, in 2001. They issued the follow-up album Guilt Beats Hate in 2003, and Ashes and Lies, their third and final LP, in 2010.

== Lineup ==
- Michael Richardson (Vocals, Guitar)
- Vance Gore (Bass)
- Eli Deering (Drums)
- Gerb (Guitar)

== Discography ==
Albums

- Fighting Starlight (Deep Elm, 2001) (2009 Vinyl Reissue, Count Your Lucky Stars Records)
- Guilt Beats Hate (Deep Elm, 2003)
- Ashes And Lies (2010)

Appearances

- Deep Elm Records – Unreleased, Vol. 2
- Deep Elm Unreleased No. 3
- The Silence in My Heart: The Emo Diaries – Chapter Six
