= The Hope I Hide Inside =

Compilation album by Deep Elm Records
- Released: April 27, 2004
- Genre: Emo, indie rock
- Length: 47:55
- Label: Deep Elm (DER-432)

The Emo Diaries chronology
Sad Songs Remind Me (2003)	The Hope I Hide Inside (2004)	Taking Back What's Ours (2007)

Professional ratings
Review scores
Source	Rating
Allmusic	3/5 stars

The Hope I Hide Inside is the tenth installment in The Emo Diaries series of compilation albums, released April 27, 2004 by Deep Elm Records. As with all installments in the series, the label had an open submissions policy for bands to submit material for the compilation; as a result, the music does not all fit within the emo style. As with the rest of the series, The Hope I Hide Inside features mostly unsigned bands contributing songs that were previously unreleased.

Reviewer Rob Theakston of Allmusic reviewed the album negatively, remarking that "the collection also exposes emo's greatest weakness right from the get-go: no matter where you are from, it all still sounds strangely the same":

There's no real risk-taking involved, as all of the overly glossed productions feature the same lyrical topics du jour as the previous nine volumes. There are still glimpses of originality, especially in the album's closing moments provided by Richmond's Silent Type. Emo Diaries, Vol. 10 will definitely appeal to its targeted audience, but for most people it will feel a bit like watching the end of Old Yeller: sometimes you just have to put things down.

After ten installments released over seven years, The Emo Diaries series was unofficially halted after The Hope I Hide Inside. According to the label:

Deep Elm cited the bastardization of the term "emo" in today's pop culture, as well as mainstream's stranglehold and subsequent commercialization of the genre, which placed the focus squarely on the aesthetic...not the music, the energy or the passion. Essentially, Deep Elm refused to play the game and closed the doors on the genre they helped to document, nurture and expose to the world.

However, in 2007, Deep Elm published an eleventh chapter in the series, entitled Taking Back What's Ours.

== Track listing ==
No.	Title	Artist	Length
1.	"Straightest Jacket"	Oliver	3:01
2.	"Brother Abel"	My Name Is Nobody	2:42
3.	"Projecting Power"	The Holiday Plan	3:30
4.	"The Light Is Such a Beautiful Sight"	Sounds Like Violence	4:58
5.	"Forever Mine"	A Month of Somedays	5:38
6.	"How Would It Phase You?"	Bailey Drive	4:18
7.	"Crow's Nest"	Lock and Key	3:10
8.	"Red Makes White"	Hercules Hercules	3:24
9.	"Alpine Unit"	Lukestar	3:39
10.	"On the Corner"	Latitude Blue	4:27
11.	"Friends"	Lost on Purpose	3:39
12.	"Jus Primae Noctis"	The Silent Type	5:21
Total length:			47:55
