= No Wings to Speak Of =

EP by Hopesfall
- Released: August 8, 2001
- Recorded: June 2001
- Studio: Montana Studios, Richmond, VA
- Genre: Metalcore; emo; post-hardcore; melodic hardcore
- Length: 19:35
- Label: Takehold; Trustkill; One Day Savior
- Producer: Mark Miley

Hopesfall chronology
The Frailty of Words (1999)	No Wings to Speak Of (2001)	The Satellite Years (2002)

No Wings to Speak Of is an EP by melodic hardcore band Hopesfall. The EP was first released on Takehold Records in 2001. It was re-released in 2002 by Trustkill Records and on vinyl in 2008 by One Day Savior Recordings.

== Reception ==
Professional ratings
Review scores
Source	Rating
Lambgoat	9/10
Sputnikmusic	5/5 stars
Punknews.org	5/5 stars

No Wings to Speak Of has received critical acclaim from reviewers since its release.

Lambgoat reviewer Mustapha Mond said the album is at its strongest "with passages of thick, emotional chord progression; bright, piercing, beautiful riffing done in repeated patterns; and two vocals overlapping each other, each harsh and crisp, with a sort of spiritual purity to them." Mond said that opener "Open Hands to the Wind" is not a bad song, but is the weakest on the album. Mond said the only flaw of the album was "this is not an album that immediately lends itself to a live show; rather, it seems more suited to be played alone, or with friends, driving in the moonlight."

The Sputnikmusic review called the album "the defining work of the melodic metalcore scene." The review praised the emotional lyrics and atmospheric sound as well as Doug Venable's performance for not being too complex or over the top and highlighted "The End of an Era" as the album's best track. The review concluded by saying the album "is a recording that defines a genre."

Punknews reviewer Matt also praised the album, calling the tracks "April Left with Silence" and "The End of an Era" as landmarks in the melodic hardcore genre.

== Track listing ==
All tracks are written by Hopesfall.

No.	Title	Length
1.	"Open Hands to the Wind"	4:24
2.	"April Left with Silence"	3:07
3.	"The End of an Era"	6:45
4.	"The Far Pavilions"	5:19
Total length:		19:35

== Personnel ==
Hopesfall

- Doug Venable - vocals
- Joshua Brigham - guitar
- Ryan Parrish - guitar, backing vocals
- Pat Aldrich - bass
- Adam Morgan - drums

Production

- Mark Miley - Producer
- Chandler Owen - Artwork
