= Me Against the World (compilation album) =

Compilation album by Deep Elm Records
- Released: March 5, 2002
- Genre: Emo, indie rock
- Length: 57:53
- Label: Deep Elm (DER-407)

The Emo Diaries chronology
The Silence in My Heart (2001)	Me Against the World (2002)	My Very Last Breath (2002)

Professional ratings
Review scores
Source	Rating
AllMusic	3/5 stars
Ox-Fanzine	Favorable

Me Against the World is the seventh installment in The Emo Diaries series of compilation albums, released March 5, 2002 by Deep Elm Records. As with all installments in the series, the label had an open submissions policy for bands to submit material for the compilation; as a result, the music does not all fit within the emo style. As with the rest of the series, Me Against the World features mostly unsigned bands contributing songs that were previously unreleased.

Reviewer Johnny Loftus of Allmusic remarks that "Sonically, it is a little more diverse, or at least there are a few left turns among all the quiet-loud dynamics this time around." He calls the album "Just as worthy as its Emo Diaries brethren yet filled with refreshing moments of instrumental or melodic experimentation, Vol. 7 is sure to please the Deep Elm faithful and is a good introductory calling card for many of its participants."

== Track listing ==
No.	Title	Artist	Length
1.	"The Effects That Try"	Tabula Rasa	3:33
2.	"Lowlight"	Time Spent Driving	4:19
3.	"Venom By Memory"	Before Braille	6:01
4.	"Racing the Mosaic"	This Beautiful Mess	4:22
5.	"There Are Many Ways to and From..."	Dorian	4:20
6.	"Karate Mansions"	Halifax Code	4:31
7.	"Engine Roars Me to Sleep"	Drive Til Morning	2:50
8.	"One for the Money"	Seven Head Division	4:05
9.	"This Is What I Get"	Waterpistol	5:06
10.	"Feel the Way I Do"	The Killing Suspense	4:44
11.	"Motorbike"	Two Weeks from Tomorrow	4:02
12.	"Animus"	One Starving Day	9:53
Total length:			57:53
