= Paulson (band) =

- Origin: Midland Park, New Jersey
- Genres: Indie rock, emo, art punk
- Years active: 2001–2008
- Labels: Doghouse, Initial, One Day Savior
- Members: Logan Laflotte (vocals, guitar); Alex Burton (bass); Jeff Widner (drums); Jesse Burton (guitar)
- Past members: Mike Smeen (keyboard, background vocals); John Guarente (keyboard, background vocals)

Paulson was an indie rock band from Midland Park, New Jersey.

== History ==
Paulson was formed in 2001. The band has released records on four different labels. Both Variations and All at Once have been released twice. The versions of All at Once do vary in production, track order, and songs. However Variations is simply a re-release of the original (due to Initial Records going out of business). Variations features an art punk sound and much experimentation, while All at Once showcases Paulson's melodic indie rock songs. Paulson had a strong DIY ethic, and has been played on MTVU. In 2008 the band disbanded due to troubles in following career paths outside of music.

== Discography ==
=== Albums/EPs ===
Date of release	Title	Label
April 2002	Ridiculous/Engine EP	HFX Studios
July 15, 2003	Variations on a Theme	Self-Released
June 15, 2004	Variations (Re-release + 4 New Tracks)	Initial Records
May 24, 2005	Variations (Re-release)	One Day Savior
November 22, 2005	All at Once	One Day Savior
March 6, 2007	All at Once (Re-release + 4 New Tracks)	Doghouse Records
December 25, 2007	Calling on You (Digital EP)	Doghouse Records
