= Arbiter (album) =

Studio album by Hopesfall
- Released: July 13, 2018
- Genre: Post-hardcore; alternative metal; space rock; alternative rock
- Length: 45:26
- Label: Graphic Nature; Equal Vision
- Producer: Mike Watts

Hopesfall chronology
Magnetic North (2007)	Arbiter (2018)

Singles from Arbiter
- 1. "H.A. Wallace Space Academy" Released: April 11, 2018; 2. "Tunguska" Released: June 12, 2018; 3. "Faint Object Camera" Released: June 28, 2018

Arbiter is the fifth studio album by American post-hardcore band Hopesfall. The album, the band's first since 2007's Magnetic North, was released on July 13, 2018 through Graphic Nature / Equal Vision Records.

== Background and release ==
Shortly after the release of Magnetic North in May 2007, every member of Hopesfall left the band, with only vocalist Jay Forrest remaining. Hopesfall announced their breakup in January 2008 after all of the replacement members left the band.

Hopesfall briefly reunited in 2011 with Doug Venable on vocals, Joshua Brigham and Ryan Parrish on guitar, Pat Aldrich on bass, and Adam Morgan on drums. The band played two shows in North Carolina, performing songs from their first three releases.

The band reunited in 2016, signing to Equal Vision Records and re-issued The Satellite Years, A Types and Magnetic North on vinyl. "H.A. Wallace Space Academy", the group's first new song in 11 years, was released on April 11, 2018 and announced a new album, named Arbiter, would be released on July 13. The album's name, Arbiter, was originally planned to be the new name for the band until Equal Vision suggested they stick with the "Hopesfall" name. The album's second single, "Tunguska", was released on June 12. Third single, "Faint Object Camera", was released on June 28; the song was named after the camera of the same name that was installed on the Hubble Space Telescope from 1990 to 2002. "Faint Object Camera" was included in Alternative Press's list of "10 New Songs You Need to Hear This Week" on June 29, 2018.

A music video for "Bradley Fighting Vehicle" was released on August 9 and features clips from the band's performances at the St. Vitus Bar in Brooklyn.

== Reception ==
Professional ratings
Review scores
Source	Rating
Cryptic Rock	4/5
Kill Your Stereo	90/100
Music Existence	4/5 stars

Upon its release, Arbiter received widespread critical acclaim.

Jeannie Blue of Cryptic Rock praised the album, favorably comparing the song "I Catapult" to the Hum song "Stars". Blue said the album "proudly carries the flag for the band's signature sound; oft muddy tones, gritty vocals, and always thoughtful lyrics and anchor a collection that is reminiscent of a better time" that is "steeped in melodic hardcore", but is "something much more." Luke Spencer of Music Existence also gave the album a positive review, commending the album's riffs and melody and the band's ability to mix nostalgic sounds with new ones. Nicholas Senior of New Noise Magazine wrote "That everlasting, youthful drive to create heavy, meaningful music coupled with the courage to overcome the demons they’ve fermented for over a decade has resulted in Hopesfall’s best record to date".

== Track listing ==
All tracks are written by Hopesfall.

No.	Title	Length
1.	"Faint Object Camera"	5:25
2.	"H.A. Wallace Space Academy"	4:03
3.	"Bradley Fighting Vehicle"	3:40
4.	"C.S. Lucky-One"	4:22
5.	"I Catapult"	5:01
6.	"Tunguska"	4:37
7.	"Aphelion"	1:44
8.	"Drowning Potential"	4:37
9.	"To Bloom"	5:23
10.	"Indignation and the Rise of the Arbiter"	6:19

Bonus Track
No.	Title	Length
11.	"Revolt Revolve"	3:31

== Charts ==
Chart (2018)	Peak position
US Album Sales (Billboard)	49
US Heatseekers Albums (Billboard)	1
US Independent Albums (Billboard)	13
US Vinyl Albums (Billboard)	6

== Personnel ==
Hopesfall

- Jay Forrest – lead vocals
- Joshua Brigham – guitar
- Dustin Nadler – guitar
- Chad Waldrup – bass, backing vocals
- Adam Morgan – drums

Additional

- Mike Watts – producer, mixing
