= Magnetic North (Hopesfall album) =

Studio album by Hopesfall
- Released: May 15, 2007
- Recorded: November 2006
- Genre: Post-hardcore; alternative rock; space rock; alternative metal
- Length: 52:40
- Label: Trustkill; Equal Vision
- Producer: Mike Watts

Hopesfall chronology
A Types (2004)	Magnetic North (2007)	Arbiter (2018)

Professional ratings
Review scores
Source	Rating
AbsolutePunk	67%
AllMusic	2.5/5 stars
Decoy Music	4/5 stars
Punknews.org	2/5 stars

Magnetic North is the fourth full-length album released by the hardcore band Hopesfall. Josh Brigham, one of the guitarists and the only founding member remaining during the recording of the album, has said: "Our music has always been spacey and heavy, and we use those roots, combined with our love of grunge-era Smashing Pumpkins, Dinosaur Jr., HUM, and Pixies, we add some bigger, heavier riffs.

"We all admire bands that can morph and change with each album, and that is what we try to do. Expect change and progression, in both songwriting and overall style, on the new album."

During the period before this album's release, the band released a new song from the album on their MySpace page each week for the ten weeks prior to the release date.

"Bird Flu" was previously released on the compilation album Trustkill Takeover Vol. 2.

In February 2017, the album was released as a 2-LP vinyl set through Equal Vision Records, and included "Saskatchewan" and an untitled demo as bonus tracks.

== Track listing ==
All lyrics are written by Jay Forrest; all music is composed by Hopesfall.

No.	Title	Length
1.	"Rx Contender the Pretender"	4:40
2.	"Swamp Kittens"	5:14
3.	"Cubic Zirconias Are Forever"	4:00
4.	"I Can Do This on an Island"	1:17
5.	"Secondhand Surgery"	4:30
6.	"Vacation/Add/Vacation!"	3:41
7.	"Magnetic North"	1:45
8.	"East of 1989; Battle of the Bay"	4:35
9.	"Bird Flu"	4:21
10.	"The Canon"	1:02
11.	"Devil's Concubine"	4:53
12.	"Head General Hospital"	5:58
13.	"Paisley"	6:24
Total length:		52:40

European bonus track
No.	Title	Length
14.	"Saskatchewan"	5:38

Equal Vision vinyl bonus track
No.	Title	Length
14.	"The Unnamed Demo"	4:04

== Unreleased tracks ==
The track "Saskatchewan" was originally intended for inclusion on Magnetic North, following the album's title track, but was cut from all releases without the band consenting. When the band found out the CDs and artwork had already been manufactured. Trustkill Records president Josh Grabelle claims that the label reached out to the band's management about cutting the album down by one or two tracks but Hopesfall's management either failed to communicate this to the band or simply ignored the request entirely. The label had no choice but to pick a song to remove in order to meet deadlines for an international release. Other bonus tracks may have been planned but were not included.

"We're working on some interesting things still, with bonus tracks and such for the releases in Europe and Japan. We're talking about some re-mixes too. We scrapped a couple of songs on the record, so maybe we'll work on those, too. Be on the lookout."

== Charts ==
Chart (2007)	Peak position
US Heatseekers Albums (Billboard)	30

== Personnel ==
Hopesfall

- Jay Forrest – vocals
- Josh Brigham – guitar
- Dustin Nadler – guitar
- Mike Tyson – bass
- Jason Trabue – drums

Production

- Mike Watts – production, mixing, engineering
- Rich Liegey – additional engineering, backing vocals on track 2
- Troy Glessner – mastering
- Chandler Owen – art direction
