= The Silence in My Heart =

Compilation album by Deep Elm Records
- Released: July 24, 2001
- Genre: Emo, indie rock
- Length: 51:31
- Label: Deep Elm (DER-403)

The Emo Diaries chronology
| I Guess This Is Goodbye (2000) | The Silence in My Heart (2001) | Me Against the World (2002) |

Professional ratings
Review scores
| Source | Rating |
|---|---|
| AllMusic | 2.5/5 stars |
| Ox-Fanzine | Mixed |

The Silence in My Heart is the sixth installment in The Emo Diaries series of compilation albums, released July 24, 2001, by Deep Elm Records. As with all installments in the series, the label had an open submissions policy for bands to submit material for the compilation; as a result, the music does not all fit within the emo style. As with the rest of the series, The Silence in My Heart features mostly unsigned bands contributing songs that were previously unreleased.

Reviewer Kurt Morris of Allmusic remarks that "With artists from Japan, US, Canada, Germany, Sweden, Italy, and England, this compilation unquestionably shows the universality of the emo genre and its effect on independent musicians everywhere. Compared to the rather drab fifth chapter, The Silence in My Heart sparkles."

== Track listing ==
| No. | Title | Artist | Length |
|---|---|---|---|
| 1. | "Hub" | Southpaw | 4:01 |
| 2. | "Everything's Changed" | Lewis | 6:30 |
| 3. | "Tell Him" | Benton Falls | 4:13 |
| 4. | "2:1" | Stuart | 4:28 |
| 5. | "This Year's First Snow" | Dear Diary | 2:05 |
| 6. | "Kent" | Barcode | 5:14 |
| 7. | "Flavour" | Hangin'on a Thread | 3:17 |
| 8. | "Wellspent" | Andherson | 5:40 |
| 9. | "Stoopid" | Honeysuckle Serontina | 4:06 |
| 10. | "Way Not Stand Against You" | Naht | 2:55 |
| 11. | "Even If There's a Chance in Hell" | Dead Red Sea | 4:20 |
| 12. | "Left You for Who You Are" | Desert City Soundtrack | 4:38 |
| Total length: | | | 51:31 |
