= What's Mine Is Yours =

Compilation album by Deep Elm Records
- Released: September 16, 1997
- Genres: Emo, indie rock
- Length: 48:15
- Label: Deep Elm (DER-362)

The Emo Diaries chronology
What's Mine Is Yours (1997)	A Million Miles Away (1998)

What's Mine Is Yours is the first installment in The Emo Diaries series of compilation albums, released September 16, 1997 by Deep Elm Records. The series title was originally going to be The Indie Rock Diaries, but this was ruled out when Jimmy Eat World and Samiam, who were both signed to major record labels, were selected for the album. The Emo Diaries was chosen because The Emotional Diaries was too long to fit on the album cover. As with future installments, the label had an open submissions policy for bands to submit material for the compilation; as a result, the music does not all fit within the emo style. As with the rest of the series, What's Mine Is Yours features mostly unsigned bands contributing songs that were previously unreleased.

== Track listing ==
No.	Title	Artist	Length
1.	"Opener"	Jimmy Eat World	4:59
2.	"Sunday Brown & Green"	Camber	3:25
3.	"The Last in 4000"	Race Car Riot	4:17
4.	"Stupid Maybe Still"	Lazycain	3:01
5.	"Zone"	Pave the Rocket	4:05
6.	"Ordinary Life" (from You Are Freaking Me Out)	Samiam	4:31
7.	"Beginner Swimmer"	Rain Still Falls	2:37
8.	"Hialeah"	Jejune	4:28
9.	"I Want to Know"	Triple Fast Action	3:08
10.	"Turn It On"	Red Level	3:28
11.	"Kings Do Not Have Watches"	Only Airplanes Count	4:59
12.	"Friend X"	Pohgoh	5:16
Total length:			48:15
