= My Very Last Breath =

Compilation album by Deep Elm Records
- Released: July 23, 2002
- Genre: Emo, indie rock
- Length: 47:42
- Label: Deep Elm (DER-417)

The Emo Diaries chronology
Me Against the World (2002)	My Very Last Breath (2002)	Sad Songs Remind Me (2003)

My Very Last Breath is the eighth installment in The Emo Diaries series of compilation albums, released July 23, 2002 by Deep Elm Records. As with all installments in the series, the label had an open submissions policy for bands to submit material for the compilation; as a result, the music does not all fit within the emo style. As with the rest of the series, My Very Last Breath features mostly unsigned bands contributing songs that were previously unreleased.

== Reception ==
Professional ratings
Review scores
Source	Rating
AllMusic	4/5 stars

Reviewer Johnny Loftus of Allmusic remarks that the album "features some of the most melodic and tightly arranged material that the series has seen":

That is the thing about the Emo Diaries, you always have a pretty good idea about what each new page will bring, but that doesn't make it any less exciting to read. There are a few spots that some might view as experimentation overtaking good sense (the sax solo in the Colour Blue's "Of Our Disregard"), but overall, My Very Last Breath proves that the Emo Diaries series just keeps getting stronger.

== Track listing ==
No.	Title	Artist	Length
1.	"Superstud"	Kelly8	2:52
2.	"Just Listen"	Long Since Forgotten	4:02
3.	"White for Poison, Black for Purity"	Fading Fast	5:16
4.	"Guided Tour of a Dead Man's House"	Logh	3:45
5.	"Fourth Rung of the Ladder"	Down-to-Earth Approach	4:25
6.	"Danger Drive"	Hateen	3:40
7.	"Of Our Disregard"	The Colour Blue	5:57
8.	"Regret"	The Day Action Band	2:31
9.	"No Air"	A Season Drive	3:52
10.	"Dreams Like Knives"	The Solo Project	2:51
11.	"Let Go"	The Home Team	2:48
12.	"A Mere Accident"	Slow Coming Day	5:39
Total length:			47:42
