= Broken Bones and Bloody Kisses =

EP by Boys Night Out
- Released: August 20, 2002
- Recorded: February 2002
- Studio: Sound Zones in Long Island, NY
- Genre: Emo; screamo; pop punk; metalcore
- Length: 20:46
- Label: One Day Savior
- Producer: Joe Higgins; Matt Walbroehl; Boys Night Out

Boys Night Out chronology
You Are My Canvas (2001)	Broken Bones and Bloody Kisses (2002)	Make Yourself Sick (2003)

Professional ratings
Review scores
Source	Rating
AllMusic	2.5/5 stars
Exclaim!	Mixed
Punk News	2/5 stars

Broken Bones and Bloody Kisses is the debut EP from Canadian post-hardcore band Boys Night Out. The EP was released on August 20, 2002 through One Day Savior Recordings.

The songs "The Only Honest Lovesong", "Sketch Artist Composite", and "Victor Versus the Victim" previously appeared on the demo EP You Are My Canvas.

== Musical style and lyrics ==
Broken Bones and Bloody Kisses features a heavier and more aggressive sound compared to the band's later releases. The sound of the EP has been described as emo, screamo, metalcore, and pop punk. The album's lyrics and themes have been described as morbid and macabre.

== Track listing ==
All tracks are written by Boys Night Out.

No.	Title	Length
1.	"Where We Breathe"	3:06
2.	"The Only Honest Lovesong"	3:07
3.	"This Broken Killswitch"	3:54
4.	"Victor Versus the Victim"	2:36
5.	"Sketch Artist Composite"	3:34
6.	"A Torrid Love Affair"	4:26

== Personnel ==
Boys Night Out

- Connor Lovat-Fraser – vocals, layout and design
- Jeff Davis – guitars, vocals
- Rob Pasalic – guitars, vocals
- Dave Costa – bass, vocals
- Ben Arseneau – drums

Additional personnel

- Engineering and mixing by Joe Higgins and Matt Walbroehl.
- Mastered at West West Side by Alan Douches.
