= Boys Night Out (album) =

Studio album by Boys Night Out
- Released: June 26, 2007
- Genres: Emo; post-hardcore; pop punk; power pop
- Length: 38:34
- Label: Ferret
- Producer: Lou Giordano

Boys Night Out chronology
Trainwreck (2005)	Boys Night Out (2007)	Black Dogs (2016)

Professional ratings
Review scores
Source	Rating
AllMusic	3.5/5 stars
AbsolutePunk	70%
Rock Hard	6/10

Boys Night Out is the third full-length album from Canadian emo/post-hardcore band Boys Night Out. It was released on June 26, 2007, their third and final release on Ferret Records.

== Release ==
On June 15, 2007, the music video for "Up With Me" was posted on the band's Myspace profile. Three days later, "Get Your Head Straight" was posted online. On June 19, 2007, Boys Night Out was made available for streaming, before being released seven days later. In July 2007, they went on an East Coast tour with support from Emanuel, June, and Olympia. In September and October 2007, the band went on a cross-country Canadian tour, followed by a trek to Australia.

== Track listing ==
1. "Get Your Head Straight" - 2:49
2. "Swift and Unforgiving" - 3:42
3. "The Push and Pull" - 3:43
4. "Up With Me" - 3:52
5. "The Heirs of Error" - 2:52
6. "Let Me Be Your Swear Word" - 3:40
7. "Hey, Thanks" - 3:39
8. "Fall for the Drinker" - 3:45
9. "Apartment 4" - 3:51
10. "Reason Ain't Our Long Suit" - 3:44
11. "It Won't Be Long" - 5:35

== B-Sides ==
  1. "Hints of Acquiescence"

== Music videos ==
- "Up With Me"

== Personnel ==
- Connor Lovat-Fraser – lead vocals, lyrics
- Jeff Tarbender Davis – guitars, vocals
- Andy Lewis – guitars
- Dave Costa – bass
- Ben Arseneau – drums, percussion
