= Settlefish =

Italian Indie Rock Band

- Origin: Bologna, Italy
- Genres: Indie rock; Post-punk; Emo
- Years active: 2001–2008
- Labels: Unhip; Deep Elm
- Past members: Jonathan Clancy; Emilio Torreggiani; Bruno Germano; Paul Pieretto; Federico Oppi; Stefano Pilia; Phil Soldati
- Website: www.deepelm.com/settlefish/

Settlefish was an Italian indie rock band based in Bologna, Italy formed in 2001. They have released three albums and various splits & EP's. They exclusively sing in English. The vocalist, Jonathan Clancy, was born in Canada.

== History ==
Their first album, Dance A While was released in 2003. Later they became one of the first Italian groups to be put under contract by an American record company, in their case Deep Elm Records. For this reason, in between March and April 2003 they participated in the "Too young to die" benefit tour, organized by Deep Elm with the American association against youth suicide.

In early 2005, Deep Elm released their second album, The Plural of the Choir. After the album's release, an intensive series of concerts occurred in the United States, performances in half of Europe, as well as some appearances on MTV. The second US tour leads to a further change of formation: after the departure of drummer Phil Soldati, Federico Oppi replaces him in the band.

In 2007, Settlefish released their third album, "Oh dear". In 2010 a split ep was released with the Italian group Cut, where the track Oh Dear! is contained, an unpublished song that resumes the title of the album. It was published on Riff Records is the band's last work.

It is unclear whether the band officially dissolved, but since 2010 the official website has been closed and there has not been any news since then. Jonathan, Federico and Paul are busy with a new band called A Classic Education. Jonathan Clancy also has a solo project under the name His Clancyness. Bruno Germano runs Vacuum Studio in Bologna and produces the works of various bands. The band's first bassist, Nicola Di Virgilio, is part of Phidge. Stefano Pilia, member of the group until 2003, is now part of Massimo Volume.

== Influences ==
Settlefish's influences include Modest Mouse, Red Red Meat, June of 44, Television, and At the Drive-In.

== Members ==
- Jonathan Clancy - lead vocals, guitar (2001–2008)
- Emilio Torreggiani - guitar (2001–2008)
- Bruno Germano - guitar, synthesizer (2001–2008)
- Paul Pieretto - bass, sampler (2003–2008)
- Federico Oppi - drums, percussion (2006–2008)
- Stefano Pilia - bass (2001–2003)
- Phil Soldati - drums, percussion (2001–2006)

== Discography ==
=== Studio albums ===
- 2003 - Dance A While, Upset (Unhip)
- 2005 - The Plural of the Choir (Deep Elm, Unhip)
- 2007 - Oh Dear! (Unhip)

=== EPs ===
- 2007 - The Quiet Choir EP (Deep Elm, Unhip)

=== Collaborations ===
- 2003 - Hearts Bleed Blue (Deep Elm)
- 2003 - Too Young To Die (Deep Elm)
- 2003 - Sad Songs Remind Me (Deep Elm)
- 2004 - Desert City Soundtrack (with Sounds Like Violence)
- 2009 - Afterhours presentano: Il paese è reale (with Catastrophy liars)
- 2010 - Cut/Settlefish Split EP (with Cut)
