= Make Yourself Sick =

Studio album by Boys Night Out
- Released: September 23, 2003
- Studio: Parkhill Project
- Genres: Emo; pop-punk; post-hardcore; screamo
- Length: 37:59
- Label: Ferret
- Producer: Scott Komer

Boys Night Out chronology
Broken Bones and Bloody Kisses (2002)	Make Yourself Sick (2003)	Trainwreck (2005)

Make Yourself Sick is the debut studio album by Canadian rock band Boys Night Out. A music video was released for the song "I Got Punched in the Nose for Sticking My Face in Other People's Business". The bonus track, "Where We Breathe", was only put on the first pressing of the CD. It was a re-recorded version of the song that appeared on their debut EP, Broken Bones and Bloody Kisses.

== Background ==
Boys Night Out initially formed in 1998, and broke up after a single show with the members forming other bands. The Burlington, Ontario music scene that the band came from went through an evolutionary period; during this time, vocalist Jeff Davis had nostalgia for his old band's material. In early 2001, Davis and Connor Lovat-Fraser, both of whom had played in Gym Class Joke and the Pettit Project, recorded two Boys Night Out songs. They soon recruited former Boys Night Out member Rob Pasalic on guitar, Ruins member Dave Costa on bass, and former Grade member Chris Danner on drums. They self-released their debut EP You Are My Canvas in mid-2001. Shortly after some live performances, Danner was replaced by Ben Arseneau, previously of Allendale.

Christopher Tzompanakis of the label One Day Savior Recordings had gotten a copy of You Are My Canvas and proceeded to email the band. They were unaware of the label's releases but thought Tzompanakis was a good person and decided to sign with them. Two days after this initial contact, Tzompanakis mentioned that he was friends with Carl Severson, head of Ferret Music, who was interested in releasing the band's future efforts. Severson had previously heard the band through MP3.com. By January 2002, they officially announced their signings with the two labels. Following this, they toured with the likes of Fordirelifesake, From Autumn to Ashes, and the Fullblast. In July 2002, the band released their second EP Broken Bones and Bloody Kisses through One Day Savior Recordings. They played less shows after the release of the EP to center their attention on writing material for their debut album. For the rest of the year, they went on short tours with the likes of From Autumn to Ashes, the Suicide Machines, and Thursday. The album was recorded over the course of two months; "Where We Breathe" was re-recorded during the sessions.

== Composition and lyrics ==
Musically, the sound of Make Yourself Sick has been described as emo and pop-punk, with screamo vocals and the occasional lyric touching on hardcore punk. It has been compared to the works of Glasseater, Ransom, and Taking Back Sunday. Up to this point, the band had been known for violent imagery in their lyrics, which they wanted to move away from. Davis said the album deals with "all kinds of abuse. Be it self-abuse, drug abuse, alcoholism. There is killing people. And violence". He said the interest in death and murder was a "completely healthy obsession. What better medium to get out the worst of us then in our lyrics". Discussing the title, Lovat-Fraser said they "drink an awful lot, we have problems"; Davis explained that during one occasion that they were getting high and drinking a lot: "it was to the point where no one wanted to party anymore, and I started freaking out on someone telling them to stop being such a pussy, and to 'make themself sick'". Arseneau's girlfriend remarked that it could work as an album title, which had been tentatively named Five Babies in Every State. Davis typically wrote the music alone and then show it to the other members, who would add their own ideas to it. Lovat-Fraser would then take this and come up with lyrics to it.

The opening track, "I Got Punched in the Nose for Sticking My Face in Other People's Business", is done in the style of the Get Up Kids. It is sung from the perspective of a victim talking to a criminal. Discussing the alliteration in "(Just Once) Let's Do Something Different", Lovat-Fraser attributed it to his love of Morrissey and the Smiths. Halfway into the slow-tempo "Hold on Tightly. Let Go Lightly.", a long pause is heard before it continues with a woodwind instrument till its end. The closing track, "Yeah, No...I Know...", evokes the darker sound of Broken Bones and Bloody Kisses. It is slow-paced with distorted dual vocals, concluding with off-key guitar playing.

== Release ==
In July and August 2003, the band went on a tour of the US with Saosin. On August 3, 2003, Make Yourself Sick was announced for release in the following month; it was made available for streaming on August 13. Make Yourself Sick was released on September 23, 2003, through Ferret Records. In October and November 2003, the band toured the US supporting Catch 22. They ended the year headlining a few Canadian shows with Brand New and Billy Talent; around this time, they filmed a music video. In January and February 2004, the band supported Senses Fail on their headlining US tour. Prior to the Chicago date of the tour, the band received emails from a Women's rights group, who were going to protest outside the show over their lyrics. Davis explained: "We just let them know that we were coming from a metaphorical point of view rather than literal because sometimes the message can be lost when word of mouth spreads". In April 2004, the band appeared at the Skate and Surf Festival, before touring across Canada until May with Alexisonfire.

On April 29, 2004, a music video was released for "I Got Punched in the Nose for Sticking My Face in Other People's Business". Boys Night Out spent two weeks touring California with Park, before going on a West Coast tour with Matchbook Romance, and toured the East Coast with Nightmare of You and My Chemical Romance. Boys Night Out then supported Saves the Day; on July 3, 2004, drummer Ben Arseneau left the band to go into teaching. His role was filled by Fordirelifesake drummer Brian Southall. Following this, they went on two two-week intervals of the Warped Tour. They were due to support Eighteen Visions on their US tour, until that band cancelled it for a European trek. Boys Night Out instead went on a three-month tour to end the year; they performed with As Tall as Lions, Simpcoe Street Mob, Emery, Gym Class Heroes, From First to Last and Roses Are Red. Partway through the tour, Pasalic left the band, resulting in Davis performing lead and rhythm guitar roles.

== Reception ==
Professional ratings
Review scores
Source	Rating
AllMusic	2/5 stars
Ox-Fanzine	8/10
Punknews.org	4/5 stars
Rock Hard	8/10

Make Yourself Sick has received generally favorable reviews from critics. AllMusic reviewer Johnny Loftus stated the band had "so much potential for innovation here", but criticized the "drum programming, balladry, and digitally tuned vocals", and ultimately concluded that "the album is indeed 'sick as frick', but not in the romantic sense". The staff at Modern Fix said they "didn’t want to hear another emo band any more than you did, these guys [Boys Night Out] are pretty good". He added that there was "something about this CD that has their songs playing in my head even when I’m at work". Ox-Fanzine's Stefan Klattenhoff called it a "very varied disc". Punk Planet's Art Ettinger expanded on this, noting the variety of styles and feeling that the band was lacking "one of the magic numbers needed to find the perfect combination of sound".

Lauren Bussard of Lollipop Magazine noted that it mixed the sounds of several bands, "which proves to be the best new Canadian export since… well, maybe Canada’s first great export". She said album's major flaw is the "excessive emphasis" on the lyricism as it "strikes me as a little strange, since their reckless ways don’t interest me nearly as much as their music". The staff at Rock Hard said the album "lives on cheerful, polyphonic melodies that form a harsh contrast to the snappy lyrics". Chris Conlan of Telegraph Herald said the lyrical theme of "every song is unbelievable" in a positive manner. He referred to the album overall as an "experiment gone right". Punknews.org staff member Brian Shultz thought that "speaking of one's murderous revenge song after song" would get stale, but "somehow, the band keeps it fresh by using a subtle approach to the lyrics about it". He said the album was "slightly better" than the EP. The staff at Impact Press, meanwhile, preferred the EP over the album, and wrote that it "sounds too much like Grade and Blink 182 in a metal bending auto accident".

== Track listing ==
All lyrics are written by Jeff Davis and Connor Lovat-Fraser; all music is composed by Boys Night Out.

No.	Title	Length
1.	"I Got Punched in the Nose for Sticking My Face in Other People's Business"	3:58
2.	"(Just Once) Let's Do Something Different"	3:27
3.	"The First Time It Shouldn't Taste Like Blood"	2:58
4.	"It's Dylan, You Know the Drill"	3:34
5.	"Hold on Tightly. Let Go Lightly."	2:54
6.	"The Subtleties That Make Mass Murderers Out of Otherwise Decent Human Beings"	3:46
7.	"The Fine Art of Making It Out Alive"	4:37
8.	"I Was the Devil for One Afternoon"	3:18
9.	"The Anatomy of the Journey"	2:45
10.	"Yeah, No...I Know..."	6:42
Total length:		37:59

Japanese Enhanced Content Bonus Track
No.	Title	Length
11.	"I Got Punched in the Nose for Sticking My Face in Other People's Business" (music video)	4:21

== Personnel ==
Boys Night Out

- Dave Costa - bass
- Jeff Davis - guitar, vocals
- Connor Lovat-Fraser - vocals
- Ben Arseneau - drums
- Rob Pasalic - guitar, vocals

Additional personnel

- Backup vocals on Track 9 were provided by Scott Komer.
- Group vocals on Track 9 were provided by Joan Komer and The Women of the St. Stephens United Church Choir.
- Additional vocals on Track 5 were provided by Adam Mansbridge.
- Additional keyboards by Scott Komer, Connor Lovat-Fraser and Rob Pasalic.
- Programming on Track 5 by Connor Lovat-Fraser.
