= Love You to Death (band) =

Canadian pop punk band

- Also known as: The Pettit Project (1999–2008)
- Origin: Toronto, Ontario, Canada
- Genres: Pop punk, power pop
- Years active: 1999–2015
- Labels: Affluence Music Group, Scarlet Records
- Past members: Scott Komer, Christine "Tuba" Wallis, Sam Guaiana, Paul Shields, Alison "the ton" Morris, Connor Lovat-Fraser, Mark Speer, Gregory Perets, Bob Anderson, Dave Partridge, Jeff Davis, Charles Moniz, Neil Hamilton, Fatty McGinty, Dave Palmer, Liam Killeen, Matt McCausland, Shawn Butchart, Corey Wood, Dave Thomas, Hugo Troccoli
- Website: www.loveyoutodeath.com

Love You to Death (formerly The Pettit Project) was a Canadian pop punk band from Toronto, Ontario, active from 1999 to 2015. Founded by vocalist, guitarist, and songwriter Scott Komer, the group was signed to Affluence Music Group. Over sixteen years, the band released fifteen recordings under both names and developed a rotating cast of members that included future participants in Boys Night Out, Avril Lavigne's touring band, Not by Choice, Cuff the Duke, The Creepshow, and Gregory Pepper's solo project.

== History ==
=== As The Pettit Project (1999–2008) ===
The Pettit Project was founded by Komer in 1999. The band appeared on the Drive-Thru Records stage of the Vans Warped Tour in 2002 and shared bills with acts including Fefe Dobson and Hellogoodbye.

The band's songs were featured on the Canadian teen drama Radio Free Roscoe, and the show's producers wrote the season 2 episode "These Bossy Boots are Made for Walking" (2004) around a guest appearance by the band as themselves. In March 2005, the Pettit Project performed at the Family Channel's "Spring Break-Out Bash" at Vancouver's Commodore Ballroom to celebrate the launch of the Music from Radio Free Roscoe, Volume 1 compilation CD; in promotion for the event, the band was described as "a 6 piece, 3 singer upbeat pop band" who wrote "3-minute pop rock songs about love, heartbreak and video games".

The group's 2006 album 6 Week Summer Vacation in Hell, released on Scarlet Records, received a negative review from Sam Sutherland in Exclaim!, who nonetheless acknowledged that the band had been "one of the most unique bright lights in the whole Southern Ontario punk scene". They toured with Hedley in 2006.

The band had close ties to the southern Ontario punk scene. Silverstein frontman Shane Told later recalled that the Pettit Project were "probably our best friends" during the era, and noted that their bassist Charles Moniz subsequently joined Avril Lavigne's band — a position Told himself had been offered and twice declined.

=== As Love You to Death (2008–2015) ===
In February 2008, the band changed their name to Love You to Death, prompted by the persistent mispronunciation and misspelling of their original name (commonly rendered as "Petite Project"). They had previously acknowledged the problem with their 2004 holiday EP All The Pettit Project Wants for Christmas is for People to Stop Calling Them 'Petite Project'.

Under the new name, the band continued to release albums including Recipe for a Ghost (2010), The Day I Lost Everything (2011), and If You Want to Make God LOL, Text Him Your Plans (2013). Love You to Death opened for Silverstein at the El Mocambo in March 2010 during the recording sessions for Silverstein's live album Decade (Live at the El Mocambo).

The band announced their breakup in November 2015, releasing a final EP titled Our Final Release 'Cause Paul's Dead.

=== Reunion and aftermath ===
In July 2014, Komer reunited with former Pettit Project members Morris and Boys Night Out vocalist Connor Lovat-Fraser, alongside drummer Sam Guaiana and bassist Paul Shields, to record a live-off-the-floor album under the Pettit Project name. The resulting album, The Secret Diary of Allan's Kid, featuring songs from the band's early years, was released in August 2016.

Komer and Guaiana subsequently formed the Toronto punk band Terror Ruins Birthdays with former Pettit Project guitarist Bob Anderson.

== Discography ==
=== Albums ===
- cheROCKracy (2004; as The Pettit Project)

1. "3 Cheers 4 Me"
2. "Used (to be alone)"
3. "99 Lives"
4. "When Scott Got Dumped"
5. "Cutie Stalker McCutie-Stalk"
6. "I'll Bury You at Makeout Creek"
7. "Autobot Lovesong"
8. "Girlington"

- 6 Week Summer Vacation in Hell (2006; as The Pettit Project)

1. "Wishingly Waiting Patiently"
2. "Gonna Leave You in the Summertime"
3. "Time Apart"
4. "Heartbroken"
5. "Everytime, Girl o' Mine"
6. "The Sad Clown"
7. "A Life Divine"
8. "NYC"
9. "Not Perfect Is Me"
10. "Lauren (I Will Wait for You)"
11. "Perfect Summer"

- Super Awesome Best Party (2007)

1. "Mr. Obvious"
2. "Love Is in the Air"
3. "Second Chances"
4. "For Miles in Denial"
5. "LOV"
6. "Get Me the Rock Outta Here"
7. "Me Moving on from Me"
8. "Left on McCraney"
9. "I'm Down with That"
10. "If I Had a Dime"
11. "Disclaimer!"
12. "Pretty City, Bad Times"

- Recipe for a Ghost (2010)

1. "That's What Girls Do"
2. "Just a Little Booty (2 Terms of Endearment)"
3. "I Once Had"
4. "There's a Big F'in Elephant in the Room"
5. "Caught You Staring"
6. "Your Dedication"
7. "It's Part of Me"
8. "A Rebound Shouldn't Last Long"
9. "September 4th"
10. "Saturday Sat Alone"
11. "I Rule You Suck"

- The Day I Lost Everything (2011)

1. "(Second Chances For) Second Chances"
2. "Do You"
3. "Disappear Here"
4. "Only Happy When I'm Not"
5. "I'm Spoken For"
6. "Groundhog Day"
7. "So Damn Cute"
8. "I Don't Think That This Will Happen"
9. "Back in 9th Grade"
10. "Francis"
11. "She Doesn't Believe M'words"

- If You Want to Make God LOL, Text Him Your Plans (2013)

1. "Beacon, Lighthouse, Marco Polo"
2. "Throwdown!"
3. "Jack and Jager"
4. "Kickin' Ass and Rippin' Throats"
5. "Finishing Moves (ft. Deshaun Clarke)"
6. "You Make Me Stupid"
7. "Inside"
8. "NowHere"
9. "We'll Shout For You"
10. "Sweet Picture Frame, Babe"
11. "Armed and Dangerous"

- The Secret Diary of Allan's Kid (2016; as The Pettit Project)

1. "As Soon As We're Back Home"
2. "You're Champagne, and I'm Shiznit"
3. "I'll Bury You at Makeout Creek"
4. "Used (To Being Alone)"
5. "Even If You Don't"
6. "Katie"
7. "Simple Song, Simple Plan"
8. "Bury Me at Makeout Creek"
9. "Scott And Connor Are Both Dorks"
10. "When Scott Got Dumped"
11. "Guess I Gotta Guess"
12. "Oh, I'll Get Her Alright"

=== EPs and other releases ===
- The Secret Diary of Allen (2000; as The Pettit Project; demo)
- We Need Money for Gas on Tour (2001; as The Pettit Project)
- All The Pettit Project Wants for Christmas is for People to Stop Calling Them 'Petite Project' (2004; as The Pettit Project)

1. "Mistletopriation of Funds"
2. "Stupid Christmas Song"
3. "How Do You Giftwrap a Young Boy's First Broken Heart?"
4. "Disclaimer! (demo)"

- Free Dating Service (2006; as The Pettit Project)
- R.I.P., Cupcake (2008)

1. "Jump, Baby"
2. "99 Lives"
3. "What I Want"
4. "Guess I Gotta Guess"
5. "Fully Aware, Fully Prepared"
6. "Oh, I'll Get Her Alright"

- I Love Kissing You (2015)
- Our Final Release 'Cause Paul's Dead (2015)

== Band members ==
=== Past members ===
- Scott Komer – vocals, guitar
- Christine "Tuba" Wallis – keytar, vocals
- Sam Guaiana – drums
- Paul Shields – bass, vocals
- Alison "the ton" Morris – vocals, keyboards
- Connor Lovat-Fraser – vocals, guitar (also vocalist for Boys Night Out)
- Mark Speer – vocals, guitar
- Gregory Perets – vocals, guitar (later known as Gregory Pepper)
- Bob Anderson – guitar
- Dave Partridge – vocals, guitar
- Jeff Davis – bass (also guitarist for Boys Night Out)
- Charles Moniz – bass (also bassist for Avril Lavigne)
- Neil Hamilton – bass
- Fatty McGinty – keyboards (also keyboardist for The Creepshow)
- Dave Palmer – bass
- Liam Killeen – drums (also drummer for Not by Choice)
- Matt McCausland – drums
- Shawn Butchart – drums
- Corey Wood – drums (also drummer for Cuff the Duke)
- Dave Thomas – keyboards, vocals
- Hugo Troccoli – keyboards, vocals

== See also ==
- Boys Night Out
- Not by Choice
