= The Emo Diaries =

Series of compilation albums

The Emo Diaries is a series of thirteen compilation albums released by Deep Elm Records between 1997 and 2025. The series had an open submissions policy and featured mostly acts that were unsigned at the time of the albums' releases. Deep Elm founder John Szuch claims that the original name for the series was intended to be The Indie Rock Diaries, but this was ruled out by the fact that the first volume included Jimmy Eat World and Samiam, who were both signed to major record labels. The Emo Diaries was chosen because The Emotional Diaries was too long to fit on the album cover. Despite the title, the bands featured in the series have a diversity of sounds that do not all necessarily fit into the emo style of rock music. Andy Greenwald, in his book Nothing Feels Good: Punk Rock, Teenagers, and Emo, claims that the series "stake[s] a claim for emo as more a shared aesthetic than a genre":

[T]he bands included hail from all over the world, and the musical styles range from racing punk to droopy, noodley electro. Still, the prevalence of the series—coupled with its maudlin subtitles (The Silence [in] My Heart, I Guess This Is Goodbye) and manic-depressive tattoo cover art—did much to codify the word "emo" and spread it to all corners of the underground.

Deep Elm themselves have remarked that the series's open submissions policy and diversity of bands is what made it unique: "Only the music mattered. Deep Elm has never attempted to define any musical style, as we believe any combination of songwriting, lyrics and live performance means something different to every listener." The Emo Diaries featured then-new and unreleased music by such notable acts as The Appleseed Cast, Brandtson, Further Seems Forever, Jejune, Jimmy Eat World, The Movielife, Planes Mistaken for Stars, Samiam, and Seven Storey Mountain. Ten installments were released between 1997 and 2004, after which the series was unofficially halted. According to the label:

Deep Elm cited the bastardization of the term "emo" in today's pop culture, as well as mainstream's stranglehold and subsequent commercialization of the genre, which placed the focus squarely on the aesthetic...not the music, the energy or the passion. Essentially, Deep Elm refused to play the game and closed the doors on the genre they helped to document, nurture and expose to the world.

However, in 2007 the label published an eleventh chapter in the series, entitled Taking Back What's Ours. In April 2010, Deep Elm began soliciting submissions for a twelfth installment of The Emo Diaries, which was released in January 2011 as I Love You But in the End I Will Destroy You.

In late 2025, Deep Elm released the 13th chapter of the series named, Confessions of a Broken Man

== Discography ==
Year	Chapter	Title
1997	1	What's Mine Is Yours
1998	2	A Million Miles Away
1999	3	The Moment of Truth
1999	4	An Ocean of Doubt
2000	5	I Guess This Is Goodbye
2001	6	The Silence in My Heart
2002	7	Me Against the World
2002	8	My Very Last Breath
2003	9	Sad Songs Remind Me
2004	10	The Hope I Hide Inside
2007	11	Taking Back What's Ours
2011	12	I Love You But In the End I Will Destroy You
2025	13	Confessions of a Broken Man
