= This Afternoon's Malady =

Studio album by Jejune
- Released: October 13, 1998
- Recorded: February 1998
- Studio: Salad Days (Boston, Massachusetts)
- Genre: Emo; shoegaze; indie pop
- Length: 55:01
- Label: Big Wheel Recreation; The Numero Group
- Producer: Ted Leo; Jejune

Jejune chronology
Junk (1997)	This Afternoon's Malady (1998)	R.I.P. (2000)

This Afternoon's Malady is the second studio album by American rock band Jejune, released in 1998. Alongside their debut album Junk, The Numero Group reissued Malady in late 2025.

== Style ==
Malady is considered a fusion of emo, shoegaze, and indie pop, with Britpop and classic rock sounds seen as well.

== Reception ==
Professional ratings
Review scores
Source	Rating
AllMusic	2.5/5 stars
The Independent	3/5 stars
Ox-Fanzine	Favorable

Despite mixed reception from fans and critics at the time, Malady has since been viewed positively. In 2014, Alternative Press saw its sound carry into the bands of the shoegaze resurgence around that time, such as Pity Sex. In 2020, Vulture writer Brad Nelson dubbed Malady an album that "precious few records resemble". He called its songs "emblematic of the omnivorousness of mid-’90s emo: Every few minutes, they seem to open onto a new space and sound." The site placed its title track #99 on their list of emo's all-time best songs.

== Track listing ==
No.	Title	Length
1.	"Morale Is Low"	4:02
2.	"Coping With Senility (Lowlife Owns A Pen)"	6:02
3.	"This Afternoons Malady"	4:21
4.	"Fixed On The One"	4:25
5.	"Sitcom Epiphany"	5:51
6.	"Solar"	5:17
7.	"New Clear Saturday"	1:26
8.	"Regrets Are Unanswered Dreams"	5:22
9.	"Demonica"	5:51
10.	"38 Calcumet"	2:12
11.	"One Transmission"	7:37
12.	"Same To You"	2:25
Total length:		55:01

== Personnel ==
Credits adapted from This Afternoon's Malady's liner notes.

Jejune

- Joe Guevara - vocals, guitar
- Arabella Harrison - vocals, bass
- Chris Mendez-Vanacore - drums

Technical

- Ted Leo - additional guitar, tambourine; production, recording, mixing
- Jejune - production
- Mike Hill - recording
- Dean Baltulonis - recording, editing, premastering
- Alan Douches - mastering
- Alex Garcia-Rivera - drum tech

Artwork and design

- Jason Gnewikow - art direction, design
- Josh Hooten - art direction, design
- Paul Drake - photography
