= Knot Feeder =

American musical performance group

- Origin: Pittsburgh, Pennsylvania, United States
- Genres: Math rock
- Years active: 2006–2011
- Members: Mike Banfield; Rob Spagiare; Andrew Grossmann; Andy Curl
- Website: Official Website

Knot Feeder was an American math rock band from Pittsburgh, featuring ex-members of Don Caballero, Tabula Rasa, and Southpaw. The band consisted of guitarist Mike Banfield (ex-Don Caballero), drummer Rob Spagiare (ex-Tabula Rasa), guitarist Andrew Grossmann (ex-Tabula), and bassist Andy Curl (ex-Southpaw). They recorded a CD with J. Robbins in 2007, which was released on January 24, 2009, at The Smiling Moose.

== Members ==
- Mike Banfield - Guitar
- Andy Curl - Bass Guitar
- Andrew Grossmann - Guitar
- Rob Spagiare - Drums, Vocals

== History ==
Guitarist Mike Banfield left Don Caballero, which he helped co-found with Damon Che, after their 1999 European tour supporting What Burns Never Returns, their third release on the Touch & Go label, because he did not want to quit his job in Pittsburgh and relocate to Chicago. Damon Che continued to play with Don Cab, and the other guitarist Ian Williams went on to form the band Battles. After departing Don Cab, Banfield did not play in another band until a member of Pittsburgh band Mihaly connected him with drummer Rob Spagiare of the post-hardcore band Tabula Rasa. "We played a few times and it never materialized into anything, but then I got inspired and wanted to play more seriously. So I called Rob, and he brought along guitarist Andrew Grossmann." Soon, friend and promoter/sound engineer Sean Cho introduced the trio to bassist Andy Curl, whose previous band, Southpaw, was known for its complex extended jams. The four formed Knot Feeder in 2006.

== Discography ==
- Light Flares CD (January 2009)
