= Trainwreck (album) =

Studio album by Boys Night Out
- Released: July 26, 2005
- Studios: iiwii, Weehawken, New Jersey; The Machine Shop, Hoboken, New Jersey; Harariville, Weehawken, New Jersey
- Genres: Emo; pop rock; post-hardcore
- Length: 52:21
- Label: Ferret
- Producer: Machine

Boys Night Out chronology
| Make Yourself Sick (2003) | Trainwreck (2005) | Boys Night Out (2007) |

Trainwreck is the second studio album by Canadian rock band Boys Night Out, released on July 26, 2005 through Ferret Music. After some line-up changes, the band took a short break; guitarist Jeff Davis wrote a short short which would serve as the direction for their next album. Recording took place at iiwii Studios in Weehawken, New Jersey, The Machine Shop in Hoboken, New Jersey and Harariville in Weehawken, New Jersey, with producer Machine. Trainwreck is a concept album about a character known as The Patient murdering his wife, being hospitalized and trying to convey the music he hears in his head. Its emo and pop rock sound incorporated elements of progressive rock, post-hardcore and dream pop.

Trainwreck received generally positive reviews from music critics, some of which noted the variety of musical styles and praised the songwriting quality. Prior to the album's release, the band went on a Canadian tour and supported Millencolin on their tour of the United States West Coast. They then promoted the album with a slot on the US Nintendo Fusion Tour towards the end of the year, and went on a US tour with Armor for Sleep and Chiodos. Andy Lewis joined Boys Night Out shortly afterwards and then toured the US and Canada. During this period, keyboardist Kara Dupuy left the band; they ended the year with a Canadian tour. Punknews.org included the album on their list of the year's best releases.

== Background and writing ==
Boys Night Out released their debut studio album Make Yourself Sick in September 2003, through Ferret Music. The band promoted it with supporting slots for Catch 22 and Senses Fail in the United States, a Canadian tour with Alexisonfire, a US West Coast tour with Matchbook Romance, and a US East Coast tour with Nightmare of You and My Chemical Romance. The laborious touring schedule affected guitarist Rob Pasalic and drummer Ben Arseneau, both of whom would leave the band soon after. Fordirelifesake drummer Brian Southall filled Arseneau's role from mid-2004, and vocalist and guitarist Jeff Davis took up both lead and rhythm parts in the aftermath of Pasalic's departure by the end of the year. Following the conclusion of their November 2004 tour, the band opted to take a break.

As Davis was a writer of short fiction, he came up with a story that could potential be expanded in a musical setting. He subsequently showed it to vocalist Connor Lovat-Fraser, who also writes lyrics alongside Davis. They came up with a narrative that they considered would best their contemporaries in the screamo scene, to which the band felt like outliers; Davis outright said they did not fit into this style. While in the writing process, they became aware that they needed a strong female voice, at which point Southall drafted in keyboardist Kara Dupuy. Around this time, Shawn Butchart also joined the band. They were hesitant about making a concept album, as Davis explained that some people associate the phrase with The Dark Side of the Moon (1973) by Pink Floyd, and "[i]t's a very pretentious-sounding thing, and we wanted to avoid that".

== Recording ==
The band were put in contact with producer David Bendeth, most known for his work on Contact (1987) by Platinum Blonde. Boys Night Out sent demos to Bendeth; they received a message from him, asking for more demos and radio-sending songs. He went on a speech about being sold to a major label, which perplexed Davis: "I was like, 'What the fuck are you talking about?!' I called Ferret [Music] and refused to work with that guy".Machine flew from his home state of New Jersey to hear the songs the band they had, and after discussing the direction they were aiming for, he wanted to work with them. Davis knew of him with his prior work on Ashes of the Wake (2004) by Lamb of God and The Power to Believe (2003) by King Crimson. Trainwreck was produced by Machine; drums were recorded at iiwii Studios in Weehawken, New Jersey with engineers Jakob Nygard and Machine, Pro Tools operator Dan Korneff and assistance from Sal Mormando.

Guitars and vocals were then recorded at The Machine Shop in Hoboken, New Jersey with engineers Nygard and Machine and assistance from Toby Paice. Lovat-Fraser said he was nervous working with Machine, as they previously recorded with a friend of theirs in the past, as Machine helped to push the band vocally. One instance saw Dupuy think about her deceased grandfather at the insistence of Machine. Davis recorded all of his vocals portions in a single day, and "after every take my head was swimming. I thought I was going to barf". Davis, Southall, Machine, Sam Hinzes, Dupuy and Diane Pacenka contributed group vocals, which were recorded at Harariville in Weehawken and engineered by Rob Harari. Recording sessions overall lasted for a month. Machine then mixed the recordings with Nygard serving as Pro Tools operator. Dan Nigro of As Tall as Lions offered guest vocals on "Composing".

== Composition and lyrics ==
=== Music and plot ===
Musically, the sound of the album has been described as emo and pop rock, with elements of progressive rock, post-hardcore and dream pop. The concept album's story begins with the protagonist known as The Patient, who kills his wife while having a nightmare. Punknews.org staff member Brian Shultz wrote that The Patient then "seeks to create the song stuck in his mind created by medication, prescribed in the first place to fill the 'holes' and imminent loneliness following the murder". Julie Seabaugh of Riverfront Times said it stars a "guilt-stricken doctor, the newly convicted mental patient and the relentless songs in the patient's head alternately advance the plot from hospitals to halfway houses". The Patient is placed in a mental institution for rehabilitation, later being allowed to leave and tries surgery at home where he cuts his hands off. The Patient's frustration is fuelled by the self-inflicted loss of his hands, which Davis said related to the band "wanting to do something, but having never really written any form of real music before, and never being happy with anything we've done".

The Patient ends up in various hospitals before succumbing to drug addiction. He starts to become delusional and obsessive with creating music and murdering people. Davies says "the only way he can [convey the song in his head] is by killing people. And it just spirals down a dark and awful descent of this character". Lovat-Fraser said the album ended up "a lot more personal than I meant it to be. There's a lot of me on it. The Patient definitely has a manipulative side". Dupuy plays the deceased wife, "whose ghostly wail methodically crawls up all vertebrae as the most grisly case details are uncovered", according to Seabaugh. All of the songs use one-word titles, in contrast to the long titles of their previous album. The album opens and closes with two songs, namely, "Introducing" and "Dying", that feature spoken-word portions from Ken Greenberg. Now writer Evan Davies said this narration gave the "whole package a kinda conceptual mental illness/murder vibe".

=== Tracks ===
Shultz said in "Introducing", a character called The Doctor is "recording notes about The Patient following one of a few hospital releases granted to him". The Doctor diagnosing him with catatonia, dementia and depression. The Patient's first line on the album sees him describing that his hospital ID bracelet was the only proof of his existence. From "Dreaming" onwards, The Patient serves in the lead role, as the listener "follow[s] his attempts at recreating the aforementioned song", according to Shultz. "Waking" is a power pop song, complete with a Moog synthesizer. "Medicating", which recalls the work of Sunny Day Real Estate, sees The Patient attempting to convince The Doctor that he is mentally stable for hospital release.

Shultz said "Purging" features the majority of the "remaining screaming left in the band's system; if they're trying to convey The Patient's actual state of mind". Later in the album, The Patient is infected from a disease that he contracted from factory machinery. Dupuy's part as the wife appears in the Bright Eyes and Denali-indebted "Relapsing", where The Patient thinks he can hear her voice in his head. Peter Gaston of Spin referred to the song as a "Warped Tour-ready version of Fleetwood Mac" due to the vocal interplay between the pair. The other occurrence is in "Disintegrating", where she persuades The Patient that the only away to stop the song in his head is with the death of The Doctor. The Doctor makes a reappearance for the album's final track, "Dying".

== Release ==
On April 6, 2005, Trainwreck was announced for release in three months' time. Boys Night Out embarked on a cross-country tour of Canada with the Fullbast, Blue Skies at War and As Tall as Lions, and supported Millencolin on their headlining US West Coast tour in May 2005. On May 29, 2005, the album's artwork and track listing was posted online; alongside this, "Composing" was made available for free download through the band's Myspace profile. On June 23, 2005, "Medicating" was posted online; the song's music video followed on July 15, 2005. The video, which features 50 of the band's fans, was filmed at the Player's Guild in Hamilton, Ontario. On July 25, 2005, "Healing" was posted on their PureVolume account. Trainwreck was released on July 26, 2005. Design company Switzerland did the layout for the album and Gordon Ball took the photography, which showcases The Patient at different points of the story. The layout is done in different shades of grey and one hue of yellow; the lyrics switch between these two colours, amongst blood stains and pills. Shultz said the packaging was as "cohesive, riveting, and picturesque as the story is alone".

Between September and November 2005, the band toured the US as part of the Nintendo Fusion Tour, which was headlined by Fall Out Boy. Prior to this, the band played two in-store performances on the US East Coast. Between January and March 2006, the band went on a cross-country US tour with Armor for Sleep and Chiodos, titled the Invisible Sideshow. On March 23, 2006, the Fullblast announced their breakup and said that their drummer Andy Lewis had joined Boys Night Out as a guitarist. The split had caused some controversy, with Davis needing to clarify that they "didn't steal him from the [Full]blast, and we did not break up the band". In May 2006, the band toured the US with Anterrabae, Just Surrender, and Drive By, prior to the Canadian tour with The Receiving End of Sirens, Rosesdead, and Machete Avenue. Around this time, Davis said Dupuy quit the band, which he explained that she "never toured before. It just wasn't her thing". On June 27, 2006, the band released their first video album Dude, You Need to Stop Dancing, which includes a live performance filmed in March 2006 in Toronto, Canada, music videos, and a documentary directed by Simon Bruyn and Matt Unsworth. In the following two months, the band performed at the Scene Music Festival and Wakestock, both in Canada. In September and October 2006, the band went on a Canadian tour with Moneen, and performed at the launch party for the 2006 Canadian Open.

== Reception ==
Professional ratings
Review scores
| Source | Rating |
|---|---|
| Melodic | 3.5/5 stars |
| Now | 2/5 |
| Punknews.org | 4/5 stars |

Trainwreck was met with generally favourable reviews from music critics. The staff at AllMusic wrote that Lovat-Fraser was "still prone to abrupt bursts of shouting, most of his vocals are melodic and energetic, reflecting the guitar-heavy (and sometimes complex) tunes on offer". Seabaugh called it "active listening at its finest". Melodic writer Kaj Roth said it sounded "top notch, but the music is what makes this so interesting - you will find new things every time you listen to this record". Gaston felt that the band "manages to weave in some supremely catchy hooks" amongst the morbid lyricism.

Shultz noted the "fluid number of tempo, pace, and dynamic changes through and through". He said compared to other acts doing concept releases, Boys Night Out were "mostly to the point, simple enough lyrically to clue the listener as to what's going on while at least keeping some open interpretation to it". Davies said the band sidesteps "predictability with plenty of jerky start-stops and tempo changes. It's an album full of good ideas, but the Boys have bitten off a bit more than they can chew". Scott Hefflon of Lollipop Magazine dismissed the album, stating: "They may like Muse and The Mars Volta, but they sound like Fall Out Boy".

Punknews.org ranked the album at number 15 on their list of the year's 20 best releases. In 2017, a theatrical adaptation of the album, written by Billy Horn Altamirano, was staged at the Patchwork Theatre in Niagara Falls, New York, and directed by Rosemarie Lorenti, for four performances. In the summer of 2025 the Patchwork Theatre of Niagara revived the production for the 20th anniversary of the album in collaboration with American Repertory Theater of Western New York for three performances, June 26th-28th 2025, where Altamirano and Lorenti portrayed the roles of Husband and Wife.

== Track listing ==
All songs written by Boys Night Out.

| No. | Title | Length |
|---|---|---|
| 1. | "Introducing" | 3:37 |
| 2. | "Dreaming" | 4:52 |
| 3. | "Waking" | 3:36 |
| 4. | "Sentencing" | 3:28 |
| 5. | "Medicating" | 4:00 |
| 6. | "Purging" | 3:39 |
| 7. | "Relapsing" | 4:55 |
| 8. | "Recovering" | 4:07 |
| 9. | "Composing" | 5:49 |
| 10. | "Disintegrating" | 4:14 |
| 11. | "Healing" | 3:24 |
| 12. | "Dying" | 6:40 |
| Total length: | | 52:21 |

== Personnel ==
Personnel per booklet.

Boys Night Out

- Dave Costa – bass
- Jeff Davis – guitar, vocals, group vocals
- Connor Lovat-Fraser – vocals
- Kara Dupuy – keyboard, group vocals
- Brian Southall – drums, group vocals

Additional musicians

- Ken Greenberg – spoken word (tracks 1 and 12)
- Machine – group vocals
- Sam Hinzes – group vocals
- Diane Pacenka – group vocals
- Dan Nigro – guest vocals (track 9)

Production and design

- Machine – producer, mixing, drums engineer, guitars engineer, vocals engineer
- Jakob Nygard – drums engineer, guitars engineer, vocals engineer, Pro Tools mixing
- Dan Korneff – Pro Tools drums
- Sal Mormando – drums assistant
- Toby Paice – guitars assistant, vocals assistant
- Rob Harari – group vocals engineer
- Switzerland – art direction, design
- Gordon Ball – photography
