= 10.21 =

Studio album by Skycamefalling
- Released: November 11, 2000
- Genre: Metalcore, post-hardcore
- Length: 63:31
- Label: Ferret
- Producer: Jim Winters

Skycamefalling chronology
To Forever Embrace the Sun (1998)	10.21 (2000)	Skycamefalling (2003)

Professional ratings
Review scores
Source	Rating
Allmusic	2/5 stars
Punknews.org	4.5/5 stars

10.21 is the only studio album by American metalcore band Skycamefalling, released on November 11, 2000, through Ferret Music. The album's title (pronounced "ten twenty one") is named after the date vocalist Christopher Tzompanakis had to end a relationship with a woman, October 21. A vinyl edition of the album was planned to be released sometime in April 2001, however it never surfaced.

== Track listing ==
No.	Title	Length
1.	"Intro"	1:21
2.	"With Paper Wings"	4:54
3.	"Laura Palmer"	4:48
4.	"The Nothing"	5:38
5.	"-"	2:04
6.	"Porcelain Heart Promises"	3:59
7.	"Healing Yesteryear"	4:15
8.	"Shallow Like Sand"	5:47
9.	"The Truth Machine"	5:18
10.	"10.21"	8:59
11.	"November's Neverending"	6:05
12.	"An Ocean Apart"	10:23
Total length:		63:31

== Personnel ==
Skycamefalling

- Christopher Tzompanakis – vocals
- Cameron Keym – guitar, piano, vocals
- John Clerkin – guitar
- Andrew Keym – bass
- Brian Parker – drums

Additional

- Jim Winters – production
