= Hopesfall =

American post-hardcore band

- Origin: Charlotte, North Carolina, U.S.
- Genres: Post-hardcore; melodic hardcore; space rock; alternative rock; metalcore (early); Christian hardcore (originally)
- Years active: 1998–2008, 2011, 2016–present
- Labels: DTS, Takehold, Trustkill, Graphic Nature, Equal Vision, One Day Savior
- Members: Jay Forrest; Joshua Brigham; Adam Morgan; Chad Waldrup; Ryan Parrish; Will Goodyear
- Past members: Doug Venable; Christopher Kincaid; Pat Aldrich; Mike Tyson; Adam Baker; Jason Trabue; Dustin Nadler

Hopesfall is an American post-hardcore band from Charlotte, North Carolina, formed in 1998. They are currently signed to Equal Vision Records. The band dissolved in 2008 after all members, with the exception of singer Jay Forrest, left the band. Following this, the lineup of the band's first two albums got together temporarily and played reunion shows in 2011. The band finally reformed with the majority of their last album's members and original drummer Adam Morgan in 2016 with a new label Equal Vision Records. Arbiter was released on July 13, 2018.

== History ==
=== The Frailty of Words and No Wings to Speak Of EP (1998–2001) ===
Hopesfall (stylized as .hopesfall.) began as a Christian hardcore band in 1998. They recorded their first album, The Frailty of Words, that same year, and it was released in November 1999 on Christian hardcore/punk label DTS Records. Following the release of The Frailty of Words, founding bassist Christopher Kincaid left the band, to be replaced by Pat Aldrich. In 2001, the band released the EP, No Wings to Speak Of on Takehold Records. Ryan Parrish was at the helm of songwriting during time, creating what would become known as the signature .hopesfall. sound in the melodic hardcore genre.

=== The Satellite Years and exit of Ryan Parrish (2002–2004) ===
2002's The Satellite Years saw the band signed to Trustkill Records for a 3-album deal. This marked the departure of founding vocalist Doug Venable, and bassist Pat Aldrich. Jay Forrest replaced Venable on vocals. Chad Waldrup replaced Aldrich as bassist. Ryan Parrish, main songwriter, lyricist, lead guitarist, vocalist, and visionary behind the .hopesfall. trademark sound, was asked by the rest of the band to leave due to "personal differences" in the wake of the recording of The Satellite Years. Ryan felt disillusioned with Trustkill Records taking creative control from the band and imposing the marriage of commerce with the band's art. This resulted in contention with the rest of the band who sided with the label, forgoing the previous vision of .hopesfall. The exit of Ryan Parrish would mark the end of the band's trademark melodic hardcore sound, Christian message, as Ryan was the primary songwriter and spokesperson along with Venable, the two were regarded as the Christians in the band. The Satellite Years was released post Parrish's exit, despite him having been the primary songwriter for album The Satellite Years was recorded at Great Western Record Recorders studio by Matt Talbott from HUM.

Ryan Parrish went on to join Nashville indie rock band Celebrity, and is currently the lead guitarist in shoegaze band In Parallel.

Mike Tyson played bass for the band on the Satellite Years tour, later joining the band as a permanent member. Chad Waldrup departed the band shortly after taking over live guitar duties, and was replaced by Dustin Nadler.

=== A Types (2004–2007) ===
The band followed The Satellite Years with 2004's A Types, which had a more alternative rock sound and was a drastic stylistic departure from The Satellite Years – notably, Forrest's vocals were almost exclusively clean singing. By the time of A Types' release, Joshua Brigham was the only remaining founding member of Hopesfall, and along with Jay Forrest, the only other remaining member from the lineup that appeared on The Satellite Years, with drummer Adam Morgan having departed weeks before recording. Morgan was replaced by Adam Baker, who departed the band during the A Types tour to be replaced by Morgan again. Morgan left the band for good prior to the recording of the band's next album, Magnetic North, and was replaced by Jason Trabue.

=== Magnetic North and breakup (2007–2008) ===
Magnetic North was released on May 15, 2007. The album saw the band strike a balance between the contrasting styles found on The Satellite Years and A Types. They toured little in support of Magnetic North, and in July of that year they announced further lineup changes, with Joshua Brigham, Mike Tyson, Dustin Nadler, and Jason Trabue all leaving the band. Cory Seals, Robert DeLauro, Paul Cadena, and Joey Manzione filled the vacancies, and, along with Jay Forrest, continued the US leg of the Magnetic North tour.

In September 2007, the band announced plans to change their name, thus ending the Hopesfall era; however, these plans never came to fruition. In January 2009, rumors circulated of Forrest's intentions to record vocals for several unfinished Hopesfall songs, though no further updates were reported. Following the Magnetic North tour, the replacement members left the band, and in January 2008, Hopesfall finally announced their breakup.

=== .hopesfall. reunion (2011) ===
On August 5 and 6, 2011, the lineup from No Wings to Speak Of (Doug, Josh, Ryan, Adam and Pat) reunited to play shows in Winston-Salem, North Carolina and Charlotte, North Carolina. They played songs from those releases as well as The Satellite Years.

=== Second reunion and Arbiter (2016–present) ===
The band reunited in 2016 and signed to Equal Vision Records, who re-issued their last 3 albums on vinyl. The band announced their intent to release a new album in 2017. The lineup for this new album comprises long-serving vocalist Jay Forrest, founding guitarist Josh Brigham and A-Types and Magnetic North guitarist Dustin Nadler, Satellite Years bassist Chad Waldrup, and founding drummer Adam Morgan. Hopesfall released "H.A. Wallace Space Academy" on April 11, 2018, the first single from the new album and the band's first new song in 11 years. On June 12, 2018, the second single, "Tunguska", was released. Arbiter, the band's fifth studio album, was released on July 13, 2018, through Equal Vision/Graphic Nature Records. The album was recorded and produced by Mike Watts, who also worked with the band on A Types and Magnetic North.

On May 31, 2019, the band announced the return of Ryan Parrish as lead guitarist on their Facebook page after 17 years apart.

On February 24, 2020, the band released a new song titled "Hall of the Sky" that was available on streaming services the following day. In addition to the band's atmospheric post-hardcore sound, the song also features elements of progressive rock and post-rock. The song is the first Hopesfall recording with Parrish since 2002's The Satellite Years.

In March 2020, the band had planned to embark on a tour across Japan with Taken. The tour was supposed to begin on March 25 in Tokyo, but it was later announced that the tour would be postponed due to concerns over the COVID-19 pandemic. As of December 2, 2022 the band announced the postponed tour of Japan was back on again.

== Relationship with Trustkill ==
The band's relationship with Trustkill was always adversarial; the label altered the track listing for Magnetic North without the band's knowledge, and in an interview in the wake of the band's breakup, former drummer Jason Trabue accused the label of providing the band with insufficient promotion and financial support throughout their tenure on Trustkill, as well as withholding royalties. In response to the MySpace bulletin announcing the band's breakup and revealing their distaste for their former label, as well as the interview with Trabue, Trustkill founder Josh Grabelle denied the accusations and leveled his own unsubstantiated allegations of drug use by the band as a cause for the breakup.

== Musical style and influences ==
The band's musical style has changed over the course of its career, but has primarily been described as post-hardcore, melodic hardcore, alternative rock, and space rock. The band was originally described as Christian hardcore on the debut Frailty of Words. The albums No Wings to Speak Of and The Satellite Years have also been described as metalcore. While the early releases featured screamed vocals prominently, later releases incorporated more clean singing.

The band's influences are very diverse. The band is influenced by emo bands such as Cursive, Karate, and the Appleseed Cast; alternative rock bands such as Hum and Jawbox; and hardcore punk bands such as Strongarm, Bloodshed, Shai Hulud, and Overcome. Other influences they've cited include Smashing Pumpkins, Undying, Prayer for Cleansing, Aria, Learning and Codeseven.

The topic of science fiction is heavily explored in the band's music. Early releases also contained religious themes, though this was phased out on later releases in favor of a secular lyrical style.

== Band members ==
Current lineup

- Jay Forrest – vocals (2001–2008, 2016–present)
- Adam Morgan – drums (1998–2004, 2005–2006, 2011, 2016-present)
- Joshua Brigham – guitar (1998–2007, 2011, 2016–present)
- Chad Waldrup – bass, backing vocals (2001–2003, 2016–present), guitar (2011)
- Ryan Parrish – guitar, backing vocals (1998–2002, 2011, 2019–present)
- Will Goodyear — guitar, backing vocals (2020–present)

Past members

- Dustin Nadler – guitar (2002–2007, 2016–2019)
- Pat Aldrich – bass (1999–2001, 2011)
- Doug Venable – vocals (1998–2001, 2011)
- Christopher Kincaid – bass, backing vocals (1998–1999)
- Mike Tyson – bass (2002–2007)
- Adam Baker – drums (2004–2005)
- Jason Trabue – drums (2006–2007)

Touring musicians

- Cory Seals – guitars (2007–2008)
- Paul Cadena – guitars (2007–2008)
- Robert DeLauro – bass (2007–2008)
- Joey Manzione – drums (2007–2008)

Timeline

== Discography ==
=== Studio albums ===
List of studio albums, with selected chart positions
Title	Album details	Peak chart positions			
Title	Album details	US Heat.	US Indie.	US Sales	US Vinyl
The Frailty of Words	Released: November 29, 1999; Label: DTS; Formats: CD, LP, DL	—	—	—	—
The Satellite Years	Released: October 15, 2002; Label: Trustkill; Formats: CD, LP, DL	—	—	—	25
A Types	Released: November 2, 2004; Label: Trustkill; Formats: CD, LP, DL	23	23	—	—
Magnetic North	Released: May 15, 2007; Label: Trustkill; Formats: CD, LP, DL	30	—	—	—
Arbiter	Released: July 13, 2018; Label: Equal Vision; Formats: CD, LP, DL, Cass	1	13	49	6
"—" denotes a recording that did not chart or was not released in that territory.

=== Extended plays ===
List of extended plays
Title	EP details
No Wings to Speak Of	Released: August 8, 2001; Label: Takehold; Formats: CD, LP, DL

=== Singles ===
Year	Song	Album
2005	"The Ones"	A Types
2018	"H.A. Wallace Space Academy"	Arbiter
2018	"Tunguska"	Arbiter
2018	"Faint Object Camera"	Arbiter
2020	"Hall of the Sky"	Non-album single

=== Music videos ===
Year	Song	Director
2002	"The Bending"	Doug Spangenberg
2004	"Icarus"	Jason Dunn
2005	"Breathe from Coma"	Chandler Owen
2018	"H.A. Wallace Space Academy"	Steve Seid
2018	"Bradley Fighting Vehicle"	Tom Flynn
2020	"Hall of the Sky"	Drew Tyndell
