= Dearly Departed =

American rock band

Dearly Departed Music
- Origin: Long Island, New York, United States
- Genres: Alternative rock progressive rock
- Years active: 2001–present
- Labels: Black Tide Records (Current), One Day Savior Recordings
- Members: Mike Mallamo; Joe Rubino; Jon Cox; Jeff Bodzer; Derek Sessions; Danny Lopez
- Past members: Ryan Albrecht; Ryan Luken (Live)
- Website: dearlydepartedmusic.com

Dearly Departed are a rock band from Long Island, New York. They are said to be similar to bands Dredg, Codeseven, Sunny Day Real Estate and Mineral, and have appeared in Good Times Magazine.

== History ==
Formed in late 2001, they consisted of vocalist Mike Mallamo (formerly of Inside), bassist Joe Rubino (of Tension and the Jett Blackk Heart Attack), guitarist Jon Cox (also of Tension, and the Jett Blackk Heart Attack Earthling Massive and From Autumn to Ashes), guitarist Jeff Bodzer (from Helen of Troy), and drummer Danny Lopez (of Scarab). They released their first album produced by Jonathan Florencio, "Believing in Ghosts", in February 2003, after which the band toured and supported acts such as From Autumn to Ashes, Avenged Sevenfold, NORA, and Superstitions of the Sky. Between releasing Believing in Ghosts and What Awaits Us, the band had undergone many changes in lineup. The band even broke up briefly in 2005 when Bodzer moved to Florida, and Mallamo focused on his new band, Novena.

Recently, Dearly Departed has returned to the original lineup and become a 6-piece added guitarist Derek Sessions.

== Reception ==
Critic Rafer Guzman praised Mike Mallamo's "high, spooky vocals" in a concert review. In a generally positive review of the album Believing in Ghosts, he wrote, "Taking cues from metal and punk, the five-piece band storms its way through crunching rock riffs with roiling drums and singer Mike Mallamo's apoplectic roar."

== Members ==
- Mike Mallamo – vocals
- Joe Rubino – Bass
- Jeff Bodzer – Guitar
- Ryan Albrecht – Guitar
- Danny Lopez – drums

=== Past members ===
- Ryan Luken – Guitar (live)
- John Cox – Guitar (What Awaits Us)
- Derek Sessions – Guitar

== Discography ==
=== Studio albums ===
- Believing in Ghosts, 2004 (One Day Savior Recordings)
- What Awaits Us, 2007

=== EPs ===
- The Remains of Marianne Mayweather, 2002 (One Day Savior Recordings)
