= Sad Songs Remind Me =

Compilation album by Deep Elm Records
- Released: June 24, 2003
- Genre: Emo, indie rock
- Length: 60:36
- Label: Deep Elm (DER-424)

The Emo Diaries chronology
My Very Last Breath (2002)	Sad Songs Remind Me (2003)	The Hope I Hide Inside (2004)

Professional ratings
Review scores
Source	Rating
Allmusic	2.5/5 stars

Sad Songs Remind Me is the ninth installment in The Emo Diaries series of compilation albums, released June 24, 2003 by Deep Elm Records. As with all installments in the series, the label had an open submissions policy for bands to submit material for the compilation; as a result, the music does not all fit within the emo style. As with the rest of the series, Sad Songs Remind Me features mostly unsigned bands contributing songs that were previously unreleased.

Reviewer Tim Sendra of Allmusic reviewed the album negatively, remarking that "overall this is a disappointing collection that seems to hint that emo has run out of gas":

Each of the 12 tracks sounds professional and accomplished. Also, apart from the anguished vocals and sad lyrics, the bands are strangely emotionless. The glossy production values and lack of exciting moments will most likely leave listeners cold. The bands here sound like the wave of groups that popped up during the heyday of the alternative scene, took all the emotion and power out of the sound, and replaced it with earnest determination and the dreaded scourge of good pop and punk: musical chops.

== Track listing ==
No.	Title	Artist	Length
1.	"As I Fall Apart"	So Sad Althea	3:21
2.	"Finish Line"	Michael	5:12
3.	"High Five Hiero"	Surrounded	6:58
4.	"As the Summer Pass Us By"	Iamuse	5:43
5.	"Karenaihana"	The Local Art	3:56
6.	"Ask Emma"	The Paper Champions	3:33
7.	"More of the Sky"	La Pieta	4:35
8.	"When the Light Becomes Green"	Settlefish	4:40
9.	"The Last Injection"	Avec	4:02
10.	"Big Cloud, Big Sky"	Milton Mapes	7:38
11.	"High School Lovers USA"	At the Close of Every Day	4:34
12.	"My Picture"	The National Anthems	6:18
Total length:			60:36
