= Skycamefalling =

American metalcore band

- Origin: Long Island, New York, U.S.
- Genres: Metalcore, post-hardcore
- Years active: 1996–2003, 2010–present
- Labels: Ferret, Good Life, One Day Savior
- Members: Christopher Tzompanakis; Cameron Keym; Matt Woisin; Brian Parker; Andrew Keym
- Past members: John Clerkin; Joe Micolo; Sal Mignano; TJ Orscher; Rob Holahan; Joe Zizzo
- Website: skycamefalling.net

Skycamefalling is an American metalcore band from Long Island, New York. Formed in 1996, the band released three EPs and one full-length album from 1996 to 2003. After going through several lineup changes (mainly several drummers and bassists), the band eventually split up in 2003. After a seven-year break, four of the five founding members reformed the band in 2010.

== History ==
Skycamefalling formed in 1996 and self-released a four-song demo cassette entitled A Penny for Your Confessions. The demo went on to sell over a thousand copies and the band was contacted by Belgian record label Good Life Recordings, whom the band had sent a demo tape addressed to the owner Edward Verhaeghe. Early influences include Cave-In, Converge, Botch, Deadguy, Grade, Glassjaw, Deftones, Snapcase, Candiria, Frodus, Indecision, the Movielife, Acme, Sons of Abraham, Focal Point, Atomship, Milhouse, Day Of Suffering, Mind over Matter, Cardiac, Rage Against the Machine and Pantera. The band entered Brass Giraffe studios in New York City in May 1998 to begin recording their label debut EP. Recording ended in June that year, and To Forever Embrace The Sun was released in 1998. After the release, the band quickly began establishing a fanbase in both the United States as well as Europe and Tzompanakis formed his own record label, One Day Savior Recordings.

By the year 2000, their relationship with Good Life had soured and Skycamefalling signed with New Jersey–based record label Ferret Music. 10.21, the band's only full-length album, was released in November 2000 through Ferret and was well received by both fans and critics. Touring relentlessly for nearly two years as well as a brief stint on Warped Tour, Skycamefalling decided to go their separate ways, citing a lack of interest being the main reason. The band played two final Long Island shows at the Local Seven (one under the name Embrace The Sun in which the band played To Forever Embrace the Sun from start to finish) as well as their last show at Hellfest in the summer of 2003. Their final self-titled EP, released posthumously in 2003, left their fans with two final songs ("Thera" and "The Elephant Graveyard"). These tracks were early, rough recordings for songs that were to be on 10.21 but since the band was breaking up, they gave Ferret Music the rights to release the songs because of left-over debt that the band had yet to fulfill.

In 2003 guitarist Cameron Keym formed The Sleeping along with bassist Sal Mignano and drummer Joe Zizzo. Christopher Tzompanakis, Matt Woisin, and Rob Holohan formed Farewell Tide which disbanded shortly after formation. Christopher Tzompanakis went on to briefly front Spectators before reforming Farewell Tide in mid-2009 with Brian Parker, Skycamefalling's original drummer. In 2011 Christopher Tzompanakis joined the Long Island band Divider.

=== Reunion ===
Four of the bands founding members, with the exception of John Clerkin, reunited the band in early 2010. The first reunion show was supposed to take place at the Long Island Fest 2010. However, just before the show, the guitarist injured his hand and the band was forced to postpone the reunion show. Skycamefalling and Long Island Fest issued an apology to fans and stated intentions to play the show later in 2010.

The band did however reform, with the lineup mentioned above, at Long Island Fest 2011 and went on to perform at Webster Hall in July 2011 with Harvest & Burnt By The Sun. They later announced a tenth anniversary weekend of their album 10.21 with Long Island's Incendiary in October 2011. The band played 10.21 in its entirely on October 21, 2011, along with shows in both Poughkeepsie, NY and Warren, NJ. The band also reunited on February 23, 2018, and played a show at Amityville Music Hall in Amityville, NY.

== Band members ==
Current members

- Cameron Keym – guitar, vocals (1996–2003, 2010–present)
- Christopher Tzompanakis – vocals (1996–2003, 2010–present)
- Matt Woisin – bass (1996–2000, 2010–present)
- Brian Parker – drums (1996–2001, 2010–present)
- Andrew Keym – bass (2001), guitar (2018–present)

Former members

- John Clerkin – guitar (1996–2003)
- Joe Micolo – bass (2000–2001)
- TJ Orscher – drums (2001–2002)
- Sal Mignano – bass (2001–2003)
- Rob Holohan – drums (2002)
- Joe Zizzo – drums (2002–2003)

Timeline

== Discography ==
Studio albums

- 10.21 (2000, Ferret Music)

Extended plays

- A Penny for Your Confessions (1997, self-released)
- ...To Forever Embrace the Sun (1998, Good Life)
- Skycamefalling (2003, Ferret Music)
