= Boys Night Out (band) =

Canadian post-hardcore band

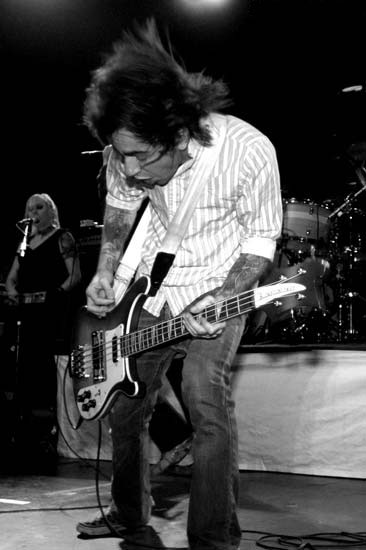

Background information
- Origin: Burlington, Ontario, Canada
- Genres: Emo; post-hardcore; screamo; pop punk
- Years active: 2001–2016, 2024–present
- Labels: One Day Savior, Ferret, Good Fight
- Members: Connor Lovat-Fraser; Scott Komer; Matt McCausland; Joe Baldasio; Andrew Falcao
- Past members: Jeff Tarbender Davis; Dave Costa; Ben Arseneau; Kara Dupuy; Rob Pasalic; Andy Lewis; Chris Danner; Brian Southall; Adam Kingsbury; Jet Turner
- Website: www.bnoboysnightout.com

Boys Night Out is a Canadian emo/post-hardcore band from Burlington, Ontario.

== History ==
The band formed in 2001 when Connor Lovat-Fraser (lead vocalist, guitar) and Jeff Davis (lead guitar, piano) started collaborating on songs. They were joined by Dave Costa (vocals, bass), Chris Danner (drums), and Rob Pasalic (guitar, vocals) and, that year, independently released the four-song EP You Are My Canvas, which was influenced by fellow Burlington hardcore act Grade. Danner left the band and was replaced on drums by Ben Arseneau. The band signed to One Day Savior Recordings and, in 2002, released the EP Broken Bones and Bloody Kisses.

Interest in the band was immediate, and they were signed to New Jersey–based Ferret Records. Their debut album, Make Yourself Sick, was released in 2003. It was much lighter and pop-punk-oriented, but with the same heavy screaming and guitars found on earlier releases. The band toured heavily in support of the record with acts such as My Chemical Romance, Catch 22, Saves the Day, and as part of the 2005 Warped Tour.1 Boys Night Out also was featured in the 2005 Nintendo Fusion Tour with Fall Out Boy, Motion City Soundtrack, The Starting Line, and Panic! at the Disco.

The band's next album, 2005's Trainwreck, was a more subdued concept album based on a man's loss of sanity. Trainwreck opens with a doctor dictating his notes into a tape recorder. The album chronicles the arrest, trial, treatment and subsequent release of a man who, in a waking dream, murders his wife and then cuts off his hands so he can not kill again. During the recording of this album, Arseneau had left the band; Adam Kingsbury briefly stepped in before Brian Southall joined permanently. Keyboardist and singer Kara Dupuy had joined the band; her vocals act as the deceased wife's voice heard by the patient throughout the album. In support of the album, the band toured with Armor for Sleep, went to the UK with Less Than Jake and played the Waidestock! festival in Pennsylvania.

Also in 2006, the band released a limited-edition DVD, filmed at The Opera House in Toronto, called Dude, You Need To Stop Dancing - A Film About Boys Night Out. By this time, Dupuy had left, as had Pasalic, who formed the band Saint Alvia. He was replaced by guitarist Andy Lewis, formerly of The Fullblast. Later that year, Brian Southall left the band to join The Receiving End of Sirens. He was replaced by Ben Arseneau, the original drummer.

Boys Night Out released the EP Fifty Million People Can't Be Wrong in February 2007, then, in June, their third album, Boys Night Out. The first single from the album was "Up with Me". They spent all of 2007 on the road, with Plain White T's, Scary Kids Scaring Kids and The Dear Hunter. By the end of 2007, Lovat-Fraser was having trouble with his voice and, on their tour of eastern Canada, their van died and they had to cancel all of their concert dates. In 2016, Lovat-Fraser said that, at that time, the decision was made to fold the band.

However, on the band's Facebook page, he posted:

No breakup. No lost members. No getting dropped. We're just taking it easy for a while. Once we finished our contract with Ferret we opted to leave the label. We've been touring non-stop for the past few years and we're all feeling the wear and tear of constant life on the road. We started this band as a means of escape from everyday life...this is a return to that frame of mind. Easy like Sunday morning. It's pretty refreshing to just sit back and write songs without pressure from all sides telling you that there HAS to be a new record on day x. Before we release another full-length we're going to take our time to make sure that it's as wickedly radical and gnarly as it can possibly be. So, yeah...that's the gist of it. You won't be seeing us playing a whole lot of shows in the coming months - and we definitely won't be playing extended tours - but we're still alive and kickin'.

On October 24, 2009, the original line-up of Boys Night Out played The Opera House in Toronto. The band played both Broken Bones And Bloody Kisses and Make Yourself Sick in their entirety. One of the opening bands was Lovat-Fraser's new band, Crazy Diamond; another was his former band Love You to Death (aka The Pettit Project).

In 2009, Lovat-Fraser and Davis joined producer Scott Komer to form a band called Hard Calibers. The purpose of the band was to record a version of ESRT Page 14 by Justin Veatch of the Ivoryton Piano Factory. The song is featured on a compilation album of music by Veatch, an American musical prodigy who died of an accidental heroin overdose in 2008 at the age of 17.

As of early 2013, the band had yet to make an official announcement on its split, but Lovat-Fraser posted, "I'm sorry to say it, but I can't really see BNO getting back together for any shows. It seems that everyone is getting back together for reunion shows these days, but sadly, I don't think BNO will be counted among them." In March, he tweeted, "Just finished recording the new full-length. Sounds like shit.". Two days later the band tweeted: "There is no new album, but if we recorded one right now it would absolutely sound like shit.". The former band's Twitter page description also states they are no longer a band though they still used the account from time to time.

In 2016, the band released the EP, Black Dogs. In 2017, the Patchwork Theatre of Niagara Falls created the play Trainwreck, based on the Boys Night Out album.

There is still significant interest in the band. In 2021, Forge Again Records released the Boys Night Out compilation album, Nevermind 2. In an interview, Lovat-Fraser commented that people are still getting Boys Night Out tattoos, and the band's Facebook page remains active as a fansite and marketing tool. Lovat-Fraser speaks of the band in the past tense and, in June 2021, commented on Facebook that a reunion is "unlikely".

=== Reunion ===
Following a social media post in which Connor revealed the band had turned down multiple proposals for a reunion show over the years as he was the only member still interested in performing live, Boys Night Out reunited in 2024 with a wholly new line-up to play the final Furnace Fest. According to Lovat-Fraser, the reunion is dedicated to honouring the life and memory of Julia MacIsaac, his partner who was murdered in March 2024.

In March 2025, after an eighteen-year break from touring the band set out on a five-week US tour as direct support for Armor for Sleep and opener HelloGoodbye. During this tour the band announced plans for a North American tour to celebrate the 20th anniversary of the album Trainwreck.

On September 12, 2025, the band released its first single since 2016, called "100% Ghosts", accompanied by a music video.

== Band members ==
Current

- Connor Lovat-Fraser – lead vocals (2001–2016, 2024–present)
- Scott Komer – bass (2024–present)
- Matt McCausland – drums (2024–present)
- Joe Baldasio – guitar (2024–present)
- Andrew Falcao – guitar (2025–present)

Former

- Jeff Tarbender Davis – guitar, vocals (2001–2016)
- Dave Costa – bass, vocals (2001–2016)
- Jet Turner – guitar (2024–2025)
- Ben Arseneau – drums (2001–2004, 2006–2016)
- Andy Lewis – guitar (2006–2016)
- Chris Danner – drums (2001)
- Rob Pasalic – guitar, vocals (2001–2005)
- Adam Kingsbury – drums (2005)
- Brian Southall – drums (2005–2006)
- Kara Dupuy – keyboards, vocals (2005–2006)

Timeline

== Discography ==
Albums

- Make Yourself Sick (Ferret, 2003)
- Trainwreck (Ferret, 2005)
- Boys Night Out (Ferret, 2007)
- Nevermind 2 (Forge Again Records, compilation, 2021)

EPs

- You Are My Canvas (Independent, 2001)
- Broken Bones and Bloody Kisses (One Day Savior, 2002)
- Fifty Million People Can't Be Wrong (Ferret, 2007)
- Black Dogs (Good Fight, 2016)

Demos

- First Demo (Independent, 2000)

Music videos

- "I Got Punched in the Nose for Sticking My Face in Other People's Business" (Make Yourself Sick, 2003)
- "Medicating" (Trainwreck, 2005)
- "Up With Me" (Boys Night Out, 2007)

DVD

- Dude, You Need to Stop Dancing (Ferret, 2006)

Compilation inclusions

- Dead and Dreaming: An Indie Tribute to Counting Crows (Victory, 2004) - "Walkaways"
- Skate & Surf Fest Vol. 1 (High Roller Studios, 2005) – "I Got Punched In The Nose For Sticking My Face In Other People's Business" (live video)
- Ferret Music 2004: Progression Through Aggression (Ferret, 2004) - "I Got Punched In The Nose For Sticking My Face In Other People's Business"
- Progression Through Aggression Vol. 2 (Ferret, 2005) – "Composing"
- Take Action! Volume 4 (Sub City Records, 2004) – "Medicating"
- Vans Warped Tour 2005 (SideOneDummy Records, 2005) – "Composing"

== See also ==
- List of bands from Canada
