= An Ocean of Doubt =

Compilation album by Deep Elm Records
- Released: September 28, 1999
- Genres: Emo, indie rock
- Length: 51:22
- Label: Deep Elm (DER-381)

The Emo Diaries chronology
The Moment of Truth (1999)	An Ocean of Doubt (1999)	I Guess This Is Goodbye (2000)

Professional ratings
Review scores
Source	Rating
Allmusic	2.5/5 stars

An Ocean of Doubt is the fourth installment in The Emo Diaries series of compilation albums, released September 28, 1999, by Deep Elm Records. As with all installments in the series, the label had an open submissions policy for bands to submit material for the compilation; as a result, the music does not all fit within the emo style. As with the rest of the series, An Ocean of Doubt features mostly unsigned bands contributing songs that were previously unreleased. Notably, it features the first song released by Further Seems Forever.

Reviewer Heather Phares of Allmusic remarks that "the album catalogs emo's increasingly diverse sounds" and that it "reaffirm[s] Deep Elm's status as one of the best emo labels around."

== Track listing ==
No.	Title	Artist	Length
1.	"What's Our Dilemma"	Fivespeed	4:07
2.	"Backbreaker"	Red Animal War	2:35
3.	"Supergirl"	The John Doe Band	3:40
4.	"Distance"	Ed Matus' Struggle	4:06
5.	"Rolling Snowball"	Aina	3:34
6.	"Vengeance Factor"	Further Seems Forever	2:47
7.	"Twenty1"	Keystone Sinatra	3:46
8.	"Valens"	The Movielife	2:06
9.	"Set the Spokes Alight"	Spy Versus Spy	5:14
10.	"Corners"	ODG	4:22
11.	"Milk and Lots More"	Merrick	3:03
12.	"Sasshe"	Flux Capacitor	11:54
Total length:			51:22
