= Tabula Rasa (American band) =

American post-hardcore/mathcore band

- Origin: Pittsburgh, Pennsylvania
- Genres: Emo, post-hardcore, mathcore, math rock, progressive rock, experimental rock, post-rock
- Years active: 2000–2005
- Labels: Deep Elm, A-F Records, One Day Savior Recordings
- Past members: Rob Spagiare; Andrew Grossmann; Chris Miskis; Justin Campbell; Keith Smallwood; Jeff Kopanic; Brian Garbark; Dennis Kern

Tabula Rasa was a post-hardcore/math rock band from Pittsburgh, Pennsylvania. They were featured on Deep Elm’s Me Against the World: The Emo Diaries Chapter 7 and released a self-titled EP on One Day Savior Recordings as well as a full length album The Role of Smith on A-F Records.

== History ==
The band was formed in the fall of 2000 when bassist Chris Miskis brought drummer Jeff Kopanic together with guitarists Andrew Grossmann and Rob Spagiare. Kopanic had never met either guitarist before the band's first practice at the Mr. Roboto Project. Within a few months, the band had finished recording seven songs at +/- Studio in Pittsburgh with Andy Wright. One of those songs, "The Effects that Try," appeared as the first track on Me Against the World: The Emo Diaries Chapter 7. The other six were released by One Day Savior Recordings as a self-titled EP. Miskis left the band in 2001 and was replaced by Keith Smallwood. Smallwood left before recording with the band and was replaced by Justin Campbell, who played on The Role of Smith, which was produced by J. Robbins and released by A-F Records in 2003. The album was recorded in just seven days at Phase Recording Studios in College Park, Maryland. Kopanic left the band in 2004 and was replaced by Brian Garbark, who left the band less than a year later. Dennis Kern played drums for the band's last few shows. Spagiare and Grossmann now play in Knot Feeder.

== Members ==
- Jeff Kopanic – Drums
- Andrew Grossmann – Guitar
- Rob Spagiare – Guitar, Vocals
- Chris Miskis – Bass, Vocals (for EP & compilation)
- Justin Campbell – Bass (for full-length album)

=== Touring members ===
- Keith Smallwood – Bass (2001–2002)
- Brian Garbark – Drums (2004)
- Dennis Kern – Drums (2005)

== Discography ==
- Tabula Rasa EP (2001) One Day Savior Recordings
- The Role of Smith (2003) A-F Records
