= The Moment of Truth (compilation album) =

Compilation album by Deep Elm Records
- Released: February 23, 1999
- Genre: Emo, indie rock
- Length: 60:33
- Label: Deep Elm (DER-373)

The Emo Diaries chronology
A Million Miles Away (1998)	The Moment of Truth (1999)	An Ocean of Doubt (1999)

Professional ratings
Review scores
Source	Rating
Allmusic	2.5/5 stars
LAS Magazine	Unfavorable

The Moment of Truth is the third installment in The Emo Diaries series of compilation albums, released February 23, 1999 by Deep Elm Records. As with all installments in the series, the label had an open submissions policy for bands to submit material for the compilation; as a result, the music does not all fit within the emo style. As with the rest of the series, The Moment of Truth features mostly unsigned bands contributing songs that were previously unreleased.

Reviewer Kurt Morris of Allmusic remarks that "this third installment of the Emo Diaries saga is strong from start to finish" and that "Penfold's track should be required listening for all people proclaiming to have a knowledge of what the term emo means." While criticizing some of the songs towards the middle of the compilation as "a bit weak", he notes that "Chase Theory, Epstein, and Last Days of April all contribute dynamic and passionate tracks to help close the album out persuasively. A very convincing and solid release, this very well might be the peak of these celebrated compilations."

== Track listing ==
No.	Title	Artist	Length
1.	"Last Verse"	Starmarket	3:13
2.	"The Past Two"	Planes Mistaken for Stars	4:38
3.	"Microchip"	Penfold	4:56
4.	"VW Keychain"	The Saddest Girl Story	2:56
5.	"Hearing Things"	Cross My Heart	3:18
6.	"New Buffalo"	Sweep the Leg Johnny	4:36
7.	"Vanishing"	Schema	3:12
8.	"One Thousand Directions"	Ultramagg	3:50
9.	"Pacifique"	Speedwell	4:55
10.	"Christopher Columbo"	Psara	4:34
11.	"Cigar"	Biblical Proof of UFOs	2:45
12.	"Pharaohs & Kings"	The Chase Theory	4:02
13.	"Right Hand Rule"	Epstein	4:04
14.	"Nothing's Found"	Last Days of April	9:34
Total length:			60:33
