= A Types =

Studio album by Hopesfall
- Released: November 2, 2004
- Recorded: Vu Du Studios, Freeport, New York
- Genres: Post-hardcore; alternative rock; hard rock; post-grunge
- Length: 42:04
- Labels: Trustkill; Equal Vision
- Producers: Steven Haigler; Mike Watts

Hopesfall chronology
The Satellite Years (2002)	A Types (2004)	Magnetic North (2007)

Singles from A Types
- 1. "Icarus" Released: 2004; 2. "Breathe from Coma" Released: 2005

Professional ratings
Review scores
Source	Rating
Classic Rock	2/5 stars
Decoy Music	4/5 stars
Punknews.org	2/5 stars

A Types is the third full-length album released by the post-hardcore band Hopesfall. The musical direction of this album deviated vastly from their hardcore roots, instead opting for a more rock-oriented sound.

On January 28, 2017, the album was released on vinyl through Equal Vision Records.

== Track listing ==
No.	Title	Length
1.	"It Happens"	4:13
2.	"Start & Pause"	3:06
3.	"Icarus"	4:18
4.	"Breathe from Coma"	4:37
5.	"Champion Beyond Blessing"	3:38
6.	"The Ones"	4:39
7.	"Manipulate the Eclipse"	4:38
8.	"Matchmaker's Haven"	3:27
9.	"Owl"	3:43
10.	"Per Sempre Marciamo"	5:45
Total length:		42:04

Japanese release bonus tracks
No.	Title	Length
11.	"Start & Pause" (live)	3:06
12.	"Waitress" (live)	3:39

== Charts ==
Chart (2004)	Peak position
US Heatseekers Albums (Billboard)	23
US Independent Albums (Billboard)	23

== Personnel ==
- Jay Forrest – lead vocals
- Joshua Brigham – guitar
- Dustin Nadler – guitar
- Mike Tyson – bass
- Adam Baker – drums
