= Jejune =

American emo band

- Origin: Boston, Massachusetts
- Genres: Emo, alternative rock, indie rock
- Years active: 1996–2000, 2026–present
- Labels: Montalban Hotel, Big Wheel Recreation, Iodine Recordings, Numero Group
- Members: Arabella Harrison; Joe Guevara; Chris Vanacore
- Past members: Mark Murino

Jejune is an American emo band formed in 1996 at Berklee College of Music in Boston, Massachusetts. The band was heavily involved with the scene at the peak of the "second wave" of emo in the mid-1990s. The three founding members, Arabella Harrison (bass/vocals), Joe Guevara (guitar/vocals) and Chris Vanacore (drums), met while studying at Berklee. The band relocated to San Diego in 1997. They released two albums on Big Wheel Recreation and several splits before disbanding in 2000, their last release being the posthumous album R.I.P., released by Big Wheel that same year. They returned in 2025 after much of their catalogue was reissued by The Numero Group, as well as playing their first shows in over 25 years.

== History ==
=== 1996–1999: Formation and first releases ===
Guevara had previously been in I Wish I, a hardcore punk band originally from San Diego. After moving to Massachusetts to go to Berklee, Vanacore met Guevara through a shared love of Unbroken. The two started writing music together, but they needed a bassist. Vanacore contacted Harrison, whom he had met through classes. Harrison didn't have a bass, but she borrowed a friend's bass to play.

The band's first releases included a split with Garden Variety and appearances on a couple of compilations. They continued recording demos with the expectation of eventually recording their debut album but ended up issuing many of the demos as their first album, Junk, in 1997 on Big Wheel Recreation. The title is said to come from Arabella's opinion of the songs. A split single with Jimmy Eat World was released that same year. Vanacore tagged along with Jimmy Eat World as a roadie on the tour after the split's release, as Jejune made their move down to San Diego. While the band enjoyed playing in San Diego, they admitted that the scene wasn't the same as Boston's.

In 1998, This Afternoon's Malady was released. The album's reception was mixed upon release, but they were praised for improving on the sound shown in Junk. The mixed responses often came from the fact that the album was considered emo at a time when the word had a negative connotation.

Throughout their existence, the band undertook several tours of the US, including stints with The Get Up Kids, Blacktop Cadence, Braid, Piebald, and a late 1998 tour with Jimmy Eat World.

In early 1999, the band added Mark Murino on second guitar to expand their live sound. Not long after, the band undertook a European tour with Kill Holiday.

=== 1999–2000: Breakup and R.I.P. ===
Towards the end of 1999, several bands in the indie emo scene of the time attempted to distance themselves from the emo label. Jejune, as a band, started exploring more pop-leaning sounds and were planning to record their third album. However, internal tensions among the band members regarding the new direction led to the band's disbandment in early 2000. In September of that year, Big Wheel Recreation compiled and released R.I.P., a compilation album featuring the completed demos for the third album, remastered or alternate takes of songs from previous releases, and a few unreleased songs. Reviews for the album were mixed; while many praised the sound of the demos, many also called the extras underwhelming.

=== 2000–present: Other projects and reissues ===
After the band's breakup, Lovelight Shine was founded by Guevara, Murino, and Vanacore. The group released an EP through Big Wheel Recreation, and a second self-released EP, before disbanding. After that, Murino and Vanacore formed Dirty Sweet, while Guevara began playing piano for blues artist Lady Dottie. Following the split, Harrison joined The And/Ors and more recently, she pursued a solo career, with Vanacore occasionally joining her on the drums. Additionally, she is a member of the country band Bartender's Bible.

On January 9, 2025, Iodine Recordings announced they had begun a partnership with Big Wheel Recreation, Jejune's record label, and included a mention of a planned reissue of the band's material as well as other bands under Big Wheel. On June 2, The Numero Group announced that they would begin reissuing and remastering Jejune's material, beginning with "That's Why She Hates Me" from their split with Jimmy Eat World and hinting at a vinyl reissue of their material. This came on November 10 of the same year as Numero announced remastered reissues of Junk and This Afternoon's Malady, bringing both albums to vinyl in their entirety for the first time. On January 25, 2026, Jejune played a secret show with special guest First Day Back, at The Ché Café in California, their first show in over 25 years. Previously, Numero announced the band would be going on a short Japan tour with Ethel Meserve and The Album Leaf through February of 2026. Numero released Wait a Lifetime, a compilation of their two albums and R.I.P., along with songs from compilations. It also marked the first time their music was available on CD since their breakup, as well as R.I.P. appearing on vinyl for the first time.

== Style ==
The band's earliest songs consisted of a more punk rock style, such as on Junk. This Afternoon's Malady marked a notable departure from their more indie rock leanings on their debut and saw them lead towards more of a dream pop sound. Some songs on R.I.P. delved into more of a sparse and electronic sound, expanding on the synth sound that could be heard on some songs off This Afternoon's Malady and their split with Jimmy Eat World, while others combined their previous dream pop sound with 90's pop.

== Legacy ==
The band was the subject of a 2010 Alternative Press article titled "Bands That Time Forgot: Jejune".

Chris Carrabba of Dashboard Confessional in 2018 called Jejune one of his favorite female-fronted bands, alongside Rainer Maria.

== Members ==
=== Current members ===
- Arabella Harrison – vocals/bass
- Joe Guevara – vocals/electric guitar
- Chris Vanacore – drums

=== Former members ===
- Mark Murino – guitar (1999–2000)

== Discography ==
=== Albums ===
- Junk (1997, Big Wheel Recreation/2025, The Numero Group)
- This Afternoon's Malady (1998, Big Wheel Recreation/2025, The Numero Group)

=== Compilations ===
- R.I.P. (2000, Big Wheel Recreation)
- Wait a Lifetime (2026, Numero Group)

=== Singles ===
- Split 7" with Garden Variety (1996, Montalban Hotel)
- Split 7" with Jimmy Eat World (1997, Big Wheel Recreation)
- Split 7" with Dignity for All (1999, Big Wheel Recreation)
- Split 7" with Lazycain (1999, Big Wheel Recreation/Soul Ameria Records)
- "That's Why She Hates Me" (2025, The Numero Group)
- "Grayscale" (2025, The Numero Group)
- "Coping with Senility (Lowlife Owns a Pen)" (2025, The Numero Group)
- "Early Stars" (2025, The Numero Group)
- "Hialeah" (2025, The Numero Group)
- "Record City Afterworld" (2026, The Numero Group)
- "No One Like You" / "The Boy With the Thorn in His Side" (2026, Numero Group)

=== Appearances ===
- A Document of Nothing (1996, Out Structured Records)
- They Came From Massachusetts (1996, Big Wheel Recreation)
- The Emo Diaries Chapter One: What's Mine Is Yours (1997, Deep Elm Records)
- Catalog Sampler Disc Number One (1998, Initial Records)
- Initial Extreme Music Sampler (1999, Initial Records)
- I ❤ Metal (1999, Triple Crown Records)
- Pedal Faster Bicycle Rider (1999, Accident Prone Records)
- Che Fest 1999 (1999, Slowdance Records)
- The Actuality of Thought (1999, Bifocal Media)
- Kiss The Cook - Rock 105.3's Latitude 32° (1999)
- Slightest Indication of Change (2000, Slowdance Records)
- Y2K-Proof! (2000, Big Wheel Recreation)
- Introduce You To Your New Favorite Bands: Summer Sampler (2000, Doghouse Records/Big Wheel Recreation)
- Welcome To Triple Crown Records (2001, Triple Crown Records)
- Undecided Records Sampler (2002, Undecided Records)
- This River Runs Dry (2002, Music Is My Heroin)
- The Best of Emo Diaries, Vol. 1 (2009, WWW Records)
- Ken Shipley's Pro Skater 2 (2026, The Numero Group)
- Extent Silver Five Inch Collection (Extent Fanzine)
