= Sounds Like Violence =

Swedish musical group

- Origin: Ängelholm, Sweden
- Genres: Indie rock Emo
- Labels: Deep Elm Records (USA); Burning Heart Records (Rest of World)
- Members: Andreas Söderlund; Daniel Teodorsson; Daniel Petersson; Philip Hall
- Website: soundslikeviolence.com

Sounds Like Violence are a four-piece emo/indie rock group from Ängelholm, Sweden. They are currently signed to Deep Elm Records (within the United States) and Burning Heart Records (in the rest of the world). Their debut album, With Blood On My Hands, was released on 12th Feb, 2007 to some critical acclaim. They previously released an EP, titled The Pistol, in 2004 and contributed songs to Deep Elm compilations including "Emo Diaries No. 10" and a "Split" EP.

== History ==
Sounds Like Violence decided to stay in their hometown Ängelholm. The indie rock group formed by Vocalist/guitarist Andreas Söderlund in 2001. Later joined by bassist/vocalist Daniel Teodorsson, drummer Daniel Petersson, and guitarist Philip Hall, most of whom also played in known band Niccokick. They released the EP "The Pistol" in the U.S. under Deep Elm in April 2004, which was critically well received. A three-way split with Settlefish and Desert City Soundtrack was released that summer. Their debut full-length, "With Blood on My Hands", was released in February 2007 through both Deep Elm in North America and Burning Heart Records in Europe and Japan.

== Discography ==
- 2004: The Pistol
- 2007: With Blood On My Hands
- 2009: The Devil On Nobel Street

== Compilation appearances ==
- Desert City Soundtrack / Settlefish / Sounds Like Violence (Split Series) (Deep Elm)
- Deep Elm (Various) - Cover Your Tracks (Deep Elm)
- Unreleased No. 3: Deep Elm (Various) (Deep Elm)
- Emo Diaries No. 10: The Hope I Hide Inside (Deep Elm)

== Band members ==
Current members

- Andreas Söderlund – lead vocals, guitar
- Daniel Teodorsson – bass, backing vocals
- Daniel Petersson – drums
- Philip Hall – guitar
