= I Guess This Is Goodbye (album) =

Compilation album by Deep Elm Records
- Released: October 24, 2000
- Genre: Emo, indie rock
- Length: 54:17
- Label: Deep Elm (DER-390)

The Emo Diaries chronology
An Ocean of Doubt (1999)	I Guess This Is Goodbye (2000)	The Silence in My Heart (2001)

Professional ratings
Review scores
Source	Rating
Allmusic	3/5 stars

I Guess This Is Goodbye is the fifth installment in The Emo Diaries series of compilation albums, released October 24, 2000 by Deep Elm Records. As with all installments in the series, the label had an open submissions policy for bands to submit material for the compilation; as a result, the music does not all fit within the emo style. As with the rest of the series, I Guess This Is Goodbye features mostly unsigned bands contributing songs that were previously unreleased.

Reviewer Johnny Loftus of Allmusic remarks that "Sonically, this volume of the series doesn't tread too far from the emo feedbag. The set vacillates between a rawer, post-hardcore sound (Cast Aside) and the drifting and/or driving traditional emo of groups like [Kerith] Ravine and Benji. This is not the strongest chapter of the Emo Diaries, but it will certainly offer enough thrills and chills for Deep Elm faithful."

== Track listing ==
No.	Title	Artist	Length
1.	"Looking Past Sky"	The White Octave	4:11
2.	"Daydreams of a Future"	Slowride	2:51
3.	"You Do It Awfully"	Reubens Accomplice	4:04
4.	"6:00AM in Cortona"	The Walt Lariat	5:48
5.	"Frostbite"	Sunfactor	5:30
6.	"I'll Never Get Home"	Eniac	3:52
7.	"Interlude / All at Once"	Benji	4:47
8.	"Two Empty Bottles"	Kerith Ravine	2:57
9.	"Racecar Theory"	Cast Aside	6:43
10.	"Accentuate"	Billy	4:16
11.	"For Good"	The Others	5:30
12.	"Landmine"	The End of Julia	3:41
Total length:			54:17
