= Logh (band) =

Swedish Post-Rock Band

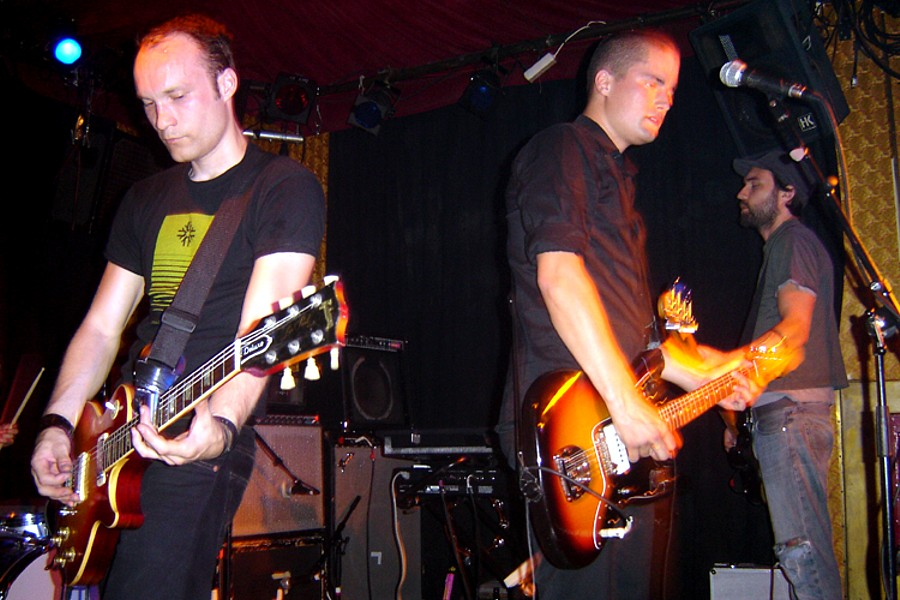

Background information
- Origin: Lund, Sweden
- Genres: Art rock, post-rock
- Years active: 1998–present
- Members: Mattias Friberg (vocals, guitar); Mathias Olden (bass); Jens Hellgren (guitar); Mattias Jeppsson (guitar); Karl Arvidson (keyboards); Markku Hildén (drums)
- Past members: Kristofer Ronstrom (drums); Fredrik Normark (drums)
- Website: http://logh.se

Logh (pronounced log) is a post-rock band formed in 1998 in Lund, Sweden. With four members, their first LP was released in 2002 on Bad Taste Records, incorporating elements of indie rock and shoegaze with hushed vocals and introspective lyrics. Played at Sleazys. The album was followed by two more, with lo-fi shoegazer elements, lightly brushed snares, subtle guitar strumming, and droning bass lines.

After their second album, Kristofer Ronstrom (drums) was dropped from the band lineup, eventually replaced by not one but three new members, Markku Hildén (drums), Mattias Jeppsson (guitar), and Karl Arvidson (keyboards).

== Discography ==
- Every Time a Bell Rings an Angel Gets His Wings (2002)
- The Raging Sun (2003)
- The Contractor and the Assassin EP (2003)
- A Sunset Panorama (2005)
- North (2007) (peaked at no 45 in Sweden)

Compilations

- The Emo Diaries Ch. 8: My Very Last Breath (2002)

Singles (7" Vinyl)

- Ghosts (2002)
- An Alliance of Hearts (2003)
- The Bones of Generations (2004)
- Lights From Sovereign States (2007)
- The Raging Sun (2007)

== Trivia ==
- Every Time a Bell Rings an Angel Gets His Wings was originally released under the name Log. The name was changed after the release and the album was re-released under the name Logh.
