= A Million Miles Away (album) =

Compilation album by Deep Elm Records
- Released: April 14, 1998
- Genres: Emo, indie rock
- Length: 62:30
- Label: Deep Elm (DER-367)

The Emo Diaries chronology
What's Mine Is Yours (1997)	A Million Miles Away (1998)	The Moment of Truth (1999)

A Million Miles Away is the second installment in The Emo Diaries series of compilation albums, released April 14, 1998, by Deep Elm Records. As with all installments in the series, the label had an open submissions policy for bands to submit material for the compilation; as a result, the music does not all fit within the emo style. As with the rest of the series, A Million Miles Away features mostly unsigned bands contributing songs that were previously unreleased.

== Track listing ==
No.	Title	Artist	Length
1.	"Writing It Down for You"	Pop Unknown	4:27
2.	"Max"	The Appleseed Cast	4:15
3.	"Incomplete"	Seven Storey Mountain	4:43
4.	"Cold Night in Virginia"	The Blacktop Cadence	5:21
5.	"Holly Park"	Brandtson	5:31
6.	"The Wrath"	Shooters & Senders	4:02
7.	"After Dark"	Buford	2:43
8.	"S.E.G."	The Jazz June	4:08
9.	"Life Without Ambition"	Plain	3:18
10.	"Somedays"	Magstatic	3:49
11.	"Kayla Learns to Dance"	My Favorite Citizen	3:26
12.	"Nova"	Strike Force	4:22
13.	"Teenage Unity Song" "Delicate Skin" (hidden track)	The Miracle of 86; Tess Wiley	12:25
Total length:			62:30
