= One Day Savior Recordings =

American independent record label

- Founded: 1997
- Founder: Christopher Tzompanakis
- Defunct: 2014
- Status: Inactive
- Distributor: Lumberjack Mordam Music Group
- Genre: hardcore; metalcore; post-hardcore; emo; indie rock
- Country of origin: United States
- Location: Williston Park, Long Island, New York
- Official website: www.onedaysavior.com Archived 29 January 2010 at the Wayback Machine

One Day Savior Recordings was an American independent record label founded in 1997 by Christopher Tzompanakis. The record label was most prominent in the hardcore and indie rock communities, releasing metalcore, post-hardcore and emo by such bands as Boys Night Out, Dearly Departed, Embodyment, Hopesfall, The Juliana Theory, The Killing Tree, The Movielife, Onelinedrawing, Paulson, Skycamefalling, The Sleeping and Tabula Rasa. One Day Savior Recordings was originally headquartered in Williston Park, Long Island, New York, where it remained until it was put under hiatus in 2008. The company was eventually sold to Tommy Melissen in 2010, its operations relocating to Philadelphia, Pennsylvania. Under Melissen's ownership, the company lasted a brief two years and was officially put to rest in 2014 after two years of inactivity.

One Day Savior Recordings was distributed by Lumberjack Mordam Music Group, and at times co-released albums with Ferret Music, Eulogy Recordings, Trustkill Records, Defiance Records, Solid State Records, Initial Records, Doghouse Records, Black Box Music, Cavity Records, Immigrant Sun Records, Forge Again Records, Scorched Earth Policy, and Scene Police Records.

== Background ==
One Day Savior Recordings (also known as One Day Savior Record Company or One Day Savior Records, and stylized as OneDaySavior) was founded by Skycamefalling vocalist Christopher Tzompanakis in 1997. Tzompanakis was shopping around for a new record label for his band when, after hearing negative feedback from his friends' bands about local record labels, decided to start up his own. However, Tzompanakis made it a point not to affiliate his record label with his band and treated them as separate businesses.

=== Acquisition ===
On July 31, 2010, after 26 months of inactivity, One Day Savior Recordings' website announced that it was under the new ownership of Tommy Melissen and had relocated to Philadelphia, Pennsylvania. Some of the bands signed to One Day Savior Recordings by Melissen include Animalhaüs, American Hell, Holly Would..., Me Against Myself, The Jett Black Hearts Attacks and XPunisHerX.

== One Day Savior Fest ==
Tzompanakis organized a one-day festival named One Day Savior Fest which took place on October 19, 2002 at the Bricklayers and Allied Craftworkers Union Local 7 in Farmingdale, New York. The artists that performed included The Killing Tree, Boys Night Out, Tabula Rasa, Dearly Departed, Blood Red, Regarding I, In Dying Days, Kid Brother Collective and The Chase Theory.

== Artists ==
This is an archival list of artists who have recorded for One Day Savior Recordings.

- Animalhaüs
- American Hell
- Bird of Ill Omen
- Blue Skies Burning
- Boys Night Out
- Break of Dawn
- Celebrity
- The Chase Theory
- Confine
- Day After
- Dearly Departed
- Embodyment
- Ex Number Five
- Forstella Ford
- The Grey A.M.
- Holly Would...
- Hopesfall
- Ignorance Never Settles
- In Dying Days
- Incision
- The Jett Blackk Heart Attacks
- Jude The Obscure
- The Juliana Theory
- Kid Brother Collective
- The Killing Tree
- Knives & Green Water
- Mara'akate
- Me Against Myself
- The Movielife
- Onelinedrawing
- Paulson
- XPunisHerX
- Regarding I
- Remembering Never
- Rosesdead
- Serapis
- Skycamefalling
- The Sleeping
- Suicide Note
- Superstitions of the Sky
- Tabula Rasa
- Take My Chances
- Undying

== See also ==
- List of record labels
