= Dear Avalanche =

Studio album by Lights & Motion
- Released: 20 January 2017
- Studio: Gothenburg
- Genre: Ambient, dream pop, post-rock, shoegaze, indie rock
- Length: 49:00
- Label: Deep Elm
- Producer: Christoffer Franzén

Lights & Motion chronology
Chronicle (2015)	Dear Avalanche (2017)	Bloom (2018)

Dear Avalanche is the fourth studio album by Swedish cinematic post-rock band Lights & Motion. It was released worldwide on January 20, 2017, through the American independent record label Deep Elm Records. The album was produced and mixed by Christoffer Franzén and recorded in Gothenburg between 2015 and 2016. It was mastered by Dave Cooley (M83) at Elysian Masters, Los Angeles.

== Style ==
According to an AMA that Christoffer Franzén from the Lights & Motion hosted on Reddit, the album will contain a lot of different kinds of textures and soundscapes; "I would take beautiful strings and then wrangle them through reverbs/delays and saturation to get it to sound like something else entirely." The album also features previously unused elements like vintage synthesiser sounds and electronics.

== Track listing ==
All tracks are written by Christoffer Franzén

No.	Title	Length
1.	"This Explosion Within"	2:17
2.	"Feathers"	4:43
3.	"Silver Lining"	4:00
4.	"Anomaly"	2:54
5.	"Pandora"	4:20
6.	"Perfect Symmetry"	3:18
7.	"Everest"	3:03
8.	"Lucid Dreaming"	4:20
9.	"DNA"	4:19
10.	"Anamorphic"	3:51
11.	"Exhale"	2:44
12.	"As They Sleep"	2:00
13.	"All The Way"	3:46
14.	"We Only Have Forever"	3:03

== Personnel ==
- Christoffer Franzén – vocals, electric guitar, acoustic guitar, bass guitar, drums, percussion, keyboards, programming, piano, synthesizer, glockenspiel, orchestration, sound design, string arrangements
- Rosan Harmens – artwork
