= U137 (band) =

Swedish post-rock duo

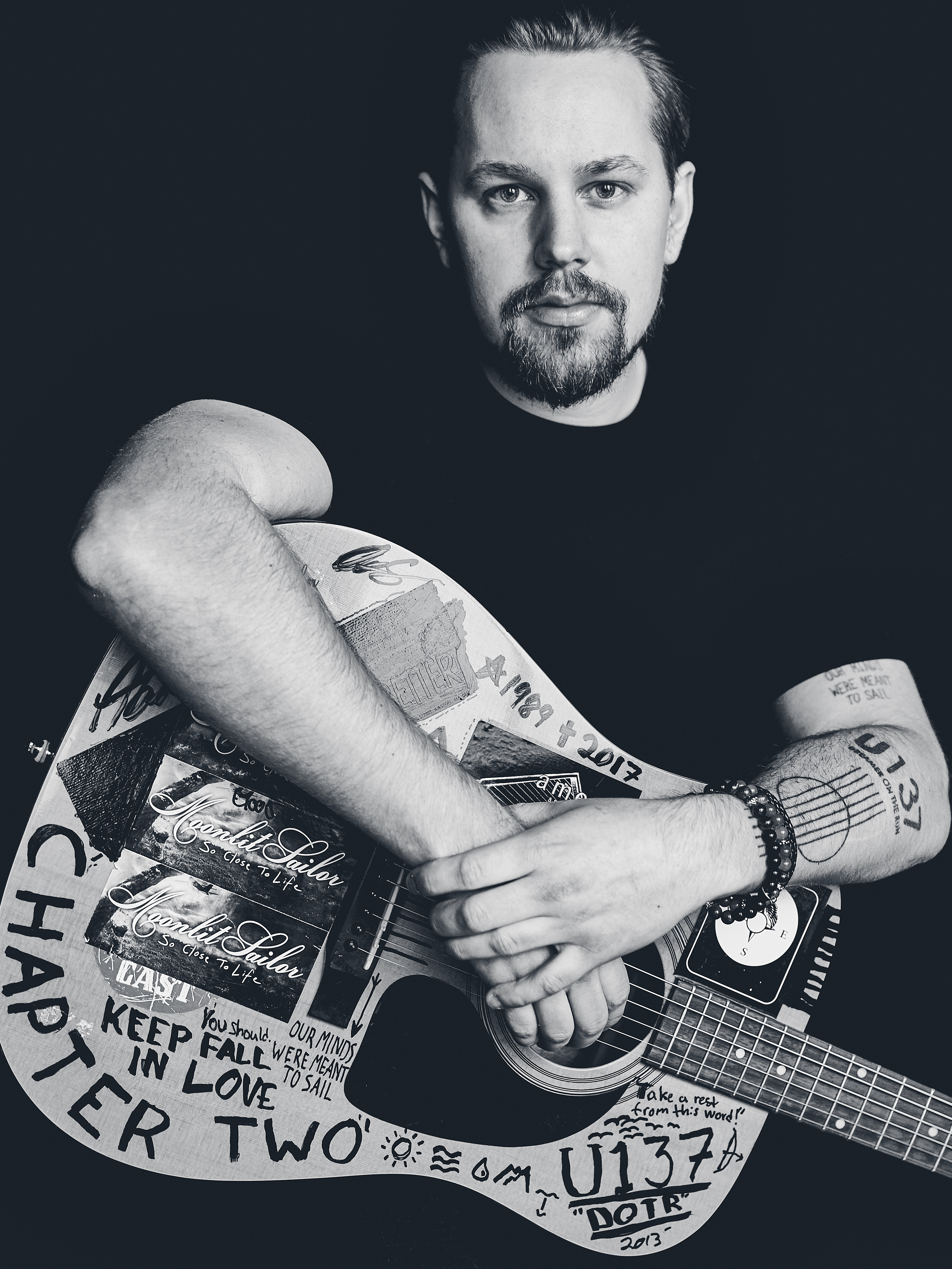

Background information
- Origin: Borås, Sweden
- Years active: 2013–present
- Labels: Deep Elm Records
- Spinoff of: Moonlit Sailor
- Members: Adam Törnblad; Oscar Gullbrandsen

U137 is a cinematic post-rock duo from Borås, Sweden, consisting of musicians Adam Törnblad and Oscar Gullbrandsen. Both artists were part of another post-rock band called Moonlit Sailor, signed to indie label Deep Elm Records. As U137, the Swedish duo styled their sound to be more cinematic in nature, following from earlier traditional rock-influenced work. Their debut album Dreamer On The Run was released by Deep Elm Records in 2013.
On May 8, 2017, Törnblad died at the age of 27.

== Dreamer On The Run (2013) ==
U137's debut album was produced, recorded, mixed and mastered at the HAV Music Studio in Boras.

The album was released on August 20, 2013. The album has received generally positive reviews.

== Band members ==
Current members

- Oscar Gullbrandsen (guitar, bass, piano, strings, vocals)

== Discography ==
=== Albums ===
- 2013: Dreamer on the Run
- 2019: Chapter Two
- 2022: Imagination

=== Singles ===
- 2017: "Adam Forever" b/w "The Great Leap" (from Chapter Two)
- 2020: "Have Hope" (from Imagination) b/w "Beyond the Horizon"
- 2024: "Bloom & Wither"

=== Compilation appearances ===
Deep Elm Records

- 2014: Sampler No. 12: Sometimes I See You in the Stars – "Watching the Storm" (from Dreamer on the Run)
- 2016: Sampler No. 13: This Heart of Mine – "Pearl Lakes" (from Dreamer on the Run)
- 2020: Sampler No. 14: Farewells – "What We Call Home" & "Adam Forever" (from Chapter Two)
