= Brandtson =

American rock band

- Origin: Cleveland, Ohio
- Genres: Emo, indie rock
- Years active: 1996–2008
- Labels: Deep Elm, The Militia Group

Brandtson was an American rock band from Cleveland, Ohio.

== History ==
The band formed in 1996 and first recorded for a Stead Fast Records compilation entitled Radiowaves and Gibberish in 1997. Soon after the group signed with Deep Elm Records, appearing on their Emo Diaries series before issuing their debut LP, Letterbox, late in 1998. The group quickly issued two more releases, Fallen Star Collection and the EP Trying to Figure Each Other Out, in successive years. Dial in Sounds followed in 2002, and the following year the group released a split EP with Camber and Seven Storey Mountain.

In 2004, the group signed with The Militia Group and began working with producer Ed Rose for their fifth full-length, Send Us a Signal, which arrived in 2004. In the same year, a previously unreleased song, "Little Birds and Sparrows", was put onto the compilation album "Take Action! Vol 4". Another full-length, Hello Control, was issued in 2006.

The members of Brandtson, minus Jared Jolley, reformed to the small garage rock project Swarm of Bats. In 2007 Adam Boose opened the audio mastering studio Cauliflower Audio to a positive reception. Boose and Myk Porter went on to create the duo Golden Streets of Paradise. Vocalist Myk Porter and Guitarist Matt Traxler were originally in the band Six Feet Deep.

== Members ==
- Myk Porter - vocals, guitar
- Matt Traxler - guitar
- John Sayre - bass (1996–2005)
- Adam Boose - bass (2005–2008)
- Jared Jolley - vocals, drums

== Discography ==
- Letterbox (Deep Elm Records, 1998)
- Let's Call It A Day. 7 (Velvet Blue Music, 1998)
- The Fallen Star Collection (Deep Elm, 1999)
- Trying to Figure Each Other Out EP (Deep Elm, 2000)
- Dial In Sounds (Deep Elm, 2002)
- Death and Taxes EP (Deep Elm, 2003)
- Brandtson–Camber–Seven Storey split with Camber and Seven Storey Mountain (Deep Elm, 2003)
- Send Us a Signal (The Militia Group, 2004)
- Hello Control (The Militia Group, 2006)
