= Division by zero (disambiguation) =

Division by zero is a term used in mathematics if the divisor (denominator) is zero.

Division by Zero, Dividing by Zero or Divide by Zero may also refer to:

- Division by Zero (album), by Hux Flux, 2003
- Dividing by Zero, a 2002 album by Seven Storey Mountain
- "Dividing by Zero", a song by the Offspring from the 2012 album Days Go By
- Divide by Zero (album), by Killing Floor, 1997
- Division by Zero (short story), by Ted Chiang, 1991

== See also ==
- Zero Divide, video game
- American wire gauge, including 1/0, 2/0 etc
- "Two Divided by Zero", a song on the 1986 Pet Shop Boys album Please
- Yeorinhieut (ㆆ), in the Korean alphabet Hangul, which resembles division by zero
