= Chronicle (Lights & Motion album) =

Studio album by Lights & Motion
- Released: 13 January 2015
- Recorded: Gothenburg
- Genre: Ambient, dream pop, post-rock, shoegaze, indie rock
- Length: 36 minutes
- Label: Deep Elm
- Producer: Christoffer Franzén

Lights & Motion chronology
Save Your Heart (2013)	Chronicle (2015)	Dear Avalanche (2017)

Chronicle is the third studio album by Swedish cinematic post-rock band Lights & Motion.

== Description ==
Chronicle was released worldwide on 13 January 2015, through the American independent record label Deep Elm Records, which also released the band's two previous albums. The album was produced and mixed by Christoffer Franzén and recorded in Gothenburg during 2014. It was mastered by Dave Cooley (M83) at Elysian Masters, LA.

The album contains nine tracks and has a total running time of 37 minutes.

== Reception ==
British magazine Rock Sound gave the album an 8/10 rating, calling it "Awe-Inspiring".

== Style ==
Chronicle features a very detailed and big production behind its core frame of pianos, drums, synths and electric guitars. The combination of a solid foreground and a broad ambient background gives it a widescreen/panoramic "big canvas" feel.

== Artwork ==
The artwork for Chronicle was made by Will Sutton.

== Trivia ==
- Songs "Fireflies" and "Glow" were featured in The Vampire Diaries.

== Track listing ==
All songs composed by Christoffer Franzén.

No.	Title	Length
1.	"Fireflies"	5:26
2.	"Glow"	4:16
3.	"Antlers"	5:08
4.	"Reborn"	4:07
5.	"Northern Lights"	2:02
6.	"Particle Storm"	4:36
7.	"As the World Goes Away"	4:35
8.	"Paper Wings"	2:15
9.	"The Spectacular Quiet"	3:51

== Personnel ==
=== Lights and Motion ===
- Christoffer Franzén – Vocals, electric guitar, acoustic guitar, bass guitar, drums, percussion, keyboards, programming, piano, synthesizer, glockenspiel, orchestration, sound design, string arrangements
