= Save Your Heart (Lights & Motion album) =

Studio album by Lights & Motion
- Released: 12 November 2013
- Recorded: Gothenburg
- Genre: Electronic, ambient, dream pop, post-rock, shoegaze, indie rock
- Length: 40 minutes
- Label: Deep Elm
- Producer: Christoffer Franzén

Lights & Motion chronology
Reanimation (2013)	Save Your Heart (2013)	Chronicle (2015)

Save Your Heart is the second studio album by Swedish cinematic post-rock band Lights & Motion. It was released worldwide on November 12, 2013, through the American independent record label Deep Elm Records. The album was produced by Christoffer Franzén and recorded in Gothenburg during 2012 and 2013. The album contains eleven tracks and has a total running time of 40 minutes. It is the follow-up to the band's debut album Reanimation, and it is Deep Elms 200th release in their catalog.

== Background and recording ==
Prior to recording Save Your Heart in 2013, the band had just put out their debut album Reanimation. It was announced only months later that a new record was going to be released in November, the same year. This album was recorded in the same Gothenburg studio as the band's first album, and Franzén once again took on all of the duties surrounding the recording process by himself, acting as both engineer, producer, technician and mixer. It was recorded throughout 2013 and wrapped just before it was scheduled to be released. Franzén recorded the album as a way to both remember and remind himself of why he does what he do in life; "...This is me doing the thing I love and this is me sharing the things that I am most afraid of. Save Your Heart is conceptually about not giving up on the things that make you lose track of time, that make you feel something and the things that make you realize that maybe there is something that you are born to do. Music is that way for me, and it has always been. At the same time It´s hard not to give up on your dreams, because dreaming takes courage and a lot of sacrifice."

== Style ==
Save Your Heart sees the band changing their main writing instrument from the guitar to piano. Where its predecessor Reanimation was heavily dominated by repeating guitar arpeggios and strong melodic hooks performed on guitar, they now get to take somewhat of a backseat, and in doing so enables other instruments to step forward and fill the void on this new record. The piano is heavily featured on half of the tracks, and this album also sees an increased use of synthesizers, especially in tracks such as "Heartbeats" and "Orbit". The songs on Save Your Heart are also noticeably shorter than on the band's debut, oftentimes reaching a final playtime of 2–3 minutes. Franzén have at times described himself as a "Painter of sound", and in doing so expanding with; "On Save Your Heart, I wanted to push the sound of Lights & Motion further out, reaching upwards towards the stratosphere, higher up in the ether of space while daring to be bolder in both statement and style. I wanted Save Your Heart to have more of a blueish or violet color in terms of sonic identity. In comparison, Reanimation had more of a yellowish tone."

== Artwork ==
The artwork for Save Your Heart was designed by graphic designer Elias Klingén. The image, which is visualized through a combination of colours and abstract lines, is a graphical representation of a heart, being connected by two different colors of red and blue, conceptualizing the album.

== Trivia ==
- The movie Transcendence starring Johnny Depp and Morgan Freeman, features album track "We Are Ghosts" in its theatrical trailers and featurettes.
- "Heartbeats" was used in the second trailer for the motion picture Concussion (Concussion (2015 film)), starring Will Smith.
- "We Are Ghosts" was featured in Apple's Academy Awards (2015) spot.

== Track listing ==
All songs composed by Christoffer Franzén.

No.	Title	Length
1.	"Heartbeats"	5:45
2.	"Ultraviolet"	2:23
3.	"Sparks"	4:13
4.	"Shimmer"	4:05
5.	"Snow"	6:40
6.	"Bright Eyes"	3:50
7.	"Crystalline"	3:59
8.	"Orbit"	1:48
9.	"We Are Ghosts"	2:22
10.	"Atlas"	3:02
11.	"Save Your Heart"	2:22
Total length:		40:00

== Personnel ==
=== Lights And Motion ===
- Christoffer Franzén – guitar, keyboards, vocals, drums, bass guitar, synthesizers, string arrangements, programming, production, mixing, engineering, piano, sound design
