= Bloom (Lights & Motion album) =

Studio album by Lights & Motion
- Released: 2 February 2018
- Studio: Gothenburg
- Genre: Ambient, dream pop, post-rock, shoegaze, indie rock
- Length: 18:06
- Label: Deep Elm
- Producer: Christoffer Franzén

Lights & Motion chronology
Dear Avalanche (2015)	Bloom (2018)

Bloom is a studio mini-album by Swedish cinematic post-rock band Lights & Motion. It was released worldwide on February 2, 2018, through the American independent record label Deep Elm Records. The album was produced and mixed by Christoffer Franzén and recorded in Gothenburg between 2016 and 2018. It was mastered by Dave Cooley (M83, Paramore) at Elysian Masters, Los Angeles.

== Track listing ==
All tracks are written by Christoffer Franzén

No.	Title	Length
1.	"Overture"	3:17
2.	"Vanilla Sky"	3:06
3.	"Bloom"	5:35
4.	"Glaciers"	2:56
5.	"Lion"	3:11

== Personnel ==
- Christoffer Franzén – vocals, electric guitar, acoustic guitar, bass guitar, drums, percussion, keyboards, programming, piano, synthesizer, glockenspiel, orchestration, sound design, string arrangements
- Shane Labelle – artwork
