= Colossus (Walt Mink album) =

Studio album by Walt Mink
- Released: June 17, 1997
- Recorded: October 1996
- Studio: Smart, Madison, Wisconsin
- Genre: Alternative rock, math rock, psychedelic rock
- Length: 41:34
- Label: Deep Elm
- Producer: Doug "Mr Colson" Olson

Walt Mink chronology
| El Producto (1996) | Colossus (1997) | Goodnite (1998) |

Colossus is the fourth and final studio album by the American alternative rock band Walt Mink, released in 1997.

== Critical reception ==
Professional ratings
Review scores
| Source | Rating |
|---|---|
| AllMusic | 3/5 stars |
| Pitchfork | 9.3/10 |

The Wisconsin State Journal stated: "The diversity of Colossus shows Walt Mink toning down some of its bombast and cutting loose more than ever: From the odd tunings of the almost-too-precious 'She Can Smile' to the hand-claps of the sparkling acoustic ballad 'Act of Quiet Desperation', Walt Mink seems more assured than ever doing what it does best."

AllMusic wrote: "Energetic and fiery on just about every track with few indications of studio trickery or even a mid-tempo ballad, Colossus just keeps on chugging from start to stop."

== Track listing ==
All tracks by John Kimbrough

1. "Goodnite" - 3:43
2. "John's Dream" - 5:05
3. "She Can Smile" - 2:56
4. "Brave Beyond the Call" - 4:05
5. "Lost in the World" - 5:14
6. "Lovely Arrhythmia" - 3:33
7. "Boots" - 4:08
8. "Lama" - 2:59
9. "Act of Quiet Desperation" - 3:18
10. "Freetime" - 6:26

== Personnel ==
- John Kimbrough – guitar, vocals, cover photo
- Candice Belanoff – bass guitar, backing vocals
- Orestes Morfin – drums, percussion, backing vocals
- Doug "Mr Colson" Olson – production, engineering, mix, photos
- Andy Olson – assistant engineer
- Roger Lian – mastering
