= Reanimation (Lights & Motion album) =

Studio album by Lights & Motion
- Released: 16 January 2013
- Recorded: Gothenburg
- Genre: Post-rock; shoegaze; dream pop
- Length: 1:07:00
- Label: Deep Elm
- Producer: Christoffer Franzén

Lights & Motion chronology
Reanimation (2013)	Save Your Heart (2013)

Reanimation is the debut studio album by Swedish post-rock musical project Lights & Motion, led by musician and native born Christoffer Franzén. It was released worldwide on January 16, 2013, through the American independent record label Deep Elm Records. The album was produced by Christoffer Franzén and recorded in Gothenburg during 2011 and 2012. The album contains thirteen tracks and has a total running time of 67 minutes.

== Background and recording ==
Prior to recording Reanimation in 2011 and 2012, Franzén suffered from insomnia. This led to him spending time alone in a small studio in Gothenburg, experimenting with different ways of writing and recording music. Being self-taught in every aspect of his musicianship, he went through a long period of trial and error, trying to get a grasp on how to get what he heard in his head to come out of the speakers. After releasing a few demos online around 2011 and 2012, a buzz started to grow in the alternative and postrock scene, eventually garnering the attention of American independent record label Deep Elm Records, who later signed the band in 2012. The band started to work towards releasing their debut album in 2012, which came to be called Reanimation. Because of budget constraints, the album would be completely produced, engineered and mix by Franzén himself, stating that; "There is just this urge, this need to create and it takes on different shapes. I never know what I will end up with, and it's often very different from what I started out with. Sometimes I tell people that this album consists of my dreams...only I wasn't sleeping with they came to me, I just did my best to get them down on tape."

== Style ==
Reanimation is known for its guitar driven sound, often reaching and building towards euphoric crescendoes. The album also made a mark for itself by introducing a very cinematic sound into the postrock genre, introducing string arrangements and glockenspiel to an already busy mix of drums, reverberated electric guitars and ambient sounds. Other bands that influenced the sound of this album were Coldplay, M83, Sigur Rós and Explosions in the Sky, as well as film music, particularly from Hans Zimmer. The album is pretty much instrumental all the way through, except for some quietly whispered words tucked in low in the mix on tracks like "The March" and "Reanimation", the exception being the final track, "Dream Away", which features full-on vocals with lyrics.

== Track listing ==
All songs composed by Christoffer Franzén.

No.	Title	Length
1.	"Requiem"	2:12
2.	"Home"	3:43
3.	"Aerials"	5:45
4.	"Drift"	4:50
5.	"The March"	6:45
6.	"Victory Rose"	5:03
7.	"Epilogue"	3:57
8.	"Fractured"	4:55
9.	"Texas"	9:21
10.	"Faded Fluorescence"	7:56
11.	"Departure"	2:22
12.	"Reanimation"	4:20
13.	"Dream Away"	5:40
Total length:		67:00

== Personnel ==
=== Lights & Motion ===
- Christoffer Franzén – guitar, keyboards, vocals, drums, bass guitar, synthesizers, string arrangements, programming, production, mixing, engineering, piano, sound design
