= Goodnite (album) =

Live album by Walt Mink
- Released: September 1, 1998
- Recorded: November 1, 1997
- Genre: Alternative rock, math rock, psychedelic rock
- Length: 74:38
- Label: Deep Elm Records
- Producer: Walt Mink

Walt Mink chronology
Colossus (1997)	Goodnite (1998)

Professional ratings
Review scores
Source	Rating
AllMusic	2.5/5 stars

Goodnite is a 1998 live album by the American alternative rock band Walt Mink. It is a recording of their farewell show, at the Mercury Lounge in New York City, on November 1, 1997. It is their only release to feature their third drummer, Zach Danziger. His predecessor, Orestes Morfin, guests on one track, "Shine". The opening track, "Fourth Wave", does not appear on any of the band's studio albums. The final song of the show, "A Tree in Orange", was not included on the album.

== Track listing ==
All songs written by John Kimbrough.

1. "Fourth Wave" - 4:37
2. "Stood Up" - 2:58
3. "Everything Worthwhile" - 2:46
4. "Goodnite" - 3:59
5. "Frail" - 3:34
6. "Betty" - 3:15
7. "Miss Happiness" - 3:27
8. "Showers Down/Twinkle and Shine" - 6:23
9. "Lost in the World" - 5:03
10. "Brave Beyond the Call" - 4:03
11. "Overgrown" - 4:55
12. "Subway" - 2:18
13. "She Can Smile" - 2:45
14. "Shine" - 4:16
15. "Love in the Dakota" - 4:05
16. "Factory" - 12:43
17. "Settled" - 3:24

== Personnel ==
- John Kimbrough - guitar, vocals
- Candice Belanoff - bass guitar, backing vocals
- Zach Danziger - drums, percussion

- Orestes Morfin - drums on "Shine"
- Ken Weinstein - introduction
- John Agnello - engineer, mix
- Wayne Dorell - mix
- Kurt Wolff - engineer
- Greg Calbi - mastering
- John Szuch - design, photography
- Justin Borucki - photography
- Charlie Gross - photography
- John & Candice - collage
