= List of albums awarded 10 by Pitchfork =

The American online music publication Pitchfork assigns scores using a decimal scale of 0.0 to 10.0. It has awarded a perfect score to more than 150 albums, most in retrospective reviews of classic albums or reissues. According to Rob Harvilla of The Ringer, a perfect Pitchfork score given to an album on release "qualifies as a seismic event for the rock-critic universe as a whole". Artists whose albums have received perfect scores on release include Radiohead, Fiona Apple, Kanye West, Bonnie "Prince" Billy, And You Will Know Us by the Trail of Dead and Wilco.

Compilation albums that received a perfect score on release, such as The Smile Sessions, are listed in both the "Awarded on release" and "Reissue" columns.

Date awarded	Title	Artist	Year	Review author	Awarded on release	Reissue	Sunday Review	Notes	Reference
16 January 1996	El Producto	Walt Mink	1996	Ryan Schreiber	Yes			—	
1 May 1996	Gay?	12 Rods	1996	Jason Josephes	Yes			—	
April 1997	Kind of Blue	Miles Davis	1959	Ryan Schreiber		Yes		Published undated	
May 1997	Raw Power	Iggy & the Stooges	1973	Jason Josephes		Yes		Published undated	
May 1997	OK Computer	Radiohead	1997	Ryan Schreiber	Yes			Published undated	
July 1997	Bricolage	Amon Tobin	1997	Ryan Schreiber	Yes			Published undated	
July 1997	Alive!	Kiss	1975	Jason Jospehes		Yes		Published undated	
1 September 1997	This Nation's Saving Grace	The Fall	1985	Bruce Tiffee		Yes		—	
October 1997	Sketches of Spain	Miles Davis	1960	Ryan Schreiber		Yes		Published undated	
March 1998	Odds & Sods	The Who	1974	Jason Josephes		Yes		Published undated	
October 1998	The Bootleg Series Vol. 4: Bob Dylan Live 1966, The "Royal Albert Hall" Concert	Bob Dylan	1998	Neil Lieberman	Yes	Yes		Published undated	
1 July 1999	The Soft Bulletin	The Flaming Lips	1999	Jason Josephes	Yes			—	
30 September 1999	I See a Darkness	Bonnie "Prince" Billy	1999	Samir Khan	Yes			—	
25 April 2000	Animals	Pink Floyd	1977	James P. Wisdom		Yes		—	
2 October 2000	Kid A	Radiohead	2000	Brent DiCrescenzo	Yes			—	
15 October 2001	The Olatunji Concert: The Last Live Recording	John Coltrane	2001	Brent DiCrescenzo	Yes	Yes		—	
28 February 2002	Source Tags & Codes	...And You Will Know Us by the Trail of Dead	2002	Matt LeMay	Yes			—	
21 April 2002	Yankee Hotel Foxtrot	Wilco	2002	Brent S. Sirota	Yes			—	
9 May 2002	This Year's Model	Elvis Costello & The Attractions	1978	Matt LeMay		Yes		—	
9 July 2002	English Settlement	XTC	1982	Chris Dahlen		Yes		—	
30 April 2003	The Essential Clash	The Clash	2003	Chris Ott	Yes	Yes		—	
19 June 2003	The Ascension	Glenn Branca	1981	Andy Beta		Yes		—	
9 December 2003	Marquee Moon	Television	1977	Chris Dahlen		Yes		—	
10 February 2004	No Thanks! The '70s Punk Rebellion	Various artists	2004	Eric Carr	Yes	Yes		—	
30 March 2004	'Live' at the Apollo	James Brown	1963	Dominique Leone		Yes		—	
26 April 2004	Music Has the Right to Children	Boards of Canada	1998	Mark Richardson		Yes		—	
21 September 2004	London Calling	The Clash	1979	Amanda Petrusich		Yes		—	
25 October 2004	Crooked Rain, Crooked Rain	Pavement	1994	Mark Richardson		Yes		Review of the expanded reissue Crooked Rain, Crooked Rain: LA's Desert Origins	
9 June 2005	Endtroducing.....	DJ Shadow	1996	Chris Dahlen		Yes		—	
26 September 2005	In the Aeroplane Over the Sea	Neutral Milk Hotel	1998	Mark Richardson		Yes		—	
18 November 2005	Born to Run	Bruce Springsteen	1975	Mark Richardson		Yes		—	
5 May 2006	Pink Flag	Wire	1977	Joe Tangari		Yes		—	
5 May 2006	Chairs Missing	Wire	1978	Joe Tangari		Yes		—	
13 June 2007	Daydream Nation	Sonic Youth	1988	Nitsuh Abebe		Yes		—	
29 October 2007	Unknown Pleasures	Joy Division	1979	Joshua Klein		Yes		—	
29 October 2007	Closer	Joy Division	1980	Joshua Klein		Yes		—	
21 April 2008	Let It Be	The Replacements	1984	Mark Richardson		Yes		—	
9 May 2008	Otis Blue/Otis Redding Sings Soul	Otis Redding	1965	Nate Ptrin		Yes		—	
24 November 2008	Murmur	R.E.M.	1983	Stephen M. Deusner		Yes		—	
13 February 2009	Paul's Boutique	Beastie Boys	1989	Nate Patrin		Yes		—	
26 March 2009	Histoire de Melody Nelson	Serge Gainsbourg	1971	Tom Ewing		Yes		—	
16 April 2009	The Bends	Radiohead	1995	Scott Plagenhoef		Yes		—	
2 July 2009	Reckoning	R.E.M.	1984	Matt LeMay		Yes		—	
7 September 2009	In Stereo/In Mono	The Beatles	2009	Mark Richardson	Yes	Yes		—	
9 September 2009	Rubber Soul	The Beatles	1965	Scott Plagenhoef		Yes		Reviewed as part of the In Stereo and In Mono box set reissue of the Beatles' catalog	
9 September 2009	Revolver	The Beatles	1966	Scott Plagenhoef		Yes		Reviewed as part of the In Stereo and In Mono box set reissue of the Beatles' catalog	
9 September 2009	Sgt. Pepper's Lonely Hearts Club Band	The Beatles	1967	Scott Plagenhoef		Yes		Reviewed as part of the In Stereo and In Mono box set reissue of the Beatles' catalog	
9 September 2009	Magical Mystery Tour	The Beatles	1967	Scott Plagenhoef		Yes		Reviewed as part of the In Stereo and In Mono box set reissue of the Beatles' catalog	
10 September 2009	The Beatles	The Beatles	1968	Mark Richardson		Yes		Reviewed as part of the In Stereo and In Mono box set reissue of the Beatles' catalog	
10 September 2009	Abbey Road	The Beatles	1969	Mark Richardson		Yes		Reviewed as part of the In Stereo and In Mono box set reissue of the Beatles' catalog	
11 September 2009	The Stone Roses	The Stone Roses	1989	Any Granzin		Yes		—	
11 December 2009	Everybody Knows This Is Nowhere	Neil Young	1969	Mark Richardson		Yes		—	
11 December 2009	After the Gold Rush	Neil Young	1970	Mark Richardson		Yes		—	
2 March 2010	Ladies and gentlemen we are floating in space	Spiritualized	1997	Grayson Haver Currin		Yes		—	
8 March 2010	Quarantine the Past	Pavement	2010	Matthew Perpetua	Yes	Yes		—	
30 March 2010	On Fire	Galaxie 500	1989	Mark Richardson		Yes		—	
19 May 2010	Exile on Main St.	The Rolling Stones	1972	Rob Mitchum		Yes		—	
10 June 2010	Disintegration	The Cure	1989	Nitsuh Abebe		Yes		—	
3 November 2010	Pinkerton	Weezer	1996	Ian Cohen		Yes		—	
22 November 2010	My Beautiful Dark Twisted Fantasy	Kanye West	2010	Ryan Dombal	Yes			—	
11 January 2011	Emergency & I	The Dismemberment Plan	1999	Paul Thompson		Yes		—	
27 September 2011	Nevermind	Nirvana	1991	Jess Harvell		Yes		—	
21 October 2011	Laughing Stock	Talk Talk	1991	Jess Harvell		Yes		—	
2 November 2011	The Smile Sessions	The Beach Boys	2011	Mark Richardson	Yes	Yes		—	
18 November 2011	Hatful of Hollow	The Smiths	1984	Douglas Wolk		Yes		—	
18 November 2011	The Queen is Dead	The Smiths	1986	Douglas Wolk		Yes		—	
28 November 2011	Siamese Dream	The Smashing Pumpkins	1993	Ned Raggett		Yes		—	
7 December 2011	20 Jazz Funk Greats	Throbbing Gristle	1979	Drew Daniel		Yes		—	
9 December 2011	Tago Mago	Can	1971	Douglas Wolk		Yes		—	
11 May 2012	Isn't Anything	my bloody valentine	1988	Mark Richardson		Yes		—	
11 May 2012	loveless	my bloody valentine	1991	Mark Richardson		Yes		—	
27 July 2012	Liquid Swords	GZA	1995	Ian Cohen		Yes		—	
13 August 2012	For Your Pleasure	Roxy Music	1973	Tom Ewing		Yes		—	
9 November 2012	Blue	Joni Mitchell	1971	Jessica Hopper		Yes		—	
9 November 2012	Court and Spark	Joni Mitchell	1974	Jessica Hopper		Yes		—	
9 November 2012	The Hissing of Summer Lawns	Joni Mitchell	1975	Jessica Hopper		Yes		—	
19 November 2012	The Disintegration Loops	William Basinski	2003	Mark Richardson		Yes		—	
20 November 2012	The Velvet Underground & Nico	The Velvet Underground & Nico	1967	Miles Raymer		Yes		—	
12 December 2012	Voodoo	D'Angelo	2000	Ryan Dombal		Yes		—	
16 January 2013	Donuts	J Dilla	2006	Nate Patrin		Yes		—	
23 January 2013	Illmatic	Nas	1994	Jeff Weiss		Yes		—	
8 February 2013	Rumours	Fleetwood Mac	1977	Jessica Hopper		Yes		—	
24 September 2013	In Utero	Nirvana	1993	Stuart Berman		Yes		—	
16 January 2014	White Light/White Heat	The Velvet Underground	1968	Douglas Wolk		Yes		—	
22 January 2014	Pink Moon	Nick Drake	1972	Jayson Greene		Yes		—	
9 April 2014	The Infamous	Mobb Deep	1995	Jayson Greene		Yes		—	
16 April 2014	Spiderland	Slint	1991	Stuart Berman		Yes		—	
25 April 2014	Surfer Rosa	Pixies	1988	Mike Powell				Reviewed in conjunction with Pixies' discography	
25 April 2014	Doolittle	Pixies	1989	Mike Powell				Reviewed in conjunction with Pixies' discography	
12 June 2014	Led Zeppelin II	Led Zeppelin	1969	Mark Richardson		Yes		—	
16 July 2014	Heaven or Las Vegas	Cocteau Twins	1990	Stephen M. Deusner		Yes		—	
5 November 2014	The Lonesome Crowded West	Modest Mouse	1997	Brian Howe		Yes		—	
24 November 2014	The Velvet Underground	The Velvet Underground	1969	Stuart Berman		Yes		—	
25 November 2014	It Takes a Nation of Millions to Hold Us Back	Public Enemy	1988	Craig Jenkins		Yes		—	
25 November 2014	Fear of a Black Planet	Public Enemy	1990	Craig Jenkins		Yes		—	
24 February 2015	Physical Graffiti	Led Zeppelin	1975	Mark Richardson		Yes		—	
19 June 2015	Sticky Fingers	The Rolling Stones	1971	Mark Richardson		Yes		—	
1 October 2015	Hunky Dory	David Bowie	1971	Douglas Wolk		Yes		—	
1 October 2015	The Rise and Fall of Ziggy Stardust and the Spiders from Mars	David Bowie	1972	Douglas Wolk		Yes		—	
4 November 2015	Loaded	The Velvet Underground	1970	Stuart Berman		Yes		—	
6 November 2015	Astral Weeks	Van Morrison	1968	Stephen Thomas Erlewine		Yes		—	
13 November 2015	People's Instinctive Travels and the Paths of Rhythm	A Tribe Called Quest	1990	Kris Ex		Yes		—	
25 November 2015	A Love Supreme	John Coltrane	1965	Mark Richardson		Yes		—	
22 January 2016	"Heroes"	David Bowie	1977	Ryan Dombal				Published as part of a series of reviews following the death of David Bowie	
22 January 2016	Low	David Bowie	1977	Laura Snapes				Published as part of a series of reviews following the death of David Bowie	
24 February 2016	Off the Wall	Michael Jackson	1979	Ryan Dombal		Yes		—	
13 April 2016	Ride the Lightning	Metallica	1984	Saby Reyes-Kulkarni		Yes		—	
29 April 2016	Dirty Mind	Prince	1980	Barry Walters				Awarded as part of a series of reviews following the death of Prince	
29 April 2016	Purple Rain	Prince	1984	Carvell Wallace				Awarded as part of a series of reviews following the death of Prince	
30 April 2016	Sign o' the Times	Prince	1987	Nelson George				Awarded as part of a series of reviews following the death of Prince	
30 April 2016	1999	Prince	1982	Maura Johnston				Awarded as part of a series of reviews following the death of Prince	
12 June 2016	Hounds of Love	Kate Bush	1985	Barry Walters			Yes	First Sunday Review	
26 June 2016	Tonight's the Night	Neil Young	1975	Mark Richardson			Yes	—	
30 July 2016	Nina Simone in Concert	Nina Simone	1964	Carvell Wallace		Yes		—	
21 August 2016	Songs in the Key of Life	Stevie Wonder	1976	Alan Light			Yes	—	
18 September 2016	Another Green World	Brian Eno	1975	Mike Powell			Yes	—	
1 October 2016	Music for 18 Musicians	Steve Reich	1978	Seth Colter Walls		Yes		—	
30 October 2016	Blood on the Tracks	Bob Dylan	1975	Jesse Jarnow			Yes	—	
1 November 2016	Metal Box	Public Image Ltd	1979	Simon Reynolds		Yes		—	
14 November 2016	Einstein on the Beach	Philip Glass	1979	Seth Colter Walls		Yes		—	
15 January 2017	Germfree Adolescents	X-Ray Spex	1978	Jenn Pelly			Yes	—	
5 February 2017	Homogenic	Björk	1997	Philip Sherburne			Yes	Originally given a 9.9 rating on release in 1997	
26 February 2017	Weezer	Weezer	1994	Jill Mapes			Yes	—	
7 March 2017	Either/Or	Elliott Smith	1997	Matt LeMay		Yes		—	
9 March 2017	Ready to Die	The Notorious B.I.G.	1994	Matthew Trammell				Reviewed to commemorate the 20th anniversary of the murder of the Notorious B.I.G.	
26 March 2017	Bach: The Goldberg Variations	Glenn Gould	1956	Seth Colter Walls			Yes	Two separate scores of two separate recordings of the same piece	
26 March 2017	Bach: The Goldberg Variations	Glenn Gould	1982	Seth Colter Walls			Yes	Two separate scores of two separate recordings of the same piece	
2 April 2017	Optimo EP	Liquid Liquid	1983	Sasha Frere-Jones			Yes	—	
4 June 2017	Supreme Clientele	Ghostface Killah	2000	Jeff Weiss			Yes	—	
16 July 2017	Appetite for Destruction	Guns N' Roses	1987	Maura Johnston			Yes	—	
3 August 2017	Taking Tiger Mountain (By Strategy)	Brian Eno	1974	Douglas Wolk		Yes		—	
3 August 2017	Before and After Science	Brian Eno	1977	Douglas Wolk		Yes		—	
2 December 2017	Master of Puppets	Metallica	1986	Andy O'Connor		Yes		—	
18 March 2018	Nebraska	Bruce Springsteen	1982	Mark Richardson			Yes	—	
28 April 2018	Trout Mask Replica	Captain Beefheart and His Magic Band	1969	Marc Masters		Yes		—	
2 May 2018	Exile in Guyville	Liz Phair	1993	Amanda Petruisch		Yes		Review focuses on box set version Girly-Sound to Guyville, which includes three tapes from Phair's Girly-Sound series	
3 June 2018	Live Through This	Hole	1994	Sasha Geffen			Yes	—	
10 June 2018	The Band	The Band	1969	Steven Hyden			Yes	—	
16 September 2018	Rid of Me	PJ Harvey	1993	Judy Berman			Yes	—	
23 September 2018	3 Feet High and Rising	De La Soul	1989	Jeff Chang			Yes	—	
11 October 2018	The Singles	Bikini Kill	1998	Jenn Pelly		Yes		—	
21 October 2018	Remain in Light	Talking Heads	1980	Dan Brooks			Yes	—	
13 January 2019	Spirit of Eden	Talk Talk	1988	Jeremy D. Larson			Yes	—	
3 February 2019	Journey in Satchidananda	Alice Coltrane	1971	Josephine Livingstone			Yes	—	
5 May 2019	Selected Ambient Works Volume II	Aphex Twin	1994	Philip Sherburne			Yes	—	
19 June 2019	The Complete Birth of the Cool	Miles Davis	1957	Nate Chinen		Yes		—	
11 November 2019	In the Court of the Crimson King	King Crimson	1969	Ryan Reed		Yes		—	
20 November 2019	Aja	Steely Dan	1977	Amanda Petrusich				Awarded as part of "Steely Dan Day"	
15 December 2019	The Chronic	Dr. Dre	1992	Sheldon Pearce			Yes	—	
22 December 2019	Tapestry	Carole King	1971	Jenn Pelly			Yes	—	
8 March 2020	Post	Björk	1995	Jenn Pelly			Yes	—	
5 April 2020	Head Hunters	Herbie Hancock	1973	Jeremy D. Larson			Yes	—	
17 April 2020	Fetch the Bolt Cutters	Fiona Apple	2020	Jenn Pelly	Yes			—	
23 April 2020	Fear of Music	Talking Heads	1979	Jayson Greene				Awarded as part of "Talking Heads Day"	
21 June 2020	Maggot Brain	Funkadelic	1971	Dave Segal			Yes	—	
31 October 2020	American Beauty	Grateful Dead	1970	Andy Cush		Yes		—	
8 August 2021	Born in the U.S.A.	Bruce Springsteen	1984	Sam Sodomsky			Yes	—	
19 September 2021	Look-Ka Py Py	The Meters	1969	Hanif Abdurraqib			Yes	—	
12 December 2021	Juju Music	King Sunny Adé	1982	Will Hernes			Yes	—	
27 February 2022	Talking Book	Stevie Wonder	1972	Carol Cooper				Awarded as part of "Stevie Wonder Day"	
27 February 2022	Innervisions	Stevie Wonder	1973	Craig Jenkins				Awarded as part of "Stevie Wonder Day"	
9 October 2022	Enter the Wu-Tang (36 Chambers)	Wu-Tang Clan	1993	Dylan Green				Awarded as part of a series of articles on the Wu-Tang Clan	
4 December 2022	Hejira	Joni Mitchell	1976	Jenn Pelly			Yes	—	
5 February 2023	Anthology of American Folk Music, Vol. 1-3	Various artists	1952	Grayson Haver Currin			Yes	—	
2 April 2023	Warren Zevon	Warren Zevon	1976	Andy Cush			Yes	—	
23 September 2023	Tim	The Replacements	1985	Jeremy D. Larson		Yes		—	
24 September 2023	Live at the Harlem Square Club, 1963	Sam Cooke	1985	Marc Hogan			Yes	—	
7 January 2024	Ambient 1: Music for Airports	Brian Eno	1978	Grayson Haver Currin			Yes	—	
4 February 2024	Live at the Liquid Room, Tokyo	Jeff Mills	1996	Gabriel Szatan			Yes	—	
19 May 2024	Judy at Carnegie Hall	Judy Garland	1961	Harry Tafoya			Yes	—	
17 November 2024	Wish You Were Here	Pink Floyd	1975	Sam Sodomsky			Yes	—	
15 December 2024	Solid Air	John Martyn	1973	Tal Rosenberg			Yes	—	
20 April 2025	Rain Dogs	Tom Waits	1985	Mark Richardson			Yes	—	
11 May 2025	Universal Consciousness	Alice Coltrane	1971	Andy Beta			Yes	—	
1 June 2025	Are You Experienced	The Jimi Hendrix Experience	1967	Grayson Haver Currin			Yes	—	
7 June 2025	Carrie & Lowell	Sufjan Stevens	2015	Jayson Greene		Yes		Originally given a 9.3 rating on release in 2015	
24 August 2025	Slanted and Enchanted	Pavement	1992	Mike Powell			Yes	Originally awarded a 10 in 2002 in a now-deleted review of reissue Luxe & Reduxe	
5 October 2025	Is This Desire?	PJ Harvey	1998	Ivy Nelson			Yes	—	
9 November 2025	Horses	Patti Smith	1975	Jenn Pelly			Yes	—	
22 January 2026	If You're Feeling Sinister	Belle and Sebastian	1996	Elizabeth Nelson			Yes	Reviewed as part of a series of notable albums from 1996	
