= Dividing by Zero =

Dividing By Zero

Studio album by Seven Storey
- Released: February 19, 2002
- Genres: Indie rock, punk, post-hardcore
- Length: 37:28
- Label: Deep Elm
- Producer: Lance Lammers

Seven Storey Mountain chronology
Based on a True Story (2000)	Dividing By Zero (2002)	At the Poles (2007)

Dividing By Zero is the fourth studio album released by the indie rock band Seven Storey Mountain, as well as its second and final while using the shortened moniker Seven Storey. It was released on February 19, 2002, by Deep Elm Records.

== Reception ==
Professional ratings
Review scores
Source	Rating
Allmusic	3/5 stars
MusicEmissions	4/5 stars
Splendidzine	Moderate
Ink19	Favorable
Interpunk	Favorable
Punknews	3.5/5 stars

Described as a mixture of "the emotive song structure of Washington, D.C., indie rock with the harsh playing of the New York hardcore scene", Dividing By Zero received a moderate to positive reception from critics.

Some of the record's most positive feedback came from Interpunk.com, where a critic called it "ten tracks of orchestrated rage...blending the finest aspects of hardcore power, punk energy, rock style and indie intelligence." The critic found that "[v]ocalist Lance Lammers has a perfect set of chops - equally harsh and melodic - presented with an overriding, forceful conviction" and concluded by saying "[t]hese are some of the best rock songs you've heard in a long, long time." Dennis Scanland at Music Emission was equally free with his praise of the album. For him, members of the band "get loud but never obnoxious and they stay focused even with their loud bursts that they erupt with at times." As a result, he said "Dividing By Zero is one of the strongest albums that I have heard so far this year", concluding it is "nice to see a young band with as much vision as Seven Storey."

J. Berk at Splendidzine wrote that "[t]he songs are jerky and intense, and provide a perfect backdrop for Lance Lammers' pissed-off vocals." Although Berk found Lammers' vocals to be "screamy at times", he was pleased they were "mostly restrained" and that Lammers' "obvious need to vent get in the way of turning in a few gentle melodies and catchy hooks." While Berk does not appear to have fallen in love with the album, he admits that he found it "unexpectedly satisfying on an intellectual level."

While some critics gave the record a more mediocre reception, even they could not hold back completely. Bettie Lou Vegas at Ink19 listened to the record and wrote: "Seven Storey is something I would have played into the ground in 1993. While I don't salivate over it now in 2002, it's still quite good." Scott at Punknews.org did not find that record outdated. He instead felt that the band might have had more to give. In his review, he wrote that "The album definitely has strong points with tracks like 'Unknown Satellite' and 'Dress Rehearsal', but the majority of the rest of the album only displays the band's potential. Give this band 5 more years with this new lineup and I bet they'll be able to do something amazing. Until then, they're be in semi-heavy rotation on my college radio show, because that's where good rock like this belongs."

== Track listing ==
No.	Title	Length
1.	"Instru. 1"	3:31
2.	"Unknown Satellite"	3:47
3.	"Flavor War"	4:10
4.	"Enough Already"	4:49
5.	"Second Rome"	3:43
6.	"Halfway"	1:57
7.	"No Return Address"	3:30
8.	"Dress Rehearsal"	3:43
9.	"Erase"	3:59
10.	"Paper and Quill"	4:19
