= Fender Toronado =

Guitar model by Fender

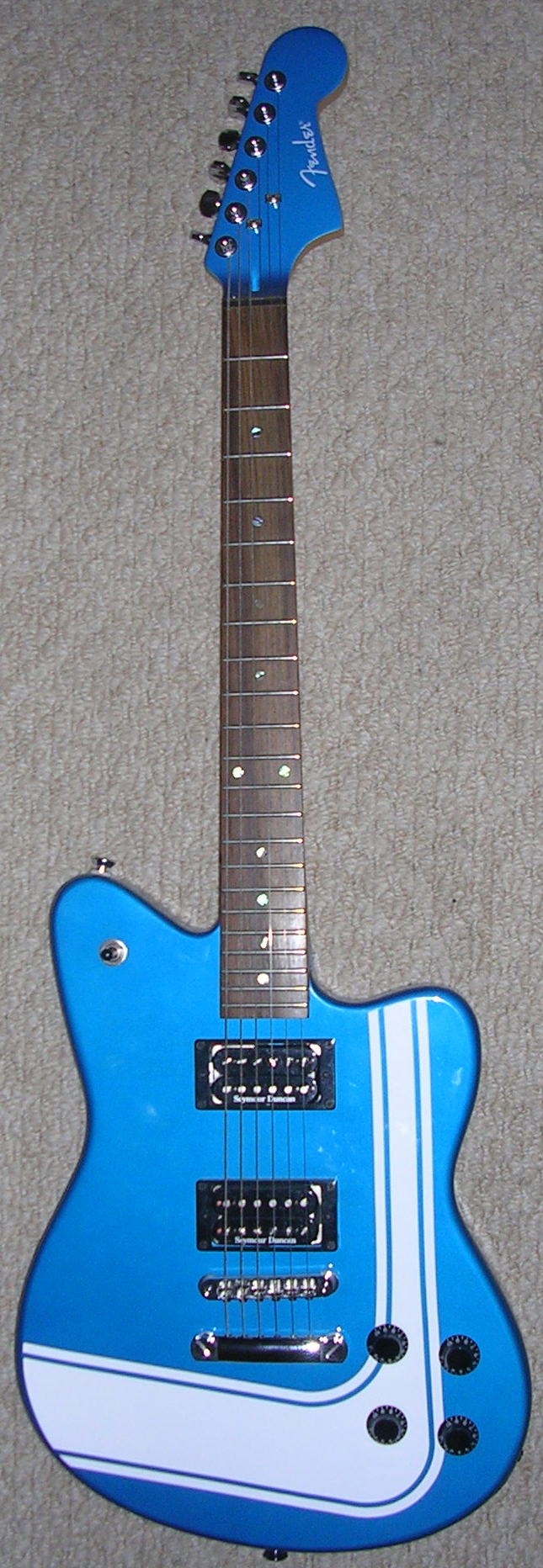
- A Fender Toronado GT HH
- Manufacturer: Fender
- Period: 1998–2003, 2004–2006

Construction
- Body type: Solid
- Neck joint: Bolt-on
- Scale: 24.75"

Woods
- Body: Alder Mahogany
- Neck: Maple
- Fretboard: Rosewood

Hardware
- Bridge: Adjusto-Matic Bridge with Anchored-Tailpiece or Fender Musicmaster 6 saddle string-thru bridge
- Pickup: 2 Humbucker

Colors available
- (Deluxe Series, as of 2006) Chrome Red, Blizzard Pearl, Navy Blue Metallic, Caramel Metallic, Olympic White

The Fender Toronado is an electric guitar made by Fender Musical Instruments Corporation. Introduced at the NAMM Show in 1998, it is a part of the "Deluxe Series" of Fender guitars produced in Mexico, generally to higher specs than most "Standard" models.

== Design ==
The Toronado features two Fender Atomic humbucking pickups, a rosewood fretboard, and four chrome knobs (2 volume and 2 tone). Many models also include a tortoise-shell pickguard. The headstock features the Fender "spaghetti" logo and sports vintage style Gotoh/Kluson tuners. The body shape shadows the designs of Fender's Jazzmaster and Jaguar guitars. The Toronado also has a 24.75" scale length—an unusual feature on a Fender guitar, as this scale length is usually associated with electric guitars manufactured by Gibson.

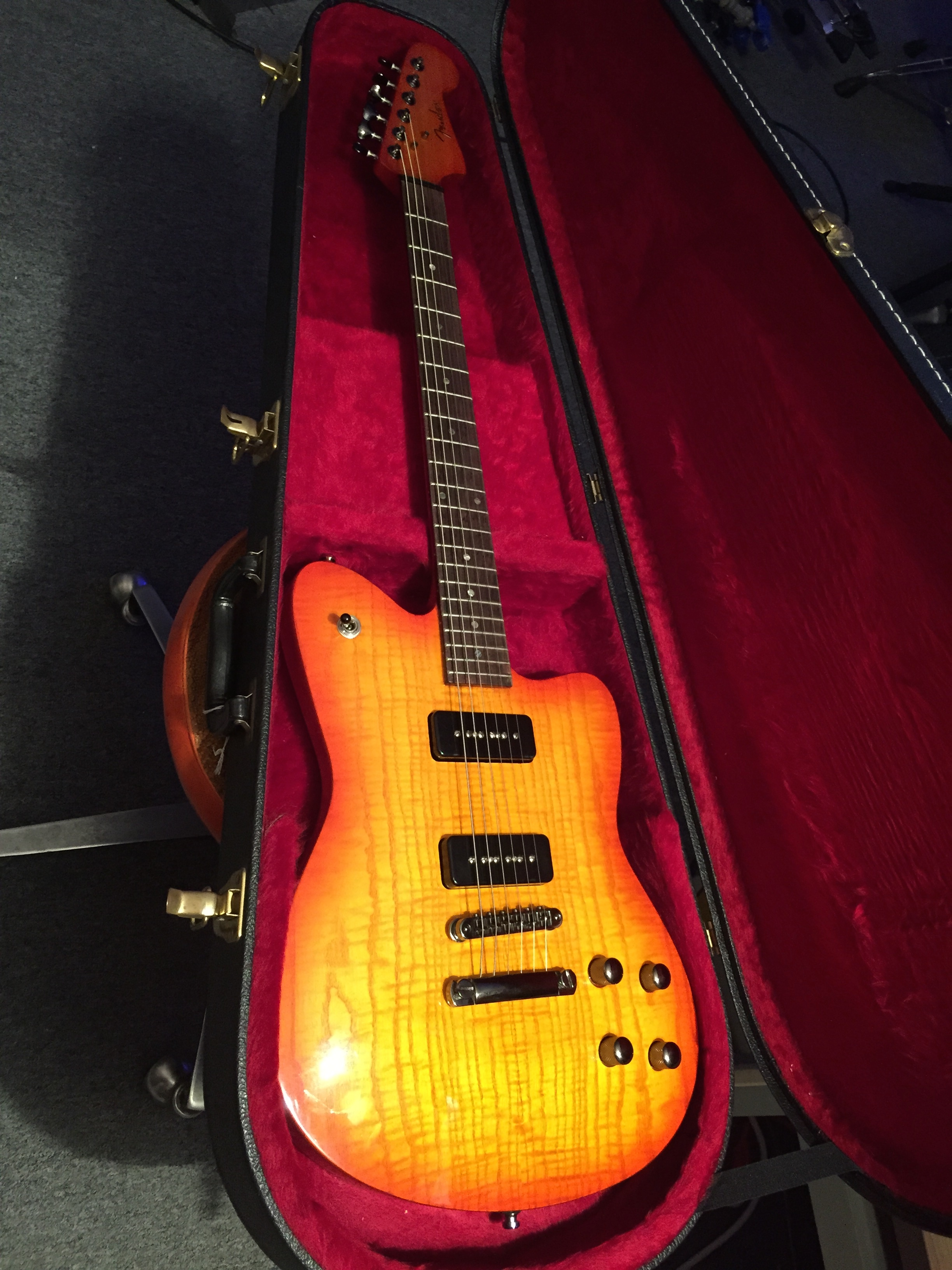
Toronado CTP90

The Toronado was reissued in 2004. This reissue has several differences from '98–'03 models, featuring more modern colors like Midnight Blue, Caramel Metallic, Blizzard Pearl and Chrome Red. The pickups are also open-coil as opposed to the covered humbuckers featured on the earlier models. The 2004 models were discontinued in 2006 and are rare due to their short 2-year production span. The Fender Toronado GT HH (05–06) was crafted in Korea, sporting a mahogany body with SH1N (neck) and SH14 (bridge) Seymour Duncan humbuckers. It was part of Fender's "Big Block" series. The guitar came in metallic finishes with a painted headstock and a racing stripe in a reverse L shape going from the left side of the body to the upper right horn. Unlike other variants of the Toronado, it has no pickguard.

Fender also made US Special and Highway One Toronado models, featuring Atomic II humbucking pickups or Black Dove P-90 style pickups. These models were available in a number of finishes, including Butterscotch Blonde, Black, Chrome Silver, Pewter Grey Metallic and Crimson Red Transparent. Later models were upgraded to feature a Fender Tech-Tonic one-piece wrap-around bridge and black headstock. Both the US Special and Highway One Toronado models were discontinued in 2004. Also around this time, Fender produced a short run of set neck Toronados out of Korea. The Toronado CT P90 featured a mahogany body with carved maple tops and were available in different sunburst colors.

As of January 2007, all Toronado variants had been discontinued by Fender.

In 2020, Fender's budget brand Squier reissued the Toronado as part of its Paranormal Series. The new model was available in black or Lake Placid blue, with an Indian Laurel fingerboard. In 2021, these finishes were replaced with 3-tone sunburst and Mystic Seafoam.

== Notable Toronado players ==
- Mariko Gotō (Midori)
- Aaron Turner (Isis)
- Al English (Youthmovies)
- Alex Fischel (Spoon)
- Alex Kapranos (Franz Ferdinand)
- Bill Campbell (The Throes)
- Brian Molko (Placebo)
- Chris Rea
- Conor Oberst (Bright Eyes)
- Jim Root (Slipknot)
- Joe Trohman (Fall Out Boy)
- Liam Lynch
- Giulio Signorotto (I Am Sonic Rain)
- Loren Rivera (Whirr)
- Mark Smith (Explosions in the Sky)
- Frank Iero (My Chemical Romance)
- Truls Heggero (Lukestar)
- Vic Fuentes (Pierce the Veil)
- Neige (Alcest)
- Mike Duce (Lower Than Atlantis)
- Neill Fraser (Villainy)
- Don Henley
- Toby Lind (Redwood Hill)
- Allen Hudson (Allen Hudson and The Halfmoons)
- Hillary Burton (honeychain)
