= The Poll Riders Win Again!!! =

Demo album by Walt Mink
- Released: 1991
- Recorded: January 1991
- Genre: Alternative rock, math rock, psychedelic rock
- Label: Self-released

Walt Mink chronology
Listen, Little Man (1990)	The Poll Riders Win Again!!! (1991)	Miss Happiness (1992)

Professional ratings
Review scores
Source	Rating
AllMusic	4/5 stars

The Poll Riders Win Again!!! is the second cassette demo tape by the American alternative rock band Walt Mink, released in 1991. As with their first demo tape, many of these songs would be re-recorded over the course of the band's career.

== Track listing ==
All tracks by John Kimbrough except where noted.

Side 1

1. "Everything Worthwhile"
2. "Miss Happiness"
3. "New Life"
4. "Pink Moon" (Nick Drake)
5. "Disappear"
6. "Pop Song"

Side 2

1. "Quiet Time"
2. "Smoothing The Ride"
3. "Twinkle & Shine"
4. "Erasable You"
5. "9 O'Clock World"
6. "Turn of the Religious"
7. "Sugartop"

== Personnel ==
- John Kimbrough – guitar, vocals
- Candice Belanoff – bass guitar, backing vocals
- Joey Waronker – drums, percussion, backing vocals
