= Lights & Motion =

Swedish musical project

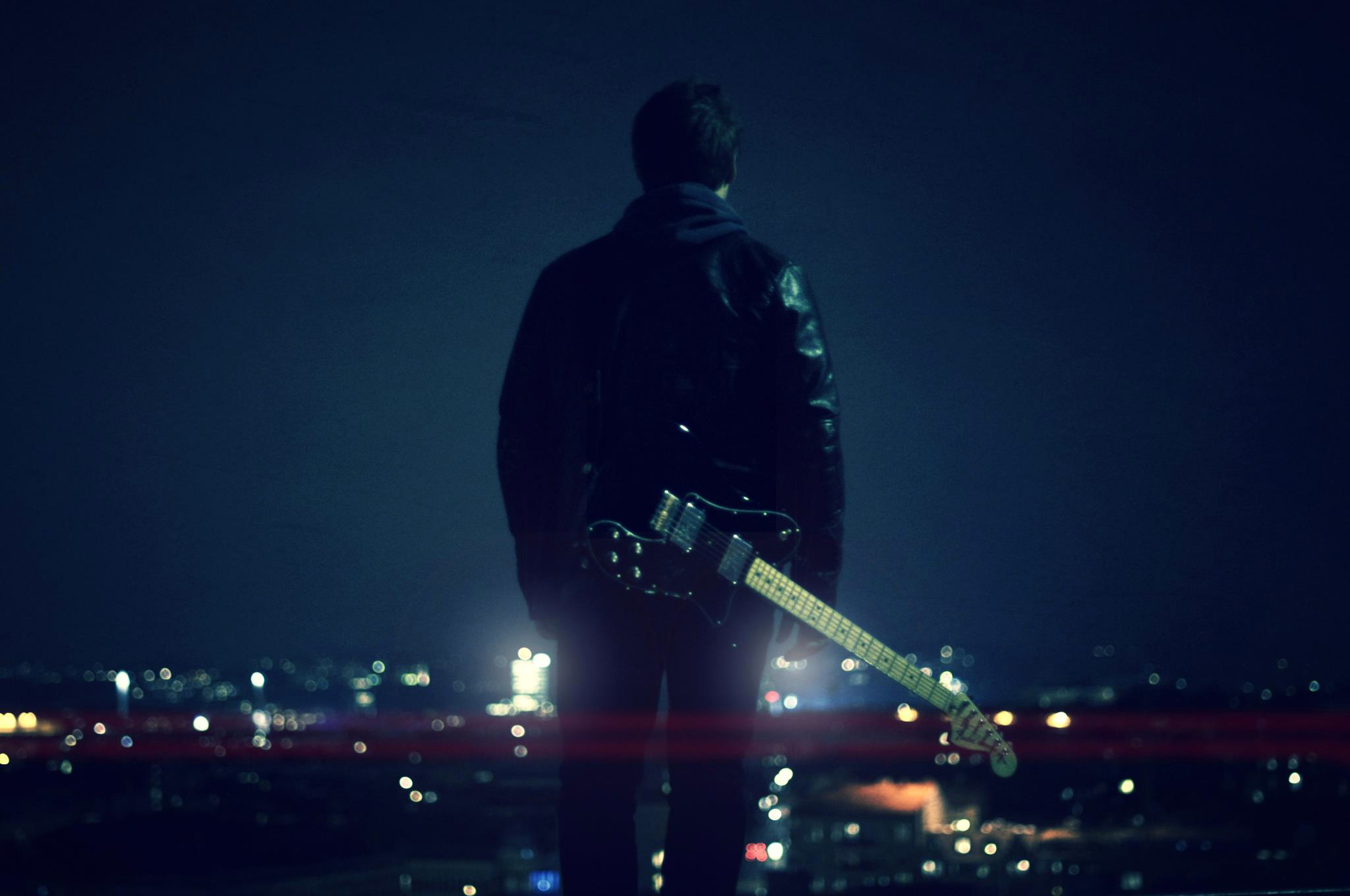

Background information
- Origin: Gothenburg, Sweden
- Genres: Post-rock; shoegaze; ambient; alternative rock; dream pop
- Years active: 2012–present
- Label: Deep Elm
- Members: Christoffer Franzén
- Website: www.lightsandmotion.com

Lights & Motion is a Swedish cinematic post-rock musical project, founded in Gothenburg 2012 by Christoffer Franzén.

The band has so far released seven full-length albums, Reanimation, Save Your Heart, Chronicle, Dear Avalanche, The Great Wide Open, The World I Remember, and Wonder, a Bloom mini-album series, a mini-album While We Dream, and a live album Live at Offside Festival, all released through the American independent record label, Deep Elm Records. Franzén gained worldwide recognition when his music was featured in Google's commercial at the Oscars in 2013. Music from Lights & Motion has been used in many film trailers, commercials and TV shows, including an Academy Awards ceremony and Super Bowl. In 2015, Apple featured the band's music in their global iTunes Campaign, "Latest Films. Anywhere, Anytime."

== Christoffer Franzén ==
Christoffer Franzén
- Born: 11 June 1988 (age 38)
- Genres: Post-rock, alternative rock, ambient, shoegazing, dream pop
- Occupations: Music producer, Film composer
- Instruments: Vocals, electric guitar, acoustic guitar, bass guitar, drums, percussion, keyboards, programming, piano, synthesizer, glockenspiel
- Years active: 2010–present
- Label: Deep Elm Records
- Website: facebook.com/lightsandmotion

Christoffer Franzén (Swedish pronunciation: [krɪˈstɔ̌fːɛr franˈseːn]) is a Swedish composer, producer and multi-instrumentalist from Gothenburg. He is known for his Lights & Motion, in which he plays all the instruments and writes all the music.

He is responsible for lead vocals, electric guitar, acoustic guitar, bass guitar, drums, piano, keyboards, synthesizers, organ, glockenspiel, samples, orchestration, production, and percussion. Franzén has been a long time user of Fender Guitars. He has used the Telecaster, most notably, the 72 deluxe reissue and the thinline.

In December 2013, Lights & Motion was voted as "The Best New Artist" in the annual polls by Post-rock on Facebook, the world's largest post-rock community.

== History ==
=== Formation ===
Lights & Motion was formed in Gothenburg, Sweden in early-2012 by Christoffer Franzén. Originally meant as an outlet during a period of insomnia, the project was supposed to reflect the sense of a dreamlike state in which a lot of the first album was written in. However, the project quickly garnered attention online, mainly in alternative and post-rock communities, which led to Franzén being signed by American independent record label Deep Elm Records. Originally a guitarist, Franzén started to experiment with writing and recording music by himself in 2011 and 2012, and soon came to the conclusion that just writing with the guitar was too limiting.

I would try all these different instruments and record myself over and over in layers, so that I could make it sound huge and not just like one guy in a dark room. I just had such a need for control and I knew exactly what I wanted, so I ended up doing every single thing by myself. I learned all the instruments I needed for what I could hear in my head, and I recorded and recorded and recorded until my ears bled, and slowly I got better at it.

— Christoffer Franzén in an interview in 2013.

A self-taught musician, Franzén also learned how to produce, engineer and mix his own works.

=== Reanimation (2011–2013) ===
Reanimation was written in a period between late-2011 and December 2012, and was then released worldwide on January 16, 2013 through Deep Elm Records. Although setting the tone for the band's future releases, Reanimation features more prominent guitars. The song "Faded Fluorescence" was used in the 2015 Super Bowl trailer for Furious 7, and "Home" was used in the TV spots for the film Collateral Beauty.

=== Save Your Heart (2013) ===
On November 12, 2013, Lights & Motion released their sophomore album, Save Your Heart. The album contains 11 songs, and it was written and recorded during 2013. When compared to its predecessor, Save Your Heart is based around piano and synthesizers. Franzén can be heard in several interviews talking about how he can "hear sounds as colors", and he has stated about the new album; "I wanted Save Your Heart to have more of a blueish or violet color in terms of sonic identity. In comparison, Reanimation had more of a yellowish tone'. The opening song of the album, "Heartbeats", was used in the trailer for the motion picture Concussion.

=== Chronicle (2015) ===
The band released their third full-length album called Chronicle , on January 13, 2015, through Deep Elm Records. The album contains nine songs and ranges in style from Post-rock/ambient, to feature elements of film music. This record is considered being the band's most cinematic accomplishment to date.

=== 2016 ===
In 2016 his song "Stardust" was featured in the trailers for the film Rules Don't Apply.

=== Dear Avalanche (2017) ===
In the summer of 2016, the band announced on their Facebook page that their fourth full-length album would be released in early 2017, through Deep Elm Records. On November 17 Lights & Motion released an Official Trailer for the upcoming album, where they stated that the record would be called Dear Avalanche, and would be released worldwide on 1/20/17. Later the same year they released the single We Only Have Forever (Quiet), which featured a minimalistic and slowed down re-interpretation of the song, played on the piano. In 2017 Apple chose to include two of the band's songs in their Memories Function available on all Apple devices globally. The song "Anamorphic" was heavily featured in the trailer for the film Skyscraper, which premiered during the 2018 Super Bowl.

=== Bloom (2018) ===
In late-2017, it was announced by Christoffer Franzén that he had spent the better part of a year writing a new mini-album set to be released in the early months of 2018. Called Bloom, it consists of five songs tied thematically to long, Swedish winters.

=== While We Dream (2018) ===
Lights & Motion released their second EP, While We Dream, during the fall of this year, following the previous EP Bloom. It came out in October and consisted of six songs.

=== 2019 ===
During 2019 he scored the film Sea Fever, directed by Neasa Hardiman, which premiered at the Toronto International Film Festival.

=== The Great Wide Open (2020) ===
On May 15, 2020, Lights & Motion released their fifth album called The Great Wide Open.

== Discography ==
Year	Album	Release type	Chart positions
Year	Album	Release type	US
2013	Reanimation	Studio album	
2013	Save Your Heart	Studio album	
2015	Chronicle	Studio album	
2017	Dear Avalanche	Studio album	
2018	Bloom	Mini-album	
2018	While We Dream	Mini-album	
2020	The Great Wide Open	Studio album	
2022	The World I Remember	Studio album	
2024	Wonder	Studio album	
2025	Live at Offside Festival	Live album	
2026	Bloom II	Mini-album	

=== As Christoffer Franzén ===
- Dreamweaver (2015)
- Phenomenon (2017)
- Mountain (2019)
- Ghost of You (2020)
- Endeavour (2021)
- Fusion: Music for TV & Film (2022)
- Reflections (2023)

== Filmography ==
Film-scores

- Making A Killing (2022)
- Sea Fever (2019)
- At The End Of The Day (2018)
- In I Dimman (2018)

== In popular culture ==
- The first trailer for the Universal produced film Lone Survivor uses "Aerials" as its intro-music.
- The film Homefront uses the track "Faded Fluorescence" in its first two trailers.
- The movie Transcendence starring Johnny Depp and Morgan Freeman, features "We Are Ghosts" in its first theatrical trailer.
- Google used "The March" for its commercial that aired worldwide on television during the Academy Awards 2013, featuring all the oscar nominated films of that year.
- American NBC used the track "Home" in their promos for the TV-show The New Normal.
- Lights & Motion provided additional guitars, keyboard, string arrangements and programming for Australian metalcore band I Killed the Prom Queen's third full-length studio album Beloved.
- Their song Heartbeats was used in the promotional trailer for the film La Vida Robot.
- "Drift" was used by Sky Arts in their promotional trailers for Playhouse Presents.
- "Drift" was used by NBC in their Tour de France Promo.
- "Home" was used by BBC in their television ads for Polands Independence.
- "Reanimation" was used in NBC's So You Think You Can Dance.
- "Ultraviolet" was used in the promotional commercials for the NBC show A to Z.
- "Drift" was used by Budweiser in their Canadian commercials.
- "Drift" was used by Rip Curl in their commercials for their SurfGPS Watch campaign.
- "Home" was used in the Government of Poland's new TV commercial and promo campaign "Spring Into New", airing on CNN, BBC etc.
- "Home" was used in the trailer for the film Meet the Mormons.
- "Atlas" was used in a commercial for Visa Inc., narrated by Morgan Freeman.
- "Departure" was used by GoPro in their "Line of the Winter" video.
- "Faded Fluorescence" was used in the 2015 Super Bowl trailer for Furious 7. The trailer by Lights & Motion was awarded "Best Of Show" and "Best Action Trailer" at the 16th annual Golden Trailer Awards in Beverly Hills, Hollywood.
- "Fireflies" was featured in The Vampire Diaries episode "Let Her Go".
- "We Are Ghosts" was featured in Apple's Academy Awards 2015 spot.
- "Antlers" was featured in Samsung's HD TV campaign.
- "Reborn" was used by NBC in a trailer for the TV show A.D. The Bible Continues, which is a continuation of the show The Bible.
- "Crystalline" was used in a promo for NBC's The Voice.
- "Lend Me the Courage of Stars" was used in the televised ad campaign "For the Hero in All of Us" for NBC Universal and WWE.
- "The Spectacular Quiet" was used by The Guardian in their "Keep It in the Ground" campaign video.
- "Heartbeats" was used by Google during their Google I/O 2015 Keynote in San Francisco.
- "Requiem" was used in the trailer for the motion picture No Escape.
- "Heartbeats" was used in the second trailer for the motion picture Concussion.
- "Glow" was featured in The Vampire Diaries episode "Hold me, Thrill me, Kiss me".
- "Fireflies" was featured in The Vampire Diaries episode "This Woman's Work".
- "Home" was used in the season finale for the mini TV series Containment.
- "Ultraviolet" was used by NBC in their promos for American Ninja Warrior.
- "Home" was used in the TV-spots for the movie Collateral Beauty.
- "This Explosion Within" was featured in The Vampire Diaries episode "It's Been a Hell of a Ride".
- "Silver Lining" and "Perfect Symmetry" was featured in The Vampire Diaries episode "We're Planning a June Wedding".
- "Silver Lining" and "Fireflies" was chosen by Apple to be included in their Memories Function on all of their devices globally.
- "Anamorphic" was heavily featured in the trailer for the film Skyscraper which was launched after 2018's Super Bowl at The Tonight Show with Jimmy Fallon.
- "Texas" was used by Turner Classic Movies in their "Summer under the stars" promos on TV.
- "Glow" was used in the trailers for the movie Beautiful Boy (2018 film).
- "This Explosion Within" was used in the HBO promos for their "Seeing Is Believing" campaign.
- "Lion" was used by the BBC and Discovery in their Unmissable campaign, featuring footage from the Planet Earth series.
- "Glaciers" was used in the final trailer for the documentary film Emanuel.
- "Built to Last" was used in the final trailer for the 2020 film The Way Back.

== Videography ==
- Home (2013)
- The March (2014)
- The Spectacular Quiet (2015)
- Reborn (2015)
- Paper Wings (2015)
- As They Sleep (2017)
- We Are Infinite (2018)
