= Seven Storey Mountain =

US musical group

- Also known as: Seven Storey
- Origin: Phoenix, Arizona, United States
- Genres: Post-hardcore, Indie rock, Alternative rock, Emo
- Years active: 1994–present
- Labels: Thick Records, Deep Elm, Art Monk Construction
- Members: Lance Lammers
- Past members: Rich Van Syckel; Dave King; Chad Kinney; Dave Norwood; Rob Wheeler; Jason Kileen; Thomas Lanser; Aaron Wendt; Jesse Everhart
- Website: sevenstoreymountain.com

Seven Storey Mountain was an American rock group from Phoenix, Arizona. The group's music was heavily influenced by the early Washington, D.C. post-hardcore scene.

The band formed in 1994 as a three-piece, featuring singer/guitarist Lance Lammers, bassist Jesse Everhart, and drummer Thomas Lanser. The trio had two releases on indie label Art Monk Construction, a 1996 self-titled E.P. and the 1997 L.P. Leper Ethics. The band broke up in early 1997 shortly before the release of Leper Ethics. Everhart and Lanser continued using the name Seven Storey Mountain for a short time in Lammers' absence, drafting Aaron Wendt as a singer/bassist and Jason Kileen as lead guitarist, with Everhart switching from bass to second guitar. Lammers rejoined his former bandmates later that year and reverted the band back to the original three piece configuration. This reformation would only last a few months and permanently disbanded in 1998. Material recorded by this trio from late 1997-1998 was released on the album Based on True Story in 2000 by Deep Elm Records and included several songs Lammers had previously recorded on his own.

Lammers formed a new band in 2001 which he abbreviated Seven Storey. The new lineup, featuring Dave Norwood on bass and Chad Kinney on drums, released Dividing By Zero on Deep Elm in 2002. The band began a national tour with Local H and Injected in November 2001. Seven Storey disbanded shortly thereafter. A handful of leftover demo tracks that Lammers recorded on his own were released on a split EP with Brandtson and Camber in 2003.

Continuing to work on new material over the next couple of years, Lammers re-adopted the original Seven Storey Mountain moniker for a 2007 album, At the Poles, released on Thick Records. The album was recorded and performed solely by Lammers, and drew comparisons to Frodus and Fugazi. A new live band played shows from 2005-2007 that featured Rich Van Syckel on bass and Dave King on drums.

May 2015 saw the release of the 7 song EP "A La Mierda". Like "At The Poles" this album was written, performed and recorded by Lammers, this time at Fidelity Unlimited Recording in Portland, OR.

In June 2023, Lammers, aged 50, was found dead alongside the bodies of his parents in what police described as an apparent murder-suicide.

== Discography ==
- Seven Storey Mountain EP (Art Monk Construction, 1996)
- Leper Ethics LP (Art Monk Construction, 1997)
- LLE EP (Self-Released, 1997)
- Conservatory EP (Self-Released, 1997)
- Based on a True Story EP (Deep Elm Records, 2000)
- Dividing By Zero LP (Deep Elm Records, 2002)
- At the Poles LP (Thick Records, 2007)
- A La Mierda EP (Self-Released, 2015)

== Compilations ==
- (Don't Forget To) Breathe - Track: "No Promise" (Crank Records, 1997)
- Exile On Cameron Harper Street - Track: "Your Lips" (Epiphany Records, 1997)
- 411VM - Issue 24 - Skate Video Soundtrack - Track: "Fall", 1997
- The Emo Diaries - Chapter 2: A Million Miles Away - Track: "Incomplete" (Deep Elm Records, 1998)
- Virtually Alternative VA-95 - Track: "Politician" (Virtually Alternative, 1998)
- Rocksound Punk Rawk Explosion 7 - Track: "So Soon" (Rock Sound, 2000)
- Records For The Working Class No.2 - Track: "So Soon" (Deep Elm Records, 2000)
- Not One Light Red: A Modified Document - Track: "Second Rome" (Sunset Alliance 2000)
- Sound Spirit Fury Fire - Track: "Third Rome" (Deep Elm Records, 2001)
- Not One Light Red: A Desert Extended - Track: "Time To Go" (Sunset Alliance, 2002)
- Emo Is Awesome, Emo Is Evil - Track: "Unknown Satellite" (Deep Elm Records, 2002)
- Deep Elm Unreleased No. 1 - Track: : "6.8.2000" (Deep Elm Records, 2002)
- Deep Elm Sampler No. 4: Hearts Bleed Blue – Track: "Unknown Satellite" (Deep Elm Records, 2002)
- Brandtson / Camber / Seven Storey (Split EP) - Tracks: "New Day" and "Covers" (Deep Elm Records), 2003)

== Members ==
- Lance Lammers - Vocals, Guitar, Bass, Drums (1994–present)
- Rich Van Syckel - Bass (2005–2007, live only)
- Dave King - Drums (2005–2007, live only)
- Dave Norwood - Bass (2001)
- Chad Kinney - Drums (2001)
- Rob Wheeler - Drums (1997)
- Jason Kileen - Guitar (1997, live only)
- Aaron Wendt - Bass (1997, live only)
- Thomas Lanser - Drums (1994–1997, 1997–1998)
- Jesse Everhart - Bass (1994–1997, 1997–1998)
