= The Dandelion War =

American post-rock band

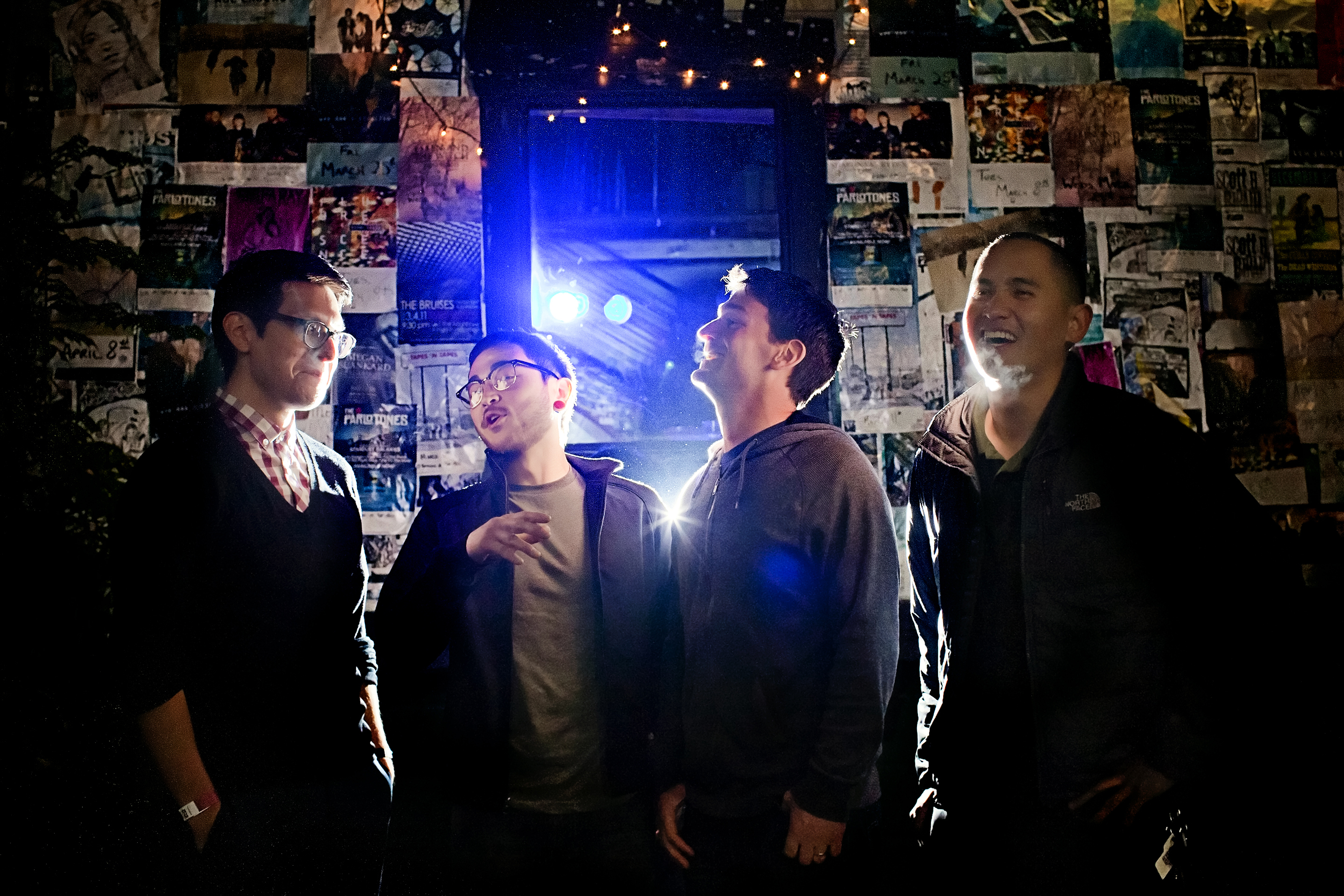
- The Dandelion War

Background information
- Origin: Oakland, California, U.S.
- Genres: Post-rock
- Years active: 2008-present
- Label: Deep Elm Records

The Dandelion War is an American Post-Rock band from Oakland, California. Formed in 2008, the band is currently signed to Deep Elm Records. The band's debut album Geometries and Orchids was released independently in 2010. A follow-up, We Were Always Loyal to Lost Causes, was released by Deep Elm in 2012. Deep Elm also re-released Geometries and Orchids in 2012. The band's third album, Opposite Shores, was released on November 18, 2014. Lead vocalist Larry Fernández died on March 9, 2024.

== Music ==
The Dandelion War combines elements of post-rock and atmospheric indie music. The band's sound relies a stark contrasts between quiet minimalism and colossal crescendos. AbsolutePunk described the band as "sounding like what would happen if someone melted Explosions In The Sky, Radiohead and The Antlers’ Hospice together." The Dandelion War has also been compared to Sigur Ros and My Morning Jacket.

The band reached critical acclaim with the release of We Were Always Loyal to Lost Causes in 2012. The album was listed as one of the year's top releases by The Alternative Tone (#13), Team Reasonable (#10), and PopBlerd (#10).

== Live Shows and Touring ==
The Dandelion War has toured up and down the west coast since 2010 and has become a mainstay of the San Francisco Bay Area music scene. The band has opened for Imagine Dragons, Asobi Seksu, The Appleseed Cast, Cymbals Eat Guitars, and Caspian, among others.

In 2013, the band played San Francisco's acclaimed Noise Pop Festival.

== Band members ==
- Larry Fernández - vocals
- Jeff Kay - guitar and keyboards
- Mikey Fuson - guitar
- Mario Roque - bass
- Julius Masibay - drums

== Past members ==
- David Tran - keyboard
- Chris Strebel - bass

== Discography ==
- Geometries and Orchids (2010, self-released, 2012 re-issue by Deep Elm Records)
- We Were Always Loyal to Lost Causes (2012, Deep Elm Records)
- Opposite Shores (2014, self-released)
