= Walt Mink =

American alternative rock band

- Origin: St. Paul, Minnesota, U.S.
- Genres: Alternative rock, math rock, psychedelic rock
- Years active: 1989–1997
- Labels: Caroline Records, Atlantic Records, Deep Elm Records
- Past members: John Kimbrough; Candice Belanoff; Zach Danziger; Orestes Morfin; Joey Waronker

Walt Mink were an American alternative rock power trio from St. Paul, Minnesota. They were formed in 1989 by guitarist-singer-songwriter John Kimbrough, drummer Joey Waronker, and bassist Candice Belanoff. The band released four studio albums over the course of their eight-year career.

== History ==
=== Early days, 1990–91 ===
John Kimbrough (son of actor Charles Kimbrough) and Joey Waronker (son of music executive Lenny Waronker) had briefly attended high school together in Massachusetts and reconvened at Macalester College, a small liberal arts school in St. Paul, Minnesota. Looking for a bass player to fill out a trio, they were introduced to Candice Belanoff, another Macalester student, who had only been playing for a few months, and Walt Mink was formed in February 1989, named after a beloved psychology professor.

The band started out by playing at college house parties on the weekends, and in December 1989, a fellow student offered to record them for a 7" single he was releasing on his own independent label, Skene! Records. With that, the band made their first trip into the studio, recording versions of the songs "Fragile" and "Croton-Harmon (local)", both of which would later appear in newer versions on the albums Miss Happiness and Bareback Ride.

In March 1990, the trio began recording what was to become Listen Little Man!, an album-length cassette demo, recorded on a four-track machine in the basement of the house John and Joey were living in at the time. Distributed to friends and sold on consignment in local record stores, the tape gained modest notoriety and furthered the name of the band in the Twin Cities.

By the end of the spring, the members of Walt Mink pledged to pursue the goal of getting more club gigs in Minneapolis after going their separate ways over the summer. When they returned to the Twin Cities in September, they found a large house in the uptown section of Minneapolis that had been owned at one time by a music production company and had been renovated in order to accommodate loud rock bands, complete with a large, soundproofed rehearsal room. It was here that they began recording their second full-length demo cassette, The Poll Riders Win Again!!!, in February 1991.

After opening for Babes in Toyland in December 1990, Babes drummer Lori Barbero became a fan and tipped off a friend who worked at the New Music Seminar in New York City. This led to a spot at the seminar for the band, and in June 1991 they traveled to New York for their first out-of-state show. It was here they were introduced to Matt Quigley, a former member of the band Skunk (and later of Vaganza, with whom both Waronker and Kimbrough played at different times), who became a fan and, armed with copies of the band's demos, quickly alerted friends to their existence. One of those friends was Janet Billig, the label manager of the New York independent record label Caroline Records, who liked the tapes and contacted the band about playing another New York show.

Walt Mink continued to play in Minneapolis throughout the summer of 1991, garnering much local press and building a respectable fan base. In October, they returned to New York to play at the CMJ music conference, and it was here that Billig finally saw them live. After the show, she offered to sign them to Caroline Records.

=== Caroline Records, 1992–93 ===
The band began recording their first album at Smart Studios in Madison, Wisconsin in March 1992. Released in June 1992, Miss Happiness provided the impetus for a hefty amount of touring, both in the United States and the United Kingdom, in support of The Lemonheads, Firehose, Pavement, Mudhoney and others. It was also in the spring of this year that the band made their first video. Directed by Kevin Kerslake, the video for "Chowdertown" aired on MTV's 120 Minutes on July 9, 1992.

After touring their way out to L.A., recording of the second record began there in February 1993. Bareback Ride was released in June of that year and paved the way for continued touring, both as headliners and as support for bands such as Hole, Urge Overkill, Paul Westerberg and Cracker, among others. It was also in the spring of '93 that the band made their second video, for the song "Fragile." Directed by Miguel Arteta, the video was rejected by MTV but received airplay on a variety of other video programs.

While touring to support the new record, the band began to address the question of where to go after their two-record contract with Caroline Records was fulfilled. Billig had since left the label to manage bands at Gold Mountain Records, a company whose clients included Nirvana and Beastie Boys, and as Walt Mink's new manager, she began the process of shopping them to major labels. By mid-summer of 1993, the band had decided that Columbia Records seemed to be the most enthusiastic, and so while on tour in Memphis, Tennessee, the three members signed a six-record contract under a statue of the great blues songwriter W.C. Handy.

Touring continued throughout that summer and into the fall, pausing only briefly to shoot the band's third video, for the song "Shine". Directed by Sofia Coppola, and shot by Spike Jonze, the video was filmed at the Coppola vineyard in Rutherford, California, in and around the family swimming pool.

=== Loss and label troubles, 1993–96 ===
In October 1993, Waronker moved back to his hometown of Los Angeles. Soon John and Candice relocated to their hometown as well, arriving in New York City in February 1994. While John worked on writing songs, Joey began playing in L.A. with the as-yet-unknown singer Beck. By the late spring of that year, with the success of the album Mellow Gold keeping him busy as Beck's drummer, Joey left Walt Mink.

The summer of 1994 was devoted to finding a new drummer for the band. John and Candice finally found one in the person of Orestes Morfin, formerly of the band Bitch Magnet. They quickly began rehearsing in preparation for a small fall tour, to be followed by the recording of their Columbia debut.

On the last night of that tour the band arrived home to find that the plug had been pulled on their record, and they promptly asked to be released from their contract. The label obliged, and the band worked to find another record deal. Billig, who had left their management company that fall to become an executive at Atlantic Records, expressed interest, and in February of '95 the band signed a one-record deal with Atlantic.

Recording of what was now to be their Atlantic debut began in April of that year at Dreamland Recording Studios near Woodstock, New York, with John Agnello producing. The process continued through that spring and into the summer, and after mixing once in Chicago it was determined that the record needed to be mixed again, which it later was.

El Producto was released in January 1996, and from the beginning there were ominous signs. On the first day of their first tour supporting the record, the band discovered that their A&R person had just been fired. In spite of an uplifting piece about the band in Billboard that day, in which it cheerfully asserted that after so many disappointments it seemed that Walt Mink was finally going to get a chance to be heard, the mood of the moment was one of deep uncertainty.

The spring of '96 was to be the last significant period of touring for Walt Mink. February through May were spent both headlining and opening for bands like Tripping Daisy and Tracy Bonham. In June, Atlantic dropped the band, part of a great "purge" which saw the label drop nearly half its artist roster.

The band's next album was mixed at Smart Studios in November 1996. About this time, Orestes left the band to pursue a degree in hydrology at the University of Arizona.

=== Deep Elm and the beginning of the end, 1997–present ===
By early 1997, several independent labels had expressed interest in the record, but it was finally Deep Elm who John and Candice decided was the right fit. The record, Colossus, was released in June of that year, but the two remaining members had given up on the idea of finding a replacement drummer for touring, planning instead to occasionally perform as an acoustic duo. The band's fourth and last video, for the song "Brave Beyond the Call", was filmed during this period. Directed by Adam Rothlein, the video was shown briefly on MTV.

At this point, the group met Will Tanous, a friend who had wanted Colossus on his label, and who also worked for the HBO live music show Reverb. Drummer Zach Danziger first appeared with Walt Mink on the June 20, 1997, broadcast of Reverb. Armed with a new drummer, the reinvigorated members of Walt Mink contemplated a tour supporting Colossus.

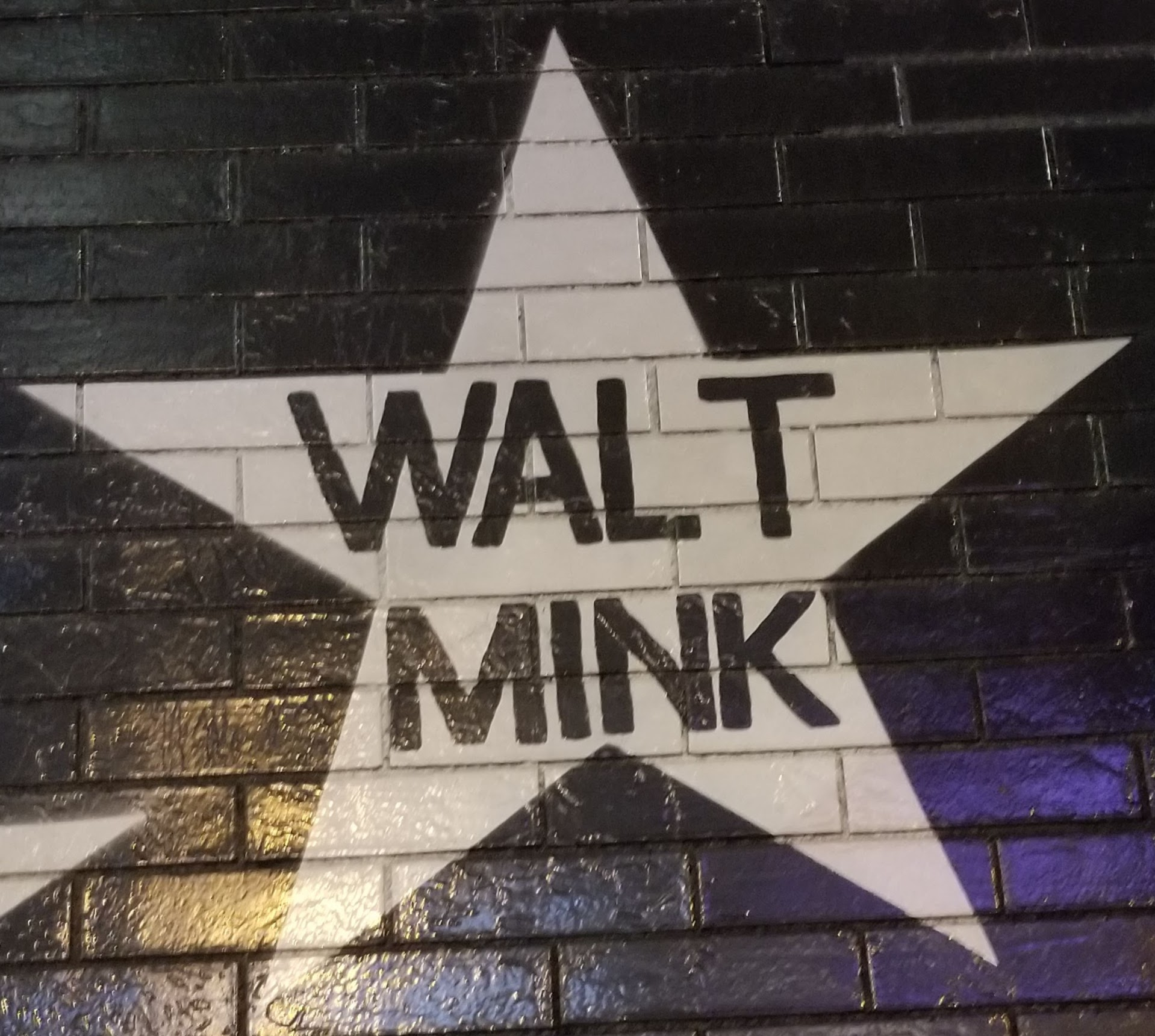
Walt Mink's star on the outside mural of the Minneapolis nightclub First Avenue

Meanwhile, the band's business infrastructure was eroding badly; within a matter of weeks in mid-1997, the group, who had been dropped by their management the previous year, was dropped by their booking agent and accountant, and with no money coming in there was virtually no way to pay for a tour. John Szuch, the label head of Deep Elm, got them a new booking agent and gave them a small amount of tour support, but his label's modest financial resources were no match for the demands of a band on an extensive tour.

The band undertook a final two-week tour through the upper Midwest and parts of New England, but after playing to virtually empty venues, it was decided that it was time to end the band. The band played a final concert at the Mercury Lounge in New York on November 1, 1997, which was recorded and later released as Goodnite.

Since 1997 the band has occasionally reunited to play one-off shows. John Kimbrough went on to play with New York power-pop band Valley Lodge; while pursuing a career as a composer for film and television. He moved into music production with Tenacious D's third album, Rize of the Fenix.

The band has been honored with a star on the outside mural of the Minneapolis nightclub First Avenue, recognizing performers that have played sold-out shows or have otherwise demonstrated a major contribution to the culture at the iconic venue. Receiving a star "might be the most prestigious public honor an artist can receive in Minneapolis," according to journalist Steve Marsh.

== Discography ==
- Listen, Little Man! (self-released demo, 1990)
- The Poll Riders Win Again!!! (self-released demo, 1991)
- Miss Happiness (Caroline Records, 1992)
- Bareback Ride (Caroline Records, 1993)
- El Producto (Atlantic Records, 1996)
- Colossus (Deep Elm Records, 1997)
- Goodnite (Deep Elm Records, 1998)

== Other appearances ==
- Dü Hüskers: The Twin Cities Replay Zen Arcade (Synapse Recordings, 1993)
- Unreleased No. 2 (Deep Elm Records, 2003)
