= Surrounded (band) =

Swedish alternative rock band

- Origin: Växjö, Sweden
- Genres: Indie rock, alternative rock, space rock
- Years active: 2000–present
- Labels: One Little Indian, Make My Day Records, Deep Elm
- Members: Marten Rydell; Marcus Knutsson; Tom Malmros; Johannes Linder; Erik Gustafsson
- Past members: Emil Petersson; Fredrik Solfors; Jesper Petersson; Erik Edwardsson

Surrounded are an alternative rock/space rock band from Växjö, Sweden, who have been described as "Sweden's answer to The Flaming Lips".

== Biography ==
The band was formed in 2000 by Marten Rydell (vocals, guitar) and Marcus Knutsson (guitar), with Emil Petersson (keyboards, sampling), Fredrik Solfors (drums), and Jesper Petersson (bass) soon added to the lineup. With influences ranging from Meddle-era Pink Floyd, The Flaming Lips, and Neil Young, the band were included on The Emo Diaries, Vol. 9, before their debut album, Safety in Numbers, was released in 2003 by Deep Elm Records.

A second album, The Nautilus Years, was issued in 2007, the band now signed to large indie label One Little Indian, and Rydell and Knutsson now joined by Tom Malmros (bass), Johannes Linder (drums) and Erik Gustafsson (keyboards). The album was partly recorded in a summerhouse in a forest in southern Sweden, and received positive critical reviews, with Drowned in Sound calling it "a work of such understated, almost casual beauty that it would be a crime for it to go unnoticed". Crawdaddy! said of the album "this stuff is so perfectly engineered to be pleasurable it’s hard to find any specific weak points". In 2010 the band performed at the renowned Austin festival South by Southwest (SXSW) with songs from the upcoming Oppenheimer and Woodstock, mixed and co-produced by Tony Doogan (Belle and Sebastian, Mogwai, Snow Patrol), Bill Racine (Sparklehorse, The Flaming Lips) and Paul Mahajan (The National, TV on the Radio).

The band's style has been described as "a rare hybrid of shoegazing and Americana". Comparisons have been made with several bands including The Flaming Lips, Doves, Super Furry Animals, Grandaddy and Sparklehorse.

== Discography ==
- Safety in Numbers (2003) Deep Elm
- The Nautilus Years (2007) One Little Indian
- Oppenheimer and Woodstock (2010) One Little Indian
