= Red Animal War =

US musical group

- Red Animal War circa 2001. From left to right Brian Pho, Matt Pittman, Jeff Wilganoski, Justin Wilson.

Background information
- Origin: Dallas, TX
- Genres: Alternative rock Indie rock Post-Hardcore
- Years active: 1998 – present (Hiatus)
- Labels: Deep Elm (2000-2004); Ice Planet Records (2004); End Sounds (2006 - )
- Members: Justin Wilson; Matt Pittman; Brian Pho; Jeff Wilganoski
- Website: http://www.myspace.com/redanimalwar

Red Animal War is a rock band from Dallas, Texas that started in 1998 as Jeff Wilganoski, Jamie Shipman, Matt Pittman, and Justin Wilson. During the recording of their first album, Brian Pho replaced Jamie Shipman. Jeff Davis replaced Brian Pho in 2004, and Tony Wann came on as second drums later that year. Todd Harwell replaced Jeff Wilganoski in 2006, and after a SXSW performance the band went on indefinite hiatus. Frontman Justin Wilson has revealed the band is working on vinyl reissues and has a "full album demoed and partly recorded".

They released four records and two seven-inches, and showed up on many compilations. They toured Europe three times and North America many times over. J. Robbins, Ed Rose and Darrell LaCour produced records for them and the band gets their name from this quote:

"The greater part of the untested men appeared quiet and absorbed. They were going to look at war, the red animal—war, the blood-swollen god."

- Stephen Crane, The Red Badge of Courage.

== Band members ==
- Justin Wilson - vocals, guitar
- Matt Pittman - guitar, vocals
- Brian Pho - bass
- Jeff Wilganoski - drums

== Discography ==
=== Albums ===
- Breaking In An Angel - (April 24, 2001 · Deep Elm Records)
- Black Phantom Crusades - (September 17, 2002 · Deep Elm Records)
- Polizida - (2004 · Ice Planet Records)
- Seven Year War - (2006 · End Sounds)

=== Splits ===
- Red Animal War/Slowride [EP] - (2002 · Deep Elm Records)

=== Compilations ===
- Emo Diaries No. 4: An Ocean of Doubt (1999 · Deep Elm Records)
- Deep Elm Unreleased No. 1 (2001 · Deep Elm Records)
- Deep Elm Sampler No. 3: Sound Spirit Fury Fire (2001 · Deep Elm Records)
- Too Young To Die: Preventing Youth Suicide (2003 · Deep Elm Records)
- Deep Elm Sampler No. 4: Hearts Bleed Blue (2004 · Deep Elm Records)
- Deep Elm Sampler No. 5: This Is How I Kill My Tears (2005 · Deep Elm Records)

== See also ==
- Brian Pho
  - vOLUMe
  - The Numbers Twist
  - Hanoi
  - Sun Alive
