= Athletics (band) =

American post-rock band

- Origin: Asbury Park, New Jersey
- Genres: Post-rock
- Years active: 2010–present
- Labels: Deep Elm Records
- Members: Jimmy Boyce; John Cannon; Howie Cohen; Zachary West; Garrett Yaeger
- Website: athleticsmusic.bandcamp.com

Athletics are an American post-rock band from Asbury Park, New Jersey.

== History ==
Athletics began in 2010, releasing their first album, Why Aren't I Home?, on Deep Elm Records. In 2012, Athletics self-released their second full-length album titled Who You Are Is Not Enough. The album was mixed by Moving Mountains Gregory Dunn. The band was featured in Alternative Press's 2015 list of "100 Bands You Need To Know". In 2016, Athletics released an EP titled When To Run, Where To Hide.

== Discography ==
Studio albums

- Why Aren't I Home (2010, Deep Elm Records)
- Who You Are Is Not Enough (2012, self-released, re-released in 2014 by Deep Elm Records)
- What Makes You Think This Is How It All Ends? (2025, Deep Elm Records)

EPs

- Stop Torturing Yourself (2012, Deep Elm)
- When To Run, Where To Hide (2016, Deep Elm)
