= El Producto (Walt Mink album) =

Studio album by Walt Mink
- Released: January 16, 1996
- Recorded: April–May 1995
- Genre: Alternative rock
- Length: 38:39
- Label: Atlantic
- Producer: John Agnello, Walt Mink

Walt Mink chronology
Bareback Ride (1993)	El Producto (1996)	Colossus (1997)

El Producto is the third album by the American alternative rock band Walt Mink, released in 1996. On release, it received a 10/10 rating from Pitchfork Media.

The band promoted the album by touring with Fig Dish.

== Critical reception ==
Professional ratings
Review scores
Source	Rating
AllMusic	4/5 stars
Pitchfork Media	10/10

Trouser Press wrote: "Still one of the most imaginative extreme-guitar activists in pop, Kimbrough has likewise expanded his vocal repertoire, adding Beatlesque stylings and a middle register to tether the higher reaches of his eccentric stop-start-hold-rush phrasing." Spin determined that the album's "melodic guitar swirls, sharp syncopation, and helium-sucking vocals keep you guessing what's next." The Indianapolis Star concluded: "Switching fluidly between gentle and roaring tempos—sometimes in the same song—this trio reaches levels of melody-writing, energy and performance that are consistently, remarkably high."

Prior to the review's deletion from Pitchfork's archives, El Producto was the first album to be given a perfect 10 score from the publication. Founder Ryan Schreiber described the album as "guitar, strings, and John Kimbrough's boyish voice blend[ing] together in what sounds like a serious case of good music."

== Track listing ==
All songs written by John Kimbrough.

1. "Stood Up" – 3:31
2. "Everything Worthwhile" – 2:42
3. "Betty" – 3:01
4. "Overgrown" – 3:23
5. "Settled" – 3:11
6. "Me & My Dog" – 3:11
7. "Little Sister" – 2:59
8. "Up & Out" – 2:59
9. "#246" – 3:20
10. "Listen Up" – 2:27
11. "Sunshine M." – 3:57
12. "Love in the Dakota" – 3:58

== Personnel ==
- John Kimbrough – guitar, vocals
- Candice Belanoff – bass guitar, backing vocals
- Orestes Morfin – drums, percussion, backing vocals
- John Agnello – producer, engineer, mix
- Keith Cleversley – mix
- Wayne Dorell – assistant engineer
- Juan Garcia – assistant engineer
- Sue Kapa – assistant engineer
- Greg Calbi – mastering
- Ken Schles – photography
