= Reverb (TV series) =

- Starring: Various artists
- Country of origin: United States

Production
- Executive producers: Jim Noonan; Will Tanous
- Producer: Will Tanous
- Running time: 50 minutes

Original release
- Network: HBO
- Release: April 13, 1997 – November 28, 2001

Reverb was a weekly HBO music television series spotlighting emerging talent that ran for four seasons (1997–2001). Reverb captured the energy and spontaneity of live music by taking viewers on stage, backstage, and into the audience at some of the premier venues in the United States. Joining artists on tour, without special staging or second takes, Reverb created an unfiltered, authentic and intimate experience where the viewer became part of the live show dynamic between artist and fan. During its run, the show became the highest-rated, regularly scheduled music program on television. A joint effort of HBO and Warner Music Group, Reverb featured a wide variety of artists from major and independent record labels. Vanity Fair magazine called the show "a brilliant showcase of underground favorites."

The series creators were Jim Noonan, Chris Spencer and Will Tanous. Noonan served as Executive Producer (Season 1–3) and Tanous served as a Producer (Seasons 1-3) and Executive Producer (Season 4). Directors for the series included Milton Lage and Linda Mendoza. Respected music producer and engineer, Mr. Colson of Smart Studios in Madison, Wisconsin served as the series' primary music mixer. Reverb was also critical in the launch of the career of comedian Fred Armisen, who was featured as a special correspondent. Comedian and musician Dave Hill served as a writer on the show. He also composed and performed the show's theme song.

== Artists featured ==
Artists performances featured on Reverb included the following:

- Adema
- Archers of Loaf
- Bad Religion
- Beastie Boys
- Beck
- Ben Folds Five
- Beth Hart
- Bettie Serveert
- Blondie
- Björk
- Brand New Immortals
- Built to Spill
- R. L. Burnside
- Catch 22
- Calexico
- Tracy Chapman
- Cheap Trick
- Cibo Matto
- Paula Cole
- Collective Soul
- Cornelius
- Cornershop
- Creeper Lagoon
- The Cult
- Dinosaur Jr.
- Disturbed
- Pete Droge
- Eels
- Eva Haze
- Everclear
- Everlast
- Failure
- Fastball
- The Flaming Lips
- Foo Fighters
- Fountains of Wayne
- G. Love & Special Sauce
- Goldfinger
- Grant Lee Buffalo
- Green Day
- Guided by Voices
- Ben Harper
- Robyn Hitchcock
- Hole
- Imperial Teen
- Kid Rock
- The Lemonheads
- Linkin Park
- Live
- The Living End
- Lotion
- Marvelous 3
- Melvins
- The Mighty Mighty Bosstones
- Moby
- Morphine
- Mos Def
- Mudvayne
- Oasis
- Oysterhead
- Onesidezero
- Owsley
- Papa Roach
- Pavement
- Pennywise
- Pete Yorn
- Pete
- Primus
- Rage Against the Machine
- Remy Zero
- Reverend Horton Heat
- Rocket from the Crypt
- The Roots
- Sebadoh
- Shootyz Groove
- Semisonic
- Showoff
- Smash Mouth
- Smoking Popes
- Sigur Rós
- Spring Heeled Jack
- Staind
- Sugar Ray
- Super Furry Animals
- Son Volt
- Soul Coughing
- Systematic
- Joe Strummer
- Talib Kweli
- Third Eye Blind
- The Urge
- Tugboat Annie
- Walt Mink
- Weezer
- Scott Weiland
- Wilco
