= Bareback Ride =

Studio album by Walt Mink
- Released: June 1, 1993
- Genre: Alternative rock, math rock, psychedelic rock
- Length: 30:43
- Label: Caroline (US release); Quigley (UK release)
- Producer: Walt Mink

Walt Mink chronology
Miss Happiness (1992)	Bareback Ride (1993)	El Producto (1996)

Bareback Ride is the second album by the American alternative rock band Walt Mink, released in 1993. Sales and acclaim for the album fell short of the band's first album, Miss Happiness, which was released the previous year.

Bareback Ride was the last album with the original band lineup of John Kimbrough, Candice Belanoff and Joey Waronker.

== Critical reception ==
Professional ratings
Review scores
Source	Rating
AllMusic	3/5 stars
Entertainment Weekly	B

Entertainment Weekly wrote: "Astonishingly derivative of ’60s Brit-pop (the Kinks at their most cloying) and ’70s prog-rock (don’t ask), Walt Mink can’t be serious, and that’s the trio’s appeal." The Washington Post wrote that "these 10 songs are pithy -- there's not a 10-minute drum solo to be found -- and [John] Kimbrough's wispy voice recalls the feyness of neo-psychedelic pop bands like the Three O'Clock." Billboard praised the band's "keen sense of melody and dynamic instrumental punch." Trouser Press thought that "Kimbrough weaves a simple, busy web of guitar, roaring just as loudly but concentrating his efforts into metallic vignettes rather than functionally stable textures."

== Track listing ==
All songs written by John Kimbrough.

1. "Subway" – 2:18
2. "Shine" – 4:06
3. "Zero Day" – 1:58
4. "Disappear" – 2:48
5. "Sunnymede" – 3:49
6. "Frail" – 3:41
7. "Turn" – 2:30
8. "Fragile" – 3:02
9. "What a Day" – 2:59
10. "Tree in Orange" – 3:31

== Personnel ==
- John Kimbrough – guitar, vocals
- Candice Belanoff – bass guitar, backing vocals
- Joey Waronker – drums, percussion
- That Dog – additional voices & strings
- Stuart Wylen – flute notes
- Brian Foxworthy – engineer
- Mike Augustinelli – assistant engineer
- Ezra Gold – engineer on "Sunnymede"
- John Agnello – mix
