= Goonies Never Say Die =

Band from Blackpool, England

- Origin: Blackpool, England
- Genres: Post-Rock; Instrumental; Cinematic
- Years active: 2007-present
- Labels: Deep Elm Records (US), The Recording Industry Is Dead, Records (UK)
- Past members: Barry Parkinson (guitar), Simon Morgan (guitar), Dan Kerr (drums), Steve Trenell (bass), Jimi MacPhie (piano)
- Website: http://www.gooniesneversaydie.co.uk

Goonies Never Say Die are a five-piece instrumental and post-rock band from Blackpool, England. They formed around June 2007 in Blackpool UK. They have released two albums on Deep Elm Records and as of October 2014 have started work on a third album. The band name is taken from a line in the 1985 film The Goonies.

== Career ==
For the first two albums the band's line up was Barry Parkinson (guitar), Simon Morgan (guitar/electronics), Dan Kerr (drums), Steve Trenell (bass) and Jimi MacPhie (piano).

For the third album the band's line up was Barry Parkinson (guitar), Dan Kerr (drums), Paul Kayley (guitar) and Michael Zubine (bass).

Previous live members have included Ric Thomas (bass), Luke Williams (drums), Stephen 'Pedro' Pellatt (drums) and Mark Tierney (guitar).

They were signed to Deep Elm Records, with whom they had two releases. The first album, In A Forest Without Trees, scored praise from the media, including Rock Sound AltSounds, Exclaim!, Punk News, and Metal Hammer who gave them 8/10 review. They also released a single called "Paul", which was the first song to be taken from the band's second album, No Words To Voice Our Hopes and Fears released by Deep Elm Records in October 2010.

Their first album was recorded by the band themselves between October 2008 and March 2009 at Kendal College, and at the band's own studio in Blackpool. The band released the album as a free download in May 2009. The demand was unexpected and the web servers hosting the album crashed after it received over 2000 downloads within four hours. They were offered a recording contract with Deep Elm in July 2009, and the album was officially re-released on 7 September 2009. Their follow-up, which was also recorded by the band themselves was issued in October 2010. Goonies Never Say Die were featured in Alternative Press Magazine as one of the 100 Bands You Need To Know in the 2010 Feature.

In January 2013 they completed a new EP, but decided against releasing this when they went on hiatus. Only two songs have been released from these sessions 'Not with a Whimper But A Bang' and 'Something of Summers Past', both songs are free downloads available via Barry Parkinson's label 'The Recording Industry Is Dead Records' The band's hiatus ended in March 2014 when they started performing together again. After performing at the ArcTanGent Festival during August 2014, the band went on a break again.

== Other projects ==
Barry Parkinson and Steve Trenell currently play in the band Oceans Over Alderaan. Simon Morgan and Steve Pellatt currently play in the band Blanket. Dan Kerr and Ric Thomas currently play in the band Three Headed Monkey. Barry Parkinson, Dan Kerr and Ric Thomas also perform on occasion in the band Dinosaurs Are Shit Dragons, who whilst currently on hiatus, perform gigs sporadically.

== Discography ==
=== Albums ===
Date of Release	Title
September 2009	In A Forest Without Trees
October 2010	No Words To Voice Our Hopes and Fears

=== Singles and EPs ===
Date of Release	Title
April 2010	Paul

Date of Release	Title
December 2013	Something of Summers Past
