= Miss Happiness =

Studio album by Walt Mink
- Released: 1992
- Studio: Smart, Madison, Wisconsin
- Genre: Alternative rock, psychedelic rock
- Length: 36:55
- Label: Caroline (US release); Quigley (UK release)
- Producer: Doug "Mr Colson" Olson

Walt Mink chronology
The Poll Riders Win Again!!! (1991)	Miss Happiness (1992)	Bareback Ride (1993)

Miss Happiness is the debut studio album by the American alternative rock band Walt Mink, released in 1992. It contains a cover of Nick Drake's "Pink Moon". The band supported the album with a North American tour.

== Critical reception ==
Professional ratings
Review scores
Source	Rating
AllMusic	4.5/5 stars

USA Today wrote: "An idiosyncratic Cream for the '90s, Walt Mink adds daring innovation to the power trio formula." The St. Petersburg Times called the album a "kooky concoction of psychedelia and heavy metal."

The Orlando Sentinel determined that Walt Mink "has the chops and creativity of King's X but with more concision and without all the artsy overambition and concept baggage." Stereo Review labeled Miss Happiness "a mixture of guitar-driven sass and twee-voiced smarm."

AllMusic deemed the album "one of the brightest debuts of the '90s."

== Track listing ==
All songs written by John Kimbrough except Pink Moon, written by Nick Drake.

1. "Miss Happiness" – 3:26
2. "Chowder Town" – 3:02
3. "Love You Better" – 3:55
4. "Showers Down" – 4:08
5. "Quiet Time" – 3:32
6. "Pink Moon" – 3:15
7. "Smoothing the Ride" – 3:09
8. "Croton-Harmon (local)" – 3:32
9. "Twinkle and Shine" – 3:03
10. "Factory" – 5:53

== Personnel ==
- John Kimbrough – guitar, vocals
- Candice Belanoff – bass guitar, backing vocals
- Joey Waronker – drums, percussion, backing vocals
- Doug "Mr Colson" Olson – production, engineering, mix
- Brian Anderson – engineering
- Daniel Corrigan – cover photograph
- Jen Schmid – painting
