= Pete (band) =

American rock band

- Origin: New Jersey, United States
- Genres: Post-grunge; alternative metal; nu metal
- Labels: Warner Bros
- Past members: David Terrana; Rich Andruska; Lars Alverson; Scott Anderson
- Website: petenoise.com

Pete (stylized as pete.) was an American post-grunge and alternative metal band from New Jersey, United States. The band was most known for its song "Sweet Daze", which peaked at #17 on Billboard's Mainstream Rock Songs chart in 2001.

== History ==
=== Early days (199X-2000) ===
The band toured throughout the United States, including Detroit, Toledo, and Iowa City during the mid-1990s. The band was named after "a man who always seemed to be the life of the party at a Newark, N.J., watering hole".

=== Signing to Warner Bros. and self-titled debut (2001-2004) ===
The band became signed to Warner Bros. Records under "rather unique circumstances"; after providing a demo tape to a rock radio station, the song "Burn" become remarkably popular, resulting in attention and later signing to the label. Pete's self-titled album, produced by Ross Hogarth and Jason Slater, was released on July 31, 2001.

Pete appeared on the August 29, 2001 episode of HBO's concert series Reverb with nu metal bands Adema and Staind.

It is implied that Pete broke up at some point before 2005.

=== Reformation as Sonicult (2005-2009) ===
In 2005, the original band members reformed as Sonicult, which released one album on Rat Pak Records in 2009. Andruska later left the band and was replaced by Freddy V.

== Discography ==
=== Studio albums ===
- pete. (2001-07-31)

=== Singles ===
- Sweet Daze (2001)
  - #14 Active rock, #17 Mainstream Rock Songs, #25 Heritage rock

== Members ==
- David Terrana – vocals (199X–200X, 2005-20XX)
- Rich Andruska – guitar (199X–200X, 2005-20XX)
- Freddy V – guitar (20XX-20XX)
- Lars Alverson – bass (199X–200X, 2005-20XX)
- Scott Anderson – drums (199X–200X, 2005-20XX)
