= Moonlit Sailor =

Swedish post-rock band

- Origin: Borås, Sweden
- Years active: 2006–present
- Labels: Deep Elm Records, XTAL
- Members: Adam Törnblad; Oscar Gullbrandsen; Joakim Wiik; Markus Rundlöf

Moonlit Sailor is a post-rock band from Borås, Sweden, formed in 2006. The group consisted of Joakim Wiik (keyboards/guitar), Oscar Gullbrandsen (guitar), Adam Törnblad (drums/guitar/piano), and Markus Rundlöf (bass).

In 2008, the band released their debut EP A Footprint of Feelings through the independent record label Deep Elm Records. The following year they released a full-length album, So Close to Life, and in 2010 they embarked on a small European tour that included stops in Germany, Austria, the United Kingdom, and Finland. The band released a second album in 2011, Colors in Stereo, also through Deep Elm Records.

On May 8, 2017, Törnblad died at the age of 27.

== Discography ==
=== Albums ===
- 2008: A Footprint of Feelings (Deep Elm Records)
- 2009: So Close to Life (Deep Elm Records)
- 2011: Colors In Stereo (Deep Elm Records)
- 2014: We Come From Exploding Stars (Deep Elm Records)
