= Will Tanous =

American music industry executive

- Born: Paris, France
- Occupation: Record executive
- Years active: 1993–present
- Title: Executive Vice President, Chief Administrative Officer of Universal Music Group

William Lloyd Tanous is a French-born record executive. He has served as Executive Vice President, Chief Administrative Officer for Universal Music Group since 2021.

Tanous led the initial public listings of two of the three major music corporations. His former deputies serve as communication heads for Warner Music Group and Sony Music Entertainment.

== Career ==
=== 1993–2013 ===
Tanous was previously a member of the senior management team for Warner Music Group, where he was EVP of Communications & Marketing. While at WMG, Tanous developed and implemented communications strategies for major company endeavors, including the 2011 sale of WMG for $3.3 billion to Access Industries, Inc.; WMG's initial public offering on the New York Stock Exchange in 2005; and the sale of WMG for $2.6 billion by Time Warner Inc. to private equity consortium. In 1996, he co-created and produced the HBO live music television series Reverb, which aired for four seasons and was the highest-rated regularly scheduled music program on television. Prior to joining Warner Music Group, Tanous held positions at Warner Music International and Geffen Records. He also served as president of two independent record labels.

=== 2013–present ===
Tanous became the EVP of Communications at Universal Music Group in April 2013, reporting to Universal Music Group Chairman and CEO Lucian Grainge.

Tanous is responsible for developing and communicating the company's business strategy, managing worldwide communications, public policy, government relations, as well as interaction of UMG's companies in over 60 countries. Tanous was promoted to Executive Vice President, Chief Administration Officer (CAO) in 2021, recognizing his contributions to the success of the company's global strategy and operations. As CAO, Tanous oversees major strategic and corporate endeavors.

In 2021, Tanous led the communications, corporate strategy, marketing and investor relations efforts behind UMG's public listing on the Euronext Amsterdam marking the largest IPO in the history of the music business, valuing UMG at more than $53 billion.

Tanuous is based in Santa Monica, California.

== Honors and achievements ==
Tanous has been recognized multiple times on the Billboard Power 100, an annual list published by Billboard Magazine recognizing the most powerful executives in the music industry. In 2023, he was featured among the executive team occupying the No. 1 position with Sir Lucian Grainge.

In 2019, Tanous was awarded the Ellis Island Medal of Honor, which is presented annually to US citizens "who have distinguished themselves within their own ethnic groups while exemplifying the values of the American way of life."

In 2017, Tanous was featured in the book 100 Influential Lebanese Figures Around the Globe recognizing his leadership in the entertainment industry.

== Personal life ==
Tanous was born in Paris, France and raised in New York City. He graduated from Georgetown University in Washington, D.C. and holds a Bachelor of Arts degree. He is of Lebanese, Scottish and Irish descent. He is married to Julie Tanous, an author and recipe developer who co-authored the critically acclaimed cookbook Cooking With Friends with actor Jesse Tyler Ferguson.
