= I Am Sonic Rain =

Instrumental post-rock band from Treviso, Italy

- Origin: Treviso, Italy
- Genres: Post-rock; Instrumental; Cinematic
- Years active: 2001–present
- Labels: Deep Elm Records (US)
- Members: Giulio Signorotto; Federico Cipolla; Francesco Vettor; Marco Longo; Alessandro Carlozzo
- Past members: Alessandro Stival; Alessio Centenaro; Riccardo Trevisi; Alessandro Carlozzo; Andrea Sara
- Website: https://www.facebook.com/iamsonicrainband/

I Am Sonic Rain are an instrumental and post-rock band from Treviso, Italy. They formed in 2001 in Treviso, Italy. They have released two albums on Deep Elm Records. They are made up of Giulio Signorotto (guitar), Francesco Vettor (guitar), Marco Longo (guitar), Federico Cipolla (bass), and for the first and the third album Alessandro Carlozzo (drums). Previous members have included Andrea Sara (synths and piano), Alessandro Stival (drums), Riccardo Trevisi (drums) and Alessio Centenaro (drums).

In July 2005, the band released their debut album It's Falling on Us and after release in September 2010 through the independent record label Deep Elm Records. The band released a second album in 2010, Between Whales and Feverish Lights, also through Deep Elm Records. The album has received generally positive reviews. In 2017, the band began recording a third album.

== Members ==
=== Current ===
- Giulio Signorotto – guitar
- Vettor Francesco – guitar
- Marco Longo – guitar
- Federico Cipolla – bass
- Alessandro Carlozzo – drums

=== Former ===
- Andrea Sara – organ, piano, synths (2009-2011)
- Riccardo Trevisi – drums (pre-2000)
- Alessandro Carlozzo – drums (2000-2006)
- Alessandro Stival – drums (2008-2011)
- Alessio Centenaro – drums (2014-2016)

== Discography ==
=== Studio albums ===
- 2005 – It's Falling on Us (Deep Elm Records)
- 2010 – Between Whales and Feverish Lights (Deep Elm Records)
- 2017 – Hidden (Deep Elm Records)

=== Singles and EPs ===
- 2005 – Sleepless

=== Compilations ===
- 2012 – Postrockology with "Fog Is Drowning Us" (Deep Elm Records)
