= Camber (band) =

- Origin: New York City, New York, US
- Genres: Indie rock, emo, post-hardcore
- Years active: 1996–2003
- Labels: Deep Elm
- Past members: Barry Lott (vocals, guitar); Corby Caldwell (guitar); Joey DellaCroce (bass); Chris Chin (drums); Roger Coletti (drums)

Camber was an American emo/post-hardcore band from New York City, recognized for being one of the pioneers of the second-wave Eastern indie emo sound. They were often compared to likes of Texas Is the Reason, Sunny Day Real Estate and Mineral. Roger Coletti replaced original drummer Chris Chin in 2001, before their final release.

== Discography ==
Albums

- Beautiful Charade (Deep Elm, 1997)
- Anyway, I've Been There (Deep Elm, 1999)
- Wake Up and Be Happy (Deep Elm, 2002)

Single and splits

- "Hollowed-Out" b/w Question Marks (Deep Elm, 1996)
- Split with Kid Brother Collective (1999)
- Brandtson–Camber–Seven Storey (Deep Elm, 2003)
