= Deep Elm Records =

US independent record label

- Founded: 1995
- Founder: John Szuch
- Distributor: The Orchard
- Genre: Indie rock, emo, post-rock, post-hardcore
- Country of origin: United States
- Location: Maui, Hawaii
- Official website: www.deepelm.com

Deep Elm Records is an independent record label releasing albums by bands such as Lights & Motion, The Appleseed Cast, Brandtson, The White Octave, and Planes Mistaken for Stars. It also released the compilation series The Emo Diaries.

== History ==
Deep Elm Records started in New York City by John Szuch. Deep Elm's first release was the single "Anthemic Tune" by Curdlefur in 1995. Its first album was by Camber in March 1997.

In 2006 Deep Elm Records signed its first UK act, Free Diamonds. By 2008, Deep Elm stopped pressing physical CDs and vinyl, effectively becoming a digital only label. The label has refused to be bought out by a larger company, and is currently located in Maui, Hawaii.

Vice described Deep Elm as "a seminal label for the 90s/early 200s emo scene".

=== Compilation albums ===
Between 1997 and 2011, the label released a series of twelve compilation albums titled The Emo Diaries. The series had an open submissions policy and featured mostly acts that were unsigned at the time of the albums' releases. The Emo Diaries featured then-new and unreleased music by such acts as The Appleseed Cast, Brandtson, Further Seems Forever, Jimmy Eat World, Planes Mistaken for Stars and Samiam. In 2025, Deep Elm released The Emo Diaries, Chapter 13: Confessions Of A Broken Man, reviving the compilation series after 14 years. It also released a compilation series called This Is Indie Rock.

Deep Elm's founder, John Szuch, claims that the original name for the series was intended to be The Indie Rock Diaries, but this was ruled out when the first volume included Jimmy Eat World and Samiam, who were both signed to major record labels. The Emo Diaries was chosen because The Emotional Diaries was too long for the album cover. Despite the title, the bands featured in the series have a diversity of sounds that do not all necessarily fit into the emo style of rock music. Andy Greenwald, in his book Nothing Feels Good: Punk Rock, Teenagers, and Emo, claims that the series "stake[s] a claim for emo as more a shared aesthetic than a genre." The label is now famous as a home for alternative post-rock bands, with acts such as Lights & Motion, Moonlit Sailor, Athletics and Dorena.

== Artists past and present ==
- 500 Miles to Memphis
- Accents
- Again for the Win
- The Appleseed Cast
- Athletics
- Benton Falls
- Brandtson
- Burns Out Bright
- Camber
- Cari Clara
- Carly Comando
- The Cast Before the Break
- Clair De Lune
- Dartz!
- The Dandelion War
- David Singer & the Sweet Science
- Dead Red Sea
- Desert City Soundtrack
- Desoto Jones
- Dorena
- Drive Til Morning
- Eleven Minutes Away
- Everything in Waves
- Fightstar
- Fire Divine
- Five-eight
- Flanders
- Floating in Space
- Free Diamonds
- Ghost of Otis
- Goonies Never Say Die
- Hundred Hands
- I Am Sonic Rain
- Imbroco
- Inward Oceans
- Keystone Kids
- Kid You Not
- Last Days of April
- Last Lungs
- Latterman
- Les Sages
- Lewis
- Lights & Motion
- Lock and Key
- Logh
- Moving Mountains
- Moonlit Sailor
- Muckafurgason
- Our Lost Infantry
- Papermoons
- Pave the Rocket
- Planes Mistaken for Stars
- Pop Unknown
- Public Radio
- Red Animal War
- Ride Your Bike
- Settlefish
- Seven Storey Mountain
- She Bears
- Slowride
- Small Arms Dealer
- So Sad Althea
- Sounds Like Violence
- Starmarket
- Summer Hours
- Surrounded
- This Beautiful Mess
- Track a Tiger
- Triple Fast Action
- U137
- Walt Mink
- The White Octave
